= Nemesis (patrol vessel) =

UK-flagged patrol vessel originally built for the New South Wales Water Police

History

United Kingdom
- Name: Nemesis
- Owner: Green Britain Foundation
- Operator: Fish Net Zero
- Builder: Austal Ships, Henderson, Western Australia
- Yard number: 154–160 (series)
- Launched: August 2000
- Acquired: 2024 (by Green Britain Foundation)
- In service: 2000
- Out of service: c. 2019 (NSW Police)
- Identification: MMSI 235108597; Call sign 2ICQ8
- Notes: Formerly Vanguard (WP 22), built for the New South Wales Police Marine Area Command

General characteristics
- Type: Patrol boat
- Displacement: 22.7 t (22.3 long tons)
- Length: 17.0 m (55 ft 9 in)
- Beam: 4.9 m (16 ft 1 in)
- Draught: 1.2 m (3 ft 11 in)
- Propulsion: 2 × Scania DI 12 42 diesel engines (2 × 485 kW) with Twin Disc MG 5114 1A gearboxes; 2 × fixed-pitch propellers
- Speed: 28.5 knots (52.8 km/h; 32.8 mph)
- Range: 400 nmi (740 km; 460 mi)
- Complement: 4 crew + up to 8 additional personnel
- Notes: Reported home port: Grimsby, United Kingdom.

Nemesis is a United Kingdom-flagged high-speed patrol vessel owned and operated by the Green Britain Foundation, a marine-conservation and environmental-education charity founded by Dale Vince. Originally built by Austal Ships in Western Australia for the New South Wales Police Force as the patrol boat Vanguard (WP 22), the vessel has served multiple roles ranging from coastal law enforcement and maritime security to environmental protection. It now operates as part of the Foundation’s Fish Net Zero initiative, undertaking marine-conservation patrols and the recovery of abandoned, lost or discarded fishing gear (ALDFG), commonly known as ghost gear, from UK waters.

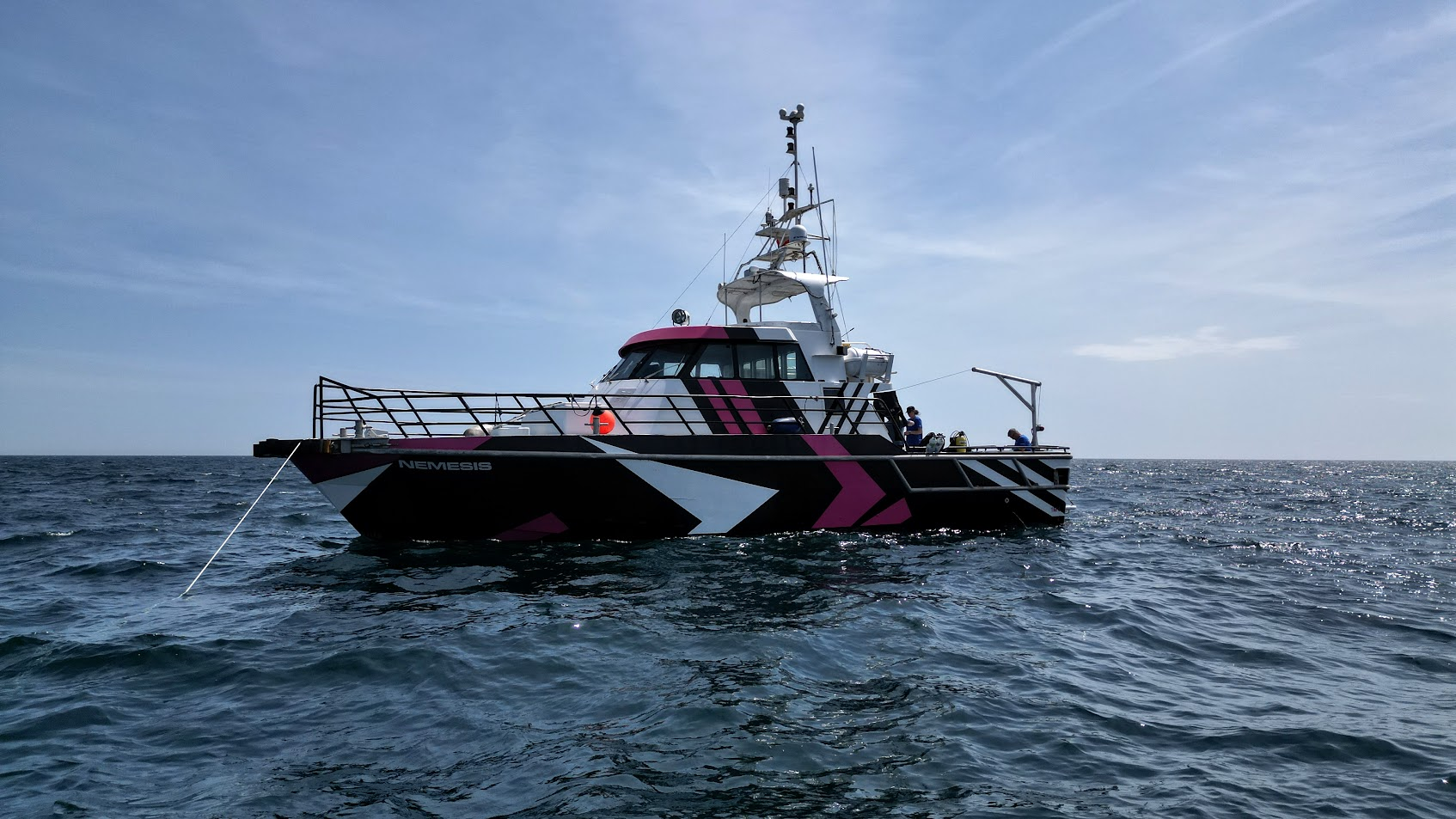
Patrol vessel Nemesis. Operated by the Green Britain Foundation as part of the Fish Net Zero campaign

== Construction and design ==
The vessel was constructed by Austal Ships at Henderson, Western Australia, as part of a batch of seven aluminium patrol craft (yard numbers 154–160) ordered by the New South Wales Water Police, now known as Marine Area Command for operations associated with the 2000 Sydney Olympics.

According to the builder’s specification, vessels of the class measured 17.0 metres (55 ft 9 in) long overall (LOA) with a beam of 4.9 m (16 ft 1 in) and a draught of 1.2 m (3 ft 11 in). Propulsion comprised two Scania DI 12 42 diesel engines rated at 485 kW (650 hp) each, driving fixed-pitch propellers through Twin Disc MG 5114 1A gearboxes, giving a top speed of 28.5 knots (52.8 km/h; 32.8 mph) and a range of about 400 nautical miles (740 km; 460 mi) under USL Code 2B survey.

== Service with New South Wales Police (2000-c. 2019) ==
Delivered in August 2000 as WP 22 Vanguard the vessel entered service with the Marine Area Command based in Sydney. Alongside sister ships such as Vigilant and Victor, she performed offshore patrol, maritime law enforcement and search-and-rescue duties throughout the New South Wales (NSW) coastline. The NSW Government announced a replacement programme in 2019 introducing new Class 2 vessels, after which the earlier Austal patrols were withdrawn from police service. A related report confirmed that seven Class 2 vessels were delivered to the NSW Police Marine Area Command in December 2019.

== Supersail Offshore service ==
Following decommissioning, the vessel was transferred to commercial use under the name MV Vanguard operating with Supersail Offshore as a Class A guard and workboat. A 2020 data-sheet lists the craft as 16.5 m (54 ft 2 in) LOA, with a beam of 4.9 m (16 ft 1 in), a draught 1.2 m (3 ft 11 in), fitted with twin Scania DI 12 42 engines and certified speed 26 knots (48 km/h; 30 mph), confirming registration under UK flag with call sign 2ICQ8.

== Transfer to the United Kingdom and conversion ==
In May 2024 the vessel was unveiled publicly as Nemesis by the Green Britain Foundation and Neptune’s Pirates UK (Captain Paul Watson Foundation UK). A regional news report by the *Shields Gazette* described Nemesis as “an all-weather patrol vessel owned by the Green Britain Foundation, the charity founded by eco-entrepreneur and green industrialist Dale Vince OBE.” The vessel was named Nemesis after the electric sports car developed by Dale Vince in 2008 under his company Ecotricity, reflecting the Foundation’s ongoing commitment to renewable energy and sustainability.

Repainted in a distinctive pink-accented dazzle camouflage, the vessel was later withdrawn from the Captain Paul Watson Foundation UK and transferred back to the Green Britain Foundation, where it is now used for marine-conservation patrols and the recovery of abandoned, lost or discarded fishing gear (ALDFG), commonly referred to as ghost gear, in UK waters as part of the Foundation’s Fish Net Zero initiative.

Abandoned or lost fishing equipment such as nets, pots and lines can continue to entangle marine life for years, damage seabed habitats, and pose navigational hazards. The Fish Net Zero campaign utilises Nemesis and volunteer divers to locate and remove this debris from areas including the Humber estuary and the North Sea. The vessel has been reported as operating from the Fish Dock, Grimsby, United Kingdom.

== Registration ==
AIS records identify Nemesis as a High-Speed Craft registered under the British flag with MMSI 235108597 and call sign 2ICQ8.
