= SeaRaser =

Wave power concept

The SeaRaser (also called Sea~Ryser) was a wave power concept developed by Alvin Smith from Devon between 1997 and 2019.

The device concept uses the power of the waves to pump water uphill into shore mounted tanks, where it can then be released through a conventional hydroelectric turbine. It consists of two buoys, one on the sea surface the other below fixed to a weight on the sea bed, with a double-acting vertical piston suspended between them. It works in the same manner as a bicycle pump. The device has a self-adjusting mechanism to cope with the rise and fall of the tide.

A claimed benefit of the technology was that as water is pumped uphill and stored in tanks, it can then be used when required, and not be at the mercy of the waves. It also does not have any electrical components offshore, and is lubricated purely by seawater, maintenance of the buoy was claimed to be similar to navigation buoys, lifting out of the water for cleaning once a year.

Smith also envisaged the device could be used to pump water onshore for desalination and irrigation in dry countries.

== History ==
Smith came up with the idea in 1997 when playing with an inflatable ball in a swimming pool, realising the potential as it bobbed to the surface.

The device was patented in 2006, in the UK and around the world.

Dartmouth Wave Energy Ltd was set up in 2008 to develop the technology, however it was dissolved in December 2019.

A prototype was tested in 2008, which pumped water 160 feet (50 m) uphill through a pipe "the diameter of a saucer", however the full-sized device was envisaged to pump water 650 feet (200 m) uphill through a pipe the diameter of a dustbin. The full-size device would be rated at about 0.25 MW.

A further prototype was tested in 2009 off the coast of South Devon, and at that time Smith was in talks to build the system in the Middle East, having received "serious interest" from Gulf countries. These tests were conducted in March/April, with the device moored 400 metres (1,300 ft) offshore, and pumped the water up 15 to 20 metres (50 to 70 ft), depending on the height of the tide.

In 2011, the Searaser concept was included in an exhibition at the British Library, exploring 15 of the "most ingenious" British inventions of the previous decade.

In 2012, it was reported Ecotricity wanted to develop the concept, with founder Dale Vince saying the potential was enormous. It was hoped to test a device offshore at the FabTest site in Falmouth Bay by the end of 2012, however this did not happen. Vince commented in February 2013 that the "Seasraser [sic], [was] undergoing extensive modelling, in preparation for a sea trial".

In October 2014, a 1:14 scale model was tested at the University of Plymouth COAST Lab, supported by Ecotricity. A full-scale prototype was then expected to be tested with the following 12 months, with commercial arrays following "within a few years".

By 2015, a review of wave energy technologies suggested the concept had reached a technology readiness level of TRL4/5, but there does not appear to be any reported progress since.

Smith posted a video in September 2023 demonstrating the concept with a small buoy and a 74 millimetres (2.9 in) diameter pump operating just offshore in small waves at Hayling Island. At age 76, Smith decided to sell the intellectual property, UK patent, and equipment from the model tests.
