= Ministry of Agriculture, Fisheries and Food (United Kingdom) =

British government department, 1889–2002

Logo of the ministry

The Ministry of Agriculture, Fisheries and Food (MAFF) was a United Kingdom government department created by the Board of Agriculture Act 1889 (52 & 53 Vict. c. 30) and at that time called the Board of Agriculture, and then from 1903 the Board of Agriculture and Fisheries, and from 1919 the Ministry of Agriculture and Fisheries. It attained its final name in 1955 with the addition of responsibilities for the British food industry to the existing responsibilities for agriculture and the fishing industry, a name that lasted until the Ministry was dissolved in 2002, at which point its responsibilities had been merged into the Department for Environment, Food and Rural Affairs (Defra).

Until the Food Standards Agency was created, the Ministry was responsible for both food production and food safety which was seen by some to give rise to a conflict of interest. The Ministry was scrutinised by the Agriculture Select Committee.

== Background ==
The Board of Agriculture, which later become the Ministry of Agriculture, Fisheries and Food (MAFF), was established under the Board of Agriculture Act 1889. It was preceded, however, by an earlier Board of Agriculture, founded by royal charter on 23 August 1793 as the Board or Society for the Encouragement of Agriculture and Internal Improvement, which lasted until it was dissolved in June 1822. Though its founders hoped the board would become a department of state it was never more than a private society which spread useful knowledge and encouraged improvements in farming.

A significant predecessor of the second Board of Agriculture (later MAFF) was the Tithe Commission, which was set up in 1841 under the Tithe Commutation Act 1836 and amalgamated with the Enclosure Commissioners and the Copyhold Commissioners to become the Lord Commissioners for England and Wales under the Settled Land Act 1882, responsible to the Home Secretary, which became the Land Department of the new Board of Agriculture in 1889.

Another predecessor was the Cattle Plague Department, set up by the Home Office to deal with an outbreak of rinderpest in London in June 1865. This was renamed the Veterinary Department of the Privy Council in 1869 and became part of the new Board of Agriculture in 1889.

== Board of Agriculture ==
Board of Agriculture Act 1889 (Note: Section 14.)
- Act of Parliament
- Parliament of the United Kingdom
- Long title: An Act for establishing a Board of Agriculture for Great Britain.
- Citation: 52 & 53 Vict. c. 30
- Territorial extent: United Kingdom

Dates
- Royal assent: 12 August 1889
- Commencement: 12 August 1889 (Note: The Acts of Parliament (Commencement) Act 1793.)

Other legislation
- Amends: Tithe Act 1836
- Amended by: Board of Agriculture and Fisheries Act 1903; Statute Law Revision Act 1908; Ministry of Agriculture and Fisheries Act 1919; Statute Law Revision Act 1963; Statute Law Revision Act 1964; Plant Health Act 1967; Forestry Act 1967; Statute Law (Repeals) Act 1975; Statute Law (Repeals) Act 1978; Diseases of Animals Act 1894; Statute Law (Repeals) Act 1986; Statute Law (Repeals) Act 1989; Statute Law (Repeals) Act 1993; Ministry of Agriculture, Fisheries and Food (Dissolution) Order 2002

Status: Amended

Text of statute as originally enacted

Revised text of statute as amended

Text of the Board of Agriculture Act 1889 as in force today (including any amendments) within the United Kingdom, from legislation.gov.uk.

The Board of Agriculture Act 1889 (52 & 53 Vict. c. 30), passed on 12 August, established the Board of Agriculture and combined all government responsibilities for agricultural matters in one department. The first President of the new board was the Rt. Hon. Henry Chaplin, the initial staffing was set at ninety people, and the first annual estimate was for £55,000 (£5,000 of which was intended as a grant for agricultural and dairy schools). From 1892 to 1913, its secretary, the most senior civil servant, was Sir Thomas Elliott.

Board of Agriculture and Fisheries Act 1903 (Note: Section 3(2))
- Act of Parliament
- Parliament of the United Kingdom
- Long title: An Act to transfer to the Board of Agriculture powers and duties relating to the Industry of Fishing and to amend the Board of Agriculture Act 1889.
- Citation: 3 Edw. 7. c. 31
- Territorial extent: United Kingdom

Dates
- Royal assent: 14 August 1903
- Commencement: 1 October 1903

Other legislation
- Amends: Board of Agriculture Act 1889
- Amended by: Board of Agriculture and Fisheries Act 1909; Statute Law Revision Act 1927; Crown Estate Act 1961; Forestry Act 1967; Sea Fisheries (Shellfish) Act 1967; Trade Descriptions Act 1968; Statute Law (Repeals) Act 1978; Statute Law (Repeals) Act 1986

Status: Amended

Text of statute as originally enacted

Revised text of statute as amended

Text of the Board of Agriculture and Fisheries Act 1903 as in force today (including any amendments) within the United Kingdom, from legislation.gov.uk.

The board took responsibility for the Ordnance Survey in 1890, and it took responsibility for the Royal Botanic Gardens, Kew in 1903. Also in 1903, the Board of Agriculture and Fisheries Act 1903 (3 Edw. 7. c. 31) was passed to transfer certain powers and duties relating to the fishing industry from the Board of Trade to what then became the Board of Agriculture and Fisheries.

In 1904, the board appointed honorary agricultural correspondents throughout the country to liaise with the Board on Regional Matters and to give advice to farmers. In 1911, responsibility for all agricultural matters in Scotland except animal health was transferred to a newly created Board of Agriculture for Scotland.

Meanwhile, the country was increasingly becoming dependent on imported food. By 1914, the output of home-grown food only met one-third of the country's needs.

== First World War ==
The First World War was declared on 4 August 1914. Good harvests and little interruption to imports of food during the first two years of meant that there were no shortages of food, though the ministry was buying wheat, meat and sugar. The agricultural situation then changed for the worse with a poor crop harvest, failure of the potato crop, declining harvest abroad and increased shipping losses. In 1916, Rowland Prothero was appointed President of the Board of Agriculture with a seat in the Cabinet and with the aim of stimulating food production.

In December 1916, a Ministry of Food was created under the New Ministries and Secretaries Act 1916 (6 & 7 Geo. 5. c. 68) and Lord Devonport appointed Food Controller to regulate the supply and consumption of food and to encourage food production. A Food Production Department was established by the Board of Agriculture in January 1917 to organise and distribute agricultural inputs, such as labour, feed, fertiliser and machinery, and increase output of crops. Provision of labour provided considerable difficulty as many men working on farms had enlisted but co-operation between the War Office and the board enabled men to be released to help with spring cultivation and harvest. Also in 1917, the Women's Land Army was created to provide substitutes for men called up to the forces.

The Corn Production Act 1917 (7 & 8 Geo. 5. c. 46) guaranteed minimum prices for wheat and oats, specified a minimum wage for agricultural workers and established the Agricultural Wages Board, to ensure stability for farmers and a share of this stability for agricultural workers. The aim was to increase output of home-grown food and reduce dependence on imports.

In June 1917, Lord Devonport resigned as Food Controller to be replaced by Lord Rhondda, who introduced compulsory rationing of meat, sugar and butter in early 1918. By 1918, there were controls over 94% of foodstuffs; the Food Controller bought all essential food supplies and the Corn Production Act 1917 guaranteed cereal prices. The ministry had a staff of more than 8,000 with food control committees and divisional commissioners across the country. The ministry's Wheat Commission took over flour mills and dictated the shape and weight of bread, prohibiting sales of muffins, crumpets and teacakes. Oats, barley and beans were added to bread. These measures were said to have saved about 10 million sacks of wheat, but they were not universally welcomed. Meat was imported from the US and Argentina and refrigerated merchant ships were equipped with guns from April 1915. Meat prices were controlled from September 1917, and meat became scarce. Milk production fell during the war by about 25% and condensed milk imports rose from 49,000 tonnes to 128,000 tonnes. Lord Rhondda died on 1 July 1918 and was succeeded by John Clynes, MP. The armistice treaty ending World War I was signed on 11 November 1918. Following the war, the Food Controller resigned in 1919 and the Ministry of Food progressively wound down and closed on 31 March 1921.

== Ministry of Agriculture and Fisheries ==
Ministry of Agriculture and Fisheries Act 1919 (Note: Section 11(1).)
- Act of Parliament
- Parliament of the United Kingdom
- Long title: An Act to provide for the constitution of a Ministry of Agriculture and Fisheries and of Councils and Committees in connection with agriculture, and to amend the Board of Agriculture and Fisheries Acts, 1889 to 1909.
- Citation: 9 & 10 Geo. 5. c. 91
- Territorial extent: England and Wales (Note: Section 11(2).)

Dates
- Royal assent: 23 December 1919
- Commencement: 23 December 1919

Other legislation
- Amends: Board of Agriculture Act 1889
- Amended by: Diseases of Animals Act 1935

Status: Amended

Text of statute as originally enacted

Revised text of statute as amended

Text of the Ministry of Agriculture and Fisheries Act 1919 as in force today (including any amendments) within the United Kingdom, from legislation.gov.uk.

The Ministry of Agriculture and Fisheries Act 1919 (9 & 10 Geo. 5. c. 91) abolished the Board of Agriculture and Fisheries and created the Ministry of Agriculture and Fisheries, which took on the powers of the Board and the remaining functions of the Food Production Department established during the war. In 1919 prices of farm produce had risen by 25% compared to prices at the end of the war. The Agriculture Act 1920 (10 & 11 Geo. 5. c. 76) set out guaranteed prices for wheat and oats based on the 1919 averages, to be reviewed annually. However, in the early 1920s, prices fell drastically, the act was repealed, guaranteed prices were replaced by lump sum payments and the Agricultural Wages Board abolished, as part of the government's deflationary policies. By 1922 virtually all of war-time controls had gone. The area under cultivation in Britain fell from 12 million acres (49,000 km²) in 1918 to 9 million acres (36,000 km²) in 1926. Farm prices continued to decline and then fell by 34% in the three years after 1929.

During this period, the Ministry of Agriculture and Fisheries remained a small department concerned with pest and disease control, agricultural research and education, improvement of livestock, and provision of allotments and smallholdings. Over the next few years, its workload grew.

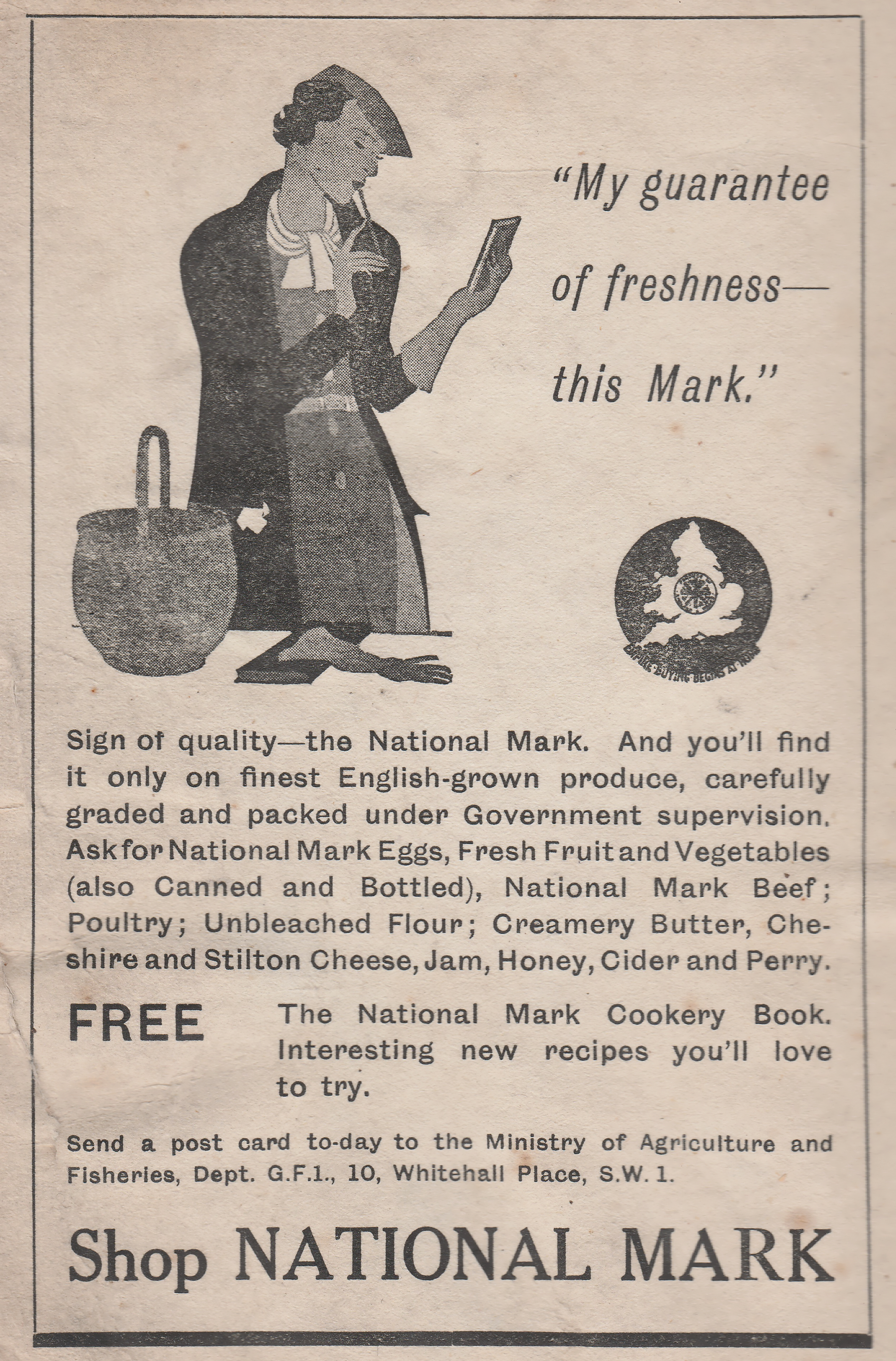
Ministry of Agriculture and Fisheries advert promoting National Mark produce

In the late 1920s and early 1930s the government introduced new measures to support domestic agriculture and farmers' income. Subsidies or price insurance schemes were created for sugar beet, wheat, cattle, dairy and sheep. The Agricultural Produce (Grading and Marking) Act 1928 (18 & 19 Geo. 5. c. 19) promoted the standardisation of grades and packaging and introduced the "National Mark", a trade mark denoting home-produced food of a defined quality for eggs, beef, apples and pears. The Agricultural Marketing Act 1931 (21 & 22 Geo. 5. c. 42) and the Agricultural Marketing Act 1933 (23 & 24 Geo. 5. c. 31) sought to organise farmers into co-operative marketing associations and created marketing boards for bacon, pigs, hops, milk and potatoes. The Import Duties Act 1932 (22 & 23 Geo. 5. c. 8) introduced a tariff on most imports including fruit and vegetables and quotas on imports of bacon, ham and other meat products. In 1936 the tithe rent charge was abolished, compensation paid to the Church and the money recovered from farmers over a 60-year period. In 1937 a scheme was introduce to subsidise the spreading of lime on agricultural land to boost the fertility of the soil. The Food (Defence Plans) Department was established in 1937 and was then constituted as the Ministry of Food on the outbreak of war in 1939. The Minister of Agriculture was given powers to regulate the cultivation and management of land, end tenancies, even take possession of land, under the Emergency Powers (Defence) Act 1939 (2 & 3 Geo. 6. c. 62). On 1 September 1939 many of these powers were delegated to county war agricultural executive committees ("war ags").

== Second World War ==
The Second World War was declared on 3 September 1939. The UK entered the war well prepared for the maintenance of supplies of food but with less than 40% of the country's needs produced at home. The Ministry of Food was formed on 8 September and William Morrison was appointed Minister. The Scientific Food Committee was established in May 1940 and outlined a basal diet of 2000 calories. The Ministry of Food became the sole buyer and importer of food and regulated prices, guaranteeing farmers prices and markets for their produce. The Marketing Boards, except for milk and hops, were suspended.

Recruiting began for the Women's Land Army and, in 1940, food rationing was introduced. Lord Woolton succeeded William Morrison as Minister for Food. In 1941, the US Lend-Lease Act was passed under which food, agricultural machinery and equipment was sent from the US to the UK.

It was at this time that the Ministry gained the ability to veto property developments on such land as was deemed to be particularly fertile ("best and most versatile"). The veto power lasted until the 2000s, at which point decisions concerning "best and most versatile land" came under the remit of the general planning system.

== Post-war era ==
The Ministry of Agriculture and Fisheries and the Ministry of Food were slated to be merged in October 1954, and became the Ministry of Agriculture, Fisheries and Food in April 1955.

The MAFF was responsible for the development and introduction of the Agricultural Land Classification system during the 1960s.

In March 1973, the IRA detonated some explosives in front of the Ministry of Agriculture building in Whitehall, killing one man and injuring 215 other people. Two other bombs that had been set to go off at the same time were defused by military and police experts. Ten suspects were taken into Metropolitan Police custody.

As soon as elevated radiation levels were detected in Europe after the 1986 Chernobyl disaster, the MAFF took milk samples from various areas of England in order to check for contamination. When the radioactive plume reached Britain, the MAFF set up a programme of monitoring all agricultural products; after this indicated that lamb products in certain parts of Britain were becoming unacceptably radioactive, an emergency order under the Food and Environment Protection Act 1985 restricted the movement and slaughter of sheep in Cumbria and certain areas of Wales and Scotland. Sheep in the affected areas had to pass a live-monitoring test before they could be sent to slaughter and farmers whose flocks were affected received compensation. Tests of agricultural products continued to be carried out as late as 1989.

=== Buffer depots ===
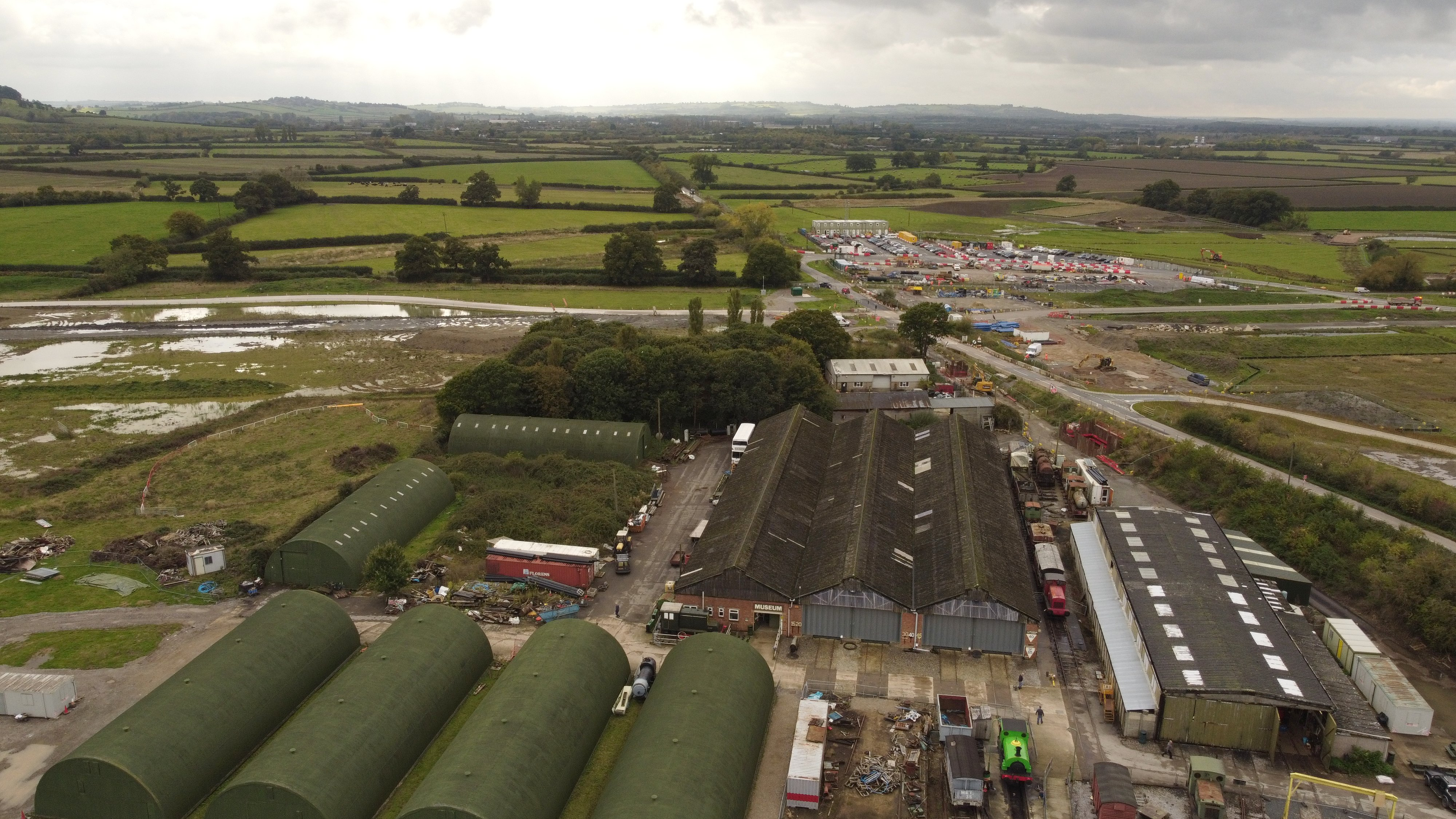
Green "Romney" structures and central brick building of the former buffer depot in Quainton. The site is currently used by the Buckinghamshire Railway Centre.

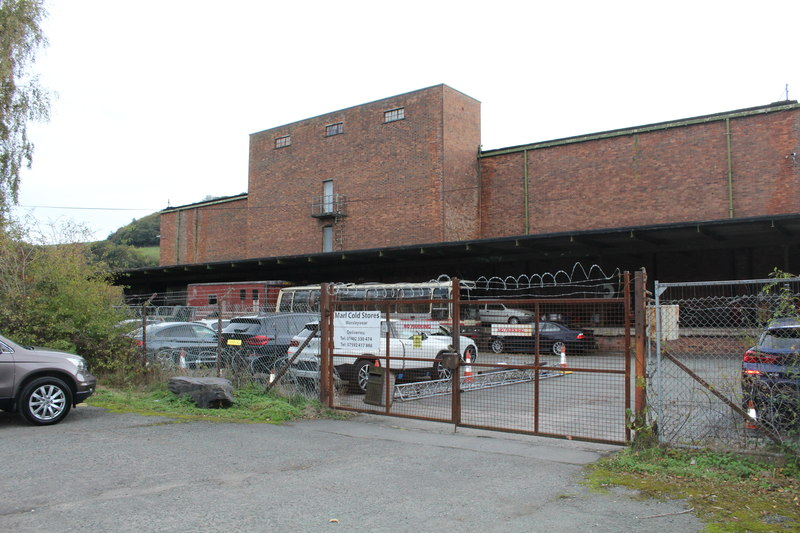
Former buffer depot in the vicinity of Llandudno Junction.

The use of "buffer depots" to store food and other strategic materials began during the Second World War in response to German anti-shipping efforts. These depots were situated away from civilian habitation, consisted of a varying number of steel-framed brick buildings and green Nissen-style "Romneys", and were served by a combination of rail, road, and canal links. Sixteen grain silos and forty meat cold stores were also established.

The role of the buffer depots in safeguarding Britain's strategic food stockpile would gain greater significance during the Cold War period when it was realised that the country's food supply would be catastrophically disrupted by a nuclear strike. The MAFF (which would turn into the Food and Agriculture Organisation after a strike) would play a central role in government emergency planning, especially with the transition to war period that would occur in the event of NATO being involved in a large-scale conflict in Europe. Control of food distribution was an important part of plans for during and after war; in the period leading up to a war, major food producers would be encouraged to increase output and food rationing would be implemented. Bulk stocks would be moved away from ports and additional buffer depots set up to supplement the peacetime network. The primary purpose of the stockpile was to serve as a food reserve to feed survivors of a nuclear strike until normal food supply arrangements could be re-established; after an initial period in which regional food officers would seize surviving commercial stocks and redistribute them, those regional officials would work with the Food and Agriculture Organisation to release its food stocks to county-level officials who would then oversee distribution to emergency feeding centres. However, the stockpile held a limited variety of foodstuffs "chosen for their value in providing energy and nutrition" and was not intended to provide a balanced diet to survivors. Over a hundred buffer depots existed for much of the Cold War, with there being 136 depots in 1966; by 1995, this figure had fallen to sixty-seven depots.

While mostly intended for post-attack use, the buffer depots' contents could be released in other circumstances; for example, sugar stocks were released to reduce the impact of a national shortage in the 1970s.

Among the foodstuffs that were part of the Cold War-era stockpile were:

- Sweet biscuits, which came in large tins and were mostly baked around the early 1960s (though some individual depots such as the one in Adwick le Street had stocks dating as far back as the 1940s).
- Fats, principally in the form of margarine (known as 'Ministry Marge') with an expected shelf life of twenty years
- Sugar, held in 56 lb sacks and turned over according to rate of deterioration
- Flour, which was produced according to a high-protein, low-moisture recipe and was turned over every four to five years
- Yeast, packed in tins with an expected shelf life of ten years
- Hard glucose sweets, produced in small numbers on cost grounds
- Tinned meat, principally corned beef (1960s)
- Cake mix (1960s)

The storage of the food stocks was not without problems; margarine containers tended to mould and stacks were liable to collapse, while sugar and flour sacks were regularly punctured by warehouse workmen in order to make them more stackable at the cost of negating the intended protection against moisture ingress and rodent damage. The stocks were also subject to pilferage, while the ability of the mostly Second World War-era buildings to avoid damage from the blast effects of a nuclear weapon was dubious. Even if most of the depot network was to survive a nuclear strike, there were regular concerns at an official level (let alone in independent analysis) that the total tonnage of the stockpile would be inadequate to feed the surviving population (typically estimated at some forty million who would need feeding for up to three months until imports were reestablished).

In addition to foodstuffs, the depots contained an estimated 400,000 cooking items (Soyer boilers, baking trays, No. 4 Field Cookers, "dixie" camp kettles, and so on) and 1.4 million bowls and spoons, as well as Second World War-era mobile bakeries, tarpaulins and tents, hurricane lamps, hammer mills for making flour, and emergency grain elevators and dischargers. This equipment stockpile was also perceived as being inadequate to meet the needs of a post-strike population.

With the end of the Cold War, the buffer depots began being stood down from July 1991 onwards; the stockpile was initially meant to be retained in a "smaller, more flexible" state with a focus on ready-to-eat foodstuffs rather than raw ingredients, but in February 1993 it was decided that modern food supply practices were now sufficiently robust for commercial stocks to meet "expected needs in the aftermath of any conceivable attack" and so the government stockpile could be disposed of completely, with this decision being made public that March. By November 1995, the last depots had closed; while a number of depots would remain in MAFF (and, later, DEFRA) possession after this date, disposal efforts were noted as "nearing completion" in March 2002.

Duncan Campbell compiled a comprehensive (but not complete) (Note: Quoting Campbell, "[t]he information in this table is mostly extracted from telephone directories, over a period of years. It is therefore necessarily both incomplete and out of date. MAFF refuse to supply a list of Buffer Depots[.]") list of buffer depot locations in his book War Plan UK.

Home Defence Region	Depot number (if known)	Address	Operator (if known) (Note: Commercial companies who stocked the depots on behalf of the MAFF and are enumerated as follows: 1. Newcastle Warehousing Co. Ltd; 2. R Steenberg and Sons Ltd (Newcastle); 3. Free Trade Wharf Co. Ltd; 4. New Fresh Wharf Co. Ltd; 5. Inland Warehousing Ltd; 6. Brooks Wharf and Bull Wharf Ltd; 7. Co-ordinated Traffic Services Ltd; 8. Robert Warner Ltd; 9. Weber, Smith and Hoare Ltd; 10. Sterling Wharfage Co. Ltd; 11. J. Spurling Ltd; 12. British and Foreign Wharf Co.Ltd; 13. Butlers Wharf Ltd; 14. J. Leete and Sons Ltd; 15. Ceylon Wharf Ltd; 16. J. W. Cook and Co. Ltd; 17. Hay's Wharf Ltd; 18. Trinity Wharf Co. Ltd; 19. Lovell C. Shaw and Sons Ltd; 20. MacLaines (Travel and Forwarding) Ltd; 21. J. Warriner Ltd; 22. Ford and Canning (1947) Ltd; 23. E. E. Roper and Co. Ltd; 24. Longton Storage and Warehouses Ltd; 25. Cheshire Storage Co. Ltd; 26. North Western Storage Co. Ltd; 27. Cory Associated Wharves Ltd; 28. Lancashire Storage Co. Ltd; 29. LUKWA Storage Ltd; Scottish depots were overseen by the Scottish Home and Health Department (SHHD).)	Notes
1	322	Wooler, Northumbria	1	
2	104T	Melbourne Avenue, Topcliffe Road, Thirsk, Yorks (Note: The 1997 National Asset Register list gives an address of Melbourne Place and describes the depot as actually being in Sowerby. A 2017 North Yorkshire Council planning committee document also refers to Sowerby, but says the site is accessible from Melbourne Place rather than being located there. The TeamKits business that is currently located on the premises refers to the depot as being at Melbourne Place and as being in Thirsk rather than Sowerby; the SportsLogistics business that also occupies the site also describes it as being in Thirsk but makes no mention of Melbourne Place.)	2	Closed on 31 July 1991, still in MAFF possession as of January 2000 at which point it was said that the site's planning status had taken "far longer" to be determined than expected but it was due to be put on the market "shortly". The site was still in DEFRA possession as of July 2012. Thereafter, the site or individual parts of the site have had various private owners including an antiques firm and sportswear companies.
2	104V	Station Road, Kirkdale, Yorks	3	
2	104Z	Easingwold, Yorks	3	
2	351B	Rothwell, Leeds, Yorks	3	
2	351H	Drighlington, Bradford, Yorks	3	
2	464	Whitley Bridge, Leeds	5	
2	464E	Churchill Road, Doncaster	5	
2	464F	Full Sutton Airfield, Great Driffield, Yorks	5	
2	464G	Planet Road, Adwick-le-Street, Yorks	5	In 1988, a group of schoolchildren broke into the depot and consumed some of its biscuits (dating back to 1943) and sweets, after which they developed stomach pains. The MAFF then announced that the depot was closing down, though any link between this and the schoolchildren's break-in was denied.
2	337	Doncaster	4	
2	337L	Harleston Road, Old Mill Lane, Barnsley	4	
2	906G	Selby, Yorks	5	
2	87	Gamston Airfield, Nottingham	4	
3	336	Main Road, Smalley Gate, Notts	7	
3	336HJ	New Street, Earl Shilton, Leics	8	Closed on 17 March 1994, still in MAFF possession as of January 2000 at which point sale arrangements were "in hand".
3	336K	Little Glen Road, Glen Parva, Leics	6	Closed on 31 March 1993, still in MAFF possession as of January 2000 at which point sale arrangements were due to be concluded within a matter of months.
3	336M	Humberstone Lane, Thurmaston, Leics	6	
3	336N	Harleston Road, New Dunston, Northants	6	
3	336T	Coxmoor Road, Sutton-in-Ashfield, Notts	6	
3	559A	Crick Road, Hillmorton, Northants	9	
3		Memory Lane, Belgrave Gate, Leicester	7	
3		Mackin Street, Derby	7	
3		Fiskerton Airfield, Lincoln	6	
3		Station Road, Castle Donington, Leics	7	
3	336P	New Unit 70, 10 Romany Way, Market Harborough, Leics	7	
4		The Drift, Royston, Herts	10	
4		Tempsford Airfield, Sandy, Beds	10	
4		Royston Road, Godmanchester, Cambs	10	
4	19	Hoddesdon, Herts	16	Survives, but the entrance is blocked off.
4	4F	Hertford Road, Hoddesdon, Herts	3	Still in MAFF possession as of November 1997.
4	4L	Huggins Lane, Marshmoor Sidings, Hatfield	3	
4	4M	New Ground, Tring, Herts	3	
4	36	Goodwyns Halt, Hemel Hempstead, Herts	17	
4	90	Manor Way, Borehamwood, Herts		
4		Station Road, Thetford	27	
4	379W	King's Lynn	27	
4		Heath Road, Burwell, Cantab	27	
4	521G	Elsenham Station, Stansted, Essex	7	Survives.
4	521J	Station Road, Marks Tey, Essex	7	
4		St Peters Road, Huntingdon	7	
5	111	Bath Road, Harmondsworth, Middlesex	18	
5	1002D	Walthamstow	4	
5	325	Windmill Road, Sunbury on Thames	9	
5	325E	Commerce Road, Brentford	9	
5	16B	Hounslow	15	
5		Rotherhithe Street, Bermondsey		
6	339	Station Road, Betchworth, Surrey	13	
6	339	Westerham, Kent	13	First used during World War II
6	528A	Forstal Road, Aylesford, Kent	14	
6	528E	Lamberhurst Quarter, Tunbridge Wells	14	
6	528M	Fairoaks Airport, near Cobham	14	
6		Pattenden Lane, Marden, Tonbridge		
6	124	Frenches Road, Redhill	13	
6	139B	Hook (Daneshill Works), Surrey	13	
6	347	The Broyle, Ringmer, Sussex	13	
6	366	Quainton, Bucks	11	Currently owned by the Quainton Railway Society who acquired the site in 1997; the brick building is used as a museum and reserve collection store while the Romney huts are used for general storage.
6	366C	Saunderton, High Wycombe, Bucks	11	
6	450	Freeland, Oxon	12	
6	450F	Kidlington, Oxon	12	
6	357	Station Road, South Leigh, Witney, Oxon	12	Still in MAFF possession as of November 1997.
6	450G	Culham, Oxon	12	
6	450H	Kennington, Oxon	12	
6	450J	Grimsbury Road, Banbury	12	
6		Eastlee, Deal	13	
6		Liphook	13	
6		Old Woking	13	
7	68	Exeter	20	
7	361	West Pennard, Street, Somerset	20	
7	361	Hallatrow, Temple Cloud, Somerset	21	
7	362A,S	Badminton, Avon	19	
7	363T	Gorlands Road, Chipping Sodbury, Avon	19	
7	96QQ	Hawthorn	10	
7	96QR (Note: Also recorded as 96R.)	Coped Hall, Wootton Bassett, Wilts	10	Demolished.
7	397	Keynsham, Avon	22	
8		Rheola Works, Neath, Glamorgan	11	
8		Hirwaun Industrial Estate, Hirwaun	11	
9	99	Station Approach, Tewkesbury		
9	469	Badsey, Evesham, Hereford and Worcs	17	
9	4N	Stratford on Avon, Warwicks	17	
9	137AB	Stone, Stoke on Trent	24	
9	137AK,AL	Uttoxeter	24	
9	137AG	Newport, Salop	24	
9	137AP,AQ	Barton under Needwood, Staffs	24	
9	558A	Lichfield, Staffs	23	Survives but is bricked up.
9	558C	Cannock, Staffs	23	
9		Bidavon Industrial Estate, Warwicks		
9		Eclipse Road Trading Estate, Alcester, Warwicks		
9		Kineton Road Industrial Estate, Southam, Warwicks		
9		National Agricultural Centre, Stoneleigh, Kenilworth		
10	314E	Brownedge Lane, Tardy Gate, Preston	28	
10	314QR	Railway Station, Grimsargh, Preston	28	
10	475Q	Orrell Lane, Burscough, Lancs	28	
10	395D	Stanley Street, Blackburn	26	
10	395K	Taylor St, Clitheroe, Lancs	26	
10	395L	Feniscowles, Blackburn, Lancs	26	
10	395N	Broadway, Haslingden, Lancs	26	
10	562	London Road, Adlington, Lancs	25	
10		Gregson Lane, Hoghton	28	
10	544CD	Marston Sheds, Hornby Road, Claughton	29	
10	562C	School Bridge, Dunham Town, Cheshire	25	Demolished and site reused for a housing estate.
10		Cheshire East, Chelford (Note: Identified in War Plan UK as Knutsford Road, Clepford, Cheshire)	25	"The former cold store building is currently occupied by a haulage and storage company [...] They have added a new office building on the Knutsford Road side of the building and infilled the former railway yard area with stores."
10	562E	Raglan Road, Sale	25 (Note: The War Plan UK list has the depot being supplied by North Western Storage Co. Ltd (26), but the Heritage Gateway entry describes it as being supplied by Cheshire Storage Co. Ltd (25) instead.)	Converted into a sports centre by Trafford Borough Council.
10	344B	Tattenhall Road, Tattenhall, Chester (Note: Identified in War Plan UK as Tattenhall but without the full address being given)	25	Sold on 24 July 2004.
10	344CD	Tarporley	25	Built on the site of "Racecourse" Prisoner of War Camp 74. The site was used as a private store for some time, with this or some other private owner offering it for sale as of 2017.
10	344E	Dunham Hill, Thornton-le-Moor	25	Currently used as a private store.
10	344F	Mickle Trafford	25	Survives in light industrial use.
10	344G (Note: The Heritage Gateway entry cites a number of 344B, but this is the number for the Tattenhall depot according to Campbell's War Plan UK list, with the same number being cited in the Heritage Gateway entry for that depot. It is not clear whether any eventual mistake lies with Campbell or with Heritage Gateway.)	Waverton	25	Survives in light industrial use.
Scotland		Home Defence Store, Hayford Mill, Cambusbarron, Stirling	SHHD	
Scotland		Montrose Airfield, Tayside	SHHD	

Other depots included:

Address	Notes
Hoe Bridge, Woking	Assigned a depot number of 528S.
4-5 Almondbank, Perth	Depot at 4 Almondbank was still in MAFF possession as of November 1997. Depot at 5 Almondbank was closed on 29 September 1995 and was still in MAFF possession as of January 2000.
Abergwili Road, Abergwili, Carmarthen	Closed on 28 March 1991, still in MAFF possession as of January 2000.
Caton Road, Claughton, Lancaster	Closed on 31 March 1994, still in MAFF possession as of January 2000 at which point sale arrangements were "in hand".
Trentside, Gunthorpe, Nottingham	Closed on 17 March 1994, still in MAFF possession as of January 2000 at which point a sale to the former landowner's successors was being negotiated.
Kendal Road, Harlescott, Shrewsbury, Salop	Closed on 23 March 1995, still in MAFF possession as of January 2000.
Station Road, Honeybourne, Evesham, Worcs	Still in MAFF possession as of November 1997.
130 Hyndford Road, Lanark	Still in MAFF possession as of November 1997.
Towy Avenue, Llandovery, Dyfed	Still in MAFF possession as of November 1997.
Pocklington Industrial Estate, Pocklington, East Yorks	Still in MAFF possession as of November 1997.
Nant Alyn Road, Rhydymwyn, Mold, Flint	Closed on 30 March 1994, still in MAFF possession as of January 2000 at which point most of the buildings were derelict and the overall site was described as contaminated due to its historic role in manufacturing and storing chemical agents. The buildings were also identified as containing asbestos. The site was still in DEFRA possession as of July 2012.
Former RAF Station, Strubby, Alford, Lincs	Still in MAFF possession as of November 1997. A 1993 document lists two depots at Strubby but does not make it clear whether the former RAF site comprised both depots or just one of them.
Abergavenny	
Alton	
Bishops Lydeard	
Branston	
Chobham	
Dalston	
East Fortune	
Lordscroft Lane, Haverhill	
Humshaugh	
Innerleithen	
Kippings Cross	
Llandow	
Long Hanborough	
Marston Moor	
Milfield	
Newark	
Norton Fitzwarren	
Pollington	
Rattlesden	Currently used as a private store.
Sevenhampton	
Walton Le Dale	
Wheldrake	
Wilstead	
Gloucestershire (near Saul)	
Wellington Markets Hall, Salop	Wartime depot, "derequisitioned" c. 1946.

== Final years ==
The MAFF was widely criticised for its handling of the 1980s outbreak of bovine spongiform encephalopathy (more widely known as mad cow disease) and the 2001 outbreak of foot and mouth disease. The BSE outbreak and other British food safety incidents led to the MAFF having its food safety role handed over to the newly created Food Standards Agency in April 2000, though some MAFF officials would form part of the Agency's initial staffing.

Ministry of Agriculture, Fisheries and Food (Dissolution) Order 2002 (Note: Section 1(1).)
- Statutory Instrument
- Parliament of the United Kingdom
- Citation: SI 2002/794
- Territorial extent: United Kingdom

Dates
- Made: 26 March 2002
- Commencement: 27 March 2002 (Note: Section 1(2).)

Other legislation
- Amends: Land Drainage Act 1976; Agricultural Statistics Act 1979; Deer Act 1991; Water Industry Act 1991; Protection of Badgers Act 1992; Countryside and Rights of Way Act 2000
- Made under: Ministers of the Crown Act 1975
- Amended by: Public Bodies (Abolition of Food from Britain) Order 2014

Status: Amended

Text of statute as originally enacted

Revised text of statute as amended

Text of the Ministry of Agriculture, Fisheries and Food (Dissolution) Order 2002 as in force today (including any amendments) within the United Kingdom, from legislation.gov.uk.

The MAFF was merged with the part of the Department for Environment, Transport and the Regions that dealt with the environment (and with a small part of the Home Office) to create a new government department, the Department for Environment, Food and Rural Affairs (Defra), on 8 June 2001. The Ministry was formally dissolved on 27 March 2002, when the Ministry of Agriculture, Fisheries and Food (Dissolution) Order 2002 (SI 2002/794) came into force.

== See also ==
- Forestry Commission
- Lobbying in the United Kingdom
- Minister of Agriculture, Fisheries and Food
- Sir John Sinclair, 1st Baronet
- Arthur Young

== Bibliography ==
- Sinclair, J. (1796). Account of the Origin of the Board of Agriculture and its progress for three years after its establishment. London: W. Bulmer and Co.
- Chisholm, Hugh, ed. (1911). "Agriculture, Board of" . Encyclopædia Britannica. Vol. 1 (11th ed.). Cambridge University Press. pp. 421–423.
