= Ecojet =

Ecojet or EcoJet may refer to:

- EcoJet (airline), a Bolivian domestic airline.
- Ecojet (British airline), a failed British airline.
- Frigate Ecojet, a Russian program for the development of a new wide-body medium-haul civil aircraft.
- EcoJet concept car, a concept car produced by General Motors.
- EcoJet, a low emissions version of the Multijet engine introduced in the 2016 facelift of the third generation Fiat Fiorino.
