= Specialist Operations (New South Wales) =

New South Wales Police Force
- Motto: Culpam Poena Premit Comes; Punishment Follows Close On Guilt

Agency overview
- Formed: 1862
- Employees: 18,500

Jurisdictional structure
- Operations jurisdiction: New South Wales, Australia
- General nature: Local civilian police

Operational structure
- Headquarters: Parramatta, New South Wales
- Officers: 16,700
- Minister responsible: Mike Gallacher MP, New South Wales Ministry for Police
- Agency executive: Mick Fuller APM, Commissioner
- Units: 11: Counter Terrorist and Disaster Victim Identification Unit; Crime Stoppers Unit; Highway Patrol; Missing Persons Unit; Mounted Police Unit; Marine Area Command; Professional Standards Command; Public Order and Riot Squad; Police Prosecutions Command; State Crime Command; State Protection Group; Traffic Services

Facilities
- Stations: 500+

Website
- http://www.police.nsw.gov.au

The Specialist Operations was a Command within the New South Wales Police Force (NSW Police Force) that was responsible for a range of specialist groups of the police force. The division was headed by the deputy commissioner of the NSW Police, whose position was occupied by Nick Kaldas prior to his retirement.

The Command was replaced by the Investigations & Counter Terrorism Command which overseas a number of specialist units and Commands headed by a Deputy Commissioner.

Various units and groups as listed below have since been moved to other Commands such as Specialist Support Command and Corporate Services Command.

== Groups ==
The Specialist Operations Command was further divided into subgroups which consist of:

- Police Prosecutions
- Counter Terrorism & Special Tactics
- Forensic Services Group
- Operational Communications & Information Command
- Professional Standards Command
- Special Services Group (Including the Marine Area Command and Aviation Support Branch)
- State Crime Command

== Major units ==
=== Counter Terrorism & Special Tactics ===
The Assistant Commissioner (Counter Terrorism) is responsible for both the Counter Terrorism and Special Tactics Command (CTST) and the State Protection Group (SPG). The SPG contains a number of highly trained and specialised units such as the Police Rescue & Bomb Disposal Unit, Dog Squad, Tactical Operations Unit and Witness Security Unit to name but a few.

=== State Crime Command ===
The State Crime Command (SCC) is made up of 12 squads and a number of support units that each specialise in a particular area.

The squads include:

- Fraud Squad
- Drug Squad
- Firearms and Regulated Industries Crime Squad
- Asian Crime Squad
- Sex Crimes Squad
- Gangs
- Homicide
- Middle Eastern Organised Crime Squad
- Property
- Robbery and Serious Crime Squad
- Organised Crime (Targeting) Squad
- Joint Investigation Response Squad

=== Forensic Services Group ===
The Forensic Services Branch provides specialised crime scene support service to Police throughout New South Wales regarding criminal, coronial and incident investigations. The Group comprises a number of specialised sections and retains a number of qualified experts, Police and civilian Scene's of Crime Officers (SOCO's) .

=== Special Services Group ===
The Special Service Group includes units such as the Marine Area Command, known commonly as the 'Water Police' and the Aviation Support Branch, commonly known as "PolAir" referring to the Police Airwing.

==== Aviation Support Branch ====
The Aviation Support Branch currently has a fleet of two Cessna Citation jets and five helicopters, including a Kawasaki BK117 transporter, jointly owned by the NSW Fire Brigades and primarily used to respond to major incidents including HAZMAT, Urban Search & Rescue (USAR), bushfire operations and counter-terrorism/special operations . The Branch also have four Eurocopter Squirrel's for general police work. These are used where required to support searches for missing bushwalkers, vessels or aircraft, specialised rescue missions, bushfire fighting and reconnaissance .

==== Marine Area Command ====
NSW has a large and busy coastline leading to an expansive system of waterways. NSW Police Force maintains a full-time, comprehensive water police service designated the "Marine Area Command".

The NSW Police Marine Area Command's (MAC) responsibility extends to all coastal areas of NSW to 200 nautical miles (400 km) out to sea. From the earliest days of settlement, the state has required a dedicated water based policing service. The services provided by MAC are similar to those carried out by land-based police, including crime prevention and detection, search and rescue and high visibility patrols.

Police vessels and personnel are strategically located at important commercial and leisure ports and harbours along the New South Wales coast, with headquarters at Balmain in Sydney Harbour. They are also based at Broken Bay, Newcastle, Port Stephens, Coffs Harbour, Botany Bay, Port Kembla and most recently Eden. Some remote country waterways are serviced by their Local Area Commands such as Deniliquin in the State's far south west .

The NSW Water Police were the first civilian form of policing established in NSW. In 1789, one year after the colony was founded, Governor Phillip created a 12-person "Row Boat Guard" to patrol Sydney Cove for smugglers and convicts attempting to pass letters to ships anchored in the harbour.

By 1830 an independent Water Police Force was operating. It was merged, with all other Police units, into the NSW Police Department in 1862. In the late-19th century, the Water Police entered the 'modern era' of combustion engines with two steam launches, the 'Bileola' and the 'Argus'. These were used for nearly 35 years before they were replaced with motor launches.

With the introduction of the NSW Police Marine Area Command in July 1999, equipment includes 11 sea going craft and a number of smaller boats, all with electronic navigational aids. MAC employs 123 personnel, including operational water police, marine intelligence unit, marine crime prevention officer, divers, detectives and the Marine Operational Support Team (MOST). "MOST" is the Marine Area Commands version of the Public Order and Riot Squad and assists with operations such as ship boarding and crowd control. Their duties include:

- policing the waterways of NSW to reduce marine crime
- protecting life and property, both at sea and on inland waters
- overseeing aquatic events and controlling spectator craft
- coordinating search and rescue off the coast of NSW
- carrying out diving operations and underwater searches for missing persons and evidence
- maintain and service police launches
- addressing marine crime prevention issues
- safety and compliance reinforcement

== See also ==
- NSW Police Force
- State Protection Group
