= Operations Support Group =

Specialist police within the New South Wales Police Force

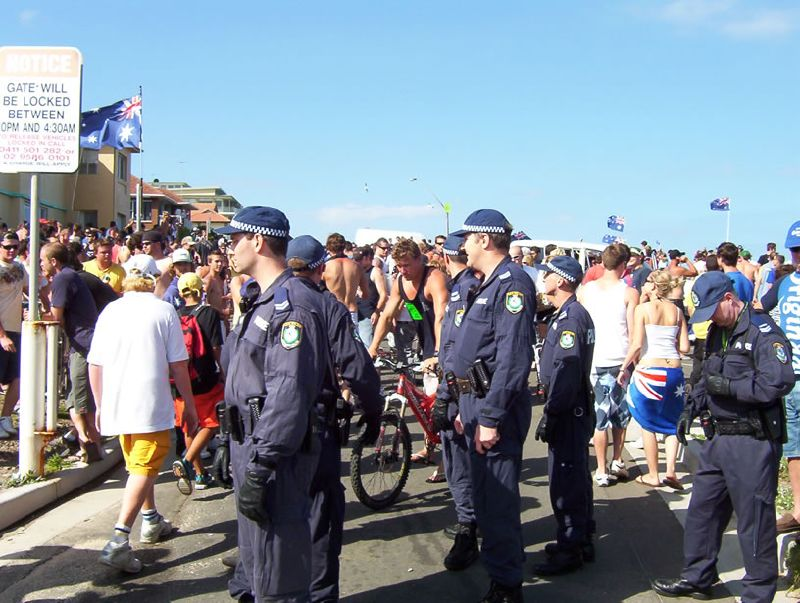
Operations Support Group observing crowds prior to confrontations during the 2005 Cronulla riot.

Operations Support Group (OSG) police are specialist police within the New South Wales Police Force. They are trained in public order (riot) response; weaponless control (hand-to-hand combat); violent prisoner cell extractions; high-value asset protection; navigation and terrain search; bomb searching; and chemical, biological, radiological and nuclear (CBRN) response.

Often mistakenly referred to as the ″operational support group″ by the media and even sections of the NSW Police Force, the OSG form part of the state's public order and high urgency response in areas such as Kings Cross, Redfern, Auburn and the Sydney CBD. Regional areas of New South Wales also have OSG operatives operating in a 'needs basis' capacity, with operatives deployed in regions like Bourke, Grafton and Moree. The majority of OSG trained officers operate in a 'part time' capacity; that is, they have a full-time role in other areas of the Police Force such as General Duties or Highway Patrol, and are called in on a needs basis to fulfill operational requirements.

Metropolitan based regions of the NSW Police Force operate OSG teams in a full time capacity under the titles of "Region Enforcement Squads", with squads existing in North West Metropolitan Region, South West Metropolitan Region, and the Central Metropolitan Region. Officers go on secondment as a full-time OSG operative to these squads.

== History ==
In 1981 the NSW Police Force created the Tactical Response Group (TRG) whose primary tasks included riot control/response, high risk search warrants, searches for missing person, crowd control and bomb search. The TRG's tactical duties were shared between another specialist unit of the time known as Special Weapons and Operations Section(SWOS) with both units fulfilling the role of being the state's official SWAT team. During the Bathurst Riots 1985, the TRG 'showed their mettle' against overwhelming odds, however, more public order specific police were desperately needed. In 1991 both the TRG and SWOS were made defunct and replaced with the Tactical Operations Unit (TOU) whose primary role is specialist counter-terrorist and hostage-rescue functions. The removal of dedicated riot control/response left a shortfall in NSW Police ability to respond/deal with public order incidents.

As such, a small contingent of officers trained in crowd control, then known as the Patrol Support Group (PSG) was formed in various Districts. This name was soon to change from Patrol Support Group to Operations Support Group. The OSG were formed in the now Central Metropolitan Region in the early 1990s, but were limited in both numbers and resources. As a new unit, the OSG's capabilities were unclear to police commanders themselves, and they worked mainly in limited numbers in the Sydney CBD at peaceful rallies and protests.

With the 2006 creation of the Public Order and Riot Squad, OSG units had their title officially changed to the 'Public Order Operations Support Groups' (POOSG). These days, OSG refers to a Regional Unit, whereas POOSG refers to the units as a whole.

== Major Operations ==
=== 1995 Bondi Beach riots ===
The riots began on Christmas evening. After sunset, Bondi Beach grew cold and the estimated 20,000 backpackers from an informal beach party left the beach and milled about blocking Queen Elizabeth Drive. At about 9.30 p.m. aggressive groups of male youths arrived in their cars and contested the space. Violence erupted with an estimated 1,000 people fighting and throwing missiles. Police attempted to move and disperse the crowd but the crowd turned hostile on the police, trashing police cars, obstructing traffic and throwing bottles. Several people were injured, as were police, and serious damage was caused to six police vehicles. No arrests were made due to the extreme congestion of people and the danger confronting police and bystanders.

On New Year's Eve, "car enthusiasts"–Middle Eastern males from southwestern Sydney–came back without cars. Fearful bus drivers carried aggressive and abusive young males across the city to Bondi. By 11.30 p.m. the crowd was estimated at 15,000 and growing, peaking by 2.00 am at 20,000. There were bashings (groups provoking and attacking single males) and stabbings in the Park.

Again, the crowd turned on the police and Bondi Park became a running battle with some 80 General Duties police, some Highway Patrol and two police dogs fighting the 20,000-strong crowd unaided for five hours. During the course of the evening, twelve people were arrested with some 20 charges being laid, mostly concerning 'affray' and 'riotous behaviour'. Police also arrested three people after serious assaults – one juvenile charged with 'malicious wounding' and two adults charged with 'assault with a weapon' (stabbing). All three were convicted and sentenced.

The Bondi Riots were a wake-up call to the NSW community, prompting the then local member Peter Debnam (Vaucluse) to "condemn[s] the Minister for Police for his failure to address serious policing issues at Bondi" (19 Sept. 1996). The few PSG and limited OSG officers were not even able to deploy to the beach front until 6 am New Year's Day, effectively after the event, due to CBD violence they were already engaged with.

=== 2004 Redfern riots ===
See article: 2004 Redfern riots

From this point the recruitment and strength of the OSG was promoted and bolstered. Not known to the public yet and still only used sporadically, it was not until two years of riots back to back that the OSG was brought to the forefront of the state's public order response. The 2004 Redfern riots took place on the evening of Saturday, 14 February 2004 in the inner Sydney suburb of Redfern, sparked by the death of Thomas 'T.J.' Hickey, a 17-year-old Indigenous Australian. Fliers were distributed blaming police for the death, and discontented aboriginal youths gathered from across Sydney. The police closed the Eveleigh Street entrance to the Redfern railway station, but the crowd had turned violent and began to throw bottles, bricks and Molotov cocktails and to use fireworks as missiles. The violence escalated into a full-scale riot around The Block, during which the station was briefly alight, suffering superficial damage. The riot continued into the early morning, until police used fire brigade water hoses to disperse the crowd. One car, stolen in a western suburb, was torched, and 40 police officers were injured. Many OSG deployed complained [as they were officially outranked] that General Duties Police commanders had halted their movement and tactics and had the OSG standing static, akin to sitting ducks, whilst the offenders roamed and rearmed themselves with rocks and molotov fire bombs. One OSG officer was hit directly in the head with a full brick and but for his helmet would surely have perished. The OSG Units then insisted on not only their own Tactical Advisors (TA's) being on the ground with them but on having their high ranking OSG commanders in the field with them, enabling autonomous deployment.

=== 2005 Macquarie Fields riots ===
In February 2005, Macquarie Fields, located in southwestern Sydney, was wracked by violence through the outbreak of a suburban riot which was prompted by the death of two young men during a police pursuit. During this engagement all available OSG from Central and South Western Region were mobilised. Over four days and nights in full riot gear, they contained the mainly government housing estates and made numerous arrests for serious offences including assault, riot and affray. To the state's police command the OSG had proven their worth. Before the year was over on 4 December 2005, a group of volunteer surf lifesavers were assaulted by a group of young men of Middle Eastern appearance, with several other violent assaults occurring over the next week. This triggered the Cronulla Riots, which lasted roughly 48 hours with Middle Eastern reprisal attacks across Cronulla and Maroubra suburbs that same evening. Again it was the OSG who were immediately brought into the fray and with the help of GD, HWP, Mounted and Dog Squad, were able to restore order to the city within 72 hours.

The value of the OSG officers was cemented and the New South Wales Police Force Public Order and Riot Squad (PORS) was then created as a full-time riot squad in January 2006. At the time of creation all PORS Commanders and Officers were taken solely from the OSG ranks. The formation of PORS has now created a full-time avenue for OSG personnel beyond the mainly 'on-call' OSG response. The tactics and training of the OSG and PORS are identical and the PORS Commander, Chief Superintendent Steve Cullen, is now also the head of the OSG.

=== 2005 Cronulla riots ===
See article: 2005 Cronulla riots

The 2005 Cronulla riots were a series of sectarian clashes and mob violence in Australia, originating in the Sydney suburb of Cronulla, New South Wales, and spreading, over the next few nights, to additional suburbs.

On 4 December 2005, a group of volunteer surf lifesavers were assaulted by a group of young men of Middle Eastern appearance, with several other violent assaults occurring over the next week. These incidents were widely commented on in the Sydney media and are considered to be a key factor in a racially motivated confrontation the following weekend. Racial tensions were already prevalent among the two racial groups due to the Sydney Gang Rapes of 2000, among other social incidents, which likely contributed to the scale of the escalation, even though a later review by New South Wales Police found that the initial incident was no more significant, of itself, than other fights between the two racial groups.

A crowd gathered on the morning of Sunday, 11 December 2005 and, by midday, approximately 5,000 people gathered at Cronulla beach to protest against the recent spate of violence against locals. However, fuelled by alcohol, the crowd turned to violence when a young man of Middle Eastern appearance was spotted on the beach. He was surrounded by a crowd outside a local hotel and attacked, along with similar attacks later that day. Retaliatory riots also took place that night and on subsequent nights, resulting in extensive property damage and several more assaults, including one stabbing and even some attacks against ambulance and police officers.

=== APEC Australia 2007 ===
APEC Australia 2007 was a series of political meetings held around Australia between the 21 member economies of the Asia-Pacific Economic Cooperation during 2007. The event culminated in Leaders' Week, where the heads of government of each member economy attended Sydney from 2–9 September 2007. The Sydney CBD was enclosed in a steel-and-concrete fence line. Some 550 OSG and 50 PORS (the state's full contingent) were deployed daily to secure the leaders. On 6 September 2007, a TV show entitled The Chaser's War on Everything gained access through the outer perimeter using a full false 'Canadian flagged' motorcade and false APEC passes. A comedian from the show halted the charade near the Intercontinental Hotel. At the time, this hotel housed heads of state and had PORS, OSG and US Secret Service personnel in, on and around the building. The comedian, wearing a full Bin Laden mock outfit, exited one of the vehicles to be arrested by state police. The stunt was seen as not only in poor taste but very dangerous to the comedian's crew and hired drivers who had little idea of the US and State police orders regarding perceived-threat response. On 8 September 2007, the largest of the APEC protest rallies was held with up to 10,000 attending. OSG again formed the bulk of the policing response along with their parent unit, PORS. An unseen protester began throwing steel darts at the unprotected heads of the OSG, one dart hitting an OSG chief inspector in the head. A rescue squad officer climbed the roof of a police bus and spotted the offender. His description was noted and an OSG sergeant and three OSG officers pursued him through the crowd. Upon seeing police, the offender struck an OSG constable in the forehead with a solid iron bar which he had covered with one sheet of newspaper as a disguise. The offender also struck the OSG sergeant with the bar before being taken to the ground and arrested.

Later that same day, the protesters were sealed in the northern end of Hyde Park by police. A standoff ensued between the crowd and police. At one point roughly 20 protesters covered their faces simultaneously, but after seeing the overwhelming resources of PORS and the OSG, removed the coverings and left the CBD without incident.

Since this date, the OSG have been deployed in numerous public order and enforcement roles. Both the South West Metropolitan Region and Central Metropolitan Region OSG are utilised on an almost daily basis. Along with PORS they are sent week-in week-out into the state's 'hot spots' of crime and confront many violent elements including OMCG, Middle Eastern and Southeast-Asian organised crime members. Since 2009, the South West Metropolitan Region has had a full-time OSG unit.

== Training ==
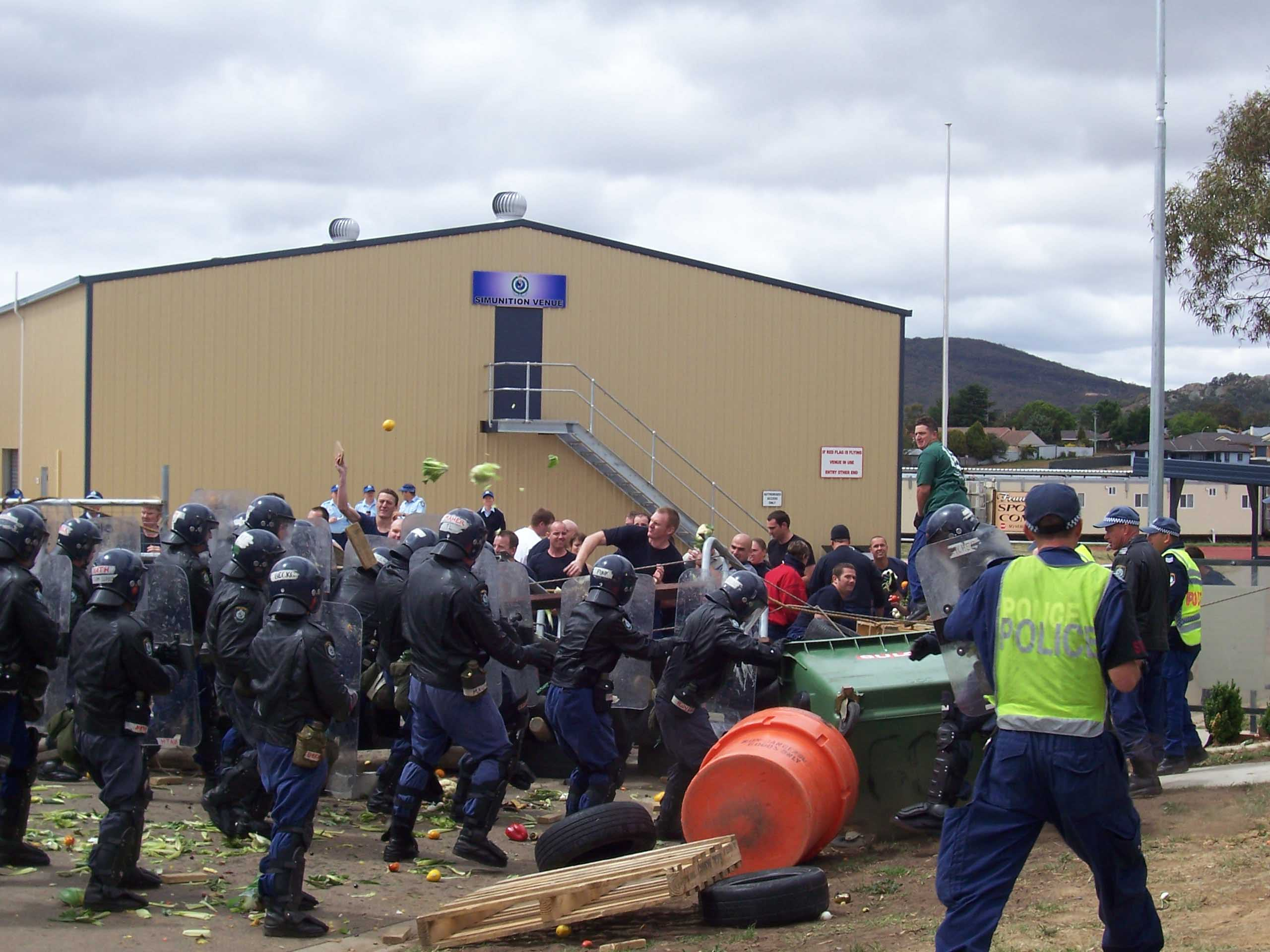
Operations Support Group undertaking mock riot training at the NSWPF Academy in 2006.

Police Force staff wanting to undertake the OSG Basic Operators Course must be able to run to Level 9.9 on the Multi-stage fitness test; complete an agility course in under 2 minutes; and undertake medical testing before they are accepted onto the selection course.

OSG recruits are then sent to the Police Academy grounds in Goulburn and are put through paramilitary-type training for a 21-day period. This includes daily drill, uniform inspection, theory lessons, lectures, physical training and team building exercises along with OSG core training. Before undertaking any other training for the day, each morning recruits do a "warm up" where they run roughly 4.5 kilometres, whilst often wearing an S10 NBC Respirator. After this, physical training commences with sessions consisting of stretcher, log runs or litter carries that are again nearly 5 kilometres in length around the undulating hills of the academy. Recruits on the course experience large gains in cardiovascular fitness, entering the course with Multi-stage fitness test scores of 9.9 and upon retesting halfway through the course, attain scores of upwards of 11.5.

Over the 21 day course, OSG are taught riot control/response; breaching and building clearance; search and rescue skills for missing person search; crowd control technique; bomb search technique; disaster victim identification; chemical, biological and radiological (CBR) incident response; and disaster victim identification.

The second last day of OSG selection requires OSG personnel to undertake a full scale CBRN drill suits and perform team tasks for a period of 8 hours; each five-person team is rotated through tasks that include crowd control, physical training and other intense functions. During this period no recruit is allowed to break the seal of his or her NBC suit or gas mask and must take liquids through an in-built mask straw. If recruits break the seal on their suit or mask, they fail the course. After final intense full unit litter carry is then conducted before recruits are placed into a CS (tear gas) filled tent where they complete a set of CBRN drills.

Only after breathing in a satisfactory amount of CS gas, and conducting various self defense drills in the gas, are recruits allowed to exit the tent. Each OSG recruit must do this tent drill three times in a row.

The final day of the selection course involves several mock riot scenarios in the Police Academy training village. Students and staff of the police academy form the crowds, in which the remaining course recruits must manage and dissolve the crowd within certain time limits. Historically, the crowds have ranged in size from 50 to 200 people, with OSG operative numbers rarely exceeding 45 people due to course attrition. This 1:4 ratio highlights the skill and team work abilities imparted upon OSG operatives, along with the mindset the course cultivates within individuals to overcome the often overwhelming odds faced as a trained OSG operative.

== See also ==
- New South Wales Police Force
- Public Order and Riot Squad
- State Protection Group
- Riot
- Riot Police
- Riot shield
