= Dale Vince =

English business magnate (born 1961)

Dale Vince OBE
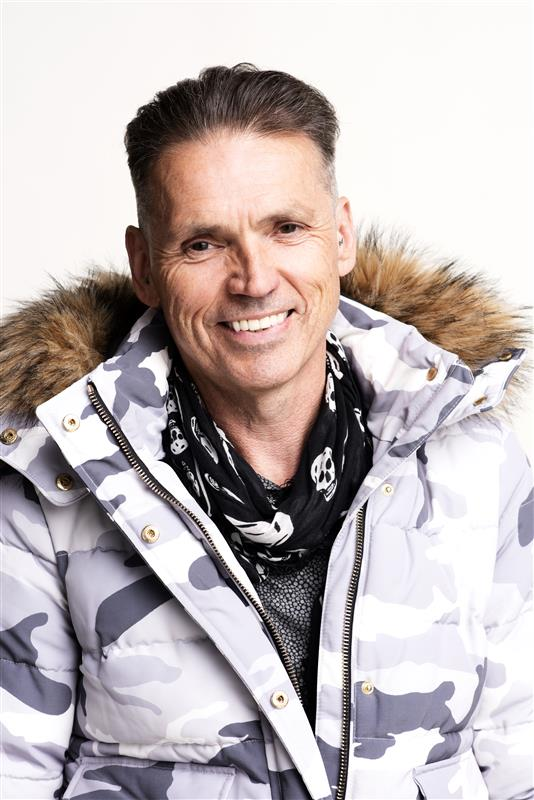
- Vince in 2020
- Born: Dale Andrew Vince; 29 August 1961 (age 65); Great Yarmouth, Norfolk, England
- Occupation: Business magnate
- Years active: 1995–present
- Known for: Owner of Ecotricity; chairman/owner of Forest Green Rovers
- Spouses: Kathleen Wyatt (m. 1981; div. 1992) Kate Lane (m. 2006; div. 2024)
- Children: 3
- Website: dalevince.com

Dale Andrew Vince (born 29 August 1961) is an English business magnate. A former New Age traveller, he is the owner of the electricity company Ecotricity. Born in Norfolk, he founded the Renewable Energy Company in 1995 and launched his first wind turbine in 1996. He also creates artificial diamonds using carbon dioxide from the atmosphere and renewable energy.

Vince became a major shareholder and chairman of professional football club Forest Green Rovers in 2010, implementing eco-friendly initiatives and turning it into the world's first all-vegan football club. The team was recognised as the world's first carbon-neutral football club, the solar panels on the stadium gifted for free by the manufacturer. The club reached League One in 2022, facing opponents including Sheffield Wednesday. At the end of the 2023–24 season, Forest Green Rovers were relegated back into the National League.

Vince was appointed OBE in 2004 and received an honorary degree in 2013. He faced a financial claim court case from his ex-wife, which was settled in 2016. Vince has donated to both the Labour Party and the Green Party and endorsed politicians from both parties in general elections. In 2022 his net worth was estimated at £107 million.

== Early life ==
Dale Andrew Vince was born on 29 August 1961 in Great Yarmouth, Norfolk, the second of three children to parents who ran a Fenland haulage firm. After leaving school aged 15, he spent time as a New Age traveller.

In 1980, Vince participated in the occupation of RAF Molesworth after it was chosen as a base for the US Air Force's mobile nuclear armed Ground Launched Cruise Missile. He was also one of the new age travellers present at the Battle of the Beanfield at Stonehenge in 1985.

== Career ==
In 1991, Vince saw his first wind farm ("I thought, either I can carry on by myself with the windmill on my van, or I can get into the big stuff") and, in 1995, he founded the Renewable Energy Company, which eventually changed its name to Ecotricity. In 1996, he launched his first wind turbine supplying "green electricity". The following year, he attended the conference in Kyoto, Japan, that produced the Kyoto Protocol.

In November 2010, Vince debuted Nemesis, which has been described by The Guardian and The Daily Telegraph as "Britain's first green supercar". Nemesis is a modified Lotus Exige owned and developed by Vince. The car broke the UK land speed record for electric vehicles in September 2012, averaging 151.6 mph (244 km/h) while travelling along a mile-long course. The name is now used on Vince's marine conservation vessel Nemesis.

In 2012, Vince founded the Green Britain Foundation, a charitable organisation dedicated to the protection of the natural environment and the promotion of physical recreation. The same year, Vince helped establish the Electric Superhighway, a network of electric vehicle charging stations positioned along Britain's motorways. He sold the network to Gridserve in 2021.

In 2019, Vince founded Devil's Kitchen, a company that provides vegan meals to schools and colleges. As of 2024, the company was serving approximately one in four British primary schools. He published his first book, Manifesto, in 2020. Manifesto went on to become a Sunday Times bestseller in April 2023.

In October 2020, The Guardian reported that Vince had plans to create artificial diamonds by chemical vapor deposition using "carbon dioxide captured directly from the atmosphere to form the diamonds – which are chemically identical to diamonds mined from the earth – using wind and solar electricity, with water collected from rainfall." This plan was realised as a company called SkyDiamond, which produced its first 15 diamonds in December 2021 and released a full jewellery line in October 2022. In July 2025 he announced they additionally make quantum diamonds for use in sensors.

In April 2022, Vince announced he planned to sell Ecotricity and go into politics. He said part of the reason was that a new owner "can achieve even more, faster. We've got a massive pipeline of projects that need to be built requiring £2 billion of investment." As well as developing his interest in politics, he would focus on renewable projects such as tidal lagoons and geothermal energy. In November of the same year, he said that he had halted plans to sell the company.

In June 2023, Vince announced plans to implement an "eco-curriculum" across 12,000 UK schools by 2025 through his Ministry of Eco Education. The curriculum, which seeks to teach pupils about the natural world and the climate crisis, had previously been tested in a pilot scheme featuring 25 schools in 2022.

In July 2023, Vince announced the founding of Ecojet, an airline which intended to operate planes powered by hydrogen-derived electricity. Ecojet's first flights were originally scheduled to take place in 2024, before being delayed to summer 2025. On 20 January 2026, liquidators were appointed following a winding-up order against the company, which had never operated commercial flights.

=== Media ===
In November 2024, Vince expressed an interest in buying The Observer from Guardian Media Group, saying he would hold the title in a trust to protect its editorial independence; the paper had been in exclusive sale negotiations with Tortoise Media.

In November 2025, Vince launched Babelfish, a media platform focused on energy and the environment and edited by former Daily Express editor Gary Jones. Its first print edition, an eight-page issue on energy market reform, was distributed to UK politicians ahead of the November 2025 Budget.

In September 2026, Vince announced a rescue package to invest in the Camden New Journal and its sister titles, the Islington Tribune and the Westminster Extra; the announcement stated that they would remain independent.

== Football ==
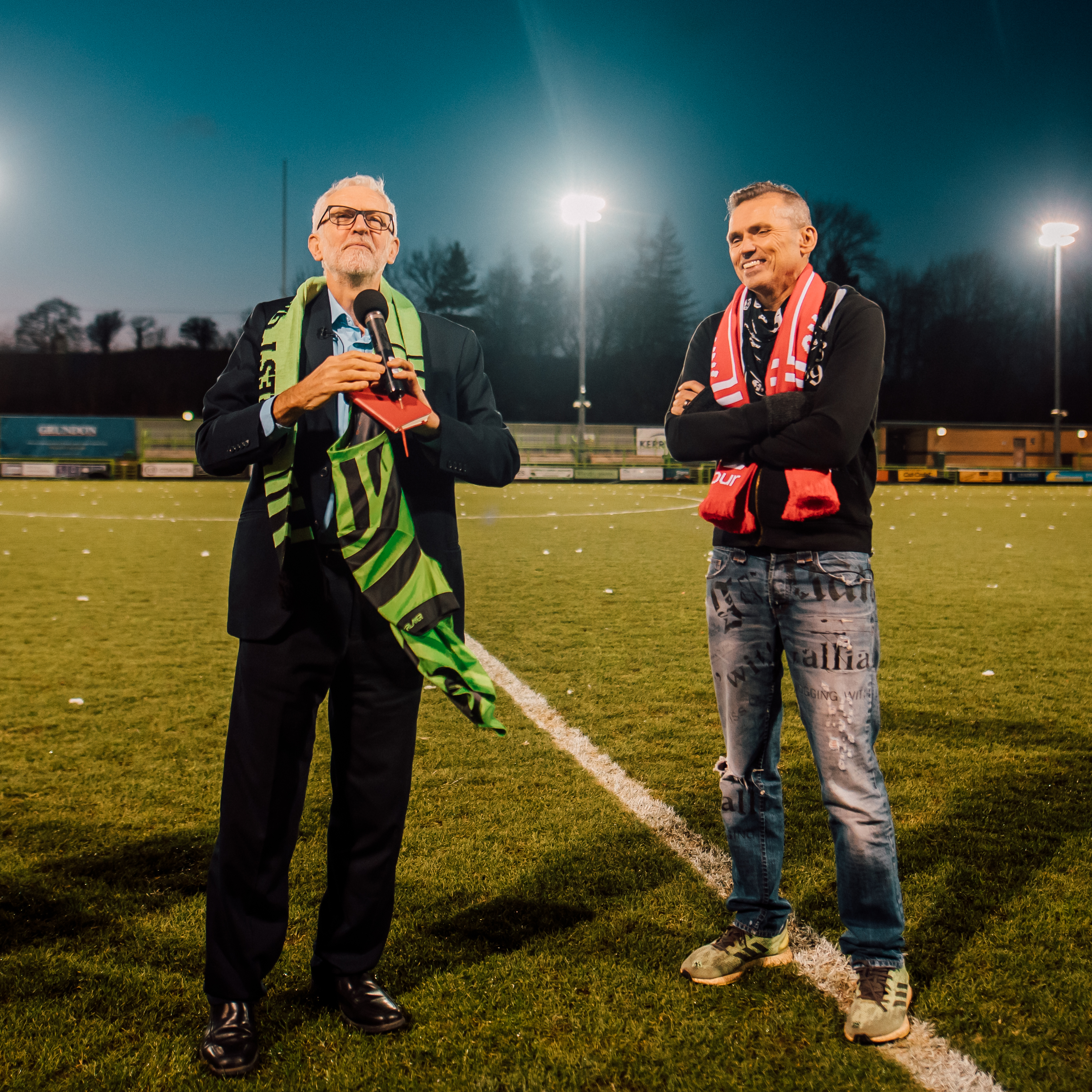
Jeremy Corbyn and Vince (right) at Forest Green Rovers FC in 2019

In 2010, Vince became a major shareholder of Forest Green Rovers FC, and three months later was appointed club chairman. In February 2011, Rovers players were banned from eating red meat for health reasons, and a few weeks later the sale of all red meat products was banned at the club's ground, leaving only vegetarian options and free-range poultry and fish from sustainable stocks.

Vince introduced a number of different eco-friendly developments at the club including the installation of solar panels on its New Lawn home ground, the use of a solar-powered robot grass mower, and the creation of the world's first organic football pitch.

In September 2015, Vince revealed Forest Green were using a player recruitment method similar to the 'Moneyball' model that had been initially used in baseball to sign players by using computer-generated analysis. In October 2015, Forest Green became the world's first all vegan football club.

In 2021, the team became the first in the world to play in a football kit made from a composite material consisting of recycled plastic and coffee grounds.

The United Nations has recognised Forest Green Rovers as the world's first carbon-neutral football club and it was described by FIFA as the "greenest team in the world". In 2024, Forest Green lost their English Football League status after suffering two successive relegations.

== Honours ==
Vince was appointed an Officer of the Order of the British Empire (OBE) in the 2004 New Year Honours for "services to the Environment and to the Electricity Industry".

In 2013, he was given the honorary degree of Doctor of Philosophy by the University of Gloucestershire.

== Personal life ==
While studying, Vince met and married Kathleen Wyatt, two years his senior and with a child of her own, in 1981. The couple subsequently became New Age travellers together, living off state benefits. They had a son together, Dane, in 1983. They separated some years later, and Wyatt reportedly raised the couple's son largely alone thereafter. They divorced in 1992.

Speaking on BBC Points West on 2 June 2025, Vince recalled being present at the Battle of the Beanfield in 1985.

Vince is vegan. He has campaigned to end animal farming and in 2024 urged Labour to do away with a law that compels English schools to serve meat and dairy. In January 2025, Vince announced that Ecotricity had opened a fully plant-based workplace canteen at its facility in Stroud, Gloucestershire.

=== First divorce and financial claim court case ===
After Vince had made his fortune, Wyatt, who had lived what was later described in court as "16 years of real hardship", lodged a financial claim of £1.9 million against Vince in 2011, nearly 20 years after their divorce.

The Court of Appeal rejected the claim, stating it had "no real prospect of success" and was an "abuse of process". However, in March 2015 the Supreme Court set aside this decision, ruling that there was no time limit in law for claims for financial provision, and the claim could progress in the High Court. Lord Wilson said the court must have regard "to the contribution of each party to the welfare of the family, including by looking after the home or caring for the family", but the claim only had a prospect of "comparatively modest success" with a £1.9 million payout "out of the question".

In a statement, Vince branded the court's decision as "mad". "I feel that we all have a right to move on, and not be looking over our shoulders. This could signal open season for people who had brief relationships a quarter of a century ago". Prior to the case settlement, Vince paid the legal costs for both parties, of over £500,000, as divorce law permits costs to be charged to the combined resources of both parties.

In 2016, the case was settled when Vince agreed to pay £300,000 to Wyatt. He commented that the case had been "a terrible waste of time and money". He stated the settlement barely covered Wyatt's legal fees which he had already paid prior to the settlement. He then repeated his opinion that he was "disappointed that the supreme court decided not to throw out the case, given it was brought over 30 years since the relationship ended" before adding, "There clearly needs to be a statute of limitations for divorce cases – a time limit beyond which a claim cannot be made. Such a thing exists in commercial law for good practical reasons."

=== Second marriage and divorce ===
Vince married Kate Lane, who worked at Ecotricity, in 2006; they have a son.

They divorced in 2024, and on 20 December 2024, the High Court ordered Dale Vince to pay Kate Vince £43.51 million over three annual instalments in a financial settlement related to his businesses, of which he retained ownership. The combined legal bill was about £6 million. Vince claimed in January 2026 that he offered Lane a settlement of £68 million before the court case, and the rejection of that had resulted in numerous court hearings and acrimony with a smaller settlement. They had separated in 2022, and had previously divided their non-business assets, on a broadly equal basis of about £5 million each.

== Politics ==
Vince has made donations to both the Labour Party and the Green Party. Prior to the 2015 UK general election, he was one of several celebrities who endorsed the parliamentary candidacy of the Green Party's Caroline Lucas. He endorsed the Labour Party in the 2019 general election. He has made donations to various Labour Party MPs, as well as environmental protest groups, such as Just Stop Oil, Extinction Rebellion, Greenpeace and Sea Shepherd Conservation Society. In the 2026 Clacton by-election—caused by Nigel Farage resigning then running while subject of a Parliamentary inquiry for undeclared donations—Vince pledged to support Farage's opponent Count Binface.

Forest Green raised the flag of Palestine during a match in April 2022 "in solidarity with the Palestinian people". Vince said "Palestine has been under siege by Israel – by air, land and sea, for decades. The US allows this, pumps billions into Israel to support its economy and military and uses its veto to block any meaningful action by the UN". He said the West's position in relation to Palestine "stands in stark contradiction to 'our' claims to moral superiority, civilisation and democratic values". Vince has been described as "anti-Israel" and "anti-Zionist" by The Jerusalem Post, which wrote that he was using the Forest Green Rovers "as a means to promote his anti-Israel agenda".

On Times Radio, in the immediate aftermath of the 2023 Hamas-led attack on Israel, Vince stated that "one man's terrorist is another man's freedom fighter" when asked about Hamas. The deputy leader of the Labour Party, Angela Rayner said Vince's remark was "appalling". Vince said his remark was taken from a doctored video clip and that, in the same interview, he had agreed that Hamas were terrorists and Israel had a right to defend itself.

In July 2024, Vince sued the owners of the political blog Guido Fawkes for libel, claiming that the site implied he supported Hamas by circulating a clip of the Times Radio interview that featured only the "freedom fighter" remark with no additional context. The Daily Mail, GB News, and Tory MP Michael Fabricant apologised to Vince for advancing similar mischaracterisations of his views. The Daily Mail and GB News also paid Vince legal damages. In February 2025, Paul Staines, the founding editor of Guido Fawkes, agreed to pay £9,995 in damages in order to settle the libel suit against him. Vince has expressed his intention to donate the damages awarded in these suits to Palestinian charities.

After the 2025 Bondi Beach shooting, in which gunmen targeted a Jewish event, Vince said "If antisemitism is rising in the world today then surely on any rational analysis, the biggest single cause of that will be the genocide in Palestine. I condemn all acts of violence and all forms of racism". The comment was criticised by Conservative Party politicians Kemi Badenoch and Kevin Hollinrake.
