= Public Order and Riot Squad =

Police unit in Australia

Public Order & Riot Squad
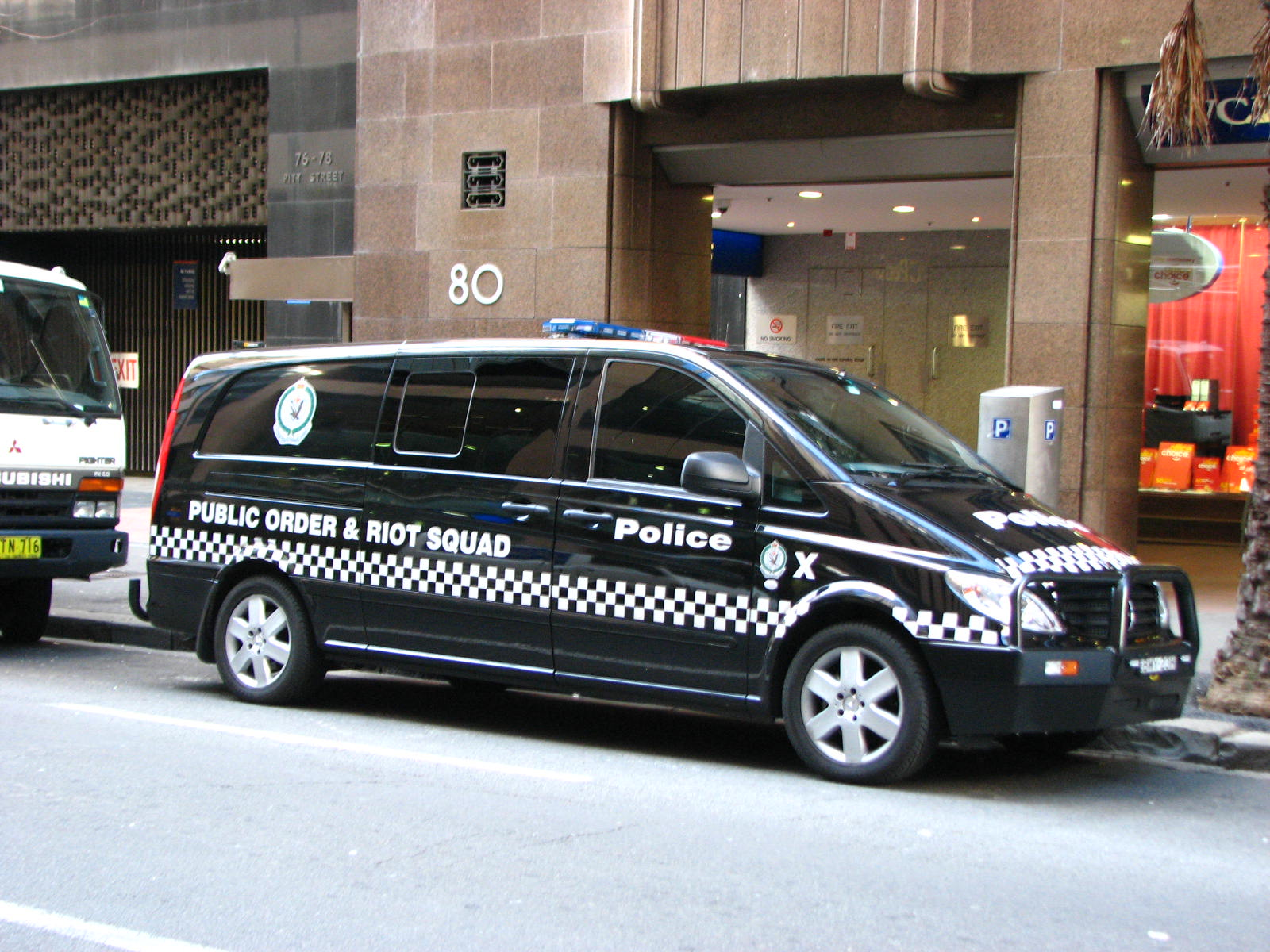
- Public Order and Riot Squad vehicle
- Active: 2006–present
- Country: Australia
- Agency: New South Wales Police Force
- Role: Law enforcement; Riot control
- Part of: Counter Terrorism and Special Tactics Command
- Abbreviation: PORS

Structure
- Sworn officers: 100

Notables
- Significant operation(s): APEC Australia 2007; World Youth Day 2008; 2012 Sydney anti-Islam film protests; Israel–Hamas war protests in Australia

The Public Order & Riot Squad (PORS) is the full-time riot squad of the New South Wales Police Force. PORS reports via the Counter Terrorism and Special Tactics Command to the Deputy Commissioner Investigations and Counter Terrorism.

== History ==
The Public Order and Riot Squad (PORS) is a full-time riot squad. The Squad was created within the Major Events and Incidents Group Command in October 2005. Becoming operational in January 2006 PORS was created as a result of Parliamentary reports into the response and handling of riots in 2004 Redfern riots and 2005 Macquarie Fields riots where command and control and resources were criticized and found to be lacking/uncoordinated. PORS is essentially the re-creation of the defunct Tactical Response Group of the 1980s except for some differences in charter and organisation. They are supplemented by statewide part-time Operations Support Group units.

In 2009, the squad was featured in an episode of 60 Minutes titled "Brute Force" showing officers in action across Sydney.

In 2020 and 2021, there were criticisms that officers from the unit were using excessive force while policing protests.

In January 2026, during New Year's Eve, PORS officers conducted patrols equipped with their long-arm rifles, and days later, also at the Ashes cricket series at the Sydney Cricket Ground.

== Equipment ==
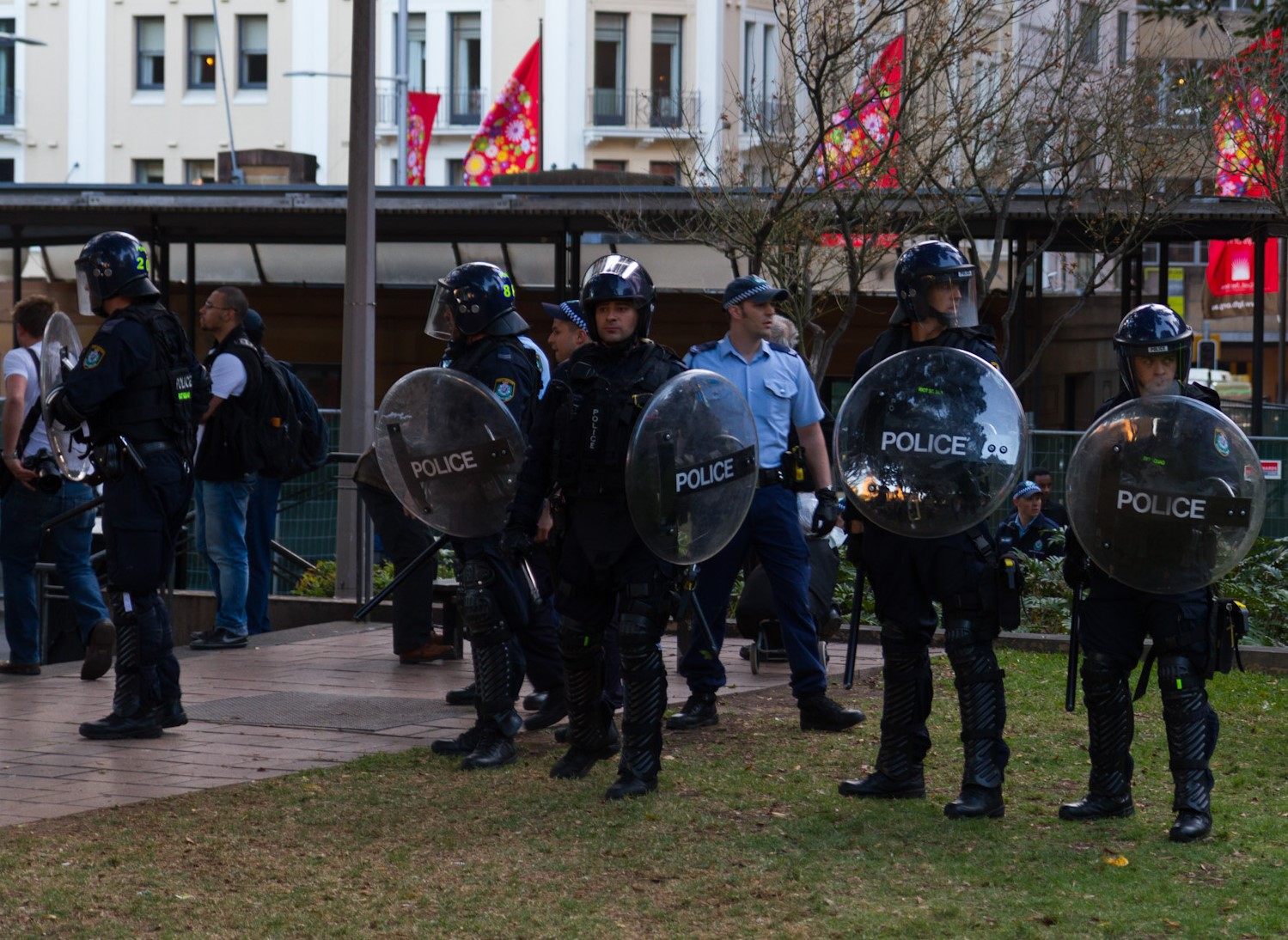
Officers in riot gear

PORS are issued with a wide variety of specialised crowd control and riot equipment including Taser weapons. Their units include fully equipped black vans and black 4WDs to allow rapid deployment across the State at a moments notice. The vans allow a team in full tactical or riot gear to deploy on the move and access equipment as needed quickly, without need to return to a station to access gear as the part-time Public Order and Operations Support Group (OSG) officers do.

At one point, PORS had a water cannon truck intended for use during severe riots. It was the first time any Australian police service had acquired such a vehicle, being purpose built at a cost of $600,000 AUD. The Riot Control Vehicle was equipped with shatterproof "anti-bandit glass" reinforced with wire mesh, and a heavy push bar allowing it to clear barricades and other obstacles. It also was fitted with an airtight cabin to protect police from smoke, gas and other irritants. The high pressure 12,000 litre water cannon is able to shoot a stream of water more than 50 metres. The water cannon having never been "used in anger" was stripped of its police equipment and gifted to Fire and Rescue NSW as a bulk water tanker in 2019.

Each officer is equipped with more than $8500 in gear including flame retardant overalls, ballistic vests, ballistic goggles, arm and leg guards, capsicum spray, an ASP baton, long baton, utility knife, handcuffs cable tie flex-cuffs and rubber bullets. The equipment is stored in station and their patrol units.

In December 2017, the squad was issued with M4 carbine semi-automatic rifles with forty-seven officers trained it is use following the completion of a ten day course. The rest of the squad's fifty officers were planned to have received rifle training by the middle of 2018. The NSW Police Force said that the rifles would provide officers greater accuracy over distance for high-risk incidents and that "each officer will be required to undergo re-accreditation training twice a year". Officers do not ordinarly carry the rifles which are stowed in the squad's cars and are accessed when required.

== Roles ==
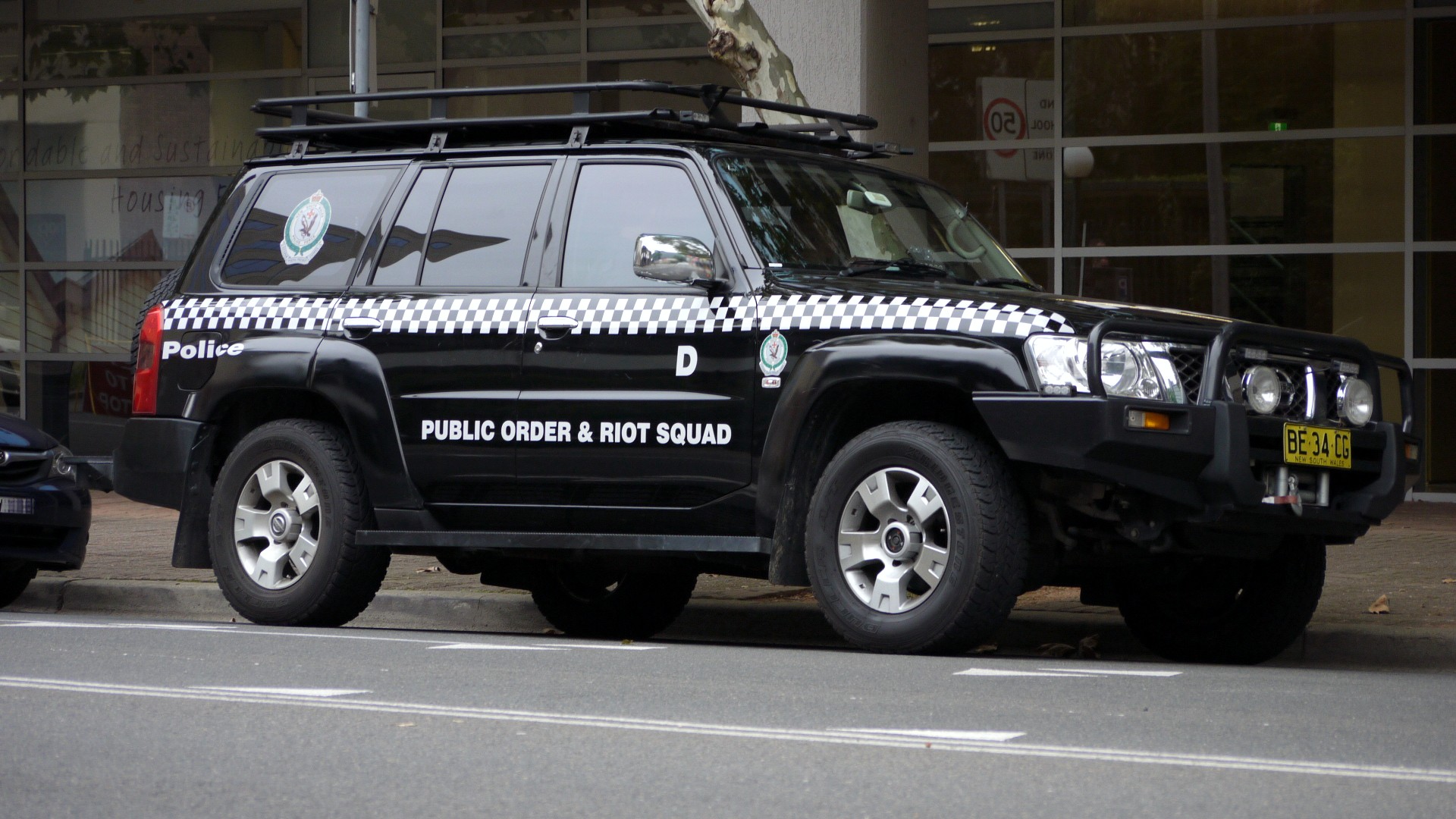
A Public Order and Riot Squad rapid response vehicle.

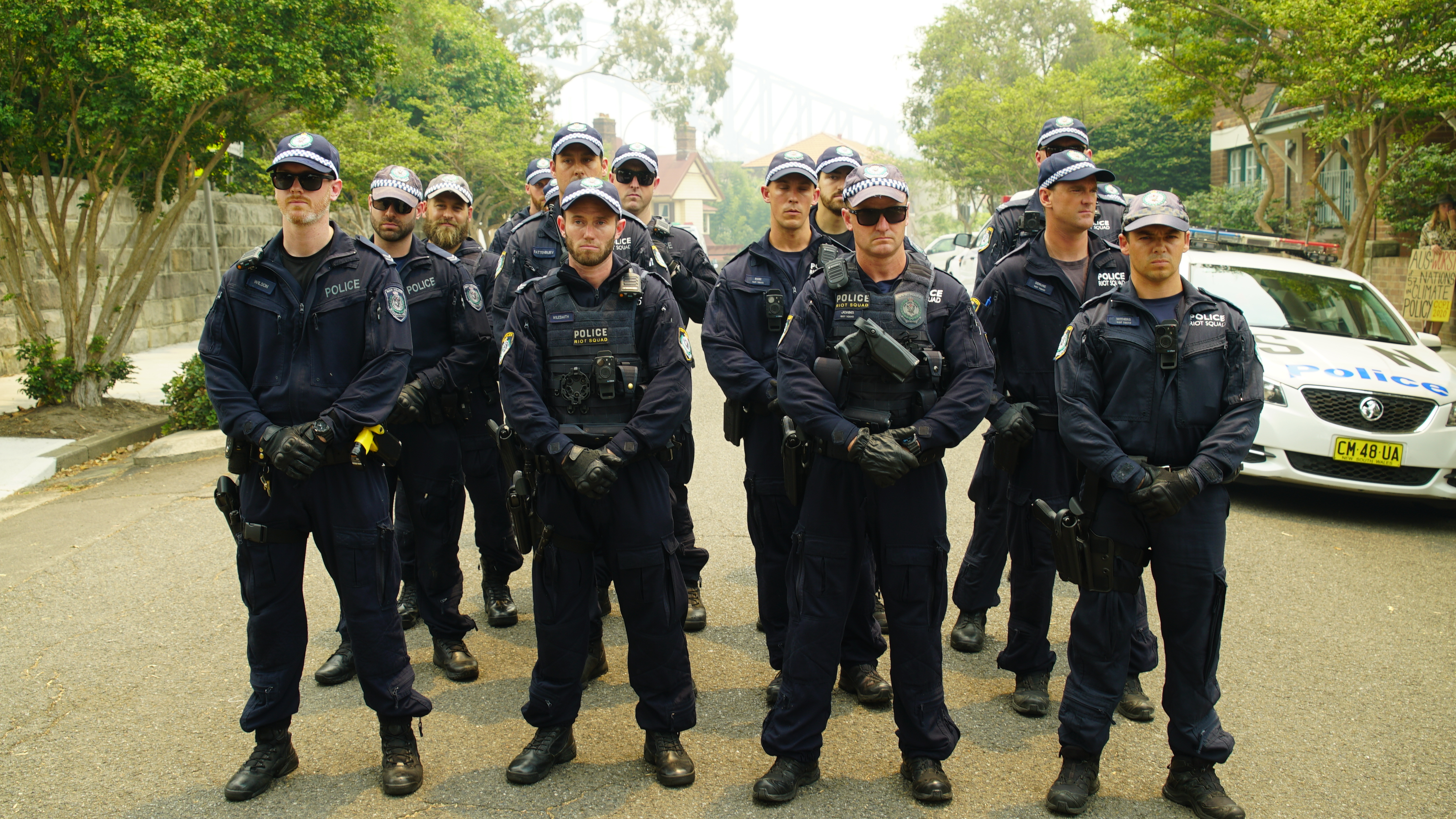
A group of Public Order & Riot Squad Officers at a protest

The Public Order and Riot Squad specialise in:

- riot control and response
- search warrants
- searches for missing persons
- crowd control
- IED search
- response to major chemical biological and radiological (CBR) incidents and
- assisting general duties Police whenever a rapid co-ordinated response is needed at incidents such as brawls or street parties.

PORS role includes attending major public protests and demonstrations, assisting with searches for evidence, people, property and drugs and canvassing witnesses during large-scale investigations. The unit also clears cells, transfers inmates and performs other security duties during industrial disputes at the State's prisons.

PORS provide core officers for Operation Vikings. Operation Vikings was designed to provide a highly visible police presence across New South Wales. Large numbers of Police are deployed to these operations, targeting antisocial behaviour, alcohol-related crime, street level drug possession and traffic offences in known trouble (or "hot") spots.

The PORS often deploy large numbers of vehicles and officers to A-League football matches held in New South Wales.

== See also ==
- Operations Support Group
- State Protection Group
- Public Order Response Team (Victoria)
- Riot control
- Riot police
