= Ecojet (British airline) =

Proposed British regional airline

Ecojet Airlines
IATA	ICAO	Call sign
ZC	—	—
- Founded: 27 August 2021 (as Fresh Airlines Limited)
- Ceased operations: 2026
- Operating bases: Edinburgh Airport
- Parent company: Ecotricity
- Headquarters: Edinburgh, Scotland
- Key people: Brent Smith
- Founder: Dale Vince
- Website: https://www.ecojetair.com/

Ecojet Airlines Limited, styled as ecojet, was a proposed British regional airline based at Edinburgh Airport, Scotland. It originally aimed to commence operations in 2024 with flights to and from Edinburgh Airport.

On 14 January 2026, provisional liquidators were appointed following a winding-up order against the company. Joint liquidators were subsequently appointed in May 2026.

== History ==
=== Founding ===
On 17 July 2023, reports emerged that Dale Vince, the founder of Ecotricity and a prominent climate change activist, had formed a new company by the name of Ecojet, which planned to become the world's first electric airline using a fleet of aircraft powered by renewable energy. The airline had appointed Brent Smith, a former Flybe pilot and the founder of Q400 specialist Altsel Aviation, as its Chief Executive alongside Peter Davies, the former Chief Executive of companies including Brussels Airlines, Air Malta, and Air Southwest, who is also the founder and CEO of Airline Management Group, as its chairman.

Ecojet Airlines Limited was founded on 27 August 2021 as Fresh Airlines Limited, and this name was changed on 2 May 2023 following Dale Vince's appointment as a director.

On 26 January 2024, Ecojet began hiring for crew based in Edinburgh, to operate a fleet of ATR 72 airliners. The same month, the airline made a CAMO application to the UK's Civil Aviation Authority.

On 23 September 2024, the airline announced that its operations are now slated to begin in early 2025, with CEO Brent Smith saying that, "It's taking time because we want to get it right from the very outset." At the time, the airline expected details of its IATA designator codes and callsign to be confirmed shortly.

In October 2024, Ecotricity took over Vince's shareholding in Ecojet.

On 13 November 2024, Ecojet appointed Wyvern Partners as its financial advisor in order to lead a £20 million fundraising effort in order to satisfy CAA capital requirements for the AOC application process.

=== Launch of operations ===
In January 2025, the airline published its website in preparation for an operational launch during the IATA 2025 summer season. This launch did not happen.

=== Redundancies and fundraising difficulties ===
In January 2025, Ecojet made 11 of its 13 employees redundant amid delays to its AOC fundraising process.

A spokesperson for the airline told the Daily Telegraph that it had further delayed its launch until 2026 owing to a 'tough investment market', saying that the redundancies were in order to 'reduce overheads to a minimum'.

=== Management team ===
On 9 December 2023, it was reported that Ecojet had made further appointments to its management team. These appointments included Brent Smith as its chief executive officer, Deon van Rensburg as its head of finance, Ben Leon as its chief commercial officer and Augusto Ponte as an advisor to the board of directors.

On 8 March 2024, Ecojet confirmed the appointment of Rebecca Borresen as its chief operating officer, though she would later resign in favour of a position at Loganair.

=== Proposed operations ===
The airline said that it hoped to eliminate single-use plastics from its services, and that it would also serve plant-based meals and provide crew with sustainable uniforms. Whilst initially it was to use traditional kerosene-fuelled aircraft, it planned to shift to electric aircraft once it had begun operations and received its operating licences and airport slots. Alongside fixed-wing operations, it also planned to utilise a fleet of eVTOL aircraft on intercity routes.

=== Brand imaging ===
The airline's livery was based on a stylised rendition of the flag of the United Kingdom. As such, its aircraft were to carry the tagline "Flag Carrier for Green Britain", with this also being a reference to the Green Britain Group, a company founded by Dale Vince which has shareholdings in ventures such as Ecotricity. The airline's slogan was "Another way."

In January 2025 the airline began using "Same altitude, new attitude" as a secondary slogan.

== Liquidation ==
On 14 January 2026, Paul Dounis and Mark Harper from Opus Restructuring & Insolvency were appointed as provisional liquidators of Ecojet Airlines Limited.

In a statement to industry outlet FlightGlobal, Dale Vince said that "It's taking longer than we hoped to get the technology and regulatory pieces of the puzzle in alignment, and so we're pausing work at this time."

In May 2026, Dounis and Harper became joint liquidators of Ecojet following the conclusion of their earlier appointment as provisional liquidators.

== Fleet ==
Dale Vince originally claimed that Ecojet was to launch with the 19-seat Twin Otter aircraft before upscaling to a 70-seat airliner 18 months thereafter. However, in January 2024, the company began hiring for ATR 72 crew to begin operations before mid-2024, with this later being pushed back to 2025.

On 29 November 2023, Ecojet signed an agreement to acquire 70 hydrogen-electric powerplants from ZeroAvia, on lease from MONTE.

On 25 July 2024, Ecojet announced that it had signed a Letter of Intent (LoI) to acquire up to 50 Linx P9 aircraft from ARC Aerosystems. The following day, ZeroAvia announced a further agreement with Ecojet for the purchase of 22 ZA2000 engines.

In November 2024 the airline announced that it had acquired "its first two ATR 72-600 aircraft." When the airline entered provisional liquidation in January 2026, these aircraft had still not been delivered.
