= Gridserve =

British energy infrastructure company

- Company type: Private limited company
- Industry: Sustainable energy
- Founded: 22 September 2017; 8 years ago
- Headquarters: Iver, Buckinghamshire, England
- Key people: Roy Williamson (Board Chairman)
- Net income: −388,441 pound sterling (2019)
- Number of employees: 93 (sep 2024)
- Website: www.gridserve.com

Gridserve Sustainable Energy Limited, stylised as GRIDSERVE, is a British company founded in 2017 to develop, own and operate critical infrastructure for sustainable energy production. Gridserve opened the UK's first all-electric car charging forecourt in 2020, with the second opening in April 2022 and plans to introduce several more in the coming years to charge electric vehicles with 100% renewable energy, supporting the UK's transition to carbon neutrality. The company capitalises its name.

== Activities ==
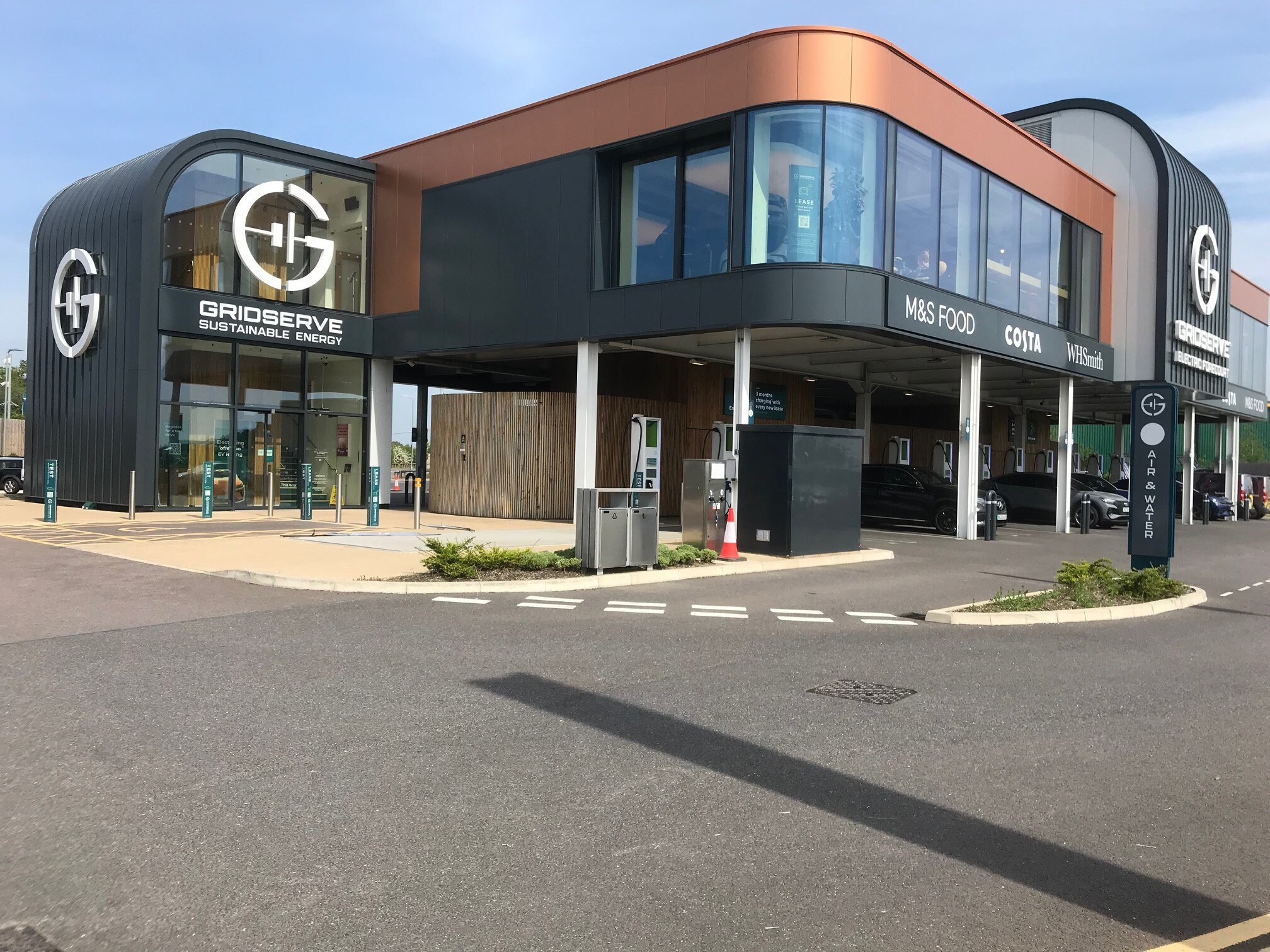
Charging station, Norwich

Gridserve has business activities across three key sectors: solar energy, electric vehicle charging and electric vehicle leasing. Together, these make up the company's Sun-to-Wheel ecosystem.

The company owns and operates photovoltaic power stations, also known as hybrid solar farms, supplying renewable electricity to the National Grid. Onsite batteries allow more efficient energy storage and release. Some of the solar modules are bifacial, allowing them to harvest energy from both sides of the panel. As of 2023 Gridserve has installed over 240,000 bifacial solar panels generating 62GWh of solar energy annually. This includes a site at Clay Hill in Bedfordshire - one of the UK's first subsidy-free solar farms - and sites in Hull and York totalling 60.4MW generating power for Warrington Borough Council.

In addition, Gridserve installs and operates a network of electric charging hubs, with over 540 chargers in 165 locations claiming to add 10 million miles worth of electric vehicle charge (as of December 2022). Operating large multiple-charger 'Electric Super Hubs' in motorway service locations, Gridserve has 142 'High Power' chargers delivering up to 350 kW of EV charging power as well as two of its own electric forecourt sites in Braintree and Norwich with 35 High Power chargers between them. Gridserve has agreed a partnership with Paua, who provide electric vehicle charge cards, for access to their charging sites.

Through Gridserve Car Leasing, the company acts as a vendor and comparison site for the leasing of electric vehicles, with 100 trees planted for every car leased. Leased EV customers have the full cost of charging at Gridserve locations for three months covered.

In August 2024, Gridserve's founder Toddington Harper announced plans to expand the business internationally under the name Gridserve Global. To focus on this, he was succeeded as executive chairman by Roy Williamson.

== Electric forecourts ==
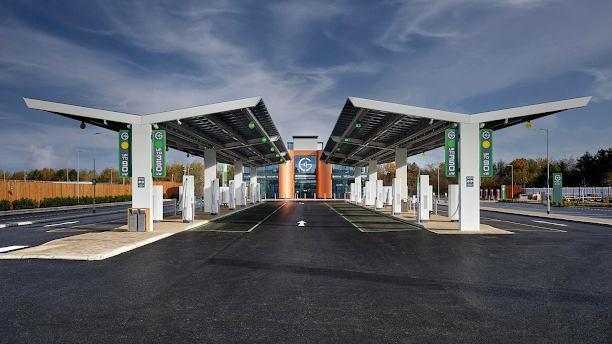
Gridserve's first-opened all-electric charging station in the UK, in Braintree

In advance of the UK mandatory phase-out of fossil fuel vehicles by 2030 and anticipated mass adoption of electric vehicles, Gridserve is developing a countrywide network of customer-focused forecourts that provide ultra-fast electric vehicle charging services and associated retail. Revenue and profitability are designed to derive from electricity grid balancing services and the provision of solar energy generation. However, the company pointedly does not call them service stations; the planned forecourts are intended to serve local communities, like petrol stations do, rather than serving passing trade on motorways. Facilities include convenience stores, office 'pods', exercise bikes to power the site, a children's play area and shower facilities.

Gridserve also offers a test drive programme at its operating forecourts. A fleet of the latest electric cars is offered to potential leasing customers with the option of booking back-to-back test drives of different models online or at the forecourts. The company's 'EV Gurus' offer impartial knowledge and recommendations, and the latest leasing offers are available to select through touchscreen displays.

The first site of the planned network was opened on 7 December 2020 next to the A131 in Great Notley, near Braintree, Essex, receiving national media attention. It is paired with the solar farm at Clay Hill to rapidly charge up to 36 vehicles with 100% renewable electricity. 20 minutes charging with the 350 kW chargers can give a customer up to 200 miles of range. The site also contains a 6 MWh battery - which can store enough energy for 24,000 miles (39,000 km) of EV driving - to balance energy resources, shifting it to move valuable periods to keep prices low. Retailers at the site include WHSmith, Costa Coffee and the Post Office. It was funded by Hitachi Capital UK, Innovate UK and the Office for Zero Emission Vehicles (OZEV).

In October 2022, the Braintree electric forecourt began trialling a new 360 kW High Power charger called the ABB Terra 360. Able to supply up to 62 miles of range in three minutes, the new charger also offers dynamic dual-charging - allowing two cars to plug in and charge simultaneously.

A second electric forecourt with a smaller footprint opened outside Norwich on 21 April 2022. Located in Postwick where the A1270 meets the A47, the site includes 36 chargers with 22 of those 350 kW-capable High Power chargers, as well as rentable office pods, washrooms, a dedicated electric car showroom and retailers such as M&S Food, Costa and WHSmith. One year on from opening the Norwich site has delivered more than two million miles worth of battery charge to EVs.

Further Gridserve electric forecourt due to open include a Gatwick Airport site (located on the Ring Road South Approach to the airport's south terminal), which is scheduled to go live in summer 2023. Sites in Stevenage, Gateshead and Uckfield are due to be built, with planning permission also granted for forecourts in Bromborough, Plymouth and Markham Vale Business Park in Chesterfield. Expansion into Scotland is planned with a proposal for a new forecourt in Rutherglen, a town in South Lanarkshire outside Glasgow City Centre.

== Electric Highway ==
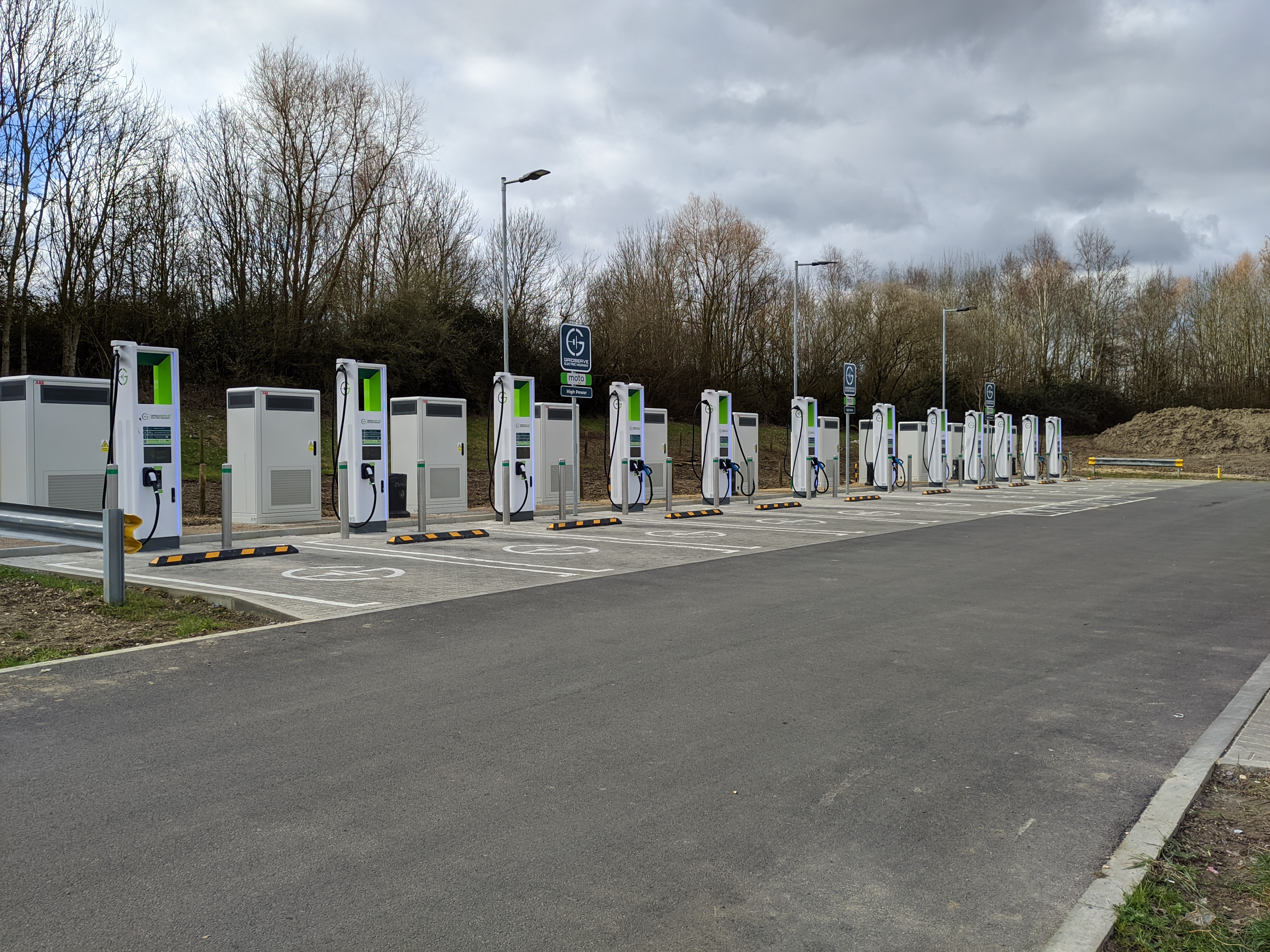
Electric Super Hub at Reading Westbound

In July 2021, it was announced that Gridserve had purchased Ecotricity's charging network "the Electric Highway" which has chargers at almost all UK motorway services. In the first phase, all Electric Highway sites were replaced with more modern devices and contactless payment. This was targeted for September 2021. In fact, most sites except for Welcome Break were upgraded by late 2021; the Welcome Break sites were delayed but completed by April 2022.

In the next phase, Gridserve added "Electric Super Hubs" with 6 to 12 High Power chargers (up to 350 kW) at many service areas operated by Moto. The first hub (Rugby) was built in 2021, and by May 2022 hubs were operating in Swansea, Exeter, Burton-in-Kendal and Thurrock.

As of May 2023, Gridserve operates Electric Super Hubs in 18 service area locations operated by Moto, including sites at Heston, Reading, Wetherby, Woolley Edge and Washington services. The total Electric Highway network comprises 160 locations, with chargers powered by 100% net zero carbon energy from Gridserve's hybrid solar and battery farms. All chargers accept contactless payment and feature CCS and CHAdeMO connectors.
