= Ecotricity =

British green energy company

- Type: Limited company
- Industry: Energy
- Founded: 1 April 1996
- Headquarters: Stroud, Gloucestershire, England
- Area served: United Kingdom
- Key people: Dale Vince, founder
- Products: Wind energy projects; Solar energy projects; Biogas
- Revenue: ▲£193,340,000 (2019)
- Net income: ▼ (£1,267,000) (2019)
- Owner: Green Britain Group
- Website: www.ecotricity.co.uk

Ecotricity is a British energy company based in Stroud, Gloucestershire, specialising in selling green energy to consumers that it primarily generates from its 87.2-megawatt wind power portfolio. It is built on the principle of heavily reinvesting its profit in building more of its own green energy generation.

The company was founded in 1995 by Dale Vince, who remains in control. As of 2025 the company has around 167,000 meter points on supply, comprising domestic and business customers. Ecotricity's initiatives included the creation of one of Britain's first electric vehicle charging networks, which was sold to Gridserve in 2021.

== History ==
Ecotricity was started by Dale Vince in 1995 as Renewable Energy Company Limited, with a single wind turbine he had used to power an old army truck in which he lived on a hill near Stroud.

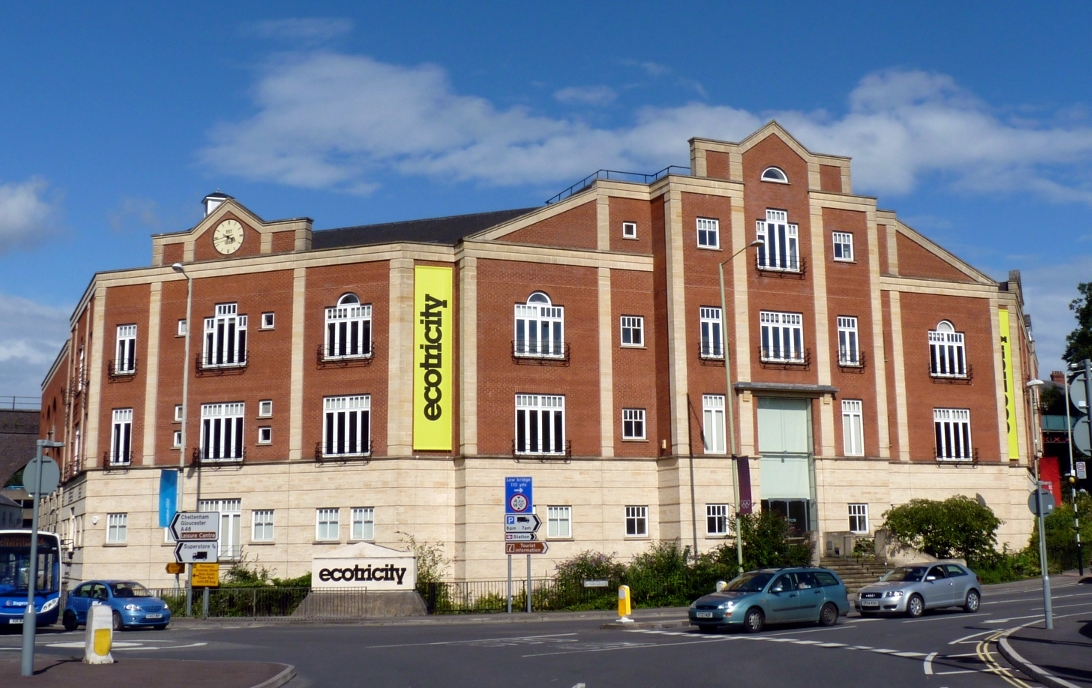
Ecotricity building in Rowcroft, Stroud, one of its three bases in the town

Vince later went on to build commercial wind-monitoring equipment, which the company still makes today, using the name Nexgen. Ecotricity started generation with a 40-metre turbine in 1996, which at the time was the largest in the country.

In 2007, Vince ran an advertisement on the back page of The Guardian newspaper inviting Richard Branson to his house to discuss solutions to climate change over a carbon-free breakfast. The ad ran the day after Branson appeared on TV with American former vice president Al Gore, who had managed to persuade Branson that climate change was an issue. The ad included Vince's personal mobile phone number.

Ecotricity was a winner in the 2007 Ashden Awards for sustainable energy. The awards congratulated Ecotricity for its environmental contribution, saying: "The company's turbines are delivering 46 GW·h/yr of renewable electricity and avoiding around 46,000 tonnes of CO_{2} emissions a year. The installed capacity is expected to double by the end of 2007."

In July 2009, Ecotricity started legal proceedings against French power company EDF Energy for the alleged misuse of the green Union Flag logo, used to promote EDF's Team Green Britain campaign. Ecotricity had previously used a green Union flag in its own advertising and claimed confused customers had contacted it to ask why Ecotricity was co-operating with EDF.

In January 2012, it was announced that Ecotricity has invested in the development of Searaser pump-to-shore wave energy machines, and in June said they were to be deployed in the autumn of that year. In October 2014, Ecotricity and marine consultants DNV GL were moving from laboratory trials to sea trials.

In 2013, Ecotricity's electricity supply became 100% renewable, rather than a mix.

In October 2014, it was announced that Ecotricity had partnered with Skanska to build and finance new turbines, which added a further 100 MW to its existing 70 MW capacity, The following month, the company decided not to attempt new planning applications in England because of the political climate, instead concentrating on Scotland. It went on to spin its small turbine manufacturer out into a subsidiary called Britwind, which, in collaboration with a local company, offered free electricity to crofters in return for installing a small turbine, keeping any excess power generated.

In March 2015, Ecotricity announced it had refinanced its existing wind farms with the aim of using the extra capital to expand production to 100 megawatts by November 2016.

In 2016, Ecotricity had approximately a 25% shareholding stake in competitor Good Energy, which has been sustained to 2020.

In the 2017/2018 financial year the company had a turnover of £176 million, with a gross profit of £55 million and a loss on ordinary activities before tax of £4.9 million, but after charges and revaluation of investments had a "Total comprehensive (loss) for the year" of £9.5 million. It gave £416,000 to charity.

In 2018, the UK government used a green union flag for a promotion, which lead Vince to file a lawsuit for copyright infringement due to the similarities to the logo of Ecotricity. The case was settled in 2020 and the government agreed to not use the flag again.

By 2019, the company had 200,000 customers. A corporate restructure in 2020 created Green Britain Group Limited; the company's directors are Dale Vince and Kate Vince, and its subsidiaries include Ecotricity Limited and Forest Green Rovers Football Club Limited.

In January 2021 the company agreed to buy 3 Megawatt-hours yearly from United Downs Deep Geothermal Power, the UK's first geothermal plant. In summer 2021, Ecotricity made a bid to take over Good Energy, where it already owned 27% of the shares, which was rejected.

In April 2022, Dale Vince stated an intention to sell the company. It was reported that the company planned to build a further 2,500 MW of renewable energy generation, which would require investment of some £2 billion.

In May 2023, Asif Rehmanwala was appointed as the CEO of Ecotricity and the Green Britain Group.

In December 2023, Ecotricity donated £1 million to the UK Labour Party.

In October 2024, Ecotricity Group Limited took a controlling stake in regional airline Ecojet which was previously held by Dale Vince.

In July 2025, Ecotricity had around 167,000 customers.

== Generation ==
Before August 2013, Ecotricity ran a mix of fuels. Ecotricity's proportion of renewable energy rose from 24.1% in 2007 to 51.1% in 2011 (compared with a national average of 7.9%), with plans for a further increase to 60% by 2012.

In the past, a substantial proportion of the electricity (25.9% in 2007) sold by Ecotricity to customers came from nuclear sources. This proportion had decreased to 16% by 2010, and 2.6% by 2011. Ecotricity also provided a 100% renewable energy tariff called New Energy Plus, in which renewable energy was bought in from other suppliers to top up renewable energy produced by Ecotricity.

=== Wind ===
At Conisholme in Lincolnshire on 8 January 2009, two of the blades of one of the company's turbines were damaged. In February 2013 the go-ahead was given for Ecotricity to build its largest windfarm, a 66 megawatt, 22 turbine farm at Heckington Fen in Lincolnshire. In February 2013, Ecotricity revealed a prototype 6 kW vertical axis wind turbine called the "urbine". In October 2018, Ecotricity began operations at the Alveston wind farm in South Gloucestershire. In May 2022, a partnership with ABB was announced for the installation of a grid scale battery energy storage system at the wind farm.

=== Solar ===
Ecotricity also produces solar energy, with its first "sun park" opening in 2011. In April 2016 it bought SunEdison's UK business supplying domestic solar panels.

=== Gas ===
In May 2010, Ecotricity became the first UK company to supply eco-friendly gas, produced in the Netherlands by anaerobic digestion of sugar beet waste. In 2015, the company was planning to have its own digesters fed by locally sourced grass from marginal land of grade 3 or poorer by 2017. The first of these would have produced 78.8GWh a year from 75,000t of grass and forage rye silage.

In August 2015, Ecotricity announced plans to build an anaerobic digester at Sparsholt College in Hampshire that would take grass cuttings from local farms and supply the resulting six megawatts of gas to the grid with the overall aim of training students in the technology. This joined the first announced in Gloucestershire in April and was followed by a third three megawatt plant announced in August in Somerset.

On 25 April 2016, planning permission for the site at Sparsholt College was refused. In July 2016, a new application was made to build the facility at the college site, which was approved in October 2016. The new proposal included "[...] new and revised traffic data and assessment, new traffic plans to keep vehicle movements away from Sparsholt village and a commitment to protect local road infrastructure.". Also, "[Ecotricity] consulted representatives of the nearby parish councils and incorporated their requests, wherever possible into the routing plans and operational controls."

By the start of 2019, the company had not built any biogas plants but still intended to do so.

=== Microtricity feed-in tariff ===
Ecotricity offers the Feed-in Tariff as a voluntary licensee under the name "Microtricity", offering payments to people who generate and export electricity from low-carbon sources such as solar panels.

As of October 2024, Ecotricity does not offer a Smart Export Guarantee tariff to small low-carbon generators such as domestic solar panel systems.

== Side projects ==
=== Greenbird ===
Ecotricity is the sponsor of the Ecotricity Greenbird, a land yacht that set a new world land speed record for wind-powered vehicles on 26 March 2009 on the dry Lake Ivanpah.

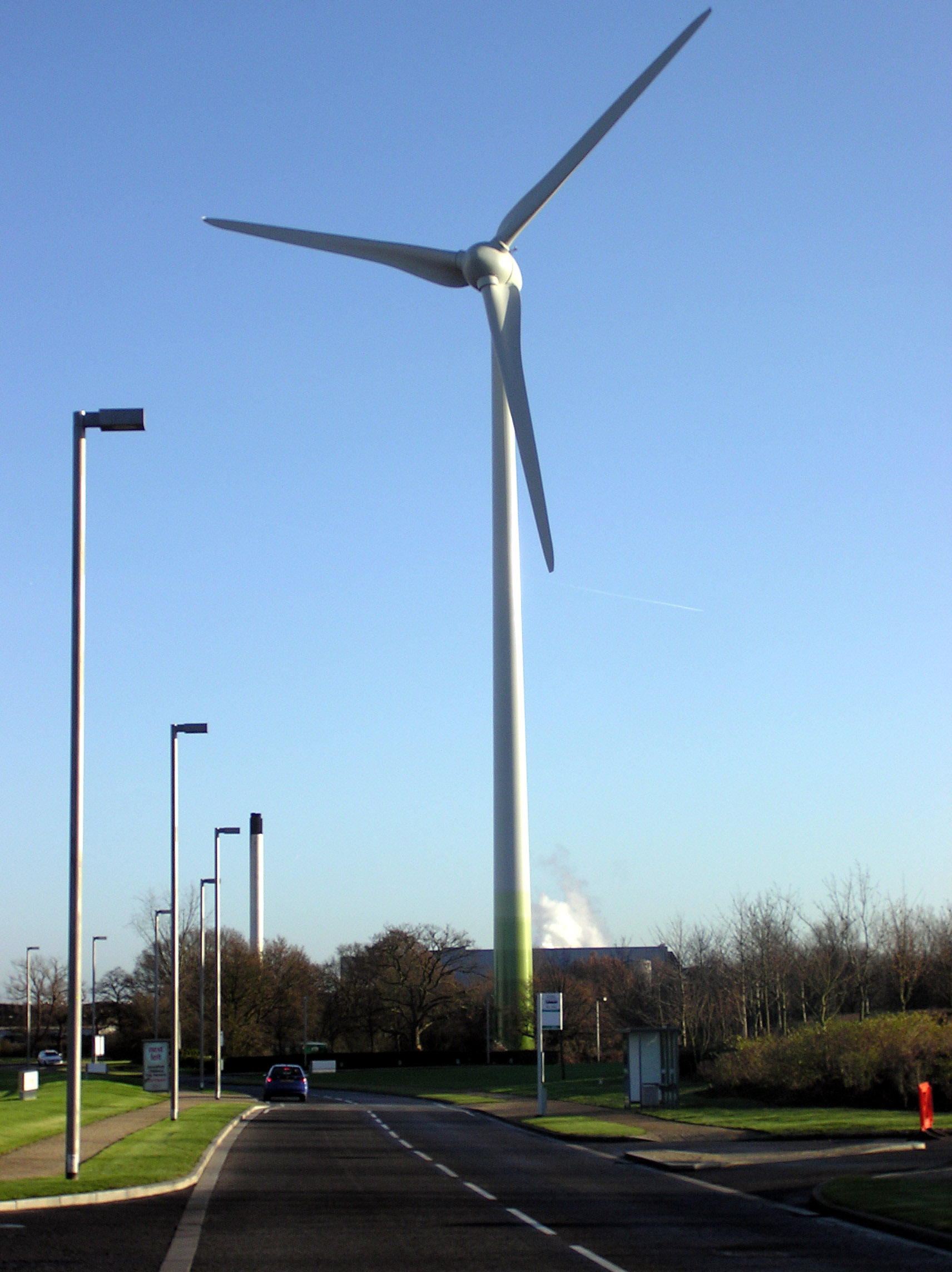
An Ecotricity wind turbine at Green Park Business Park, Reading, England

=== Nemesis ===
Ecotricity has built an electric sports car called Nemesis that was built as a demonstration of what electric cars are capable of: an endurance trip from Land's End to John o' Groats is planned recharging only from electricity produced by wind power. In September 2012 the car broke the UK electric land speed record reaching an average speed of 151 miles per hour (243 km/h).

=== Vehicle recharging (2011 to 2021) ===
In July 2011, Ecotricity launched a free electric vehicle charging network, sited around the country at 14 of the Welcome Break Motorway service areas, linking London in the south with Exeter in the west and Edinburgh in the north. The charging points were initially equipped with both a UK-standard 13-amp domestic socket and an IEC 62196 32-amp 3-phase socket. There were plans for charging points at RoadChef sites also.

In October 2012, the company started to add 50 kW CHAdeMO fast charging stations, allowing compatible cars to recharge within 30 minutes. In April 2014, it was announced that support for Combined Charging System connectors would be added, and by September Ecotricity had over 120 chargers, branded as the Electric Highway. In May 2014, Ecotricity brought an interim High Court injunction against electric car manufacturer Tesla over its vehicle charging network; this was resolved in an out of court settlement.

In 2014, the Ecotricity vehicle charging network had sporadic software issues after the addition of a new connector which left some chargers not working or not connecting to specific cars.

In December 2014, the network covered 90% of the UK's motorway service stations, with sites also at Land's End and John o' Groats. By December 2015, it had 6,500 members using it once a week or more, and the network, which had hitherto been free to use, began to require payment. From 11 July 2016, a 20-minute fast-charge cost £5, later changed to £6 for 30 minutes, but charges remained free for customers of Ecotricity. Following feedback from users, a balance between the needs of EV drivers and PHEV drivers led to a £3 connection fee, waived for Ecotricity customers, and 17p per KWh.

In 2018, the Ecotricity EV tariff on its motorway network was 30p/KWh for non-Ecotricity customers and half this for customers. Access was via a mobile phone app. To help with using this, some of the charging points were fitted with short-range, restricted, WiFi to enable connection in poor mobile signal areas. By the start of 2019, Ecotricity had over 300 charging points.

In early 2021, Ecotricity and GRIDSERVE announced a partnership which would see the network expanded and contactless payment facilities added. Funding for the programme came from Hitachi Capital (UK), also a shareholder in GRIDSERVE. In mid-2021, it was announced that GRIDSERVE had purchased the remaining stake from Ecotricity, taking full ownership of the charging network.

=== Distributed energy storage ===
Around 2014, Ecotricity investigated supplying 100 houses with an internet-connected grid energy storage system that will take the homes off the grid at peak times.

=== Mobile phone network ===
Ecotricity launched a mobile virtual network called Ecotalk in 2018; plans had been discussed by Vince in 2013. Money from customer's bills would be used to buy land for nature conservation, in part through a partnership with the RSPB.

=== Small turbine manufacture ===
In May 2014, Ecotricity rescued Evance, a manufacturer of small (5 kW) wind turbines, from administration, saving the company's 29 jobs. Branded "Brit Wind", in January 2017 they announced £1 million of sales to Japan as well as sales to France, Norway, Denmark, the US and Belgium.

=== Political donations ===
The company has donated to several political parties that support subsidies for renewable energy. In November 2013 it donated £20,000 to the Green Party. In February 2015, Ecotricity announced that it would be donating £250,000 to the electoral fighting fund of the Labour Party. This decision alienated some of its customers, in particular supporters of the Green Party, as they felt some Labour policies were at odds with Ecotricity's avowed green ethical stance.

Ecotricity had already donated £120,000 to Labour in November 2014, including £20,000 to the local group in Stroud which was trying (unsuccessfully) to unseat Neil Carmichael, an opponent of wind farms in Gloucestershire. In the six months before the 2015 general election Ecotricity donated a total of £380,000 to Labour. The day after the election of 7 May 2015 the company donated £50,000 to the Liberal Democrats, including £20,000 to the group in the Kingston upon Thames constituency which had been lost by Ed Davey, the pro-renewables Secretary of State for Energy and Climate Change.

Ecotricity donated £20,000 to Keir Starmer's 2020 Labour Party leadership election campaign.

=== Grid-level storage ===
At the end of 2017, Ecotricity was granted planning permission to build one of the UK's first grid-scale battery storage projects on its Alveston site in South Gloucestershire. The 10 megawatt project was intended to share the grid connection with the three new wind turbines there, providing the company with peak-shaving capacity.

==== Virtual power plant ====
In May 2018 it was announced that Ecotricity would start building a virtual power plant to more efficiently use and manage electricity usage.

=== Diamonds ===
In October 2020, Vince announced the company would make lab grown diamonds using carbon dioxide captured from the air, water and power from their own green supply.

=== Zero-emissions airline ===
In July 2023, Dale Vince announced the launch of Ecojet, a zero-emissions airline based in Edinburgh.

On 14 January 2026, and following several years of delays, Paul Dounis and Mark Harper from Opus Restructuring & Insolvency were appointed as provisional liquidators of Ecojet Airlines Limited. The company had never operated commercial flights.

== See also ==
- Green electricity in the United Kingdom
- Wind power in the United Kingdom
- Energy policy of the United Kingdom
- Energy in the United Kingdom
