= Agricultural Land Classification =

The Agricultural Land Classification system forms part of the planning system in England and Wales. It classifies agricultural land in five categories according to versatility and suitability for growing crops.

== Grades ==
- Grade 1, 2 and 3a, are referred to as 'Best and Most Versatile' land, and enjoy significant protection from development.
- Grade 4 and 5 are described as poor quality agricultural land and very poor quality agricultural land

== Wales ==
In November 2017, the Welsh Government launched the Predictive Agricultural Land Classification Map.

This is the first update since the 1970s and replaces the Provisional Agricultural Land Classification Map for Wales. Importantly it distinguishes between ALC Sub-grades 3a and 3b.

The Welsh Government is undertaking the first update to the Predictive Agricultural Land Classification Map between 2018 and 2020.

Frequently Asked Questions describes how the quality of farm land is graded and what this grade means for landowners.
