= Geothermal power in the United Kingdom =

The United Kingdom generates a small amount of geothermal power and uses a little geothermal heat.

The potential for exploiting geothermal energy in the United Kingdom on a commercial basis was initially examined by the Department of Energy in the wake of the 1973 oil crisis. Several regions of the country were identified, but interest in developing them was lost as petroleum prices fell. Although the UK is not actively volcanic, a large heat resource is potentially available via shallow geothermal ground source heat pumps, shallow aquifers and deep saline aquifers in the mesozoic basins of the UK. Geothermal energy is plentiful beneath the UK, although it is not readily accessible currently except in specific locations.

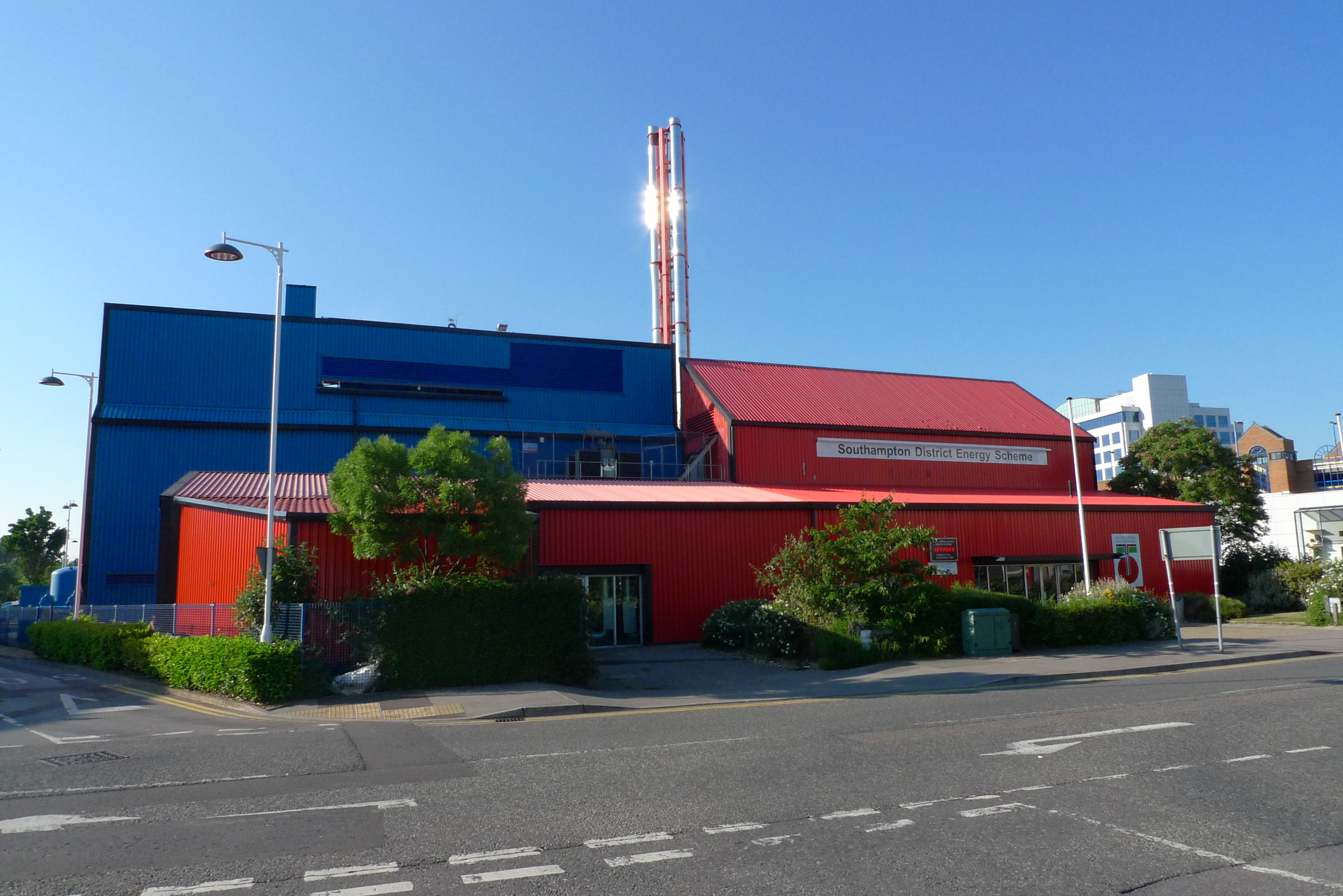
Southampton District Energy Scheme

== History ==
Ancient legend credited the early Celtic kings with the discovery of the thermal springs at the Roman Baths in Aquae Sulis (modern city of Bath) which then fell into disrepair during the Dark Ages and were not rediscovered until the 18th century, along with the springs at Buxton in the Peak District.

The geothermal potential of the UK was investigated by a program funded by the UK government and the European Commission that ran from 1977 until 1994, and saw a Hot Dry Rock experiment drilled in Carnmenellis granite of Cornwall. The project, which was never intended to produce electricity, was a rock mechanics experiment to research the hydraulic stimulation of fracture networks at temperatures below 100 °C (212 °F). Three wells were drilled to a total vertical depth of 2.6 km (1.6 miles) where the bottom-hole temperature was around 100 °C. In 1994, the Hot Dry Rock project was closed, and research effort was transferred to the European Geothermal Project at Soultz-sous-Forêts.

Geothermal energy development in the UK has been limited, partly due to the lack of high enthalpy resources, but also due to the availability of cheap fossil fuels. However, when comparisons are made to countries in a similar tectonic setting, it is clear that the UK is underutilising this potential resource. The lack of geothermal development has largely been a result of the availability of North Sea natural gas during the 1980s and 1990s.

Interest in the geothermal energy resources of the UK rose again in the 2000s, as a potential way of addressing some of the UK's "energy gap"

== Solar (shallow geothermal) energy ==
There is what may be mistakenly known as geothermal energy at shallow depths but it is technically solar energy; the upper 10 to 15 m (33 to 49 ft) of ground is heated by solar radiation and not (except in rare exceptions) geothermal energy. This acts a heat store and can be exploited in a number of different ways. This heat can be utilised by ground source heat pumps that can substantially reduce heating bills and reduce the associated carbon footprint. The heat from the sun is conducted downwards into the ground. At a depth of about 15 m, ground temperatures are not influenced by seasonal air temperature changes and tend to remain stable all year around at about the mean annual air temperature (9 to 13 °C (48 to 55 °F) in the UK). Hence, the ground at this depth is cooler than the air in summer and warmer than the air in winter. This temperature difference is exploited by ground source heat pumps that are used for heating and/or cooling of homes and office buildings.

== Aquifer-based schemes ==
Groundwater in Permo-Triassic sandstones in the UK has the potential to provide an exploitable geothermal resource at depths of between 1 and 3 km (0.62 and 1.86 miles). Since 1979 the basins of principal interest are East Yorkshire and Lincolnshire, Wessex, Worcester, Cheshire, West Lancashire, Carlisle, and basins in Northern Ireland. In addition, some of these basins are in areas of elevated heat flow, or are overlain by less thermally conductive strata, providing in effect an insulating layer. The following table lists the primary UK Geothermal aquifer resources for areas where the temperature is greater than 40 °C and the transmissivity is greater than 10 Dm, except as indicated:

Aquifer/Basin name	Geologiocal Formation	Geothermal resource (Exa-joules)	Identified resource^{(1)} (Exa-joules)	Depth (m)
East Yorkshire and Lincolnshire	Sherwood Sandstone	99	6.7	?
East Yorkshire and Lincolnshire	Basal Permian Sands	6.7	0.9^{(2)}	?
Wessex	Sherwood Sandstone	22.9	3.2^{(3)}	1,700 to 2,200
Worcester	Permo-Triassic (undifferentiated)	12	1.4	2,500
Cheshire	Sherwood Sandstone	16.9	2.1	4,000
Cheshire	Permian, including some Triassic	27.9	3.8	4,000
Northern Ireland	Sherwood Sandstone	35.4	4.7	?
^{(1)} Identified resource calculated assuming an end of process heat rejection temperature of 30 °C; direct use of the fluid, and re-injection of the fluid after use.^{(2)} Transmissivity ≥5 Dm^{(3)} In part of area transmissivity 5 to 10 Dm; Note: 1 exa-joule=10^{18}joules

=== Southampton District Heating Scheme ===
In the 1980s, the United Kingdom Department of Energy undertook a research and development programme to examine the potential of geothermal aquifers in the UK. However, after some initial success drilling a well in the Wessex Basin in 1981, it was deemed too small to be commercially viable. The project was abandoned by the Department of Energy, but Southampton City Council refused to let the project fall and took the decision to create the UK's first geothermal power scheme. This was undertaken as part of a plan to become a 'self-sustaining city' in energy generation, promoted by then leader of the city council Alan Whitehead. The scheme was eventually developed in conjunction with French-owned company COFELY District Energy and the Southampton Geothermal Heating Company was then established. Construction started in 1987 on a well to draw water from the Wessex Basin aquifer at a depth of 1,800 m (5,900 ft) and a temperature of 76 °C (169 °F).

The scheme now heats a number of buildings in the city centre, including the Southampton Civic Centre, the WestQuay shopping centre, Royal South Hants Hospital, Solent University and the Carnival offices; and is part of an enlarged city centre district heating system that includes other combined heating, cooling and power sources. As of 2011 the district heating and cooling scheme provides annually 26 °CGWh of electricity and over 40 °CGWh of heat. Brine from the geothermal well provided 18% of the total district heating mix, with fuel oil (10%) and natural gas (70%) making up the rest. The electricity generated from the scheme is used by Associated British Ports via a private electrical connection to the Port of Southampton, with any surplus electricity sold back to the grid.

=== Stoke-on-Trent ===
In 2014, Stoke-on-Trent City Council announced plans for a £52 million project to create a district heating network powered by geothermal energy. This will provide heating, in the form of hot water, to local customers. As of 2024, the heating network had finished building, but the geothermal project was yet to start. Planning permission was requested for the third time in 2024, after develop Star Energy had let previous permission expire twice.

=== Other ===
Another area with great potential for geothermal energy is in the North Sea, on the continental shelf where the Earth's crust is thin (less than 10 km [6.2 miles]). The offshore platforms extract hydrocarbons from this region, but each year the output falls by 5% and soon it will be uneconomic to continue using these platforms for fossil fuel extraction. An alternate use could be geothermal power generation. A 1986 work on this was undertaken by Total Energy Conservation and Management Co. Ltd. An overview document was produced called "Single Borehole Geothermal Energy Extraction System for Electrical Power Generation".

== Hot rock schemes ==
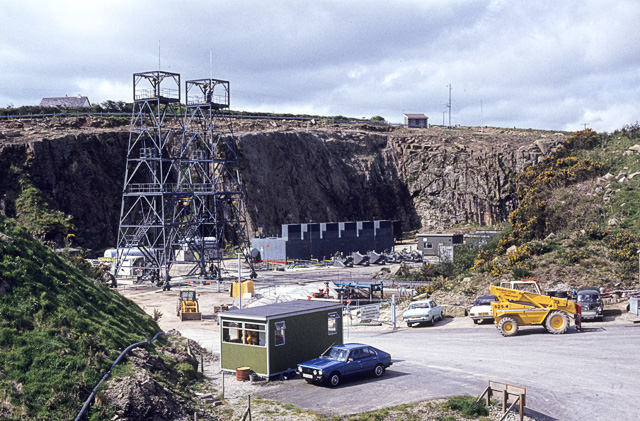
Rosemanowes geothermal energy plant 1983

The average geothermal gradient in the UK is 26 °C, 47 °F per kilometre (42 °C, 76 °F per mile) depth. There is no deep geothermal power generation in the UK. The granite regions of South West England, the Lake District and Weardale and the Eastern Highlands of Scotland are considered most likely to have the best prospects for power generation. In addition to using geothermally heated aquifers, Hot-Dry-Rock geothermal technology can be used to heat water pumped below ground onto geothermally heated rock. Starting in 1977, trials of the technology were undertaken at Rosemanowes Quarry, near Penryn, Cornwall.

Heat-only projects are generally considered to have the greatest potential in the UK because the resource is more widespread and shallower. This includes the hot aquifers (i.e. subterranean bodies of water) in the North East, Wessex, Cheshire, and Northern Ireland. The UK's only existing geothermal heat-generating station (heat only) is at Southampton, where an 1,800 m (5,900 ft) borehole taps into the edge of the aquifer under Wessex and provides heat to the Southampton District Energy Scheme. The borehole is being refurbished.

In 2008, a planning application was submitted for a hot rocks project on the site of a former cement works at Eastgate, near Stanhope in County Durham. The geothermal plant will heat the Eastgate Renewable Energy Village, the UK's first geothermal energy model village. However this was shelved in 2010.

In 2010 planning permission for a commercial-scale geothermal power plant was granted by Cornwall Council. The plant will be constructed on the United Downs industrial estate near Redruth by Geothermal Engineering. The plant will produce 3 MW of renewable electricity. Drilling commenced at the site in November 2018.

In December 2010, the Eden Project in Cornwall was given permission to build a Hot Rock Geothermal Plant. Drilling was planned to start in 2011, but as of May 2018, funding is still being sought. The plant will be on the north side of the Eden Project, a showcase for environmental projects at Bodelva, near St Austell. It should produce 3-4 MW of electricity for use by Eden with a surplus, enough for about 3,500 houses, going into the National Grid.

=== Deep geothermal energy in the UK ===
The Deep Geothermal Challenge Fund of the Department of Energy and Climate Change has provided more than £4.5 million in grants to support the following projects: Power projects

- United Downs near Redruth, Cornwall – £1.475 million in 2009
- Eden Project near St Austell, Cornwall – £2.011 million in 2009

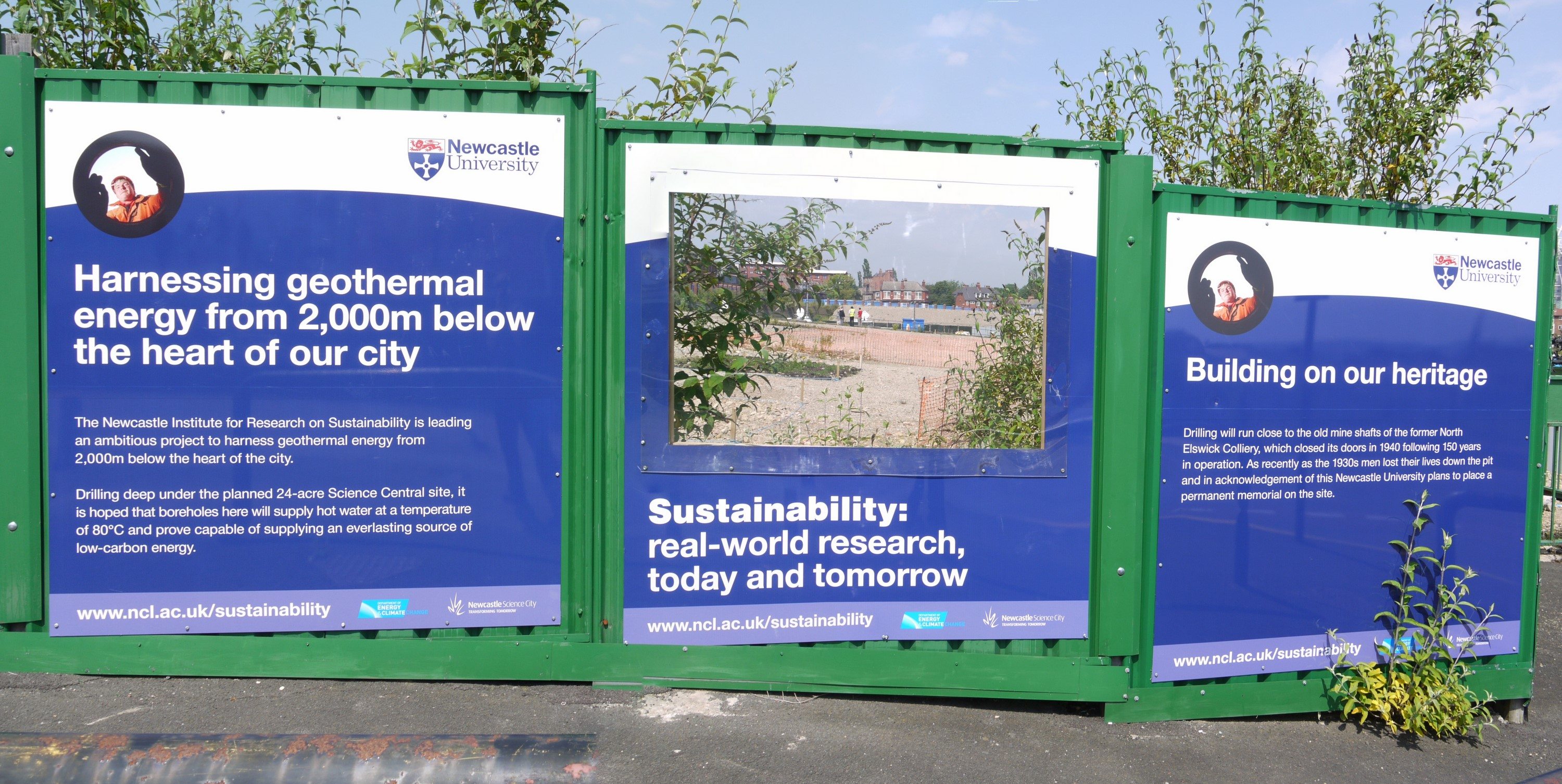
Newcastle Science Central geothermal site

Heat-only projects

- Southampton City Centre – £200,000 in 2010.
- Eastgate in Weardale, County Durham – £461,000 in 2009
- Science Central site, Newcastle City Centre – £400,000 in 2010

==== United Downs ====
In early 2013, the government pulled a multimillion-pound grant from Geothermal Engineering Ltd for the £50 million United Downs Deep Geothermal Power project, after the company failed to secure the necessary additional investment to meet the terms of the grant. By 2016, the company had managed to secure £30 million funding for the project from a combination of the European Regional Development Fund, Cornwall Council and private investors, thus financing the UK's first commercial hot rocks power scheme. In 2019, the company had finished drilling the two geothermal wells; the production well to a depth of 5,275 m (17,306 ft) and the injection well to 2,393 m (7,851 ft). The hot water reaches 250 °C (482 °F), and can yield around 60 MW of heat and 10 MW electrical energy. In 2026, the power plant was turned on.

==== Newcastle University ====
Newcastle University Science Central Borehole Project, at 1,800 m (5,900 ft) is the deepest geothermal well drilled for nearly 30 years. built on the former Tyne Brewery in the city. The temperature profile of 3.9 °C (7.0 °F) per 100 m is higher than that found in Weardale. The project failed as flow rates of hot water from the borehole were not great enough to be exploitable, leaving the development to be heated by conventional sources.

== Potential ==
A report for the Renewable Energy Association prepared by the engineering consultants Sinclair Knight Merz in 2012 identified the following key findings:

- The resource is widely spread around the UK with 'hotspots' in Cornwall, Weardale, Lake District, East Yorkshire, Lincolnshire, Cheshire, Worcester, Dorset, Hampshire, Northern Ireland and Scotland;
- Cost reduction potential is exceptionally high;
- Deep geothermal resources could provide 9.5 GW of baseload renewable electricity – equivalent to nearly nine nuclear power stations – which could generate 20% of the UK's current annual electricity consumption;
- Deep geothermal resources could provide over 100 GW of heat, which could supply sufficient heat to meet the space heating demand in the UK;
- Despite this significant potential, the UK support regime is uncompetitive with other European countries.

=== Memorandum of understanding with the Icelandic Government ===
On 30 May 2012, the UK government signed a Memorandum of Understanding with the Icelandic government on a number of energy issues, including supporting the development of deep geothermal energy in the UK.

- To exchange information on the development of the deep geothermal sector in the UK, including in the supply of heat to district heating networks;
- To explore the possibility of developing electricity interconnection between Iceland and the UK, including relevant legal and regulatory issues.

== See also ==
- Energy use and conservation in the United Kingdom
- Ground source heat pumps
- Earth warming tubes
- Renewable energy
- The Geological Society
- Geothermal (geology)
- Renewable energy in the United Kingdom
- Wind power in the United Kingdom
- Solar power in the United Kingdom
- Hydroelectricity in the United Kingdom
- List of renewable energy topics by country
