= Solar augmented geothermal energy =

Solar-heated artificial underground lake

Solar augmented geothermal energy (SAGE) is an advanced method of geothermal energy that creates a synthetic geothermal storage resource by heating a natural brine with solar energy and adding enough heat when the sun shines to generate power 24 hours a day. The earth is given enough energy in one hour to provide all electrical needs for a year. Available energy is not the issue, but energy storage is the problem and SAGE creates effective storage and electrical power delivery on demand. This technology is especially effective for geothermal wells that have demonstrated inconsistent heat or idle oil or gas fields that have demonstrated the proper geology and have an abundance of solar.

== Technology ==
Thermal injection for oil stimulation was first used in 1907 California in Solar thermal enhanced oil recovery. Heated fluid was used to improve oil production and was one of the first attempts in enhanced oil recovery. Solar energy has been used in enhanced oil recovery as a thermal energy source since 1957 when Atlantic Richfield used it at a California experimental facility. In the 1970s, research on the use of injecting CO_{2}, or Carbon dioxide flooding, into wells for enhanced oil recovery led to better modeling techniques and understandings, especially in the area of the flow a heat injection into production wells. Since the 1970s, the geothermal industry has refined the technology behind solar augmented geothermal wells to perform in a predictable and commercially viable way. This is done by relying on concentrated solar heat to recharge heat extracted from the well.

Geothermal exploration in the United States has been built around finding easily accessible (close to the surface) high-temperature sources of heat. During exploration, it was common for holes to be drilled and abandoned because they were “dry”, or failed to produce consistent heat for a commercially viable electricity generation. In response to these “dry” holes, the geothermal industry began developing Enhanced geothermal systems (EGS). In EGS, a “hot pan” in the earth is located and the heat is amplified by other means. This method allows for wells with insufficient or inconsistent heat to be viable candidates for synthetic geothermal electricity generation.

Solar augmented geothermal uses an apparatus and method to store concentrated solar energy in a subsurface geologic reservoir. The method includes transferring solar thermal energy to a fluid, creating a supercritical fluid. The supercritical fluid is then injected into a subsurface geologic reservoir through an injection well. This method allows a wide array of subsurface geologic reservoirs to become commercially viable for electric production. This includes reservoirs with highly permeable and porous sedimentary stratum, a depleted hydrocarbon field, a depleting hydrocarbon field, a depleted oil field, a depleting oil field, a depleted gas field, or a depleting gas field. Once one of these is charged with a supercritical fluid, the subsurface formation creates a synthetic geothermal reservoir. Any heat added by nature will be taken as a further improvement to the thermal to the electricity conversion process.

== History of Geothermal Energy ==
Geothermal power is power generated by geothermal energy. Existing technologies that are well known include dry steam power stations, flash steam power stations and binary cycle power stations. Geothermal power is a sustainable and renewable source of energy. Because heat is extraction in small amounts compared to the Earth's heat content, the Earth can replenish its heat and continue to provide an abundant source of thermal energy. The greenhouse gas emissions from geothermal energy are on average 45 grams of carbon dioxide per kilowatt-hour of electricity. This is less than 5 percent of the conventional methods of electric production from coal-fired plants.

Geothermal electric energy production is currently used in 26 countries. As a source of renewable energy, geothermal has the potential to meet 3-5% of the global demand for energy by 2050. With economic incentives, it is estimated that by 2100 it will be possible to meet 10% of global demand.

== History of Solar Thermal Energy ==
Solar thermal energy (STE) is a form of energy and a technology for harnessing solar energy to generate thermal energy or electrical energy for use in industry, and in the residential and commercial sectors. Augustin Mouchot demonstrated a solar collector with a cooling engine making ice cream at the 1878 Universal Exhibition in Paris. The first installation of solar thermal energy equipment occurred in the Sahara approximately in 1910 by Frank Shuman when a steam engine was run on steam produced by sunlight. Because liquid fuel engines were developed and found more convenient, the Sahara project was abandoned, only to be revisited several decades later.

== Economics ==
In 2015, the worldwide geothermal power capacity amounted to 12.8 gigawatts (GW). 28 percent, or 3,548 megawatts (MW), came from installations in the United States. International markets continue to show greater demand and global geothermal power capacity is expected to reach 14.5–17.6 GW by 2020. The Geothermal Energy Association (GEA) has estimated that only 6.9 percent of the global's total potential has been captured so far. The IPCC reported that geothermal power had the potential to be in the range of 35 GW to 2 TW globally. Countries generating more than 15 percent of their electricity from geothermal sources include El Salvador, Kenya, the Philippines, Iceland, New Zealand, and Costa Rica.

Geothermal power requires no fuel as it relies on thermal energy for the production of electricity. Because it is immune to fuel cost fluctuations, geothermal is more predictable for commercial pricing for consumers. However, capital costs tend to be higher than other methods of electric energy creation. Drilling wells accounts for over half the costs and exploration of potential sites entails significant risks and costs. In Nevada, a typical well costs about $10 million to drill, with a 20% failure rate.

In total, electrical station construction and well drilling costs about 2–5 million € per MW of electrical capacity, while the levelised energy cost is 0.04–0.10 € per kW·h. Enhanced geothermal systems tend to have capital costs above $4 million per MW and levelized energy cost above $0.054 per kW·h. Geothermal power is highly scalable as it is a source of renewable energy. While initial capital costs can be high, it has the ability to efficiently and effectively provide energy for rural communities and towns disconnected from larger power grid infrastructure.

== U.S. Tax Credits and Subsidies ==
=== Business Energy Tax Credit ===
The Business Energy Investment Tax Credit (ITC) is a U.S. federal corporate tax credit - applicable to commercial, industrial, utility, and agricultural sectors. Technologies that are eligible for the ITC are solar water heat, solar space heat, solar thermal electric, solar thermal process heat, photovoltaics, wind, biomass, geothermal electric, fuel cells, geothermal heat pumps, CHP/cogeneration, solar hybrid lighting, microturbines, and geothermal direct-use. This program is co-administered by the Internal Revenue Service (IRS) and the U.S. Department of Energy (DOE). The tax credits were expanded by the American Recovery and Reinvestment Act of 2009 and most components will last until December 31, 2016.

The credit is equal to 10% of expenditures, with no maximum credit limit stated. Eligible geothermal energy property includes geothermal heat pumps and equipment used to produce, distribute or use energy derived from a geothermal deposit. For electricity produced by geothermal power, equipment qualifies only up to, but not including, the electric transmission stage.

== Current Projects ==
RenewGeo by UC-Won.

== See also ==
- Enhanced geothermal system
- Geothermal heating
- Hot dry rock geothermal energy
- Alternative Energy
- Energy development
- Geothermal energy
- Solar power in Nevada
- Hot dry rock geothermal energy
- List of renewable energy topics by country
