= United Downs Deep Geothermal Power =

Privately owned British energy company

Geothermal Engineering Ltd.
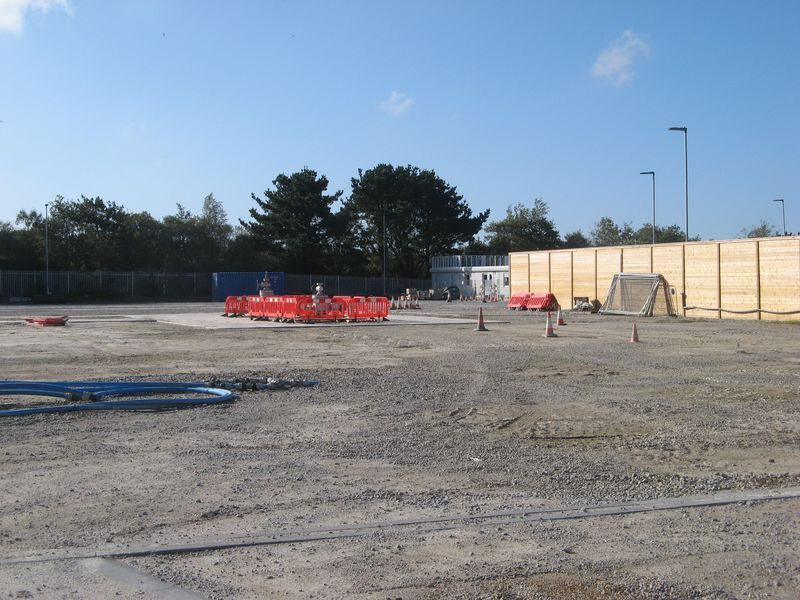
- Country: United Kingdom

External links
- Website: www.geothermalengineering.co.uk

United Downs Deep Geothermal Power is the United Kingdom's first operational geothermal electricity project. It is situated near Redruth in Cornwall, England. It is owned and operated by Geothermal Engineering (GEL), a private UK company. The drilling site is on the United Downs industrial estate, chosen for its geology, existing grid connection, proximity to access roads and limited impact on local communities. Energy is extracted by cycling water through a naturally hot reservoir and using the heated water to drive a turbine to produce electricity and for direct heating. A lithium resource was discovered in the well.

== History ==
The Camborne School of Mines led Cornish Hot Dry Rocks (HDR) project, undertaken in the 1980s at Rosemanowes Quarry, was designed to test the theory of inducing a fracture network within granite to create a geothermal reservoir.

Geothermal Engineering was founded in 2008 to specialise in the development of geothermal resources. Project funding was secured over the following five years from the European Regional Development Fund, Cornwall Council and private investors.

GEL drilled two wells into the Porthtowan fault zone between November 2018 and June 2019. The geothermal production well reached a depth of 5,275 m (17,306 ft) and the fluid injection well 2,393 m (7,851 ft).

Between August 2020 and July 2021, the wells underwent a series of injection tests to analyse the hydrology within the fractured geothermal reservoir. In addition, in July 2021, full reservoir testing (simultaneous production and injection) was undertaken for seven days. During this process, the reservoir was destressed to prevent microseismic events occurring during long term operation. GEL adhered to a strict monitoring, management and mitigation procedure to ensure that any induced seismicity was understood by community members.

In August 2020, the project's operations were further funded by the UK Getting Building Fund. GEL received a share of £14.3 million to demonstrate that lithium could be produced from geothermal brines. As of 2021, project costs were approximately £30 million.

In January 2021, GEL agreed to sell 3 MW of power for ten years to Ecotricity. In March 2023, the company received another £15 million in private funding.

In September 2023, the results of a contract for difference allocation round were published, in which United Downs Deep Geothermal Power Plant and two other projects by GEL were awarded a strike price of £119/MWh in 2012 prices (equivalent to £164 in 2023).

== Geology ==
The geothermal system employed to generate power at United Downs targeted a radiogenic granite batholith that exhibited enhanced permeability due to its intersection with the Porthtowan fault zone.

The Cornubian granite batholith stretches from Dartmoor to the Isles of Scilly and contains a high concentration of heat-producing isotopes such as thorium (Th), uranium (U) and potassium (K). This natural heat production means that the heat flow at United Downs is approximately double the UK average at 120 mWm^{−2}, and geothermal gradient is around 33-35 °C/km, almost 10 °C/km hotter than large parts of the UK.

Cornwall is also divided by a number of faults and fracture zones with a preferred orientation of NNW-SSE or ENE-WSW, believed to have been reactivated by post-orogenic extension after the Variscan Orogeny, with the ENE-striking fractures hosting magmatic mineral lodes and ‘elvans’ that were mined throughout the 19th and 20th centuries. NNW-SSE striking 'crosscourse' faults, which are often long and show evidence of significant displacement, are aligned parallel to the regional maximum horizontal stress and therefore are believed to be the most ‘open’ structures, providing enhanced permeability.

The United Downs wells encountered three main lithologies:

1. Killas (a low-grade, regionally metamorphosed and deformed mudstone of the Upper Devonian Mylor Slate Formation);
2. Microgranite
3. Granite.

The wells also intersected open NW-SE-striking fracture corridors related to the major 'crosscourse' of the Porthtowan Fault Zone.

== Community engagement ==
GEL's community engagement programme has been extremely important for the successful continuation of the United Downs geothermal project. From an early stage it was established that time, effort and a personal approach were crucial to finding the extent of the community and reaching a diverse range of its members. As a result, accurate, up-to-date information has been communicated to a broad range of the community via public visits to the GEL site, external presentations to interested groups, exhibitions at public events, printed flyers, online resources and through the wider media.

An inclusive and interactive education programme and careers events have also been run by GEL to give an insight into Cornwall's new and growing geothermal power and heat industry to students throughout Cornwall.

GEL also established a significant community fund, supporting sustainable and community-led projects in four local parishes with a shared grant of £40,000. This ensured that the local economy, people and environment benefitted as widely as possible from the project.

== See also ==
- Geothermal power in the United Kingdom
- Southampton District Energy Scheme, also the UK's first geothermal heat and power project
