= The Hot Rock =

The Hot Rock may refer to:

- The Hot Rock, the first (1970) John Dortmunder novel by Donald E. Westlake
- The Hot Rock (film), a 1972 movie based on the novel
- The Hot Rock (album), a 1999 album by Sleater-Kinney
- Hot rock energy, a.k.a. Hot dry rock geothermal energy
- Hot Rock & Alternative Songs, a Billboard chart
