= Westquay =

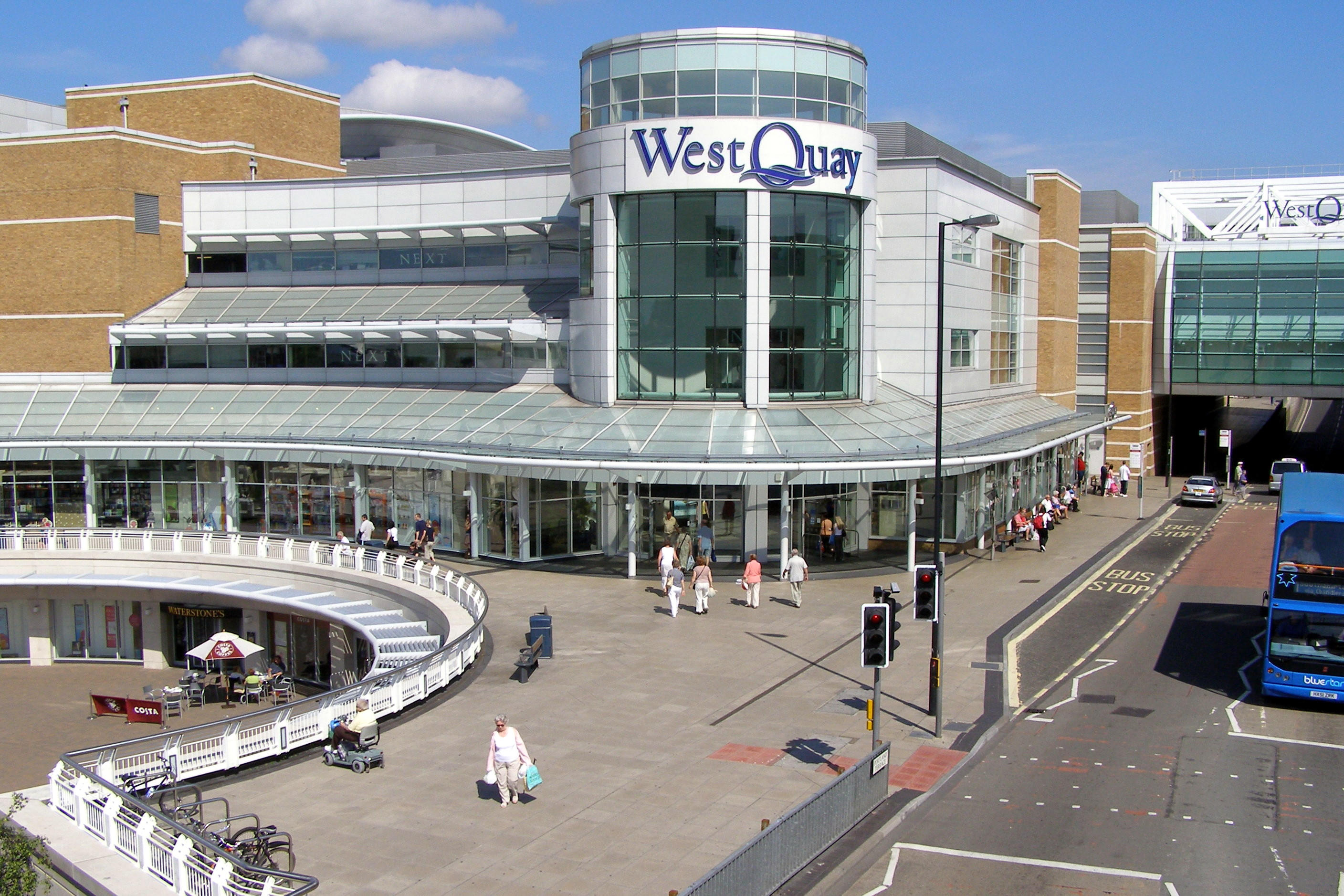
- The Arundel Circus entrance to Westquay North (before Westquay South)
- Location: Southampton, Hampshire, England
- Coordinates: 50.90327°N 1.40692°W
- Opened: 28 September 2000; 26 years ago
- Developer: Chapman Taylor & Partners
- Manager: Hammerson
- Owner: Hammerson
- Num. of stores: 126 active (including Westquay South)
- Num. of anchor tenants: 4 (including Westquay South)
- Floor area: 95,600 m^{2} (1,029,000 sq ft)
- Floors: 6 in Westquay North, 7 in Westquay South
- Parking: Yes, 1 Podium, 1 Multi Storey
- Website: www.west-quay.co.uk

Westquay (formerly WestQuay) is a shopping centre in Southampton, England. It has an area of 95,600 m^{2} (1,029,000 sq ft) of retail and leisure space and contains around 130 shops, including major retailers such as John Lewis, Marks & Spencer, Zara, Schuh, Waterstones, Hollister Co. and Apple.

It is situated in the city centre, close to the docks, with entrances on the main High Street (Above Bar Street), on Portland Terrace, through Waterstones and through John Lewis, and on Harbour Parade, through the new (2016-2017) Westquay South. There is a built-in multi-storey car park with an entrance into the centre along with a 3 tier car park beneath. Building work began in 1997 as the former Daily Echo building and Pirelli Cable Works were demolished to make way for the centre. Westquay North was opened on 28 September 2000.

The building is heated using geothermal energy via a district heating scheme, where a centralised plant uses heat from an aquifer underground and then distributes it to the buildings in the city centre. Westquay, alongside the civic centre, are part of the Southampton District Energy Scheme.

The John Lewis store replaced the local department store Tyrrell & Green, which met with mixed emotions from the local people. Marks & Spencer relocated from Above Bar Street to take the second anchor store.

There have been a few major changes to Westquay North's shops since its opening. Tower Records (which faced fierce competition from the HMV store across the street) was replaced with a Nike store, which closed after just a few months. This unit is now Pret a Manger, a sandwich retailer. Waitrose moved to Portswood in 2006 and the old Waitrose space has now been replaced by New Look, which was originally located in a smaller store a floor above. The former New Look store is now River Island. In early 2019 River Island relocated to Above Bar Street and the Unit was divided into two with Lego taking one of the newly created units. Waitrose did return, however, to Westquay North in 2015 within the lower ground floor of the John Lewis store, branded as Little Waitrose.

In mid-May 2009 the first Hollister store to be opened outside the extended London area opened in Westquay North: this is considered a major coup for Westquay as it reflects well on the strength of the retail offering available.

During the 2020 COVID-19 pandemic Westquay was closed for the first time other than on Christmas Day and Easter Sunday.

In November 2024, Hammerson took on full ownership of the centre.

ITV1 game show The Box filmed a challenge at the centre in late 2025, for an episode that was broadcast on October 4th 2026.

== Construction ==
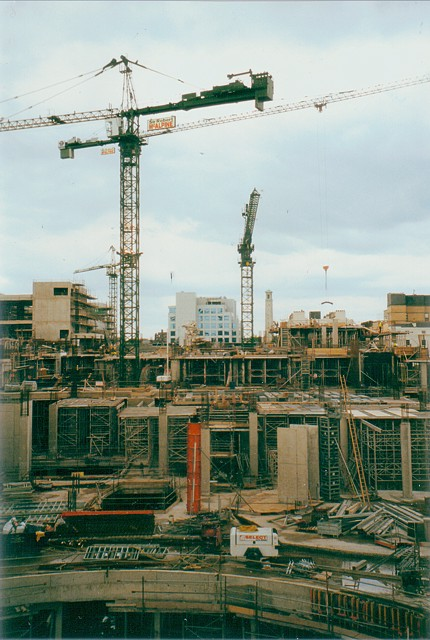
June 1999

Rebranded from WestQuay in January 2017, Westquay has been constructed on the former site of the Pirelli Cable Works and the 1960s Arundel Towers development (two office tower blocks above a multi-storey car park) and it measures approximately ¼ of a mile from one end of the site to the other. Demolition of the previous buildings began in September 1997 and Westquay opened on 28 September 2000.

The development crosses over three major roads: The 20 metre support structure from the two-storey glazed retail link over Portland Terrace weighs 400 tonnes, and Western Esplanade, opened in 1900 to link the Royal Pier with Southampton Central railway station, was cut in half by the centre. Harbour Parade is crossed by a footbridge to the adjacent multi-storey car park.

It absorbs a 4½ metre change in ground level between east and west boundaries and the length of the mall from Above Bar to Harbour Parade is 400 m, and on top of the mall, The roof lights extend to around 350 m in length. There is a total of 32 lifts throughout the development. The steelwork took 20 weeks to design, order and manufacture, 13 tower cranes worked on the site. The tallest crane had a 66 m mast and a reach of 65 m.

Southampton's nearby Geothermal Heat Station supplies heat and chilling facilities to the centre.

== Westquay South ==
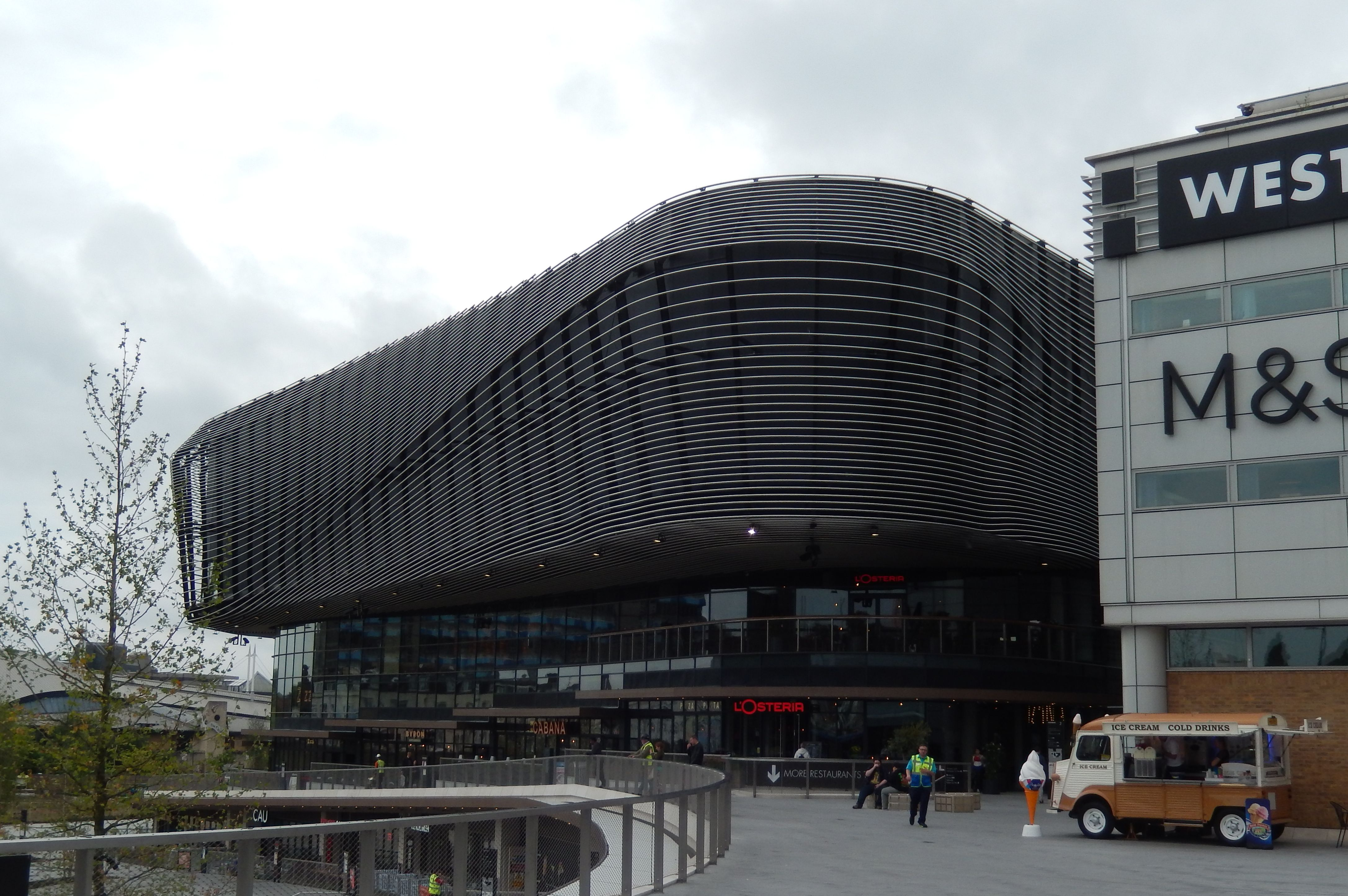
Westquay South with L'Osteria

During the late-2000s, Hammerson devised up plans for a £70 million extension entitled Watermark WestQuay. In December 2012, the model of the master plan was unveiled to the public, designed by London architects Acme Space and structural engineer, AKT II. On 11 April 2013, it was announced that Hammerson had submitted the planning application to Southampton City Council, on which the council approved the outline planning application on 23 July 2013.

On 14 April 2014, Hammerson submitted detailed designs for phase one of its Watermark WestQuay scheme to Southampton City Council. On 25 June 2014, the designs for phase one of the development were approved. With the new name of WestQuay Watermark, the building work for phase one began in January 2015, with the closing of the existing walkway and the demolition of the entrance ramp.

The first phase comprises a landmark 10 screen cinema, owned by Showcase Cinemas as part of their Cinema De Lux brand, a bowling alley and arcade from Hollywood Bowl, and twenty-one restaurants (Wahaca, Zizzi, Byron Hamburgers, Five Guys, Nando's, Bill's Restaurant, Cabana, Cosmo, Cau, Red Dog Saloon, All Bar One, TGI Fridays, The Diner, Franco Manca, Thaikhun, The Real Greek, Casa Brasil, Kupp and L'Osteria as of December 2016) alongside a large public piazza.

On 29 November 2016, it was announced that the first wave of restaurants (CAU, The Real Greek, Red Dog Saloon, Franco Manca, Thaikhun, Byron, Cabana, and COSMO) would be open on 8 December 2016. Several remaining restaurants, Hollywood Bowl and Showcase Cinema de Lux opened throughout December 2016 and early 2017.

WestQuay Watermark was renamed Westquay South when the development first opened its first five restaurants (CAU, The Real Greek, Franco Manca, Thaikhun, and Byron) on 8 December 2016.

Showcase Cinema de Lux, located on the 4th level of Westquay South opened on 10 February 2017.

== Food Terrace Re-development (2012) ==
During summer 2012, the food terrace was re-developed. Completed by the Autumn of 2012, the updated food terrace had new restaurants, including: Wagamama, Café Rouge, Pizza Express, Ed's Easy Diner and Tortilla Mexican Grill. The existing restaurants (McDonald's, KFC, Pizza Hut, Harry Ramsden's, and Toby Carvery) were also refurbished.

The outside terrace area became enclosed for all-weather access, with the seating updated to include a mixture of soft and hard furnishings; and inside, a glass bridge was installed, linking Café Rouge with Wagamama. The food terrace was rebranded as 'Dining at WestQuay', for a more casual dining option.

As of March 2016, Café Rouge was replaced by the Handmade Burger Co and Toby Carvery was converted into a Subway

As of October 2020, the available choice on the Dining Level is McDonald's, Subway, Wagamama, Tortilla, Chopstix, Slim Chickens, Pizza Hut, Pizza Express, Ed's Easy Diner, Nando's and YO! Sushi. The offering on the dining level is now complemented by the restaurants and eateries in Westquay South.

== Gallery ==
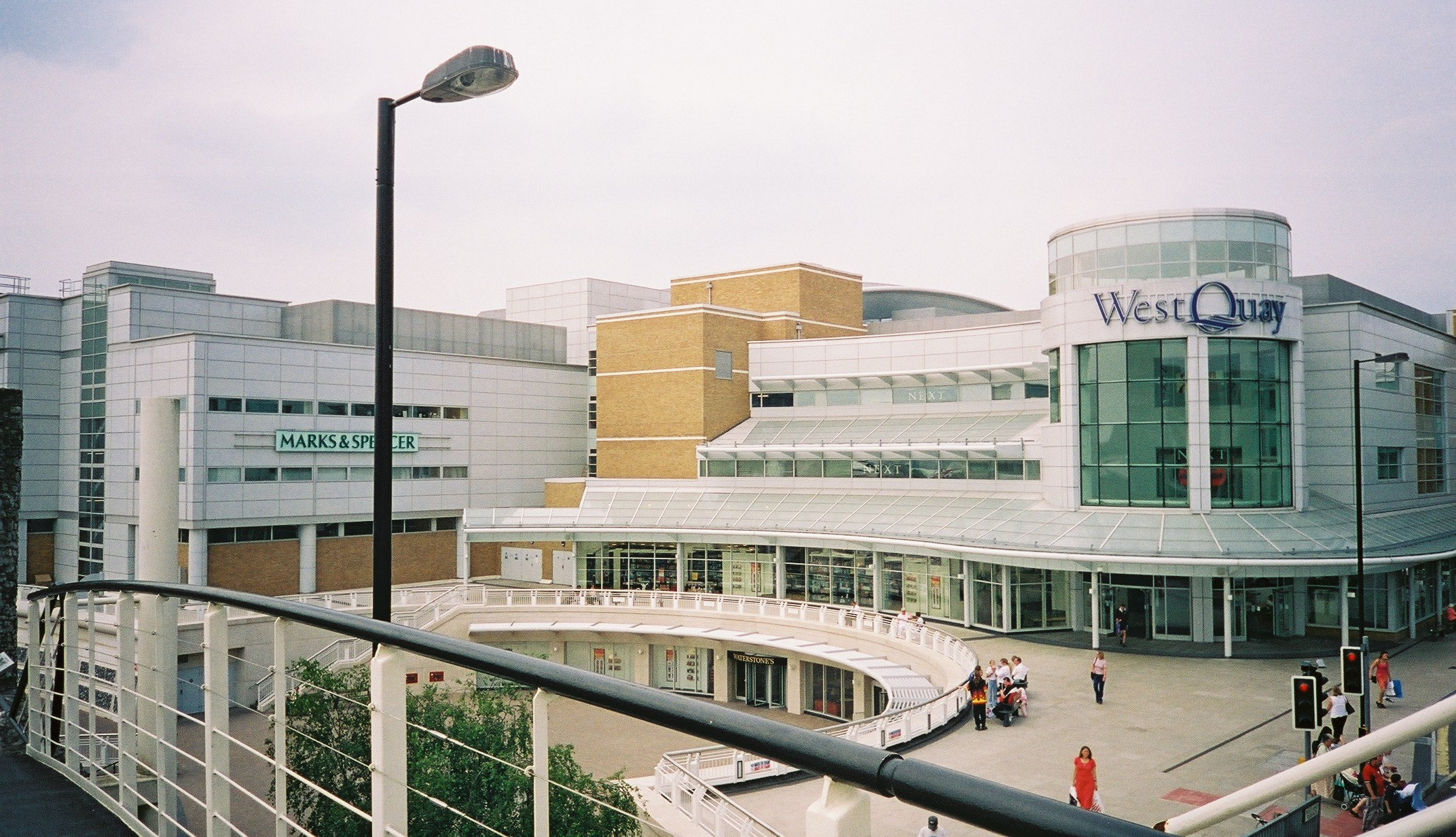
Westquay, 2002

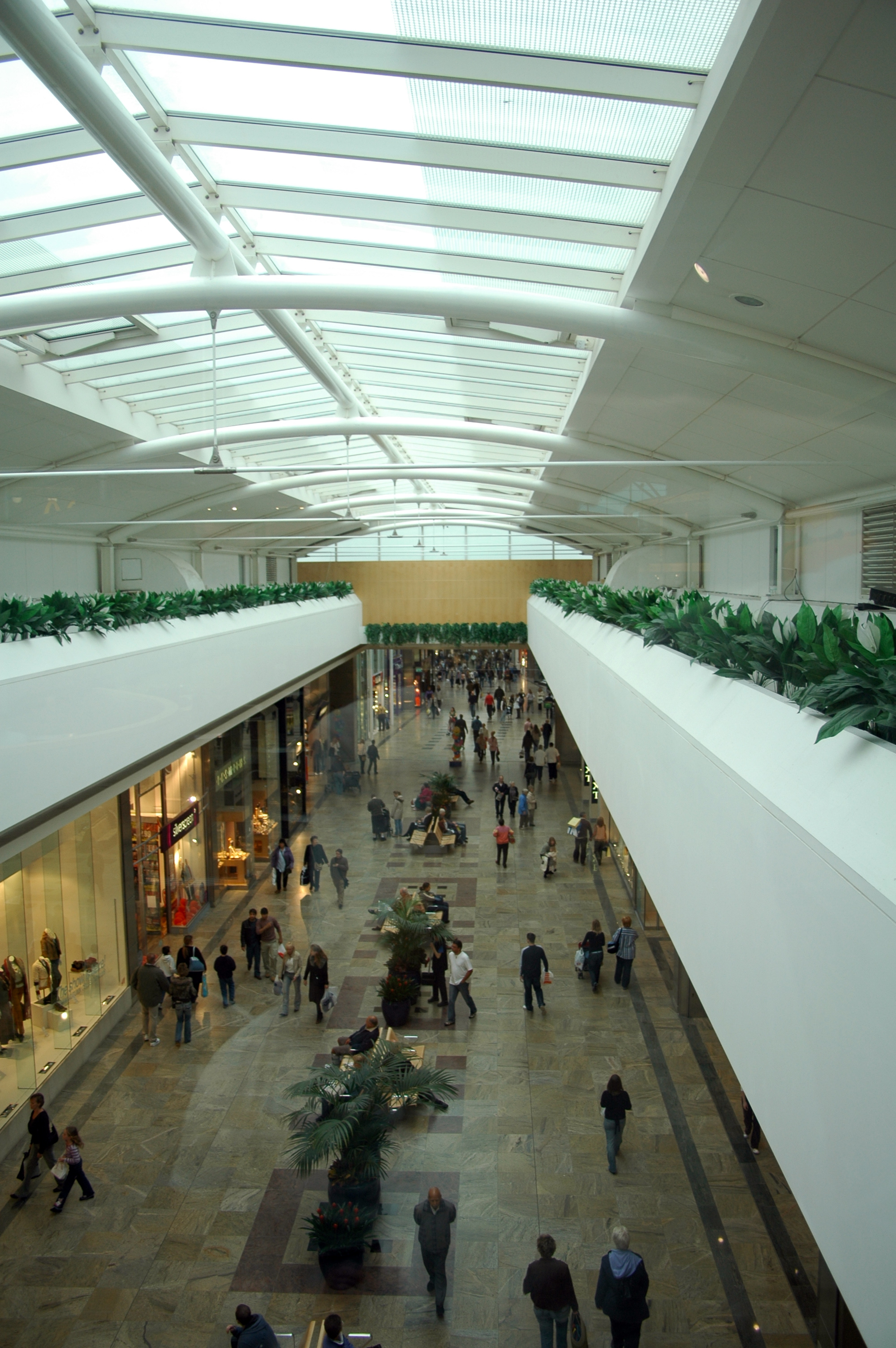
Westquay, 2005

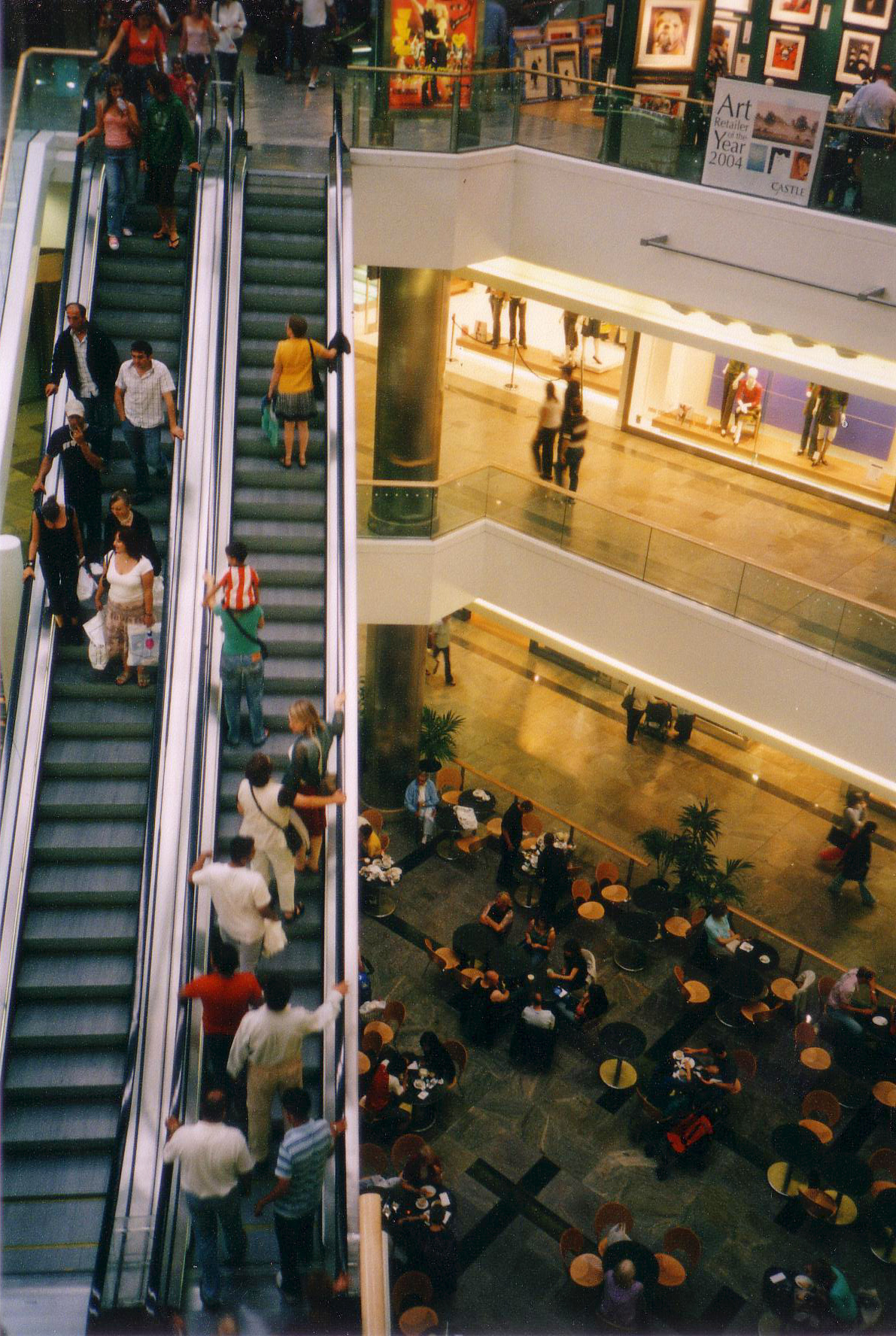
Westquay, 2005

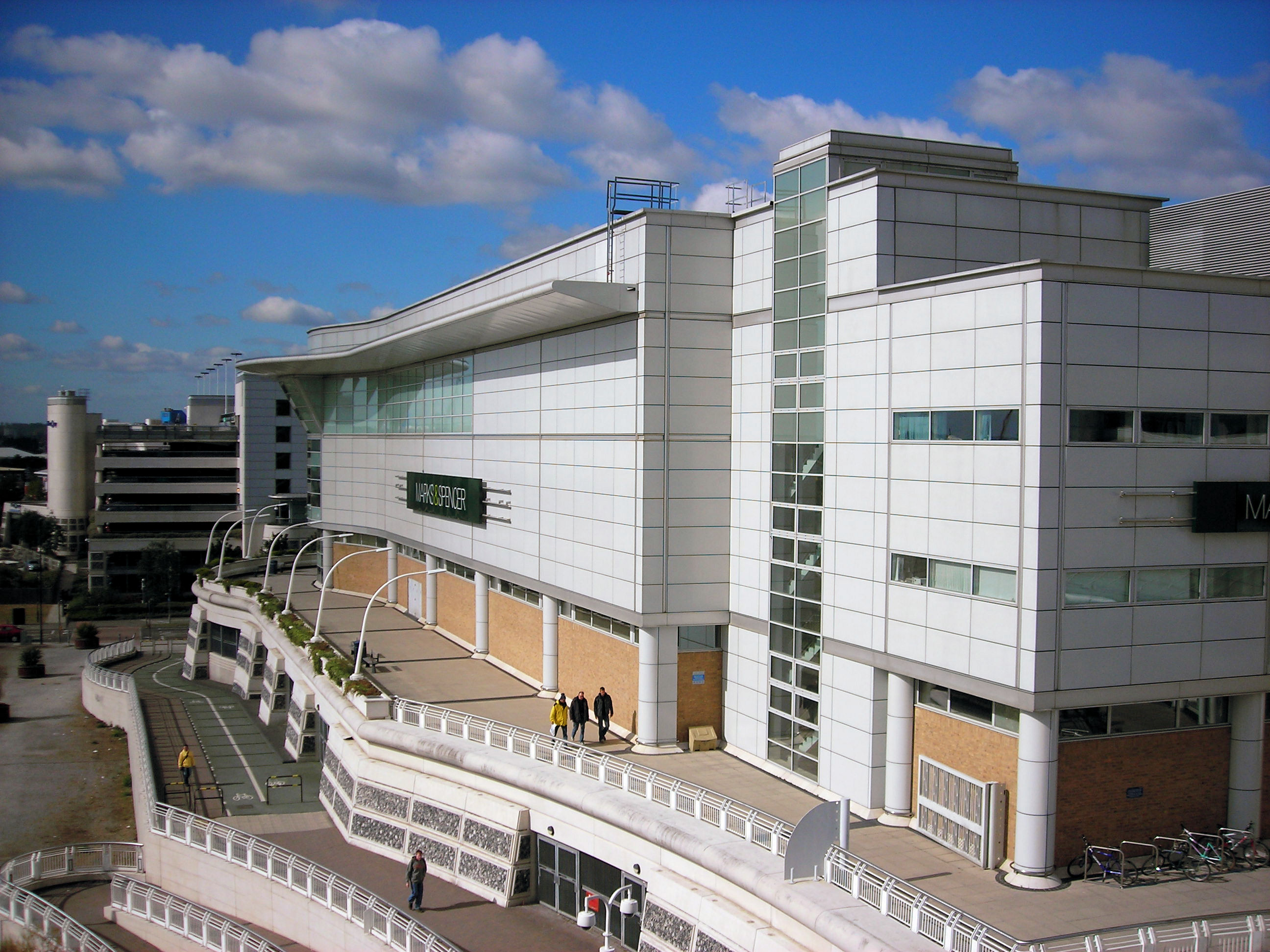
Westquay, 2007

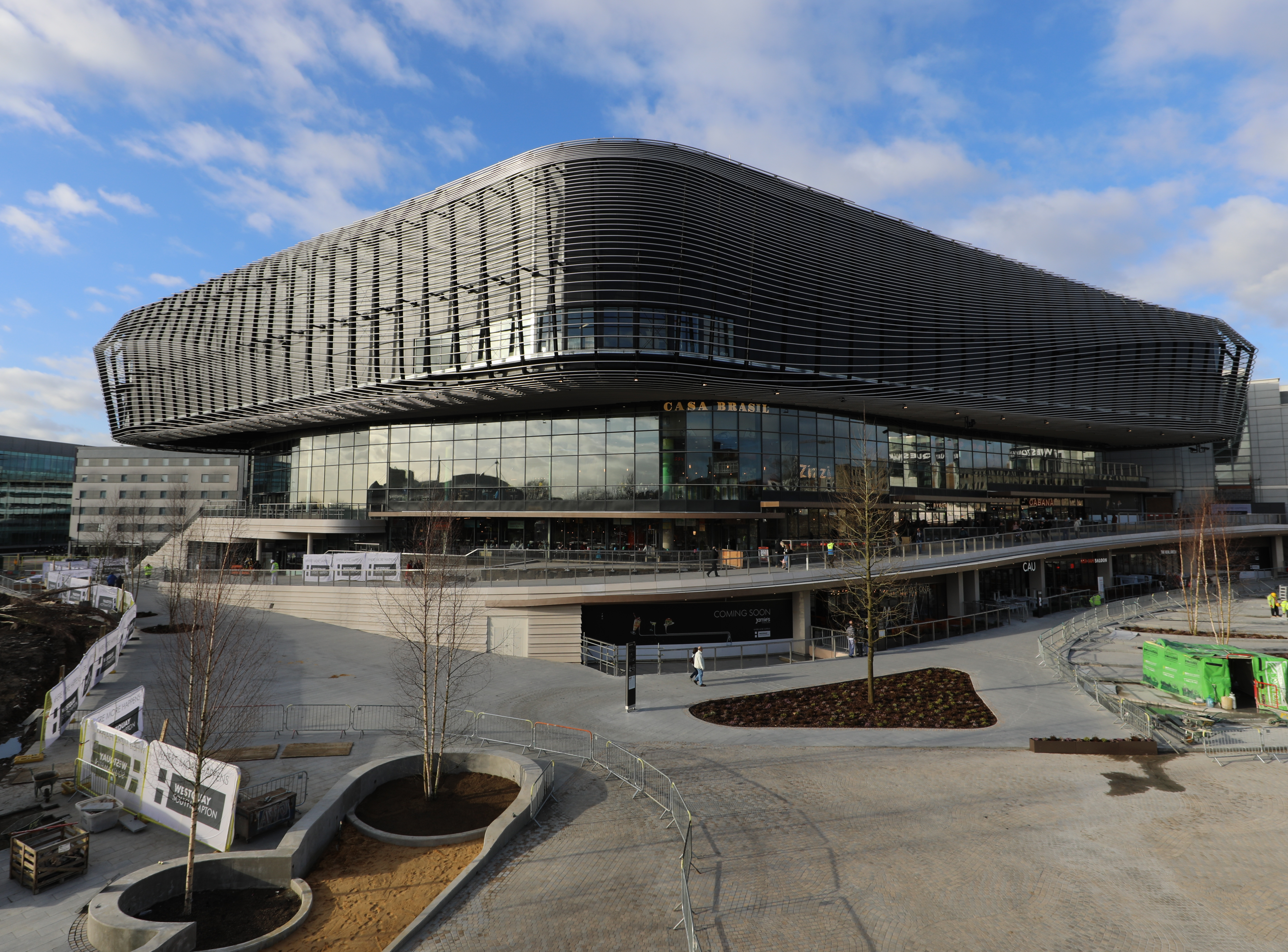
Westquay South, January 2017

Westquay South, 2018
