= Enhanced geothermal system =

Type of electricity generation system

Enhanced geothermal system: 1 Reservoir, 2 Pump house, 3 Heat exchanger, 4 Turbine hall, 5 Production well, 6 Injection well, 7 Hot water to district heating, 8 Porous sediments, 9 Observation well, 10 Crystalline bedrock

An enhanced geothermal system (EGS) generates geothermal electricity without natural convective hydrothermal resources. Traditionally, geothermal power systems operated only where naturally occurring heat, water, and rock permeability are sufficient to allow energy extraction. However, most geothermal energy within reach of conventional techniques is in dry and impermeable rock. EGS technologies expand the availability of geothermal resources through stimulation methods, such as 'hydraulic stimulation'.

== Overview ==
In many rock formations natural cracks and pores do not allow water to flow at economic rates. Permeability can be enhanced by hydro-shearing, pumping high-pressure water down an injection well into naturally-fractured rock. The injection increases the fluid pressure in the rock, triggering shear events that expand pre-existing cracks and enhance the site's permeability. As long as the injection pressure is maintained, high permeability is not required, nor are hydraulic fracturing proppants required to maintain the fractures in an open state.

Hydro-shearing is different from hydraulic tensile fracturing, used in the oil and gas industry, which can create new fractures in addition to expanding existing fractures.

Water passes through the fractures, absorbing heat until forced to the surface as hot water. The water's heat is converted into electricity using either a steam turbine or a binary power plant system, which cools the water. The water is cycled back into the ground to repeat the process.

EGS plants are baseload resources that produce power at a constant rate. Unlike hydrothermal, EGS is apparently feasible anywhere in the world, depending on the resource depth. Good locations are typically over deep granite covered by a 3–5 kilometres (1.9–3.1 mi) layer of insulating sediments that slow heat loss.

Advanced drilling techniques can penetrate hard crystalline rock to depths of up to, or exceeding, 15 km, providing access to higher-temperature rock (400 °C and above) as temperature increases with depth.

EGS plants are expected to have an economic lifetime of 20–30 years.

EGS systems are under development in Australia, France, Germany, Japan, Switzerland, and the United States. The world's largest EGS project is a 25-megawatt demonstration plant in Cooper Basin, Australia. Cooper Basin has the potential to generate 5,000–10,000 MW.

== Research and development ==
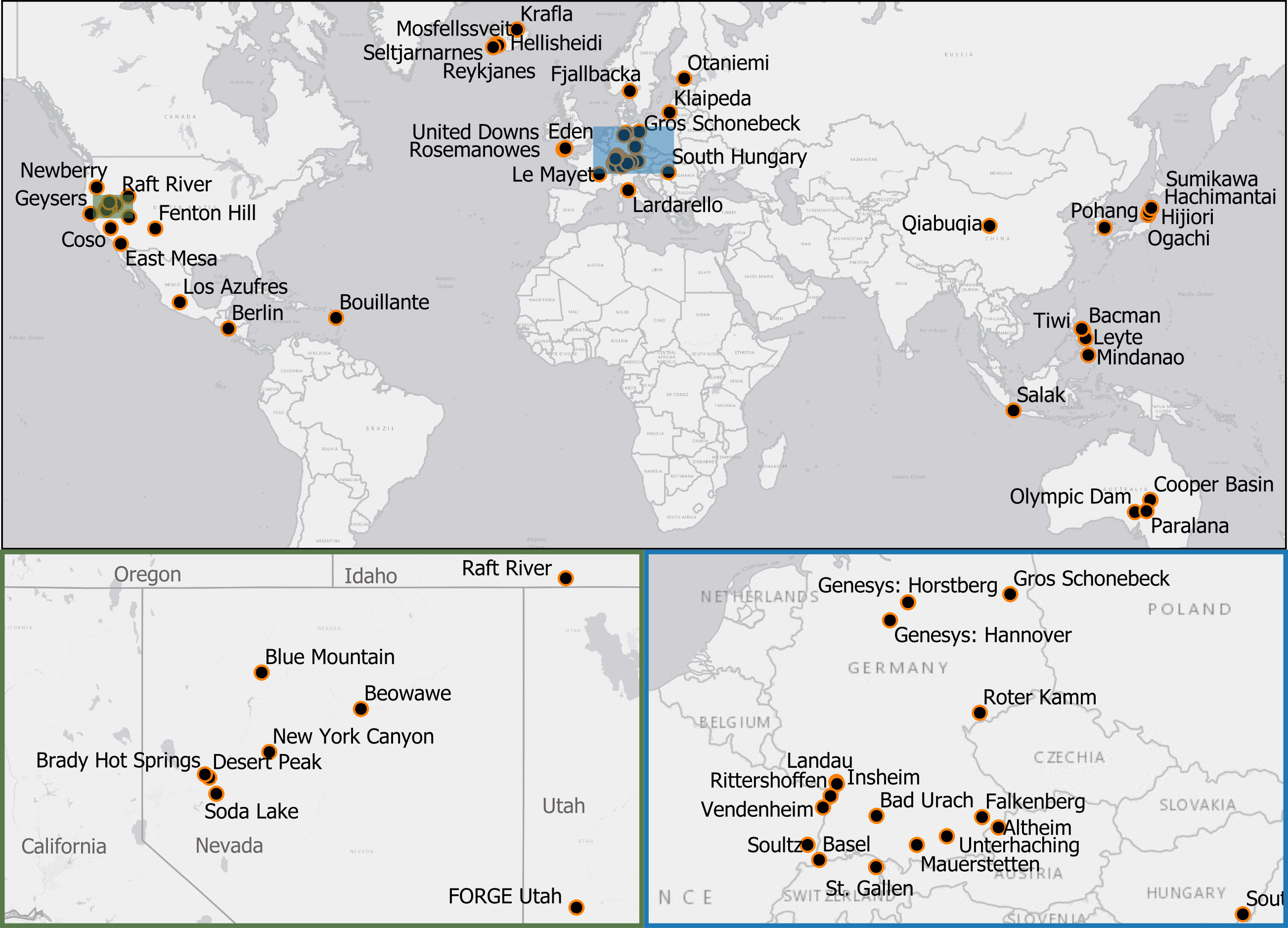
Map of 64 EGS projects around the world

EGS technologies use a variety of methods to create additional flow paths. EGS projects have combined hydraulic, chemical, thermal, carbon-based, and explosive stimulation methods. Some EGS projects operate at the edges of hydrothermal sites where drilled wells intersect hot, yet impermeable, reservoir rocks. Stimulation methods enhance that permeability. The table below shows EGS projects around the world.

Name	Country	State/region	Year Start	Stimulation method	References
Mosfellssveit	Iceland		1970	Thermal and hydraulic	
Fenton Hill	USA	New Mexico	1973	Hydraulic and chemical	
Bad Urach	Germany		1977	Hydraulic	
Falkenberg	Germany		1977	Hydraulic	
Rosemanowes	UK		1977	Hydraulic and explosive	
Le Mayet	France		1978	Hydraulic	,
East Mesa	USA	California	1980	Hydraulic	
Krafla	Iceland		1980	Thermal	
Baca	USA	New Mexico	1981	Hydraulic	
Geysers Unocal	USA	California	1981	Explosive	
Beowawe	USA	Nevada	1983	Hydraulic	
Bruchal	Germany		1983	Hydraulic	
Fjällbacka	Sweden		1984	Hydraulic and chemical	
Neustadt-Glewe	Germany		1984		
Hijiori	Japan		1985	Hydraulic	
Soultz	France		1986	Hydraulic and chemical	
Altheim	Austria		1989	Chemical	
Hachimantai	Japan		1989	Hydraulic	
Ogachi	Japan		1989	Hydraulic	
Sumikawa	Japan		1989	Thermal	
Tyrnyauz	Russia	`	1991	Hydraulic	,
Bacman	Philippines		1993	Chemical	
Seltjarnarnes	Iceland		1994	Hydraulic	
Mindanao	Philippines		1995	Chemical	
Bouillante	France		1996	Thermal	
Leyte	Philippines		1996	Chemical	
Hunter Valley	Australia		1999		
Groß Schönebeck	Germany		2000	Hydraulic and chemical	
Tiwi	Philippines		2000	Chemical	
Berlin	El Salvador		2001	Chemical	
Cooper Basin: Habanero	Australia		2002	Hydraulic	
Cooper Basin: Jolokia 1	Australia		2002	Hydraulic	
Coso	USA	California	1993, 2005	Hydraulic and chemical	
Hellisheidi	Iceland		1993	Thermal	
Genesys: Horstberg	Germany		2003	Hydraulic	
Landau	Germany		2003	Hydraulic	
Unterhaching	Germany		2004	Chemical	
Salak	Indonesia		2004	Chemical, thermal, hydraulic and cyclic pressure loading	
Olympic Dam	Australia		2005	Hydraulic	
Paralana	Australia		2005	Hydraulic and chemical	
Los Azufres	Mexico		2005	Chemical	
Basel	Switzerland		2006	Hydraulic	
Larderello	Italy		1983, 2006	Hydraulic and chemical	
Insheim	Germany		2007	Hydraulic	
Desert Peak	USA	Nevada	2008	Hydraulic and chemical	
Brady Hot Springs	USA	Nevada	2008	Hydraulic	
Southeast Geysers	USA	California	2008	Hydraulic	
Genesys: Hannover	Germany		2009	Hydraulic	
St. Gallen	Switzerland		2009	Hydraulic and chemical	
New York Canyon	USA	Nevada	2009	Hydraulic	
Northwest Geysers	USA	California	2009	Thermal	
Newberry	USA	Oregon	2010	Hydraulic	
Mauerstetten	Germany		2011	Hydraulic and chemical	
Soda Lake	USA	Nevada	2011	Explosive	
Raft River	USA	Idaho	1979, 2012	Hydraulic and thermal	
Blue Mountain	USA	Nevada	2012	Hydraulic	
Rittershoffen	France		2013	Thermal, hydraulic and chemical	
Klaipėda	Lithuania		2015	Jetting	
Otaniemi	Finland		2016	Hydraulic	
South Hungary EGS Demo	Hungary		2016	Hydraulic	
Pohang	South Korea		2016	Hydraulic	
FORGE Utah	USA	Utah	2016	Hydraulic	
Reykjanes	Iceland		2006, 2017	Thermal	
Roter Kamm (Schneeberg)	Germany		2018	Hydraulic	
United Downs Deep Geothermal Power (Redruth)	UK		2018	Hydraulic	
Eden (St Austell)	UK		2018	Hydraulic	
Qiabuqia	China		2018	Thermal and hydraulic	
Vendenheim	France		2019		
Project Red	USA	Nevada	2023	Hydraulic	
Cape Station	USA	Utah	2023	Hydraulic	

=== Australia ===
The Australian government has provided research funding for the development of Hot Dry Rock technology. Projects include Hunter Valley (1999), Cooper Basin: Habanero (2002), Cooper Basin: Jolokia 1 (2002), and Olympic Dam (2005).

=== European Union ===
The EU's EGS R&D project at Soultz-sous-Forêts, France, connects a 1.5 MW demonstration plant to the grid. The Soultz project explored the connection of multiple stimulated zones and the performance of triplet well configurations (1 injector/2 producers). Soultz is in the Alsace.

Induced seismicity in Basel led to the cancellation of the EGS project there.

The Portuguese government awarded, in December 2008, an exclusive license to Geovita Ltd to prospect and explore geothermal energy in one of the best areas in continental Portugal. Geovita is now studying an area of about 500 square kilometers together with the Earth Sciences department of the University of Coimbra's Science and Technology faculty.

=== South Korea ===
The Pohang EGS project started in December 2010, with the goal of producing 1 MW.

The 2017 Pohang earthquake may have been linked to the activity of the Pohang EGS project. All research activities were stopped in 2018.

=== United Kingdom ===
United Downs Deep Geothermal Power is the United Kingdom's first operational geothermal electricity project. It is situated near Redruth in Cornwall, England. It is owned and operated by Geothermal Engineering (GEL), a private UK company. The drilling site is on the United Downs industrial estate, chosen for its geology, existing grid connection, proximity to access roads and limited impact on local communities. Energy is extracted by cycling water through a naturally hot reservoir and using the heated water to drive a turbine to produce electricity and for direct heating. A lithium resource was discovered in the well.

=== United States ===
==== Early days — Fenton Hill ====
The first EGS effort — then termed Hot Dry Rock — took place at Fenton Hill, New Mexico with a project run by the federal Los Alamos Laboratory. It was the first attempt to make a deep, full-scale EGS reservoir.

The EGS reservoir at Fenton Hill was completed in 1977 at a depth of about 2.6 km, exploiting rock temperatures of 185 °C. In 1979, the reservoir was enlarged with additional hydraulic stimulation and was operated for about 1 year. The results demonstrated that heat could be extracted at reasonable rates from a hydraulically stimulated region of low-permeability hot crystalline rock. In 1986, a second reservoir was prepared for initial hydraulic circulation and heat extraction testing. In a 30-day flow test with a constant reinjection temperature of 20 °C, the production temperature steadily increased to about 190 °C, corresponding to a thermal power level of about 10 MW. Budget cuts ended the study.

==== 2000-2010 ====
In 2009, The US Department of Energy (USDOE) issued two Funding Opportunity Announcements (FOAs) related to enhanced geothermal systems. Together, the two FOAs offered up to $84 million over six years.

The DOE opened another FOA in 2009 using stimulus funding from the American Reinvestment and Recovery Act for $350 million, including $80 million aimed specifically at EGS projects,

==== FORGE ====
The Frontier Observatory for Research in Geothermal Energy (FORGE) is a US government program supporting research into geothermal energy. The FORGE site is near Milford, Utah, funded for up to $140 million. As of 2023, numerous test wells had been drilled, and flux measurements had been conducted, but energy production had not commenced.

==== Cornell University — Ithaca, NY ====
Developing EGS in conjunction with a district heating system is a part in Cornell University's Climate Action Plan for their Ithaca campus. The project began in 2018 to determine feasibility, gain funding and monitor baseline seismicity. The project received $7.2 million in USDOE funding. A test well was to be drilled in spring of 2021, at a depth of 2.5 –5 km targeting rock with a temperature > 85 °C. The site is planned to supply 20% of the campus' annual heating load. Promising geological locations for reservoir were proposed in the Trenton-Black River formation (2.2 km) or in basement crystalline rock (3.5 km). The 2 mile deep borehole was completed in 2022.

==== EGS "earthshot" ====
In September 2022, the Geothermal Technologies Office within the Department of Energy's Office of Energy Efficiency and Renewable Energy announced an "Enhanced Geothermal Shot" as part of their Energy Earthshots campaign. The goal of the Earthshot is to reduce the cost of EGS by 90%, to $45/megawatt hour by 2035.

==== Other federal funding and support ====
The Infrastructure Investment and Jobs Act authorized $84 million to support EGS development through four demonstration projects. The Inflation Reduction Act extended the production tax credit (PTC) for renewable energy sources (including geothermal) until 2024 and included geothermal energy in the new Clean Electricity PTC to begin in 2024.

== Induced seismicity ==
Induced seismicity is earth tremors caused by human activity. Seismicity is common in EGS, because of the high pressures involved. Seismicity events at the Geysers geothermal field in California are correlated with injection activity.

Induced seismicity in Basel led the city to suspend its project and later cancel the project.

According to the Australian government, risks associated with "hydrofracturing induced seismicity are low compared to that of natural earthquakes, and can be reduced by careful management and monitoring" and "should not be regarded as an impediment to further development". Induced seismicity varies from site to site and should be assessed before large scale fluid injection.

== EGS potential ==
=== United States ===
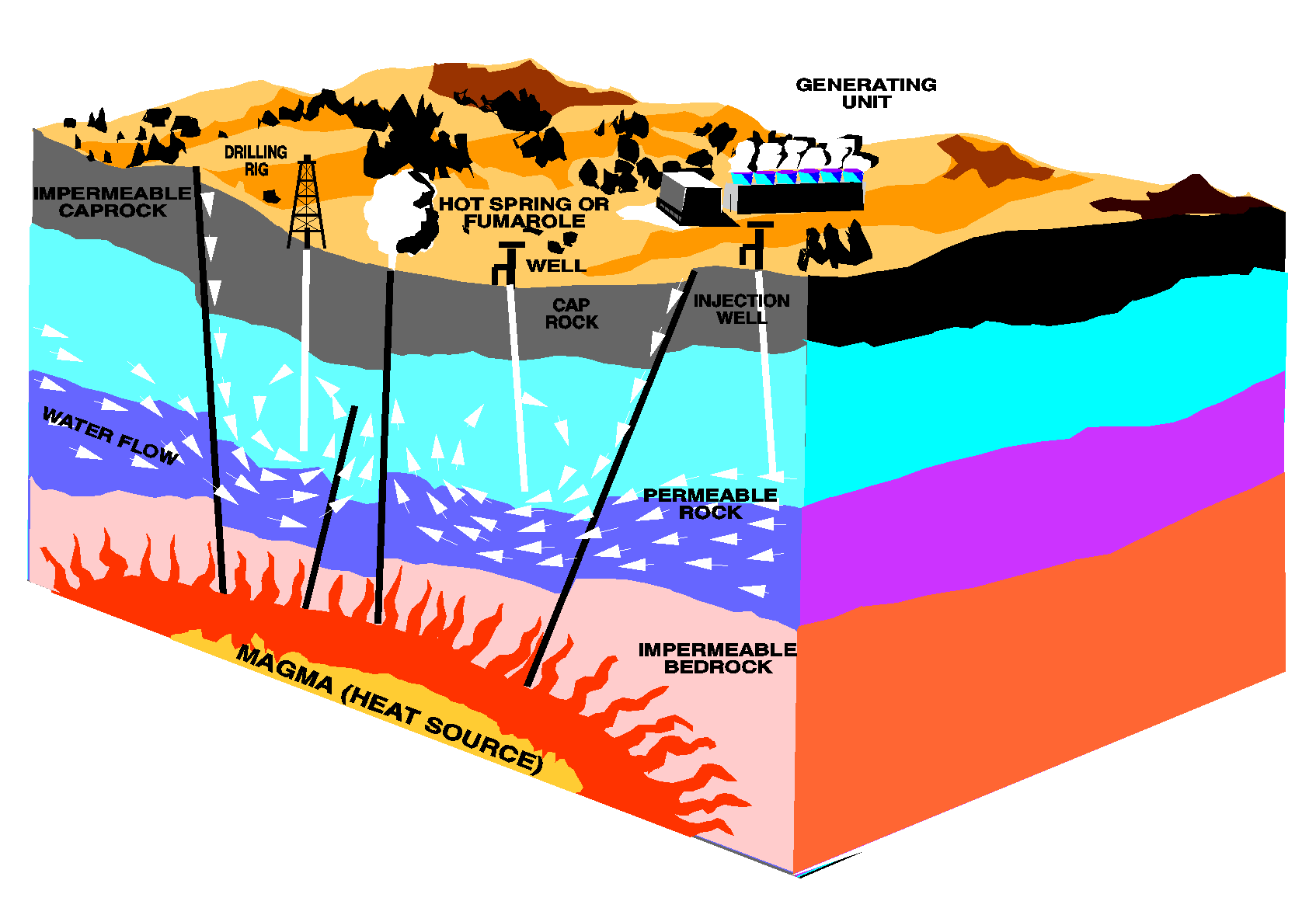
Geothermal power technologies.

A 2006 report by MIT, funded by the U.S. Department of Energy, conducted the most comprehensive analysis to date on EGS. The report offered several significant conclusions:

- Resource size: The report calculated United States total EGS resources at 3–10 km of depth to be over 13,000 zettajoules, of which over 200 ZJ were extractable, with the potential to increase this to over 2,000 ZJ with better technology. It reported that geothermal resources, including hydrothermal and geo-pressured resources, to equal 14,000 ZJ — or roughly 140,000 times U.S. primary energy use in 2005.
- Development potential: With an R&D investment of $1 billion over 15 years, the report estimated that 100 GWe (gigawatts of electricity) or more could be available by 2050 in the United States. The report further found that "recoverable" resources (accessible with today's technology) were between 1.2 and 12.2 TW for the conservative and moderate scenarios respectively.
- Cost: The report claimed that EGS could produce electricity for as low as 3.9 cents/kWh. EGS costs were found to be sensitive to four main factors:
  1. Temperature of the resource
  2. Fluid flow through the system
  3. Drilling costs
  4. Power conversion efficiency

== See also ==
- Caprock – Rock overlying a less resistant type
- Drilling – Cutting process that uses a drill bit to cut a circular hole into the workpiece
- Drilling rig – Integrated system to drill wells
- Geothermal energy exploration in Central Australia
- Geothermal energy in the United States – Overview of geothermal power in the United States of America
- Geothermal exploration
- Hot dry rock geothermal energy – Extraction of heat from subterranean rocks
- Iceland Deep Drilling Project – Icelandic geothermal project
- Laser drilling – Process of creating thru-holes using laser cutting methods
- Rosemanowes Quarry – British granite quarry
