= Frontier Observatory for Research in Geothermal Energy =

Coordinates: 38.504°N 112.896°W

The Frontier Observatory for Research in Geothermal Energy (FORGE) is a US government program supporting research into geothermal energy. The FORGE site is near Milford, Utah, funded for up to $140 million. As of 2023, numerous test wells had been drilled, and flux measurements had been conducted, but energy production had not commenced.

== History ==
In February 2014, the Department of Energy (DOE) announced the intent to establish "a dedicated subsurface laboratory" to investigate and develop enhanced geothermal systems. In June 2018 DOE funded a location outside of Milford, Utah for up to $140 million.

== Site ==
The site is located along the Colorado Plateau and Basin and Range Province transition zone. It is primarily composed of intrusive Oligocene through Miocene batholith emplaced into Precambrian metamorphic (Gneiss) and Paleozoic sedimentary rocks. The site is west of the Mineral Mountains and about two km east of the north–south trending Opal Mond Fault (OMF), perpendicular to the east–west trending Negro Mag Fault (NMF). FORGE is dominated by a fault-fracture mesh system with OMF as one of its most active features. Fault structures vary from steeply dipping faults west of the Mineral Mountains to more gently steeping faults to the east.

The reservoir is located approximately between 1,525 and 2,896 meters (5,003 and 9,501 ft) depth in which temperature ranges from 175 to 225 °C. The rock is aged from 8 Ma to 25.4 Ma. Roosevelt Hot Springs (RHS) to the east is a hydrothermal area with temperatures ranging from about 100°C at the surface to over 250 °C at a depth of roughly 4,000 meters (13,000 feet). These temperatures indicate the presence of cooling magma in the shallow crust.

== Research ==
More than 80 shallow gradient wells (<500 m depth) and 20 deeps wells (>500 m depth) were drilled. Analyses from the shallow well data reported that the encountered granitic rocks were not producing fluids, but were hot. A lack of fluid production indicated these rocks are impermeable and that the site is a classic example of a hot dry rock energy system. The thermal grounds cover most of the northern Milford valley. The highest temperature wells (greater than 80 °C) are located east of the OMF above the RHS hydrothermal system. Near-surface profiles (less than 80 m depth) of temperature gradient are similar in central, southern and western sectors at roughly 70 °C per km and do not exceed 270 °C, even at higher temperature wells to the west.

The primary well descends vertically 6,000 feet (1.8 km), then continues 5,000 feet (1.5 kilometers) at a 65 degree angle. The well employed a diamond-tipped bit, cutting drilling costs by 20 percent.
