= Rosemanowes Quarry =

British granite quarry

Coordinates: 50.1679°N 5.1727°W

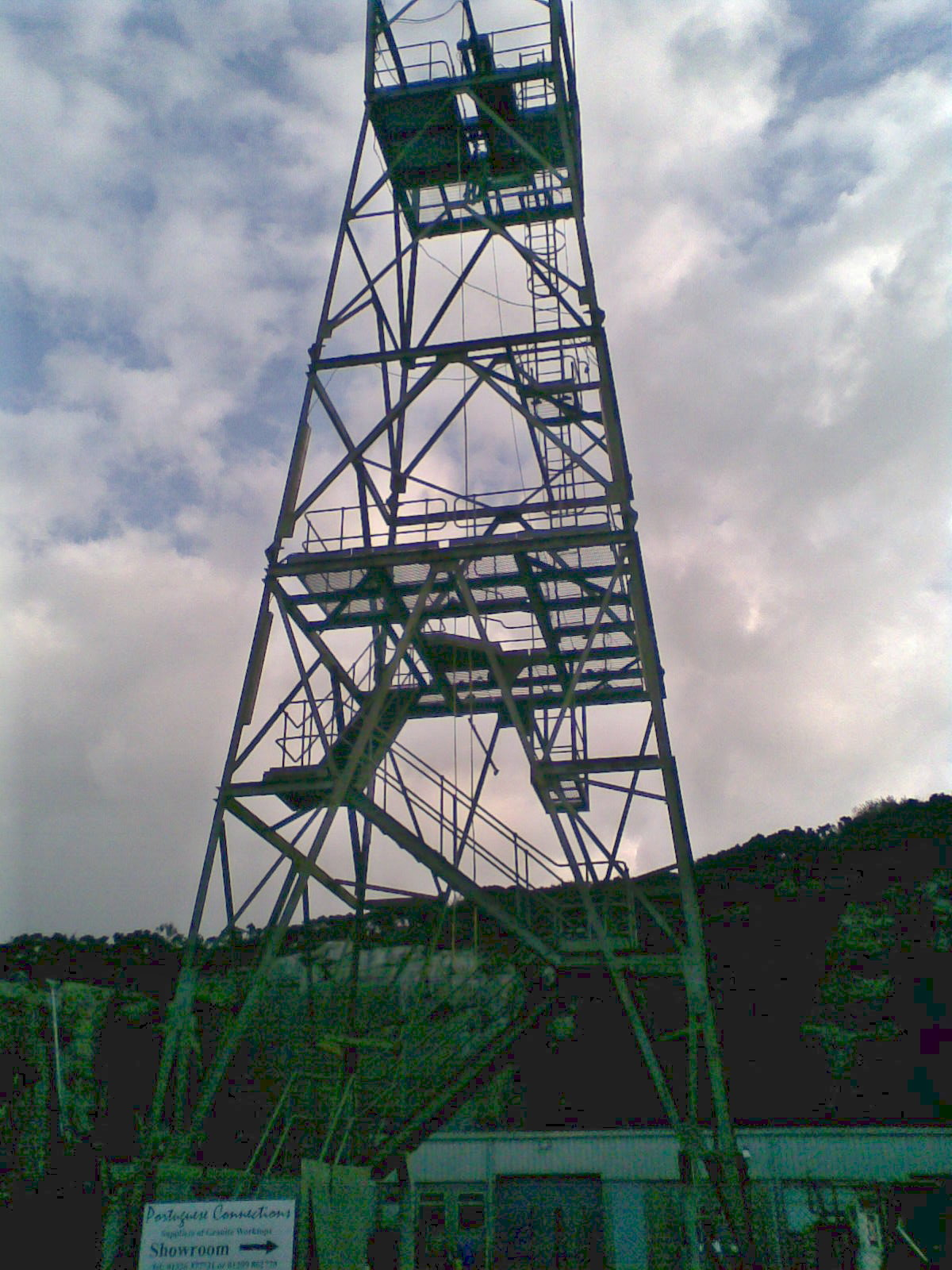
Drilling tower at the Rosemanowes Quarry, site of the HDR project.

Rosemanowes Quarry, near Penryn, Cornwall, England, was a granite quarry and the site of an early experiment in extracting geothermal energy from the earth using hot dry rock (HDR) technology.

== Quarry ==
In the nineteenth century the quarry provided stone for building projects in Britain and abroad as well as for the Ponsanooth viaduct near Penryn and the Carnon Valley viaduct between Truro and Falmouth.

== Geothermal energy research project ==
The site was chosen as the research site because the granite in the area has the highest heat flow in England (120 milliwatts per square metre). The trials began in 1977 in the wake of the 1973 oil crisis and an earlier trial in the United States at Fenton Hill. The trials at Rosemanowes concluded in 1980, although studies continued until 1991. Funding for the initial project was provided by the Department of Energy (now the Department of Trade and Industry) and by the European Commission. The research facilities and staff transferred to Camborne School of Mines Associates Limited in 1992, the trading arm of the Camborne School of Mines. The project had two aims

1. To see if hot dry rocks could be fractured by water pressure alone, enabling a current of cold water from an inlet borehole to pass easily through the mass and to be collected at an outlet borehole some distance away. The trial proved to be successful, and showed that explosives were not required to fracture this Cornish hot granite at depth.
2. To find out if the rocks were hot enough to make steam for a turbine to generate electricity. This second aim was not achieved at the depths attained. Though the rocks did yield substantial quantities of hot water, to reach a temperature to generate steam hot enough to drive a turbine would have required drilling a further kilometre or more into the granite, an option which was too expensive to pursue at that time.

With government and EU support the expertise of the scientists and engineers at Rosemanowes was used to support the European HDR project at Soultz-sous-Forêts, and a number of commercial contracts ensued exploiting HDR techniques, such as microseismic monitoring, in the oil and gas industry. Rosemanowes Quarry and the assets of CSMA, including intellectual property, were acquired by Asea Brown Boveri in 1997. In 2004, Schlumberger acquired the intellectual property and some of the staff most closely associated with microseismic monitoring and the quarry was sold off.

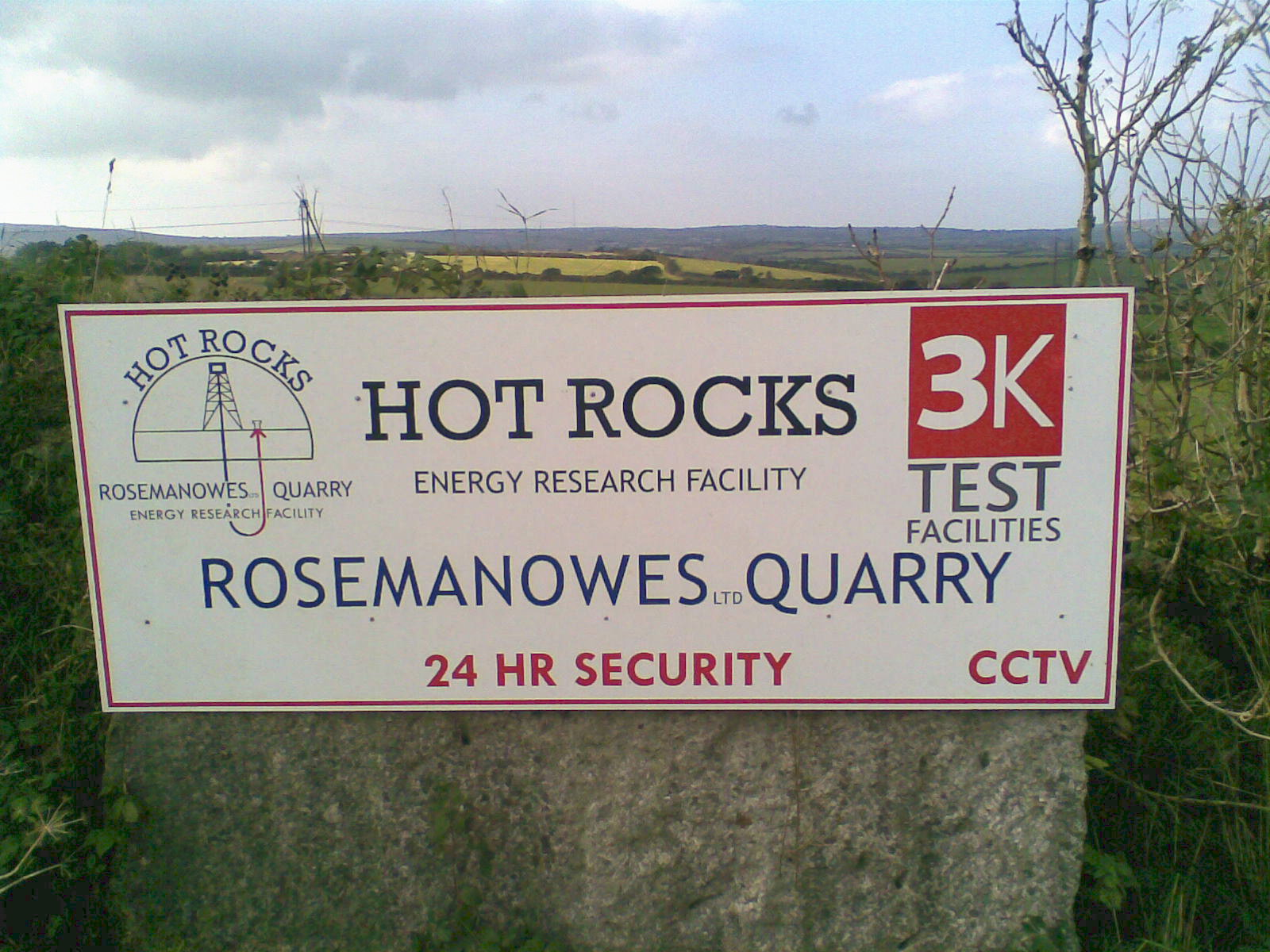
Sign to Rosemanowes Quarry

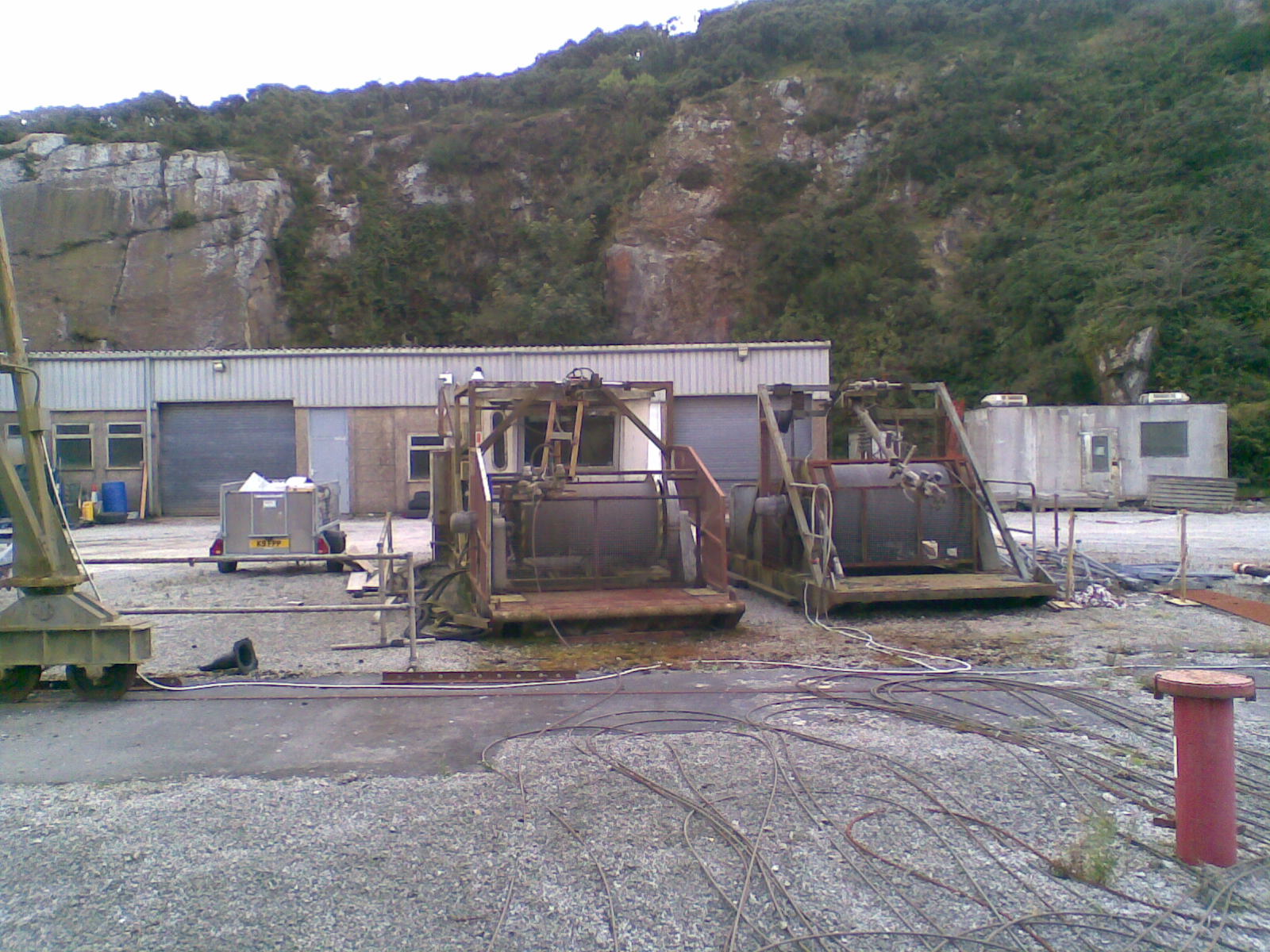
Winches

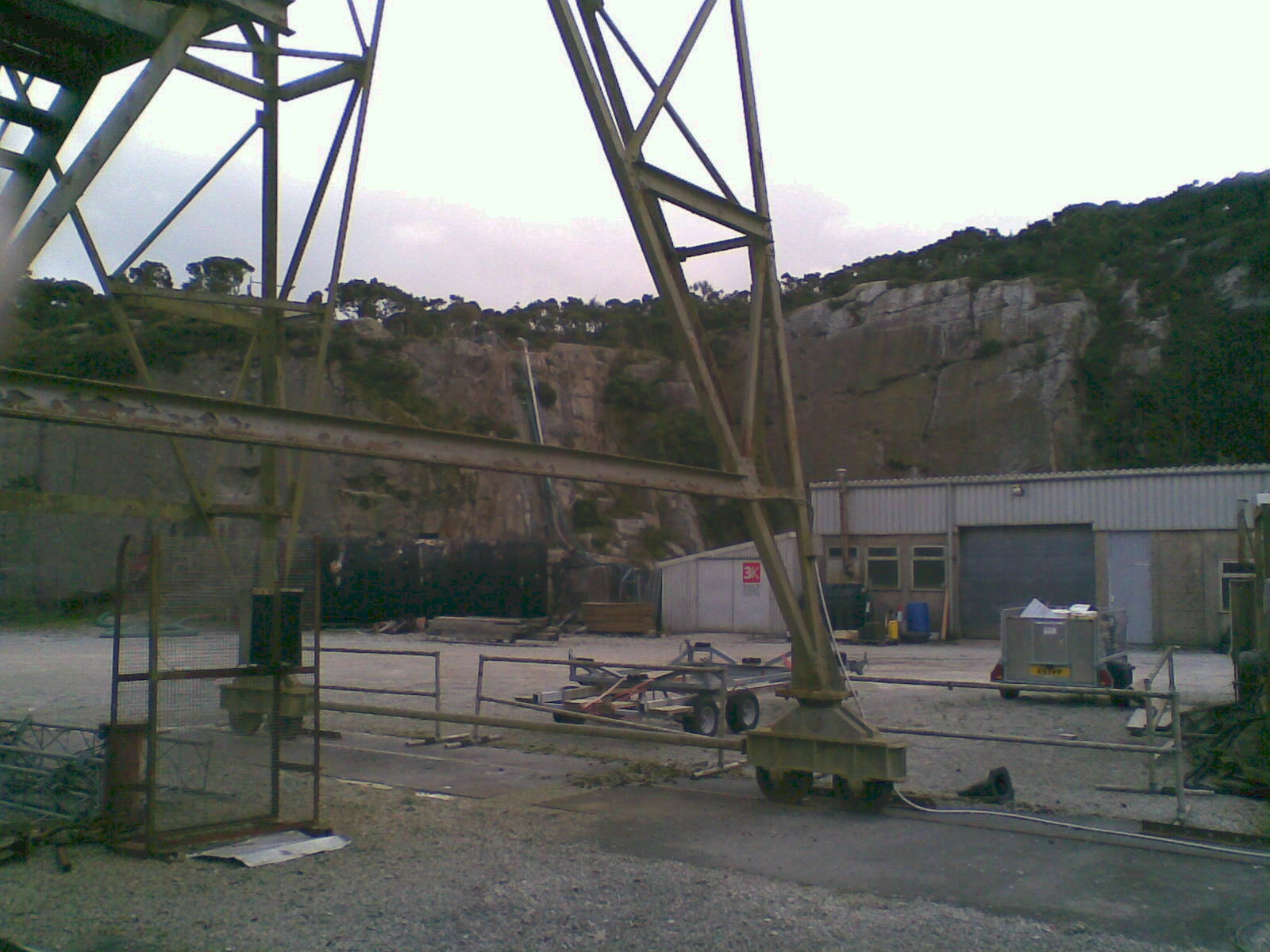
Tower wheels

In 2006, the site was acquired by 3K Facilities. The company now offers deep borehole test facilities in one of the best-logged sites in the world. All the deep boreholes are now available to hire for a range of down hole testing. There are three deep boreholes (2,350 m (7,710 ft), 2,180 m (7,150 ft), 2,800 m (9,200 ft)), four uncased 300 m (980 ft) holes and one 150 m (490 ft) hole inclined at 30 degrees, as well as micro seismic testing and a wind turbine test environment on this 20 acres (81,000 m^{2}) site.

Although the energy has not yet been exploited commercially, the data provided by the tests has been widely used to test numerical simulation codes. The dataset contributed significantly to the geothermal power plant built with European Union sponsorship at Soultz-sous-Forêts.

In March 2013, the quarry was put up for sale by the owners 3K Facilities.

== Borehole Seismic Test and Development Facility ==
In February 2014 Rosemanowes Quarry was purchased by Avalon Sciences (a Somerset-based borehole seismic instrumentation company) with the intention to develop the site in to an industry leading facility for testing down hole seismic and logging instrumentation. The extensively characterised boreholes and wells within homogenous granite facilitates an ideal locality to prove down hole seismic receivers and sources, all extensively used within the oil and gas exploration and monitoring industries. This site will be available for use to both industry and academic institutions by the end of 2014/early 2015.

== Use by US forces during World War II ==
During the Second World War, the Quarry was used for storage by US forces, preparing for the invasion of Europe, which started in June 1944.

== Location ==
The quarry is at Herniss, to the north of the A 394 road, between Rame and Longdowns. Ordnance Survey, Explorer series, Map 103, : grid reference SW73453460.

== See also ==
- Geothermal power in the United Kingdom
- Energy use and conservation in the United Kingdom
- Renewable energy
