= Southampton District Energy Scheme =

District heating and cooling system in England

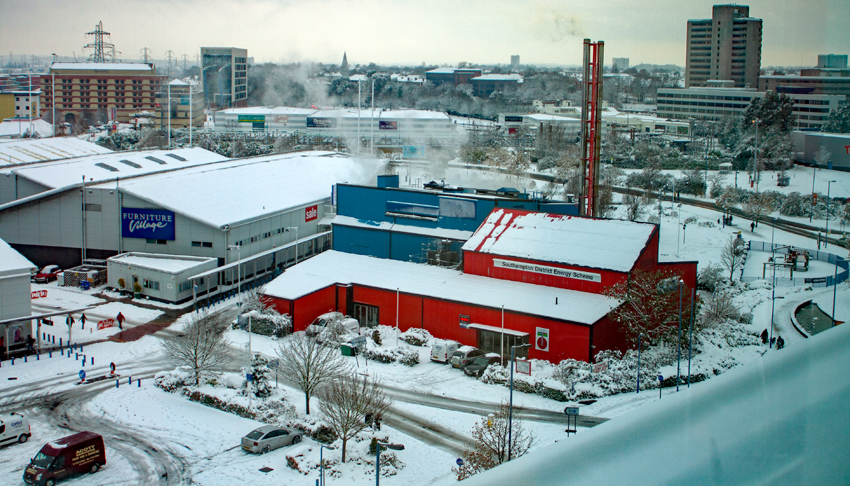
- Country: United Kingdom
- Location: Southampton
- Coordinates: 50°54′17″N 1°24′35″W
- Status: Operational
- Commission date: 1986
- Owner: ENGIE

Geothermal power station
- Min. source temp.: 76 °C
- Max. well depth: 1,800 m (5,900 ft)

External links
- Commons: Related media on Commons

The Southampton District Energy Scheme is a district heating and cooling system in Southampton, United Kingdom. The system is owned and operated by ENGIE.

== History ==
In the 1980s the Department of Energy undertook a research and development programme to examine the potential of geothermal aquifers in the UK. However, after some initial success drilling a well in the Wessex Basin in 1981, it was deemed too small to be commercially viable. The project was abandoned by the Department of Energy, but Southampton City Council took the decision to create the UK's first geothermal power scheme. This was undertaken as part of a plan to become a "self-sustaining city" in energy generation, promoted by City Council officer Mike Smith and council leader Alan Whitehead.

Pumping started in 1986 from the Wessex Basin aquifer at a depth of 1,800 m (5,900 ft) and a temperature of 76 °C (169 °F). The system initially supplied only the Southampton Civic Centre, but was gradually expanded to serve over 1,000 residential properties, as well as the WestQuay shopping centre, the Royal South Hants Hospital, Solent University and the Carnival offices; and is part of an enlarged city centre district heating system that includes other combined heating, cooling and power sources.

By 2007 the system had 11 km (6.8 miles) of pipes, and was producing 40 GWh of heat, 22 GWh of electricity and 8 GWh of cooling per year.

By 2014 the system provided 7 MW CHP, 2 MW of geothermal power, and 1 MW from biomass, saving 12,000 tons CO_{2} per year.

== See also ==
- Geothermal power in the United Kingdom
