= Handmade Burger Co =

Chain restaurant

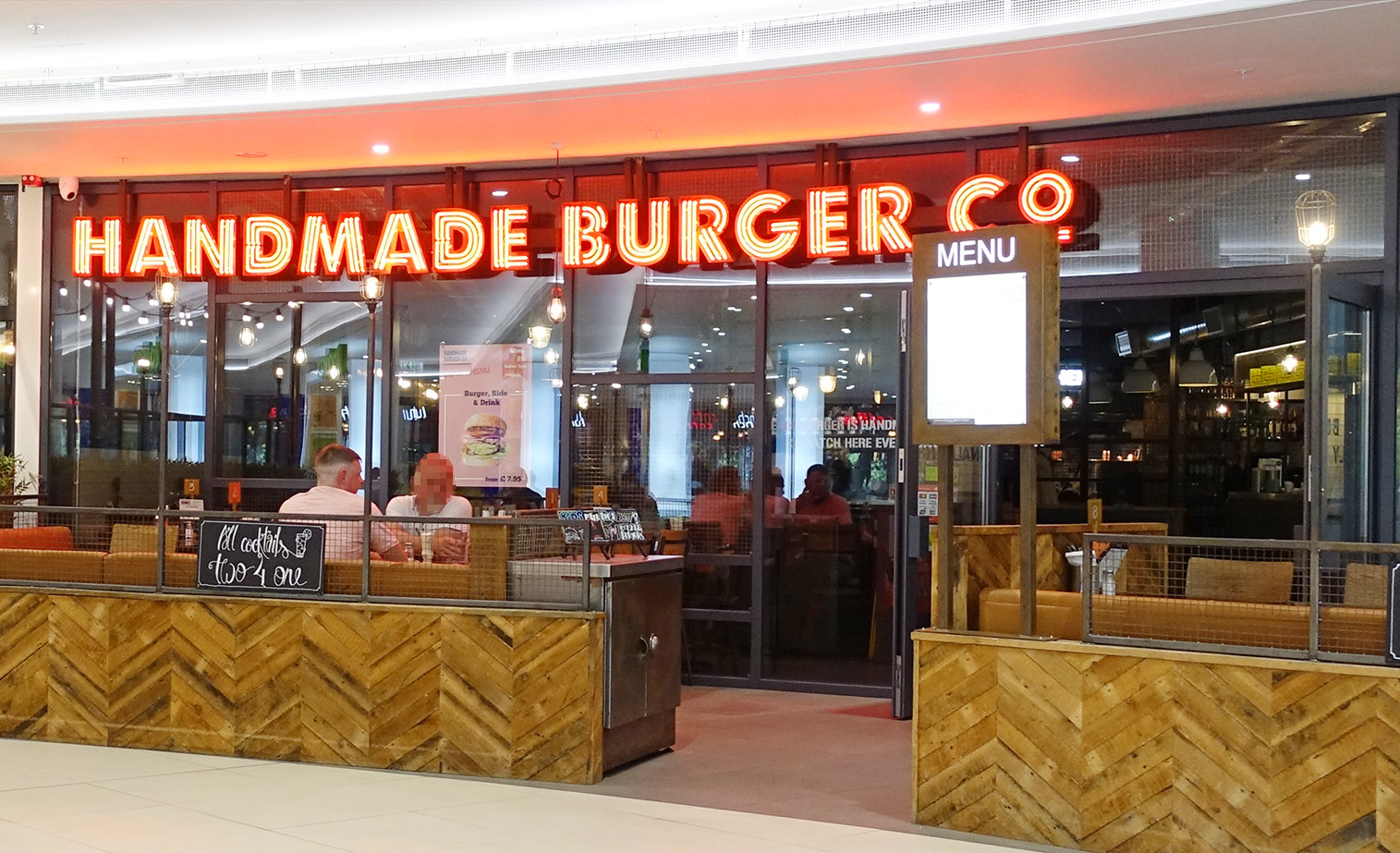
- A Handmade Burger Co branch in Bournemouth
- Industry: Restaurants
- Founded: 2006
- Area served: United Kingdom

Handmade Burger Co is a restaurant chain in the United Kingdom serving beef, chicken and vegetable burgers.

== History ==
The first restaurant was opened in Birmingham in 2006 by Chris Sargeant. In 2015, the company opened its largest restaurant, in Grand Central, Birmingham, following a £600,000 cash injection. Upon opening, there were 24 restaurants.

On 6 July 2017, the company went into administration, with nine of its 29 restaurants closing immediately. Prior to this, Handmade Burger Co was operating with nearly 900 members of staff.

The company collapsed into administration on 23 January 2020 for a second time. All 18 remaining restaurants ceased trading immediately. The demise of the chain was put down to over-saturation of the casual dining market in the United Kingdom, with consumers spending less and opting for lower-end options.

In April 2021, the brand was re-launched by a former manager and Howitt Hospitality Consultants. The first branch to reopen was at Meadowhall in Sheffield, and its Lincoln branch reopened on 7 September 2021.

== See also ==
- List of hamburger restaurants
