= Insheim Geothermal Power Station =

Geothermal power station in Germany

Geothermiekraftwerk Insheim
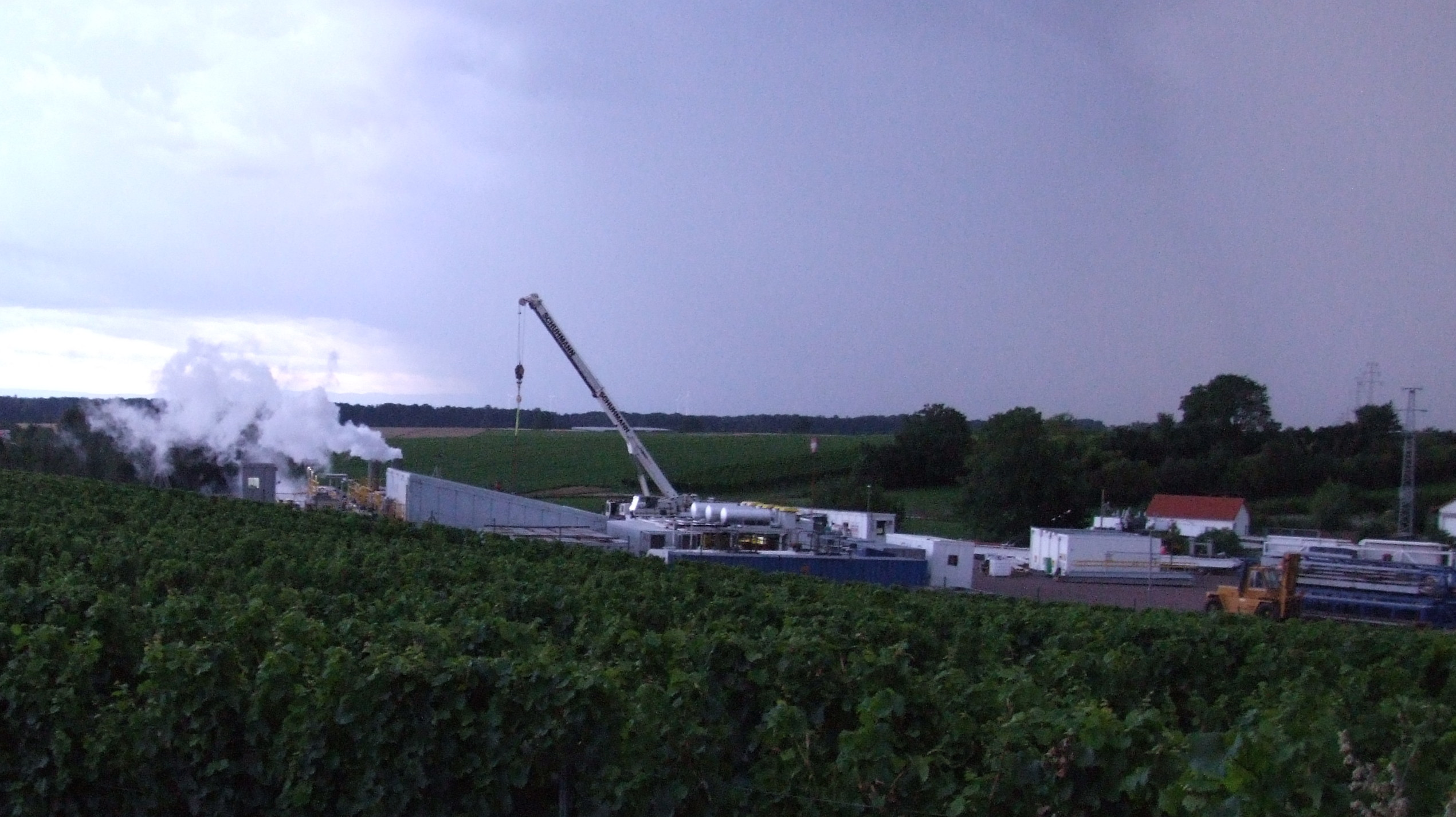
- Insheim Geothermal Power Station
- Country: Germany
- Location: Rhineland-Palatinate
- Coordinates: 49°9′14″N 8°9′12.4″E
- Status: Operational
- Commission date: 2012
- Owner: Pfalzwerke geofuture
- Operator: Pfalzwerke geofuture

Geothermal power station
- Type: Organic Rankine cycle
- Min. source temp.: about 160°C
- Max. well depth: 4000 m.
- Cogeneration?: yes
- Thermal capacity: 6-10 MW

Power generation
- Nameplate capacity: 4.8 MW

External links
- Website: www.geothermie-insheim.de

The Insheim Geothermal Power Station is a geothermal power station in Rhineland-Palatinate.

The Power Station is related to earthquakes, the strongest had a magnitude of 2.4 and was registered on the 09.April.2010 10:52:22. Until 18.June.2020 154 earthquakes were registered in Insheim. However, there are more earthquakes related to Insheim, one of the strongest occurred on 20.May.2020 with a magnitude of 2.2. The Upper Rhine Plain has a high seismic risk and is home to the BASF, one of the biggest chemical factories in Europe.

Vulcan Energy also operated a lithium extraction pilot plant at the site, testing the recovery of lithium from geothermal brine produced by the geothermal wells. The process was investigated as part of the company's efforts to combine geothermal energy production with domestic lithium extraction.
