= Fenton Hill Observatory =

Observatory in New Mexico, US

Coordinates: 35.88105°N 106.67476°W

Fenton Hill Observatory is an astronomical research facility operated by Los Alamos National Laboratory in the Jemez Mountains of New Mexico, about 35 miles (56 km) west of Los Alamos. The site is home to several astronomical experiments and observatories spanning 30 acres (120,000 m^{2}). It is also known as Technical Area 57 (TA-57) and is located at an elevation of 8,700 feet (2,700 m) in a region shielded from light pollution. Los Alamos National Laboratory has a use agreement with the Forest Service for the 30 acres (120,000 m^{2}), which is located near Fenton Lake State Park.

== History ==
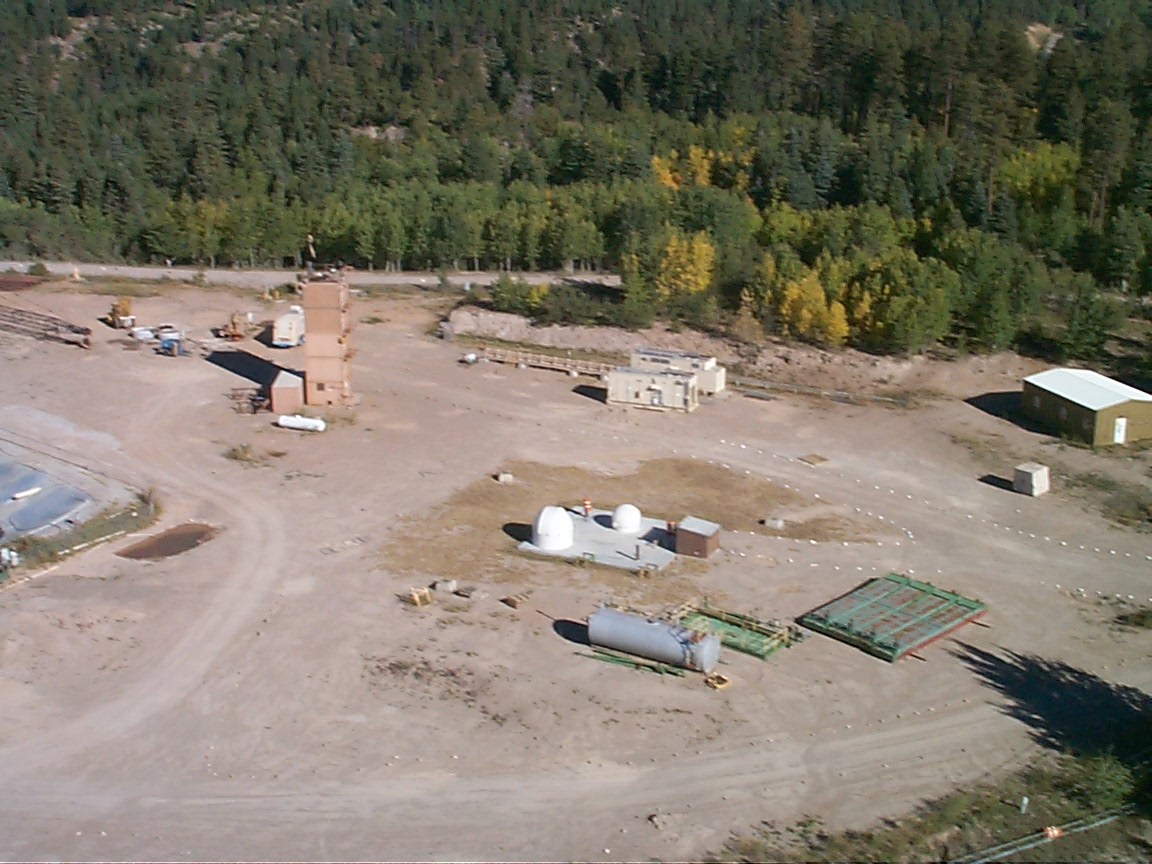
A view of the observatory site in 1998

The site was originally developed for a project in geothermal energy known as Hot Dry Rock, which was one of the first attempts at geothermal power. The project began in 1974 and was run intermittently until finally being terminated in 1995. At that time the site was set to be turned back to the United States Forest Service.

A number of potential users of the site at Los Alamos met in late 1995 to propose making Fenton Hill into a research station for astronomy, geosciences, and educational outreach programs. A Fenton Hill Observatory steering committee was formed from Los Alamos staff and potential outside users. The Los Alamos branch of the University of California Institute for Nuclear and Particle Astrophysics and Cosmology (INPAC) supported construction.

Los Alamos has a history of pioneering research in gamma ray bursts. In 1973 the Vela satellite, which was built by Los Alamos to monitor atmospheric nuclear tests, recorded brief bursts of gamma-rays of cosmic origin coming from random directions on the sky. Today, research and theories abound on what causes the bursts and where they come from, but they remain a mysterious astronomical phenomenon. The REACT telescope was the first gamma-ray telescope built at Fenton Hill. It received funding in July 1996 and was completed in 1998.

Fenton Hill Observatory ran the Earthwatch Student Challenge Awards Program, funded by the Durfee Foundation, during which eight highly talented high school students came and used portable telescopes, CCD cameras and computers to determine some of the astronomical characteristics of the Fenton Hill site and other potential sites in the Jemez Mountains, such as Pajarito Peak. The program ran for five summers between 1997 and 2001.

== REACT ==
REACT (Research and Education Automatically Controlled Telescope) was the first gamma-ray burst detection telescope built at Fenton Hill and was completed between 1997 and 1998. It has a half-degree field of view. When in event alert mode, REACT automatically swings around to take a series of one-minute exposures to catch any optical signals coinciding with gamma-ray transients detected by other instruments. It is fully automated and housed in a weather-sensing dome that automatically closes in the rain.

== ROTSE ==
The ROTSE-I telescope was part of the first phase of the Robotic Optical Transient Search Experiment, a worldwide collaboration. It has since been retired from use. The ROTSE-III telescope is designed to quickly observe gamma-ray bursts detected by satellites and other instruments. Its first response was on December 11, 2002. It consists of four 0.45-m robotic reflecting telescopes which together have a 15-degree field of view. ROTSE can use telemetry data from the NASA Compton Gamma Ray Observatory to direct its array of cameras toward burst events as they occur. Alerts will come from the BACODINE General Coordinates Network fast alert system developed at NASA/Goddard Space Flight Center. This system allows ROTSE to respond within 10 seconds of a burst onset.

== RAPTOR ==
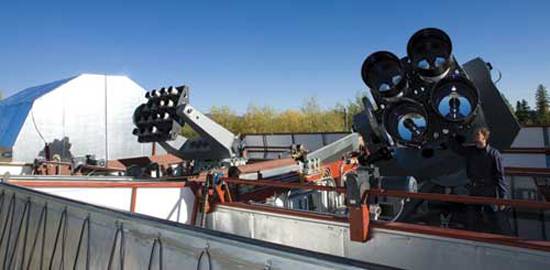
RAPTOR-K and RAPTOR-T

The RAPTOR system (Rapid Telescopes for Optical Response) is a specialized suite of robotic telescopes designed to detect and track transient objects, including gamma-ray bursts and near-Earth objects. RAPTOR was built by a Los Alamos team headed by astrophysicist Tom Vestrand. The system consists of six robotic observatories—RAPTOR-A, -S, -P, -K, and -T are located at Fenton Hill and RAPTOR-B is located at the Los Alamos Neutron Science Center, 38 miles (61 km) away. The telescopes are all networked and controlled by a centralized computer system. The older RAPTOR telescopes, RAPTORs A, B, S and P each consist of a wide-field telescope and a narrow-field telescope. They are mounted on platforms that can swivel to any point in the sky in less than 3 seconds, making them the fastest moving telescopes ever built. Each wide-field telescope has a nominal field of view of 38 by 38 degrees, which equates to being able to cover the sky in eleven patches. Each telescope is actually two telescopes giving stereoscopic vision. There is a zoom mechanism built into each telescope as well. While in monitoring mode, RAPTOR takes two consecutive 30-second exposures through its two wide-field telescopes and analyzes the resulting digital images. If it sees an interesting event, RAPTOR zooms in for a closer look with the two narrow-field telescopes.

The newest additions to the RAPTOR system are the RAPTOR-K and RAPTOR-T telescopes which began operation in 2008. The RAPTOR-K telescope contains 16 lenses and is capable of viewing most of the useful sky every 5 minutes. RAPTOR-T (T stands for technicolor) carries four co-aligned 0.4-meter telescopes with four different color filters. The purpose of RAPTOR-T is to detect changes in the intensity of different colors emitted during a gamma-ray burst. Information about the distance to the burst and about the burst's environment and dynamics can be obtained from such color information.

The RAPTOR project is now part of the Los Alamos Thinking Telescope Project, a larger project to develop software and hardware to manage the logistics of transient object detection. The RAPTOR project also led to SkyDOT, the Sky Database for Objects in Time-Domain.

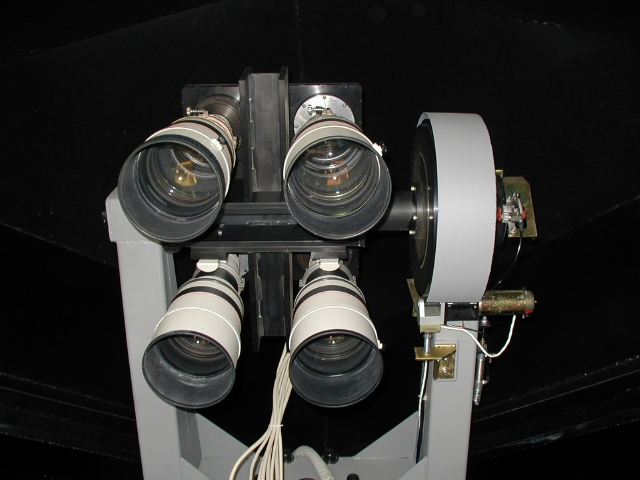
RAPTOR-P

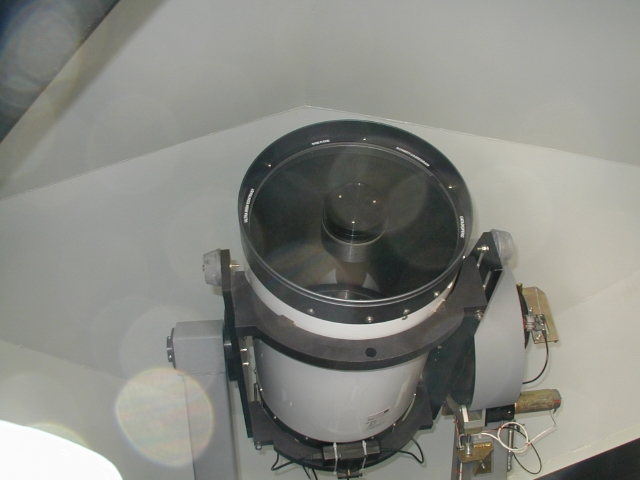
RAPTOR-S

== Milagro ==
The Milagro gamma-ray observatory is situated in a 5-million gallon pond that was originally used by the Hot Dry Rock project. It was designed to detect gamma rays but can also detect cosmic rays. The Milagro experiment uses 700 sensitive light detectors plus another 200 detectors arrayed around the pond. Milagro stopped taking data in April 2008 after seven years of operation.

== See also ==
- List of astronomical observatories
