= Department of Energy (United Kingdom) =

Defunct UK government department

Department overview
- Formed: 8 January 1974
- Preceding Department: Department of Trade and Industry
- Dissolved: 11 April 1992
- Superseding Department: Department of Trade and Industry (energy policy) Office of Gas Supply (gas market regulation) Office of Electricity Regulation (electricity market regulation) Department of the Environment (conservation and climate change)
- Jurisdiction: United Kingdom
- Headquarters: 1, Victoria Street, London
- Ministers responsible: Lord Carrington, Secretary of State of Energy (first); John Wakeham, Secretary of State of Energy (last)

The Department of Energy was a department of the United Kingdom Government. The department was established in January 1974, when the responsibility for energy production was transferred away from the Department of Trade and Industry in the wake of the 1973 oil crisis and with the importance of North Sea oil increasing.

Following the privatisation of the energy industries in the United Kingdom, which had begun some ten years earlier, the department was abolished in 1992. Many of its functions were abandoned, with the remainder being absorbed into other bodies or departments. The Office of Gas Supply (Ofgas) and the Office of Electricity Regulation (OFFER) took over market regulation, the Energy Efficiency Office was transferred to the Department of the Environment, and various media-related functions were transferred to the Department of National Heritage. The core activities relating to UK energy policy were transferred back to the Department of Trade and Industry (DTI).

The Department of Energy was a significant source of funding for energy research, and for investigations into the potential for renewable energy technologies in the UK. Work funded or part-funded by the department included investigations into Geothermal power and the Severn Barrage

== Ministers ==
=== Secretary of State for Energy ===
Colour key (for political parties):
Politicians: Conservative Labour

Secretary of State	Term of office		Political party	Ministry
Peter Carington, 6th Baron Carrington	8 January 1974	4 March 1974	Conservative	Edward Heath
Eric Varley MP for Chesterfield	5 March 1974	10 June 1975	Labour	Harold Wilson
Tony Benn MP for Chesterfield	10 June 1975	4 May 1979	Labour	Harold Wilson
Tony Benn MP for Chesterfield	10 June 1975	4 May 1979	Labour	James Callaghan
David Howell MP for Guildford	5 May 1979	14 September 1981	Conservative	Margaret Thatcher
Nigel Lawson MP for Blaby	14 September 1981	11 June 1983	Conservative	Margaret Thatcher
Peter Walker MP for Worcester	11 June 1983	13 June 1987	Conservative	Margaret Thatcher
Cecil Parkinson MP for Hertsmere	13 June 1987	24 July 1989	Conservative	Margaret Thatcher
John Wakeham MP for South Colchester and Maldon	24 July 1989	11 April 1992	Conservative	Margaret Thatcher
John Wakeham MP for South Colchester and Maldon	24 July 1989	11 April 1992	Conservative	John Major

Junior ministers included Peter Morrison (Minister of State in 1987) and Patrick Jenkin.

== Earlier and later ministries ==
Although only formed in 1974, the Department of Energy was not the first ministry to handle energy-related matters. The Ministry of Fuel and Power was created on 11 June 1942 from functions separated from the Board of Trade. It took charge of coal production, allocation of supplies of fuels, control of energy prices and petrol rationing during World War II.

The Ministry of Fuel and Power was renamed the Ministry of Power in January 1957. The Ministry of Power later became part of the Ministry of Technology on 6 October 1969, which merged into the Department of Trade and Industry on 20 October 1970.

The post of Secretary of State for Energy was re-created in 2008 as the Secretary of State for Energy and Climate Change.

== See also ==
- Energy use and conservation in the United Kingdom
- Secretary of State for Energy and Climate Change
