= United Downs =

Hamlet in Cornwall, England

Coordinates: 50.229°N 5.160°W

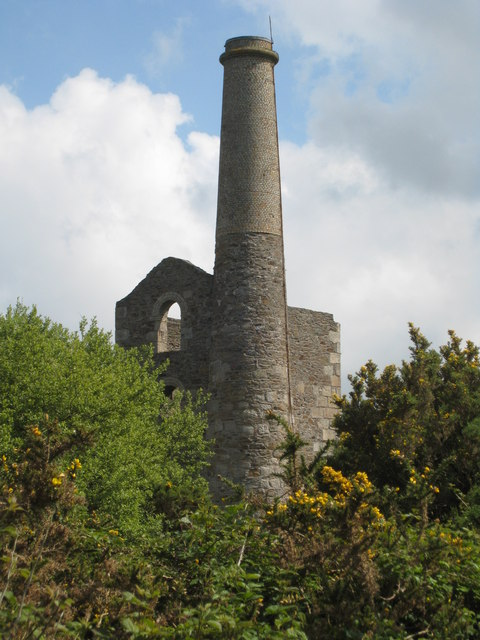
- An engine house at United Downs

- Location within Cornwall
- OS grid reference: SW747413
- Civil parish: Gwennap
- Unitary authority: Cornwall
- Ceremonial county: Cornwall
- Region: South West
- Country: England
- Sovereign state: United Kingdom

United Downs is a hamlet in the parish of Gwennap, Cornwall, England.

The hamlet is the site of the United Downs Deep Geothermal Power project, using heat from the earth to power up to 10,000 homes. There is an Industrial Park and Stock car racing track in the area.
