= Hot dry rock geothermal energy =

Extraction of heat from subterranean rocks

Hot dry rock (HDR) is an extremely abundant source of geothermal energy that is difficult to access. A vast store of thermal energy is contained within hot – but essentially dry and impervious crystalline basement rocks found almost everywhere deep beneath Earth's surface. A method for the extraction of useful amounts of geothermal energy from HDR originated at the Los Alamos National Laboratory in 1970, and Laboratory researchers were awarded a US patent covering it.

This technology has been tested extensively with multiple deep wells drilled in several field areas around world including the US, Japan, Australia, France, and the UK and investment of billions of research funds. It continues to be the focus, along with a related technique called Enhanced Geothermal System (EGS), for sizable government-led research studies involving costly deep drilling and rock studies. Thermal energy has been recovered in reasonably sustainable tests over periods of years and in some cases electrical power generation was also achieved. However no commercial projects are ongoing or likely due to the high cost and limited capacity of the engineered reservoirs, associated wells, and pumping systems. Commonly tests have opened just one or more fractures such that the reservoir surface heat exchange areas are limited. For this technology to successfully compete with other energy sources, drilling costs would have to drop drastically or new approaches that result in much more extensive, complex, and higher rate flow paths through actual fracture networks would have to be established. The enthusiasm in the research community is justified by the vast extent of the energy supply and the low environmental impact of the method, however significant breakthroughs will be required to make this a commercial energy resource.

== Overview ==
Although often confused with the relatively limited hydrothermal resource already commercialized to a large extent, HDR geothermal energy is very different. Whereas hydrothermal energy production can exploit hot fluids already in place in Earth's crust, an HDR system (consisting of the pressurized HDR reservoir, the boreholes drilled from the surface, and the surface injection pumps and associated plumbing) recovers Earth's heat from hot but dry regions via the closed-loop circulation of pressurized fluid. This fluid, injected from the surface under high pressure, opens pre-existing joints in the basement rock, creating a man-made reservoir which can be as much as a cubic kilometer in size. The fluid injected into the reservoir absorbs thermal energy from the high-temperature rock surfaces and then conveys the heat to the surface for practical use.

== History ==
The idea of deep hot dry rocks heat mining was described by Konstantin Tsiolkovsky (1898), Charles Parsons (1904), and Vladimir Obruchev (1920).

In 1963 in Paris, a geothermal heating system that used the heat of natural fractured rocks was built.

The Fenton Hill project was the first system for extracting HDR geothermal energy from an artificial formed reservoir; it was created in 1977.

== Technology ==
=== Planning and control ===
As the reservoir is formed by the pressure-dilation of the joints, the elastic response of the surrounding rock mass results in a region of tightly compressed, sealed rock at the periphery—making the HDR reservoir totally confined and contained. Such a reservoir is therefore fully engineered, in that the physical characteristics (size, depth at which it is created) as well as the operating parameters (injection and production pressures, production temperature, etc.) can be pre-planned and closely controlled. On the other hand the tight compression and confined nature of the reservoir severely limits that amount and the rate at which energy can be extracted.

=== Drilling and pressurization ===
As described by Brown, an HDR geothermal energy system is developed, first, by using conventional drilling to access a region of deep, hot basement rock. Once it has been determined the selected region contains no open faults or joints (by far the most common situation), an isolated section of the first borehole is pressurized at a level high enough to open several sets of previously sealed joints in the rock mass. By continuous pumping (hydraulic stimulation), a very large region of stimulated rock is created (the HDR reservoir) which consists of an interconnected array of joint flow paths within the rock mass. The opening of these flow paths causes movement along the pressure-activated joints, generating seismic signals (microearthquakes). Analysis of these signals yields information about the location and dimensions of the reservoir being developed.

=== Production wells ===
Typically, an HDR reservoir forms in the shape of an ellipsoid, with its longest axis orthogonal to the least principal Earth stress. This pressure-stimulated region is then accessed by two production wells, drilled to intersect the HDR reservoir near the elongated ends of the stimulated region. In most cases, the initial borehole becomes the injection well for the three-well, pressurized water-circulating system.

=== Operation ===
In operation, fluid is injected at pressures high enough to hold open the interconnected network of joints against the Earth stresses, and to effectively circulate fluid through the HDR reservoir at a high rate. During routine energy production, the injection pressure is maintained at just below the level that would cause further pressure-stimulation of the surrounding rock mass, in order to maximize energy production while limiting further reservoir growth. However, the limited reservoir size limits reservoir energy. Meanwhile high pressure operation adds significant cost to piping and pumping systems.

=== Productivity ===
The volume of the newly created array of opened joints within the HDR reservoir is much less than 1% of the volume of the pressure-stimulated rock mass. As these joints continue to pressure and cooling -dilate, the overall flow impedance across the reservoir is reduced, leading to a high thermal productivity. If the cooling leads to cooling fractures in a way that exposes more rock then it is possible that these reservoirs may improve over time. To date reservoir energy growth is only reported to come from new expensive high pressure well stimulation efforts.

== Feasibility studies ==
The feasibility of mining heat from the deep Earth was proven in two separate HDR reservoir flow demonstrations—each involving about one year of circulation—conducted by the Los Alamos National Laboratory between 1978 and 1995. These groundbreaking tests took place at the Laboratory's Fenton Hill HDR test site in the Jemez Mountains of north-central New Mexico, at depths of over 8,000 ft (2,400 m) and rock temperatures in excess of 180 °C. The results of these tests demonstrated conclusively the engineering viability of the revolutionary new HDR geothermal energy concept. The two separate reservoirs created at Fenton Hill are still the only truly confined HDR geothermal energy reservoirs flow-tested anywhere in the world. Although these tests demonstrated that HDR systems could be constructed, the flow rates and energy extractions rates did not justify the cost of the wells.

== Fenton Hill tests ==
=== Phase I ===
The first HDR reservoir tested at Fenton Hill, the Phase I reservoir, was created in June 1977 and then flow-tested for 75 days, from January to April 1978, at a thermal power level of 4 MW. The final water loss rate, at a surface injection pressure of 900 psi (6.2 MPa), was 2 US gallons per minute (7.6 L/min) (2% of the injection rate). This initial reservoir was shown to essentially consist of a single pressure-dilated, near-vertical joint, with a vanishingly small flow impedance of 0.5 psi/US gal/min (0.91 kPa/L/min).

The initial Phase I reservoir was enlarged in 1979 and further flow-tested for almost a year in 1980. Of greatest importance, this flow test confirmed that the enlarged reservoir was also confined, and exhibited a low water loss rate of 6 gpm. This reservoir consisted of the single near-vertical joint of the initial reservoir (which, as noted above, had been flow-tested for 75 days in early 1978) augmented by a set of newly pressure-stimulated near-vertical joints that were somewhat oblique to the strike of the original joint.

=== Phase II ===
A deeper and hotter HDR reservoir (Phase II) was created during a massive hydraulic fracturing (MHF) operation in late 1983. It was first flow-tested in the spring of 1985, by an initial closed-loop flow test (ICFT) that lasted a little over a month. Information garnered from the ICFT provided the basis for a subsequent long-term flow test (LTFT), carried out from 1992 to 1995.

The LTFT comprised several individual steady-state flow runs, interspersed with numerous additional experiments. In 1992–1993, two steady-state circulation periods were implemented, the first for 112 days and the second for 55 days. During both tests, water was routinely produced at a temperature of over 180 °C and a rate of 90–100 US gal/min (20–23 m^{3}/h), resulting in continuous thermal energy production of approximately 4 MW. Over this time span, the reservoir pressure was maintained (even during shut-in periods) at a level of about 15 MPa.

Beginning in mid-1993, the reservoir was shut in for a period of nearly two years and the applied pressure was allowed to drop to essentially zero. In the spring of 1995, the system was re-pressurized and a third continuous circulation run of 66 days was conducted. Remarkably, the production parameters observed in the two earlier tests were rapidly re-established, and steady-state energy production resumed at the same level as before. Observations during both the shut-in and operational phases of all these flow-testing periods provided clear evidence that the rock at the boundary of this man-made reservoir had been compressed by the pressurization and resultant expansion of the reservoir region.

As a result of the LTFT, water loss was eliminated as a major concern in HDR operations. Over the period of the LTFT, water consumption fell to just 7% of the quantity of water injected; and data indicated it would have continued to decline under steady-state circulation conditions. Dissolved solids and gases in the produced fluid rapidly reached equilibrium values at low concentrations (about one-tenth the salinity of sea water), and the fluid remained geochemically benign throughout the test period. Routine operation of the automated surface plant showed that HDR energy systems could be run using the same economical staffing schedules that a number of unmanned commercial hydrothermal plants already employ.

=== Test results ===
The Fenton Hill tests clearly demonstrated advantages of a fully engineered HDR reservoir over naturally occurring hydrothermal resources, including EGS. With all the essential physical characteristics of the reservoir—including rock volume, fluid capacity, temperature, etc.—established during the engineered creation of the reservoir zone, and the entire reservoir volume enclosed by a hyperstressed periphery of sealed rock, any variations in operating conditions are totally determined by intentional changes made at the surface. In contrast, a natural hydrothermal “reservoir”—which is essentially open and therefore unconfined(having boundaries that are highly variable)—is inherently subject to changes in natural conditions. On the other hand the less confined, more complex, lower pressure, and more pervasively fractured natural systems support much higher well flow rates and low cost development of energy generation.

Another advantage of an HDR reservoir is that its confined nature makes it highly suitable for load-following operations, whereby the rate of energy production is varied to meet the varying demand for electric power—a process that can greatly increase the economic competitiveness of the technology. This concept was evaluated near the end of the Phase II testing period, when energy production was increased by 60% for 4 hours each day, by a programmed vent-down of the high-pressure reservoir regions surrounding the production borehole. Within two days it became possible to computerize the process, such that production was automatically increased and decreased according to the desired schedule for the rest of the test period. The transitions between the two production levels took less than 5 minutes, and at each level steady-state production was consistently maintained. Such load-following operations could not be implemented in a natural hydrothermal system or even in an EGS system because of the unconfined volume and boundary conditions. Load following almost never improves economics for geothermal development because the fuel cost is effectively paid up front, so delaying use just hurts the economics. Normal geothermal systems have also (by necessity) been applied to follow loads but this kind of generation increases maintenance costs and generally reduces revenue (in spite of the higher prices for some of the load).

The experiments at Fenton Hill have clearly demonstrated that HDR technology is unique, not only with respect to how the pressurized reservoir is created and then circulated, but also because of the management flexibility it offers. It has in common with normal hydrothermal technology only that both are based on wells that produce hot water that runs generators.

== Soultz tests ==
In 1986 the HDR system project of France and Germany in Soultz-sous-Forêts was started. In 1991 wells were drilled to 2.2 km depth and were stimulated. However, the attempt to create a reservoir was unsuccessful as high water losses was observed.

In 1995 wells were deepened to 3.9 km and stimulated. A reservoir was created successfully in 1997 and a four-month circulation test with 25 L/s (6.6 USgal/s) flow rate without water loss was attained.

In 2003 wells were deepened to 5.1 km. Stimulations were done to create a third reservoir, during circulation tests in 2005-2008 water was produced at a temperature of about 160 °C with low water loss. Construction of a power plant was begun. The power plant started to produce electricity in 2016, it was installed with a gross capacity of 1.7 MW_{e}. The 1.7 MW test plant is purely a demonstration plant. In comparison normal geothermal power plant development typically involves initial plants from 10 to 100 MW. These plants can be commercially successful but are much cheaper than HDR system, with shallower wells, that produce orders of magnitude more energy, into inexpensive pipelines and power plants. It seems possible that breakthroughs will occur that allow us to access the tremendous amounts of stored heat energy in deep rock using HDR technology but very few breakthroughs appear to be on the horizon especially when compared to the rapid progress being made on much lower risk solar/battery combinations.

== Unconfirmed systems ==
There have been numerous reports of the testing of unconfined geothermal systems pressure-stimulated in crystalline basement rock: for instance at the Rosemanowes quarry in Cornwall, England; at the Hijiori and Ogachi calderas in Japan; and in the Cooper Basin, Australia. However, all these “engineered” geothermal systems, while developed under programs directed toward the investigation of HDR technologies, have proven to be open—as evidenced by the high water losses observed during pressurized circulation. In essence, they are all EGS or hydrothermal systems, not true HDR reservoirs.

== Related terminology ==
=== Enhanced geothermal systems ===
The EGS concept was first described by Los Alamos researchers in 1990, at a geothermal symposium sponsored by the United States Department of Energy (DOE)—many years before the DOE coined the term EGS in an attempt to emphasize the geothermal aspect of heat mining rather than the unique characteristics of HDR.

=== HWR versus HDR ===
Hot Wet Rock (HWR) hydrothermal technology makes use of hot fluids found naturally in basement rock; but such HWR conditions are rare. By far the bulk of the world's geothermal resource base (over 98%) is in the form of basement rock that is hot but dry—with no naturally available water. This means that HDR technology is applicable almost everywhere on Earth (hence the claim that HDR geothermal energy is ubiquitous). On the other hand an uneconomic resource is actually just energy storage and not useful.

Typically, the temperature in those vast regions of the accessible crystalline basement rock increases with depth. This geothermal gradient, which is the principal HDR resource variable, ranges from less than 20 °C/km to over 60 °C/km, depending upon location. The concomitant HDR economic variable is the cost of drilling to depths at which rock temperatures are sufficiently high to permit the development of a suitable reservoir. The advent of new technologies for drilling hard crystalline basement rocks, such as new PDC (polycrystalline diamond compact) drill bits, drilling turbines or fluid-driven percussive technologies (such as Mudhammer) may significantly improve HDR economics in the near future.

=== Possible confusion ===
As noted above, in the late 1990s the DOE began referring to all attempts to extract geothermal energy from basement rock as "EGS," which has led to both biographical and technical confusion. Biographically, a large number of publications exist that discuss work to extract energy from HDR without any mention of the term EGS. Thus, an internet search using the term EGS would not identify these publications.

But the technical distinction between HDR and EGS, as clarified in this article, may be even more important. Some sources describe the permeability of the Earth's basement rock as a continuum ranging from totally impermeable HDR to slightly permeable HWR to highly permeable conventional hydrothermal. However, this continuum concept is not technically correct. A more appropriate view would be to consider impermeable HDR rock as a separate state from that of the continuum of permeable rock—just as one would consider a completely closed faucet as distinct from one that is open to any degree, whether the flow be a trickle or a flood. In the same way, HDR technology should be regarded as totally distinct from EGS. Unfortunately it is not easy to open the faucet to obtain significant flow.

== Glossary ==
- DOE, Department of Energy (United States)
- EGS, Enhanced geothermal system
- HDR, Hot dry rock
- HWR, Hot wet rock
- ICFT, Initial closed-loop flow test
- LTFT, Long-term flow test
- MHF, Massive hydraulic fracturing
- PDC, Polycrystalline diamond compact (drill bit)
