= Solar power in the United Kingdom =

Solar power in United Kingdom
- Installed capacity: 21.5 GW (2025) (20th)
- Annual generation: 17.2 TWh (2025)
- Capacity per capita: 315 W (2025)
- Share of electricity: 6.4% (2025)

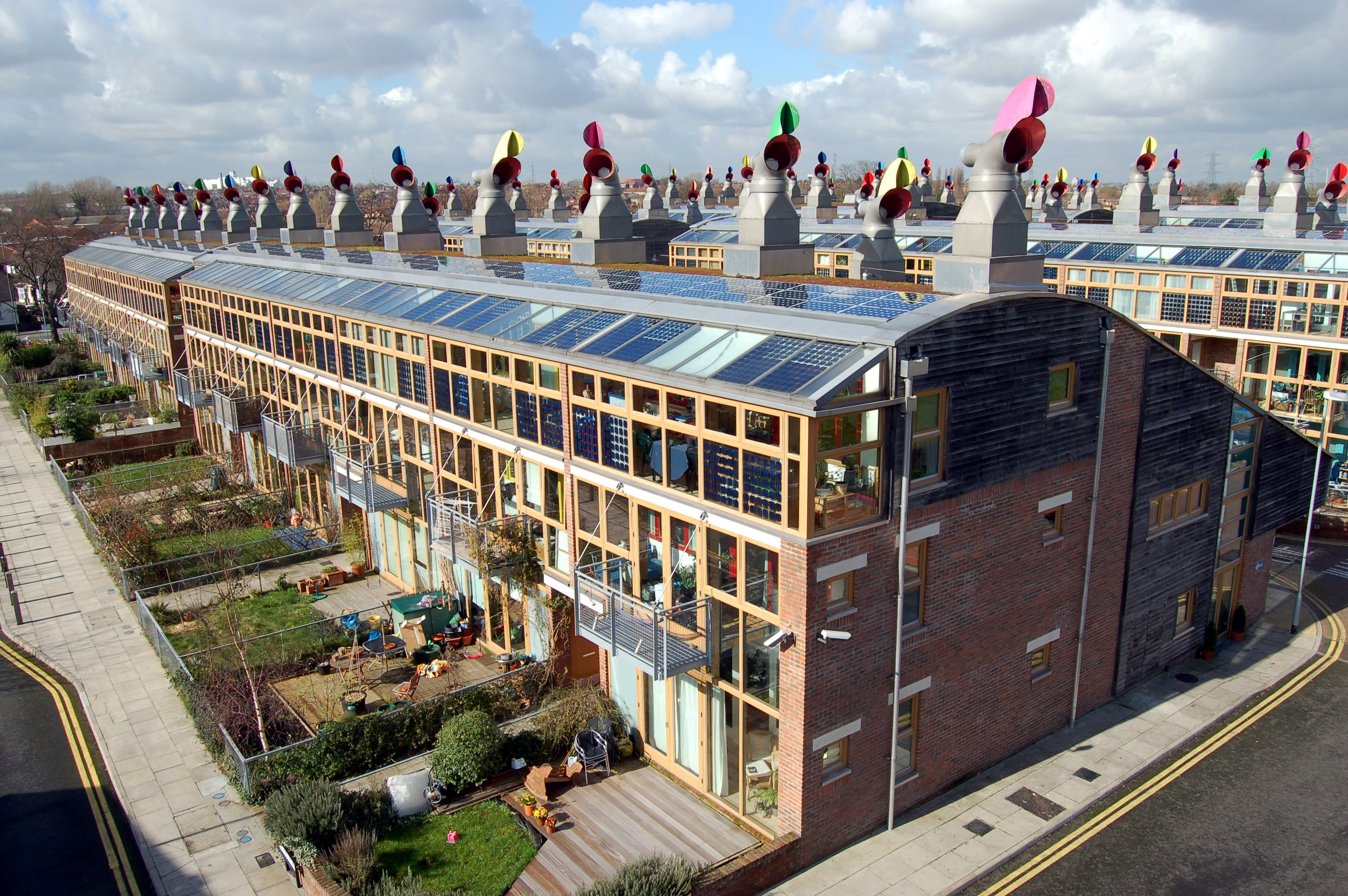
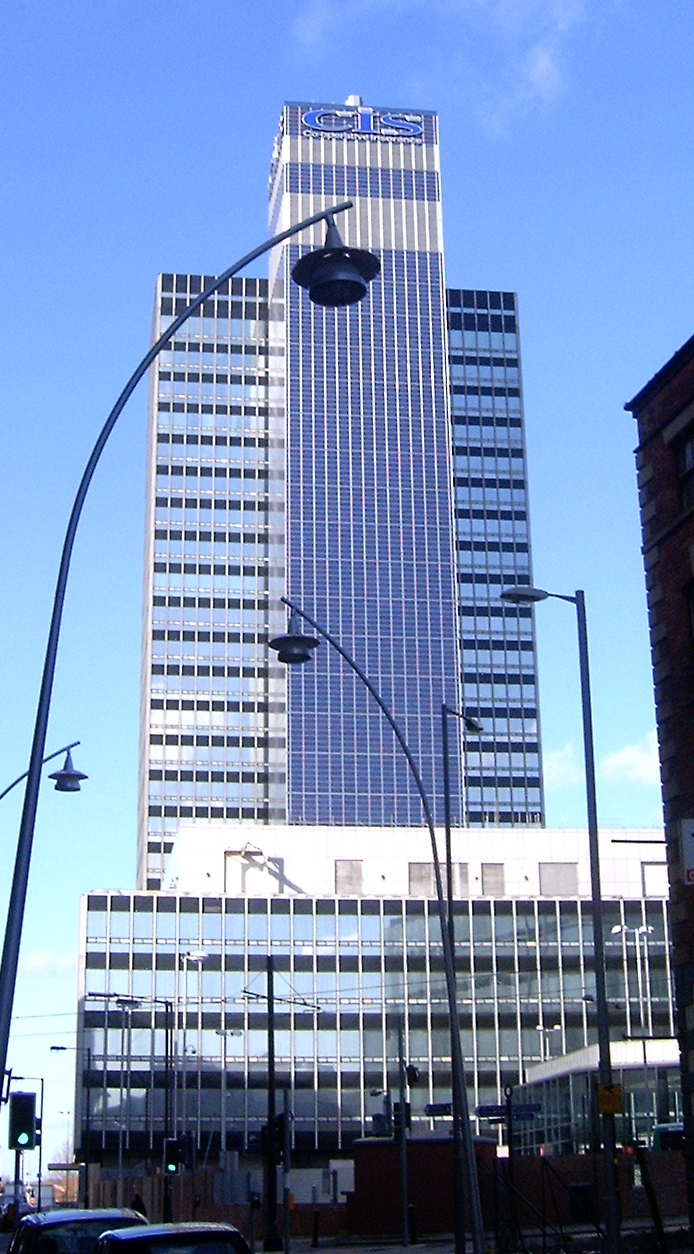
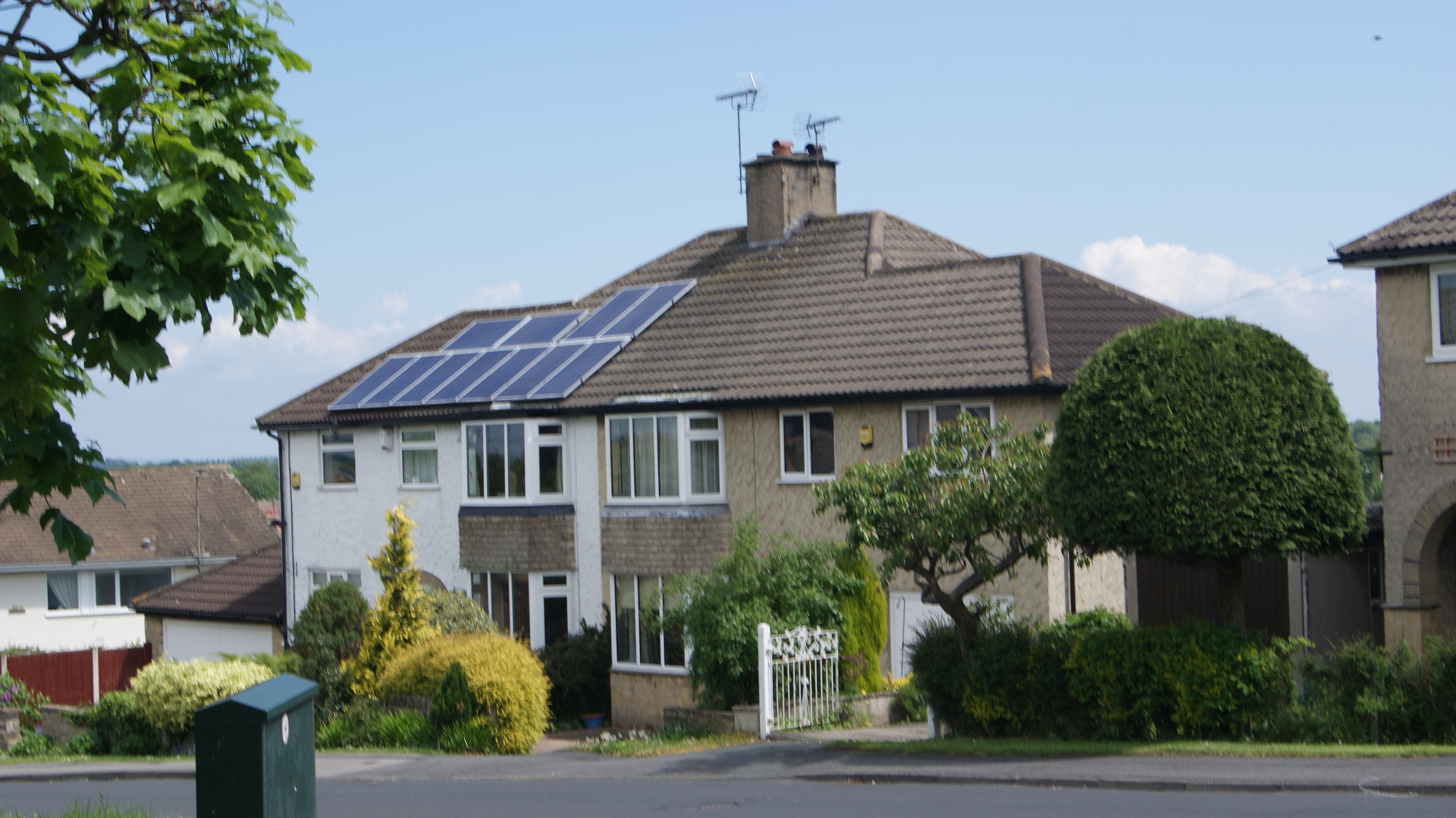
Top-left: solar panels on the BedZED development in the London Borough of Sutton. Bottom: residential rooftop solar PV in Wetherby, Leeds. Top-right: the CIS Tower was clad in building-integrated PV and connected to the grid in 2005.

Solar power has a growing role in electricity production in the United Kingdom, contributing around 6.4% of the UK's annual power generation in 2025. As of 2025, on sunny days, it provides over 30% of the UK's power consumption at times. Solar generation reached an all-time high of 15,420 MW at 13:00 on 23 April 2026.

There were few installations until 2010, when the UK government mandated subsidies in the form of a feed-in tariff (FIT), paid for by all electricity consumers. In the following years the cost of photovoltaic (PV) panels fell, and the FIT rates for new installations were reduced in stages until the scheme closed to new applications in 2019. The total installed capacity at the end of November 2025 was 21.5 GW, an increase of over 13% on the previous year.

PV panels have a capacity factor of around 10% in the UK climate (using 2025 figures above gives 9.1%). Home rooftop solar panels installed in 2022 were estimated to pay back their cost in ten to twenty years.

== Solar potential ==
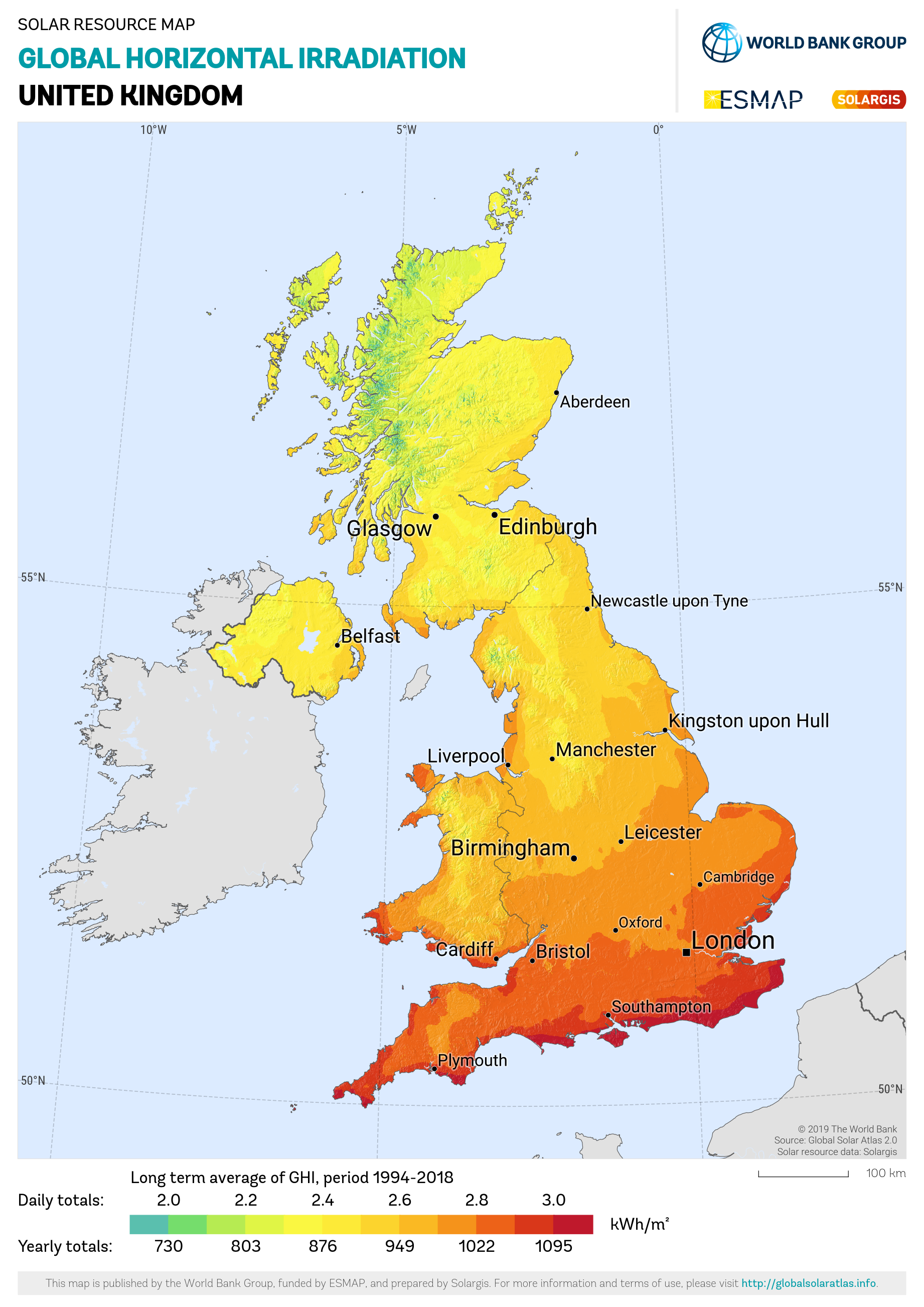
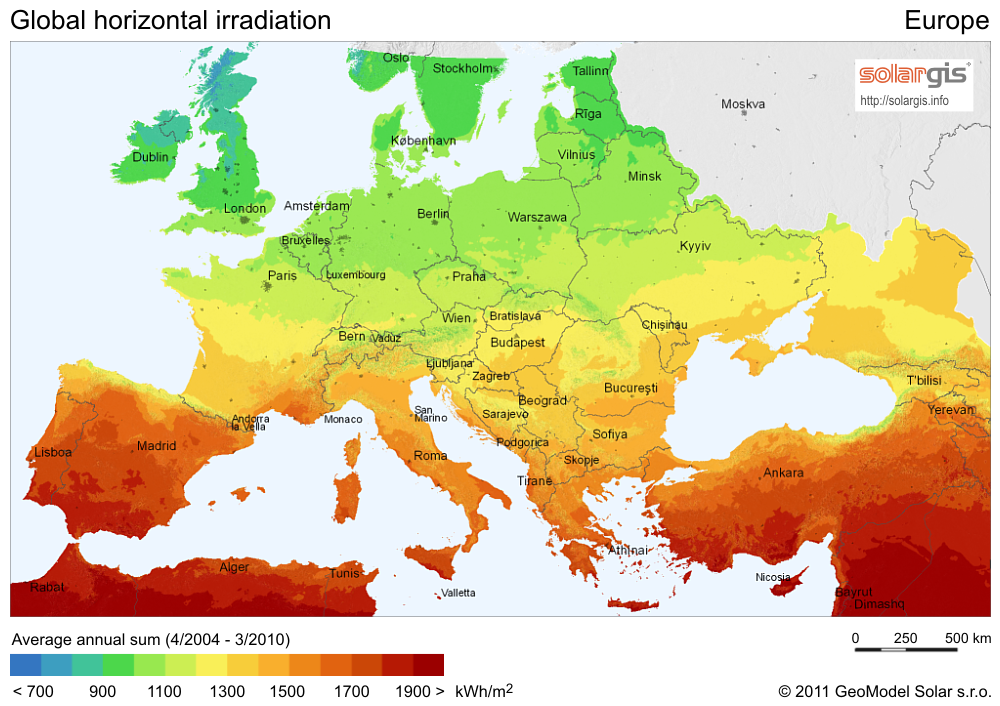
Solar potential in the UK and on the European continent (different colour scale)

The UK's annual insolation is in the range of 750–1,100 kilowatt-hours per square metre (kWh/m^{2}). London receives 0.52 and 4.74 kWh/m^{2} per day in December and July, respectively. While the sunniest parts of the UK receive much less solar radiation than the sunniest parts of Europe, the country's insolation in the south is comparable with that of central European countries, including Germany, which generates about 10.7% of its electricity from solar power. Additionally, the UK's higher wind speeds cool PV modules, leading to higher efficiencies than could be expected at these levels of insolation. Capacity factors of solar PV reached values between 9.8% and 11.4% in the UK in the 2013-2022 period.

Derry Newman, chief executive of Solarcentury, argues that the UK's "famously overcast weather does not make it an unsuitable place for solar power, as solar panels work on daylight, not necessarily direct sunlight." Some solar cells work better in direct sunlight, others can use more diffuse light. While insolation rates are lower in England than France and Spain, they are still usable.

== Solar PV installed capacity and generation ==
Year end	Capacity (MW)	Generation (GW·h)	Effective capacity factor (Note: 0.108 here means 10.8% for example. For more information on calculations see capacity factor)	% of total electricity consumption
2008	22	17	0.088	<0.01
2009	27	20	0.085	<0.01
2010	95	33	0.040	0.01
2011	965	244	0.029	0.07
2012	1,736	1,354	0.089	0.37
2013	2,822	2,010	0.081	0.64
2014	5,378	4,054	0.086	1.2
2015	9,118	7,533	0.094	2.2
2016	11,562	10,395	0.103	3.1
2017	12,690	11,457	0.103	3.4
2018	12,992	12,736	0.112	3.8
2019	13,265	12,418	0.107	3.8
2020	13,579	12,903	0.109	4.1
2021	13,965	12,138	0.099	3.9
2022	14,660	13,921	0.108	4.3
2023	16,238	13,884	0.098	4.7
2024	17,848	14,789	0.095	5.2
2025	21,481	17,180	0.091	6.4

Solar PV deployment in the UK. Capacity in megawatts (MW_{p}).
Source: DECC – Department of Energy & Climate Change, Statistics – Solar photovoltaics deployment (period from 2010 onward)

The table above shows electricity production from solar panels as a percentage of the final consumption of electricity in the UK and not gross supply to the grid. These numbers may be updated as the UK government has an average time lag of around 6 months in completing the backlog of officially processing the large number of solar installations.

=== Area covered by solar panels ===
As of September 2024, around 0.1% of the UK was covered by ground-mounted solar panels, equating to around 52,000 acres (21,000 hectares).

=== Solar PV by size of installations ===
Cumulative installed capacity (MW)
Size	Dec 2018	Dec 2019	Dec 2020	Dec 2021	Dec 2022	Dec 2023	Dec 2024	Dec 2025
0 to < 4 kW	1,989.9	2,072.9	2,119.0	2,204.0	2,383.7	2,605.9	2,855.3	3,203.3
4 to < 10 kW	874.6	930.1	982.6	1,082.5	1,412.5	1,980.4	2,428.6	3,001.9
10 to < 50 kW	790.1	868.7	907.4	960.1	1,052.2	1,243.4	1,442.6	1,703.6
50 kW to < 5 MW	3,543.9	3,597.9	3,629.0	3,660.2	3,744.8	3,833.1	3,911.1	3,990.9
5 to < 25 MW	4,462.2	4,469.4	4,519.6	4,556.6	4,698.6	4,990.9	5,157.1	5,277.2
> 25 MW	1,508.3	1,543.0	1,636.2	1,793.1	1,833.1	2,883.6	3,622.5	4,892.5
Total	13,183.6	13,496.5	13,808.4	14,271.1	15,139.5	17,552.0	19,431.7	22,084.0
Pre-2009 estimate (for comparison)	14.6							

== History ==
PV capacity in watts per capita by region in 2013: 0–1 watt 1–10 watts 10–50 watts / 50–100 watts 100–200 watts 200–350 watts

In 2006, the United Kingdom had installed about 12 MW of photovoltaic capacity, which represented only 0.3% of total European solar PV of 3,400 MW. In August 2006, there was widespread news coverage in the United Kingdom of the major high street electrical retailers Currys' decision to stock PV modules, manufactured by Sharp, at a cost of £1,000 per module. The retailer also provided an installation service.

Solar power installations increased rapidly in subsequent years, as a result of reductions in the cost of PV panels, and the introduction of a feed-in-tariff (FiT) subsidy in April 2010.

FiT payments for new installations were cut, in a review announced by DECC on 9 June 2011. As a result, large arrays of solar panels became a less attractive investment opportunity for developers, especially for projects greater than 250 kW, so large field arrays such as these were less likely to be built beyond the 1 August 2011 cut-off date. At the end of 2011, there were 230,000 solar power projects in the UK, with a total installed generating capacity of 750 MW.

In 2012, the government announced that 4 million homes across the UK would be powered by the sun within eight years, representing 22 gigawatts (GW) of installed solar power capacity by 2020. At the end of September 2013, retailer IKEA announced that solar panel packages for houses would be sold at 17 UK stores by July 2014. The decision followed a successful pilot project at their Thurrock store, during which one system was sold almost every day. The panels were manufactured by the Chinese company Hanergy. The partnership did not last and in October 2015 IKEA ended its relationship with Hanergy.

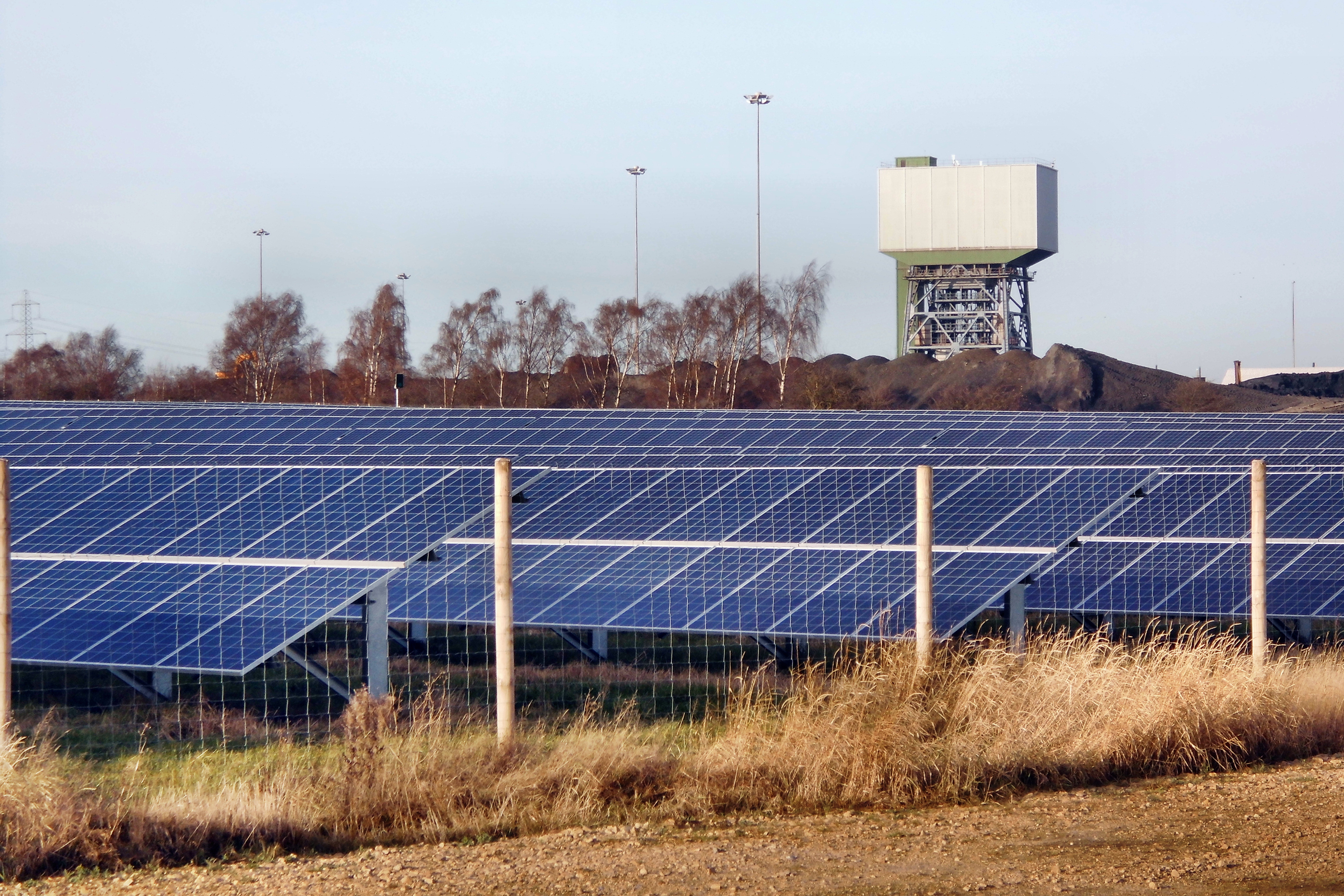
A colliery seen behind a solar farm in North Yorkshire in 2017

By 2016 the total installed capacity was over 10,000 MW. In the summer half-year from April to September 2016, UK solar panels produced more electricity (6,964 GWh) than did coal power (6,342 GWh); each meeting about 5% of demand.

UK solar PV installed capacity at the end of 2017 was 12.8 GW, representing a 3.4% share of total electricity generation. Provisionally, as of the end of January 2019 there was 13,123 MW installed UK solar capacity across 979,983 installations. This is an increase of 323 MW in slightly more than a year. A new record peak generation from photovoltaics was set at 14.0 GW on 8 July 2025.

New solar PV installations slowed in 2020, though to a lesser extent, with 217 MW being added in 2020 compared with 273 MW in 2019. COVID-19 restrictions may have caused delays in some projects.

2022 saw a big increase in domestic installations with over 130,000 installations added in the 10 kW or less range, to take the total number of these small-scale installations to 1,179,495. Total capacity as of February 2023 stood at 14,432 MW, with an average of 72 MW added each month over the previous six months.

The UK Government report on solar photovoltaic deployment for November 2025 notes the following:

"After a sharp drop in April 2020 due to Covid-19 lockdown measures, the number of installations recovered by the second half of 2020 and gradually exceeded pre-pandemic levels. Between the closure of [the Renewables Obligation scheme] to new entrants in 2016 and 2021, the median number of new monthly installations was around 3,000 per month. The median over the past 12 months is over 22,000 installations per month.

The bulk of Solar PV installations in the UK are domestic but they only account for 29% of the total capacity. Domestic's share of capacity dropped rapidly after the first years of FiT and has remained around 25% since 2016. It has crept back up over the last two years, driven by a surge in solar PV installations. In November 2025, 63% of the new schemes were installed on a residential building, adding a total of 72 MW.

2025 has already broken the record for the most installations in any calendar year, with 244,000 in the eleven months to date. This record is set to increase when December figures are published in January. There has already been 2.5 GW of capacity installed in 2025, this is also one of the highest figures on record but it likely to stay behind the record of 4.3 GW set in 2015.

At the end of November 2025, at least 38% of capacity (8.2 GW) came from ground-mounted or standalone solar installations. This includes 19 operational solar farms accredited on Contracts for Difference, 17 of which have come online during 2025, this number is expected to increase. In addition, around half of the "unaccredited" capacity is believed to be ground mount so that in total, ground-mount accounts for roughly 58% of total capacity."

== Rooftop solar ==
As of 2025 about 31% of installed capacity is residential. By 2027 solar will be required on almost all new homes in England.

According to a report on behalf of the European Commission, in 2015 the United Kingdom had 2,499 MW of residential solar PV capacity, with 775,000 residential solar PV producers, representing 2.7% of households. The average size of residential solar PV systems was estimated to be 3.25 kW, and the technical potential for residential solar PV in the United Kingdom was estimated at 41,636 MW.

MCS (Microgeneration Certification Scheme) claim 61,320 UK properties had solar panels installed in 2021, an increase of 71% on the previous year. The average payback time for residential solar PV in the UK was 11.4 years as of 2015, but subsequent increases in the price of domestic energy have significantly decreased this. The April 2022 rise in the price cap saw payback times reduced on average by 2.5 years.

Some of the advantages of small scale residential solar include eliminating the need for extra land, keeping cost saving advantages in local communities and empowering households to become producer/consumers of renewable electricity, raising awareness of wasteful consumption habits and environmental issues through direct experience. It will take anything from 4 to 20 years to recoup the money spent on solar panels, this depends on a number of factors for example how many modules are installed, how big they are, if they are south facing, and the location. Some studies have found that feed in tariff schemes have disproportionately benefited wealthier households with little or no assistance to help poorer household access financial loans or affordable schemes, whilst the costs of schemes are distributed evenly across utility bills.

In his Spring Statement of March 2022, Chancellor Rishi Sunak announced a reduction of VAT on the installation of energy-saving materials (including solar PV systems) to 0% (previously 5%) for a period of five years from 1 April 2022, stating "the measure is intended to incentivise the take-up of ESMs in line with the government's net zero objectives".

=== Planning considerations ===
Adding solar panels to the external elevations and roofs of a dwelling will change the appearance of both the property and the local street view. This in some cases will require planning permission from the local authority. For a Listed Building or in a Conservation Area, planning permission is mandatory. Otherwise, the owner of a domestic dwelling where solar panels are being installed can in most cases proceed under their Permitted Development rights, as long as certain height limitations are adhered to.

== Large-scale solar farms ==
No.	Name	Capacity (MW)	County	Country	Status	Operating since
1	Botley West Solar Farm	840	Oxfordshire	England	Rejected	
2	Great North Road Solar and Biodiversity Park	800	Nottinghamshire	England	Approved	
3	Springwell Solar Farm	800	Lincolnshire	England	Approved	
4	Meridian Solar Farm	750	Lincolnshire	England	Proposed	
5	Whitestone Solar Farm	750	South Yorkshire	England	Proposed	
6	One Earth Solar Farm	740	Nottinghamshire	England	Approved	
7	High Grove Solar Farm	720	Norfolk	England	Proposed	
8	Cottam Solar Project	600	Lincolnshire	England	Approved	
9	Leoda Solar Farm	500–600	Lincolnshire	England	Proposed	
10	Droves Solar Farm	500	Norfolk	England	Proposed	
11	East Pye Solar	500	Norfolk	England	Proposed	
12	Gate Burton - Solar & Energy Storage Park	500	Lincolnshire	England	Approved	
13	Green Hill Solar Farm	500	Northamptonshire	England	Approved	
14	Heckington Fen Solar Park	500	Lincolnshire	England	Approved	
15	Kingsway Solar Farm	500	Cambridgeshire	England	Proposed	
16	Light Valley Solar	500	North Yorkshire	England	Proposed	
17	Lime Down Solar	500	Wiltshire	England	Proposed	
18	Sunnica Energy Farm (East and West)	500	Cambridgeshire	England	Approved	
19	Tillbridge Solar Farm	500	Lincolnshire	England	Approved	
20	West Burton Solar Project	480	Lincolnshire	England	Approved	
21	Steeple Renewables Project	450	Nottinghamshire	England	Approved	
22	Beacon Fen Energy Park	400	Lincolnshire	England	Proposed	
23	East Yorkshire Solar Farm	400	East Riding of Yorkshire	England	Approved	
24	Future Energy Llanwern	400	Newport	Wales	Proposed	
25	Longfield Solar Energy Farm	400	Essex	England	Approved	
26	Cleve Hill Solar Park	373	Kent	England	Operational	2025 (July)
27	Maen Hir Solar	360	Isle of Anglesey	Wales	Proposed	
28	Amlwch / Llyn Alaw	350	Anglesey	Wales	Proposed	
29	Mallard Pass Solar Farm	350	Lincolnshire	England	Approved	
30	Kingfisher Solar Farm	320	East Riding of Yorkshire	England	Proposed	
31	Peartree Hill Solar Farm	320	East Riding of Yorkshire	England	Approved	
32	EcoPower Suffolk	250	Suffolk	England	Proposed	
33	Fenwick Solar Farm	237.5	South Yorkshire	England	Proposed	
34	Shepway Energy Park	200	Kent	England	Proposed	
35	Helios Renewable Energy Project	190	North Yorkshire	England	Approved	
36	Byers Gill Solar Farm	180	County Durham	England	Approved	
37	Dean Moor Solar Farm	150	Cumbria	England	Approved	
38	Little Crow Solar Park	150	Lincolnshire	England	Approved	
39	Oaklands Farm Solar Park	138	Derbyshire	England	Approved	
40	Wentlooge Renewable Energy Hub	125	Gwent	Wales	Proposed	
41	Frodsham solar farm	100	Cheshire	England	Approved	
42	Stonestreet Green Solar	99.9	Kent	England	Approved	
43	Hedgehog Grove Solar Farm	98	Essex	England	Proposed	
44	Llanwern Solar farm	75	Newport	Wales	Operational	2021
45	Shotwick solar farm	72	Flintshire	Wales	Operational	2016
46	West Raynham Solar Farm	49.9	Norfolk	England	Operational	2015
47	The Grange solar farm	49.9	Nottinghamshire	England	Operational	2021
48	Larks Green Solar Farm	49.9	Gloucestershire	England	Operational	2023
49	Melksham Solar Farm	49.6	Wiltshire	England	Operational	2016

The first solar park in Wales became operational in 2011 at Rhosygilwen, north Pembrokeshire.

On 13 July 2011, construction of the largest solar park in the United Kingdom was completed in Newark-on-Trent in Nottinghamshire. The 4.9 MW free-field system was built in just seven weeks after being granted planning permission. The system generates an estimated 4,860 MWh of electricity (an average power of 560 kW) into the national grid each year. There are several other examples of 4–5 MW field arrays of photovoltaics in the UK, including the 5 MW Langage Solar Park, the 5 MW Westmill Solar Farm, the 4.51 MW Marsten Solar Farm and Toyota's 4.6 MW plant in Burnaston, Derbyshire.

The first large solar farm in the United Kingdom, a 32 MW solar farm, began construction in November 2012 in Leicestershire, between the runways of the former military airfield, Wymeswold.

As of June 2014 there were 18 schemes generating more than 5 MW and 34 in planning or construction in Wales.

In 2023, the queue for grid connection was a problem.

== Government programmes ==
The Energy Saving Trust that administers government grants for domestic photovoltaic systems, the Low Carbon Building Programme, estimated in 2008 that an installation for an average-sized house would cost between £5,000 and £8,000, with most domestic systems usually between 1.5 and 3 kWp, and yield annual savings between £150 and £200.

Also around 2008, the Green Energy for Schools programme was intended to provide 100 schools across the UK with solar panels. The first school in Wales was at Tavernspite, in Pembrokeshire, and received panels worth £20,000.

In 2025, the Labour government indicated that most new-build homes would soon be required to have solar panels. At the same time, 45–47 GW of solar generation was stated as the goal for 2030, through installations on homes and car parking.

=== Feed-in tariff ===
Discussion on implementation of a feed-in tariff programme concluded on 26 September 2008, and the results were published in 2009. The UK government agreed in April 2010 to pay for all grid-connected generated electricity at an initial rate of up to 41.3 pence (US$0.67) per kWh, whether used locally or exported. The rates proved more attractive than necessary, and in August 2011, were drastically reduced for installations over 50 kW, a policy change criticised as marking "the end of the UK's solar industry as we know it". Subsequently, feed-in tariff rates were adjusted annually by the government, and a requirement was introduced for new claims that the home's rating on the Energy Performance Certificate (EPC) had to be 'D' or better. The amount of electricity exported is not usually measured for domestic installations; instead it is calculated by assuming that 50% of the electricity produced is exported into the grid.

The Department for Business, Energy and Industrial Strategy published a consultation on 19 July 2018, stating their intention to close the FIT scheme to new applicants from 1 April 2019 and not replace it with a new subsidy. The Feed-in Tariff was closed to new entries on 1 April 2019, but households are still able to claim on existing tariffs where available.

=== Smart Export Guarantee ===
On 10 June 2019, Ofgem announced that BEIS had introduced the Smart Export Guarantee (SEG), in force from 1 January 2020. This is not a direct replacement of the feed-in tariff scheme, but rather an initiative that rewards solar generators for electricity exported to the grid. Energy suppliers with more than 150,000 domestic customers must provide at least one export tariff. The export tariff rate must be greater than zero. Export is measured by smart meters which the energy supplier will install free of charge.

The SEG is available to households that generate up to 5 MW from solar PV, wind, micro-combined heat and power, hydro or anaerobic digestion.

=== Contracts for Difference ===
The Contracts for Difference (CfD) scheme, introduced in 2013 to replace the Renewables Obligation, excluded solar PV schemes from the competitive auctions in 2015. The majority of successful CfD auction bidders came from the wind sector. In 2020 the UK government reversed this decision, opening the door for PV projects to compete in the CfD auctions against onshore wind projects.

== Future ==
Decentralised smaller scale generators which are not connected directly to the transmission network are forecast to increase. New solar farms and battery storage may help to meet increased demand from electric vehicles.

== See also ==
- Renewable energy in the United Kingdom
- Renewable energy in Scotland
- Energy use and conservation in the United Kingdom
- Energy policy of the United Kingdom
- Green electricity in the United Kingdom
- Solar energy in the European Union
- Renewable energy by country
- UK-ISES
- United Kingdom National Renewable Energy Action Plan
