= Renewable energy in the United Kingdom =

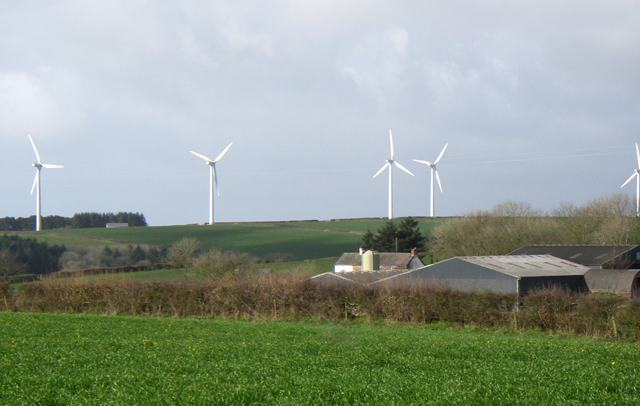
Onshore wind is a major renewable electricity source in the United Kingdom (wind farm in Wales).

Renewable energy in the United Kingdom refers to energy from renewable sources used for electricity generation, heat and transport in the United Kingdom. In 2024, renewables accounted for 50.4% of UK electricity generation and 16.2% of gross final energy consumption.

Renewable electricity is dominated by wind, with generation from bioenergy, solar power and hydroelectricity contributing less. Renewable heat comes mainly from biomass and heat pumps, and renewable transport energy is supplied mainly through biofuels, with a smaller contribution from renewable electricity used in transport.

Support for renewable electricity has shifted from the Renewables Obligation and Feed-in Tariffs to auctioned Contracts for Difference (CfD) for new large-scale generation and the Smart Export Guarantee for small generators. Renewable transport fuels are supplied under the Renewable Transport Fuel Obligation. Distributed generation is dominated by small-scale solar photovoltaics, and community energy is supported through national and devolved programmes. Costs include technology costs and CfD strike prices, and the network, connection and balancing costs of integrating variable renewables.

Raw data

== Overview ==
The United Kingdom uses renewable energy sources for electricity generation, heating and transport fuels. Official statistics report renewable electricity as a share of generation and renewables as a share of overall energy consumption on a gross final consumption basis.

In 2024, renewables generated 143.7 TWh and provided 50.4% of UK electricity generation. Renewables were 16.2% of gross final energy consumption. Renewable electricity generating capacity increased by 4.1 GW (7.3%) during the year.

In 2024, around 73% of renewable fuel demand was allocated to electricity generation, with heat accounting for 17%, transport 9.4%, and grid-injected biogas 2.3%. Renewables' share of final energy consumption was 27.6% in industry, 25.0% for other final users, 17.0% for the domestic sector and 6.2% for transport, reflecting differences in electrification and direct use of renewable fuels between sectors.

Raw data

== History ==
Heat from wood fires goes back to the earliest human habitation of Britain.

Waterwheel technology was imported by the Romans, with sites in Ikenham and Willowford in England being from the 2nd century AD. At the time of the Domesday Book (1086), there were 5,624 watermills in England alone, almost all of them located by modern archaeological surveys, which suggest a higher of 6,082, with many others likely unrecorded in the northern reaches of England. By 1300, this number had risen to between 10,000 and 15,000.

Windmills first appeared in Europe during the Middle Ages. The earliest reliable reference to a windmill in Europe (assumed to have been of the vertical type) dates from 1185, in the former village of Weedley in Yorkshire, at the southern tip of the Wold overlooking the Humber Estuary. The first electricity-generating wind turbine was a battery charging machine installed in July 1887 by Scottish academic James Blyth to light his holiday home in Marykirk, Scotland.

In 1878, the world's first hydroelectric power scheme was developed at Cragside in Northumberland, England by William George Armstrong. It was used to power a single arc lamp in his art gallery.

However, almost all electricity generation thereafter was based on burning coal. In 1964, coal accounted for 88% of electricity, and oil for 11%. The remainder was mostly hydroelectric power, which continued to grow its share as coal struggled to meet demand. The world's third pumped-storage hydroelectric power station, the Cruachan Dam in Argyll and Bute, Scotland, came on line in 1967. The Central Electricity Generating Board attempted to experiment with wind energy on the Llŷn Peninsula in Wales during the 1950s, but this was shelved after local opposition.

=== Modern era ===
Total electricity supplied (net) 1920 to 2024 in Great Britain, showing a reduction following the 2008 financial crisis alongside the improving efficiency of electrical devices, such as LED lamps

Renewable energy experienced a turning point in the 1970s, with the 1973 oil crisis, the 1972 miners' strike, growing environmentalism, and wind energy development in the United States exerting pressure on the government. In 1974, the Central Policy Review Staff recommended that 'the first stage of a full technical and economic appraisal of harnessing wave power for electricity generation should be put in hand at once.' Wave power was seen to be the future of the nation's energy policy, and solar, wind, and tidal schemes were dismissed as 'impractical'. Nevertheless, an alternative energy research centre was opened in Harwell, although it was criticised for favouring nuclear power. By 1978, four wave energy generator prototypes had been designed which were later deemed too expensive. The Wave Energy Programme closed in the same year.

During this period, there was a large increase in installations of solar thermal collectors to heat water. In 1986, Southampton began pumping heat from a geothermal borehole through a district heating network. Over the years, several combined heat and power (CHP) engines and backup boilers for heating have been added, along with absorption chillers and backup vapour compression machines for cooling.

In 1987 a 3.7 MW demonstration wind turbine on Orkney began supplying electricity to homes, the largest in Britain at the time. Privatisation of the energy sector in 1989 ended direct governmental research funding. Two years later the UK's first onshore windfarm was opened in Delabole, Cornwall: ten turbines producing enough energy for 2,700 homes. This was followed by the UK's first offshore windfarm in North Hoyle, Wales.

The share of renewables in the country's electricity generation has risen from below 2% in 1990 to 14.9% in 2013, helped by subsidy and falling costs. Introduced on 1 April 2002, the Renewables Obligation requires all electricity suppliers who supply electricity to end consumers to supply a set portion of their electricity from eligible renewables sources; a proportion that would increase each year until 2015 from a 3% requirement in 2002–2003, via 10.4% in 2010–2012 up to 15.4% by 2015–2016. The UK Government announced in the 2006 Energy Review an additional target of 20% by 2020–21. For each eligible megawatt hour of renewable energy generated, a tradable certificate called a Renewables obligation certificate (ROC) is issued by Ofgem.

In 2007, the United Kingdom Government agreed to an overall European Union target of generating 20% of the EU's energy supply from renewable sources by 2020. Each EU member state was given its own allocated target; for the United Kingdom it was 15%. This was formalised in January 2009 with the passage of the EU Renewables Directive. As renewable heat and fuel production in the United Kingdom were at extremely low bases, RenewableUK estimated that this would require 35–40% of the UK's electricity to be generated from renewable sources by that date, to be met largely by 33–35 GW of installed wind capacity. The 2008 Climate Change Act consists of a commitment to reducing net Greenhouse Gas Emissions by 80% by 2050 (on 1990 levels) and an intermediate target reduction of 26% by 2020.

The Green Deal was UK government policy from 2012 to 2015. It permitted loans for energy saving measures for properties in Great Britain to enable consumers to benefit from energy efficient improvements to their home.

In 2013, renewable sources provided 14.9% of the electricity generated in the United Kingdom, reaching 53.7 TWh of electricity generated. In the second quarter of 2015, renewable electricity generation exceeded 25% and exceeded coal generation for the first time.

In 2013, renewable sources accounted for 5.2% of all energy produced, using the methodology of the 2009 Renewables Directive. By 2015, this had risen to 8.3%.

In June 2017, for the first time renewables plus nuclear generated more UK power than gas and coal together. Britain had the fourth greenest power generation in Europe and the seventh worldwide. In that year, new offshore wind power became cheaper than new nuclear power for the first time.

Government figures for December 2020 showed renewable sources generated 41.4% of the electricity produced in the UK, being around 6% of total UK energy usage. Q4 2022 statistics were similar, with low carbon electricity generation (which includes nuclear) at 57.9 per cent of total electricity generation (same as Q4 2021).

From 2020, a rapid expansion of grid scale battery storage took place, helping to cope with the variability in wind and solar power. As of May 2021, 1.3 GW of grid storage batteries was active, along with the earlier pumped storage at Dinorwig, Cruachan and Ffestiniog.

== Policy, targets and support schemes ==
UK renewable energy policy is shaped by statutory climate targets and uses support schemes and obligations across electricity, heat and transport. The UK has a legally binding target to reduce the net UK carbon account by 100% by 2050 compared with the 1990 baseline. The UK government has stated an aim to fully decarbonise the electricity system by 2035, subject to security of supply. Official statistics in DUKES track renewable electricity output and the share of renewables in overall energy consumption on a gross final consumption basis.

=== Electricity support ===
The Renewables Obligation was the main support mechanism for large-scale renewable electricity in Great Britain for much of the 2000s and early 2010s. It obligated suppliers to present renewable obligation certificates or make buy-out payments, and it closed to new generating capacity in 2017 while continuing to support accredited stations for the remainder of their eligibility period.

Contracts for Difference (CfDs) are the main mechanism for supporting new large-scale low-carbon electricity generation in Great Britain. CfD payments are funded through a compulsory supplier levy. Payments can go to generators or be paid back, depending on wholesale market prices relative to contract terms.

=== Heat support ===
Support for renewable heat has included the Renewable Heat Incentive, which closed to new applicants in 2022. In England and Wales, the Boiler Upgrade Scheme provides upfront grants towards the installation of low-carbon heating, including heat pumps, and is administered by Ofgem.

=== Transport fuels ===
Renewable transport fuels are promoted through the Renewable Transport Fuel Obligation, which places an obligation on fuel suppliers and includes sustainability requirements for biofuels reported under the scheme.

== Electricity generation ==
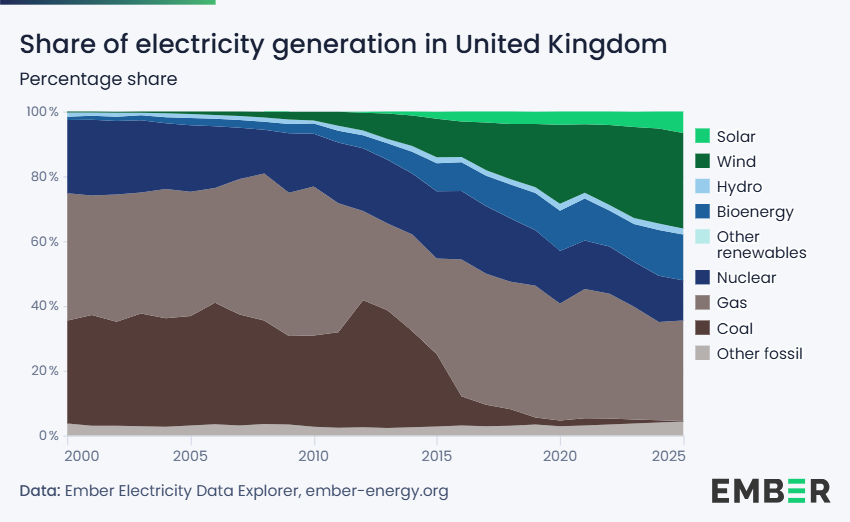
United Kingdom electricity generation by source: percentage share, 2000–2025

Renewable electricity generation in the UK reached a record 143.7 TWh in 2024, accounting for 50.4% of total electricity generation. Renewable electricity generating capacity increased by 4.1 GW (7.3%) during 2024, with around half of new capacity in solar photovoltaics and most of the remainder in wind.

=== Wind ===
Wind power delivers a growing fraction of the energy in the United Kingdom. By the beginning of February 2020, wind power production consisted of 10,429 wind turbines with a total installed capacity of over 22 GW: 13,575 MW of onshore capacity and 8,483 MW of offshore capacity, having risen from 7,950 MW onshore and 4,049 MW offshore since 2015. The UK is ranked as the world's sixth largest producer of wind power, having overtaken France and Italy in 2012. Within the UK, wind power is the second largest source of renewable energy after biomass.

2010 saw the completion of significant projects in the UK wind industry with the Gunfleet Sands, Robin Rigg and Thanet offshore wind farms coming on-stream.

2024 was a record-breaking year for wind power in Great Britain. Nearly 83 terawatt-hours (TWh) of electricity was generated across Great Britain, a 4TWh increase from 2023's 79TWh.

=== Ocean power ===
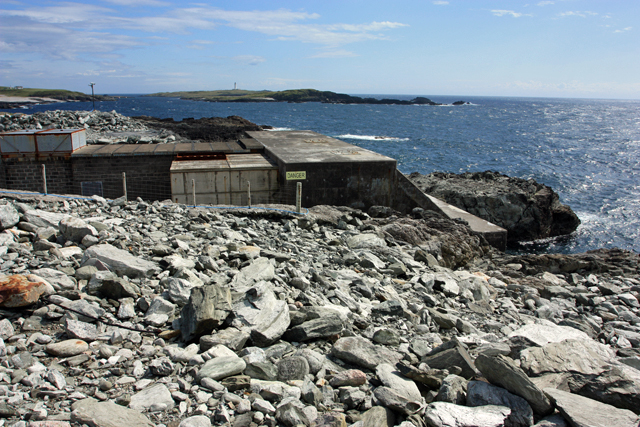
The Islay limpet wave power plant operated between 2000 and 2012

Due to the island location of the UK, the country has great potential for generating electricity from wave power and tidal power. To date, wave and tidal power have received little money for development and consequently have not yet been exploited on a significant commercial basis due to doubts over their economic viability in the UK.

The European Marine Energy Centre in Orkney was established in 2003 to test tidal stream and wave energy devices. It operates a grid connected wave power scheme at Billia Croo outside Stromness and a grid connected tidal test site in the Fall of Warness between the Westray Firth and Stronsay Firth. In the south-west of England, the Wave Hub test centre was developed north of Cornwall in 2010, but only one device was tested there.

Some of the world's first tidal stream arrays have been operating in Scotland since 2016, the Nova Innovation project in Bluemull Sound, Shetland, and the SAE Renewables MeyGen project in the Pentland Firth. Following the Contracts for Difference auctions in 2022, 2023, and 2024, there is now a pipeline to install 83 MW of tidal stream generation in Scotland and 38 MW in Wales at Morlais.

=== Bioenergy ===
Gas from sewage and landfill (biogas) has been exploited in some areas. In 2004, it provided 129.3 GWh (up 690% from 1990 levels), and was the UK's leading renewable energy source, representing 39.4% of all renewable energy produced (including hydro). The UK has committed to a target of 10.3% of renewable energy in transport to comply with the Renewable Energy Directive of the European Union but has not yet implemented legislation to meet this target.

Other biofuels can provide a close-to-carbon-neutral energy source, if locally grown. In South America and Asia, the production of biofuels for export has in some cases resulted in significant ecological damage, including the clearing of rainforest. In 2004, biofuels provided 105.9 GW·h, 38% of it wood. This represented an increase of 500% from 1990.

=== Solar ===
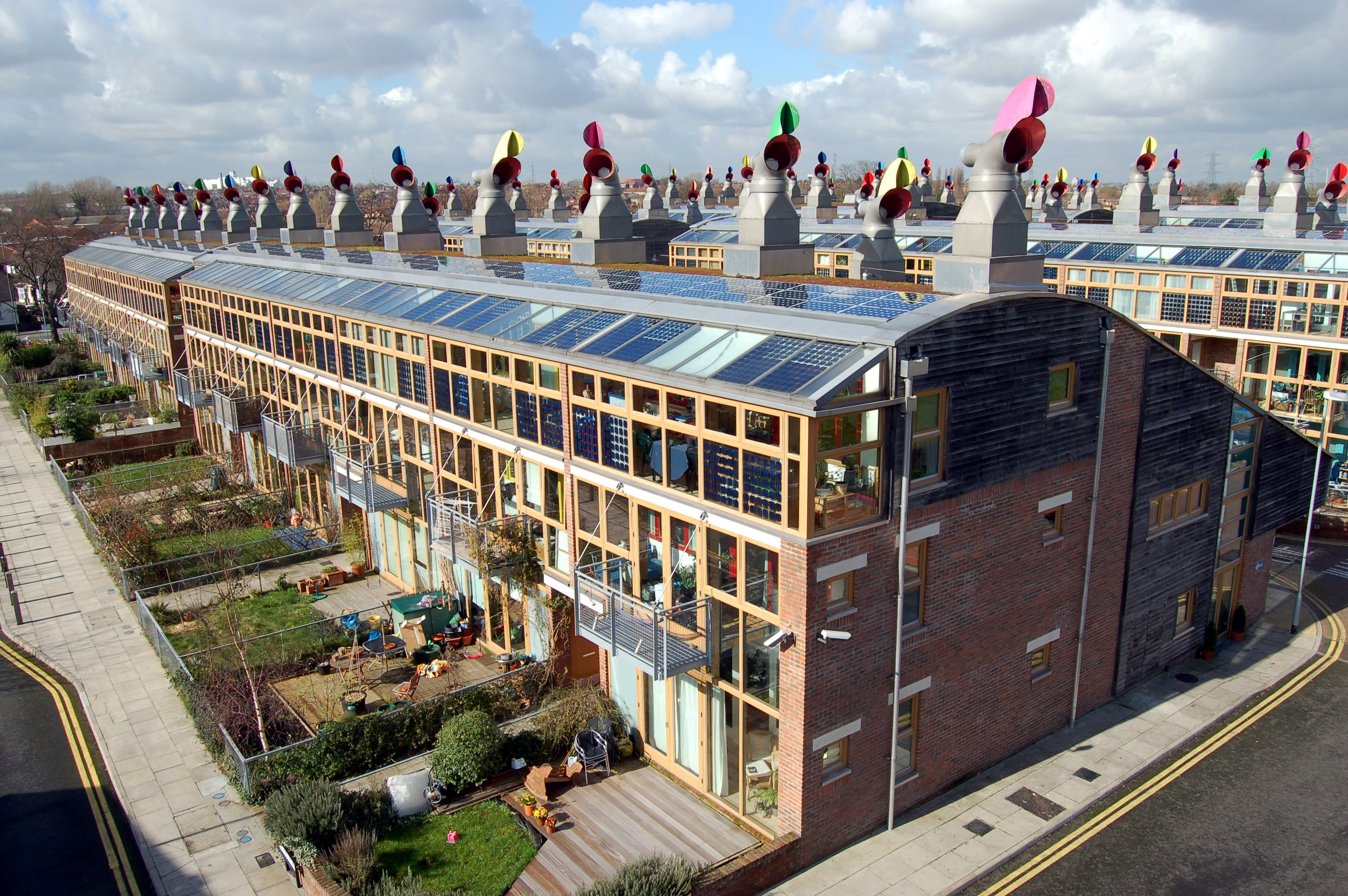
Solar panels on the BedZED development in the London Borough of Sutton

At the end of 2011, there were 230,000 solar power projects in the United Kingdom, with a total installed generating capacity of 750 MW. By February 2012 the installed capacity had reached 1,000 MW. Solar power has increased rapidly in the 2010s, albeit from a small base, as a result of reductions in the cost of photovoltaic (PV) panels, and the introduction of a Feed-in tariff (FIT) subsidy in April 2010. In 2012, the government said that 4 million homes across the UK would be powered by the sun within eight years, representing a target of 22 GW of installed solar power capacity by 2020. By February 2019, approximately 13 GW had been installed. The FIT program closed to new applicants at the end of March 2019 and was replaced by a Smart Export Guarantee.

By 2025, the number of homes with rooftop solar had risen beyond 1.5 million, and the Labour government set a target of 45–47GW of solar generation by 2030.

=== Hydroelectric ===
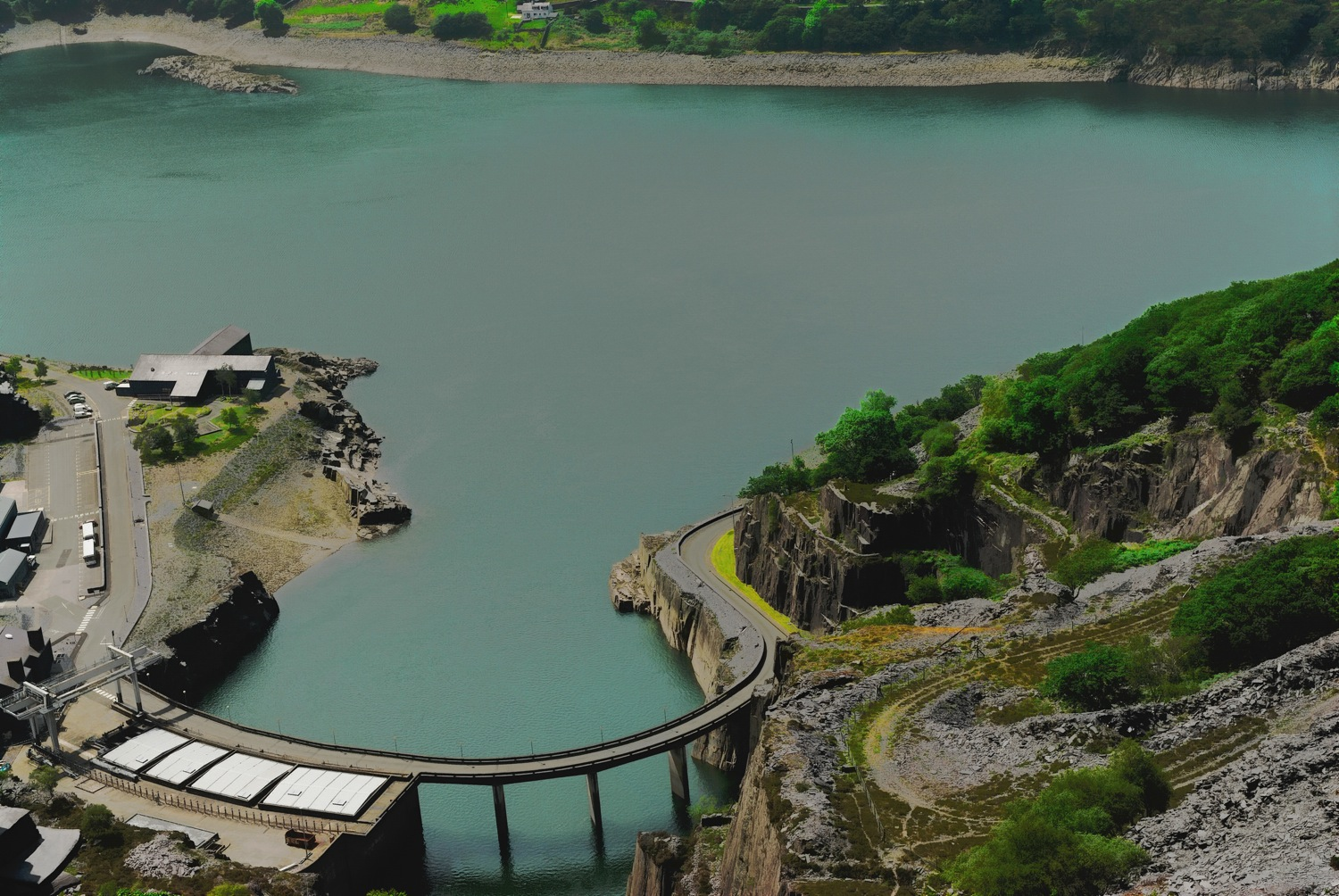
The Dinorwig Power Station lower reservoir, a 1,800 MW pumped-storage hydroelectric scheme, in north Wales, and the largest hydroelectric power station in the UK

As of 2012, hydroelectric power stations in the United Kingdom accounted for 1.67 GW of installed electrical generating capacity, being 1.9% of the UK's total generating capacity and 14% of UK's renewable energy generating capacity. Annual electricity production from such schemes is approximately 5,700 GWh, being about 1.5% of the UK's total electricity production.

There are also pumped-storage power stations in the UK. These power stations are net consumers of electrical energy however they contribute to balancing the grid, which can facilitate renewable generation elsewhere, for example by 'soaking up' surplus renewable output at off-peak times and release the energy when it is required.

== Renewable heat ==
Renewable heat in the UK comes from biomass and biogas, direct renewable heat sources such as solar thermal and geothermal heat, and ambient heat captured by heat pumps.

In 2024, renewable heat demand was mainly solid biomass (60%) and heat pumps (27%). Wastes and biogases accounted for 8.3% and 3.3% respectively, and primary sources such as active solar heating and geothermal heat were about 0.7%.

=== Heat pumps ===
Heat pumps transfer ambient heat into buildings and hot-water systems. They accounted for 27% of renewable heat demand in 2024. The Climate Change Committee reported that heat pump installations increased by 56% in 2024, driven by increased support from government schemes, but that only around 1% of UK homes are heated with a heat pump.

In England and Wales, the Boiler Upgrade Scheme provides grants for low-carbon heating systems. In its annual report for April 2024 to March 2025, Ofgem reported that 49,136 vouchers had been redeemed and that 97% were for air source heat pumps.

=== Geothermal power ===
Investigations into the exploitation of Geothermal power in the United Kingdom, prompted by the 1973 oil crisis, were abandoned as fuel prices fell. Only one scheme is operational, in Southampton. In 2009, planning permission was granted for a geothermal scheme near Eastgate, County Durham, but funding was withdrawn and as of August 2017 there has been no further progress. In November 2018, drilling started for a plant planning permission for a commercial-scale geothermal power plant on the United Downs industrial estate near Redruth by Geothermal Engineering. The plant will produce 3 MW of renewable electricity. In December 2010, the Eden Project in Cornwall was given permission to build a Hot Rock Geothermal Plant. This was completed in June 2023. This was the first deep geothermal heating plant built in Britain since 1987 and cost £24 million in total.

== Transport ==
In 2024, renewables accounted for 6.2% of final energy consumption in the UK transport sector.

Official statistics for 2024 stated that renewable fuels accounted for 8% (3,809 million litres equivalent) of all road and non-road mobile machinery fuel supplied to the UK under the reporting framework. Waste feedstocks supplied 2,897 million litres equivalent of renewable fuel in 2024, accounting for 77% of verified renewable fuel supply. The report gave a breakdown of verified renewable fuel, including bioethanol (39%) and biodiesel (22%). It reported an average greenhouse gas saving of 80% compared with fossil fuels, or 77% when indirect land-use change was accounted for.

== Microgeneration ==
Microgeneration technologies are seen as having considerable potential by the Government. However, the microgeneration strategy launched in March 2006 was seen as a disappointment by many commentators. Microgeneration involves the local production of electricity by homes and businesses from low-energy sources including small scale wind turbines, and solar electricity installations. The Climate Change and Sustainable Energy Act 2006 is expected to boost the number of microgeneration installations, however, funding for grants under the Low Carbon Building Programme is proving insufficient to meet demand with funds for March 2007 being spent in 75 minutes.

== Community energy systems ==
Sustainable community energy systems, pioneered by Woking Borough Council, provide an integrated approach to using cogeneration, renewables and other technologies to provide sustainable energy supplies to an urban community. It is expected that the same approach will be developed in other towns and cities, including London. Highlands and Islands Community Energy Company based in Inverness are active in developing community-owned and led initiatives in Scotland.

In England, Low Carbon Hub, based in Oxford, has developed one of the country's largest portfolios of community-owned renewable energy, including Ray Valley Solar, one of the largest community-owned solar parks in the United Kingdom, and Sandford Hydro, the largest community-owned hydroelectric scheme on the River Thames. In 2026, Low Carbon Hub announced plans to add the UK's first community-owned co-located battery energy storage system to Ray Valley Solar.

An energy positive house was built in Wales for £125,000 in July 2015. It is expected to generate £175 in electricity export for each £100 spent on electricity.

== Grid integration and storage ==
Renewable electricity generation from wind and solar varies with weather, so it is integrated using forecasting, flexible generation and demand, network reinforcement, interconnection and electricity storage. In Great Britain, the National Energy System Operator (NESO) balances supply and demand in real time and manages constraints on the electricity transmission system.

When network limits restrict power flows from regions with high renewable output, NESO can take balancing actions that include instructing some generators to reduce output (curtailment) while increasing output elsewhere, which adds to balancing costs. NESO's 2025 Annual Balancing Costs Report reported total balancing costs of £2.7 billion in FY2024/25, up from £2.5 billion in FY2023/24, and stated that higher thermal constraints were a principal driver of the increase. The report stated that thermal constraint costs totalled £1.7 billion in FY2024/25 and were linked in part to congestion and to planned outages in Scotland intended to increase transfer capacity across key constraint boundaries.

Delays in obtaining firm grid connection dates have been cited as a barrier to renewable and storage deployment in Great Britain. Ofgem-backed reforms approved in 2025 changed the transmission connections process from a first-come, first-served queue towards prioritising projects assessed as ready and needed. Ofgem has approved major investment to upgrade and expand the transmission network, including funding for multiple transmission projects over a five-year period from 2026.

Electricity storage can reduce curtailment and provide flexibility by shifting renewable electricity from periods of high output to periods of higher demand. The UK government's statutory security of supply report for 2025 described short-duration storage as including domestic and grid-scale batteries that store electricity for up to eight hours, and described long-duration electricity storage as including technologies such as pumped storage that can provide power for eight hours or more. The same report stated that the UK had just over 6 GW of grid-scale batteries on the system and 2.8 GW of long-duration electricity storage, and it reported a government ambition for 23 to 27 GW of grid-scale batteries and 4 to 6 GW of long-duration electricity storage by 2030.

In Northern Ireland, the electricity transmission system is operated by the System Operator for Northern Ireland (SONI) and participates in the all-island wholesale electricity market known as the Single Electricity Market.

== Economics ==
UK government estimated levelised costs (pence/kWh) of low-carbon electricity generation technologies
Technology	forecast made in 2010 (2010 prices)		forecast made in 2016 (2014 prices)		forecast made in 2020 (2018 prices)		forecast made in 2023 (2021 prices)		forecast made in 2025 (2024 prices)	
Technology	2011	2040	2020	2025	2030	2040	2035	2040	2035	2050
Solar PV	34.3	8	6.7	6.3	3.9	3.3	3.2	3.0	5.5	5.0
Onshore wind	8.3	5.5	6.3	6.1	4.5	4.4	3.6	3.6	5.7	5.1
Offshore wind	16.9	8.5	9.2	8.6	4.7	4.0	4.3	4.1	9.8	8.9
Floating offshore wind									12.4	9.1
Nuclear	9.6	6	–	9.5	Not declared – deemed commercially confidential Hinkley Point C (HPC) about 10.6 (2021 prices)				13.3 (HPC)	–
CCGT with carbon capture (CCUS)	10.0	10	–	11.0	8.7	8.2	16.5	17.9	10.1	10.1
Wood CFBC / Biomass	10.3	7.5	8.7	–	9.8	9.8	10.2	10.2		
Geothermal	15.9	9	21.5	18.0	12.4	12.2	12.7	12.7		
Hydro			8.0	8.0	8.8	8.8	7.7	7.7		
River hydro (best locations)	6.9	5								
Tidal stream	29.3	13	–	32.8	20.5	18.8	12.6	9.9		
Tidal barrage	51.8	22								

In the 2010s, offshore wind prices dropped far more rapidly than forecasts predicted, and in 2017 two offshore wind farm bids were made at a cost of 5.75 pence/kWh (£57.50/MWh) for construction by 2022–2023, which was recognised in the 2020 forecast.

For comparison, CCGT (combined cycle gas turbine) without carbon capture or carbon costs had an estimated cost in 2025 of 5.4 pence/kWh (£54/MWh) in 2021 prices, or including carbon costs 11.4 pence/kWh (£114/MWh).

=== Strike prices ===
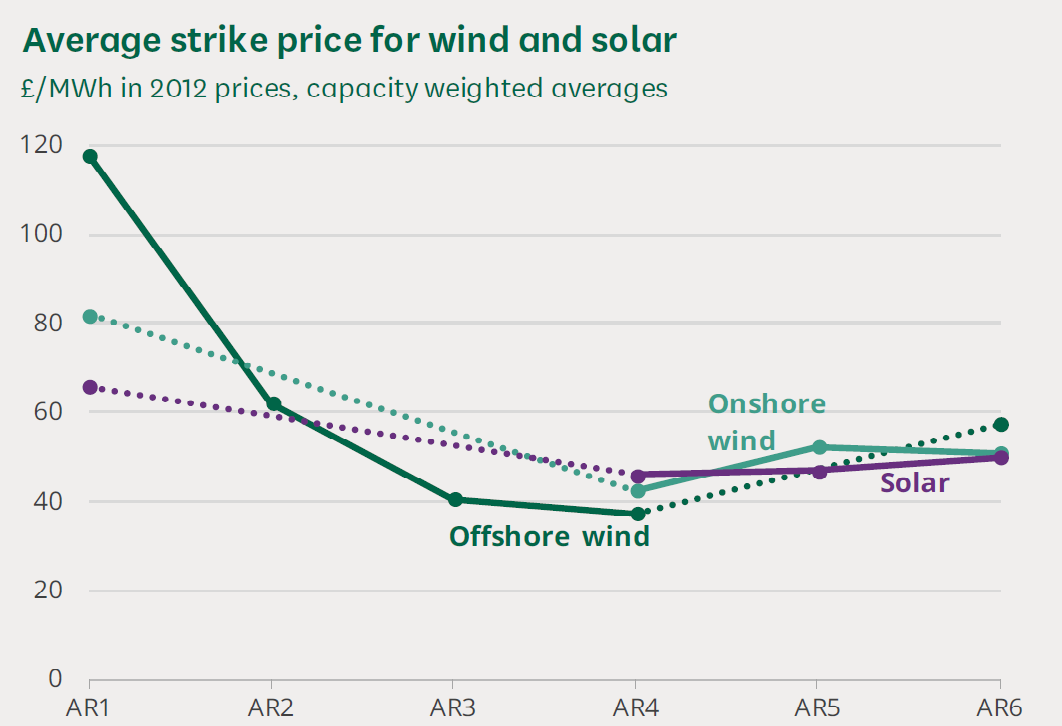
Average strike prices for the bidding rounds AR1 (2014/15) to AR6 (2024)

The "strike price" forms the basis of the Contracts for Difference between the 'generator and the Low Carbon Contracts Company (LCCC), a government-owned company' and guarantees the price per MWh paid to the electricity producer. It is not the same as the levelised cost of electricity (LCOE) which is a first order estimate of the average cost the producer must receive to break-even.

Low-carbon generation sources have agreed "strike prices" in the range £50–£79.23/MWh for photovoltaic, £80/MWh for energy from waste, £79.23–£82.5/MWh for onshore wind, and £114.39–£119.89/MWh for offshore wind and conversion technologies (all expressed in 2012 prices). These prices are indexed to inflation.

Completion of the North Sea Link in 2021 allowed the UK to access less expensive sources in the south Norway bidding area (NO_{2}) of Nord Pool Spot. Similarly, in 2023 Viking Link gave the UK access to the less expensive west Denmark bidding area (DK1) of Nord Pool Spot.

In 2025, for the forthcoming Allocation Round 7 (AR7) auction, the CfD contract length was increased from 15 to 20 years for wind and solar bids, which is likely to lower the price of the winning bids. Also bids will be accepted without full planning consent, provided a Development Consent Order application was accepted at least twelve months ago.

== See also ==
- Renewable energy in Scotland
- Renewable energy in Wales
- Renewable energy in the Republic of Ireland
- Energy policy of the United Kingdom
- Energy in the United Kingdom
- Green electricity in the United Kingdom
- Renewable energy by country
- List of renewable resources produced and traded by the United Kingdom
- Renewable energy in the European Union
- UK Emissions Trading Scheme
