= Boiler scrappage scheme =

2010 UK scrappage scheme

The UK boiler scrappage scheme was a scrappage scheme to subsidise up to 125,000 English households to install newer, fuel-efficient heating systems and stay warm without wasting energy. Each qualifying household would receive a £400 grant. Households that took part were expected to save between £200 and £235 a year on fuel bills, cut their carbon emissions and sustain work for the heating industry.

The scheme was announced by the Chancellor Alistair Darling in a Pre-Budget Report at the end of 2009 and launched on 5 January 2010. A similar vehicle scrappage scheme had already been announced in the 2009 budget. The total cost was to be £50 million, with a further £150 million for the Warm Front Scheme.

To qualify, one had to live in England and have a working G-rated boiler. Successful applicants received a voucher for £400 off the price of either a modern A-rated boiler or a renewable heating system (such as a biomass boiler, heat pump or micro CHP). After a completed installation, the voucher could be redeemed from the Energy Saving Trust for its £400 monetary value.

Some suppliers were criticised for high prices of the replacement boilers offered. Even though some of the major power companies were offering a further £400 discount to match the government voucher, their overall price was still considerably greater than that from an independent fitter.

Unlike some other UK schemes, the scheme was taken up widely and all 125,000 vouchers were claimed within a few months, with the scheme then closing. Later schemes were available but were targeted at benefits claimants, rather than the least efficient boilers.

== See also ==
- The Green Deal
- Renewable Heat Incentive
