= Fuse Energy =

English energy technology company

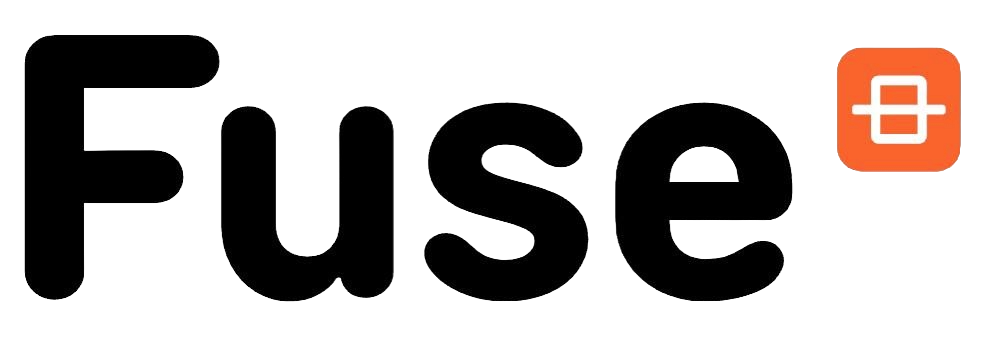
- Type: Private
- Industry: Energy
- Founded: 2022
- Founders: Alan Chang; Charles Orr
- Headquarters: London, England
- Area served: United Kingdom
- Key people: Alan Chang (CEO)
- Products: Electricity, natural gas
- Services: Renewable energy generation, energy supply, wholesale energy trading
- Website: fuseenergy.com

Fuse Energy is a British energy technology company and an electricity and natural gas supplier headquartered in London. It supplies households in Great Britain and owns solar farms and an onshore wind turbine.

Fuse Energy was founded in 2022 by chief executive Alan Chang, a former chief revenue officer at Revolut, and chief operating officer Charles Orr, an early hire at Revolut. The company acquired a licensed electricity supplier in February 2022 and began supplying customers publicly in July 2023. Bloomberg News described it as Britain's first new energy supplier in two years, following a market crisis during which around 30 suppliers ceased trading.

As of December 2025, Fuse Energy supplied about 200,000 UK households and was valued at approximately US$5 billion following a $70 million funding round. By June 2026, it supplied more than 300,000 households.

== History ==
=== Founding and supply licence ===
The company initially operated under the name Tesseract. Chang has said he moved into the energy industry in response to rising energy prices and climate change.

In February 2022, the company acquired Paddington Power Limited, which held an electricity supply licence from the regulator Ofgem. Paddington Power Limited was renamed Fuse Energy Supply Limited in February 2023.

In July 2022, Fuse Energy acquired Balnamoon Renewables, its first generation asset, before launching its retail supply service.

=== Formal launch and growth ===
In July 2023, Fuse Energy supplied about 200 homes through a beta service before launching publicly as an electricity supplier. At launch, it offered an electricity tariff priced around £60 below the Ofgem price cap.

Ofgem granted Fuse a gas supply licence on 22 November 2024. The company announced its entry into the domestic gas market in July 2025. Fuse Energy supplied electricity to about 50,000 UK homes at the time.

In January 2026, The Sunday Times ranked Fuse Energy first in the hardware and other technology category of its 100 Tech league table, with a three-year annual sales growth rate of 484% and latest annual sales of £129.7 million. In May, the company acquired the 20 MW Cwm Ifor solar project in South Wales. By June, it supplied more than 300,000 UK households and had acquired the 25 MW Sherbourne Solar project in Warwickshire. The company also announced a new 32,000-square-foot headquarters at One Bank Street in Canary Wharf.

=== Funding ===
Fuse Energy raised $78 million in a 2022 seed round led by Balderton Capital and Lakestar.

A July 2025 fundraising valued the company at about $1 billion. In December 2025, Fuse Energy raised $70 million in a round backed by Balderton Capital, Lowercarbon Capital and QuantumLight, valuing the company at about $5 billion. In June 2026, the company said it had secured a further $30 million from investors including Collaborative Fund and 20VC.

=== International expansion ===
By June 2024, Fuse Energy was planning to buy and develop renewable-energy projects in Ireland, including solar farms. Fuse Energy Ireland Limited filed an annual return in March 2025.

In December 2025, the company announced plans to launch energy supply in Ireland, Spain and the United States. In Spain, the National Commission on Markets and Competition recorded a July 2026 proceeding involving Fuse Technologies Limited's acquisition of exclusive control over Manuel Robres Celades S.L.U. in the electricity sector.

== Operations ==
=== Business model ===
Fuse Energy owns renewable generation assets, manages wholesale energy purchasing and supplies energy to households.

According to the company, it buys and sells electricity on wholesale markets through an in-house trading desk. Its forecasting system uses machine-learning models incorporating weather forecasts and household consumption patterns to estimate demand at property level. Those forecasts inform wholesale purchasing and the balancing of expected supply against customer usage.

=== Generation ===
==== Solar ====
Fuse Energy entered solar generation in July 2023 by acquiring two operational sites from Hive Ethical UK Solar: the 12.1 MW Bullous Park solar farm near Okehampton, and the 5.1 MW Netley North solar farm in Hampshire. In September 2025, its first newly built solar farm, the approximately 4 MW Netley Central site near Southampton, began operating.

In May 2026, Fuse Energy acquired the fully consented 20 MW Cwm Ifor Solar Farm near Caerphilly from Caerphilly County Borough Council.

The following month, Fuse Energy acquired Sherbourne Solar from Pelagic Energy Development. The approximately 25 MW project, west of Warwick, was ready for construction and was targeting grid connection in early 2027.

==== Wind ====
Fuse Energy's Balnamoon site in Moray, Scotland, consists of an operational 0.8 MW onshore wind turbine.

=== Retail supply ===
Fuse Energy supplies electricity and gas to households in Great Britain. It operates without a call centre and provides customer support through a 24-hour messaging service. According to the company, customers can sign up and manage their accounts through its mobile app and website.

As of 2 November 2026, Fuse Energy had the highest Trustpilot score among the suppliers listed in SwitchPal's comparison, at 4.9 out of 5.

For the scheme year running from April 2026 to March 2027, Ofgem lists Fuse Energy among the mandatory licensees under the Smart Export Guarantee, the programme through which electricity suppliers pay eligible small-scale generators for exported power.
