= RHI =

RHI may refer to:

- Renewable Heat Incentive, a payment system in the United Kingdom from 2011
- RHI Entertainment, former name of the American entertainment company Halcyon Studios, LLC.
- Rhinecliff station, New York (Amtrak), RHI being the station code
- Rhinelander-Oneida County Airport, IATA code RHI
- Rhiwbina railway station, Cardiff, Wales; National Rail station code RHI
- Robert Half International
- Roller Hockey International
- RHI AG, an Austrian manufacturing company
