= Renewable Heat Incentive =

Energy payment system in the UK

The Renewable Heat Incentive (the RHI) is a payment system in England, Scotland and Wales, for the generation of heat from renewable energy sources. Introduced on 28 November 2011, the RHI replaced the Low Carbon Building Programme, which closed in 2010.

The RHI operates in a similar manner to the Feed-in Tariff system, and was introduced through the same legislation - the Energy Act 2008. In the first phase of the RHI cash payments are paid to owners who install renewable heat generation equipment in non-domestic buildings: Commercial RHI.

The RHI went live on 28 November 2011 for non domestic buildings. The Coalition Government confirmed its support for the RHI in the October 2010 Spending Review and published details on 10 March 2011. The RHI was extended to domestic buildings on 9 April 2014 after a further series of delays. Three consultations were launched which included proposed domestic tariffs and a long discussion on eligible technologies along with changes to the non-domestic RHI which included proposals to triple the tariffs for ground source heat pumps and the proposed addition of a tariff for air to water heat pumps.

Investment in low carbon technologies is a private investment for a public benefit. The non-domestic RHI scheme closed to new applicants on 31 March 2021, and the domestic RHI scheme closed to new applicants on 31 March 2022.

Domestic RHI was replaced in England and Wales by the Boiler Upgrade Scheme, which began accepting applications on 1 April 2022.

== Non-domestic RHI ==
The Non-Domestic Renewable Heat Incentive Scheme (NDRHI) in Great Britain closed to new applicants on 31 March 2021.

Through the Non-domestic RHI, generators of renewable heat for non-domestic buildings can be paid up to 10.44p/kWhr for hot water and up to 9.09p/kWhr for heat which they generate and use themselves. The RHI tariff depends on which renewable heat systems are used and the scale of generation. The annual subsidy lasts for 20 years for non-domestic buildings, and seven years for domestic buildings. As such, users may earn enough money from the tariffs to pay off their installation costs in five to eight years. According to the Government, which has set the tariff levels, users will earn a return of 12% per annum. This is tax free income for individuals. The equivalent for Feed-In Tariffs is 5–8%.

Are You Compliant with Heat Meter Recalibration Requirements for the Non-Domestic RHI? 2022
Ofgem has recently sent out communications that require every RHI participant to recalibrate all heat meters at least every 10 years (or in line with the manufacturer's instructions where available, whichever is sooner). The 10-year start date begins from when your meters were first installed, most recently recalibrated or replaced.
To comply with this requirement, you can choose to either recalibrate or replace your meter. Failure to comply will be considered a breach of your ongoing obligations and could result in payments being suspended or permanently withheld.

The RHI provides support for community and district heating schemes where a single renewable heat system provides heat or hot water to more than one property.

=== Eligibility for the Non-domestic RHI ===
The renewable heat technologies which are eligible under the Non-domestic RHI are solar thermal (hot water) panels, ground source heat pumps, water source heat pumps, biomass boilers, and biomethane. The list was extended in April 2014 to include air to water heat pumps and deep geothermal. See table of tariffs for the Non-domestic RHI.

=== Criticism of the Non-domestic RHI ===
Although based on the Energy Act 2008, the Non-domestic RHI was not introduced until November 2011. Although intended to support a range of renewable heat technologies, nearly all the initial incentives were paid for biomass boilers. The larger initial tariffs for biomass boilers decreased the demand for other renewable technologies including heat pumps and solar thermal. From May 2014 the Non-domestic RHI tariffs have been realigned with increased tariffs for ground source heat pumps and the introduction of RHI tariffs for air to water heat pumps. The effect of prescriptive legislation has been to inhibit innovation in renewable technologies - although one of the stated aims of the RHI has been to encourage innovation.

In Northern Ireland, the RHI scheme was implemented with serious flaws, allowing business owners to make a profit from heating properties that were previously unheated. The political fallout led to the Renewable Heat Incentive scandal.

== Domestic RHI ==
The introduction of Domestic RHI has been delayed many times following a series of tardy consultation processes. The latest delay is from summer 2013 to April 2014. It is now available for eligible installations commissioned from 15 July 2009 onwards. Any installation taking place between September 2011 and 31 March 2014 was eligible for the Renewable Heat Premium Payments which consisted of a small upfront payment prior to the RHI being introduced.

=== Eligibility for Domestic RHI ===
Through the Domestic RHI, generators of renewable heat for single domestic buildings can be paid up to 20.66p/kWhr for solar thermal hot water and up to 20.46p/kWhr for heat which they generated by a ground source heat pump. The RHI tariff depends on which renewable heat systems are used and the scale of generation. The tariffs are larger than for the Non-domestic RHI, but are paid over seven years, rather than for 20 years for non-domestic buildings. See table of tariffs for the Domestic RHI.

=== Criticism of the Domestic RHI ===
Although based on the Energy Act 2008, DECC has taken six years before introducing the Domestic RHI. Delays have been very damaging to the renewable energy industries – which DECC claims to be supporting.

The RHI has suppressed innovations in renewable energy sectors by excluding from incentives any technologies which are not already well established.

== See also ==
- Boiler scrappage scheme, launched in 2010
- Feed-in tariffs in the United Kingdom
- Renewable Heat Incentive scandal in Northern Ireland
