= Energy Saving Trust =

UK not for profit addressing Climate Change

Energy Saving Trust is a British organization devoted to promoting energy efficiency, energy conservation, and the sustainable use of energy, thereby reducing carbon dioxide emissions and helping to prevent man-made climate change. It was founded in the United Kingdom as a government-sponsored initiative in 1992, following the global Earth Summit.

Energy Saving Trust is a private company limited by guarantee. All profits are invested back into the business in pursuit of its mission to address the climate emergency. Energy Saving Trust has regional offices in England, Wales, Northern Ireland, and Scotland and runs numerous energy advice services in the UK. It maintains a comprehensive website, and customer advice service.

== History and purpose ==
Energy Saving Trust was formally established in November 1992. It was formed as a public-private partnership in response both to the director-general of Ofgas's 1991 proposal to increase energy efficiency in natural gas use, and to the global June 1992 Earth Summit call to reduce greenhouse gas emissions and prevent global warming and climate change. In the wake of energy-supplier privatisation in the UK, Energy Saving Trust was also specifically formed as an instrument to ensure energy conservation and carbon-emission reduction in a free-market environment. The structure, scope, nature, and funding of Energy Saving Trust's activities and programmes have varied over the years due to governmental policy changes; however its primary focus – on consumers and households – has remained the same. It is the largest provider of energy-saving advice, and has affected significant and measurable savings of energy, money, and carbon.

Energy Saving Trust's main goals are to achieve the sustainable use of energy and to cut carbon dioxide emissions. It acts as a bridge between consumers, government, trade, businesses, third sector organisations, local authorities, and the energy market. Energy Saving Trust's target audience is consumers, local authorities, energy companies, and policy makers. Among other activities, they provide:

- Free advice, information, and action plans to individuals, organizations, communities, consumers, and the private sector on how to reduce carbon emissions, use water more sustainably, and save money on energy bills
- Grants and grant-finding advice for energy-saving projects, installations, and purchases
- Energy-saving certification, assurance, and accreditation services for businesses and consumer goods
- Independent and authoritative research, and policy analysis, in energy-conservation areas including household energy efficiency, low-carbon transport, renewable energy, and microgeneration
- Management or delivery of government programmes
- Testing of low-carbon technology
- Development of energy-efficient models and tools

== Services provided ==
Energy Saving Trust provides free advice to help people reduce energy use, save money on energy bills, and support jobs and growth in renewable energy industries.

For individuals, Energy Saving Trust provides information and advice on subjects including:

- Insulation
- Solar power
- Heat pumps
- Generating renewable energy
- low carbon travel and transport

For business and organisations, Energy Saving Trust provides numerous services including:

- Green Deal and other certifications
- Advice and analysis
- Technology and technical resources
- Transport checks, advice, information, and green certifications
- An assortment of government and local programmes
- International action, advice, and bespoke consultations

=== Energy Industry Voluntary Redress Scheme ===
Energy Saving Trust manages the Energy Industry Voluntary Redress Scheme on behalf of Office of Gas and Electricity Markets (Ofgem). The Redress Scheme was launched by Ofgem in 2018 to support vulnerable energy consumers and fund the development of energy products and services to reduce the environmental impact of energy use. It is funded by energy companies who have breached their operating licence conditions.

In the Energy Industry Voluntary Redress Scheme's thirteenth round of funding, started in October 2021, £11.5 million was made available to charities across England, Scotland and Wales.

== See also ==
- Carbon Trust
- Low Carbon Building Programme
- Energy use and conservation in the United Kingdom
- Energy policy of the United Kingdom
