= Feed-in tariffs in the United Kingdom =

A feed-in tariff (FIT) is paid by energy suppliers in the United Kingdom if a property or organisation generates their own electricity using technology such as solar panels or wind turbines and feeds any surplus back to the grid. The FIT scheme was imposed on suppliers by the UK government, and applied to installations completed between July 2009 and March 2019.

== Timespan ==
The FIT scheme entered into law through the Energy Act 2008 and commenced in April 2010, with backdated applications accepted for generation systems installed from July 2009 onwards. Payments were contracted for either 20 or 25 years. The scheme closed to new applicants on 31 March 2019.

== Scope ==
The Feed-In Tariff applies to small-scale generation of electricity using eligible renewable technologies. To encourage development of these technologies, feed-in tariffs pay the generator a certain amount – even for energy which the generator themselves consumes. Electricity fed into the grid receives an additional export tariff. Costs for the programme are borne by all British electricity consumers proportionally. Payments through the scheme are intended to replace the ROCs available through the Renewables Obligation for small-scale renewable energy generators. In detail:

- The tariff is available only to renewable sources producing up to 5 MW. Specific rates are set for different technologies and at different scales of installation for those technologies. Generators of renewable electricity larger than 5MW remain eligible to earn Renewables Obligation Certificates within the existing Renewables Obligation quota mechanism. To prevent companies from moving large scale (for example big wind) projects from the ROCs to the Feed-in Tariff programme, measures were taken to discourage the breaking-up of bigger projects into several small ones to fit within the 5MW size cap.
- There are several other qualification requirements, including: certification under the Microgeneration Certification Scheme and the REAL Code for systems up to 50 kW; the use of specific metering standards; and systems being installed no earlier than July 2009. From 1 April 2012, homeowners applying for FIT for solar generation had to provide an energy performance certificate with at least a Band D rating to qualify for the highest rate of payment.
- The contract term is 20 years, or 25 years for solar photovoltaic projects: this means that, starting from 2010, British providers of wind energy, hydropower, energy from biomass and anaerobic digestion eligible for the FIT scheme were rewarded with a tariff rate guaranteed for the next 20 or 25 years.
- The tariff made available to generators was subject to degression, meaning that the tariff level available for new generators decreased each year. The rate of degression varied by renewable energy technology. The price for individual renewable energy generating plants was fixed once the plant became operational.
- Costs for the programme are paid by the energy suppliers. Suppliers are expected to pass on the cost to their electricity customers.

In 2010, the UK government estimated that feed-in tariffs to support small-scale low-carbon generation would cost £8.6 billion up to 2030 and produce monetised carbon savings worth £0.42 billion.

Feed-in-Tariff payments are tax-free in the UK.

== Year one feedback ==
A study from the University of London assessed the first year of the UK FIT scheme through interviews with both users of the scheme and government figures. The key findings were that users have had a wide variety of experiences, depending on the technology they are working with, and that the government had very limited ambitions on small-scale renewable energy generation.

Domestic solar performed well in the first year, with 28,028 of the 28,614 total solar installations (totalling nearly 78MW). Wind power was the next highest installation level with 1,348 (20.4MW). Small hydro had 206 (12.1MW), although many were not new installations, but had been transferred from the Renewable Obligation scheme. Micro-CHP had 98 installations (0.09MW), and Anaerobic Digestion (AD) had just 2 (0.66MW). AD came under scrutiny in 2011 to determine why development was so poor.

The study suggested that technologies have a variety of factors affecting their performance in terms of installation levels. The factors include cost, size, availability, standardisation of the technology, planning issues, ease of installation, perceived sensory impact (sight, sound and smell) and administrative complexity. Domestic PV scores very positively on all these factors, while small hydro and AD do far less well.

The proposed changes to the tariff levels for PV have been met with anger by many in the solar industry, but the FIT policy, along with the Green Investment Bank and now carbon reduction targets, are widely understood to be threatened by the Treasury department. This is due to the schemes being considered as liabilities on the national balance sheet.

== Reviews to feed-in tariff rates in 2011 ==
Less than a year into the scheme, in March 2011 the new coalition Government announced that support for large-scale photovoltaic installations (greater than 50 kW) would be cut. From 1 August 2011 the rate for installations over 50 kW was to range from 19p/kWh to 8.5p/kWh for the largest qualifying installations (5MW), with the Government claiming that this would prevent the scheme from becoming 'overwhelmed'.

Revised tariffs for farm-scale anaerobic digestion initially of either 14p/kWh or 13p/kWh, depending on the installation size, were introduced from September 2011.

On 31 October 2011 a second review of the Feed in Tariffs for low carbon electricity generation was announced which is likely to take effect from 12 December 2011. The rates for small photovoltaic installations have been reduced from 43.3p/kWh to 21 pence/kWh. The reason for the second review is that FITs for PV were being taken up too quickly and that the DECC funding allocation for FITs was in danger of being exceeded. A further reason is that the cost of installing PV panels has reduced by around 50% and therefore the FITs had become less of an encouragement to install PV panels and more of an incitement to profit from excessive subsidies. See revised tariff tables for FITs.

== Reviews to feed-in tariff rates in 2012 ==
In its second year, the government announced further cuts to the FIT scheme. On 3 March the tariff was cut to 21p/kWh. This cut was originally scheduled for 12 December 2011 but was delayed, following a successful joint appeal to the High Court by Friends of the Earth and two solar companies, Solarcentury and HomeSun. The 1 August review of the FIT brought an additional cut to 16p/kWh. The cut was partnered with a rise in export rate (the price at which the homeowner can sell excess electricity back to the supplier) from 3.1p to 4.5p for every kWh of electricity exported to the grid. A further cut came into effect on 1 November, the tariff dropping to 15.44p/kWh, and this rate was set to remain until 1 February 2013.

In addition, generators with more than 25 solar PV installations were granted a 10% increase in the amount they receive from the FIT, from 80% to 90%, this however will not be likely to affect domestic users. The cut in FITs was due to the falling installation costs, and the fact that people were applying for the feed-in tariff scheme in numbers exceeding DECC forecasts and funding allocations. The aforementioned rates would only affect new installations – existing schemes would not be affected . The new tariffs would also now be paid over 20 years instead of 25 years (they will remain linked to the Retail Price Index) with a review every three months based on solar PV uptake levels in three bands: domestic (size 0-10 kW), small commercial (10-50 kW) and large commercial (above 50 kW and standalone installations). Despite suggestions that the European solar market was in decline, a report by the International Energy Agency showed that for a second year in a row, solar PV was the dominant form of new electricity installation during 2012, ahead of both wind and gas power.

== Replacement by the Smart Export Guarantee ==
The Department for Business, Energy and Industrial Strategy (BEIS) published a consultation on 19 July 2018, and stated their intention to close the FIT scheme to new applicants from 1 April 2019 and not replace it with a new subsidy.

On 10 June 2019, Ofgem announced that BEIS had introduced the Smart Export Guarantee (SEG), in force from 1 January 2020. This is not a direct replacement of the feed-in tariff scheme, but rather a new initiative that rewards solar generators for electricity exported to the grid. Energy suppliers with more than 150,000 domestic customers must provide at least one export tariff. The export tariff rate must be greater than zero. Export is measured by smart meters which the energy supplier installs free of charge.

In September 2021, Ofgem published the Smart Export Guarantee (SEG) Annual Report 2020–21, stating that 4,593 generators signed up to a SEG tariff in 2020–21, with a total installed capacity of 19,195 kW; exports totalled 2,568,810 kWh and generators received £114,480 in payments.

== Related schemes ==
A similar incentive for renewable heat – the Renewable Heat Incentive – was introduced in November 2011.

== Free electricity schemes ==
The FIT scheme has created a number of start-up companies providing free electricity in return for installing solar panels on the homeowner's roof. If the homeowner cannot afford the capital outlay, the companies offer a capital-free way of getting the benefits of solar and free electricity.

After the December 2015 Feed-in Tariff reductions were announced, some free solar panel installers ceased trading, or had plans to stop installing, as the returns were no longer financially viable. The change in the feed-in tariff equated to a 64% decrease in the generation tariff for solar arrays below 4 kW, which is the largest decrease since the scheme began in 2010. The changes meant that larger systems (over 10 kW) received a higher feed in tariff rate than smaller domestic-sized systems, which might have led to the remaining free solar panel companies exclusively providing commercial installations.

== See also ==
- Microgeneration
- Energy policy of the United Kingdom
- Energy use and conservation in the United Kingdom
- Climate Change and Sustainable Energy Act 2006
- Renewable energy in the European Union
- Feed-in tariffs in Germany
- Feed-in tariffs in Australia
- Renewable Heat Incentive
