= Biomass heating system =

Heating system using biomass

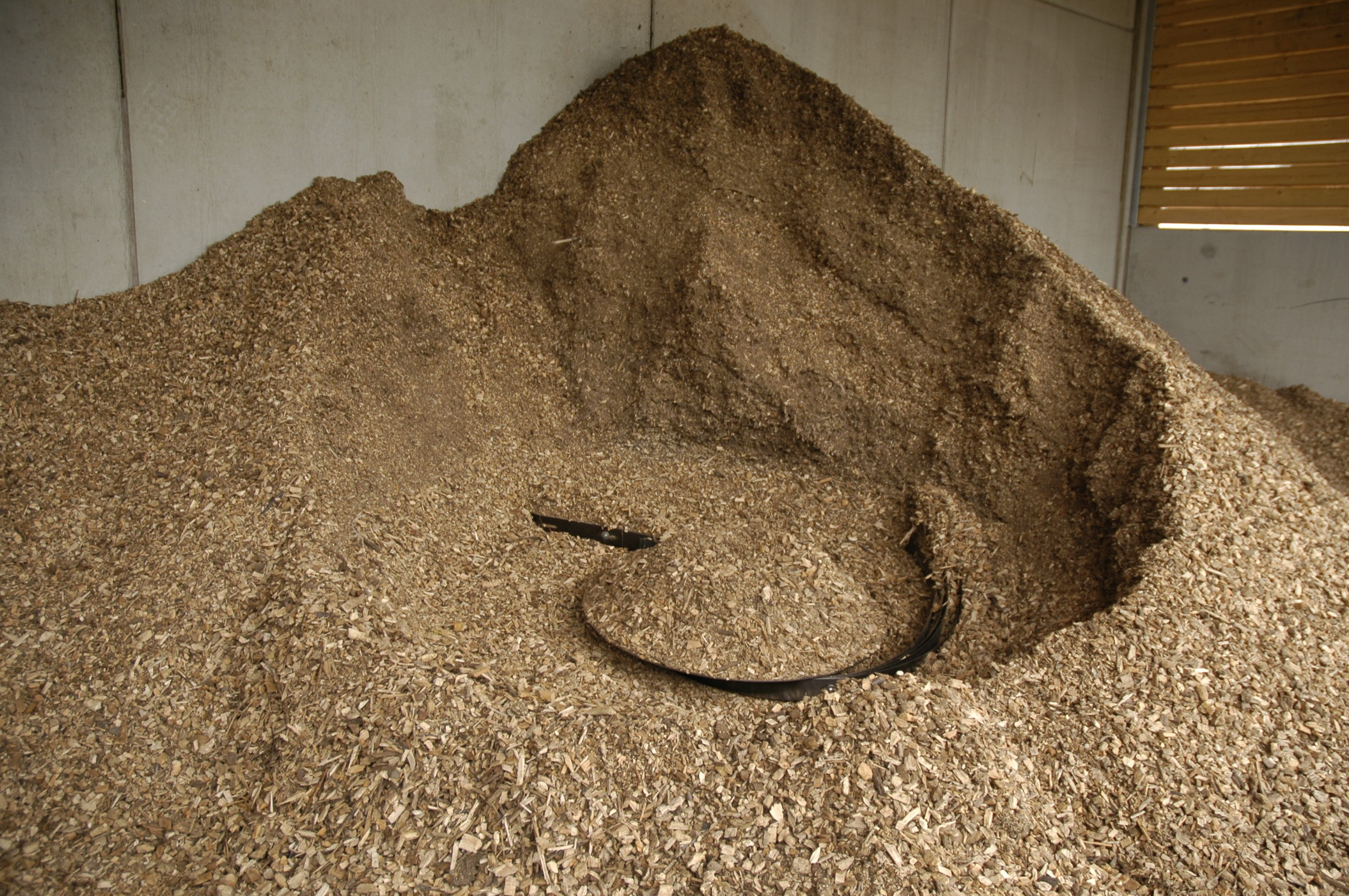
Wood chips in a storage hopper, in the middle an agitator to transport the material with a screw conveyor to the boiler

Biomass heating systems generate heat from biomass. The systems may use direct combustion, gasification, combined heat and power (CHP), anaerobic digestion or aerobic digestion to produce heat. Biomass heating may be fully automated or semi-automated they may be pellet-fired, or they may be combined heat and power systems .

== Types ==
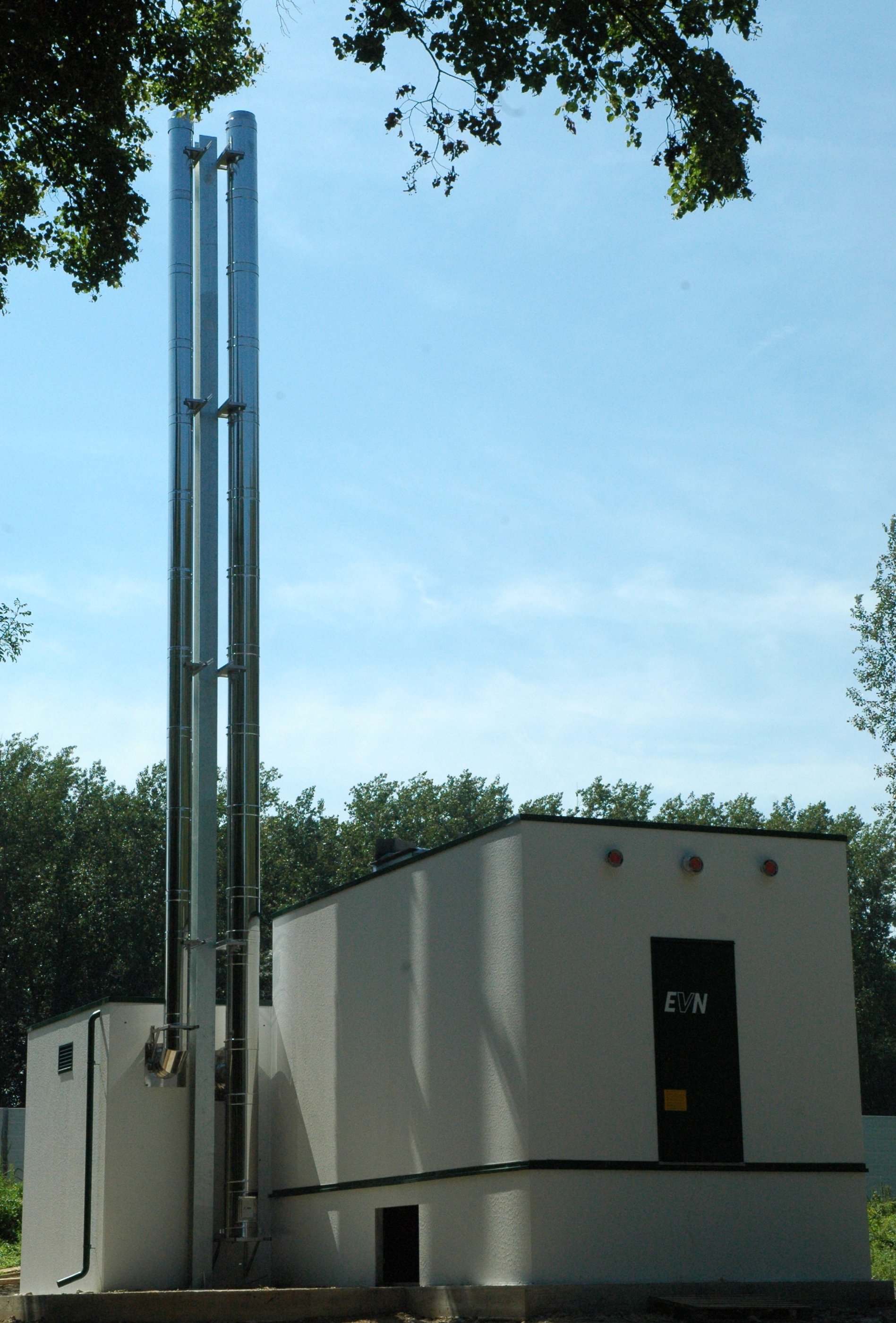
Biomass heating plant in Austria; the heat power is about 1000 kW

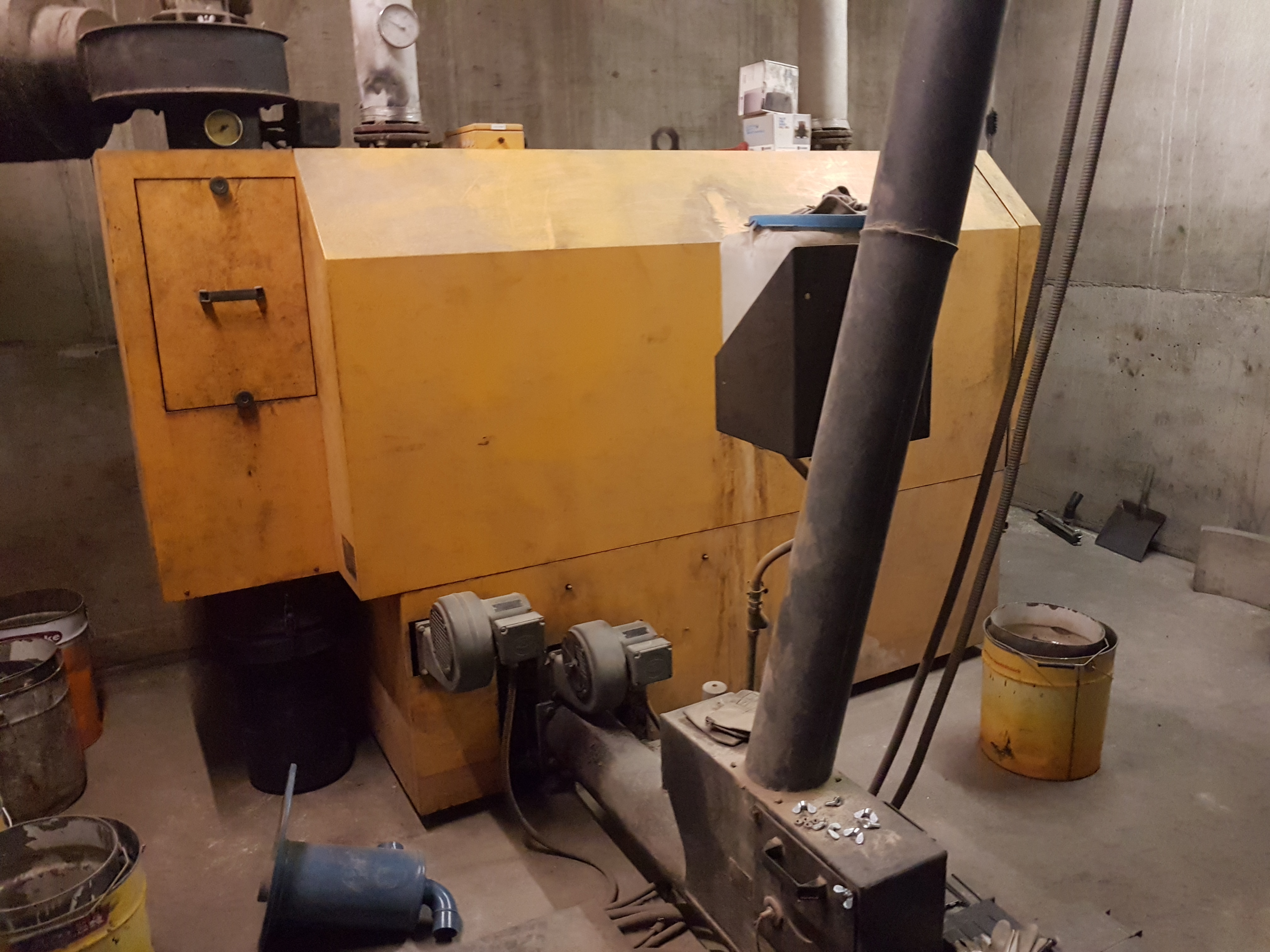
Fully automatic 140 kW wood chip heating system in Austria. 35 years old.

There are four main types of heating systems that use biomass to heat a boiler. The types of biomass heating are fully automated, semi-automated, pellet-fired, and combined heat and power.

=== Fully automated ===
In fully automated systems chipped or ground up biomass is fed to the boiler via conveyors at a managed rate. This rate is managed by computer controls to maintain the pressure and temperature within the boiler. Fully automated systems offer a great deal of ease in their operation because they only require the operator of the system to control the computer.

=== Semi-automated or "surge bin" ===
Semi-automated or "Surge Bin" systems are very similar to fully automated systems except they require more manpower to keep operational. They have smaller holding tanks, and a much simpler conveyor system which, will require personnel to maintain the systems operation. The reasoning for the changes from the fully automated system is the efficiency of the system. The heat created by the combustor can be used to directly heat the air or it can be used to heat water in a boiler system which acts as the medium by which the heat is delivered. Wood fire fuelled boilers are most efficient when they are running at their highest capacity, and the heat required most days of the year will not be the peak heat requirement for the year. Considering that the system will only need to run at a high capacity a few days of the year, it is made to meet the requirements for the majority of the year to maintain its high efficiency.

=== Pellet-fired ===
The third main type of biomass heating systems are pellet-fired systems. Pellets are a processed form of wood, which make them more expensive. Although they are more expensive, they are much more condensed and uniform, and therefore are more efficient. Further, it is relatively easy to automatically feed pellets to boilers. In these systems, the pellets are stored in a grain-type storage silo, and gravity is used to move them to the boiler. The storage requirements are much smaller for pellet-fired systems because of their condensed nature, which also helps cut down costs. these systems are used for a wide variety of facilities, but they are most efficient and cost effective for places where space for storage and conveyor systems is limited, and where the pellets are made fairly close to the facility.

==== Agricultural pellet systems ====
One subcategory of pellet systems are boilers or burners capable of burning pellet with higher ash rate (paper pellets, hay pellets, straw pellets). One of this kind is PETROJET pellet burner with rotating cylindrical burning chamber. In terms of efficiencies advanced pellet boilers can exceed other forms of biomass because of the more stable fuel characteristics. Advanced pellet boilers can even work in condensing mode and cool down combustion gases to 30-40 °C, instead of 120 °C before sent into the flue.

=== Combined heat and power ===
Combined heat and power systems are very useful systems in which wood waste, such as wood chips, is used to generate power, and heat is created as a byproduct of the power generation system. They have a very high cost because of the high pressure operation. Because of this high pressure operation, the need for a highly trained operator is mandatory, and will raise the cost of operation. Another drawback is that while they produce electricity they will produce heat, and if producing heat is not desirable for certain parts of the year, the addition of a cooling tower is necessary, and will also raise the cost.

There are certain situations where CHP is a good option. Wood product manufacturers would use a combined heat and power system because they have a large supply of waste wood, and a need for both heat and power. Other places where these systems would be optimal are hospitals and prisons, which need energy, and heat for hot water. These systems are sized so that they will produce enough heat to match the average heat load so that no additional heat is needed, and a cooling tower is not needed.

== District heating ==
Biomass heating plants can supply groups of buildings, or whole villages and towns through district heating networks. Insulated pipes carry hot water to the buildings and fuel deliveries together with boiler maintenance take place at the central plant. The network requires additional investment in pipes, and some heat is lost before reaching the buildings.

Some straw-fired boilers take whole bales. Wood chips and pellets can be fed from storage by screw conveyors. Part of the heat released during combustion evaporates moisture in the fuel, leaving less heat available for heating.

Heat demand is usually higher in winter. At low demand, frequent boiler starts and stops can impact efficiency and increase emissions. Thermal storage lets the boiler produce heat ahead of demand, while a second boiler can supply extra heat in cold weather.

== Benefits ==
The use of biomass in heating systems is beneficial because it uses agricultural, forest, urban and industrial residues and waste to produce heat and/or electricity with less effect on the environment than fossil fuels. This type of energy production has a limited long-term effect on the environment because the carbon in biomass is part of the natural carbon cycle; while the carbon in fossil fuels is not, and permanently adds carbon to the environment when burned for fuel (carbon footprint). Historically, before the use of fossil fuels in significant quantities, biomass in the form of wood fuel provided most of humanity's heating.

Because forest based biomass is typically derived from wood that has lower commercial value, forest biomass is typically harvested as a byproduct of other timber harvest operations. Biomass heating provides markets for lower value wood, which enables healthy and profitable forest management.

== Drawbacks ==
On a large scale, the use of agricultural biomass removes agricultural land from food production, reduces the carbon sequestration capacity of forests that are not managed sustainably, and extracts nutrients from the soil. Combustion of biomass creates air pollutants and adds significant quantities of carbon to the atmosphere that may not be returned to the soil for many decades. The time delay between when biomass is burned and the time when carbon is pulled from the atmosphere as a plant or tree grows to replace it is known as carbon debt. The concept of carbon debt is subject to debate. Actual carbon impacts may be subject to philosophy, scale of harvest, land type, biomass type (grass, maize, new wood, waste wood, algae, for example), soil type, and other factors.

Using biomass as a fuel produces air pollution in the form of carbon monoxide, NOx (nitrogen oxides), VOCs (volatile organic compounds), particulates and other pollutants, in some cases at levels above those from traditional fuel sources such as coal or natural gas. Black carbon – a pollutant created by incomplete combustion of fossil fuels, biofuels, and biomass – is possibly the second largest contributor to global warming. In 2009 a Swedish study of the giant brown haze that periodically covers large areas in South Asia determined that it had been principally produced by biomass burning, and to a lesser extent by fossil-fuel burning. Researchers measured a significant concentration of ^{14}C, which is associated with recent plant life rather than with fossil fuels. Modern biomass burning appliances dramatically reduce harmful emissions with advanced technology such as oxygen trim systems.

On combustion, the carbon from biomass is released into the atmosphere as carbon dioxide (CO_{2}). The amount of carbon stored in dry wood is approximately 50% by weight. When from agricultural sources, plant matter used as a fuel can be replaced by planting for new growth. When the biomass is from forests, the time to recapture the carbon stored is generally longer, and the carbon storage capacity of the forest may be reduced overall if destructive forestry techniques are employed.

The forest biomass-is-carbon-neutral proposal put forward in the early 1990s has been superseded by more recent science that recognizes that mature, intact forests sequester carbon more effectively than cut-over areas. When a tree's carbon is released into the atmosphere in a single pulse, it contributes to climate change much more than woodland timber rotting slowly over decades. Some studies indicate that "even after 50 years the forest has not recovered to its initial carbon storage" and "the optimal strategy is likely to be protection of the standing forest". Other studies show that carbon storage is dependent upon the forest and the use of the harvested biomass. Forests are often managed for multiple aged trees with more frequent, smaller harvests of mature trees. These forests interact with carbon differently than mature forests that are clear-cut. Also, the more efficient the conversion of wood to energy, the less wood that is used and shorter the carbon cycle will be.

== Scale ==
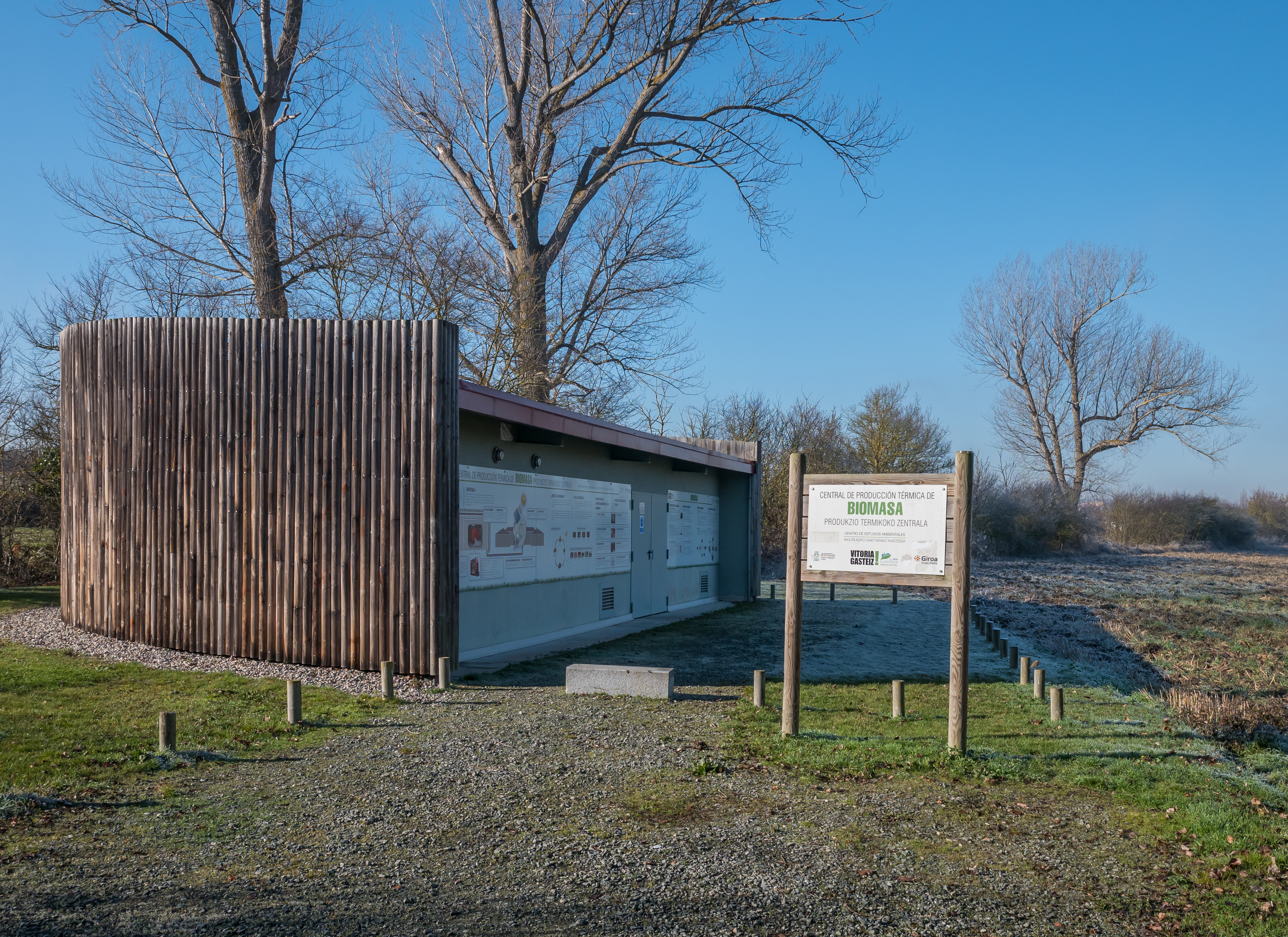
Biomass heating system for one building complex in the Spanish Basque Country

The oil price increases since 2003 and consequent price increases for natural gas and coal have increased the value of biomass for heat generation. Forest renderings, agricultural waste, and crops grown specifically for energy production become competitive as the prices of energy dense fossil fuels rise. Efforts to develop this potential may have the effect of regenerating mismanaged croplands and be a cog in the wheel of a decentralized, multi-dimensional renewable energy industry. Efforts to promote and advance these methods became common throughout the European Union through the 2000s. In other areas of the world, inefficient and polluting means to generate heat from biomass coupled with poor forest practices have significantly added to environmental degradation.

== See also ==
- Wood fuel
