= Solarcentury =

Solar energy company

- Founded: 1998
- Headquarters: UK
- Key people: Jeremy Leggett (founder)
- Revenue: £168 million
- Website: https://www.statkraft.co.uk

Solarcentury was the UK's largest solar company. Solarcentury was founded in 1998 by former oil geologist Jeremy Leggett, and had an annual turnover of £168 million in 2015–16.

The company were in partnership with Panama-based private equity firm ECOSolar, and had acquired the 400MW Divisa Project in Panama.

Solarcentury gave a 5% share of profits to SolarAid, a charity founded by Solarcentury in 2006, that supplies mini home-solar installations in Africa on a pay as you go basis.

Solarcentury was bought by Statkraft in November 2020 for £118 million.

== History ==
In May 2017, the company announced that it was shifting its focus from the UK, where 85% of its business is, and pursuing £3 billion of projects in Latin America and Europe.

In 2019 Solarcentury announced an eightfold increase in annual profits to £14.4 million, largely due to constructing and operating unsubsidised solar farms in southern Europe, Latin America and Africa.

In November 2020, the Norwegian renewables company Statkraft announced it had acquired Solarcentury, taking full control of the company.
