= Low Carbon Building Programme =

UK government programme

The Low Carbon Building Programme (LCBP) was a payments system in England, Scotland and Wales. The UK Government programme was administered by BERR (formerly the DTI) and ran from 1 April 2006 until its closure to new applications on 24 May 2010. The scheme was replaced by the Renewable Heat Incentive in November 2011.

== Operation ==
The LCBP offered grants towards the cost of installing domestic microgeneration technologies and larger scale distributed generation installations for public buildings and businesses, subject to energy conservation standards being met. The programme was split into two phases - phase one, managed by the Energy Saving Trust, divided into two streams, provided grants for householders under stream 1, and grants for businesses under stream 2. Phase two, launched in 2007 and managed by the Building Research Establishment, provided grants for public sector, charitable and third sector organisations.

Grants were only offered to installations using products and installers either on "Clear Skies" lists or products and installers assessed and certificated to robust standards under the new Microgeneration Certification Scheme mark (or its equivalent, for products). The first company in the United Kingdom, to install a solar heating system under the Clear Skies Grant Scheme was Eco-Exmoor Ltd.

=== Grants ===
Grants were normally in the 10 to 50% range, according to the applicant and the technology. Funding for domestic schemes, restricted to £500,000 per month and allocated on a first-come-first served basis, was well below demand. In January 2007 funds were exhausted within 12 days, and in March 2007 within 75 minutes.

Although funding in the 2007 financial year was increased, as detailed below, there were no domestic grant allocations in April 2007 as the scheme was suspended while it was restructured. The suspension lead to a sudden drop in demand and job losses in the industry.

The revised domestic scheme, launched on 29 May 2007, cut the maximum grant by 50% to £2,500, and required the householder to complete the works within strict time limits.

=== Funding ===
Funding for the LCBP was originally set at £30 million for the first three years. £6.5m of this was allocated for domestic installations, £4 million for community installations and £18 million for others, while £1.5 million was reallocated to plug the financial gap that appeared between the earlier programmes ending and the start of the Low Carbon Building Programme.

A further £50 million was announced in the April 2006 budget, which was used to establish phase two of the programme. Phase two used a framework of suppliers and products which had to be used by applicants when applying for a grant. The framework was established through an OJEU tender process, with the intention of providing certainty to the industry and further reducing technology costs through economies of scale.

The schemes replaced by the Low Carbon Building Programme were also seen as being under funded, with only £45 million having been invested in them. The Solar PV programme was originally intended to ‘establish the UK as a credible player.... alongside Germany and Japan’, however in 2004 the UK installed 2.5 MW of photovoltaic electricity capacity, compared to over 300 MW in Germany.

On 21 March 2007, it was announced in the Chancellor of the Exchequer's Budget Statement that the funding of grants for homes would be increased again to £18 million in the new financial year for a new, restructured, scheme.

=== Closure ===
The LCBP was closed to new applications on 24 May 2010, as part of a plan by the Department of Energy and Climate Change to cut £85 million from its budget as its contribution towards the Coalition Government's spending cuts.

== Previous schemes ==
The LCBP replaced two earlier schemes, the 'Major Photovoltaics Demonstration programme', which assisted with photovoltaic installations, and the 'Clear Skies' programme, which aided other microgeneration installations.

The Government were criticised by the photovoltaic industry for ending the PV programme six years early. and also for allowing a funding gap to develop between the old and new programmes, which caused significant disruption to the renewables industry.

== See also ==
- Microgeneration
- Low-carbon building
- Energy efficiency in British housing
- Energy policy of the United Kingdom
- Energy use and conservation in the United Kingdom
- Climate Change and Sustainable Energy Act 2006
- Renewable energy in the European Union
- Code for Sustainable Homes
