= Green electricity in the United Kingdom =

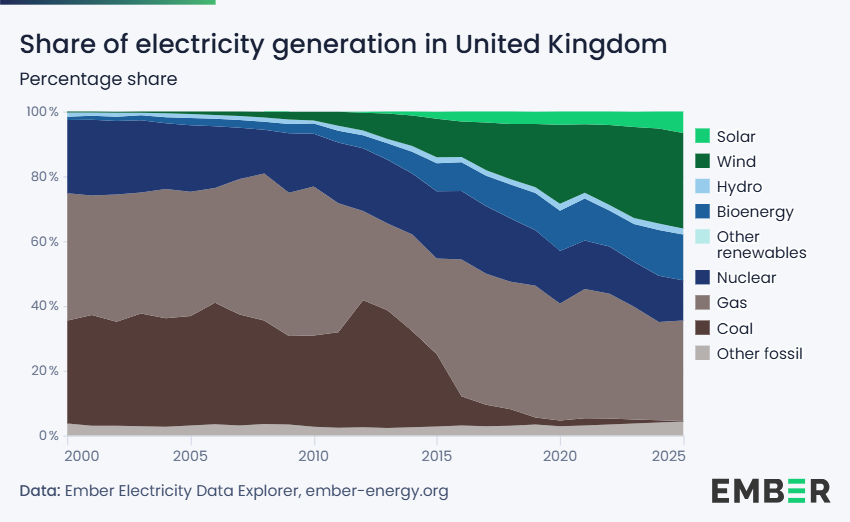
United Kingdom electricity generation by source: percentage share, 2000–2025

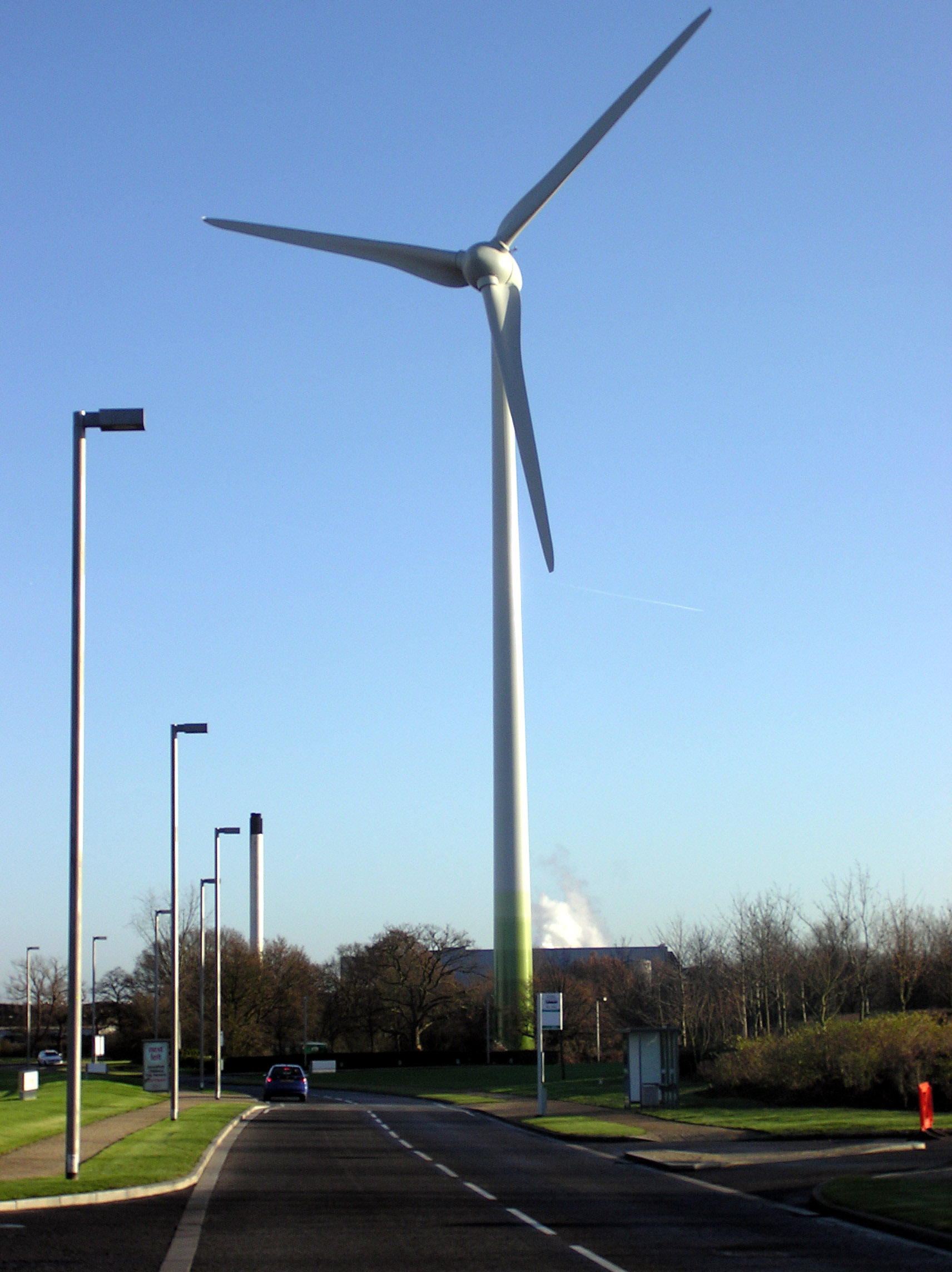
A wind turbine at Greenpark, Reading, England, generating green electricity for approx 1000 homes.

The availability and uptake of green electricity in the United Kingdom has increased in the 21st century. There are a number of suppliers offering green electricity in the United Kingdom. In theory these types of tariffs help to lower carbon dioxide emissions by increasing consumer demand for green electricity and encouraging more renewable energy plant to be built. Since Ofgem's 2014 regulations, there have been set criteria defining what can be classified as a green source product. As well as holding sufficient guarantee of origin certificates to cover the electricity sold to consumers, suppliers are also required to show additionality by contributing to wider environmental and low carbon funds.

Care needs to be taken in selecting a green energy supplier. A National Consumer Council report in December 2006 concluded that many green tariffs are not delivering the environmental benefits they claim to, and that consumers may not be making the positive contribution they think they are.

== Shades of green ==
=== Renewables Obligation ===
In the United Kingdom, suppliers are legally obliged to purchase a proportion of their electricity from renewable sources under the Renewables Obligation and there is a danger that energy suppliers may sell such green electricity under a premium 'green energy' tariff, rather than sourcing additional green electricity supplies. In addition to selling the green electricity to the consumer, it is also possible for the supplier to sell the associated Renewables Obligation Certificates to another supplier who has failed to meet their quota, rather than 'retiring' the certificate from the marketplace.

On several occasions in May 2016, Britain burned no coal for electricity for the first time since 1882. In April 2018, Britain burned no coal for a period of 76 hours, from 10 am 21 April to 10 am 24 April – the longest period since the 19th century.

=== Climate Change Levy ===
Non-domestic consumers can avoid paying the Climate Change Levy by acquiring Levy Exemption Certificates from renewable energy suppliers. Since these are not required by domestic consumers, it is possible for the supplier to sell the certificates to the non-domestic sector, as well as selling the renewables obligation certificate and the electricity.

=== Carbon offsetting ===
Prior to the OFGEM green supply regulations, some green energy tariffs involved carbon offsetting, rather than purchasing or investing in renewable energy, a practice that does not meet with universal approval. George Monbiot, an English environmentalist and writer, has compared carbon offsets to the practice of purchasing indulgences during the Middle Ages, whereby people believed they could purchase forgiveness for their sins (instead of actually repenting and not sinning anymore). Monbiot also says that carbon offsets are an excuse for business as usual with regard to pollution.

=== Reporting requirements ===
In June 2008, Defra announced that, with effect from the financial year 2008–19, Green Electricity is to be treated the same as average grid electricity for carbon dioxide (CO_{2}) reporting purposes. Previously, it was treated as if there were no CO_{2} emissions associated with it.

Explaining the change, the Minister then responsible (Hilary Benn) said "I want to make sure that the green tariff market, which has grown rapidly over recent years, is clear for consumers and businesses about the precise benefit their tariff brings. Many energy suppliers offer green tariffs to businesses and domestic customers who want to make a contribution to environmental projects or help tackle climate change, but these differ in what they deliver." He added "It is increasingly difficult to demonstrate that buying a renewable electricity tariff is offering additional carbon emissions reductions compared with what suppliers are required to source to meet the Renewables Obligation. I have therefore decided that we will change the voluntary corporate reporting guidelines to bring them into line with current best practice and provide coherent carbon accounting. This will mean that for the reporting year 2008–2009, best practice is expected to be for businesses to use a grid average rate – average rate of carbon emissions associated with electricity transmitted on the national grid – unless their supplier can prove the carbon benefits are additional." This does not affect green electricity generated on site (e.g. from photovoltaics or a micro-wind turbine), which can continue to be reported as producing zero emissions.

== Certification schemes ==
In 1999, the Future Energy national certification scheme for green electricity was launched, however it was closed in 2002, apparently because too few suppliers were prepared to accept the proposed revised requirements.

In the absence of a replacement national scheme in the UK, the international Eugene Network, whose main purpose was to give accreditation to national green energy schemes, supported Ecotricity and indicates that Good Energy would be ready for accreditation should a Eugene Standard compliant scheme be introduced in the UK. The Eugene standard was discontinued in February 2009, leaving no internationally recognised means of comparing green electricity.

=== Ofgem 2007–2008 proposals ===
In an attempt to end some of the premium priced offerings by suppliers which were doing no more than repackaging electricity that they had to buy under the Renewables Obligation, the UK Government's Office of Gas and Electricity Markets Ofgem proposed a voluntary scheme for independently verified energy ratings for electricity suppliers. Initially this was intended to include a detailed analysis of the carbon content of the supply, but some critics felt that this lacked sufficient emphasis on additionality, and the actual energy used by consumers from the grid was always a mix of brown and green sources.

After running a series of workshops in early 2008, their proposals turned away from a focus on the source of electricity (and its associated carbon dioxide emissions), to look instead at whether an environmental benefit is demonstrated. Essentially, Ofgem suggest that this can only be done if the supplier invests part of payment received into one of the following activities:

- installation of energy efficiency technologies (outside of the Carbon Emission Reduction Target - CERT programme);
- other consumer behaviour measures, such as active demand management or voluntary smart metering;
- support for renewable heat installations;
- additional investment in smaller-scale (e.g. community based) renewable electricity projects – a limit of 1 MW has been suggested for wind farms - or in other low carbon sources including CHP and nuclear;
- retirement of EU allowances under the EU Emissions Trading Scheme (EU ETS);
- purchase of carbon offsets in line with Defra’s Quality Assurance Scheme for Carbon Offsetting, typically offsets from developing countries under the Clean Development Mechanism;
- research and development into emerging renewable technologies; or
- contribution to an environmental charity.

The initial draft of the guidelines would have excluded most of the products currently available on the UK market, including offerings from renewable energy specialists Good Energy and Ecotricity.

=== Green Energy Supply Certification Scheme ===
After consultation, Ofgem introduced modified Guidelines in February 2009. These placed a greater emphasis on the matching principle, requiring that all electricity sold under the Scheme had to be matched by supplies from renewable sources (and excluding other low-carbon sources such as CHP or nuclear). The additionality criteria were simplified slightly to comprise:

- carbon offsets accredited either under the UK Government's Quality Assurance Scheme (QAS) or under the Gold Standard
- green energy schemes, mainly those that donate money to charities or to trust funds established to invest in new renewable projects – generally at a community level, and required to be independent of the suppliers
- energy efficiency schemes, making savings above those from CERT including savings in customers' premises through lower energy use
- unspecified other measures, producing equivalent carbon savings

Certified tariffs were subject to an annual audit, to ensure that the matching and additionality criteria have been met. Consumers must also be given information on the suppliers overall fuel mix at the point of sale. Although aimed mainly at domestic consumers, the scheme can also certify tariffs aimed at small businesses with an annual energy consumption below 50,000 kWh.

The scheme was launched in February 2010, with the UK's Big Six energy suppliers as members as well as Good Energy. Ecotricity elected not to join the scheme citing concerns about the additionality rules. All suppliers offer domestic tariffs, but only some have offered small business tariffs under the scheme.

The scheme, which closed in 2015, was controlled by an independent Panel chaired by Solitaire Townsend, and the National Energy Foundation were appointed as the secretariat.

== Current OFGEM regulation ==
In response to concerns about the lack of regulation in the market for green electricity tariffs and in order to protect consumers, OFGEM has consulted and enacted changes to the green tariff market in the UK. Whereas previously the green tariff products were not subject to specific regulations, all retailers must now prove the green credentials of their products to OFGEM. The regulations have three components:

1. Electricity source - retailers need to hold sufficient Renewable Energy Guarantee of Origin Certificates to match the quantity of electricity sold. Retailers are required to submit proof of this to the regulator.
2. Additionality - retailers also need to invest additional funds into other environmental projects.
3. Transparency - retailers are required to inform consumers of how their tariffs benefit the environment.

== Areas of controversy ==
There have been several areas of controversy regarding green electricity sales in the UK. These have been related to both the concept as a whole, which has been subject to criticism, but have usually manifested as disputes between the two leading green electricity companies.

=== Retirement of Renewable Obligation Certificates (ROCs) ===
In 2009, the founder of Ecotricity, Dale Vince, criticised Good Energy for their failure to retire a sufficient quantity of ROCs. Good Energy had previously promised to retire 5% of its ROCs, but Vince claimed they had consistently retired fewer ROCs than promised. He backed this up with evidence from OFGEM. It appears that after this dispute Good Energy did increase the number of ROCs it retired, but now seems to have ceased to do this entirely.

=== Advertising Standards Authority case ===
In 2016, Ecotricity claimed in an advertisement that it was the greenest energy supplier. This claim was disputed by Tesla Motors and subsequently thrown out. The judgement faced criticism from Good Energy, with its managing director David Brooks saying “The ASA appears to have based its decision purely on data provided by Ecotricity without considering whether that data represents an objective view. Obviously, the criteria Ecotricity has chosen to measure itself against other companies has been selected to suit Ecotricity. We don’t think the ASA has considered what it calls “suitable comparative data” before reaching its conclusions."

=== Wood burning ===
In the UK, wood counts as a renewable fuel and the Drax power station burns a large mass of it. Biofuelwatch has criticised this wood burning, saying "In return for trashing forests and digging up communities, Drax is receiving massive subsidies, when it should have been closed down years ago".

== Suppliers offering green–source products ==
- Co-op Energy
- Ecotricity
- Good Energy
- Green Energy
- Octopus Energy
- Opus Energy
- Outfox the Market
- OVO Energy
- Shell Energy
- So Energy
- F&S Energy

== See also ==
- Renewable energy in the United Kingdom
- Energy use and conservation in the United Kingdom
- Sustainable energy
- Energy conservation
- Microgeneration
- Renewable energy
- Renewable heat
