= Renewable Energy Certificate System =

The Renewable Energy Certificate System (RECS) was a voluntary system for international trade in renewable energy certificates that was created by RECS International to stimulate the international development of renewable energy. It advocated the use of a standard energy certificate to provide evidence of the production of a quantity of renewable energy and provided a methodology that enables renewable energy trade, enabling the creation of a market for renewable energy and so promoting the development of new renewable energy capacity.

A RECS energy certificate was issued for every 1 megawatt-hour (MWh) of renewable energy produced by an electricity generation facility that was registered with the relevant national RECS issuing body. These certificates could be transferred between market parties in different countries and were used to provide evidence of the consumption of renewable energy – at which point they were made non-transferable, in order to ensure that the "renewable benefit" was not double-sold.

While RECS guaranteed the source of the energy and prevented double-counting, it was not a label: these also guarantee other matters relating to the supplied electricity, such as the originating technology, the age of the plant, and the source of the energy. Labels must also ensure that sales of labelled electricity either do not change the blend of sources of electricity that is supplied unlabelled, or that the buyers of such electricity are informed accordingly.

The market for RECS certificates was administered by the Association of Issuing Bodies (AIB) according to its European Energy Certificate System (EECS), in the same way as the obligatory guarantees of origin required by the various European Union Directives that have now replaced voluntary RECS certificates in Europe.

== Limits of RECS ==
Several non-governmental environmental organizations like Greenpeace and the World Wide Fund for Nature claimed that in practice there was no ecological benefit ensured by this certification method alone. While the demand for this certification method did not exceed supply by renewable energy power plants which had already existed for decades, it was criticized as being a pure mind-game: in practice, the amount of renewable source electricity that was assigned to certificate buyers was just "assigned away" from the other power consumers; and in total, nothing had changed. Indeed, some electricity traders misuse RECS certificates that they bought from old renewable source electricity power plants that had existed for years to imply misleadingly that buying their "RECS certified regenerative electricity" made a change to the environment.

== Safeguards against misuse ==
Reputable eco-friendly electricity labels ensure an ecological benefit in practice. Some reputable labels (like the WWF co-funded German "ok-power" label) also used RECS, but only as a broadly-accepted accounting and tracking system (to register the power plants against double-selling); other labels required direct contracts for delivery with the plant as an alternative. The crux of such efforts was to additionally insist that the certificate-selling or directly contracted power plant met important eco-orientated standards; those standards typically encompassing a maximum age of the power plant (to ensure that new power plants are built) and the banning of power plants that act against landscape or animal protection. Other labels co-issued by environmental organizations required that a part of the fee of every kWh be donated for investment in new eco-friendly power plants or technology.

In the United States, certified REC seller Arcadia Power bought certificates exclusively from projects located within the same ISO/RTO grid as the purchaser and which were produced within five years of sale. Primarily catering to residences and small businesses, the company provided customers with details about the wind or solar farm where their RECS certificates were generated.

== See also ==
- Renewable Energy Certificate (United States)
