= Future Energy =

Future Energy is a former accreditation scheme for green electricity in the United Kingdom, designed to support and stimulate electricity generation from renewable energy sources. The scheme was launched in 1999 and was operated by the Energy Saving Trust until funding expired in 2002.

It is thought that funding was not renewed due to few suppliers were prepared to accept the new requirements for green tariffs proposed by the Trust following the introduction of the Renewables Obligation. As of 2007 the scheme has not been replaced, although Friends of the Earth, who used to run their own scheme, have been among those calling on the government to do so.

== See also ==
- Energy policy of the United Kingdom
- Green electricity in the United Kingdom
- Electricity retailing
- Energy conservation
- Environmental concerns with electricity generation
- Eugene Green Energy Standard
- Low-carbon economy
- Category:Renewable energy in the United Kingdom
