= Renewable portfolio standards in the United States =

Regulation encouraging renewable energy

A Renewable Portfolio Standard (RPS) is a regulation that requires the increased production of energy from renewable energy sources, such as wind, solar, biomass, and geothermal, which have been adopted in 38 of 50 U.S. states and the District of Columbia. The United States federal RPS is called the Renewable Electricity Standard (RES). Several states have clean energy standards, which also allow for resources that do not produce emissions, such as large hydropower and nuclear power.

The RPS mechanism generally places an obligation on electricity supply companies to produce a specified fraction of their electricity from renewable energy sources. Certified renewable energy generators earn certificates for every unit of electricity they produce and can sell these along with their electricity to supply companies. Supply companies then pass the certificates to some form of regulatory body to demonstrate their compliance with their regulatory obligations. Because it is a market mandate, the RPS relies almost entirely on the private market for its implementation. Unlike feed-in tariffs which guarantee purchase of all renewable energy regardless of cost, RPS programs tend to allow more price competition between different types of renewable energy, but can be limited in competition through eligibility and multipliers for RPS programs. Those supporting the adoption of RPS mechanisms claim that market implementation will result in competition, efficiency, and innovation that will deliver renewable energy at the lowest possible cost, allowing renewable energy to compete with cheaper fossil fuel energy sources.

== Program diversity ==
Of all the state-based RPS programs in place today, no two are the same. Each has been designed taking into account state-specific policy objectives (e.g. economic growth, diversity of energy supply, environmental concerns), local resource endowment, political considerations, and the capacity to expand renewable energy production. At the most basic level, this gives rise to differing RPS targets and years (e.g. Arizona's 15% by 2025 and Colorado's 30% by 2020). Other factors in program design include resource eligibility, in-state requirements, new build requirements, technology favoritism, lobbying by industry associations and non-profits, groups cost caps, program coverage (IOUs versus Cooperatives and Municipal utilities), cost recovery by utilities, penalties for non-compliance, rules regarding REC creation and trading, and additional non-binding goals. Since RPS programs create a mandate to purchase renewable energy, they create a lucrative captive market of buyers for renewable energy producers who are eligible in a particular state's RPS program to issue RECs. A state may choose to promote new investment in renewable energy generation capacity by not making eligible existing renewable energy such as hydroelectric plants or geothermal energy to qualify under an RPS program.

Many states that have mandatory Renewable Portfolio Standards also have additional voluntary targets either for the total proportion of renewable energy or for a particular technology type.

In many states, municipalities and cooperatives are exempt from the RPS target, have a lower target, or are required to develop their own targets. Furthermore, in some states such as Minnesota, individual utilities (e.g., Xcel Energy) are singled out for special treatment.

== Renewable energy certificates (RECs) ==
States with RPS programs have associated renewable energy certificate trading programs. RECs provide a mechanism by which to track the amount of renewable power being sold and to financially reward eligible power producers. For each unit of power that an eligible producer generates, a certificate or credit is issued. These can then be sold either in conjunction with the underlying power or separately to energy supply companies. A market exists for RECs because energy supply companies are required to redeem certificates equal to their obligation under the RPS program. State specific programs or various applications (e.g., WREGIS, M-RETS, NEPOOL GIS) are used to track REC issuance and ownership. These credits can in some programs be 'banked' (for use in future years) or borrowed (to meet current year commitments). There is a great deal of variety among the states in the handling and functioning of RECs and this will be a major issue in integrating state and federal programs.

=== Multipliers ===
RPS multipliers adjust the amount of renewable energy credits (RECs) awarded (up or down) for each MWh of electricity produced based on its source. Since the definition of what is considered "renewable energy" varies, for example, nuclear power, and whether an RPS program should consider environmental damage of a renewable energy source (for example, hydroelectric dams, bird strikes of wind turbines, geothermal earthquakes, solar thermal water use) affects RPS program design and implementation. A state can use a multiplier as protectionism to local renewable energy generators from out of state renewable generators. Since RECs are regulated at a state level, their ability to be traded over state lines varies.

=== Solar renewable energy certificates (SRECs) ===
Over 16 of the approximately 30 states with RPS programs have also established a set-aside for solar energy. This results in the creation and trading of RECs specific to solar known as solar renewable energy certificates (SRECs). With a separate market for SRECs, states are able to ensure that a portion of their renewable energy comes from solar. As a result, states with solar carve-outs, such as New Jersey, have had more success in promoting solar energy through the RPS than states, such as Texas, with a generic REC market or REC multiplier.

=== Tiers and set-asides ===
Energy supply companies need to show that they have acquired a particular percentage of their power sales from the designated technology type. Multiple technology types are bundled together in tiers or classes with similar effect. Not all states have set-asides or tiers (some preferring to promote particular technologies through credit multipliers) and each state that groups technologies together in a tier does so differently.

=== Eligible technologies ===
Every state defines renewable technologies differently. Many states exclude existing renewable facilities from benefiting from an RPS program. A state's definition of eligible technologies is also driven by the objectives of the program. Programs designed to promote diversity in generation types may include or promote technologies different from programs designed to achieve environmental goals.

In a 2011 report published by the Union of Concerned Scientists, Doug Koplow said:

Nuclear power should not be eligible for inclusion in a renewable portfolio standard. Nuclear power is an established, mature technology with a long history of government support. Furthermore, nuclear plants are unique in their potential to cause catastrophic damage (due to accidents, sabotage, or terrorism); to produce very long-lived radioactive wastes; and to exacerbate nuclear proliferation.

=== Penalties ===
In order to motivate compliance, states that have enforceable standards will have penalties for utilities that fail to reach the specified targets. States may choose to set penalty values or make arbitrary penalty amounts when suppliers fail to meet a renewable target. Where specific technologies are promoted through either tiers or set-aside provisions, the penalties for missing these targets are typically separate and higher. Some states have higher penalties for repeat violations and others escalate penalties on a yearly basis according to price indices.

=== Cost caps ===
All states either place caps on the cost of the program or include some form of 'escape clause' whereby the regulatory authority can suspend the program or exempt utilities from meeting its requirements. The need for such measures arises from the difficulties in estimating in advance the actual cost of the RPS program. The realized cost to the utility and the ratepayer is not known until the supply and cost base of renewable power, along with actual demand, is established. However, likely costs can be estimated, and some states appear to have set cost caps low enough that complete RPS requirements could not be fulfilled without a significant decrease in renewables costs.

=== Cost recovery ===
With few exceptions, utilities are allowed to recover the additional cost of procuring renewable power. The method by which this can be achieved varies by state. Some states opt for a ratepayer surcharge while others require utilities to include costs in rate base. In some instances, utilities are even able to recover the cost of penalties associated with non-compliance.

=== Policy by jurisdiction ===
==== Federal ====
Public Utility Regulatory Policies Act is a law passed in 1978 by the United States Congress as part of the National Energy Act that is meant to promote greater use of renewable energy.

In 2009, the US Congress considered Federal level RPS requirements. The American Clean Energy and Security Act reported out of committee in July by the Senate Committee on Energy & Natural Resources includes a Renewable Electricity Standard that calls for 3% of U.S. electrical generation to come from non-hydro renewables by 2011–2013. However, the proposed Support Renewable Energy Act died in the 111th Congress.

In 2007, the Edison Electric Institute, a trade association for America's investor-owned utilities, reiterated their continuing opposition to a nationwide RPS; among the reasons included were that it conflicts with and preempts existing RES programs passed in many states, it does not adequately consider the uneven distribution of renewable resources across the country, and it creates inequities among utility customers, by specifically exempting all rural electric cooperatives, and government-owned utilities from the RES mandate.

The American Legislative Exchange Council (ALEC) drafted the model bill Electricity Freedom Act, which ALEC affiliate representatives are attempted to roll out in various states and which "would end requirements for states to derive a specific percentage of their electricity needs from renewable energy sources." As a result, of being unable to stop the approval of this model legislation, the American Wind Energy Association and the Solar Energy Industry Association allowed their ALEC membership lapse after one year as members.

Different state RPS programs issue a different number of Renewable Energy Credits depending on the generation technology; for example, solar generation counts for twice as much as other renewable sources in Michigan and Virginia.

==== State ====
General citation: States with active RPSes that have not yet been met are in bold.

State	Amount	Year	Notes
**Arizona**	100%	2070	
**California**	100%	2045	100% clean energy requirement includes all non-emitting sources beyond just renewables. Interim target of 60% renewables by 2030.
**Colorado**	100%	2050	100% clean for large utilities.
**Connecticut**	48%	2030	
**District of Columbia**	100%	2032	
**Delaware**	25%	2025	Suppliers will receive 300% credit toward RPS compliance for in-state customer-sited photovoltaic generation and fuel cells using renewable fuels that are installed on or before December 31, 2014.
**Hawaii**	100%	2045	Interim targets of 30% by 2020, 40% by 2030, and 70% by 2040
Iowa	105 MW	1999	
**Illinois**	100%	2045	
**Maine**	100%	2050	Interim target of 80% by 2030.
**Maryland**	50%	2030	Legislation enacted May 2012 accelerated the RPS by 2 years. Of the 20% renewable target, solar power goal is 2%. Legislation enacted in February 2017 set a new RPS for 2020 of 25%. Legislation enacted in April 2019 set a new RPS for 2030 of 50% requiring 14.5% come from solar and at least 1200MW of offshore wind.
**Massachusetts**	35%	2030	Subsequently rises by 1% per year
Michigan	15%	2021	Legislation enacted in 2016 increased the previous standard from 10% by 2015 to 15% by 2021. There is an interim compliance requirement of 12.5% in 2019 and 2020.
**Minnesota**	100%	2040	100% clean by 2040, with 80% by 2030.
Missouri	15%	2021	In Nov. 2008 Missouri passed Proposition C, requiring the state's 3 largest utilities to generate or purchase at least 15% of their energy from renewable sources by 2021.
Montana	15%	2015	For compliance year 2011 through compliance year 2014, public utilities (not applicable to competitive suppliers) must purchase both the renewable-energy credits (RECs) and the electricity output from community renewable-energy projects totaling at least 50 MW in nameplate capacity.
**Nevada**	50%	2030	On April 22, 2019, Nevada raised its renewable portfolio standard to 50% by 2030 from the previous requirement of 25% by 2025.
**New Hampshire**	25.2%	2025	
**New Jersey**	50%	2030	Alternate Compliance Credits (ACP) and Solar ACPs (SACP) can be purchased by retailers and used as RECs and Solar RECs.
**New Mexico**	100%	2045	2019 law mandates 100% carbon-free electricity by 2045, with 80% from renewable sources.
**New York**	100%	2040	In January 2010, a goal of 30% by 2015. In December 2015, it was increased to 50% by 2030. In July 2019, it was increased to 100% carbon-free electricity by 2040 with a net-zero carbon economy by 2050.
North Carolina	12.5%	2021	Municipal and cooperative utilities: 10% by 2018
**Ohio**	8.5%	2026	
**Oregon**	100%	2040	
Pennsylvania	18%	2021	0.5% solar
**Puerto Rico**	100%	2050	Interim target of 40% by 2025 as well as ceasing the use of all coal power by 2028.
**Rhode Island**	100%	2030	
Texas	10,000 MW	2025	Exceeded in 2010
**Vermont**	75%	2032	
**Virginia**	100%	2045	Excludes existing nuclear.
**Washington**	100%	2045	Excludes existing large hydropower. Will eliminate coal power by 2025, require 80% clean electricity and carbon neutrality by 2030, and 100% clean electricity by 2045. The previous requirement was 15% by 2020.
Wisconsin	10%	2015	

Georgia, Indiana, Kansas, North Dakota, Oklahoma, South Dakota, and Utah have set voluntary standards; these are not shown to result in additional renewable generation installations and are not listed in this table.

===== California =====
The California Renewables Portfolio Standard was created in 2002 under Senate Bill 1078 and further accelerated in 2006 under Senate Bill 107. The bills stipulate that California electricity corporations must expand their renewable portfolio by 1% each year until reaching 20% in 2010. On November 17, 2008, Governor Arnold Schwarzenegger signed executive order S-14-08 which mandated a RPS of 33% by 2020 which sits in addition to the 20% by 2010 order. The target has been extended to 50% by 2030. In September 2018, Governor Jerry Brown signed legislation increasing the state's requirement to 100% clean energy by 2045 and increasing the interim target to 60% by 2030.

===== Colorado =====
The Colorado Renewable Portfolio Standard was updated from 20% to 30% in the 2010 Legislative Session as House Bill 1001. This increase was anticipated to increase solar industry jobs from current (2009) estimated 2,500 to 33,500 by 2020. The updated RPS is also anticipated to create an additional $4.3B (U.S.) in state revenue within the industries.

===== Michigan =====
On October 6, 2008, Public Act 295 was signed into law in the State of Michigan. This Act, known as the Clean, Renewable and Efficient Energy Act, established a Renewable Energy Standard for the State of Michigan. The Renewable Energy Standard requires Michigan electric providers to achieve a retail supply portfolio that includes at least 10% renewable energy by 2015.

A ballot proposal to raise the standard to 25% renewable energy by 2025 as a constitutional amendment was put to the voters in the November 2012 General Election as Proposal 3. A Proposal To Amend the State Constitution to Establish a Standard for Renewable Energy. The ballot proposal was defeated with over 60% opposing the proposal.

According to the State of Michigan, as of March 4, 2013 "progress toward the first compliance year in 2012 and the 10 percent renewable energy standard in 2015 is going smoothly. Michigan’s electric providers are on track to meet the 10 percent renewable energy requirement. The renewable energy standard is resulting in the development of new renewable capacity and can be credited with the development of over 1,000 MW of new renewable energy projects becoming commercially operational since the Act became law. The weighted average price of renewable energy contracts is $82.54 per MWh which is less than forecasted in REPs."

===== Nevada =====
In 1997 Nevada passed a Renewable Portfolio Standard as part of their 1997 Electric Restructuring Legislation (AB 366) It required any electric providers in the state to acquire actual renewable electric generation or purchase renewable energy credits so that each utility had 1 percent of total consumption in renewables. However, on June 8, 2001, Nevada Governor Kenny Guinn signed SB 372, at the time the country's most aggressive renewable portfolio standard. The law requires that 15 percent of all electricity generated in Nevada be derived from new renewables by the year 2013.

The 2001 revision requires that at least 5 percent of the renewable energy projects must generate electricity from solar energy, which have a credit multiplier.

In June 2005, the Nevada legislature extending the deadline and raising the requirements of the RPS to 20 percent of sales by 2015. This was further raised to 25 percent by 2025 in 2009.

===== Ohio =====
In an April 2008 unanimous vote, the Ohio legislature passed a bill requiring 25 percent of Ohio's energy to be generated from alternative and renewable sources, of which half or 12.5 percent must derive from renewable sources. In July 2019, Ohio passed House Bill 6 in order to subsidize two failing nuclear power plants and eliminate their RPS altogether at 8.5% in 2026.

===== Oregon =====
For Oregon's three largest utilities (Portland General Electric (PGE), PacifiCorp and the Eugene Water and Electric Board), the standard starts at 5% in 2011, increases to 15% in 2015, 20% in 2020, and 25% in 2025. Other electric utilities in the state, depending on size, have standards of 5% or 10% in 2025. In 2016, the target was raised to 50%, as two companies must supply 50% of Oregon's power as renewable by 2040. In 2021, the target was raised to 100% by 2040.

===== Texas =====
The Texas Renewable Portfolio Standard was originally created by Senate Bill 7 in 1999. The Texas RPS mandated that utility companies jointly create 2000 new MWs of renewables by 2009 based on their market share. In 2005, Senate Bill 20, increased the state's RPS requirement to 5,880 MW by 2015, of which, 500 MW must come from non-wind resources. The bill set a goal of 10,000 MW of renewable energy capacity for 2025. The state's installed capacity reached the 10,000 MW target in early 2010, 15 years ahead of schedule.

== See also ==
- List of U.S. states by electricity production from renewable sources
- Net metering
- Power purchase agreement
- Project finance
- Renewable electricity
- Renewables Obligation
