= RECS International =

RECS International was founded in Brussels in 2002 and is a non-profit-making European association of market players trading in renewable energy certificates. Its members are renewable energy producers, traders, suppliers and brokers, mostly in Europe (but also in South Africa, US and Canada), who either wish to have a voluntary account for trading RECS certificates with their national issuing body and/or wish to influence policy at governmental and regulatory level concerning certificate trading. RECS International represents market players in discussions with national and international government, and facilitates events and activities.

RECS International works in cooperation with the Association of Issuing Bodies.
