= Fossil Fuel Levy =

United Kingdom tax

The Fossil Fuel Levy is a levy paid by suppliers of electricity from non-renewable energy sources in the United Kingdom. The costs were shared by the suppliers and consumers, as a proportion of the cost was passed on to consumers in the cost of the electricity supplied. The Fossil Fuel Levy was imposed to fund the Non-Fossil Fuel Obligation. Since April 2002 it has been set a 0% in England and Wales and in Scotland it was set at this level from November 2002.

== Legislation ==
In England and Wales the Fossil Fuel Levy was introduced under the Electricity Act 1989. Section 33 of this act was briefly superseded by the Fossil Fuel Levy Act 1998 until its repeal (by the Utilities Act 2000), bringing the Fossil Fuel Levy back under the Electricity Act.

In Scotland, the Fossil Fuel Levy was not imposed until 1996, as support for the nuclear industry in Scotland (the original purpose of the levy in England and Wales) was provided by the 1990 Scottish 'Nuclear Energy Agreement'.

== Rates ==
The Levy has been applied at various rates, but since 2002 it has been set at zero as the Climate Change Levy was introduced. Rates are controlled by Ofgem.

England and Wales
April 1, 1990	10.6%
April 1, 1991	11%
April 1, 1993	10%
November 1, 1996	3.7% (following the privatisation of British Energy )
April 1, 1997	2.2%
April 1, 1998	0.9%
January 1, 1999	0.7%
October 1, 1999	0.3%
April 1, 2002	0%
Scotland
February 16, 1996	0.5%
April 1, 1997	0.7%
April 1, 1998	0.8%
April 1, 1999?	0%
April 1, 2000	0.8%
April 1, 2001	1.2%
April 1, 2002	0.6%
November 1, 2002	0%

== See also ==
- Climate Change Levy
- Renewables Obligation Certificates
- Energy policy of the United Kingdom
- Energy use and conservation in the United Kingdom
