= Solar Renewable Energy Certificate =

Solar Renewable Energy Certificates (SRECs) or Solar Renewable Energy Credits, are a form of Renewable Energy Certificate or "green tag" existing in the United States of America. SRECs exist in states that have Renewable Portfolio Standard (RPS) legislation with specific requirements for solar energy, usually referred to as a "solar carve-out". The additional income received from selling SRECs increases the financial value of a solar investment and assists with the financing of solar technology. In conjunction with state and federal incentives, solar system owners can recover their investment in solar by selling their SRECs through spot market sales or long-term sales, both described below.

== Specifications ==
SRECs represent the environmental attributes of a solar facility and are produced every time a solar system produces one thousand kilowatt-hours (kWh) of electricity. For every 1000 kilowatt-hours of electricity produced by an eligible solar facility, one SREC is awarded. For a solar facility to be credited with that SREC, the system must be certified and registered.

=== Certification ===
To produce SRECs, a solar system must first be certified by state regulatory agencies, usually public service commissions (PSCs) or public utility commissions (PUCs), and then registered with the registry authorized by the state to create and track SRECs. Once a solar system is certified with the state agency and registered with a registry such as the PJM Generation Attribute Tracking System (PJM-GATS) or New England Power Pool Generation Information System (NEPOOL-GIS) (for Massachusetts), SRECs can be issued using either estimates or actual meter readings depending upon state regulations. In some cases, smaller installations may be able to use estimates, while actual meter readings are required for large installations. Solar installations may be registered in states other than the state in which they are physically located and many SREC aggregators will navigate the certification process on behalf of their customers to ensure that systems are certified in the states with the highest SREC values to ensure long-term price stability.

=== Solar Alternative Compliance Payment ===
Many states have a law called the Renewable Portfolio Standard (RPS), which mandates that the state's utility must produce a minimum amount of solar power every year. If they cannot do so with their power generation facilities, they must purchase SRECs. The Solar Alternative Compliance Payment (SACP) is the fee that energy suppliers must pay if they fail to secure SRECs as required by their state's RPS. Because energy suppliers and utilities may simply pay the fee if SREC prices approach the fee level, a state's ACP generally sets a cap on the value of SRECs. In rare cases, SREC prices have approached and even surpassed ACP levels because SRECs can sometimes be recovered by charging more to electricity customers (rate basing), while ACP payments are usually precluded. In many states, the SACP is scheduled to decline over time to eventually phase out the solar industry's reliance on SREC sales as an incentive for installing solar.

== Market ==
Solar RPS requirements are meant to create a marketplace for SRECs and a dynamic incentive for the solar industry. Solar RPS requirements demand that energy suppliers or utilities procure a certain percentage of electricity from qualified solar renewable energy resources in a state. These energy suppliers and/or utilities can meet solar RPS requirements by purchasing SRECs from homeowners and businesses that own solar systems and produce SRECs. Homeowners and businesses can then utilize the sale of the SRECs they generate to help finance their solar systems. SRECs can be sold in a variety of ways, such as on the spot market, at auction, or by negotiating long-term contracts.

=== Supply and demand ===
SREC supply in a particular state is determined by the number of solar installations qualified to produce SRECs and sell SRECs in that state. As more solar systems are built, SREC supply will increase. SREC demand is determined by a state's RPS solar requirement, typically a requirement that a certain percentage of the energy supplied into a state originate from qualified solar energy resources. Load-serving entities or organizations that supply electricity to the state must meet these requirements. RPS solar requirements in many states are set to increase in the coming decade.

=== States with SREC markets ===
There are currently 35 states (and Washington, D.C.) with existing Renewable Portfolio Standards (RPS). Of those 36, only 17 have specific solar carve-outs mandated in their RPS. And of the 17 with solar carve-outs, only 7 utilize SRECs as the incentive type.

Top 5 SREC markets
State	RPS solar carve-out
Washington DC	10% by 2041
New Jersey	5.1% by 2023
Maryland	2.5% by 2020
Illinois	1.5% by 2025
Pennsylvania	0.5% by 2021

Massachusetts' SREC market recently closed new applications to the program to transition to a different type of incentive. Ohio is no longer included in the list because the state passed legislation to eliminate their RPS altogether in 2026.

=== Prices ===
Typically, there is no assigned monetary value to an SREC. SREC prices are ultimately determined by market forces within the parameters set forth by the state. If there is a shortage in SREC supply, pricing will rise, resulting in an increase in the value of the incentive for solar systems and an intended acceleration in solar installations. As SREC supply catches up to SREC demand, pricing will likely decrease, resulting in an intended deceleration in solar installations. Over time, SREC markets are designed to find the equilibrium price that encourages enough installation to meet the growing demand set forth by the RPS. Generally speaking, SREC prices are a function of (1) a state's solar alternative compliance payment (SACP); (2) the supply and demand for SRECs within the relevant state; and (3) the term or length over which SRECs are sold.

=== Spot sales ===
Spot prices for SRECs are generally higher than prices found in long-term contracts since the system owner is taking on market risk. If increases in supply outpace the growing demand, spot prices could fall. SRECs have traded as high as $680 in New Jersey. Meanwhile, other state SREC market prices range from $45 in Delaware to $271.05 in Massachusetts. In addition to the strength of spot market demand in states experiencing supply shortages, the general lack of availability of viable long-term contracts and the heavy discounts applied to these contracts have left some system owners and project developers seeking ways to finance solar through spot transactions. In June 2010, Diamond Castle, a New York-based private equity firm, announced that it would be financing projects strictly with equity to avoid the premiums paid in long-term contracts.

=== Long-term contracts ===
In addition to providing cash flow security and stability, long-term SREC contracts are often required by banks or other lending institutions unwilling to accept market and legislative risks associated with SREC markets. However, SREC contracts longer than 3 years can be difficult to secure in some SREC markets because, in deregulated electricity markets, energy suppliers rarely have electricity supply contracts longer than three years. Some SREC aggregators have managed to negotiate 3- to 10-year agreements and can offer similar length contracts to their residential and commercial customers. In most cases, long-term contracts demand some sort of premium over market prices to compensate the off-taker for putting up the credit to guarantee the contract if prices drop. This premium is also affected by the general lack of availability of credible off-takers in the market. In some markets, however, where short-term supply has overtaken demand, long-term prices can be better than spot prices.
