= Guarantee of origin =

Energy certificate in Europe

A Guarantee of Origin (GO or GoO) is an energy certificate defined in article 19 of the European Directive 2018/2001/EC (previously in article 15 of the European Directive 2009/28/EC). A GO certifies attributes of electricity, gas (including hydrogen), heating and cooling, especially coming from renewable sources and provides information to energy customers on the source of their energy. Guarantees of Origin are the only defined instruments evidencing the origin of electricity generated from renewable energy sources.

== Certificate ==
In operation, a GO is a green label or tracker that guarantees that one MWh of energy has been produced from renewable energy sources. Guarantees of Origin are traded and when a company buys Guarantees of Origin, as proof for the electricity or gas delivered or consumed, the Guarantees of Origin are cancelled in an electronic certificate registry. This single standardized instrument makes it possible to track unique ownership, verify claims and ensure that Guarantees of Origin are only sold once.

Guarantees of Origin are issued electronically for a quantity of energy generation (1 GO per MWh), traded and redeemed (i.e. used) by suppliers as evidence for their customers of the source of the delivered electricity. Generation from renewable energy sources is the most sought-after attribute. Some countries issue Guarantees of Origin for all fuel types of electricity or gas generation (e.g. electricity from nuclear sources, low-carbon hydrogen).

Guarantees of Origin should not be confused with the Eugene Green Energy Standard or EKOenergy labelling scheme. Both provide consumers with more information about their power (transparency). However, Eugene and EKOenergy go further by requiring additionality. Eugene and EKOenergy are private initiatives whereas Guarantees of Origin arise from European regulations.

== Governance ==
The GO is standardized through the European Energy Certificate System (EECS) provided by the Association of Issuing Bodies (AIB). The European Energy Certificate System standardizes trade, cancellation and use of GOs across AIB members.

== Terminology ==
=== Production period ===
Refers to the month and year when the electricity or gas was produced. The REDII introduces the option for EU member states to issue Guarantees of Origin from smaller production periods, to hourly or quarter-hour time intervals.

=== Transfer ===
Transfer is the exchange of ownership of a GO from one party to another.

=== Import – export ===
GOs can originate in a country other than the country of consumption. GOs can be imported (exported) from another country either via import (export), or via cancellation.

=== Cancellation ===
Cancellation is the physical 'use' of a GO certificate and is the method for allocating the attributes of the electricity or gas to a single end-user. Cancelling a GO is the only way to redeem its benefits while ensuring that the certificate will not be traded, sold, or used by another end-user. Consumer information and avoidance of double counting is the main objective of this system.

== Criticism ==
Guarantees of origin have been criticized due to a variety of reasons. Most notable are the issues of double counting and the lack of additionality. Legislative and other measures have been taken to address such issues.

=== Double Counting ===
The use of electricity certification systems like guarantees of origin entails a risk of double counting of renewable energy if not embedded in adequate regulations or usage practice. Double claiming means that the same renewable electricity or gas production is claimed for multiple energy consumers.

Such double counting has been of concern in the case of Iceland, a country which produces its power nearly exclusively from renewable electricity. Iceland exports guarantees of origin for most of its electricity. At the same time, energy intensive companies within Iceland that do not receive guarantees of origin claim to produce with 100% renewable electricity.

After media reports, the Association of Issuing Bodies (AIB) has suspended certificate exports from Iceland in April 2023. AIB lifted the ban and allowed exports from Iceland again, while at the same time stating that the situation has not been resolved.

Similar issues with double counting exist in Norway and have been known for several years.

=== Lack of Additionality ===
Electricity certificate systems do not necessarily lead to the construction of new renewable energy capacity if certificates are issued for power plants that already exist or that have been subsidized by other means. Basic Guarantees of origin contain no mechanism that leads to additionality of the electricity purchased if no additional measures are included. Some scientists have criticized that such accounting is therefore problematic and should be avoided.

== See also ==
- European Energy Certificate System
- CHP Directive
- EKOenergy
- Green certificate (Europe)
