= Renewable Energy Certificate (United States) =

Tradable environmental commodity

Renewable Energy Certificates (RECs), also known as Green tags, Renewable Energy Credits, Renewable Electricity Certificates, or Tradable Renewable Certificates (TRCs), are tradable, non-tangible energy certificates in the United States that represent proof that 1 megawatt-hour (MWh) of electricity was generated from an eligible renewable energy resource (renewable electricity) and was fed into the grid. Solar renewable energy certificates (SRECs) are RECs that are specifically generated by solar energy.

== Background ==
There are two main markets for renewable energy certificates in the United States – compliance markets and voluntary markets.

Compliance markets are created by a policy that exists in 29 U.S. states, the District of Columbia, and Puerto Rico, called Renewable Portfolio Standard. In these states, the electric companies are required to supply a certain percent of their electricity from renewable generators by a specified year. For example, in California the law is 33% renewable by 2020, whereas New York has a 24% requirement by 2013. Electric utilities in these states demonstrate compliance with their requirements by purchasing RECs; in the California example, the electric companies would need to hold RECs equivalent to 33% of their electricity sales.

Voluntary markets are ones in which customers choose to buy renewable power out of a desire to use renewable energy. Most corporate and household purchases of renewable energy are voluntary purchases. Renewable energy generators located in states that do not have a Renewable Portfolio Standard can sell their RECs to voluntary buyers, usually at a cheaper price than compliance market RECs.

== Marketers ==
RECs can be traded directly from buyer to seller, but third party marketers, brokers, or asset managers are commonly found in the marketplace. Renewable generation facilities will often sell their credits to these entities, who then resell them on the market at a later date.

Texas developed the first comprehensive RECs system in the U.S., a web-based platform that provides for the issuance, registration, trade, and retirement of RECs. The Texas REC Program, which only tracks renewable energy certificates, started operating in July 2001.

In the Western United States, RECs are traded on the Western Renewable Energy Generation Information System (WREGIS) as part of the Western Electricity Coordinating Council (WECC). The WECC encompasses 14 states, 2 Canadian provinces, and northern Baja Mexico.

== Prices ==
Prices depend on many factors, such as the vintage year the RECs were generated, location of the facility, whether there is a tight supply/demand situation, whether the REC is used for RPS compliance, even the type of power created. Solar renewable energy certificates or SRECs, for example, tend to be more valuable in the 16 states that have set aside a portion of the RPS specifically for solar energy. This differentiation is intended to promote diversity in the renewable energy mix which in an undifferentiated, competitive REC market, favors the economics and scale achieved by wind farms.

In the United States, spot prices for SRECs generally decreased from 2010 to 2014. In New Jersey, the spot price for a 2010 SREC was $665.04 in July 2010 and about $160 in May 2014 for SRECs generated in different years. In Delaware, the spot price for a 2010 SREC was $255 in July 2010 and about $50 in May 2014 for SRECs generated in different years. Rates for 2015 to 2017 RECS purchased have averaged between $0.15—$0.045 per kWh produced. In 2021, SREC prices range from $10 to over $400 depending on the state SREC market.

In Canada, 2008–09 BCHydro offers $3 /MWh for "green attributes", for long-term contracts, 20 plus years. Many Independent Power Producers (IPPs) believe that this is much less than "fair market value", but have no alternative.

While the value of RECs fluctuate, most sellers are legally obligated to "deliver" RECs to their customers within a few months of their generation date. Other organizations will sell as many RECs as possible and then use the funds to guarantee a specific fixed price per MWh generated by a future wind farm, for example, making the building of the wind farm a financially viable prospect. The income provided by RECs, and a long-term stabilized market for tags can generate the additional incentive needed to build renewable energy plants.

== Certification ==
RECs are known under functionally equivalent names, such as Green Tags or Tradable Renewable Certificates (TRCs), depending on the market. The U.S. currently does not have a national registry of RECs issued. Though the Center for Resource Solutions and other groups claim to offer programs to prevent double counting, allowing two entities to take environmental credit for the same electricity is, in effect, the same. Under the Green-e Energy program, participants are required to submit to an annual Verification Process Audit of all eligible transactions to ensure the RECs meet the requirements for certification. The certification process requires 3rd party verification to be performed by an independent certified public accountant or a certified internal auditor. CRS maintains a list of auditors who meet the criteria to be listed on the program website. Increasingly RECs are being assigned unique ID numbers and tracked through regional tracking systems/registries such as WREGIS, NEPOOL, GATS, ERCOT, NYGATS, NAR, MIRECS, NC-RETS, NVTREC and M-RETS.

== Qualifying technologies ==
The following generation technologies qualify as producers of RECs:

- Solar electric
- Wind
- Geothermal
- Low Impact Hydropower (small-run-of-the-river facilities, not ones that require large dams and reservoirs, or affecting river flows adversely.)
- Biomass, biofuels and landfill to gas
- Fuel cells (only if powered by hydrogen produced by one of the above approved generators, not from fossil fuels).
- In some states, combined heat and power systems

== Additionality ==
"Additionality" in the context of greenhouse gas (GHG) regulations means that a purchased renewable energy certificate introduces new renewable energy onto the electricity grid beyond what would have happened without the project or "business as usual". The U.S. Environmental Protection Agency (EPA) favors performance-based measures of additionality, such as the megawatt-hour (MWh) equivalent per REC.

Critics argue "additionality" amounts to a subsidy for renewable energy, that business as usual (supply and demand) prevents unnecessary/duplicative renewable energy from being sold in some markets where overgeneration (excess supply in relation to demand) threatens grid reliability.

Whereas air and water pollution travels across state and national boundaries irrespective of its origin, the value of RECs and the emergence of RECs markets depend very much on the markets created state by state through legislative action to mandate a Renewable Portfolio Standard. Such a balkanized approach to establishing RECs markets and incentives state by state creates issues of equity as some states could legitimately claim that their neighboring states (and their electricity consumers) with voluntary RPS are operating as free riders of pollution prevention, paid for by states (and their electricity consumers) with mandatory RPS. We can learn from EPA's SOx and NOx cap and trade program regarding how the principle of additionality with a national standard provided a benchmark for measuring and validating the commodification of pollution prevention credits that lead to market-driven initiatives with proven results in improving regional and national air quality.

In states with a Renewable Portfolio Standard, a RECs purchase enables the utility company to meet its minimum renewable electricity percentage without having to install that renewable generating capacity itself, regardless of the source of generating renewable energy. By analogy, in the EPA cap and trade program, a "clean" utility in one state can sell its NOx credits to a "dirty" utility in another state that would otherwise have to install additional smokestack scrubbers.

The United States Environmental Protection Agency claims to have the highest percentage use of green power of any federal agency. In 2007, it offset the electricity use of 100% of its offices. The Air Force is the largest purchaser in the US government in absolute terms, purchasing 899,142 MWh worth of RECs. Among colleges and universities, the University of Pennsylvania in Philadelphia is the largest purchaser of RECs, buying 192,727 MWh of RECs from wind power. The corporate leader is Intel, with 1,302,040 MWh purchased in 2007, and the largest purchaser among retailers is Whole Foods, which purchased 509,104 MWH, or enough RECs to offset 100% of its electricity needs.

Research based on sample sets between 2004 and 2011 shows that Solar RECs purchased and retired voluntarily in the United States (i.e., not for compliance with a Renewable Portfolio Standard) do not lead to any significant additional renewable energy investment or generation. However, these findings may not be applicable given the changes in the REC market, such as supply, demand, efficiencies, and pricing dynamics.

== Criticism ==
Critics have attacked renewable energy certificates/credits for allowing renewables producers to double-count the clean energy contribution of the energy they represent. By separating clean energy "attributes" from the energy itself, then selling them in the form of certificates to fossil fuel producers, they allow two entities to take clean-energy credit for the same electricity. Corresponding electricity from the fossil fuel producer is recorded as sourceless "null" energy, effectively scrubbing greenhouse gases emitted during its production from the record.

Though both sources are properly credited financially, double-counting permits states to report emissions as being up to 50% lower than they actually are, making claims of progress in meeting climate goals dubious. For renewables producers, selling the certificates may be in violation of federal law. Severin Borenstein, director of the Energy Institute at UC Berkeley's Haas School of Business, writes, "If the certificates are stripped off...separately from the electricity, the FTC [Federal Trade Commission] says...it is deceptive for the TPO [third party owner] to advertise or tell solar buyers they are getting 'clean', 'renewable', or maybe even 'solar' electricity with their lease or power purchase agreement."

== See also ==
- Carbon offset
- Climate change in Sweden#Policy - Renewable energy certificate system
- Energy accounting
- Energy development
- Energy economics
- Energy Efficiency Credit
- Green certificate (Europe)
- Green energy
- Green tax shift
- Guarantee of origin
- Renewable Energy Certificates Registry – Australia
- Renewable Energy Certificate System – Europe
- Renewable energy development
- Renewable Energy Payments
- Renewables
- Renewables Obligation (UK)
- Solar-charged vehicle
- Solar Renewable Energy Certificates
