= Environmental impact of electricity generation =

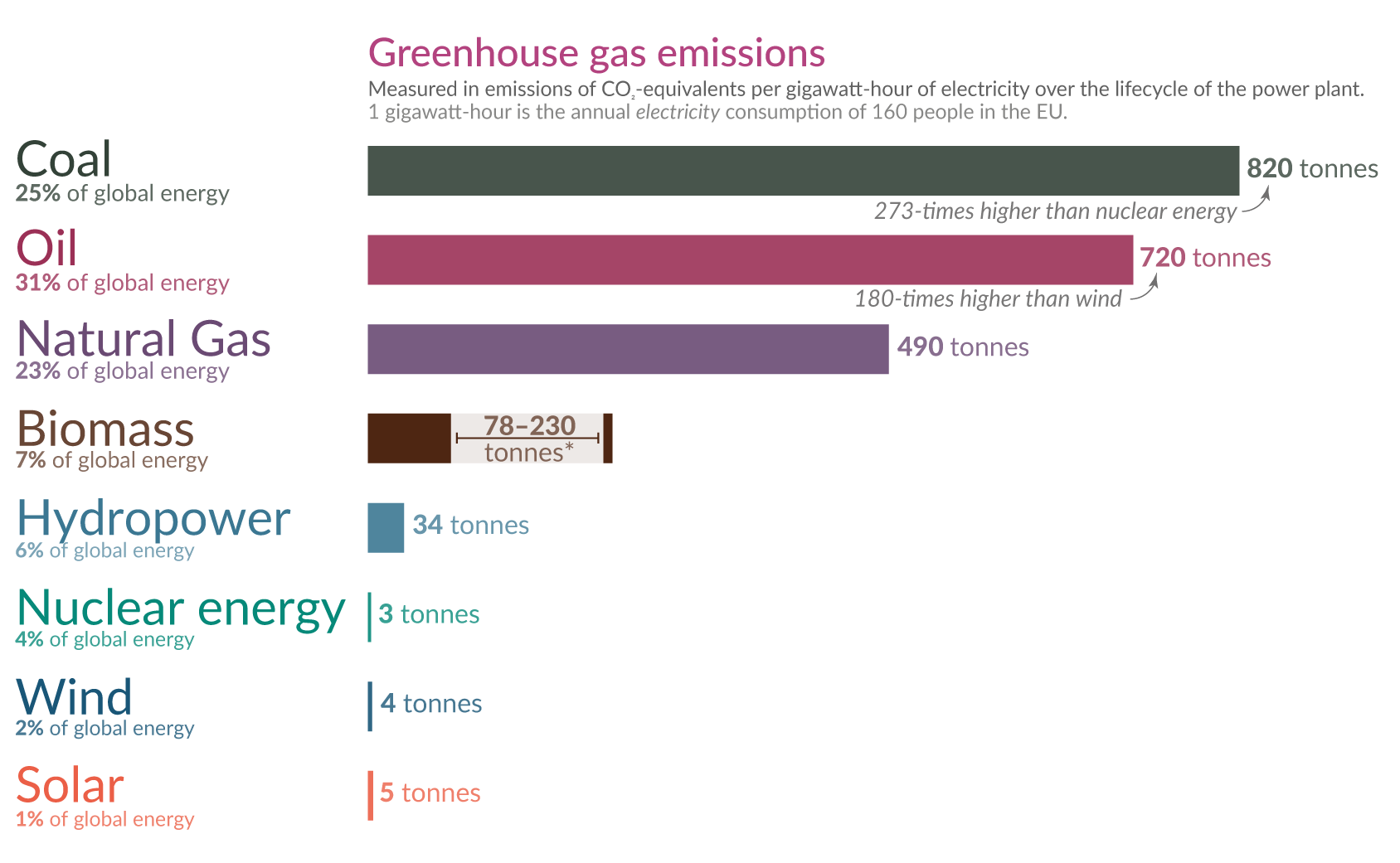
Greenhouse gas emissions per energy source.

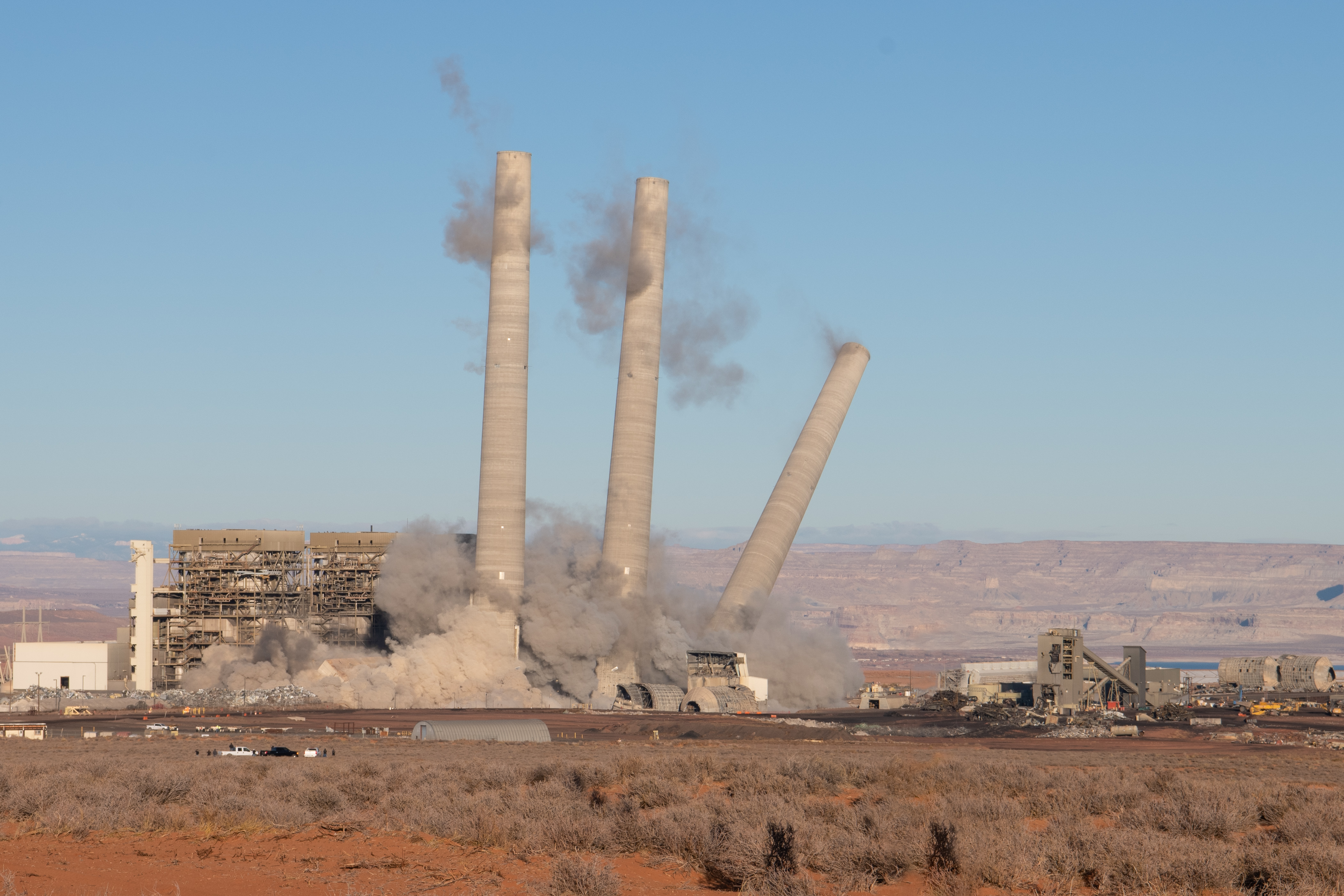
Coal power is being phased out because of its pollution - such as Navajo Generating Station

Electric power systems consist of generation plants of different energy sources, transmission networks, and distribution lines. Each of these components can have environmental impacts at multiple stages of their development and use including in their construction, during the generation of electricity, and in their decommissioning and disposal. These impacts can be split into operational impacts (fuel sourcing, global atmospheric and localized pollution) and construction impacts (manufacturing, installation, decommissioning, and disposal). All forms of electricity generation have some form of environmental impact, but coal-fired power is the dirtiest. This page is organized by energy source and includes impacts such as water usage, emissions, local pollution, and wildlife displacement.

== Greenhouse gas emissions ==
Greenhouse gas emissions are one of the environmental impacts of electricity generation. Measurement of life-cycle greenhouse gas emissions involves calculating the global warming potential (GWP) of energy sources through life-cycle assessment. These are usually sources of only electrical energy but sometimes sources of heat are evaluated. The findings are presented in units of global warming potential per unit of electrical energy generated by that source. The scale uses the global warming potential unit, the carbon dioxide equivalent (CO_{2}e), and the unit of electrical energy, the kilowatt hour (kWh). The goal of such assessments is to cover the full life of the source, from material and fuel mining through construction to operation and waste management.

In 2014, the Intergovernmental Panel on Climate Change harmonized the carbon dioxide equivalent (CO_{2}e) findings of the major electricity generating sources in use worldwide. This was done by analyzing the findings of hundreds of individual scientific papers assessing each energy source. Coal is by far the worst emitter, followed by natural gas, with solar, wind and nuclear all low-carbon. Hydropower, biomass, geothermal and ocean power may generally be low-carbon, but poor design or other factors could result in higher emissions from individual power stations.

For all technologies, advances in efficiency, and therefore reductions in CO_{2}e since the time of publication, have not been included. For example, the total life cycle emissions from wind power may have lessened since publication. Similarly, due to the time frame over which the studies were conducted, nuclear Generation II reactor's CO_{2}e results are presented and not the global warming potential of Generation III reactors. Other limitations of the data include: a) missing life cycle phases, and, b) uncertainty as to where to define the cut-off point in the global warming potential of an energy source. The latter is important in assessing a combined electrical grid in the real world, rather than the established practice of simply assessing the energy source in isolation.

== Water usage ==
Water usage is one of the main environmental impacts of electricity generation. All thermal power plants (coal, natural gas, nuclear, geothermal, and biomass) use water as a cooling fluid to drive the thermodynamic cycles that allow electricity to be extracted from heat energy. Solar uses water for cleaning equipment, while hydroelectricity has water usage from evaporation from the reservoirs. The amount of water usage is often of great concern for electricity generating systems as populations increase and droughts become a concern. In addition, changes in water resources may impact the reliability of electricity generation.

Discussions of water usage of electricity generation distinguish between water withdrawal and water consumption. According to the United States Geological Survey, "withdrawal" is defined as the amount of water removed from the ground or diverted from a water source for use, while "consumption" refers to the amount of water that is evaporated, transpired, incorporated into products or crops, or otherwise removed from the immediate water environment. Both water withdrawal and consumption are important environmental impacts to evaluate.

General numbers for fresh water usage of different power sources are shown below.

	Water Consumption (gal/MW-h)		
Power source	Low case	Medium/average case	High case
Nuclear power	100 (once-through cooling)	270 once-through, 650 (tower and pond)	845 (cooling tower)
Coal	58	500	1,100 (cooling tower, generic combustion)
Natural gas	100 (once-through cycle)	800 (steam-cycle, cooling towers)	1,170 (steam-cycle with cooling towers)
Hydroelectricity	1,430	4,491	18,000
Solar thermal	53 (dry cooling)	800	1,060 (Trough)
Geothermal	1,800		4,000
Biomass	300		480
Solar photovoltaic	0	26	33
Wind power	0	0	1

Steam-cycle plants (nuclear, coal, NG, solar thermal) require a great deal of water for cooling, to remove the heat at the steam condensers. The amount of water needed relative to plant output will be reduced with increasing boiler temperatures. Coal- and gas-fired boilers can produce high steam temperatures and so are more efficient, and require less cooling water relative to output. Nuclear boilers are limited in steam temperature by material constraints, and solar thermal is limited by concentration of the energy source.

Thermal cycle plants near the ocean have the option of using seawater. Such a site will not have cooling towers and will be much less limited by environmental concerns of the discharge temperature since dumping heat will have very little effect on water temperatures. This will also not deplete the water available for other uses. Nuclear power in Japan for instance, uses no cooling towers at all because all plants are located on the coast. If dry cooling systems are used, significant water from the water table will not be used. Other, more novel, cooling solutions exist, such as sewage cooling at the Palo Verde Nuclear Generating Station.

Hydroelectricity's main cause of water usage is both evaporation and seepage into the water table.

While water usage is still a major necessity for the production of electricity, since 2015 the use of water has decreased. In 2015 the total water withdrawals from thermoelectric power plants was just over 60 trillion gallons, but in 2020 it decreased to just under 50 trillion gallons. The water use has gone down because of the increase in the use of renewable energy sources.

80% of the decrease in water use is due to the use of natural gas and the use of renewables instead of just producing energy through coal-fired plants. And the other 20% of the decrease in water use comes from the implementation of closed loop recirculating and hybrid cooling systems rather than once through cooling systems. Once through cooling systems has an excessive amount of water withdrawals, so the water is only used once then released. While the closed loop water is reused several times so the water withdrawals is much lower.

== Fossil fuels ==
Most electricity today is generated by burning fossil fuels and producing steam which is then used to drive a steam turbine that, in turn, drives an electrical generator.

More serious are concerns about the emissions that result from fossil fuel burning. Fossil fuels constitute a significant repository of carbon buried deep underground. Burning them results in the conversion of this carbon to carbon dioxide, which is then released into the atmosphere. The estimated CO_{2} emission from the world's electrical power industry is 10 billion tonnes yearly. This results in an increase in the Earth's levels of atmospheric carbon dioxide, which enhances the greenhouse effect and contributes to global warming.

=== Coal power ===
Depending on the particular fossil fuel and the method of burning, other emissions may be produced as well. Ozone, sulfur dioxide, NO_{2} and other gases are often released, as well as particulate matter. Sulfur and nitrogen oxides contribute to smog and acid rain. In the past, plant owners addressed this problem by building very tall flue-gas stacks, so that the pollutants would be diluted in the atmosphere. While this helps reduce local contamination, it does not help at all with global issues.

Fossil fuels, particularly coal, also contain dilute radioactive material, and burning them in very large quantities releases this material into the environment, leading to low levels of local and global radioactive contamination, the levels of which are, ironically, higher than a nuclear power station as their radioactive contaminants are controlled and stored.

Coal also contains traces of toxic heavy elements such as mercury, arsenic and others. Mercury vaporized in a power plant's boiler may stay suspended in the atmosphere and circulate around the world. While a substantial inventory of mercury exists in the environment, as other man-made emissions of mercury become better controlled, power plant emissions become a significant fraction of the remaining emissions. Power plant emissions of mercury in the United States are thought to be about 50 tons per year in 2003, and several hundred tons per year in China. Power plant designers can fit equipment to power stations to reduce emissions.

Coal mining practices in the United States have also included strip mining and removing mountain tops. Mill tailings are left out bare and have been leached into local rivers and resulted in most or all of the rivers in coal producing areas to run red year round with sulfuric acid that kills all life in the rivers.

=== Fossil gas power ===
In 2022 the IEA said that greenhouse gas emissions from gas-fired power plants had increased by nearly 3% the previous year and that more efforts were needed to reduce them.

As well as greenhouse gases, these power plants emit nitrogen oxides (NOx) but this is less dangerous than NOx from gas appliances in houses.

The efficiency of gas-fired power plants can be improved by co-generation and geothermal (combined heat and power) methods. Process steam can be extracted from steam turbines. Waste heat produced by thermal generating stations can be used for space heating of nearby buildings. By combining electric power production and heating, less fuel is consumed, thereby reducing the environmental effects compared with separate heat and power systems.

=== Fuel oil and diesel ===
Dirty oil is burnt in power plants in a few oil producing countries such as Iran. Diesel is often used in backup generators, which can cause air pollution.

== Switching from fuels to electricity ==
Clean energy is mostly generated in the form of electricity, such as renewable energy or nuclear power. Switching to these energy sources requires that end uses, such as transport and heating, be electrified for the world's energy systems to be sustainable. In the U.S. and Canada the use of heat pumps (HP) can be economic if powered with solar photovoltaic (PV) devices to offset propane heating in rural areas and natural gas heating in cities. A 2023 study investigated: (1) a residential natural gas-based heating system and grid electricity, (2) a residential natural gas-based heating system with PV to serve the electric load, (3) a residential HP system with grid electricity, and (4) a residential HP+PV system. It found that under typical inflation conditions, the lifecycle cost of natural gas and reversible, air-source heat pumps are nearly identical, which in part explains why heat pump sales have surpassed gas furnace sales in the U.S. for the first time during a period of high inflation.

With higher rates of inflation or lower PV capital costs, PV becomes a hedge against rising prices and encourages the adoption of heat pumps by also locking in both electricity and heating cost growth. The study concludes: "The real internal rate of return for such prosumer technologies is 20x greater than a long-term certificate of deposit, which demonstrates the additional value PV and HP technologies offer prosumers over comparably secure investment vehicles while making substantive reductions in carbon emissions." This approach can be improved by integrating a thermal battery into the heat pump+solar energy heating system.

== Nuclear power ==
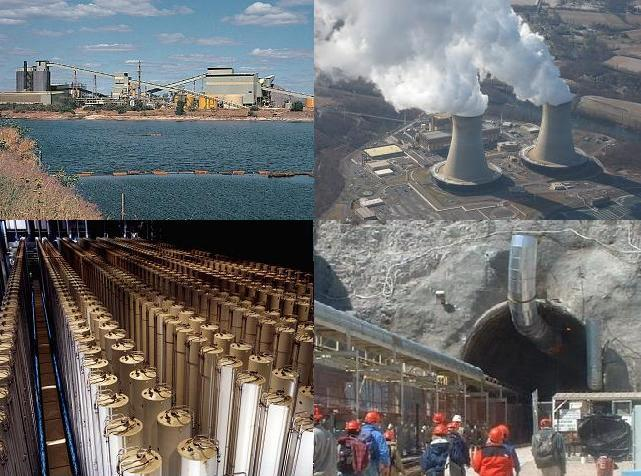
Nuclear power activities involving the environment; mining, enrichment, generation and geological disposal.

Nuclear power has various environmental impacts, both positive and negative, including the construction and operation of the plant, the nuclear fuel cycle, and the effects of nuclear accidents. Nuclear power plants do not burn fossil fuels and so do not directly emit carbon dioxide. The carbon dioxide emitted during mining, enrichment, fabrication and transport of fuel is small when compared with the carbon dioxide emitted by fossil fuels of similar energy yield, however, these plants still produce other environmentally damaging wastes. Nuclear energy and renewable energy have reduced environmental costs by decreasing CO_{2} emissions resulting from energy consumption.

There is a catastrophic risk potential if containment fails, which in nuclear reactors can be brought about by overheated fuels melting and releasing large quantities of fission products into the environment. In normal operation, nuclear power plants release less radioactive material than coal power plants whose fly ash contains significant amounts of thorium, uranium and their daughter nuclides.

A large nuclear power plant may reject waste heat to a natural body of water; this can result in undesirable increase of the water temperature with adverse effect on aquatic life. Alternatives include cooling towers.

Mining of uranium ore can disrupt the environment around the mine. However, with modern in-situ leaching technology this impact can be reduced compared to "classical" underground or open-pit mining. Disposal of spent nuclear fuel is controversial, with many proposed long-term storage schemes under intense review and criticism. Diversion of fresh- or low-burnup spent fuel to weapons production presents a risk of nuclear proliferation, however all nuclear weapons states derived the material for their first nuclear weapon from (non-power) research reactors or dedicated "production reactors" and/or uranium enrichment. Finally, some parts the structure of the reactor itself becomes radioactive through neutron activation and will require decades of storage before it can be economically dismantled and in turn disposed of as waste. Measures like reducing the cobalt content in steel to decrease the amount of cobalt-60 produced by neutron capture can reduce the amount of radioactive material produced and the radiotoxicity that originates from this material. However, part of the issue is not radiological but regulatory as most countries assume any given object that originates from the "hot" (radioactive) area of a nuclear power plant or a facility in the nuclear fuel cycle is ipso facto radioactive, even if no contamination or neutron irradiation induced radioactivity is detectable.

== Renewable energy ==
Renewable power technologies can have significant environmental benefits. Unlike coal and natural gas, they can generate electricity and fuels without releasing significant quantities of CO_{2} and other greenhouse gases that contribute to climate change, however the greenhouse gas savings from a number of biofuels have been found to be much less than originally anticipated, as discussed in the article Indirect land use change impacts of biofuels.

Both solar and wind have been criticized from an aesthetic point of view. However, methods and opportunities exist to deploy these renewable technologies efficiently and unobtrusively: fixed solar collectors can double as noise barriers along highways, and extensive roadway, parking lot, and roof-top area is currently available; amorphous photovoltaic cells can also be used to tint windows and produce energy.

=== Hydroelectricity ===
The major advantage of conventional hydroelectric dams with reservoirs is their ability to store potential power for later electrical production. The combination of a natural supply of energy and production on demand has made hydro power the largest source of renewable energy by far. Other advantages include longer life than fuel-fired generation, low operating costs, and the provision of facilities for water sports. Some dams also operate as pumped-storage plants balancing supply and demand in the generation system. Overall, hydroelectric power can be less expensive than electricity generated from fossil fuels or nuclear energy, and areas with abundant hydroelectric power attract industry.

However, in addition to the advantages above, there are several disadvantages to dams that create large reservoirs. These may include: dislocation of people living where the reservoirs are planned, release of significant amounts of carbon dioxide at construction and flooding of the reservoir, disruption of aquatic ecosystems and bird life, adverse impacts on the river environment, and in rare cases catastrophic failure of the dam wall.

Some other disadvantages of the construction of hydroelectric dams is having to build access roads to get to the dam which disrupt the land ecosystem and not just the water ecosystems. Also with the increase in carbon dioxide, there is an increase in methane. This is from the flooding during the creation of the dams, when plants are submerged underwater and decay, they release methane gas. Another disadvantage is the upfront cost to build the dam and the amount of time it takes to build it.

Some dams only generate power and serve no other purpose, but in many places large reservoirs are needed for flood control and/or irrigation, adding a hydroelectric portion is a common way to pay for a new reservoir. Flood control protects life/property and irrigation supports increased agriculture.

Small hydro and run-of-the-river are two low impact alternatives to hydroelectric reservoirs, although they may produce intermittent power due to a lack of stored water.

==== Tidal ====
Tidal power can affect marine life. The turbines' rotating blades can accidentally kill swimming sea life. Projects such as the one in Strangford include a safety mechanism that turns off the turbine when marine animals approach. However, this feature causes a major loss in energy because of the amount of marine life that passes through the turbines. Some fish may avoid the area if threatened by a constantly rotating or noisy object. Marine life is a huge factor when siting tidal power energy generators, and precautions are taken to ensure that as few marine animals as possible are affected by it. In terms of global warming potential (i.e. carbon footprint), the impact of tidal power generation technologies ranges between 15 and 37 gCO_{2}-eq/kWhe, with a median value of 23.8 gCO_{2}-eq/kWhe. This is in line with the impact of other renewables like wind and solar power, and significantly better than fossil-based technologies. The Tethys database provides access to scientific literature and general information on the potential environmental effects of tidal energy.

=== Biomass ===
Electrical power can be generated by burning anything which will combust. Some electrical power is generated by burning crops which are grown specifically for the purpose. Usually this is done by fermenting plant matter to produce ethanol, which is then burned. This may also be done by allowing organic matter to decay, producing biogas, which is then burned. Also, when burned, wood is a form of biomass fuel.

Burning biomass produces many of the same emissions as burning fossil fuels. However, growing biomass captures carbon dioxide out of the air, so that the net contribution to global atmospheric carbon dioxide levels is small.

The process of growing biomass is subject to the same environmental concerns as any kind of agriculture. It uses a large amount of land, and fertilizers and pesticides may be necessary for cost-effective growth. Biomass that is produced as a by-product of agriculture shows some promise, but most such biomass is currently being used, for plowing back into the soil as fertilizer if nothing else.

=== Wind power ===
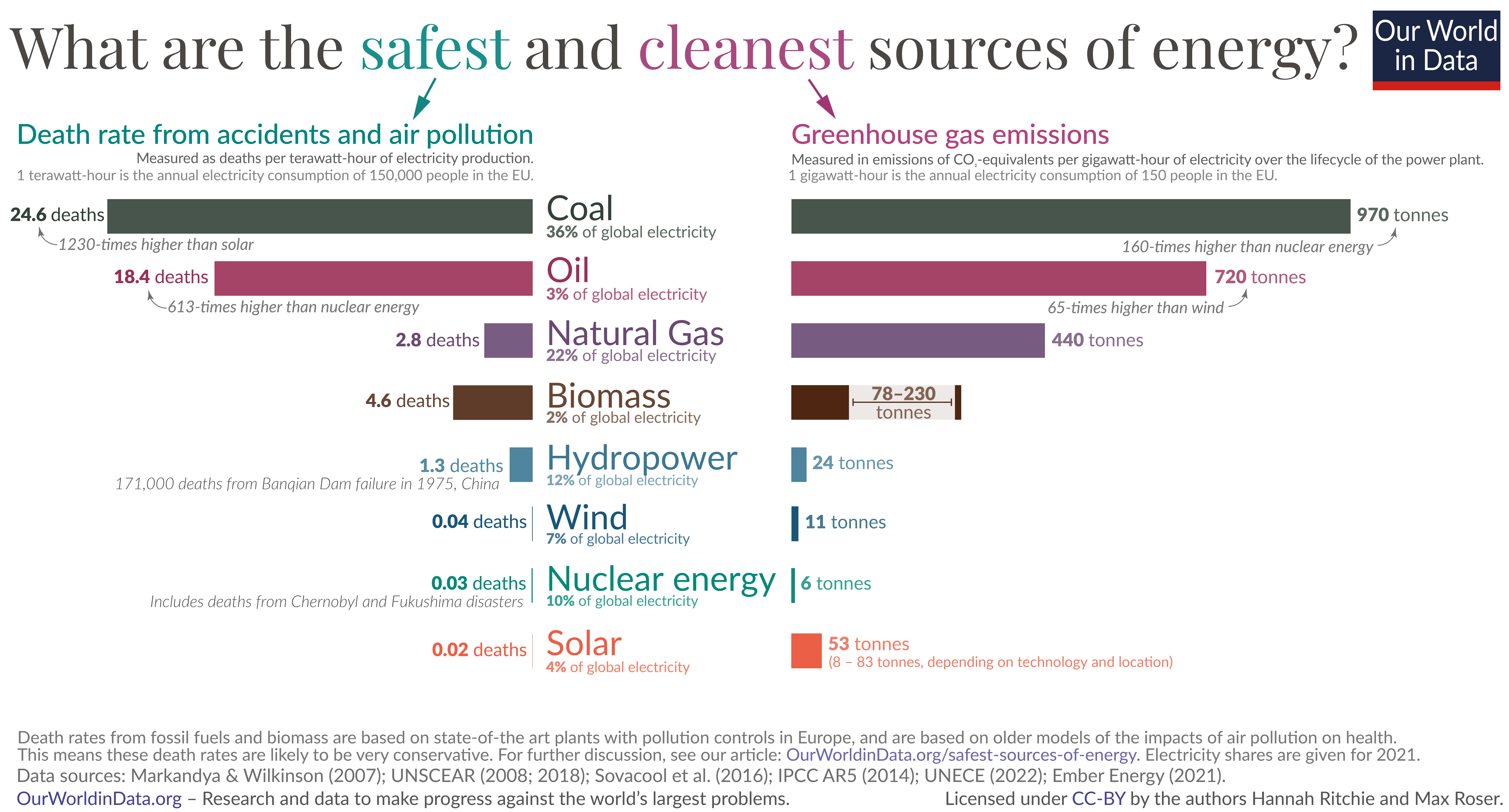
Per unit of energy, nuclear and wind power have minimal greenhouse emissions, and together with solar are the least deadly sources of energy.

The environmental impact of electricity generation from wind power is minor when compared to that of fossil fuel power. Wind power consumes no fuel, and emits no air pollution, unlike fossil fuels. Wind turbines have some of the lowest global warming potential per unit of electricity generated: far less greenhouse gas is emitted than for the average unit of electricity, so wind power helps limit climate change. Emissions from production of a turbine are recouped in less than a year of operation, as it replaces gas or coal power.

Onshore (on-land) wind farms can have a significant visual impact and impact on the landscape. Due to a very low surface power density and spacing requirements, wind farms typically need to be spread over more land than other power stations. Conflicts arise especially in scenic and culturally-important landscapes. Siting restrictions, such as setbacks, may be implemented to limit the impact. The land between the turbines and access roads can still be used for farming and grazing. Some wind farms are opposed for potentially spoiling protected scenic areas, archaeological landscapes and heritage sites.

Many wind turbine blades are made of fiberglass and some only had a lifetime of 10 to 20 years. Previously, there was no market for recycling these old blades, and they were commonly disposed of in landfills. Because blades are hollow, they take up a large volume compared to their mass. Since 2019, some landfill operators have begun requiring blades to be crushed before being landfilled. Blade end-of-life is complicated, and blades manufactured in the 2020s are more likely to be designed to be completely recyclable.

Wind turbines also generate noise. At a distance of 300 metres (980 ft) this may be around 45 dB, which is slightly louder than a refrigerator. At 1.5 km (1 mi) distance they become inaudible. Some people who live very close to wind turbines have reported negative health effects, but peer-reviewed research has generally not supported these claims. Pile-driving to construct non-floating wind farms is noisy underwater, but in operation offshore wind is much quieter than ships.

Habitat loss and fragmentation are the greatest potential impacts on wildlife of onshore wind farms, but the worldwide ecological impact is minimal. Thousands of birds and bats, including rare species, have been killed by wind turbine blades, though wind turbines are responsible for far fewer bird deaths than fossil-fueled power stations when climate change effects are included. The effects of wind turbines on birds can be mitigated with proper wildlife monitoring.

=== Geothermal power ===
Geothermal energy is the heat of the Earth, which can be tapped into to produce electricity in power plants. Warm water produced from geothermal sources can be used for industry, agriculture, bathing and cleansing. Where underground steam sources can be tapped, the steam is used to run a steam turbine. Geothermal steam sources have a finite life as underground water is depleted. Arrangements that circulate surface water through rock formations to produce hot water or steam are, on a human-relevant time scale, renewable.

While a geothermal power plant does not burn any fuel, it will still have emissions due to substances other than steam which come up from the geothermal wells. These may include hydrogen sulfide, and carbon dioxide. Some geothermal steam sources entrain non-soluble minerals that must be removed from the steam before it is used for generation; this material must be properly disposed. Any (closed cycle) steam power plant requires cooling water for condensers; diversion of cooling water from natural sources, and its increased temperature when returned to streams or lakes, may have a significant impact on local ecosystems.

Removal of ground water and accelerated cooling of rock formations can cause earth tremors. Enhanced geothermal systems (EGS) fracture underground rock to produce more steam; such projects can cause earthquakes. Certain geothermal projects (such as one near Basel, Switzerland in 2006) have been suspended or canceled owing to objectionable seismicity induced by geothermal recovery. However, risks associated with "hydrofracturing induced seismicity are low compared to that of natural earthquakes, and can be reduced by careful management and monitoring" and "should not be regarded as an impediment to further development of the Hot Rock geothermal energy resource".

=== Solar power ===
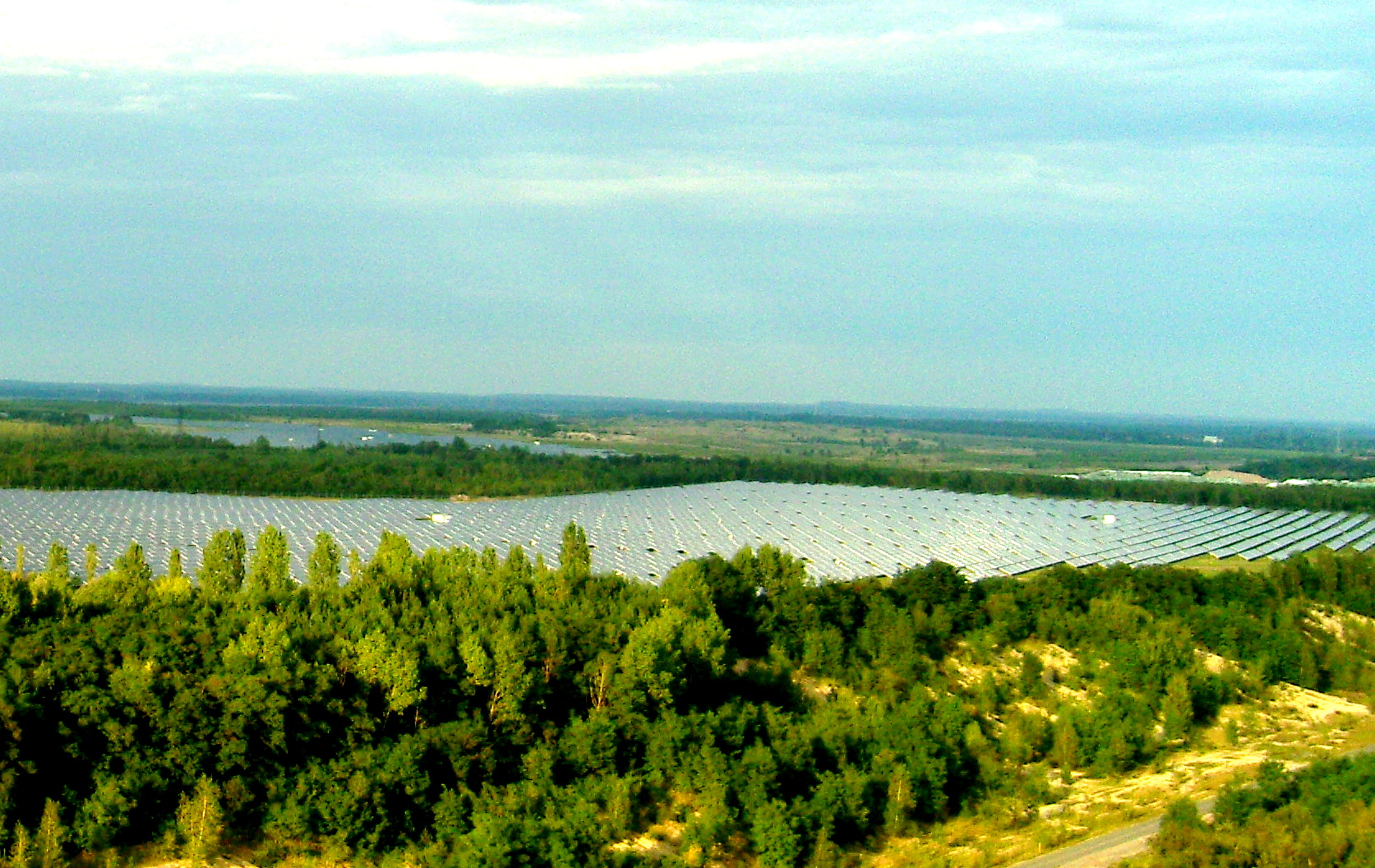
Part of the Senftenberg Solarpark, a solar photovoltaic power plant located on former open-pit mining areas close to the city of Senftenberg, in Eastern Germany. The 78 MW Phase 1 of the plant was completed within three months.

Solar power is cleaner than electricity from fossil fuels, and is better for the environment than burning things. Solar power does not lead to harmful emissions during operation, but the production of the panels creates some pollution. The carbon footprint of manufacturing is less than 1kg CO_{2}/Wp, and this is expected to fall as manufacturers use more clean electricity and recycled materials. Solar power carries an upfront cost to the environment via production with a carbon payback time of several years as of 2022, but offers clean energy for the remainder of their 30-year lifetime.

The life-cycle greenhouse-gas emissions of solar farms are less than 50 gram (g) per kilowatt-hour (kWh), but with battery storage could be up to 150 g/kWh. In contrast, a combined cycle gas-fired power plant without carbon capture and storage emits around 500 g/kWh, and a coal-fired power plant about 1000 g/kWh. Similar to all energy sources where their total life cycle emissions are mostly from construction, the switch to low carbon power in the manufacturing and transportation of solar devices would further reduce carbon emissions.

Lifecycle surface power density of solar power varies but averages about 7 W/m2, compared to about 240 for nuclear power and 480 for gas. However, when the land required for gas extraction and processing is accounted for, gas power is estimated to have not much higher power density than solar. According to a 2021 study, obtaining 25% to 80% of electricity from solar farms in their own territory by 2050 would require the panels to cover land ranging from 0.5% to 2.8% of the European Union, 0.3% to 1.4% in India, and 1.2% to 5.2% in Japan and South Korea. Occupation of such large areas for PV farms could drive residential opposition as well as lead to deforestation, removal of vegetation and conversion of farm land. However some countries, such as South Korea and Japan, use land for agriculture under PV, or floating solar, together with other low-carbon power sources. Worldwide land use has minimal ecological impact. The expansion of utility-scale solar energy development in agricultural landscapes presents an opportunity for the dual use of the land for energy production and biodiversity conservation through the establishment of grasses and forbs planted among and between the photovoltaic solar arrays ('solar-pollinator habitat'). Land use can be reduced to the level of gas power by installing on buildings and other built up areas.

Harmful materials are used in the production of solar panels, but generally in small amounts. As of 2022, the environmental impact of perovskite is difficult to estimate, but there is some concern that lead may be a problem.

A 2021 International Energy Agency study projects the demand for copper will double by 2040. The study cautions that supply needs to increase rapidly to match demand from large-scale deployment of solar and required grid upgrades. More tellurium and indium may also be needed.

Recycling may help. As solar panels are sometimes replaced with more efficient panels, the second-hand panels are sometimes reused in developing countries, for example in Africa. Several countries have specific regulations for the recycling of solar panels. Although maintenance cost is already low compared to other energy sources, some academics have called for solar power systems to be designed to be more repairable.

Solar panels can increase local temperature. In large installation in the desert, the effect can be stronger than the urban heat island.

A very small proportion of solar power is concentrated solar power. Concentrated solar power may use much more water than gas-fired power. This can be a problem, as this type of solar power needs strong sunlight so is often built in deserts.

== See also ==
- Air pollution
- Alta controversy
- The Carbon Principles
- Cost of electricity by source – includes environmental and health costs
- EKOenergy – ecolabel for electricity managed by environmental NGOs
- Environmental impact of the energy industry
- Eugene Green Energy Standard
- Flue-gas desulfurization
- Flue-gas emissions from fossil-fuel combustion
- Fossil-fuel power plant
- Life-cycle greenhouse-gas emissions of energy sources
- List of countries by electricity production from renewable source
- List of energy storage projects
- Nuclear power
- Nuclear whistleblowers
- Power stations
- Scientific opinion on climate change
