= Non-Fossil Fuel Obligation =

Electric power strategy in England and Wales

The Non-Fossil Fuel Obligation (NFFO) refers to a collection of orders requiring the electricity distribution network operators in England and Wales to purchase electricity from the nuclear power and renewable energy sectors. Similar mechanisms operated in Scotland (the Scottish Renewable Orders under the Scottish Renewables Obligation) and Northern Ireland (the Northern Ireland Non-Fossil Fuel Obligation).

Five orders were made under the NFFO before the UK government replaced it with the Renewables Obligation. The first order or 'tranche' was on 1 October 1990 with an average price of 7.51 pence per kWh being paid to energy generators, and the fifth and last was in September 1998 at an average of 2.71 pence per kWh.

Contracts for Difference have since replaced the NFFO and Renewables Obligation as the main form of revenue support for low carbon electricity in the UK.

== Background ==
The Non-Fossil Fuel Obligation was put in place under the powers of the Electricity Act 1989, under which electricity generation in the UK was privatised.

The original intention was to provide financial support to the UK nuclear power generators, which continued to be state-owned. The proposals were enlarged in scope before the obligation was brought into operation in 1990 to include the renewable energy sector.

Contracts from the last three rounds remain in place with the generators receiving the agreed amount from the NFPA and the NFPA effectively taking ownership of the Renewables Obligation certificate (ROC) to which the generator is entitled.

== Funding ==
Funding for the NFFO was originally generated by the Fossil Fuel Levy, a levy placed on all electricity consumption in the UK. This was collected by Ofgem, which paid it to the Non-Fossil Purchasing Agency, a body created in 1990 by the public electricity suppliers to purchase on the supplier's behalf. The purchasing agency is based in Newcastle upon Tyne.

Since the introduction in 2001 of the New Electricity Trading Arrangements, electricity suppliers bid for the electricity and ROCs in competitive auctions held by the Non-Fossil Purchasing Agency, with any shortfall in price being funded by the Levy. As a result of these arrangements, the Non-Fossil Fuel Obligation has been generating a trading surplus, expected to have reached £500m by 2008. The government have been criticised for siphoning off funds from this surplus to contribute to the exchequer, instead of using it to support renewable energy in other ways.

== See also ==
- Climate Change Levy
- Energy policy of the United Kingdom
- Energy use and conservation in the United Kingdom
- Renewables Obligation
