= Diamond Castle =

American private equity firm

Diamond Castle Holdings
- Company type: Private
- Industry: Private equity
- Predecessor: DLJ Merchant Banking Partners
- Founded: 2004
- Founder: Lawrence Schloss
- Headquarters: New York, New York, U.S.
- Key people: Ari Benacerraf, Michael Ranger, Andrew Rush, David Wittels
- Products: Leveraged buyout
- Total assets: $1.9 billion
- Number of employees: 25+
- Website: www.dchold.com

Diamond Castle Holdings is a private equity firm focused on leveraged buyout and growth capital investments in middle-market companies across a range of industries including the media, healthcare, financial services, power and industrial sectors.

The firm, which is based in New York City, was founded in 2004. The firm has raised approximately $1.9 billion since inception.

== History ==
In 2004, DLJMB co-head Larry Schloss, along with four senior members of DLJ Merchant Banking Partners, led a spinout from Credit Suisse to form a new private equity firm which would come to be known as Diamond Castle Holdings.

== Funds ==
In December 2006, the firm announced it had completed fundraising for a $1.85 billion private equity fund, known as Diamond Castle Partners IV (a reference to the three DLJMB funds previously raised).

As of 2014, the firm had not sought to raise a successor fund.

== See also ==
- DLJ Merchant Banking Partners
