= Outfox Energy =

UK domestic energy supplier

- Type: Private Limited
- Industry: Energy retailing
- Founded: 2017
- Founder: Keith Bastian; Maria Bastian
- Headquarters: Leicester, England
- Members: 185k (2026)
- Website: outfox.energy

Outfox Energy, the trading name of Foxglove Energy Supply Limited, is a British energy supplier based in Leicester, United Kingdom. It was founded in 2017.

== History ==
Outfox energy was established in November 2017, under the name Outfox The Market, by Keith and Maria Bastian.

In 2019, the Advertising Standards Authority upheld a complaint against Outfox the Market, which forbade it from publishing false claims to be the cheapest supplier in the UK, or the cheapest green energy supplier in the UK.

In 2021, it came top in a Which? customer satisfaction survey, knocking Octopus Energy off the top spot as of the previous year. In July 2022, it came second in a survey by Citizens Advice.

In December 2022, Ofgem served the company with a notice of failure to comply with a confirmed provisional order within the meaning of section 25 of the Electricity Act 1989 and section 28 of the Gas Act 1986. The notice, issued because of Ofgem's concerns over the company's financial viability, forbade Foxglove from taking on any new customers, or taking any money out of the company. In June 2023, the ban on new customers was lifted; however the company was still restricted from making any non-essential payments.

In July 2023, Outfox the Market was fined £1.8 million for repeatedly failing to provide Ofgem with appropriate financial data when required.

In June 2025, Outfox the Market was re-branded as Outfox Energy.

== Operations ==
The company operates through a digital-first model, allowing customers to manage their accounts, submit meter readings, and access billing information through Outfox's website or app.

Customer support is provided through channels including email, telephone, live chat, and social media platforms.
