= Energy certificate =

Record of energy use in device production

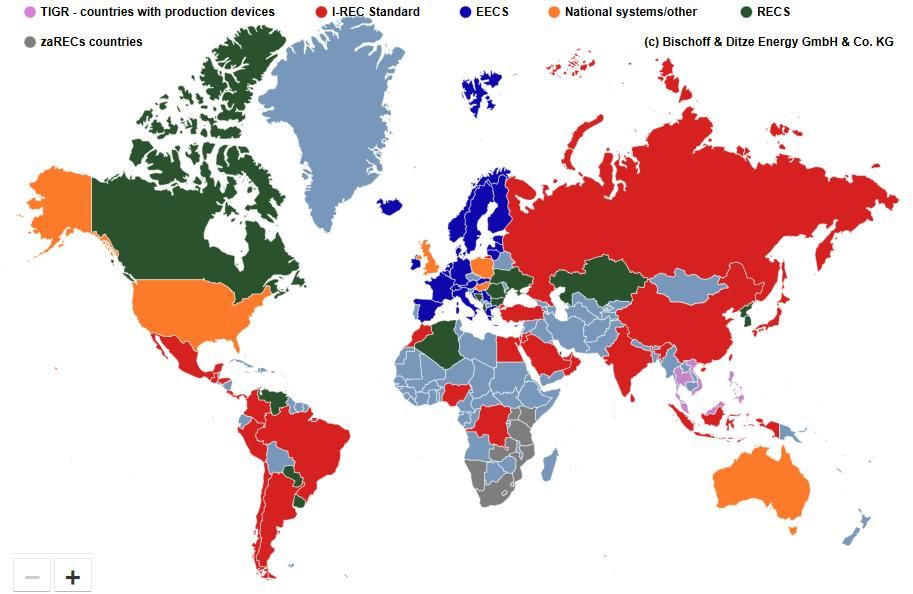
Overview of the different energy attribute certificate systems worldwide.

An energy certificate or energy attribute certificate is a transferable record or guarantee related to the amount of energy or material goods consumed by an energy conversion device in industrial production. A certificate may be in any form, including electronic, and lists attributes such as method, quality, compliance, and tracking.

== Terminology ==
An energy attribute certificate (EAC) can include "a variety of instruments with different names, including certificates, tags, credits, or generator declarations." These certificates relate to various tracking systems worldwide.

Examples of energy certificates for renewable energy are:

- Green tags
- Guarantee of origin (GO)
- International REC Standard (I-REC Standard)
- Renewable Energy Certificates (RECs)
- Renewable Energy Credits
- Tradable Instruments for Global Renewables (TIGRs)
- Tradable Renewable Certificates (TRCs)
- Tradable Renewable Energy Certificates (TRECs)

== Purpose and examples by region ==
Energy certificates issued under national legislation typically provide evidence of compliance. Electricity producers, suppliers, or consumers use these certificates when required to use a specific type of energy or to qualify for financial support. Qualifying plants often produce electricity from renewable sources or high-quality co-generators.

Some examples are:

- United Kingdom: Renewable Obligation Certificates (ROCs) issued under the Renewables Obligation
- United Kingdom: Levy Exemption Certificates (LECs) issued under the Climate Change Levy.
- Italy: Certificati Verdi
- Sweden and Belgium: Elcertifikat

Most of these support schemes are national. The Climate Change Levy is a notable exception; the regulator issues LECs to electricity producers in the United Kingdom and several European countries that export to the UK.

The European Union create internationally transferable "guarantees of origin:" It provides proof to consumers of the source of their electricity, as required by Directive 2009/72/EC. Electricity suppliers use these guarantees when calculating the proportions of energy sources (fossil fuel, nuclear, etc.) in their supplied energy. Governments use them to calculate the residual mix—the blend of electricity sources produced in a country, adjusted for imports and exports.

Directive 2009/28/EC and Directive 2012/27/EC require a guarantee of origin for renewable energy and highly-efficient co-generation. The European Union uses these certificates, as do countries bound by treaties such as the European Economic Area and the Energy Community. The Association of Issuing Bodies uses the European Energy Certificate System to facilitate issuing, using, and transferring of these certificates.

Other countries that use energy certificates include Australia, Japan, Turkey, and the United States of America.

== Overview of energy certificate systems ==
The following table provides an overview of energy certificate systems by countries. This table is incomplete; you can help by expanding it.

Country of Consumption	EECS AIB	I-RECS countries issuing allowed	I-RECS production devices listed	NECS ex-domain	TIGR production device listed	National based
Albania				NECS ex-domain		
Algeria				NECS ex-domain		
Argentina		I-RECS redemption		NECS ex-domain		
Australia		I-RECS redemption		NECS ex-domain		Renewable Energy Target certificate
Austria	EECS AIB full member					
Bangladesh					TIGR can be issued	
Belgium	EECS AIB full member					
Bosnia-Herzegovina				NECS ex-domain		
Brazil		I-RECS issuing	I-RECS production devices	NECS ex-domain		
Bulgaria				NECS ex-domain		
Canada				NECS ex-domain		
Chile		I-RECS issuing	I-RECS production devices	NECS ex-domain		
China		I-RECS issuing	I-RECS production devices	NECS ex-domain		
Colombia		I-RECS issuing	I-RECS production devices			
Costa Rica		I-RECS issuing				
Croatia	EECS AIB full member					
Cyprus	EECS AIB full member					
Czech Republic						
Democratic Republic of the Congo		I-RECS issuing				
Denmark	EECS AIB full member					
Egypt		I-RECS issuing				
Estonia	EECS AIB full member					
Finland	EECS AIB full member					
France	EECS AIB full member					
Germany	EECS AIB full member					
Greece	Full member (EECS AIB membership accepted - start 2020)					
Guatemala		I-RECS issuing	I-RECS production devices		TIGR production device	
Honduras		I-RECS issuing	I-RECS production devices			
Hong Kong				NECS ex-domain		
Hungary				NECS ex-domain		
Iceland	EECS AIB full member					
India		I-RECS issuing	I-RECS production devices (Note: Renewable Energy Certificate (REC) mechanism in India is developed to create a market-based instrument to promote renewable energy.)	NECS ex-domain		
Indonesia		I-RECS issuing	I-RECS production devices		TIGR can be issued	
Ireland	EECS AIB full member					
Israel		I-RECS issuing	I-RECS production devices	NECS ex-domain		
Italy	EECS AIB full member					
Japan		I-RECS redemption (Note: In April 2017, METI transformed its offset-credit scheme "J-credit system" to provide businesses with; offsetting credits and Energy Attribute Certificates (EAC) in the form of JCredits.)		NECS ex-domain (Note: NFV (FIT Non-Fossil Certificate))		
Jordan		I-RECS issuing	I-RECS production devices			
Kazakhstan				NECS ex-domain		
Latvia	EECS AIB Observer status			NECS ex-domain		
Lithuania	EECS AIB full member					
Luxembourg	EECS AIB full member					
Malaysia		I-RECS issuing	I-RECS production devices		TIGR production device	
Malta				NECS ex-domain		
Mexico		I-RECS issuing	I-RECS production devices	NECS ex-domain		Certificados de Energías Limpias (CEL)
Monaco				NECS ex-domain		
Montenegro	EECS AIB Observer status - applicant for membership			NECS ex-domain		
Morocco		I-RECS issuing	I-RECS production devices			
Netherlands	EECS AIB full member					
Nigeria		I-RECS issuing				
North Korea				NECS ex-domain		
North Macedonia				NECS ex-domain		
Norway	EECS AIB full member					
Oman		I-RECS issuing		NECS ex-domain		
Panama		I-RECS issuing				
Paraguay				NECS ex-domain		
Peru		I-RECS issuing		NECS ex-domain		
Philippines		I-RECS issuing	I-RECS production devices		TIGR production device	not implemented yet: Renewable Energy Registry mandated by the Renewable Energy Act of 2008 / not connected to TIGR
Poland				NECS ex-domain		
Portugal	EECS AIB observer status - applicant for membership			NECS ex-domain		
Puerto Rico				NECS ex-domain		
Qatar				NECS ex-domain		
Romania				NECS ex-domain		
Russia		I-RECS redemption		NECS ex-domain		
Saudi Arabia		I-RECS issuing		NECS ex-domain		
Serbia	EECS AIB full member					
Singapore		I-RECS issuing	I-RECS production devices	NECS ex-domain	TIGR production device	
Slovakia	EECS AIB full member					
Slovenia						
South Africa		I-RECS issuing	I-RECS production devices	NECS ex-domain		zaRECs (im Gespräch mit dem IB)
South Korea				NECS ex-domain		
Spain	EECS AIB full member		I-RECS production devices			
Sri Lanka		I-RECS issuing				
Sweden	EECS AIB full member					
Switzerland	EECS AIB full member (Note: Ongoing RED II discussion)					
Taiwan		I-RECS issuing (Note: Taiwan REC Standard (T-REC) In June 2017, Taiwan opened its National Renewable Energy Certification Center (T-REC Center) which issues contractual instruments. T-RECs may be used to prove the consumption of renewable electricity.)	I-RECS production devices (Note: Taiwan REC Standard (T-REC) In June 2017, Taiwan opened its National Renewable Energy Certification Center (T-REC Center) which issues contractual instruments. T-RECs may be used to prove the consumption of renewable electricity.)	NECS ex-domain (Note: Taiwan REC Standard (T-REC) In June 2017, Taiwan opened its National Renewable Energy Certification Center (T-REC Center) which issues contractual instruments. T-RECs may be used to prove the consumption of renewable electricity.)		
Thailand			I-RECS production devices	NECS ex-domain	TIGR production device	ppt and ewf to implement a blockchain-based and I-REC-connected registry
Turkey		I-RECS issuing	I-RECS production devices	NECS ex-domain		YEK-G
Uganda		I-RECS issuing	I-RECS production devices			
Ukraine				NECS ex-domain		
United Arab Emirates		I-RECS issuing	I-RECS production devices	NECS ex-domain		
United Kingdom				NECS ex-domain		
Uruguay				NECS ex-domain		
United States				NECS ex-domain / CDP does not recommend the usage of European GOOs for electricity consumption in the USA.		
Venezuela				NECS ex-domain		
Vietnam		I-RECS issuing	I-RECS production devices		TIGR production device	
