= European Energy Certificate System =

The European Energy Certificate System (EECS) is an integrated European framework for issuing, transferring and cancelling EU energy certificates. It was developed by the Association of Issuing Bodies to provide a properly regulated platform for Renewable Energy Guarantees of Origin, as proposed by the EU Renewable Energy Directive (RED). EECS supports all types of energy, regardless of source or production technology.

== Energy standard ==
The Guarantee of Origin includes information about the energy attributes of the electricity production to which it relates to such as source, capacity, and age of the plant.

The EECS was developed to serve as the standardization system for the European GOs. It is used by more than 28 countries that work with the AIB. The organization maintains that the certification system is intended to secure "in a manner consistent with European Community law and relevant national laws, that systems operating within the EECS framework are reliable, secure and interoperable." It is claimed that when most stakeholders refer to the GO voluntary market, they are referring to the standardized EECS-GO market.

The scope and focus of EECS now encompasses all forms of electricity, and supports Directive 2012/27/EC (the Energy Efficiency Directive). Work is currently under way to adapt EECS to support forms of energy other than electricity. The EECS Rules set out the energy certificate issuing activities of members of the AIB at an international level; while the implementation of EECS at a national or regional level is set out in a series of Domain Protocols.
