= The Carbon Principles =

Guidelines for assessing climate risk from electric power projects

The Carbon Principles are a series of guidelines established by three leading Wall Street banks—Citigroup Inc., JP Morgan Chase, and Morgan Stanley—to assess the risks in financing electric power projects in terms of climate change. They were created to identify the factors associated with the funding of electric power and carbon projects.These principles call for "enhanced diligence" in evaluating electric power industry borrowers in terms of their use of energy efficiency; renewable and low-carbon distributed energy technologies; and conventional and advanced generating technologies. These guidelines were announced in February 2008 to address the increasing public concern over the plans to create over one hundred coal power plants in the United States. The principles were created for investors, companies, and regulators to view and analyze. The implementation of the Carbon Principles was groundbreaking because it was the first time banks, power companies, and environmental groups collaborated on a project of this magnitude. The principles were launched in February 2008 and adopted by JPMorgan Chase, Morgan Stanley, and Citi as a guide to navigate investment meetings. The three principles are:

- Energy efficiency
- Renewable and low carbon distributed energy technologies
- Conventional and advanced generations

The Climate Principles are of a similar framework for the climate change practice of the financial sector. This is a comprehensive industry framework for a response to climate change and has been adopted by Crédit Agricole, Munich Re, Standard Chartered, Swiss Re and HSBC. The Carbon Principles are a development of consultation with the U.S. electricity utilities sector.

== Background ==
The 21st century brought about increased concern regarding environmental issues. Consumers began to put more pressure on corporations to adopt more sustainable practices. While this mostly affected energy and technology companies, other corporations felt the pressure to adopt more sustainable practices as well. Additionally, there was an increase in the implementation of environmental regulations. To address the concerns of customers and stakeholders, banks began to put more funding towards researching and developing environmentally sustainable initiatives. In their 2007 Annual Report, JPMorgan Chase describes devising the Carbon Principles as one of their key accomplishments. The Carbon Principles were one of the first steps taken towards sustainability by the financial sector. However, allocating financial resources towards more environmentally friendly alternatives was considered a risky investment at the time. JPMorgan Chase, Citi, and Morgan Stanley addressed the riskiness of such ventures in The Carbon Principles and offered solutions to investors.

== Further ==
- US Office of Critical Minerals and Energy Innovation
- Environmental & Energy Leader. (2007, February 4). Citigroup, JPMorgan and Morgan Stanley Unveil “Carbon Principles” [Review of Citigroup, JPMorgan and Morgan Stanley Unveil “Carbon Principles”]. Environment Energy Leader. https://www.environmentenergyleader.com/stories/citigroup-jpmorgan-and-morgan-stanley-unveil-carbon-principles,32700
- JPMorgan Chase. (2008). Building a Strong Foundation 2007 Annual Report. https://www.jpmorganchase.com/content/dam/jpmc/jpmorgan-chase-and-co/investor-relations/documents/2007ARComplete.pdf
- JPMorgan Chase. (2023). Carbon Market Principles: Our approach to strengthening the voluntary carbon market to scale decarbonization solutions [Review of Carbon Market Principles: Our approach to strengthening the voluntary carbon market to scale decarbonization solutions]. JPMorgan Chase & Co. https://www.jpmorganchase.com/content/dam/jpmc/jpmorgan-chase-and-co/documents/carbon-market-principles.pdf
- Morgan Stanley. (2025). Leading Wall Street Banks Establish The Carbon Principles | Morgan Stanley. https://www.morganstanley.com/press-releases/leading-wall-street-banks-establish-the-carbon-principles_6017
- Environment, U. N. (2023, October 31). Carbon Markets. UNEP - UN Environment Programme. https://www.unep.org/topics/climate-action/climate-finance/carbon-market
- "Burke, J., & Gambhir, A. (2025). Carbon markets for carbon dioxide removal. Climate Policy, 26(1), 1-17. https://www.tandfonline.com/doi/full/10.1080/14693062.2025.2478288?src=
