= Eugene Green Energy Standard =

The Eugene Green Energy Standard was an international standard to which national or international green electricity labelling schemes could be accredited to confirm that they provide genuine environmental benefits. It was designed to encourage the generation and use of additional renewable energy sources for electricity generation, although the limited use of additional natural gas-fired cogeneration plant was also supported. Initially funded in part through the EU's clean-e programme, but also including some participants from outside Europe, the Eugene standard was formally discontinued after February 2009.

== Dismantling ==
On 2 February 2009, EUGENE’s General Assembly voted in favour of its dismantling. It was agreed that the members and board would continue to work together to promote green energy in Europe, but that the EUGENE standard and the association (ASBL) under Belgian law would cease to exist.

== The standard ==
The standard confirmed that energy supplied under the accredited schemes:

- Is produced from genuinely sustainable energy sources.
- Will result in a real increase in renewable generation beyond the requirements imposed by government ('additionality').
- That the demand from consumers is matched by renewable generation.

Two variations of the standard, 'gold' and 'silver', differentiated between schemes depending on the additionality of new renewable energy supplied. The development of the standard was aided by the European Union's CLEAN-E initiative during 2005 and 2006

== Accredited energy labels ==
National energy labels formerly accredited by EUGENE included:

Germany: OK Power
Switzerland: Naturemade Star

The organisation also recommends certain other national schemes that are progressing towards accreditation, including:

Finland: EKOenergy
Netherlands: Milieukeur
Sweden: Bra Miljöval

There was no Eugene accredited scheme in the United Kingdom. The UK's energy regulator (Ofgem) published guidelines in February 2009 that broadly followed the EUGENE standard, requiring matching and additionality through carbon savings, although allowing the latter to be met through energy efficiency or offsetting, as well as through new renewables schemes. These were implemented in February 2010 in the UK's Green Energy Supply Certification Scheme.

The Eugene Standard had also been adopted in Chile, while a pilot scheme is in progress in France.

== The Eugene Network ==
The standard was managed by the Eugene Network (formerly the European Green Electricity Network), an international membership-based non-profit organization. The Network aimed to coordinate and harmonise green energy labelling nationally and internationally, promote the adoption of the Eugene Standard as the basis for national and international green energy markets, and encourage consumers and suppliers to choose credible green energy products. Formal discussions on the Eugene standard first took place in 2000, led by the World Wide Fund for Nature, and it was officially launched on 24 June 2002. The Eugene Network was legally established in 2003 and the first national energy labels were accredited in 2004.

Full voting membership of the Network was open to 'citizen organisations pursuing not for profit activities with the objectives of promoting green electricity but with no direct interests in the generation and supply of energy services'. Organisations outside this scope but which do 'have a commitment and interest in creating a viable green energy market' were able to become non-voting associate members or supporters.

As of June 2007, the members of the Eugene Network were:

World Wide Fund for Nature
Chile: Instituto de Ecología Política
Finland: Finnish Association for Nature Conservation
France: Comité de Liaison Energies Renouvelables
Germany: EnergieVision
Spain: Asociacion para la Defensa de la Naturaleza
Sweden: Swedish Society for Nature Conservation
Switzerland: Association for Environmental Friendly Electricity (VUE)
Switzerland: Swiss Federal Institute for Environmental Science and Technology (EAWAG)

== See also ==
- EKOenergy
- Electricity retailing
- Energy conservation
- Energy policy
- Energy quality
- Environmental concerns with electricity generation
- Global warming
- ISO 14001
- Low-carbon economy
- REN21
