= Association of Issuing Bodies =

The Association of Issuing Bodies (AIB) promotes the use of a standardised system European Energy Certificate System (EECS), based on structures and procedures to ensure the reliable operation of international energy certificate systems. European Energy Certificate System (EECS) is set out in "The EECS Rules" and its supporting documents.

The work of the AIB is relevant to all electricity customers, as the Guarantee of Origin (the instrument created in the European Directive and standardised through EECS) is a cornerstone of providing reliable disclosure information on the origin of electricity supplied to consumers.
