= Renewables Obligation (United Kingdom) =

British order requiring renewable electricity generation

The Renewables Obligation (RO) is a market support mechanism designed to encourage generation of electricity from eligible renewable sources in the United Kingdom. There are three related schemes for the three legal jurisdictions of the UK. In April 2002 the Renewables Obligation was introduced in England and Wales, and in Scotland as the Renewables Obligation (Scotland). The RO was introduced in Northern Ireland in April 2005. In all cases, the RO replaced the Non-Fossil Fuel Obligation which operated from 1990.

The RO placed an obligation on licensed electricity suppliers in the United Kingdom to source an increasing proportion of electricity from renewable sources, similar to a renewable portfolio standard. This figure was initially set at 3% for the period 2002/03, and in 2010/11 it was 11.1% (4.0% in Northern Ireland). By 2020 it was almost half of all electricity in England, Wales and Scotland, and nearly 20% in Northern Ireland. An extension of the scheme from 2027 to 2037 was declared on 1 April 2010 and is detailed in the National Renewable Energy Action Plan. In 2026, the RO subsidised more than 30% of the UK's electricity generation.

The RO closed to new generation between March 2015 and March 2017, with some grace periods. It was replaced by the Contracts for Difference scheme. Accredited generating stations will continue to receive 20 years of support, until March 2037.

== Implementation ==
Suppliers meet their obligations by presenting Renewable Obligation Certificates (ROCs) to Ofgem. Where suppliers do not have sufficient ROCs to cover their obligation, a payment is made into the buy-out fund. The buy-out price suppliers pay is a fixed price per MWh shortfall and is adjusted in line with the Retail Prices Index (RPI) each year. The proceeds of the buy-out fund are paid back to suppliers in proportion to how many ROCs they have presented. For example, if they were to submit 5% of the total number of ROCs submitted they would receive 5% of the total funds that defaulting supply companies pay into the buy-out fund.

ROCs are intended to create a market, and be traded at market prices that differ from the official buy-out price. If there was an excess of renewable production beyond the supplier obligation, the price of ROCs would fall below the buy-out price. The price of ROCs could approach zero if renewable and non-renewable generation costs became similar, when there would be little or no subsidy of renewable generation. If there is less renewable production than the obligation, the price of ROCs would increase above the buy-out price, as purchasers anticipate later payments from the buy-out fund on each ROC.

Obligation periods run for one year, beginning on 1 April and running to 31 March. Supply companies have until the 31 August following the period to submit sufficient ROCs to cover their obligation, or to submit sufficient payment to the buy-out fund to cover the shortfall.

The cost of ROCs is effectively paid by electricity customers of supply companies that fail to present sufficient ROCs, whilst reducing the cost to customers of supply companies who submit large numbers of ROCs, assuming that all costs and savings are passed on to customers.

== Percentages and prices by year ==
The percentage of electricity to be supplied by renewable electricity under the scheme generally increased each year. This is set separately for Great Britain (England and Wales plus Scotland) and for Northern Ireland.

Obligation perion (1 April to 31 March)	% of supply		Buy out price (£/MWh)	Effective price per unit (p/kWh)
Obligation perion (1 April to 31 March)	England and Wales and Scotland	Northern Ireland	Buy out price (£/MWh)	Effective price per unit (p/kWh)
2002–2003	3.0		£30.00	0.09
2003–2004	4.3		£30.51	0.13
2004–2005	4.9		£31.39	0.15
2005–2006	5.5		£32.33	0.18
2006–2007	6.7		£33.24	0.22
2007–2008	7.9		£34.30	0.29
2008–2009	9.1		£35.76	0.33
2009–2010	9.7	3.5	£37.19	0.36
2010–2011	11.1	4.3	£36.99	0.41
2011–2012	12.4	5.5	£38.69	0.48
2012–2013	15.8	8.1	£40.71	0.64
2013–2014	20.6	9.7	£42.02	0.87
2014–2015	24.4	10.7	£43.30	1.06
2015–2016	29.0	11.9	£44.33	1.29
2016–2017	34.8	14.2	£44.77	1.56
2017–2018	40.9	16.7	£45.58	1.86
2018–2019	46.8	18.5	£47.22	
2019–2020	48.4	19.0	£48.78	
2020–2021	47.1	18.5	£50.05	
2021–2022	49.2	19.4	£50.80	
2022–2023	49.1	19.3	£52.88	
2023–2024	46.9	18.4	£59.01	
2024–2025			£64.73	

== Certificates ==
A ROC is the green certificate issued for eligible renewable electricity generated within the United Kingdom and supplied to customers in the United Kingdom by a licensed supplier. ROCs are issued by Ofgem to accredited renewable generators (or in the case of generating stations subject to a NFFO (non-fossil fuels obligation), Scottish Renewables Obligation or Northern Ireland NFFO contract, to the nominated electricity supplier). The Scottish Renewables Obligation was superseded by the Renewables Obligation (Scotland) in 2002.

The default is that one ROC is issued for each megawatt-hour (MWh) of eligible renewable output. Some technologies get more, some less. For instance, offshore wind installations receive 2 ROCs per MWh; onshore wind installations receive 0.9 ROCs per MWh and sewage gas-fired plants receive half a ROC per MWh.

ROCs are issued into the ROC Register and so are electronic certificates. Normally, a renewable generator will transfer the related ROCs through Ofgem's electronic registry when it sells power to an electricity supplier.

== Legislation ==
The Utilities Act 2000 gives the Secretary of State the power to require electricity suppliers to supply a certain proportion of their total sales in the United Kingdom from electricity generated from renewable sources. A Renewables Obligation Order is issued annually detailing the precise level of the obligation for the coming year-long period of obligation and the level of the buy-out price. The Renewables Obligation (England and Wales) was introduced by the Department of Trade and Industry, the Renewables Obligation (Scotland) was introduced by the Scottish Executives and the Northern Ireland Renewables Obligation was introduced by the Department of Enterprise Trade and Investment (DETINI). The Orders were subject to review in 2005/06 and new Orders came into effect on 1 April 2006. The relevant pieces of legislation for the period April 2006 – March 2007 are:

- The Renewables Obligation Order 2006 (Statutory Instrument (SI) 2006 No. 1004)
- The Renewables Obligation (Scotland) Order 2006 (SI 2006 No. 173), and
- The Renewables Obligation Order (Northern Ireland) 2006 (SI 2006 No. 56).

All pieces of legislation are published on the National Archives legislation site.

== Ofgem's role ==
Ofgem is the Office of Gas and Electricity Markets in Great Britain. The Orders detail Ofgem's powers and functions to administer the Renewables Obligation. These functions include:

- Accrediting generating stations as being capable of generating electricity from eligible renewable sources
- Issuing ROCs and revoking these as necessary
- Establishing and maintaining a Register of ROCs
- Monitoring compliance with the requirements of the Orders
- Calculating annually the buy-out price
- Receiving buy-out payments and redistributing the buy-out fund
- Receiving late payments and redistributing the late payment fund, and
- Publishing an annual report on the operation of and compliance with the requirements of the Orders.

Ofgem also administers the Northern Ireland Renewables Obligation (NIRO) on behalf of the Northern Ireland Authority for Energy Regulation (NIAER).

== Types of energy eligible ==
The following sources of electricity are eligible for ROCs (although the scheme is closed to new entrants):

- Biogas from anaerobic digestion
- Biomass
- Combined Heat and Power (CHP)
- Hydroelectricity
- Tidal power
- Wind power
- Photovoltaic cells
- Landfill gas
- Sewage gas
- Wave power

Co-firing of biomass is also eligible. Not all technologies which are eligible are actually supported, due to cost. Some renewable sources of electricity are not eligible for ROCs (e.g. larger hydroelectric schemes which were in operation before April 2002).

== Objectives and banding ==
The Renewables Obligation was, until 2015, the UK Government's main policy measure for stimulating the growth of electricity generation from renewable sources. In 2010, the Government envisaged that 30% of electricity demand would need to be generated by renewable sources in order for the UK to meet a legally binding EU target of obtaining 15% of energy from renewable sources by 2020.

The Renewables Obligation is a market-based mechanism designed to incentivise the generation of electricity from renewable energy sources over more traditional alternatives at a reasonable cost. When it was introduced in 2002, each form of renewable energy technology received the same level of support, namely one ROC for each MWh of electricity generated. This was a conscious decision as the Government was keen to promote a market-led approach, emphasising competition between technologies to minimise cost, and did not want to distort the market by appearing to place the importance of certain technologies above others.

As a result, whilst being ostensibly technology-neutral, the Renewables Obligation in its original form favoured the deployment of the more established, near-market technologies such as landfill gas and onshore wind, those which were most economically efficient, over less well developed technologies that were further from commercial viability.

A review of the performance of the Renewables Obligation was announced in 2003. Modelling of future deployment scenarios indicated that targets would not be met with current levels of support due to constraints on the availability and deployment of the most established technologies. A significant contribution would therefore be required from less mature technologies which lacked sufficient incentive to develop into feasible alternatives under the original scheme.

The Government announced its intention to reform the Renewables Obligation in 2006. Banding was introduced in 2009 to provide differing levels of support to groups of technologies depending upon their relative maturity, development cost and associated risk. Whilst increasing the incentive for technologies in the early stages of development, this also allowed the level of support for well-established technologies to be reduced to avoid over-subsidisation.

In reforming the Renewables Obligation in this way, and scheduling regular future reviews, the Government recognised that the market would not deliver the mix of renewable energy generation required to meet the targets if the incentives remained technology-neutral. It was therefore necessary for the Government to perform a continuing strategic role and retain the capability to intervene if necessary. The introduction of banding allowed the Government to steer industry towards investment in less well developed forms of renewable energy to enable them to contribute to meeting the long-term targets, rather than concentrating investment in technologies that are economically favourable in the short term.

Changes to the banding levels for 2013–2017 included a reduction in the tariff for onshore wind to 0.9 ROCs/MWh and an increase for small wave and tidal stream projects, under 30 MW, to 5 ROCs/MWh.

== Government review ==
The obligation was reviewed by government following a consultation period that finished in September 2007. The document at the centre of the consultation set out an amended form of the RO which would see different technologies earn different numbers of ROCs.

In January 2007, Ofgem called for the Renewables Obligation to be replaced, claiming that the scheme was a 'very costly way' of supporting renewable electricity generation. In particular, they were concerned that electricity customers paid for renewables projects even if they were not built due to failure to obtain planning permission, and the failure of the Renewables Obligation to link financial support for renewables to either the electricity price or the price of renewables in the European Union Emissions Trading Scheme.

In response, the British Wind Energy Association – whose members are major beneficiaries of the existing scheme – said that Ofgem was partly responsible for the costs because it failed to prioritise work on the National Grid which would allow more renewable capacity to be connected. They also stressed the need to maintain stability in the marketplace to maintain the confidence of investors. The concerns of both bodies were shared by the Renewable Energy Association.

The Scottish Wind Assessment Project criticised the scheme in 2005 for rewarding reductions in renewable electricity output: two electricity suppliers, Scottish and Southern Energy and Npower, down-rated several large hydro-power stations in order to qualify for Renewables Obligation Certificates.

== 2010s reforms and scheme closure ==
The UK Government proposed wide-ranging reforms to the UK electricity market which saw feed-in tariffs with contracts for difference (CfD) replace the Renewables Obligation as the main renewable generation support mechanism. Unlike ROCs, CfDs are also available to generators of nuclear electricity.

Other than with respect to large scale (>5MW) solar photovoltaic power projects and onshore wind power projects, the Renewables Obligation remained open to new generation until 31 March 2017, allowing new renewable generation that came online between 2014 (when it was anticipated the CfDs would start) and 2017 to choose between CfDs and ROCs. After that date, the government intended to close the Renewables Obligation to new generation while continuing existing ROCs, meaning that levels and length of support for existing participants in the Renewables Obligation would be maintained.

However, the UK government subsequently announced that it would bring forward the deadline for Renewables Obligation accreditation for large scale (>5MW) solar photovoltaic power projects, to 1 April 2015. The government further announced on 18 June 2015 that it intended to close the Renewables Obligation to new onshore wind power projects on 1 April 2016, bringing the deadline forward by one year.

In addition to the introduction of feed-in tariffs, the UK Government's proposed electricity market reform included two further initiatives to encourage the decarbonisation of electricity generation: a Carbon Price Floor and an Emissions Performance Standard.

=== Renewables Obligation closure dates and grace periods ===
The RO schemes closed to new generation as follows.

- England and Wales and Scotland:
  - All, except solar PV and onshore wind: 31 March 2017
  - Onshore wind: 12 May 2016
  - Solar PV ≤ 5 MW: 31 March 2016
  - Solar PV > 5 MW: 31 March 2015
- Northern Ireland:
  - All, except onshore wind: 31 March 2017
  - Onshore wind ≤ 5 MW: 30 June 2016
  - Onshore wind > 5 MW: 31 March 2016

A series of grace periods were set out, where generating stations could be accredited after the closure date, subject to meeting the following criteria. The first three applied until 31 March 2018, with the latter three until 30 September 2018.

- Connection delays caused by grid and/or radar.
- Where signed investment contracts were terminated under specific circumstances.
- Where offshore wind or ACT projects could demonstrate evidence of substantial financial decisions and investments made before 9 November 2014.
- Projects allocated a place within the 400 MW dedicated biomass cap.
- Scottish offshore wind using test and demonstration or floating wind turbines.
- Where biomass with CHP projects could demonstrate evidence of substantial financial decisions and investments made before 9 November 2014.

== Proposed changes to inflation indexation ==
In October 2025, the UK government launched a consultation on changing the inflation indexation for the RO and related FIT schemes, both of which are currently linked to the RPI. However, RPI tends to over-estimate growth compared to other metrics such as the Consumer Price Index (CPI). Switching to the CPI is expected to reduce the costs of the scheme—ultimately paid by electricity bill payers—by reducing the amount paid to electricity generators.

Three options were proposed: switching immediately to either CPI or the related CPIH index, or pausing indexation until the CPI catches up with the RPI. The first two would reduce costs of the scheme by around £20m to £250m a year, with the latter reducing cost by £300m to £800m per year. The Association of Investment Companies (AIC) criticised the proposal, suggesting it would impact investor confidence for future renewable energy projects. The AIC calculated the changes would only reduce household bills by £3 a year, but would reduce trust in the UK government's long term stability, and could increase future costs to consumers if investors lost confidence.

On 28 January 2026, it was announced the scheme would be re-indexed to CPI from April.

== See also ==
- Electricity billing in the UK
- Future Energy (former green electricity accreditation scheme)
- Green electricity
- Green tags
- Non-Fossil Fuel Obligation
- Contracts for Difference (UK electricity market support)
- Renewable Energy Certificates (United States) – a similar mechanism in the US
- United Kingdom Climate Change Programme
