= List of restaurant chains in Ireland =

This is a list of notable restaurant chains in Ireland.

== Casual dining restaurants ==
- Camile
- The Counter
- Eddie Rocket's
- Five Guys
- Gourmet Burger Kitchen
- Hard Rock Cafe
- Harry Ramsden's
- Leo Burdock

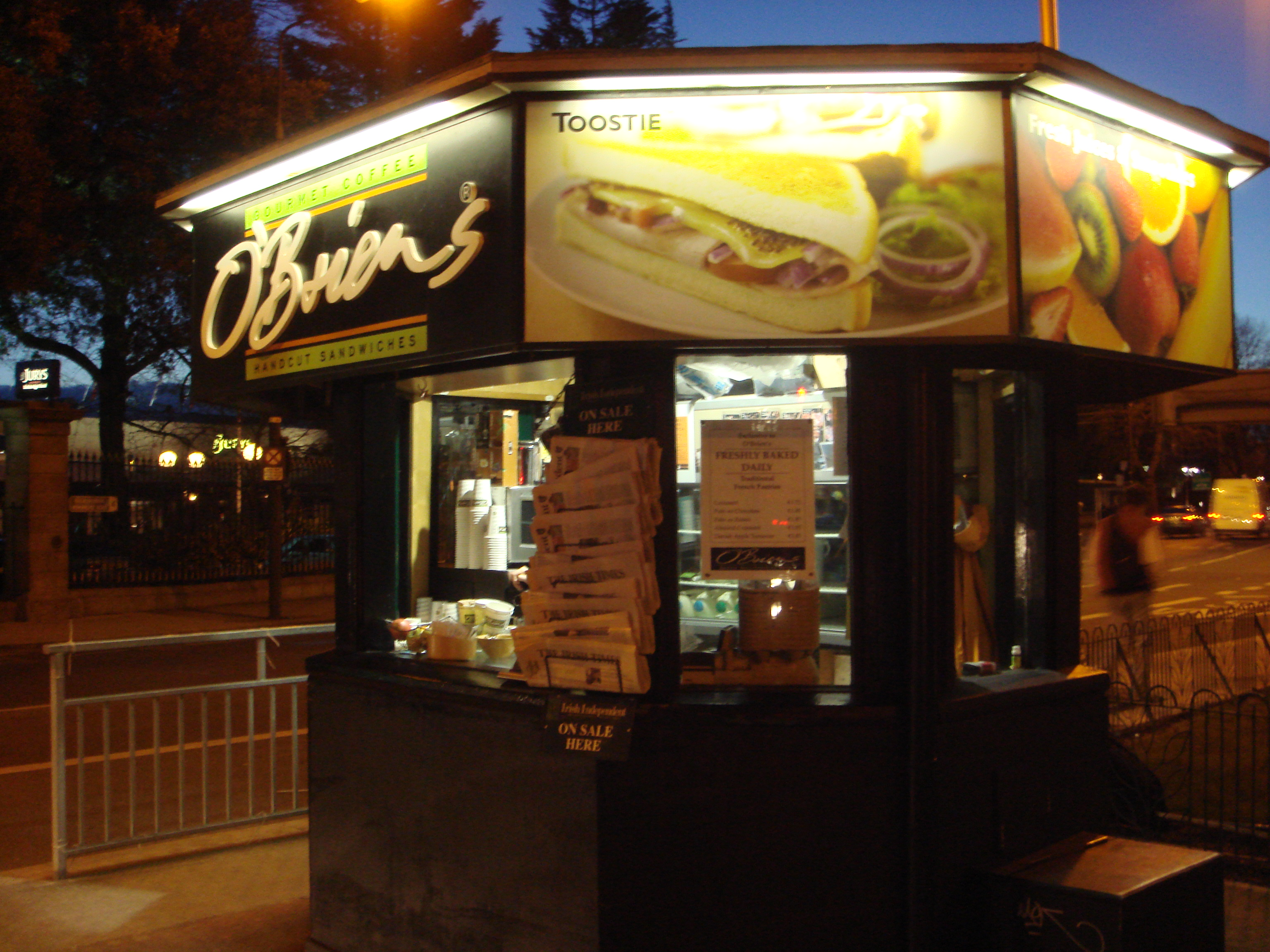
O'Briens Irish Sandwich Bar kiosk, Ballsbridge, Dublin

- Mao
- Milano
- Nando's
- O'Briens Irish Sandwich Bars
- Pizza Hut
- T.G.I. Friday's
- Upper Crust
- Wagamama
- Yo! Sushi
- Zizzi

== Coffeehouses ==
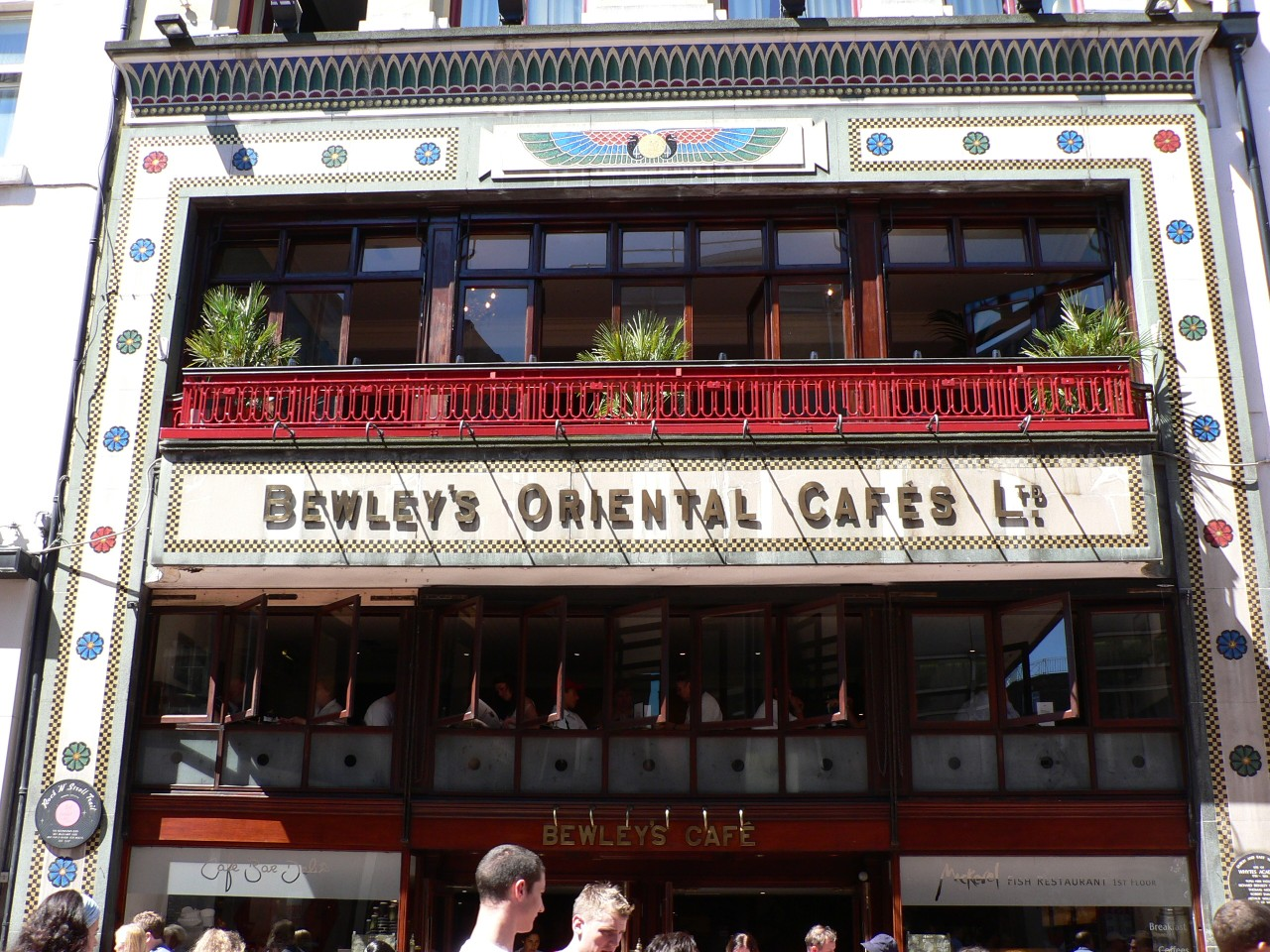
Bewley's, Grafton Street, Dublin

- AMT Coffee
- Bewley's
- Butlers Chocolate Café
- Caffè Nero
- Caffè Ritazza
- Costa Coffee
- Esquires
- Gloria Jean's
- Insomnia Coffee Company
- Starbucks

== Fast-food restaurants ==
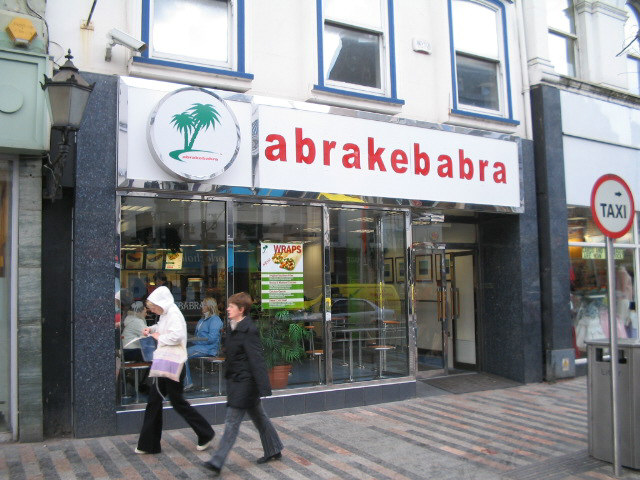
Abrakebabra, Patrick Street, Cork, Ireland

- Abrakebabra
- Apache Pizza
- Boojum
- Burger King
- Chick-fil-A
- Domino's Pizza
- Five Guys
- Freshly Chopped
- Four Star Pizza
- KFC
- Krispy Kreme
- McDonald's
- Popeyes (2026)
- Papa John's Pizza
- Pizza Express (Milano)
- Pizza Hut
- Slim Chickens
- Subway
- Supermac's
- Taco Bell
- Wendy’s
- Wingstop
- Zambrero

== See also ==
- Lists of restaurants
