= Everyman Theatre =

Everyman Theatre is the name of a number of theatres:

== Australia ==
- Everyman Theatres (1948–1951), a touring project of Melbourne Little Theatre and Victorian C.A.E.

== Europe ==
- Everyman Theatre, Cheltenham, a theatre in Gloucestershire
- Everyman Theatre, Liverpool, a theatre in Liverpool, England
- Everyman Cinema, Hampstead, a cinema in Hampstead, London, formerly the Everyman Theatre (1920–26)
- Everyman Palace Theatre, a theatre in Cork, Ireland

== United States ==
- Everyman Theatre, Baltimore, a theatre in Maryland, US

== See also ==
- Everyman Cinema (disambiguation)
