= Byron Hamburgers =

British restaurant chain

Famously Proper Ltd.
- Company type: Private limited company
- Industry: Restaurants
- Founded: 2007; 19 years ago
- Headquarters: London, England, UK
- Number of locations: 7
- Area served: United Kingdom
- Key people: Simon Wilkinson (CEO)
- Products: Burgers
- Parent: Calveton UK Limited
- Website: www.byron.co.uk

Byron (legally incorporated as Famously Proper Limited) is a British restaurant chain offering a casual dining service with a focus on hamburgers. The chain was founded in 2007 by Tom Byng. In July 2020, during the COVID-19 pandemic in the United Kingdom, the chain closed outlets as part of a deal transferring 21 remaining sites and 551 staff to a new owner, Calveton UK.

== Locations ==
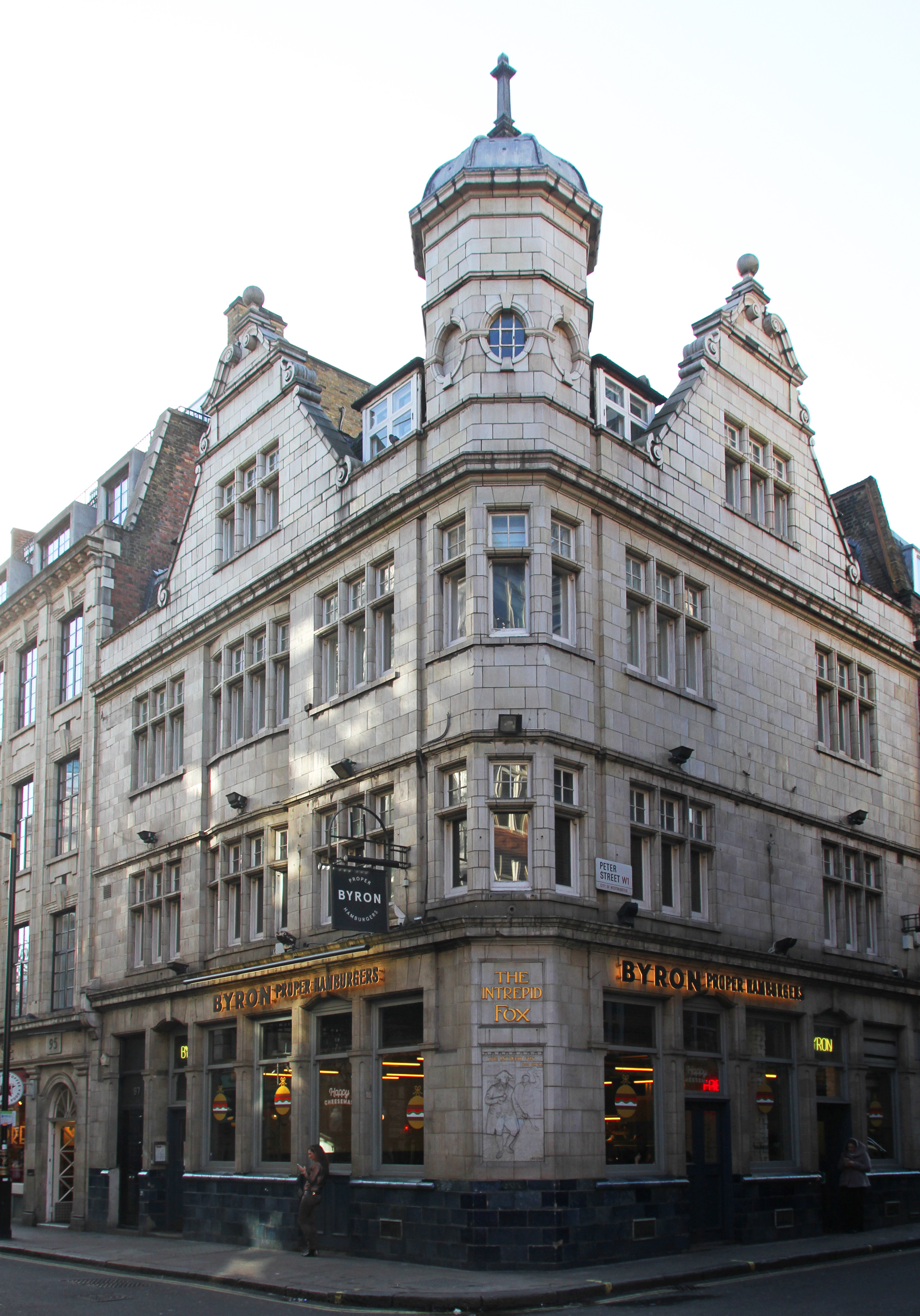
Byron burger bar, the former Intrepid Fox, Soho, London

The burger chain had 67 branches at its peak in 2018. However, due to financial issues it has gradually reduced the number of restaurants. By August 2020, it had 21 branches across the country. By January 2023, it had further reduced its operations to 12 branches.

== History ==
The burger chain was founded in London in 2007 by Tom Byng, who developed the idea for the company while living in New York City, during which time he would regularly eat at the Silver Top Diner in Providence, Rhode Island.

The chain was owned by Gondola Group, which also owns Ask and Zizzi. Gondola announced plans to sell Byron in October 2012. Potential buyers included Quilvest, owners of YO! Sushi. In June 2013 Gondola stated that it was abandoning plans to sell Byron, after offers failed to reach the company's estimated £100m price tag, and decided to accelerate expansion of Byron instead.

In October 2013, Hutton Collins Partners finally put in the £100 million offer and the chain was sold. In 2017, Hutton Collins sold a majority stake in Byron Hamburgers to Three Hills Capital Partners, with FPP Asset Management also becoming a new investor, while retaining a minority stake.

On 29 June 2020, during the COVID-19 pandemic, Three Hills announced it was preparing to place the 51-restaurant chain into administration, hoping to trigger a quick pre-pack sale. Just over a month later, on 31 July 2020, the chain announced it was permanently closing more than half its 51 outlets, with the loss of 650 jobs, as part of a deal transferring the remaining 20 sites and 551 staff to a new owner, Calveton UK.

In January 2023, the company announced that it had entered administration for the second time in three years, with 9 restaurants closing immediately with the loss of 365 jobs. This left the firm with 12 branches.

== Dark kitchens ==
In August 2020, Byron announced the opening of five delivery-only ghost restaurants. Pre-Covid the company's delivery channel was understood to be ahead of 10% like-for-like revenue.

== Controversies ==
In July 2016, the company attracted adverse publicity after calling their London workers to a faked Health and Safety briefing following a request by the Home Office. Immigration officials present at the venue arrested several employees, deporting 35 illegal immigrants. This led to protests outside several of their branches in London, including the release of live cockroaches and locusts at some premises and a call to boycott the chain.

A customer suffered an anaphylactic reaction after eating grilled chicken marinaded in buttermilk at the Byron restaurant at The O2 Arena in London on 22 April 2017 and died. The company's allergen procedures were shown to be in line with the FSA's existing rules and regulations and, following the inquest, the company announced that it would work with regulators to ensure that standards are improved across the industry.

== See also ==
- List of hamburger restaurants
