= Philip Kaye =

British businessman

- Born: Philip Kropifko; December 1931 (age 94)
- Occupations: businessman and restaurateur
- Known for: founder of Garfunkel's Restaurants
- Children: Adam Kaye and Samuel Kaye

Philip Kaye (born December 1931) is a British businessman and restaurateur, and the founder of the Garfunkel's Restaurant casual dining chain.

== Early life ==
Philip Kaye was born in December 1931. The family name was originally Kropifko. In 1953, his brother Reginald Kropifko, a handbag manufacturer, of 21 Bryanston Mansions, York Street, London W1, changed his name by deed poll to Reginald Kaye.

== Career ==
Kaye and his late brother Reginald Kaye started running Wimpy franchises, before establishing the Golden Egg brand, one of the UK's first national restaurant chains.

Kaye by himself then founded the Garfunkel's Restaurant casual dining chain, and later Deep Pan Pizza, Chi Chis and Café Uno.

In 2015, the Kaye family restaurant holdings included the Prezzo, ASK Italian, and Zizzi chains.

== Personal life ==
He is the father of Adam Kaye and Samuel Kaye, co-founders of the ASK Italian casual dining chain.
