= Camile (restaurant chain) =

Irish restaurant chain serving Thai food

- Company type: Private
- Industry: Restaurant
- Genre: Restaurant and takeaway chain serving Thai food
- Founded: 2010
- Headquarters: Dublin, Ireland
- Number of locations: 45 (2021)
- Area served: Republic of Ireland, United Kingdom
- Website: camile.ie

Camile is an Irish restaurant chain, serving Thai cuisine. Originating in Dolphin's Barn, Dublin in 2010, the chain was co-founded by Brody Sweeney (previously associated with the O'Briens Irish Sandwich Bars chain). The chain, which operates via a franchise restaurant model, has since expanded throughout Ireland and the UK, with 45 locations as of 2021. As of June 2021, it was also reportedly expanding via a "partnership" model in the United States.

== See also ==
- List of restaurant chains in Ireland
- List of Thai restaurants
