= AMT =

An amt is a type of administrative division in Germany.

AMT or amt, may also refer to:

== Science and technology ==
- Air Motion Transformer, a type of loudspeaker invented by Oskar Heil
- Alpha-Methyltryptamine (αMT), a synthetic psychedelic of the tryptamine family
- Amazon Mechanical Turk
- Aminomethyltransferase, gene for an enzyme that breaks down glycine
- Amorphous metal transformer, a kind of energy efficient transformer
- Audio-magnetotellurics, a higher-frequency variant of magnetotellurics
- Intel Active Management Technology, a technology for remotely managing and securing computers

== Transportation ==
- Aircraft maintenance technician, a term used in the US
- Amata Airport (IATA airport code "AMT")
- ATA Airlines, a defunct US airline (ICAO code "AMT")
- Aldermaston railway station in the county of Berkshire, UK (National Rail code "AMT")
- Automated manual transmission, gearbox technology
- Aviation Maintenance Technician, a US Coast Guard rating

== Organizations ==
- Agence métropolitaine de transport, former name of the regional transit system in Montréal, Canada
- Aguman ding Maldang Talapagobra, a Philippine trade union
- Aluminum Model Toys, US maker of scale model cars
- American Maglev Technology
- American Medical Technologists, an American allied health professional association
- American Tower (NYSE: AMT), an American telecommunications company
- AMT Coffee, defunct UK chain of kiosks
- AMT Genova, (Azienda Mobilità e Trasporti), public transport in Italy
- Arcadia Machine & Tool, a former American firearms company
- Archivo de la Memoria Trans, an Argentine transgender community archive
- Association for Manufacturing Technology, US
- Australian Mathematics Trust, a not-for-profit educational society

== Time standards ==
- Airy Mean Time, a time standard used for timekeeping on Mars
- Armenia Time, national time zone code for Armenia

== Other uses ==
- Acid Mothers Temple, Japanese rock band
- Alternative minimum tax, US
- Anthony McDonald-Tipungwuti, an Australian rules footballer
- Atmospheric Measurement Techniques, a European Geosciences Union journal

== See also ==
- AMTS (disambiguation)
