= Boojum =

Boojum may refer to:

- A fictional animal species in Lewis Carroll's nonsense poem The Hunting of the Snark; a particularly dangerous kind of snark
- Jud Wilson (Jud "Boojum" Wilson), American baseball player
- Boojum (superfluidity), a phenomenon in physics associated with superfluid helium-3
- Boojum tree or cirio of the Baja California peninsula in Mexico
- SSM-A-5 Boojum, a planned, but never completed, supersonic version of the SM-62 Snark, an intercontinental cruise missile
- Boojum (restaurant), a chain of Mexican restaurants in Ireland
