= Cinven =

Global private equity firm

Cinven Limited
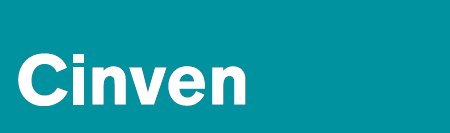
- Type: Private
- Industry: Private equity
- Founded: 1977; 49 years ago
- Headquarters: London, United Kingdom
- Key people: Stuart McAlpine, Managing Partner
- Products: Private equity
- Website: www.cinven.com

Cinven Limited is a global private equity firm founded in 1977, with offices in nine international locations in Guernsey, London, New York, Paris, Frankfurt, Milan, Luxembourg, Madrid, and Hong Kong that acquires Europe and United States–based corporations, and emerging market firms that fit with their core businesses, and necessitate a minimum equity investment of €100 million or more. As of 2024, it has €44 billion in assets under management.

Cinven's funding base originally came solely from three pension funds in the United Kingdom (British Coal, the Railway Industry and Barclays Bank) who remain as important investors. Cinven has been reported to originally stand for Coal Investment Nominees' for Venture Capital.

Cinven invests in six sectors on an international basis: Business Services; Technology, Media and Telecommunications; Financial Services; Industrials; Healthcare; and Consumer.

In July 2021, the firm was fined £43m by the UK Competition and Markets Authority for its part in a generic drug pricefixing scandal, which had resulted in the National Health Service being overcharged by "hundreds of millions of pounds" over several years.

In January 2024, Cinven raised $14.5 billion for its eighth private equity fund.

== Investments ==
Cinven is a private equity firm based in London. Some of the recent acquisitions include:

- Avio – In August 2006, Cinven purchased Avio from Carlyle and Finmeccanica for an enterprise value of $2.6 billion.
- Spire Healthcare (previously BUPA Hospitals) – In June 2007, BUPA announced that it had agreed to sell its hospitals business, comprising 25 hospitals, to Cinven for $1.44 billion ($2.8 billion/$2.13 billion). Spire has since acquired the Classics Hospital Group for GBP 145 million, as well as a single site hospital in Gerrards Cross, England.
- Gondola Holdings – acquired in June 2007 for $1.36 billion, Gondola is the market leader in the casual dining sector in the United Kingdom, with brands such as PizzaExpress, ASK, Zizzi and BYRON.
- SLV – acquired in April 2011, SLV is a provider of residential and technical lighting products
- Partnership Assurance – acquired in 2008
- Sebia – acquired in June 2010
- CPA Global – acquired in March 2012
- AMCo – Created from Amdipharm and Mercury Pharma bought in 2012, merged, built up and sold to Canada's Concordia Healthcare in September 2015 for $3.4 billion in cash and shares.
- CeramTec Group – acquired in June 2013
- Host Europe Group – acquired in July 2013, Cinven agreed to purchase this web hosting firm for around $666 million.
- Medpace – In February 2014, Cinven agreed to acquire the pharmaceutical contract research organisation from CCMP Capital for around $900 million.
- Northgate Public Services – In December 2014, Cinven agreed to acquire the public services division of Northgate Information Solutions for an undisclosed amount.
- UFINET – In 2014, Cinven bought the telecommunications business of Gas Natural Fenosa for more than 500 million US dollars.
- Premium Credit – In January 2015, Cinven acquired Premium Credit, the United Kingdom's biggest premium financing company.
- Labco – In May 2015, Cinven agreed to acquire this operator of medical diagnostics laboratories for €1.2 billion.
- Synlab Group acquired in June 2015 for €1.7 to 1.8 billion.
- Kurt Geiger – In December 2015, Cinven acquired United Kingdom based fashion retailer Kurt Geiger from Sycamore Partners for £245 million.
- Hotelbeds - In September 2016, Cinven and Canada Pension Plan Investment Board (CPPIB) acquired the business-to-business accommodation wholesaler for a purchase price of around 1.3 billion euros.
- Stada Arzneimittel – In August 2017, Cinven acquired German company Stada Arzneimittel.
- One.Com – In December 2018, Cinven acquired, from Accel-KKR, one of the Europe's biggest hosting providers with 1,5M customers.
- RTB House – In January 2019, Cinven invested in Polish company RTB House.
- Drake Software – In February 2021, Cinven announced its investment in this provider of professional tax preparation software.
- True Potential – In September 2021, it was announced that Cinven were acquiring a majority stake in the UK based wealth management company True Potential. The deal valued True Potential at a figure between £1.6 billion and £2 billion. Cinven completed the acquisition of the company in February 2022.
- TaxAct – In November 2022, Cinven agreed to acquire American online DIY tax software provider from Blucora, Inc. for about $720 million. It announced that it would combine TaxAct's business with Drake Software under a single holding company.
- Flint Global – In December 2025, Cinven agreed to acquire a majority stake in UK-based political and strategic advisory firm Flint Global for at approximately £190 million. The founders and partner group retained significant stakes in the business, with Cinven planning to support its further international expansion.
