= AMTS =

AMTS may refer to:

- Automated Motorized Total station, in surveying, instrumentation, and monitoring
- Abbreviated mental test score, in medicine
- Advanced Mobile Telephone System, a 0G method of radio communication
- Automated Maritime Telecommunications System, a commercial mobile radio service used within the US
- Ahmedabad Municipal Transport Service, runs the public bus service in Ahmedabad, India

== See also ==
- AMT (disambiguation)
