= Adam Kay =

Adam Kay may refer to:

- Adam Kay (footballer) (born 1990)
- Adam Kay (writer) (born 1980), British comedian, writer, musician, and doctor

== See also ==
- Adam Kaye (born 1968), British businessman and restaurateur
