= Everyman Cinema =

Everyman Cinema may refer to:

- Everyman Cinemas
- Everyman Cinema, Hampstead
- Everyman Cinema, Muswell Hill
- Everyman Cinema, Winchester
