= Adam Kaye =

British businessman and restaurateur

- Born: September 1968 (age 58)
- Occupations: businessman and restaurateur
- Known for: founder of ASK Italian
- Parent: Phillip Kaye
- Relatives: Samuel Kaye (brother)

Adam Kaye (born September 1968) is a British businessman and restaurateur, and the co-founder with his brother Samuel of the ASK Italian casual dining chain. He is an executive director with Everyman Cinemas.

== Early life ==
Adam Kaye was born in September 1968, the son of businessman and restaurateur Phillip Kaye. He studied catering at a college in Westminster, London. The family name was originally Kropifko.

== Career ==
In 1993, Adam and Sam Kaye opened their first restaurant, a week after Sam finished at catering college. They bought the lease on a former Tootsies restaurant in Belsize Park, London, and converted it into a pizza pasta restaurant, inspired by Pizza Express. By 2002, they had 140 restaurants, 4,500 staff and turnover of £95 million.

In 2004, Adam and Sam Kaye sold their ASK Italian and Zizzi restaurants to Gondola Group, earning them almost £30 million. In 2006, the brothers launched the dim sum chain DimT.

Kaye was the founder of the pan-Asian Tasty chain. He has been an executive director of Everyman Media Group since 2015. He is on the board of directors for restaurant chains Ground Round, Tasty, Prezzo, Relish, Villandry Foodstore and several property groups.

== Personal life ==
Since 2002, Kaye has lived in a modern six-bedroom house on the edge of Hampstead Heath. In November 2015, Kaye was seeking to demolish the house and build a new one, citing "high living and maintenance costs" and an "inefficient choice of materials during the construction".
