= Woolworths Manchester fire =

1979 fire in a Woolworths store in Manchester, England

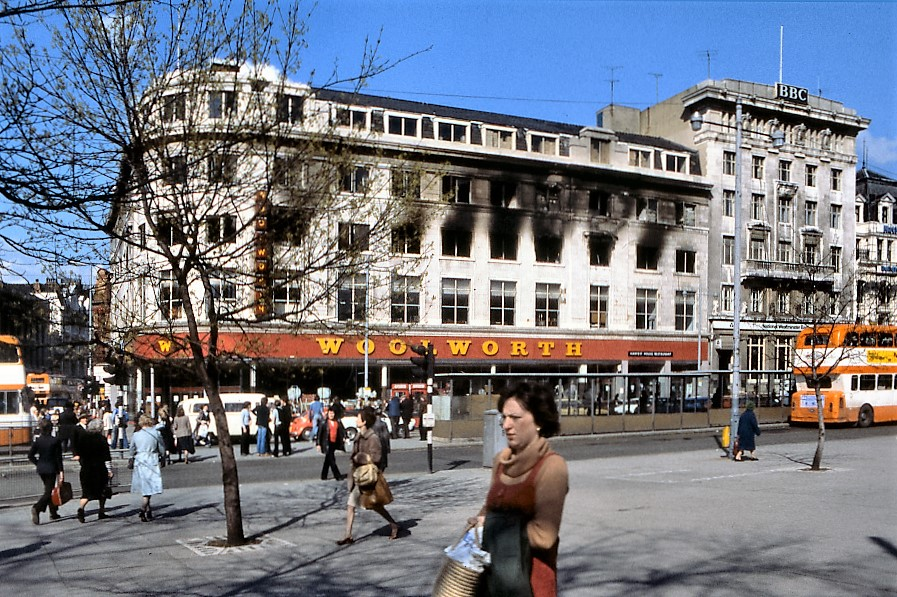
- Woolworths Manchester pictured a few days after the fire
- Date: 8 May 1979; 47 years ago
- Time: 13:27 BST
- Location: Manchester, England
- Type: Structure fire
- Cause: Discarded cigarette
- Deaths: 10
- Injuries: 47

The Woolworths Manchester fire occurred in 1979 at the Manchester Piccadilly department store branch of the British variety store retailer Woolworths in Manchester, England, causing 10 fatalities.

== Fire ==
A fire erupted at around 1:27pm on Tuesday 8 May 1979 at the Manchester shop opposite Piccadilly Gardens, said at the time to be the largest Woolworths in Europe, with six floors plus two basement levels. Of the 12 calls made to the fire service that day, none came from the shop itself, but the first one came from a taxi driver.

The fire, which started in the second floor furnishing department, killed nine shoppers and one member of staff, of whom three were found just six feet away from an exit with another three bodies nearby. The second floor was gutted by the fire, while the third floor suffered severe smoke damage; the ground, first, and second floors all received extensive water damage when the fire was extinguished.

It is believed that the fire was started by either a discarded cigarette or a damaged electrical cable, which had furniture stacked in front of it.

The fire brought graphic images into the public consciousness (including footage of female office staff trapped behind barred windows on the top floor) due to the shop's location next to the then studios of BBC Manchester (above the National Westminster Bank) and near to those of Granada Television, the offices of the Manchester Evening News, and the northern offices of several national newspapers.

== Victims ==
Ten people (nine customers and one Woolworths employee) died in the fire and a further 47 people were taken to hospital. The victims (and their ages in brackets) were:

- Michael Archer (31), customer
- Sarah Jane Bird (68), customer
- Dorothy Botham (86), customer
- Helena Gunn (69), customer
- Hazel Ann Heaton (29), customer
- Susan Heaton (32), customer
- Albert Edward McNally (70), customer
- Ernst Naylor (73), customer
- Patricia Jean Simmonds (59), customer
- Cyril Baldwin (68), Woolworths employee

== Aftermath ==
Due to the loss of life and devastation to the Manchester shop, the Fire Research Station conducted a number of tests to develop sprinkler systems that could handle a similar large department store fire.

The shop was re-opened, but closed in 1986. The site became an amusement arcade for many years, until the building owners evicted the tenants in favour of a building renovation to house a 157-room Travelodge hotel, a Morrisons convenience shop, and Zizzi and Nando's restaurants.

== Inquiry ==
An inquiry showed that, although the shop's fire precautions met all legal requirements, the spread of the fire and the high number of casualties were in part due to the absence of measures such as a fire sprinkler system to stop the spread of the fire from the furniture department, and the use of polyurethane foam in the furnishings, a material which is highly inflammable and highly toxic, but cheap and, at that time, legal in furniture. The inquiry also stated that the fire alarm did not set off in all areas of the building, that staff had not been trained on the procedure for calling the fire brigade, that some emergency doors had to be opened using a key from a break glass box beside the door (even though this type of fire had proven to be deadly in other recent incidents) and other fire exits were completely locked with no key available at all (a measure against shop lifting).

== Legacy ==
The findings of the inquiry would have consequences for later safety legislation, leading to modifications to the Fire Precautions Act. In 1988, following a campaign joined by Fire Officer Bob Graham, The Furniture and Furnishings (Fire) (Safety) Regulations came into effect, banning the use of polyurethane foam in home furnishings (a long-time concern of the fire service), forcing manufacturers to develop and make furniture fabrics, materials, fillings and covers from safer materials.

However, there is still no legal requirement for United Kingdom retailers to have a sprinkler system in place, with many preferring to focus on evacuation procedures rather than fire containment.

The disaster has become a significant object of study for academics interested in the behaviour of people in emergency situations, after research showed a number of customers (predominately in the public restaurant area) refused to leave despite the sounding of alarms, requests from staff, and even the smell and visibility of smoke; some even continued to queue at an abandoned check-out. The majority of those who perished were in this area.

== See also ==
- List of building or structure fires
