= Lennie Felix =

British jazz pianist (1920–1980)

Lennie Felix (16 August 1920 – 29 December 1980) was a British jazz pianist who worked in the bands of Nat Gonella, Harry Gold, and Sid Phillips, and enjoyed a 20-year association with trumpeter Freddy Randall.

Felix was born in Stamford Hill, London, England. He learned piano from the age of ten. His playing style reflected the influence of Fats Waller, Art Tatum and Earl Hines, but later drew on Keith Jarrett, Charlie Parker and Vladimir Horowitz. From the 1960s, Felix performed more and more as a solo pianist and appeared regularly at the PizzaExpress Jazz Club, where he also accompanied US visitors such as Bud Freeman and Buddy Tate.

Lennie Felix died in hospital after he was hit by a speeding car near to the 606 Club in Fulham.

== Discography ==
- Lennie Felix and Dick Wellstood (Felix recorded in London 1966 / Solo Art 2007)
