= Gondola Group =

Restaurant operator in the UK and Ireland

- Company type: Private
- Industry: Restaurant
- Owner: Cinven
- Website: gondolaholdings.com

Gondola Group was a chain restaurant operator in the United Kingdom and Ireland. It operated several casual dining brands:

- Byron Hamburgers, sold to Hutton Collins for £100 million in October 2013.
- Kettners, champagne bar and restaurant (one site in London), sold in 2013/2014.
- PizzaExpress, sold to the China based private equity firm Hony Capital in July 2014 for £900 million ($1.54 billion).
- ASK Italian and Zizzi, Italian food. Sold to Bridgepoint Capital in February 2015 for £250 million.
