= Leo Burdock =

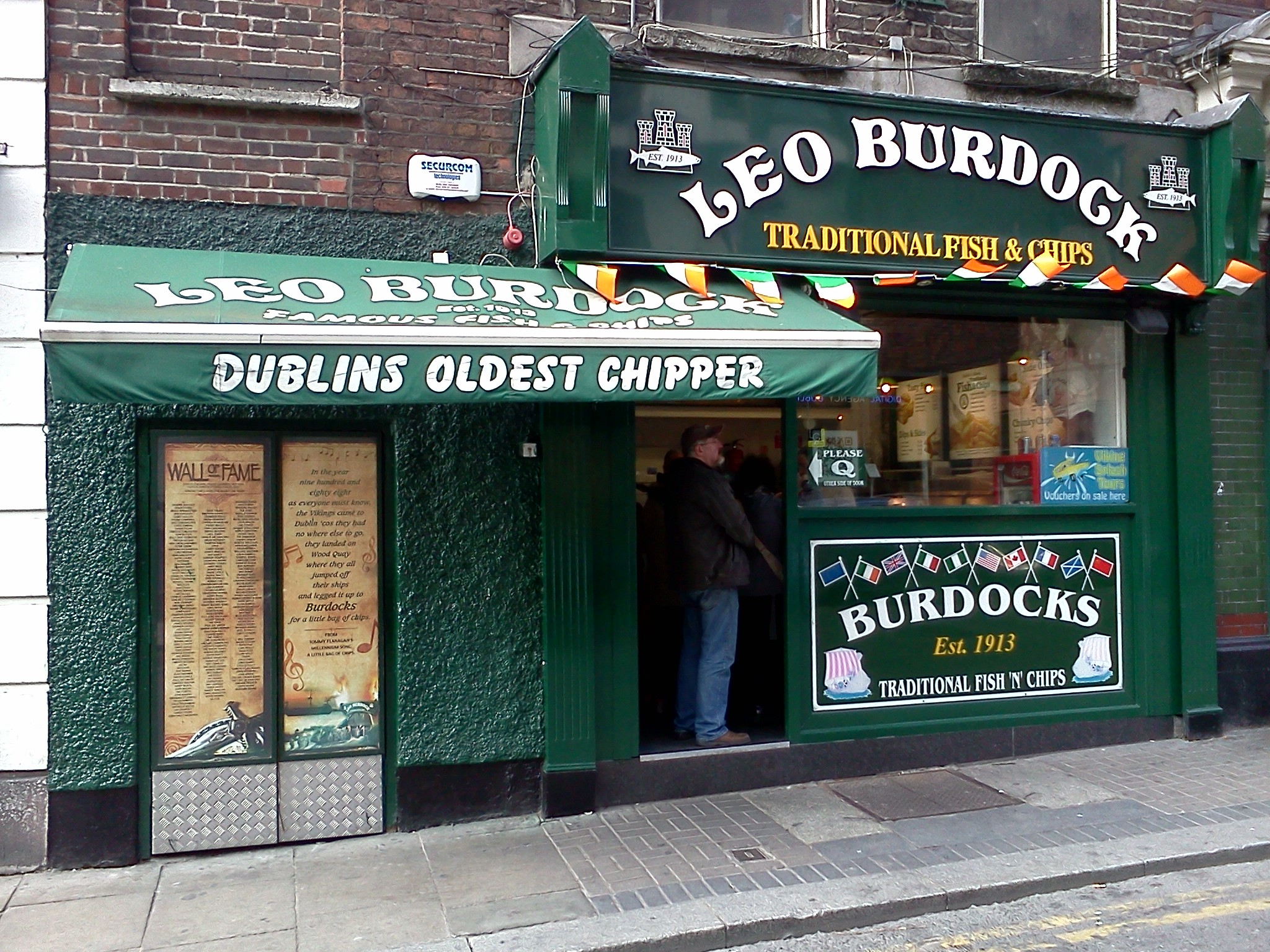
- Leo Burdock's original Dublin location since 1913
- Interactive map of Leo Burdock

Restaurant information
- Established: 1913; 113 years ago
- Location: Dublin, Ireland
- Coordinates: 53°20′35″N 6°16′12″W
- Website: www.leoburdock.com

Leo Burdocks, or Burdocks is a popular century-old Fish and chip shop and is Dublin's oldest chipper. It is based in the city and its original location in Werburgh Street, near Christ Church Cathedral, was the first. It has lasted through a revolution, a civil war, two world wars, Ireland's recession, boom, and bust. In the late 1990s, they expanded to a number of other locations for a second time. Besides locals, it is frequented by national and international celebrities.

== History ==
Burdocks was founded in 1913 by Bella Burdock in the Christchurch area of Dublin, Ireland. Together with her son Leo, after whom she named the business, they opened a number of Leo Burdocks Fish and Chip shops around Dublin.

A number of the Burdocks were involved in the Irish Republican Army. In 1941, a stash of revolvers, rifles, hand grenades and ammunition was discovered concealed in a pram at the Marrowbone Lane shop during a police search. Joseph Burdock took responsibility to ensure his father was not implicated. The lack of fuel and ingredients during the Second World War forced the closure of all but the original location.

Burdock's son, Brian, took over the business with his cousin Paddy Burdock after the death of his parents. The company was later sold to a franchise. The shop has opened more venues around Dublin, in Dundrum, Liffey Street, Howth, Ballyfermot, Rathmines, Phibsborough, Tallaght, and Temple Bar.

== Celebrity visitors ==
Since the 1990s, Burdocks has been documenting the famous visitors on their Burdock's Hall of Fame that hangs in each shop with such people as Naomi Campbell, Nicole Kidman, B. B. King, Ray Charles, Daniel Day-Lewis, Metallica, Snoop Dogg, Mick Jagger, Rod Stewart, Richard Harris, Conor McGregor, Bruce Springsteen (whom they refer to as a regular), and Dublin band U2.

== See also ==
- List of seafood restaurants
