= PizzaExpress Live Soho =

Jazz club in London, England

PizzaExpress Jazz Club
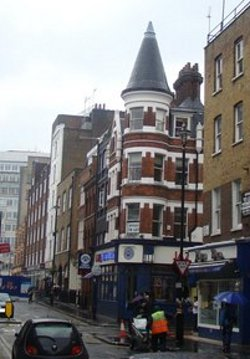
- View of the club from Dean Street
- Interactive map of PizzaExpress Jazz Club
- Location: Soho, London
- Coordinates: 51.514311°N 0.132687°W

Construction
- Opened: 1969

Website
- www.pizzaexpresslive.com/pizzaexpress-jazz-club-soho

PizzaExpress Live Soho, formerly known as PizzaExpress Jazz Club, is a jazz club in London, England. Based in Dean Street in Soho, it is situated in the basement of a PizzaExpress restaurant, and was opened by company founder Peter Boizot in 1969. It has played host to many jazz greats, such as Norah Jones, Amy Winehouse, and Jamie Cullum.

== History ==
=== Site and building ===
The site of the current building in Dean Street, Soho, was previously occupied by the Dispensary for Diseases of the Ear. Founded in 1816 by a Naval surgeon, John Harrison Curtis (1778–1860), the Dispensary for Diseases of the Ear – the first ear hospital in the UK if not in Europe – opened at 20 Carlisle Street under the patronage of the Prince Regent (later George IV). Shortly after this it moved to 10 Dean Street in Soho. By 1845 it was known as the Royal Ear Hospital. When larger premises were needed, it moved to 66 Firth Street in 1876, and the Dean Street building was subsequently demolished, and later (1904) the ear hospital moved to 42–43 Dean Street in purpose-built premises.

The current building was constructed in 1878.

=== Club ===
The club was founded in 1976 in the basement of the PizzaExpress restaurant at 10 Dean Street by Peter Boizot, who had founded the company in 1965.

Boizot sold the PizzaExpress company in 1993. The club has since been renamed PizzaExpress Live Soho.

== Performers ==
Early on, the featured UK jazz pianists such as Brian Lemon and Lennie Felix. In May 1975, the venue presented their first American jazz star, the saxophonist Bud Freeman, and other early visitors included Buddy Tate, Bob Wilber, Al Grey, Benny Carter, Ruby Braff, and Snub Mosley, who recorded an album Live At Pizza Express at the club in 1978. From 1980, the club had its own house band made up of top UK mainstream players including Digby Fairweather, Danny Moss and Tommy Whittle, known as the PizzaExpress All Stars.

Over the years the club has gone on to feature many other prominent jazz musicians. It has played host to Norah Jones, Amy Winehouse, Jamie Cullum, and Walter Smith III. Yank Lawson, Al Haig, John Dankworth, Red Norvo, Tal Farlow, Trummy Young, Jay McShann, Al Cohn, Kenny Baker, Dick Morrissey, Jimmy McPartland, and others appeared during the 1980s.

When Peter Boizot sold the PizzaExpress company in 1993, the jazz club survived the transition, and over the next two decades presented the first UK performances of Diana Krall, Norah Jones, Kurt Elling, Brad Mehldau, and e.s.t. Jamie Cullum performed at the venue with representatives from Universal and Sony sat on either side of the stage waiting to sign him. The Dean Street venue has also been associated with numerous festivals.

== Recognition ==
PizzaExpress Jazz Club has won many awards. It was named "Venue of the Year" in both 2015 and 2016 by London Lifestyle Awards.

== Related venues ==
Over the years, the PizzaExpress music policy expanded beyond Dean Street, with high-profile artists appearing at PizzaExpress Maidstone (Maidstone Music Room, on Earl Street, Maidstone) and Pizza on the Park. The Maidstone venue, which opened in 1989, closed permanently in 2020 owing to the deterioration of the building and prohibitive refurbishment costs. It had hosted Jamie Cullum, Gerry and the Pacemakers, Scouting For Girls, Mica Paris, Liane Carroll, Ian Shaw, Claire Martin, Shakatak, and many more.

Pizza on the Park had seating for 100, and performers included Lou Reed, Queen, and Hawkwind. The venue hosted jazz and cabaret acts from the mid-1980s until its closure on 18 June 2010, when the building was converted into a hotel.

PizzaExpress opened its new venue, dubbed "Live At The Pheasantry", or "PizzaExpress Live Chelsea" in The Pheasantry, a Grade II listed building at 152 King's Road in Chelsea, south west London. The first season began on 13 June 2010, with performances by Jessie Buckley, who had previously performed at Pizza in the Park.

As of May 2026, PizzaExpress Live Soho, PizzaExpress Live Chelsea, PizzaExpress Live Holborn, and Piano Lounge Covent Garden are also run by PizzaExpress Live.
