= Peter Boizot =

English restaurateur

Peter Boizot MBE
- Born: Peter Boizot; 16 November 1929; Peterborough, England
- Died: 5 December 2018 (aged 89); Peterborough, England
- Known for: Founder of PizzaExpress
- Political party: Liberal Democrats

Peter James Boizot MBE (/ˈbɔɪzoʊ/; 16 November 1929 – 5 December 2018) was an English entrepreneur, restaurateur, politician, art collector and philanthropist. He is best known as the founder of PizzaExpress.

== Early years ==
The son of Gaston and Susannah Boizot, he was born, educated and lived in Peterborough, England. In his childhood he stopped eating meat, and he remained a vegetarian.

=== Education ===
Boizot attended The King's School, Peterborough where he was head boy and sang in the choir of Peterborough Cathedral. In 1953, Boizot earned an Honours Degree in History at St Catharine's College, Cambridge. Boizot received an Honorary Degree at Loughborough University in 2000 in recognition of his successful business acumen and career, and his contributions to Peterborough.

== Business Career: PizzaExpress ==
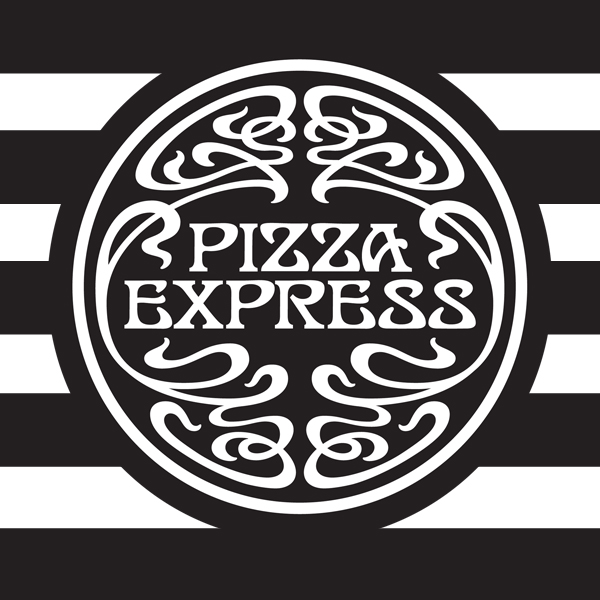
PizzaExpress logo

Boizot founded PizzaExpress in 1965, after having worked in Europe for ten years and noticing that he was unable to eat an authentic pizza slice in London. Boizot floated PizzaExpress on the London Stock Exchange in 1993 but remained president.

His first restaurant opened in Wardour Street, Soho, London, to much acclaim, with a second PizzaExpress opening in 1967. He was also the first to import Peroni into the UK. Boizot's empire grew quickly because of its authentic Italian taste and unique artistic approach.

== Personal life ==
Boizot was locally renowned as 'Mr Peterborough' because of the work and funds that he put back into his hometown of Peterborough. He purchased and then modernised his favourite local haunt, the Great Northern Hotel in 1993. In 1997 he bought the ailing Peterborough United Football Club and invested £5 million into its resurrection. Boizot acquired the former Odeon cinema building in 1996 and transformed it into a multi-purpose entertainment venue complete with theatre, concert and conference rooms.

Boizot was an avid jazz fan. He opened his first jazz club, the PizzaExpress Jazz Club, in Soho in 1969, whilst founding the Soho Jazz Festival in 1986. He then opened other PizzaExpress Jazz Clubs across the UK. These jazz clubs have played host to greats such as Ella Fitzgerald, Jamie Cullum, Sting, Amy Winehouse and Norah Jones.

Boizot began collecting art from an early age and incorporated art into many of his ventures. At PizzaExpress and the jazz clubs, he commissioned pop artists such as Sir Peter Blake, Eduardo Paolozzi and Enzo Apicella to fill the walls of the establishments. In 2004, St Catharine's College in Cambridge presented Boizot with a portrait by artist Suresh Patel in recognition of his contribution to the university. In 2011, Boizot sold the majority of his art collection near his hometown of Peterborough. He worked with restaurant designer Enzo Apicella, who has been credited with being the visual architect of PizzaExpress.

Boizot was an active supporter of the Liberal Party. He twice stood as the Liberal candidate for Peterborough at the general elections of February and October 1974.

At the age of 84, Boizot turned his life story into the 2014 autobiography Mr Pizza and All That Jazz. The work, which was written with journalist Matthew Reville.

== Philanthropy ==
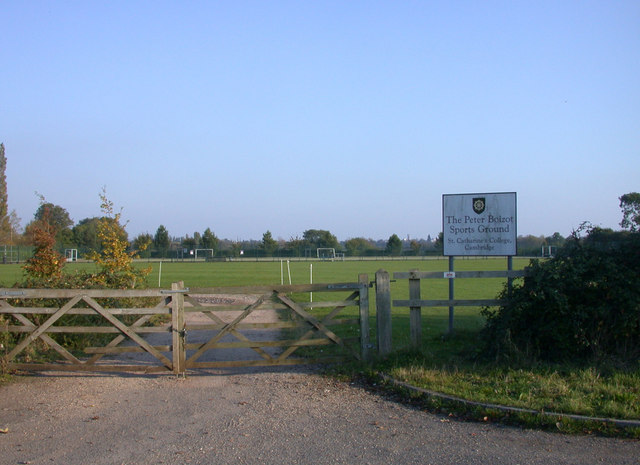
Peter Boizot Sports Ground, Cambridge

In 1977, Boizot created the Veneziana pizza in his PizzaExpress restaurant to gain attention to and raise funds for Venice in Peril. 5p from each Veneziana pizza sold would be donated to the charity, a charity set up to raise funds to restore and conserve works of art and architecture in Venice.

This charity initiative still exists at all PizzaExpress restaurants, but the amount donated has increased to 25p from each pizza. Boizot's efforts have raised over £2,000,000 to date. For his Venice in Peril charity efforts, in 1996, Boizot was appointed a Knight Commander of the Order of Merit of the Italian Republic.

He was a benefactor of St Catharine's College and the Peter Boizot Sports Ground on Grantchester Road, Cambridge, was named in his honour.

Boizot was awarded the MBE "for political and public service" in the 1986 Birthday Honours.

== Death ==
Boizot died on 5 December 2018 at the age of 89. He was survived by his sister, Clementine Allen.
