= Garfunkel's (restaurant) =

British restaurant chain

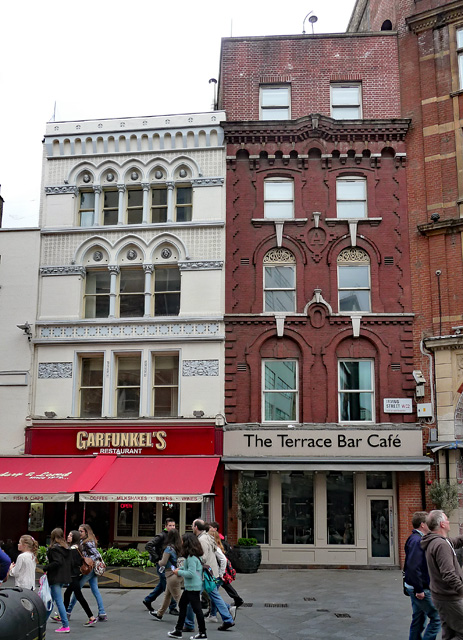
- Garfunkel's in Irving Street, London, 2014

Restaurant information
- Established: 1979
- Closed: June 3, 2020
- Previous owner: Phillip Kaye
- Location: London

Garfunkel's was a small chain of restaurants in London and other locations including Bath. It was founded in 1979 by Phillip Kaye, and was part of the Restaurant Group.

On 3 June 2020, during the COVID-19 pandemic in the United Kingdom, Restaurant Group told employees a "large number" of its Garfunkel's outlets would not reopen after lockdown.

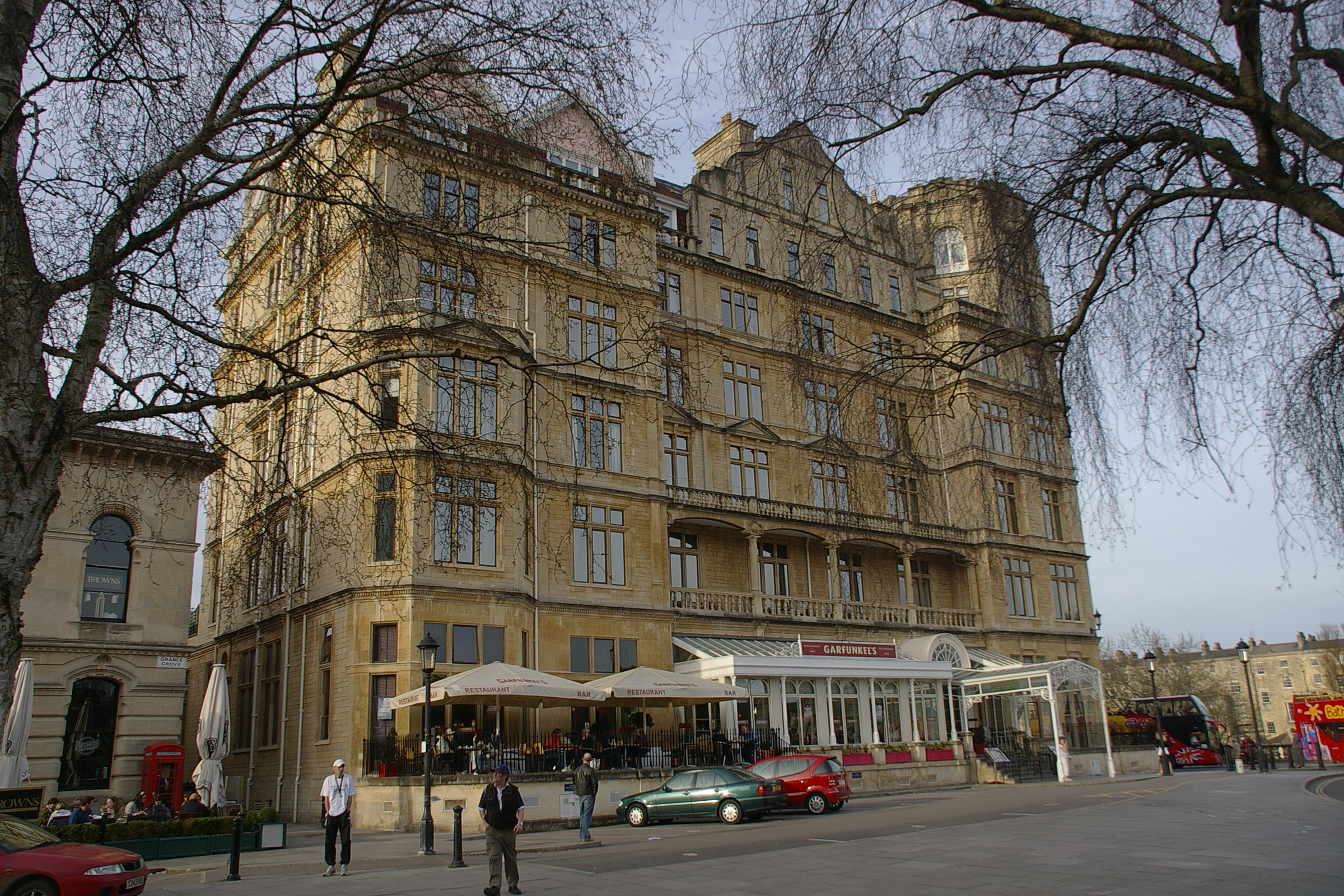
Garfunkel's at the Empire Hotel, Bath, 2009

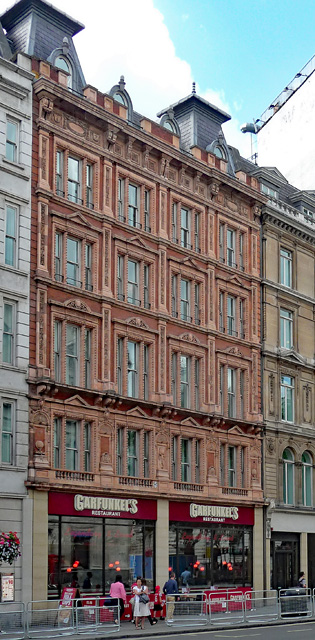
Garfunkel's on Cockspur Street, London, 2013
