= Hutton Collins =

British private equity firm

Hutton Collins Partners
- Type: Private equity
- Industry: Private equity
- Founded: 2002
- Founders: Graham Hutton; Matthew Collins
- Defunct: 2024
- Fate: Dissolved
- Headquarters: London, United Kingdom
- Website: www.huttoncollins.com

Hutton Collins Partners was a London-based private equity firm founded in 2002 by Graham Hutton and Matthew Collins. The firm invested private capital in UK middle-market businesses before it was officially dissolved in 2024, having successfully sold its remaining 3 investments.

The generalist investor aimed at mid-size Western European, and especially Spanish, French and Italian businesses. Their investments span from €35 to €100 million in businesses valued between €100 and €500 million. They focused on business and financial services, leisure and healthcare.

== Investments ==
In July 2007, Hutton Collins acquired Healthcare at Home, today known as Sciensus, from Apax Partners, with the management team owning the majority stake.

In January 2011, Hutton Collins, Goldman Sachs and Bayside Capital supported Caffè Nero with £99m in refinancing and their anticipated expansion. Two months later, Hutton Collins, with Duke Street Capital, acquired noodle restaurant chain Wagamama for £215 million from Lion Capital.

The next January, Hutton Collins invested £32million in Hunter Boot Ltd supporting the buy-out by majority stakeholder Searchlight Capital. In July 2012, Hutton Collins, with LGV Capital, acquired bar-chain owner Novus Leisure.

In October 2013, Hutton Collins bought a stake in the Byron Hamburgers chain, purchased for £100 million from Gondola Group.

Hutton Collins sold majority stake in Byron Hamburgers to Three Hills Capital Partners, retaining a minority stake, in 2017. In December 2018, Hutton Collins and Duke Street Capital, sold noodle restaurant chain Wagamama to The Restaurant Group, with Wagamama's value being estimated at £559 million.
