= Enzo Apicella =

Italian cartoonist (1922–2018)

Vincenzo "Enzo" Apicella
- Born: 26 June 1922; Naples, Italy
- Died: 31 October 2018 (aged 96)
- Education: Autodidact
- Known for: Artist, cartoonist, designer, restaurateur
- Spouse: Sophie Jegado

Vincenzo "Enzo" Apicella, FCSD (26 June 1922 – 31 October 2018) was an Italian London-based artist, cartoonist, designer, and restaurateur.

== Life and work ==
Enzo Apicella was born in Naples, Italy on 26 June 1922. Having served in the Italian Air Force during World War II] he went on to study at film school in Rome. Soon after, he became a freelance designer working in illustration and print journalism before co-founding Melodramma, an opera magazine, in Venice in 1953.

When the magazine ceased publication, he came to England in 1954 and began designing posters and sets for television, as well as producing cartoon films. A self-taught cartoonist, his cartoons were published in The Observer, The Guardian, Punch, The Economist, Private Eye, Harpers & Queen, and Liberazione.

In 1974 Apicella worked with artists John & Rosalind on the LP album A Night at Factotum. He produced the sleeve design and caricatures. He was not only a restaurant designer and restaurateur, but is acclaimed as one of the protagonists of the Sixties – an enigmatic maverick, described by Vogue's Bevis Hillier as "One of the creators of the Swinging Sixties" who profoundly influenced the face of London's restaurant scene. Known for going that much further than any of his contemporaries, Apicella understood that the pop uprising demanded more eating out than in.

He worked as an interior designer for over 150 restaurants, including 70 for Peter Boizot's Pizza Express. He was co-owner of Club dell'Arethusa, Meridiana, Factotum, Apicella '81 and Condotti.

Apicella worked with many London restaurateurs including Peter Langan, Peter Boizot, Michael Chow, Alvaro Maccioni, Sir Terence Conran, and Mario Cassandro.

Apicella was a member of the Chartered Society of Designers and is listed in the Dictionary of British cartoonists and caricaturists.

== Publications ==
- 1967 Non Parlare Baciami
- 1976 The Pizza Express Cookbook ISBN 0241891965
- 1978 The Recipes That Made a Million ISBN 0-85613-489-9
- 1983 Memorie di Uno Smemorato
- 1985 Jonathan Routh's Initial good loo guide: Where to 'go' in London. London: Banyan, 1987. ISBN 0-7119-1282-3. Text by Jonathan Routh.
- 1987 The Harpers & Queen Guide to London's 100 Best Restaurants ISBN 1-85203-018-6
- 1988 Don't Talk, Kiss ISBN 0-9506402-3-9
- 1993 Mouthfool: A Collection of Culinary Cartoons ISBN 0-948817-87-9
- 2003 Apicella Versus the United States of America ISBN 88-8112-430-0
- 2007 God Bless America ISBN 978-88-87826-45-6
