= Brody Sweeney =

Irish businessman

Brody Sweeney is an Irish businessman, known for founding O'Briens Irish Sandwich Bars and the food delivery brand Camile Thai Kitchen.

== Career ==
In 1981, Sweeney founded Prontaprint in Ireland, a printing company. He sold the company back to the British parent in 1988. Sweeney is known for founding O'Briens Irish Sandwich Bars in 1988. The company went into liquidation in October 2009. He has written two business guides, Making Bread and "Small to Tall" - How to grow your business from its entrepreneurial roots.

Sweeney unsuccessfully ran as a Fine Gael candidate for Dublin North-East in the 2007 general election. Sweeney came sixth of eight candidates, with 10.1% of first preference votes.

He founded a Thai takeaway business, Camile Thai Kitchen, in 2010. As of 2021, 45 Camile Thai branches were franchised or operating across Ireland and the United Kingdom.

In 2011 and 2015, Sweeney was appointed to the board of Bord Bia, the state agency responsible for promoting sales of Irish food.
