= Boojum (restaurant) =

Mexican-style fast food chain in the UK and Ireland

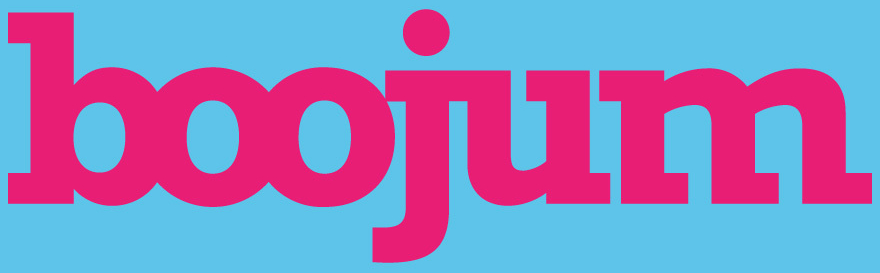
- Industry: Restaurants
- Founded: 2007; 19 years ago in Belfast, Northern Ireland
- Founders: John Blisard; Karen Blisard
- Areas served: Ireland; Northern Ireland; England
- Key people: David Maxwell; (managing director)
- Products: Burrito; taco; fajita
- Owner: Independent (2007-15); Andy Maxwell (2015–23); David Maxwell (2015–23); Azzurri Central Limited (2023–present)
- Number of employees: 444
- Website: www.boojummex.com

Boojum is a British-owned chain of Mexican fast-food restaurants. Founded in Belfast, Northern Ireland in 2007 by John and Karen Blisard, they operate 18 outlets throughout the rest of United Kingdom and Ireland, including a "Turbo Boojum" outlet in Dublin. On 10 April 2024, Boojum opened their first store outside of the island of Ireland, in Leeds, England.

== Foundation ==
Boojum was founded in 2007 by John Blisard and his wife Karen, who met in Philadelphia. The chain was bought in 2015 by former Ulster Rugby player Andy Maxwell and his brother David, a 2018 EY Entrepreneur of the Year finalist. The first Boojum opened up as a small outlet in 2007 on Botanic Avenue, in Belfast

In June 2023, the company was bought by Azzurri Restaurants Ltd, the owner of the Zizzi and ASK Italian chains.

== Products ==
As well as burritos, tacos, fajitas and burrito bowls, Boojum also produced home barbecue kits, and rice-scented candles.

In 2021, Boojum's managing director David Maxwell criticised supermarket chain Morrisons for apparently imitating Boojum's branding on their Mexican ready meal range. In 2017, Boojum's burrito was the second most commonly ordered item of food on Deliveroo in the world. In 2018, their burrito was the fourth most commonly ordered item of food on Deliveroo in the world.

== Advertising ==
In 2019, an advertisement for Boojum featuring a depiction of Jesus was criticised by a spokesperson from the Presbyterian Church in Ireland, as well as DUP councillor Mark Baxter.

In 2022, the chain apologised after a photo of two tip jars depicting Johnny Depp and Amber Heard emerged on social media.
