= Pennies (digital charity box) =

Charitable organization

- Founded: November 6, 2007
- VAT ID no.: 6418982 (company limited by guarantee)
- Registration no.: 1122489 (UK); 20106331 (Republic of Ireland)
- Purpose: Micro-donations; Fintech
- Region served: United Kingdom; Republic of Ireland
- Key people: Alison Hutchinson CBE (CEO); Sir Martyn Lewis CBE (Ambassador); Robert Leitão (Chair of Trustees)
- Revenue: £5.6 million (2018)
- Employees: 14
- Volunteers: 3
- Website: pennies.org.uk

Pennies is a registered charity in the United Kingdom and Republic of Ireland. Its purpose is to encourage and facilitate charitable giving, and to raise funds for a variety of UK registered charities through micro-donations made by customers at the point of sale (a form of 'digital charity box').

The Daily Telegraph has described Pennies' digital charity box as "a new channel for an old habit" that has adapted the shop counter charity box for the internet and card using generation.

== Operation of the digital charity box ==
One of Pennies' main charitable objects is to provide technology and infrastructure designed to make it easier to give to charity. Pennies achieves this is through its point of sale donation option, or 'digital charity box'. Businesses who wish to enable Pennies' digital charity box can partner with the charity and Pennies will work with the retailer's payment service provider (PSP) to enable to donation option.

Shoppers are privately invited to donate small amounts (typically between 1p–99p) to charity when they pay for goods and services by card or digital wallet in participating retailers. All the money raised through Pennies goes to charity. Pennies’ partner retailers nominate the charity or charities to benefit from donations. In January 2013, just over two years after launch, people had donated 4 million times through Pennies, raising £1,000,000 for charity. As of September 2015, over 20 million consumer donations had been made through the digital charity box.

Retailers that have customers who pay for goods and services by card can easily implement Pennies' digital charity box option on their payment system in stores, or in their online stores or mobile apps. Sales staff are not involved in donations made at the point of sale in stores; when the customer is ready to pay for goods or services, the PIN pad prompts the customer with the option to round up or top up their purchase and add a donation to the payment.

Pennies launched online in November 2010 with Domino’s Pizza and has since partnered many other national, regional and local companies, both in-store, online and in-app. In its first year, Pennies received over one million donations, totalling £250,000, rising to £300,000 for the calendar year 2011.

Pennies is available in store with a range of retailers, including The Entertainer, Zizzi Restaurants, The Fragrance Shop, Greene King, Whitbread, H. Samuel and Ernest Jones (part of Signet Jewelers), and petrol forecourt operators Rontec and Motor Fuel Group (MFG). It is available online with Domino’s Pizza, Travelodge, Holland & Barrett and Sofology, among many others.

By August 2020, 100 million donations had been made via Pennies' digital charity box, raising a total of £25,000,000 for charity.

== Recognition ==
In June 2011, Pennies won an award in the 'fundraising' category of the Technology4Good awards (T4G). It was also nominated by Third Sector magazine in its Britain’s Most Admired Charities 2011 awards in the Most Innovative Charity category. In late 2012, Pennies won the 'Best Not for Profit IT Project' in IT Industry Awards held by BCS, the Chartered Institute for IT and Computing magazine.

In May 2013, Pennies was named as a finalist in the first Google Global Impact Challenge UK, which recognises innovative non-profits using technology for social good.

In 2019, Pennies was named one of The Most Influential Financial Technology Companies in 2019 by Financial Technologist magazine, the only charity to make the list.

Pennies has also received messages of support from prominent figures in the retail and technology industry. Joanna Shields, former Vice President of Facebook, described Pennies as "a simple idea that removes friction from giving", and UK Digital Champion Martha Lane Fox has said that Pennies' "simple yet clever technology can make a real difference when the charitable sector needs it most".

Public figures such as Prince Harry, Cheryl Cole, Jason Donovan, Gary Barlow and Jeremy Irons have also supported Pennies.

== The Pennies Foundation ==
Pennies is the working name of The Pennies Foundation. The Pennies Foundation is a charity registered with the Charity Commission for England and Wales and a company limited by guarantee registered in England.

The November 2010 annual accounts showed that philanthropists and foundations had contributed over £1 million to The Pennies Foundation in cash and in kind as start-up gifts, to establish the charity's infrastructure and cover its running costs in the early years. Point-of-sale donations were accounted for separately as "'pennies' donations received" and set aside as "designated funds", to be passed on without deduction. However, the Foundation acknowledged in 2011 that, in order to be sustainable in the long term, it will become necessary to start retaining a small percentage of each donation.
