= UFINET =

Telecommunications company

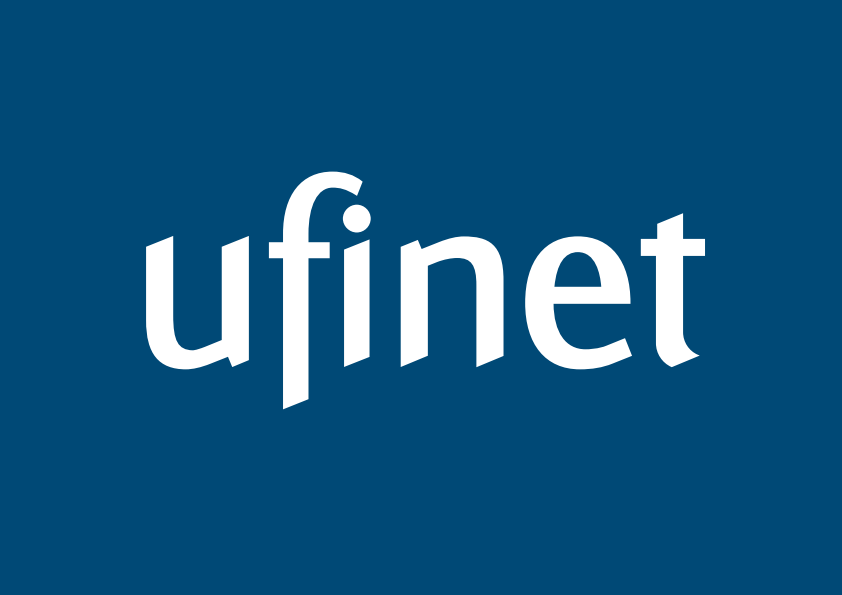
>UFINET

UFINET is a multinational telecommunications company headquartered in Madrid, Spain. It operates a Tier 2 network.

== History ==
UFINET is a neutral, carrier of carriers telecom company, meaning it focuses on B2B sales to enterprise customers, Tier 3 ISPs including leases of FTTH optical distribution networks, dark fiber, optical line terminals and optical network terminals, and internet transit for Tier 2 ISPs. It was created by Unión Fenosa (formerly known as Unión Fenosa Redes de Telecomunicación) in 1998. In 2009, it merged with Desarrollo de Cable, which belonged to the company Gas Natural, rebranding the merged entity as Gas Natural Fenosa Telecomunicaciones (GNF Telecom). In 2014, Cinven, an the UK-based private equity fund, acquired GNFT. The acquisition valued the company at €510 million. Since then, the company has traded as UFINET. In June 2018, ENEL acquired 21% of the company, while Cinven kept the remaining 79% In May 2026, Cinven hired advisors to explore a potential sale of Ufinet.

== Business areas ==
UFINET provides telecommunication services through more than 70,000km of fiber optic network. Among the services provided are Fiber optic, data transmission, Internet service provider, co-location center, Ethernet (E-Line, E-Access, E-LAN, E-Tree), PDH/SDH7/SONET, Dark Fiber, Internet (DIA, SOHO), VSAT (Satellite services), FTTH (Fiber to the Home), Towering, Layer 3 services, Direct cloud connectivity and other services (CPE Lease, Remote Hands, etc.). UFINET is a MEF Carrier Ethernet 3.0 (CE 3.0) certified for E-LINE, E-LAN, E-TREE and E-ACCESS capacity services.

== Countries covered ==
UFINET currently has a presence in Mexico, Guatemala, Honduras, El Salvador, Nicaragua, Costa Rica, Panamá, Colombia, Ecuador, Peru, Brazil, Paraguay, Argentina and Chile. It also uses the facilities of data center providers such as CoreSite, providing network access points (NAP) in the Americas, New York, Los Angeles and Dominican Republic.
