= Novus Leisure =

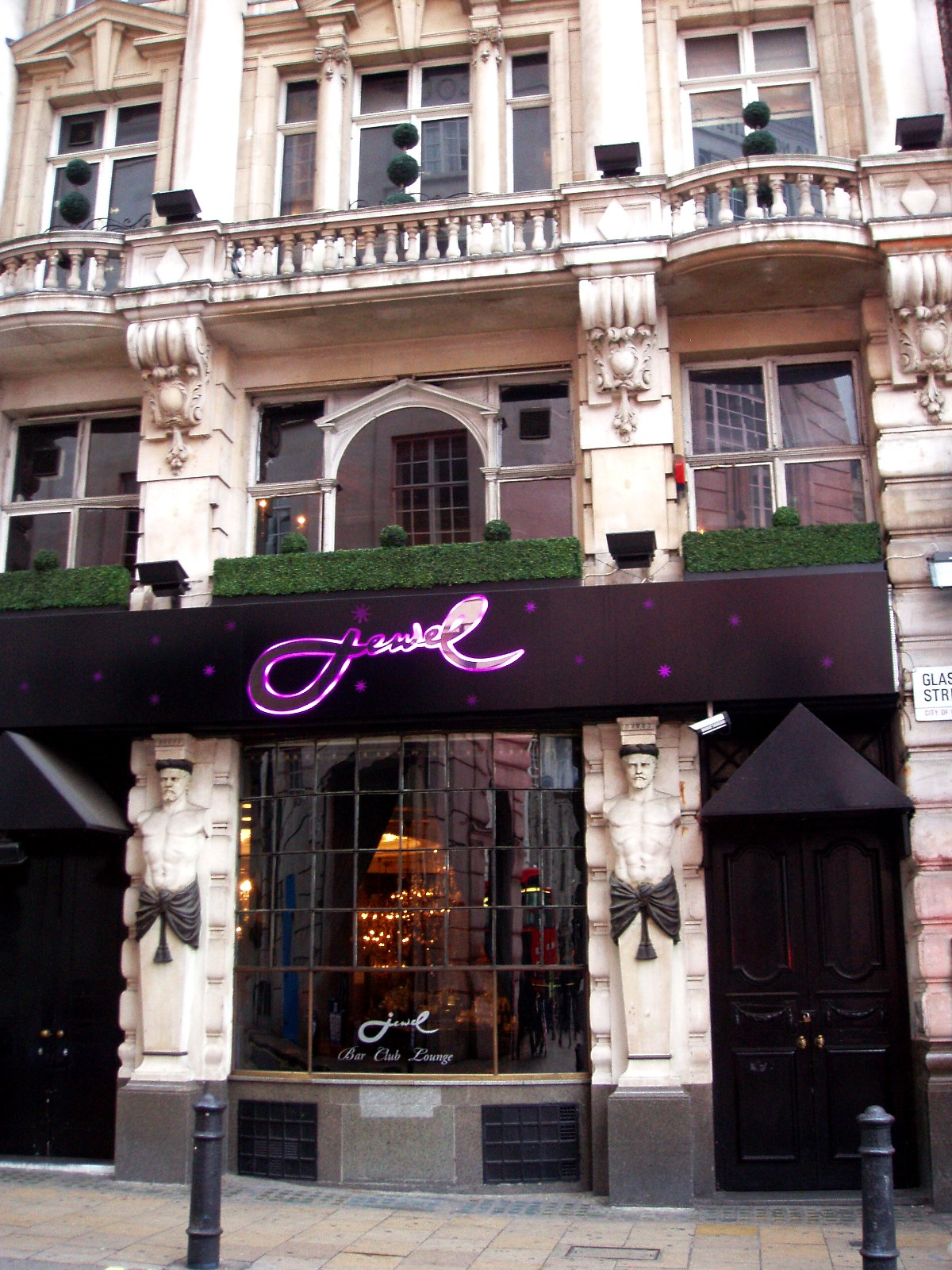
- Jewel, one of Novus Leisure's bars in central London
- Headquarters: United Kingdom
- Number of locations: 41 bars and nightclubs (2018)
- Key people: Toby Smith (chief executive)
- Services: Operates bars and nightclubs
- Parent: HayFin Capital Management
- Subsidiaries: Tiger Tiger

Novus Leisure (also A3D2 Ltd) is a British company which operates 41 bars and nightclubs in the United Kingdom. Toby Smith has been in charge of the company since 2015. Their operations include two Tiger Tiger nightclubs, and several venues in the City and West End areas of London.

== Ownership history ==
Having been listed on the London Stock Exchange in 2005 under the name Urbium, the company was taken private in a £115 million buyout. Four years later, Barclays and Royal Bank of Scotland took control from Cognetas (now Motion Equity Partners) in a debt-for-equity deal, followed by LGV Capital and Hutton Collins' £100m purchase in 2012. Presently, the company is owned by HayFin Capital Management, who had provided the debt in 2012 and seized control in 2015. Novus purchased three Rocket Restaurants sites for an undisclosed sum in 2017.

HayFin put Novus up for sale in 2018, and over the next year Stonegate Pub Company acquired Be At One, Fever Bars and 21 London sites.
