= Patrick Leo Burdock =

Irish republican (1900-1966)

- Born: 20 May 1900; Iveagh Trust Buildings, Dublin, Ireland
- Died: 23 September 1966 (aged 66)
- Occupation: businessman

Patrick Leo Burdock (20 May 1900 – 23 September 1966) was an Irish fish and chip shop proprietor and republican.

== Early life ==
Patrick Leo Burdock was born on 20 May 1900 at 219 Iveagh Trust Buildings, Dublin. His parents were Margaret "Bella" (née Bracken) (1878–1954) and Patrick Joseph Burdock (1873–1948). His father was a general labourer, working at a variety of jobs, and his mother was a shop assistant and packer. By the 1930s, his father described himself as a merchant. Burdock was the second of 8 children. It is thought he attended the local St Bride's National School.

Burdock's mother opened a fish and chip shop in Inchicore, and named it after her eldest son, Leo Burdock. From a young age, Leo worked at the family business, collecting fish and potatoes from markets in the city on his horse and cart. The family opened the second shop close to their home on Werburgh Street, expanding the business further with 5 more shops over the next 20 years. Due to food shortages in the 1940s, all the other shops closed bar the Werburgh Street shop.

== Republicanism ==
In November 1920, Burdock joined the Dublin Brigade of the Irish Republican Army (IRA), and was a private in the C. Company III Battalion. He was described as "very efficient volunteer … always ready for action", patrolling the south inner city. He was involved in ambushes of Black and Tan lorries at a number of locations in April and May 1920, with an exchange of gunfire. Burdock fought in the Irish Civil War on the anti-treaty side, and was part of two attacks on the intelligence department of the Free State Army at Oriel House, Westland Row in September 1922. He was later arrested and spent a short time at Mountjoy Prison. He remained an active member of the republican movement after the creation of the Irish Free State in 1922. Due to his involvement with the transport workers strike against the Dublin United Tramway Company in March 1935, he was imprisoned at Curragh military prison for 6 months. Two of his brothers, James and Joseph, were arrested for possession of arms and ammunition in 1934 and 1941 respectively.

Burdock was released from prison, and met Annie Doyle from Griffith Terrace, in The Liberties. They married on 13 September 1937 at St Catherine's church, Meath Street. The couple moved to Griffith Terrace, where Burdock lived for the rest of his life. He was awarded a military pension in 1946, which helped the family through the shop closures and financial instability of the 1940s. The couple had one child, Brian.

== Later life ==
Despite increased competition from the 1950s onwards from other "chippers", the shop at Werburgh Street continued successfully. His mother died in 1954 from cancer, and Burdock continued to run the family shop until his death from cancer on 23 September 1966. He was buried at Mount Jerome Cemetery with full military honours from the "old IRA".
