= Everyman Cinemas =

Cinema chain in the United Kingdom

Everyman Media Group plc

- Type: Public Limited Company
- Traded as: AIM: EMAN
- Industry: Entertainment
- Genre: Cinema, Films, Movies, Restaurant, Bar
- Founded: 2000 (with the purchase of the original 1933 Everyman Cinema)
- Headquarters: London, England
- Number of locations: 49 cinemas
- Area served: United Kingdom
- Key people: Farah Golant (CEO); Adam Kaye (Executive Director); Sheree Manning (CFO)
- Services: Box Office Cinema, Food and Drink
- Owner: Everyman Media Group plc
- Website: www.everymancinema.com

Everyman Media Group plc (known as Everyman Cinemas) is a cinema company based in London, England.

== History ==
The company was founded in 2000, when entrepreneur Daniel Broch bought the original Everyman Cinema in Hampstead, London, which dated to 1933, which before then was a theatre. Broch led the growth of the company with the acquisition in 2008 of Screen Cinemas to add more locations. This coincided with Broch selling a majority stake in the enlarged company, though he remains a shareholder.

The group is extending its operating area and has opened cinemas in northern England. The first of these opened in Leeds in April 2013 as part of the Trinity Leeds development in the city centre and a second opened within The Mailbox in Birmingham on 27 February 2015. A further cinema opened in Harrogate in September 2016. In April 2015, the company reached an agreement to buy four cinemas from its larger rival Odeon for £7.1 million.

In August 2013, The Guardian reported that the entire non-management staff of about 100 was employed on zero-hour contracts, earning just above the minimum wage, and without any guaranteed set hours each week.

== Operations ==
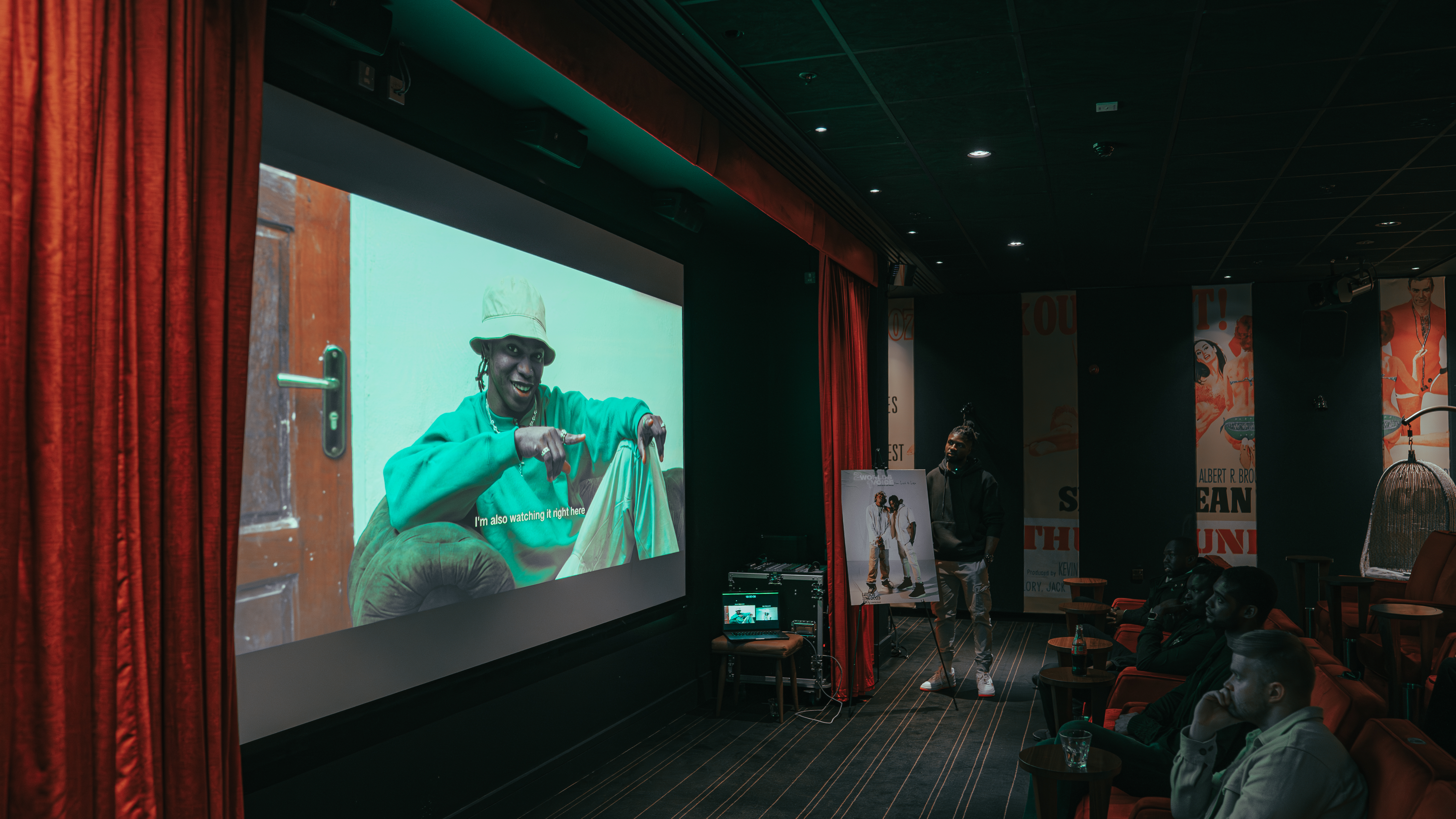
2 worlds 1 voice premier - Ntantu - Leeds 2023

Everyman Cinemas offer a programme of films and special events, including the Metropolitan Opera from New York and the National Theatre (in selected cinemas), live Q&As, film festivals and seasons. The venues each feature a licensed bar, food, digital projection and surround sound technology.

== Impact of the COVID-19 pandemic ==
In March 2020, Everyman Cinemas and all other cinemas in the UK closed indefinitely due to a national lockdown in response to the COVID-19 pandemic. They started a phased reopening in July 2020.
