= Automated Maritime Telecommunications System =

Automated Maritime Telecommunications System (AMTS) is a commercial mobile radio service used within the United States. It operates within the VHF frequency range, just above the North American Band III television range, and offers both voice and data communications to maritime customers. The system is operated by a network of private carriers across the country, with coverage primarily including coastal and inland waterways.

== History ==
In 1981, the FCC proposed the Inland Waterways Communication System (IWCS), a commercial maritime radio service with the proposed purpose of expanding private maritime communication and that was to operate from 216 to 220 MHz. Earlier reports had studied the feasibility of using this frequency band, but warned of the high probability of adjacent-channel interference with TV channel 13. However, by the early 1980s, it had been estimated that radio tuner technology had advanced to the point that such interference could be minimized.

Final approval for auctioning of AMTS spectrum did not come until almost two decades later with the approval of the Balanced Budget Act of 1997, which required that the FCC auction licenses for such spectrum.

== Technical specifications ==
Maximum base station transmit power: 1,000 watts ERP

Maximum mobile unit transmit power: 18 watts ERP

Block	Frequency Band (uplink)	Frequency Band (downlink)	Block Bandwidth	Channels	Channel Bandwidth (per duplex)	Num. of Licenses
A	217.5 – 218.0 MHz	219.5 – 220.0 MHz	500 kHz × 2	20	25 kHz	9
B	217.0 – 217.5 MHz	219.0 – 219.5 MHz	500 kHz × 2	20	25 kHz	1

The AMTS spectrum may be used in Land Mobile Radio Systems subject to the above-mentioned regulations and TV interference considerations. For example, under the conditions of the service, AMTS spectrum could be used in land-locked (e.g.) Denver to carry mobile radio traffic.

Bands bought at auction having Geographic licenses (use inside a defined region, vs. Site Licenses that are only for a point) may be divided into frequency channels per the owner or licensee's discretion. Thus, if the user chooses to use Narrow Band spacings, the number of channels per block is 500 kHz / 12.5 kHz= 40 channels; with Very Narrow Band spacings, the number of channels per block is 500 kHz / 6.25 kHz = 80 channels. Using technology that can support narrower bandwidths in general allows more efficient use of the licensed block. Note that spectra do not have to be purchased in 500 kHz. purchasing (e.g.) 375 kHz is allowed under FCC rules, although the seller may not be amenable to such a proposal.

== Restrictions ==
The AMTS is unique to U.S. waters, having no compatible counterpart in Canada or Mexico. Use is limited to a maximum of 12 nautical miles off the US coast. Interference outside US territorial waters is possible.

When used within 105 miles (169 kilometers) of a TV transmitter operating on channel 13 or within 80 miles (129 kilometers) of a TV transmitter operating on channel 10, the FCC requires a plan to limit interference of such TV signals by both base stations and mobile units. As such, maximum transmit power may be below 1,000 watts ERP.

Lastly, AMTS systems may not interfere with the SPASUR radar system which operates on the adjacent 216.88-217.08 MHz band.
