= ASK Italian =

British casual dining restaurant chain

ASK Italian Restaurants Limited

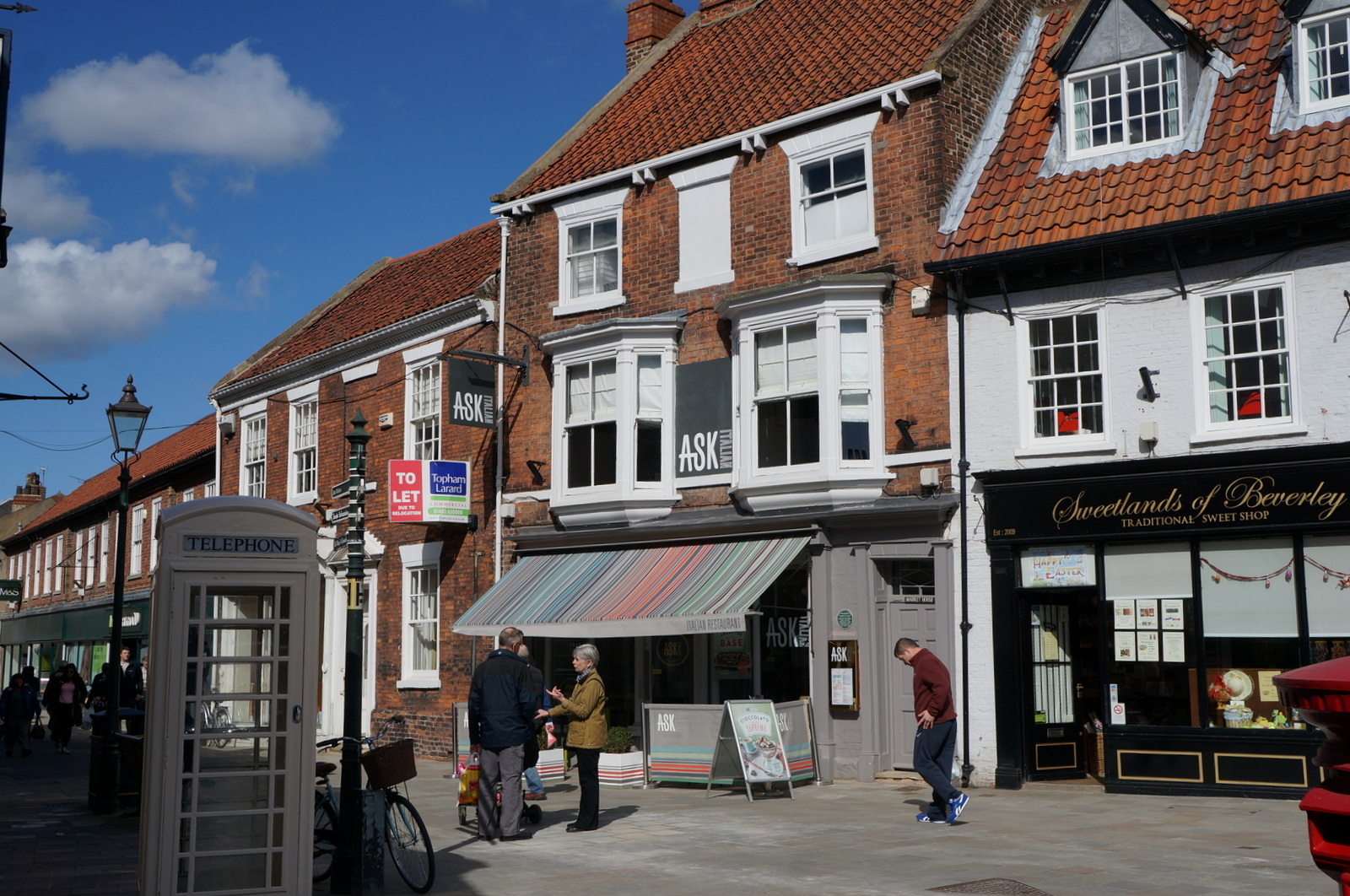
- Restaurant in Beverley, Yorkshire
- Trade name: ASK Italian
- Headquarters: London, England, UK
- Number of locations: 120
- Owner: Azzurri Central Limited
- Parent: TowerBrook Capital Partners
- Website: www.askitalian.co.uk

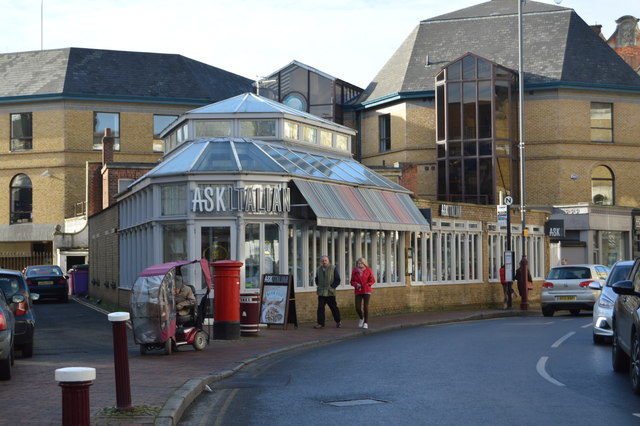
Restaurant in Tunbridge Wells, Kent

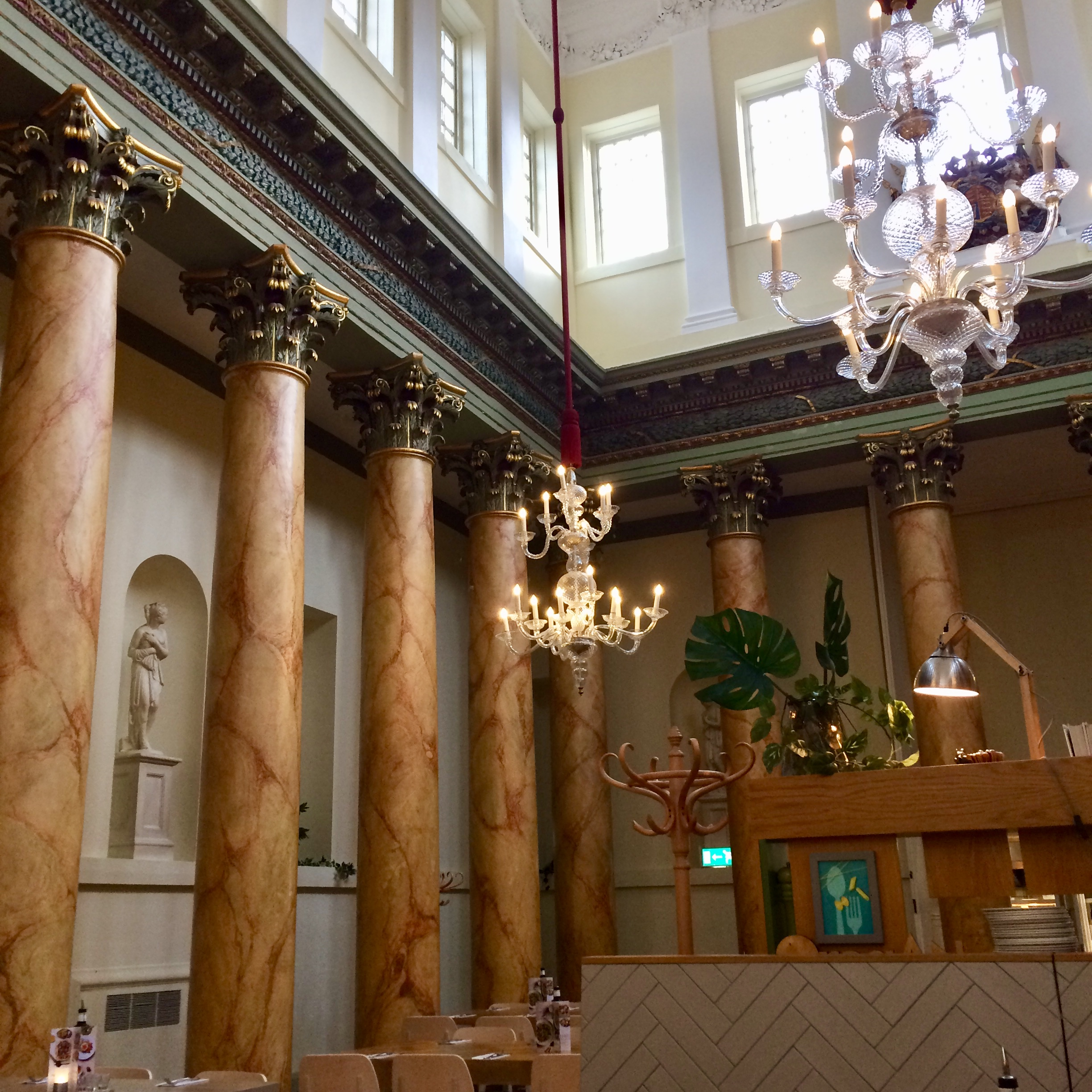
Interior of the York Assembly Rooms, now an ASK Italian restaurant

ASK Italian Restaurants Limited, trading as ASK or ASK Italian, is a British casual dining restaurant chain that serves Italian cuisine based in London, England.

The chain, founded by brothers Adam and Samuel Kaye in 1993, and floated on AIM in 1995, was the subject of a public-to-private deal in 2004, after which it was merged with Pizza Express to form Gondola Holdings, later part of the Gondola Group. It was acquired along with Zizzi for £250 million by Bridgepoint Capital in February 2015. It was later bought in 2020 by TowerBrook Capital Partners.

The name is made up of the founders' initials, though it is often misunderstood as an acronym for "Authentic Sicilian Kitchen". The chain rebranded itself from "ASK" to "ASK Italian" in 2010.

== Theo Randall ==
In 2010, Theo Randall started working with ASK Italian restaurants as their "expert friend", developing menus and coming up with new dishes. In June 2015, he became an investor in the Azzurri Group, which owns and runs the restaurant chain.

== Charity fundraising ==
ASK Italian partnered with Great Ormond Street Hospital Children's Charity in 2008 to donate £1 for every kids' menu sold during the campaign, and by asking customers to add a £1 donation onto their bill. This raised £73,000 in four weeks. The chain went on to raise a further £200,000 for the charity in the following two years, including through celebrity cookbook sales, a digital charity box, and donations from a range of dishes.

== Controversies ==
In November 2015, the chain was one of seven restaurants surveyed that failed to meet a basic level of sustainability in its seafood.

In November 2019, Azzurri Restaurants admitted in court that a dish described as "lobster and king prawns" contained only 35% lobster, and had white fish and other ingredients mixed in and formed to appear as lobster meat. The dish was sold between 2014 and March 2019.

== COVID-19 pandemic ==
On 20 March 2020, all restaurants in the United Kingdom were closed indefinitely due to new rules regarding the national lockdown initiated by the government to reduce the spread of COVID-19. On 17 July 2020, Azzurri Group, owner of the Zizzi and ASK Italian chains, announced the closure of 75 restaurants with the loss of up to 1,200 jobs.

== Works ==
- The ASK Italian Cookbook (2012)

== See also ==
- List of Italian restaurants
