= AMT Coffee =

UK chain of coffeehouses

- Type: Coffee shop
- Industry: Restaurant
- Founded: 1993; 33 years ago
- Founder: McCallum-Toppin brothers
- Headquarters: London, England, UK
- Number of locations: ▼14 (2025)
- Website: amtcoffee.co.uk

AMT Coffee is a British coffeehouse brand that focuses on locations in hospitals and railway stations.^{[1]} It was founded in 1993 by Alistair McCallum-Toppin and his two brothers Angus and Allan.

AMT Coffee was the first national coffee company in the UK to use 100% bio-compostable cups and lids, 100% fairtrade coffee and 100% organic milk, as well as the first to be accredited with the Fair Tax Mark.^{[2]} In March 2011, Ethical Consumer named it the most ethical coffee chain.^{[3]}

In November 2022, AMT was bought out of administration by SSP Group. The process was finalised in February 2025 when the AMT Coffee Ltd. would be dissolved on Companies House.

== Locations ==
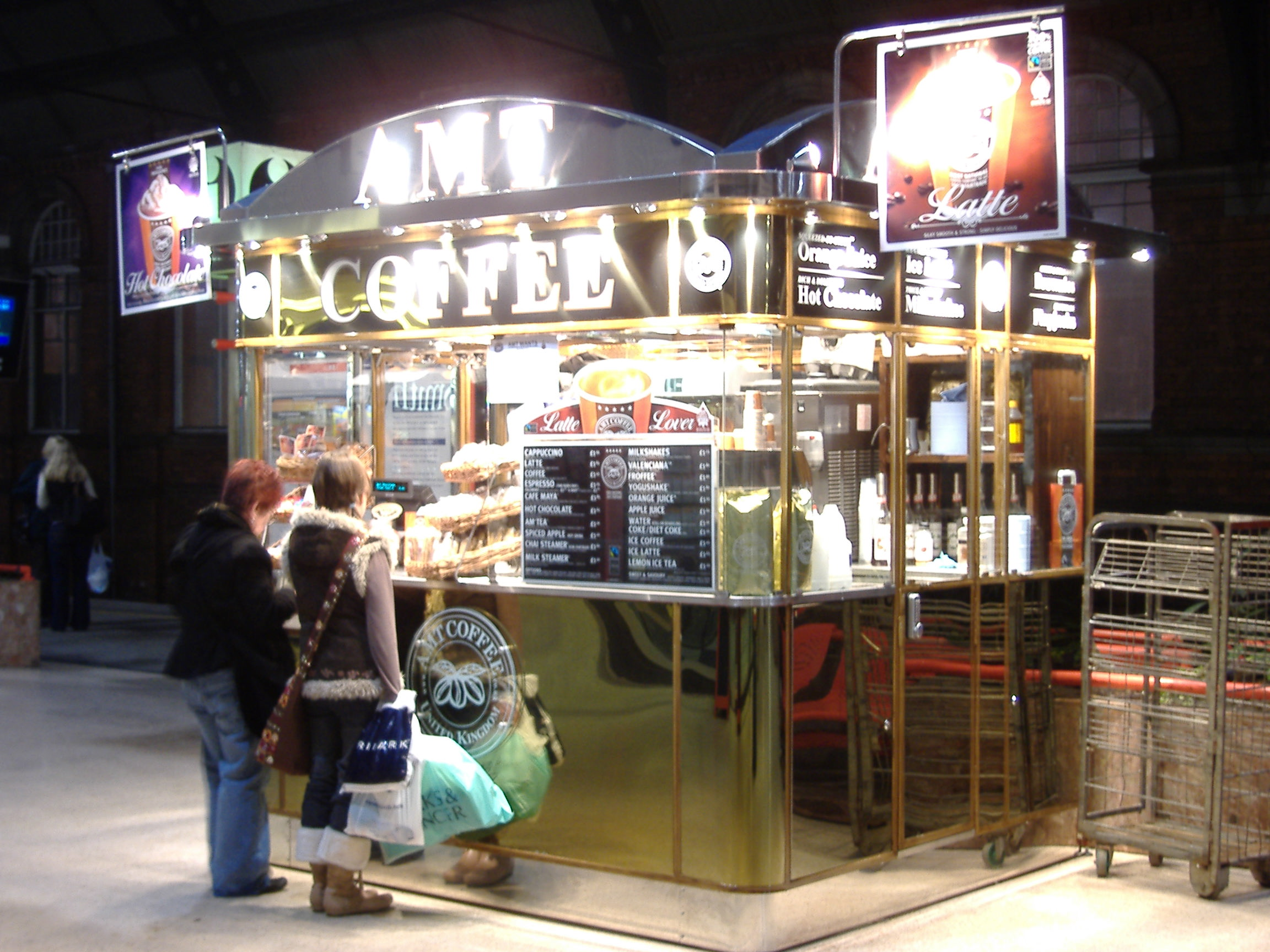
AMT Coffee stand

In 2018, AMT Coffee had over 50 coffee bars across the United Kingdom and Ireland. In 2022, it would cease operations and leave the Irish market.

As of 2025, it has 14 locations.

- East Croydon station
- Evelina London Children's Hospital
- Guy's Hospital
- Hammersmith Hospital
- Marylebone station
- Haymarket railway station
- York railway station
- Stoke-on-Trent railway station
- Norwich railway station
- Royal Berkshire Hospital
- Slough railway station

== See also ==
- List of coffeehouse chains
