= Everyman Cinema, Hampstead =

Cinema and former theatre in Hampstead, London, England

Coordinates: 51.556°N 0.179°W

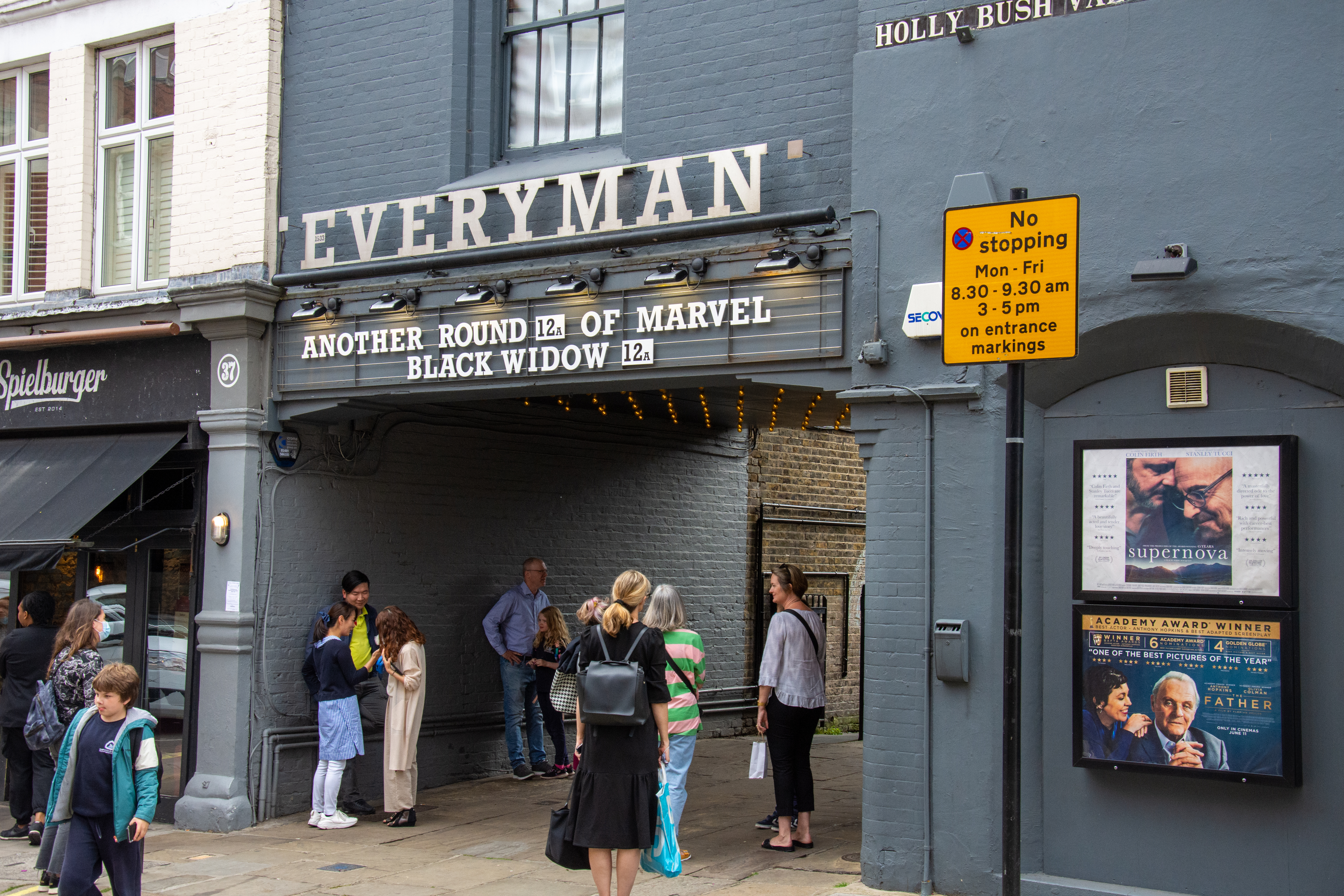
The Everyman Cinema

The Everyman, Hampstead is a cinema and former theatre in Holly Bush Vale, Hampstead, London. It is the original site of the Everyman Cinemas group.

The house opened as the Everyman Theatre in 1920, under the management of Norman MacDermott, who aimed to establish a repertory company comparable to celebrated companies in Birmingham and Dublin. He ran it until 1926, presenting classic and modern plays, but financial problems obliged him to resign. The building was then taken by other managements and continued as a theatre until 1933; it then became a cinema and apart from closure during part of the Second World War it has remained as such.

== Theatre ==
The Everyman Theatre was founded by Norman MacDermott, who had been a businessman for twelve years before his first venture into theatrical production in 1918. In 1920 he acquired the lease of a redundant drill hall near the Hampstead tube station in north London and converted it into what The Times called "a very serviceable theatre". It was MacDermott's aim to establish a repertory company – an innovation in London – comparable with the Birmingham Repertory and Abbey Theatre, Dublin companies.

The Everyman opened for its first performance on 15 September 1920. The play was The Bonds of Interest by the Spanish dramatist Jacinto Benavente, which the Theatre Guild had presented in translation on Broadway. MacDermott followed this with a play by John Masefield, The Tragedy of Nan, and then the first of sixteen productions of plays by Bernard Shaw, You Never Can Tell. The Times later observed that MacDermott had "put an end after something like five years to the virtual banishment of Shaw from the London stage".

MacDermott ran the theatre until 1926; he presented works by contemporary British writers including John Galsworthy, Arnold Bennett and A. A. Milne; classics by Shakespeare, Molière and Ibsen; and foreign dramatists including Arthur Schnitzler, Eugene O'Neill and Luigi Pirandello. A production that attracted particular attention was Noël Coward's The Vortex (1924), with the author and Lilian Braithwaite in the main roles. The play, with drug abuse as its ostensible theme and hints of homosexuality as a subtext, survived scrutiny from the official theatre censor, the Lord Chamberlain – who summoned both MacDermott and Coward to make their case – and the extensive press coverage ensured success. In the words of the biographer Philip Hoare, "The Vortex became, overnight, the most sought-after ticket in town", and a West End transfer followed.

Although MacDermott could offer only modest pay he attracted many well-known actors to his company. The men included Felix Aylmer, Henry Kendall, Roger Livesey, Raymond Massey, Claude Rains and Ernest Thesiger; actresses included Mrs Patrick Campbell, Fabia Drake, Edith Evans, Athene Seyler, Mabel Terry-Lewis and May Whitty.

The company was perpetually short of money, and in early 1926, faced with a steep rise in the rent of the theatre, MacDermott withdrew. The theatre was taken on by a group including Raymond Massey and Allan Wade. Productions included new plays by Michael Arlen and Coward, and works by Pirandello, Galsworthy and Chekhov.

== Cinema ==
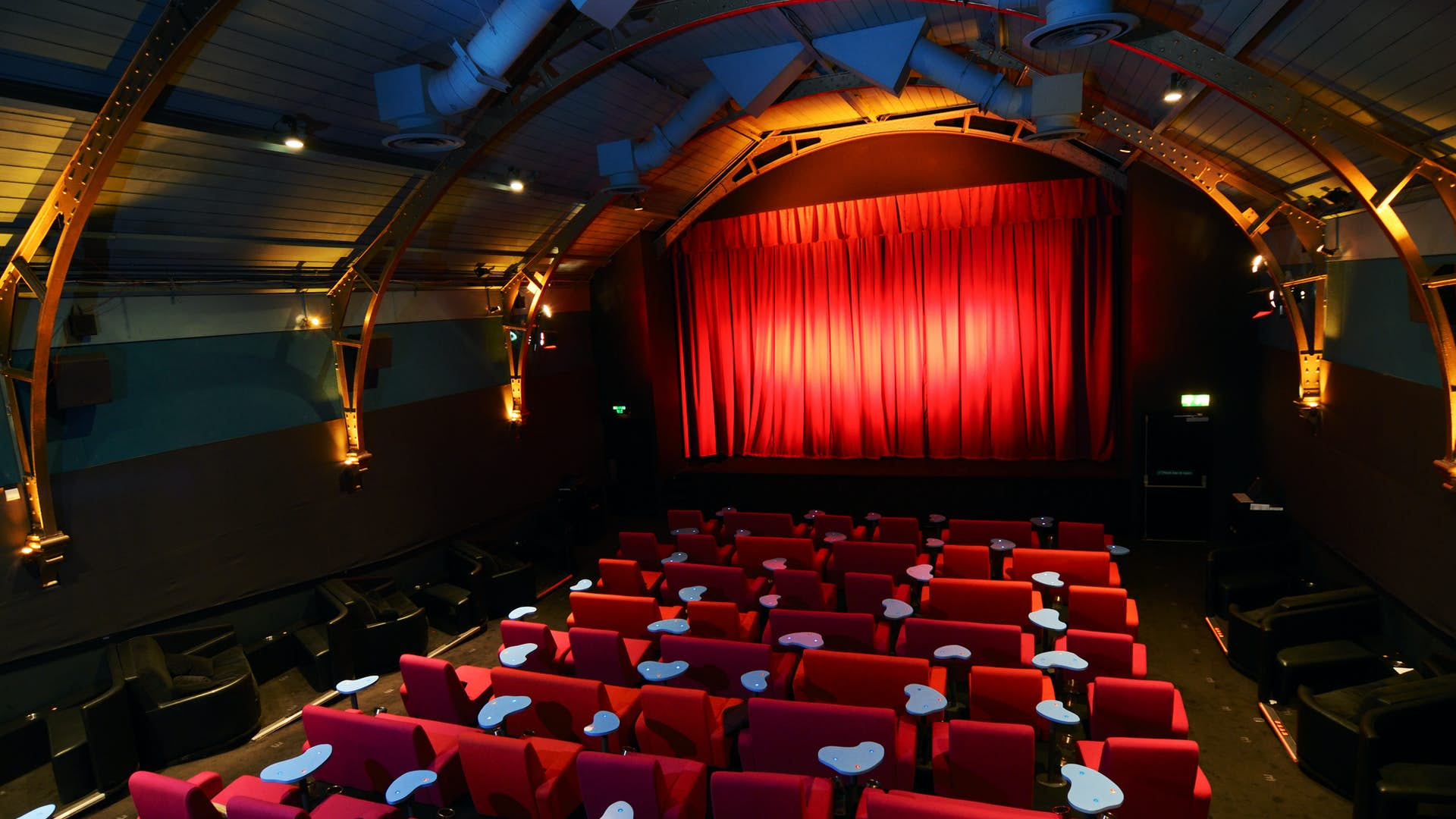
Screen 1

The theatre became a cinema in 1933. The aim of the new owners – a local solicitor, James Fairfax Jones, and his artist wife Tess – was to show good films, mostly revivals, from around the world. The house was obliged to close in September 1940 because of conditions during the Second World War. The Fairfax Joneses re-opened it in February 1946. In 1973 Fairfax Jones died and the cinema passed to a family trust. Adrian Turner, formerly the assistant manager, ran the cinema, ending the conventional seven-day runs in favour of a more varied programme including film noir and Hollywood musicals. The building was renovated in 1984 and again in 1998, when Pullman Cinemas, a small chain, took it over, but soon put it on the market after continued heavy losses.

The Everyman was bought by a property entrepreneur, Daniel Broch, in 2000 and it became the first in the Everyman Cinema Group. The cinema shows new releases, as well as classic films and special events, such as the New York Metropolitan Opera, National Theatre Live, film festivals, live Q&As, and seasons.

The venue features two public screens (a 122-seat room with club suites, gallery seating and a vaulted ceiling; and a more intimate 72-seat screen), as well as a private hire room, a licensed bar and restaurant, Sony Digital 4K projectors, and Dolby Digital surround sound.

== Sources ==
- Hoare, Philip (1995). Noël Coward, A Biography. London: Sinclair-Stevenson. ISBN 978-1-4081-0675-4.
- MacDermott, Norman (1975). Everymania: The History of the Everyman Theatre, Hampstead, 1920–1926. London: Society for Theatre Research. ISBN 0-85-430024-4.
- Parker, John, ed. (1925). Who's Who in the Theatre (fifth ed.). London: Sir Isaac Pitman and Sons. OCLC 10013159.
