= O'Briens Irish Sandwich Bars =

Irish café chain

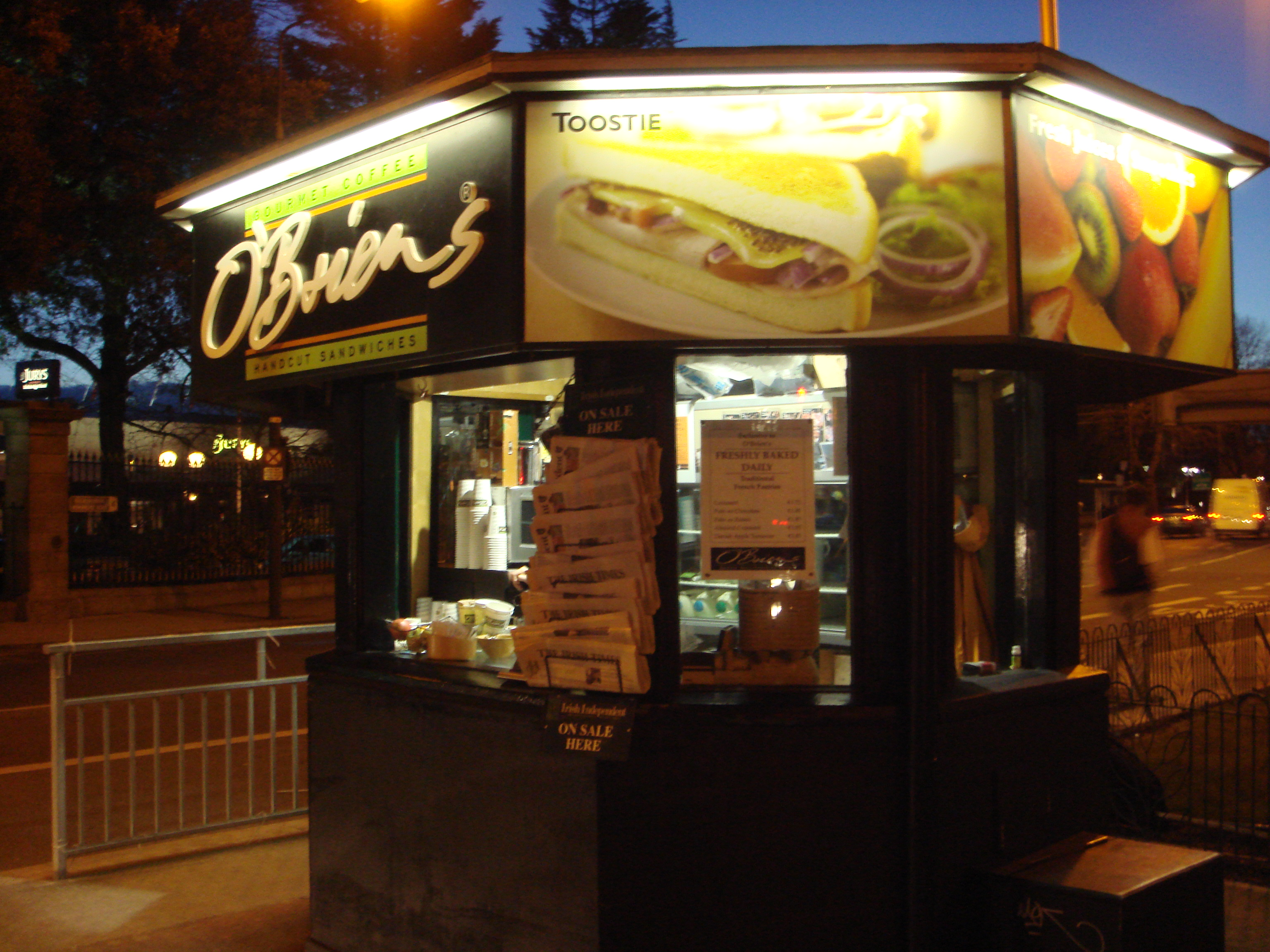
O'Briens Irish Sandwich Cafe' Ballsbridge kiosk in Dublin, Ireland

O'Briens Irish Sandwich Cafe, also known as O'Briens, is an Irish franchise sandwich cafe chain founded in Ireland in 1988 by Brody Sweeney. As of October 2009, O'Briens was operated by the AIL Group, who owns Abrakebabra.

== Foundations ==
In 1988, Irish businessman, Brody Sweeney set up his first sandwich shop in Dublin. Sweeney reportedly chose the name O'Brien's because it was the most common name in the phone book and he wanted a very common Irish surname in the event of expansion overseas.

In 2009, the company went into liquidation and was purchased by Abrakebabra Investments Limited.

Initially operating only in Ireland, the chain once operated sandwich bars in Australia, China, Gibraltar, Indonesia, Bahrain, Malaysia, the Netherlands, Saudi Arabia, Singapore, Taiwan, Thailand and the United Kingdom.

== See also ==
- List of Irish companies
