= PizzaExpress =

British restaurant group

PizzaExpress (Restaurants) Limited
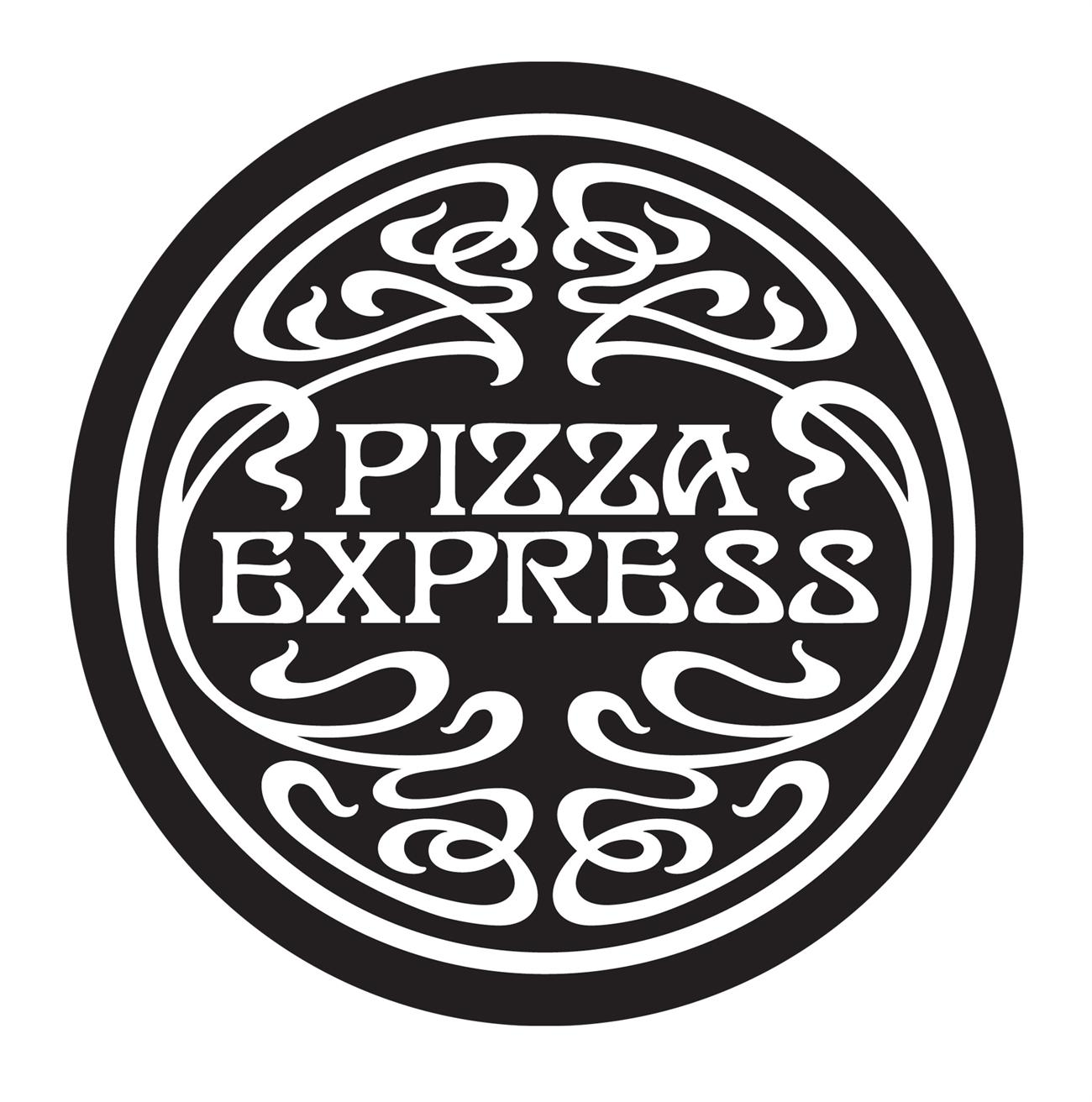
- Trade name: PizzaExpress; Pizza Marzano; Pizza Milano
- Type: Private company limited by shares
- Industry: Casual dining
- Founded: 1965; 61 years ago
- Founder: Peter Boizot
- Headquarters: Uxbridge, England, UK
- Number of locations: 370 (UK), 80 (Internationally)
- Key people: Allan Leighton (chairman); Paula Mackenzie (Group CEO)
- Products: Italian cuisine
- Owner: Wheel Topco Limited
- Website: pizzaexpress.com

PizzaExpress (Restaurants) Limited, trading as PizzaExpress (also called Pizza Marzano or Milano), is a British multinational pizza restaurant chain based in Uxbridge, England. It also ran the brand Za between 2019 and 2023.

Founded in London in 1965 by Peter Boizot, the group operates around 370 restaurants in the United Kingdom and Ireland, and 80 internationally. The group is ultimately owned through Wheel Topco Limited, which is majority owned by investment firms Bain Capital and Cyrus Capital Partners.

PizzaExpress Live runs several music venues, including PizzaExpress Live Soho and PizzaExpress Live Chelsea.

== History ==
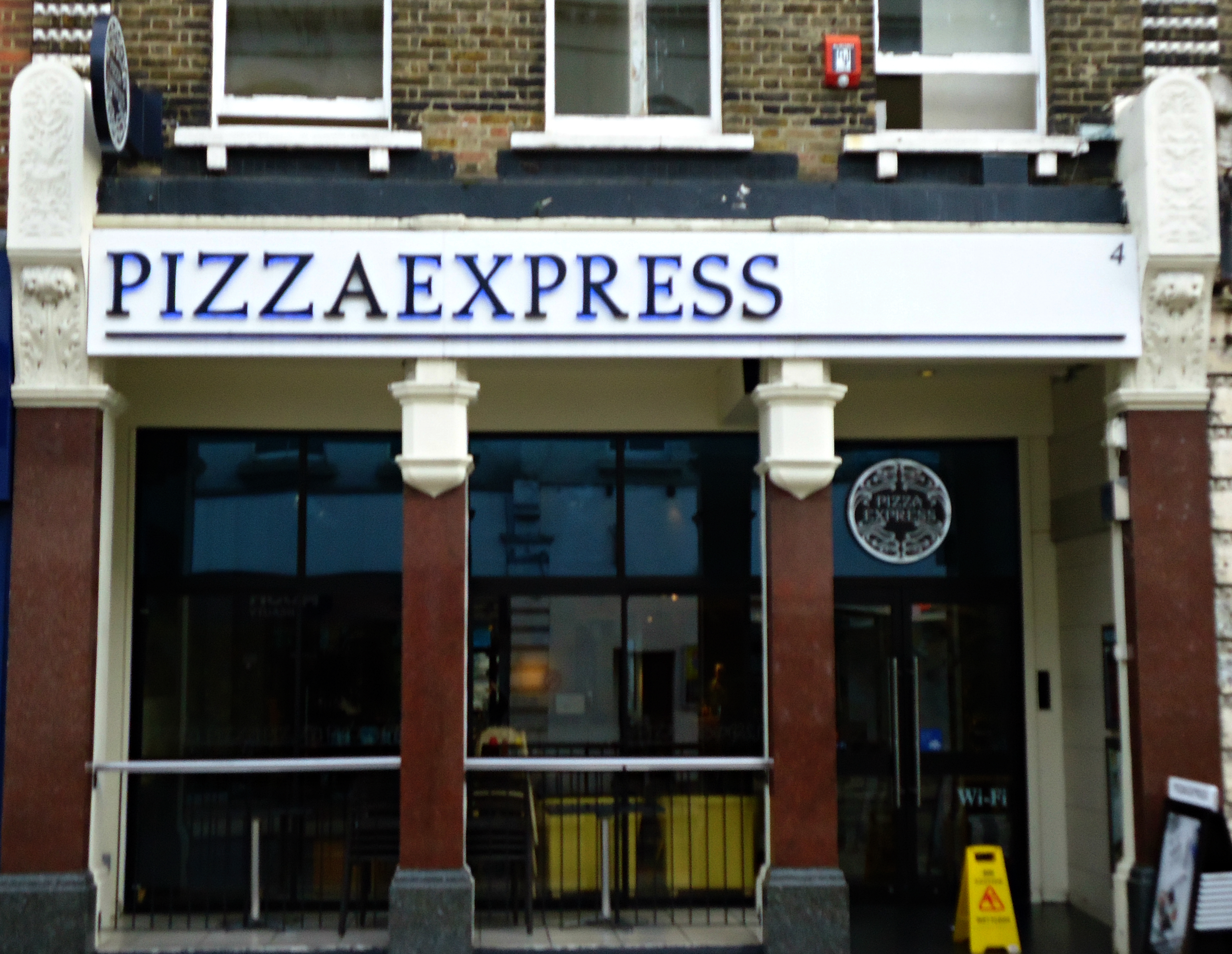
The Sutton, London branch, which opened in the late 1980s, and won a local architectural award

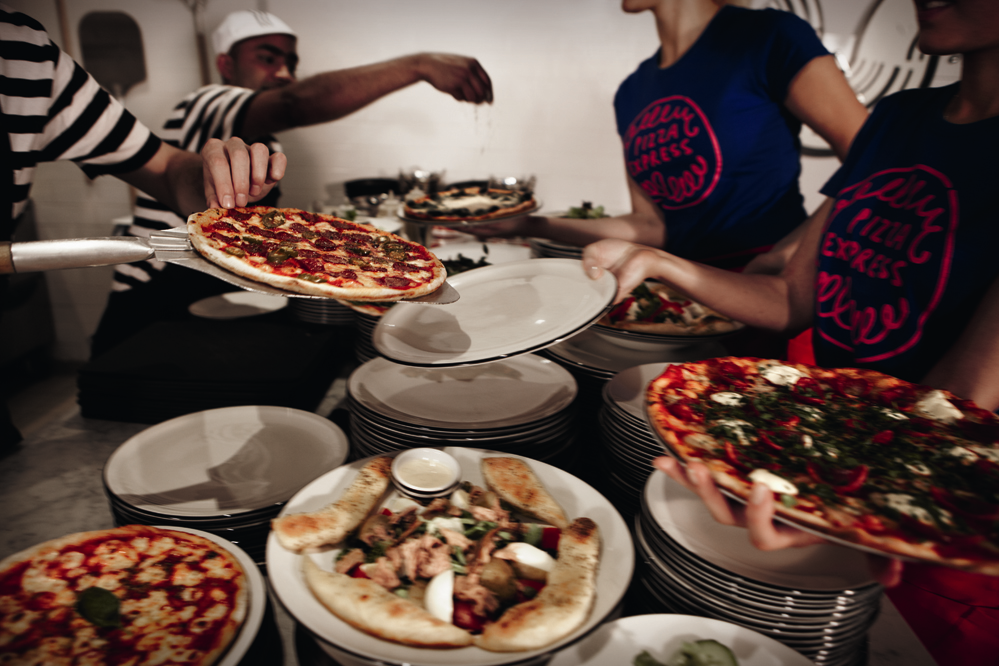
Example of food from PizzaExpress

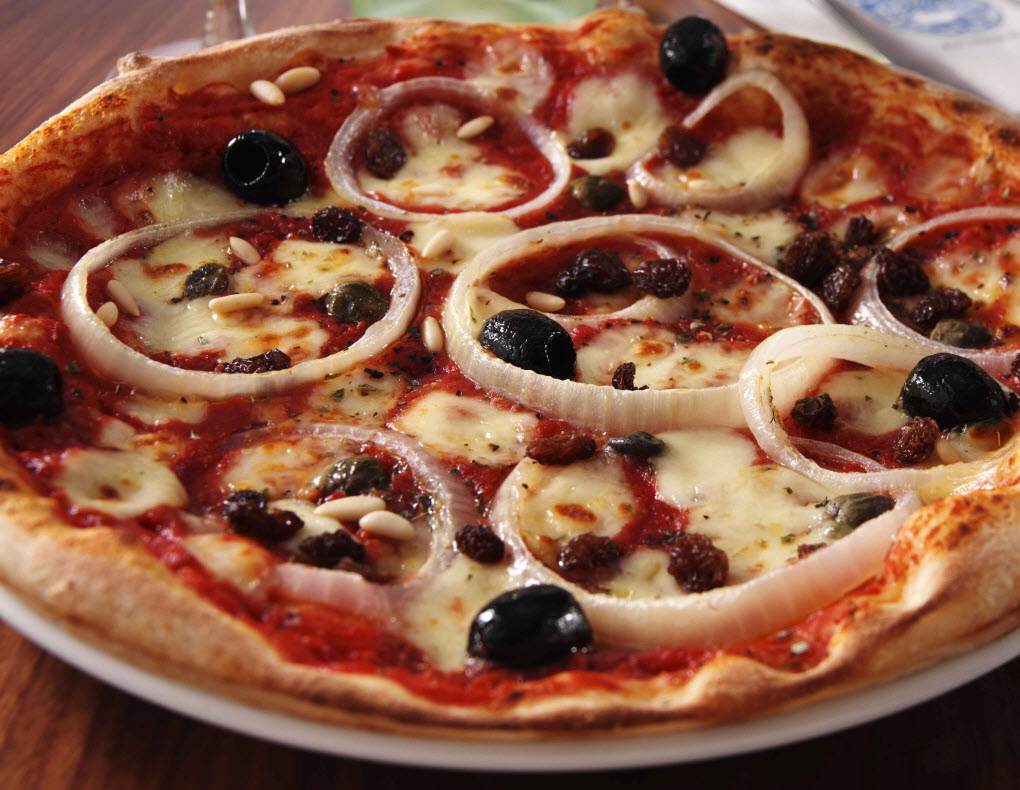
Veneziana Pizza

Peter Boizot opened the first PizzaExpress restaurant in Wardour Street, London, in 1965. Inspired by a trip to Italy, Boizot brought back to London a pizza oven from Naples and a chef from Sicily. He commissioned Italian restaurant designer and cartoonist Enzo Apicella to design the PizzaExpress identity and over 80 restaurants.

In 1969, the Dean Street restaurant in London began hosting live jazz performances. Performers have included Ella Fitzgerald, Amy Winehouse, and early-career appearances by Norah Jones and Jamie Cullum.

PizzaExpress introduced the Pizza Veneziana in 1977 to help save Venice from sinking by donating 5p of every pizza sold to the Venice in Peril Fund. Over the years, the amount donated from each pizza has increased to 25p. From 2008, donations from the Veneziana pizza go to the Veneziana Fund, where 50% is donated to the Venice in Peril Fund and 50% is given to the restoration, repair and maintenance of buildings, fixtures and fittings of buildings and works of art created before 1750.

PizzaExpress expanded into Ireland in 1995 and as of 2015 operated 14 restaurants there under the brand name Milano. The company also owns the brand name Marzano. Originally, Marzano, or Pizza Marzano was used in countries where the brand name PizzaExpress was not available, as with the use of the name Milano in Ireland, but it also exists in some territories, such as Cyprus, to differentiate between the restaurants selling primarily pizza and those offering a wider range of non-pizza meals inspired by Italian cuisine. As of 2015 is also used for a cafe-bar run as an adjunct to the branch of PizzaExpress in The Forum in Norwich, Cafe Bar Marzano.

In 1999, PizzaExpress introduced its Schools Programme, a programme where the company turns its restaurants into classrooms, educating children about fresh ingredients, how to run a local business and how to cook for themselves.

=== Private to Public to Private again ===
After 28 years as a private company the company was floated on the main market of London Stock Exchange. At that time in February 1993 it merged its company owned pizzeria with its largest franchisee, G&F Group and both companies reversed into the quoted Star Computers plc. These other entities were controlled by David Page, Luke Johnson and Hugh Osmond. After 10 years of expansion from 24 to over 300 company owned sites the company was purchased by TDR Capital and Capricorn Associates who bought the company in 2003, turning it private again. In 2005, PizzaExpress re-floated on the London Stock Exchange, as part of Gondola Holdings. It was then bought by private equity group Cinven as the Gondola Group in 2007. In 2008, PizzaExpress started a Guest Chef Series with chef Theo Randall, of Theo Randall at InterContinental London, creating exclusive dishes for its menu. Francesco Mazzei, of L'Anima, came on board in 2010 to develop a menu inspired by the cuisine of Calabria.

In 2011, PizzaExpress launched a major rebrand of its UK restaurants, with menu changes, a black and white logo and the widespread use of stripes, both for staff uniforms and for restaurant decor. The celebrity chef series continued in 2012 with the introduction of two pizzas made by television cook Valentine Warner. Warner introduced the fennel and salami pizza and the puttanesca pizza. PizzaExpress created a 'Living Lab' in October 2010, in Richmond, trialling new ideas from design to sound, collaborating with designer Ab Rogers.

In July 2014, the group was sold to the China-based private equity firm Hony Capital in a deal worth £900 million.

In 2016, PizzaExpress launched its partnership with Macmillan Cancer Support, with a discretionary 25p donation from every Padana pizza sold going to help he charity provide financial, emotional, medical and practical support for people affected by cancer. As of May 2017, the partnership has raised over £500,000.

In October 2019, PizzaExpress hired financial advisors in preparation for its talks with creditors. The chain had been experiencing financial difficulties arising from a downturn in consumer demand for eating out. In March 2020, all UK restaurants were forced to close indefinitely due to nationwide lockdown rules introduced by the government to limit the spread of COVID-19. On 28 May 2020, select London restaurants reopened for delivery services as the government began to lift lockdown restrictions. In July, it was announced that "dozens" of the closed restaurants would not be reopening. The restaurant group was reported to have a debt pile of £1.1 billion. The next month, it was announced that the company was set to close around 67 restaurants throughout the UK and also cut 1,100 jobs. In November 2020, Hony Capital left the business and the group restructure was completed, helping to cut the chain's debt by more than £400 million.

In July 2020, the business was taken over by its bondholders under a debt-for-equity swap with previous owner Hony Capital. It was confirmed in September that 73 of its restaurants would close permanently, including the chain's first-ever branch in Wardour Street. In October 2020, PizzaExpress filed for Chapter 15 bankruptcy in the United States. In November 2020, the group completed restructuring and its debt was reduced by more than £400 million. A further 23 branches were earmarked for closure in January 2021.

Za was a brand of PizzaExpress offering a more casual version of the pizzeria in the United Kingdom. The first restaurant was launched at the Fenchurch Street site in February 2019. The opening of Za was part of a five-year plan to refresh and improve the brand, called Future Express. Za ceased operation as a brand as of 2023.

== PizzaExpress Live ==
PizzaExpress Live runs several music venues, including PizzaExpress Live Soho and PizzaExpress Live Chelsea.
