= Zizzi =

English restaurant chain

Zizzi Restaurants Limited
- Trade name: Zizzi
- Founded: 1999; 27 years ago
- Founders: Adam and Sam Kaye
- Headquarters: London, England, UK
- Number of locations: 137 (as of September 2023)
- Owner: Azzurri Central Limited
- Parent: TowerBrook Capital Partners
- Website: www.zizzi.co.uk

Zizzi Restaurants Limited, trading as Zizzi, is a chain of Italian-inspired restaurants in the United Kingdom and Ireland based in London, England. It is the sister restaurant of ASK Italian, both having been founded by Adam and Sam Kaye. In February 2015, Bridgepoint Capital completed a £250 million acquisition of the two brands. They were subsequently bought by TowerBrook Capital Partners in 2020.

== Locations ==
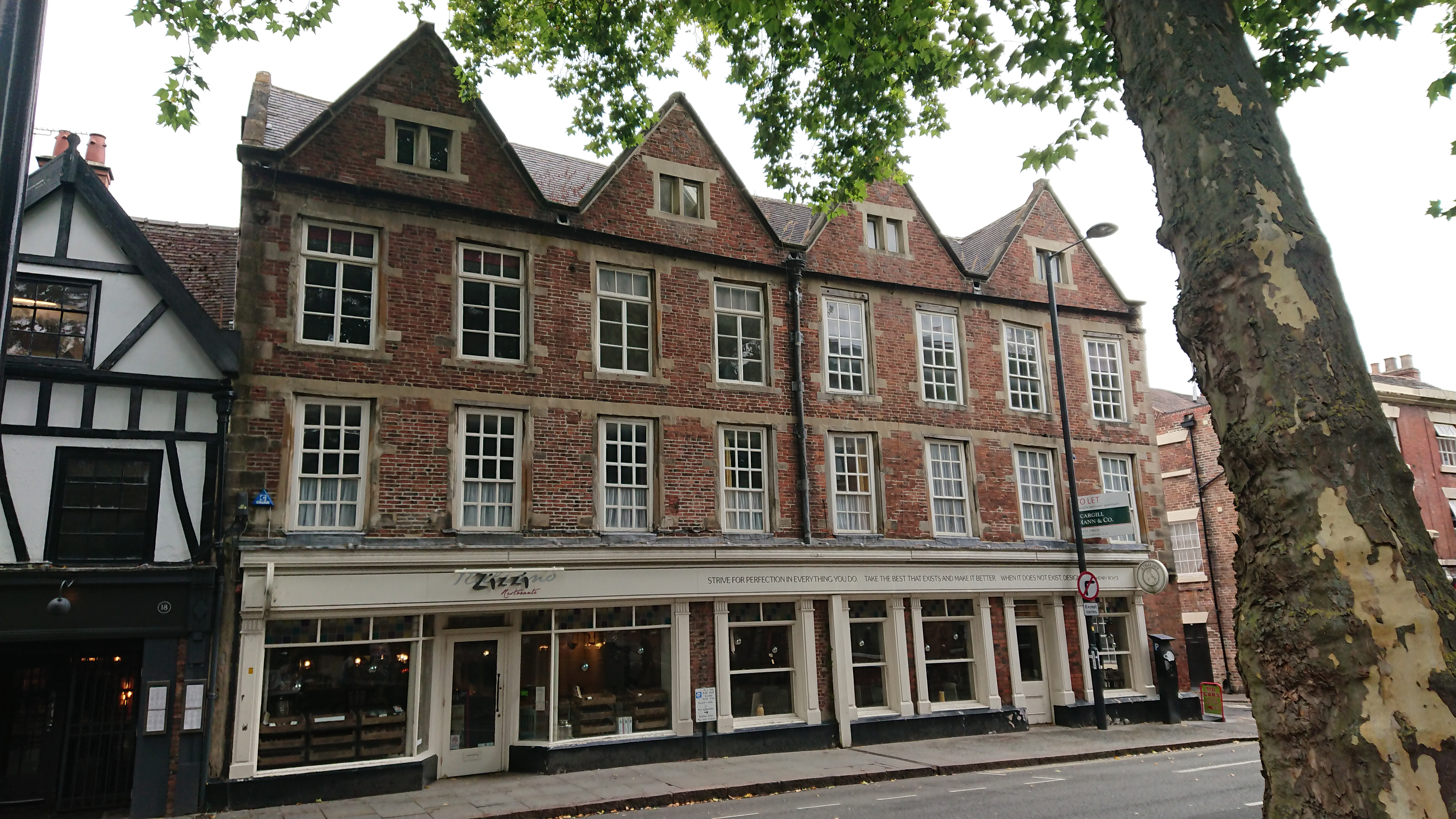
Zizzi restaurant in Friar Gate, Derby

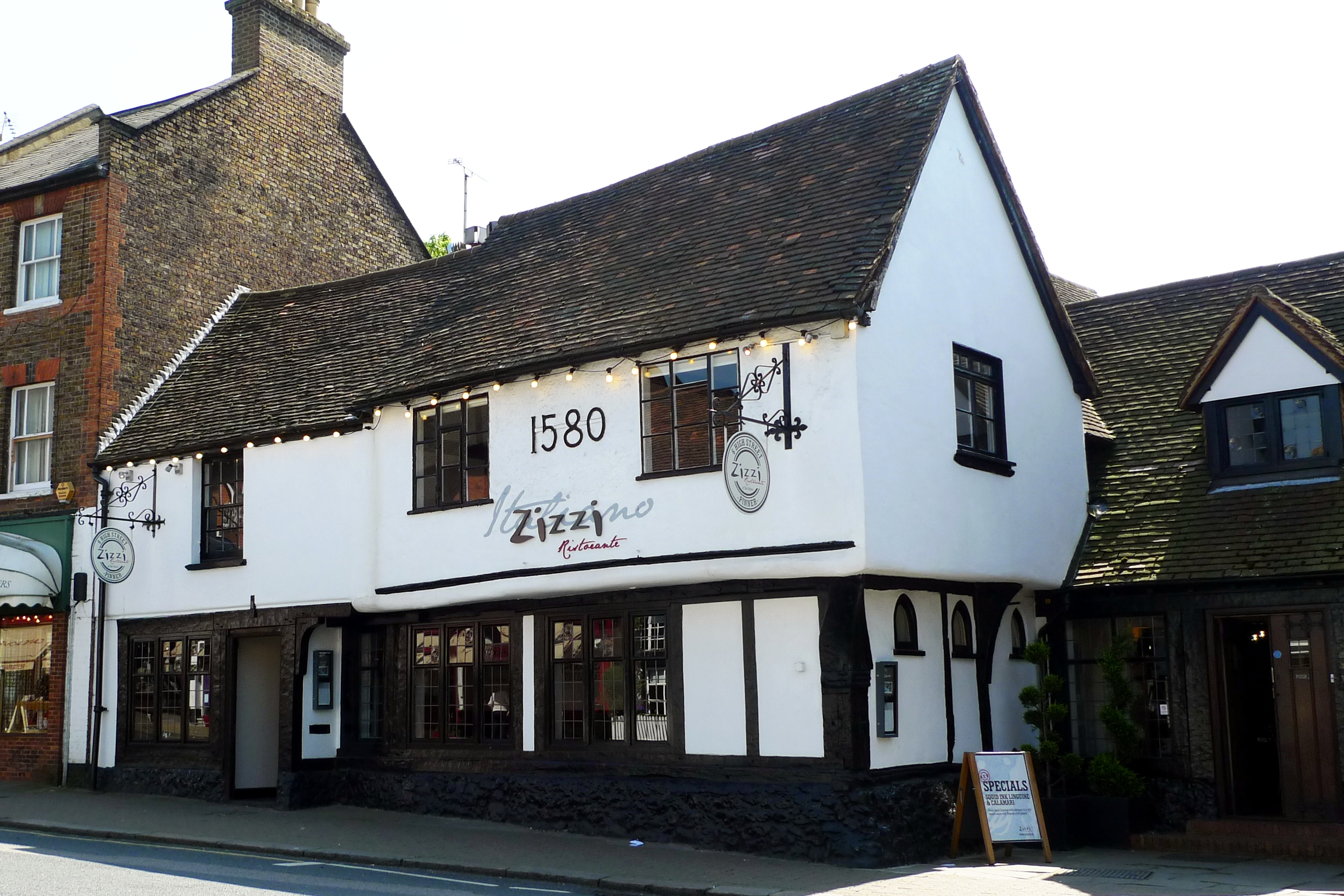
Zizzi restaurant in Pinner, Middlesex

The first Zizzi restaurant opened in Chiswick in 1999. As of October 2025, the Zizzi portfolio includes 138 restaurants. About 27 in London and Greater London, as well as locations throughout the United Kingdom (and also Dublin in ROI).

On 17 July 2020, during the COVID-19 pandemic, Azzurri Group, owner of the Zizzi and ASK Italian chains, announced the closure of 75 restaurants with the loss of up to 1,200 jobs.

== Notable incidents ==
=== Strand self-harm incident ===
On 22 April 2007, a 35-year-old Polish man entered the Zizzi restaurant on The Strand and made his way into the kitchen, where he obtained a knife. He then used it to sever his penis in front of diners. Whilst it was initially believed that attempts to re-attach the appendage had been unsuccessful, The Guardian reported later that week that surgeons had, in fact, been able to do so, "in the first operation of its kind in the country", a procedure that was carried out at St Thomas' Hospital after police recovered the penis from the restaurant floor.

=== Salisbury nerve agent poisoning ===
The Zizzi in Salisbury was linked to the poisoning of Sergei and Yulia Skripal since the pair had dined there. Those who had eaten at the restaurant and the nearby Mill Pub on Sunday 4 or Monday 5 March 2018 were advised to take measures such as washing or wiping their personal belongings, even though the risk of harm to other diners was reported to be "low".

== Philanthropy ==
In the summer of 2011, Zizzi began using the Pennies service in all their restaurants to give customers the option to top up their bill with a 20p donation to charity. By March 2012, over £50,000 had been raised for charity, with the majority going to long-standing charity partner The Prince's Trust. Pennies with Zizzi was crowned "Project of the Year" by the Real IT Awards in 2012, also picking up the prize for Corporate, Social and Environmental Responsibility. In 2020, Zizzi won the Lausanne Index Prize for Novel Product of the Year.

== See also ==
- List of Italian restaurants
