= OK Diner =

British restaurant chain

OK Diners Limited
- Industry: Roadside restaurant chain
- Founded: February 1995
- Founder: City Centre Restaurants
- Number of locations: 8 (April 2026)
- Owner: Lawrie & Daughters Limited
- Website: www.okdiners.com

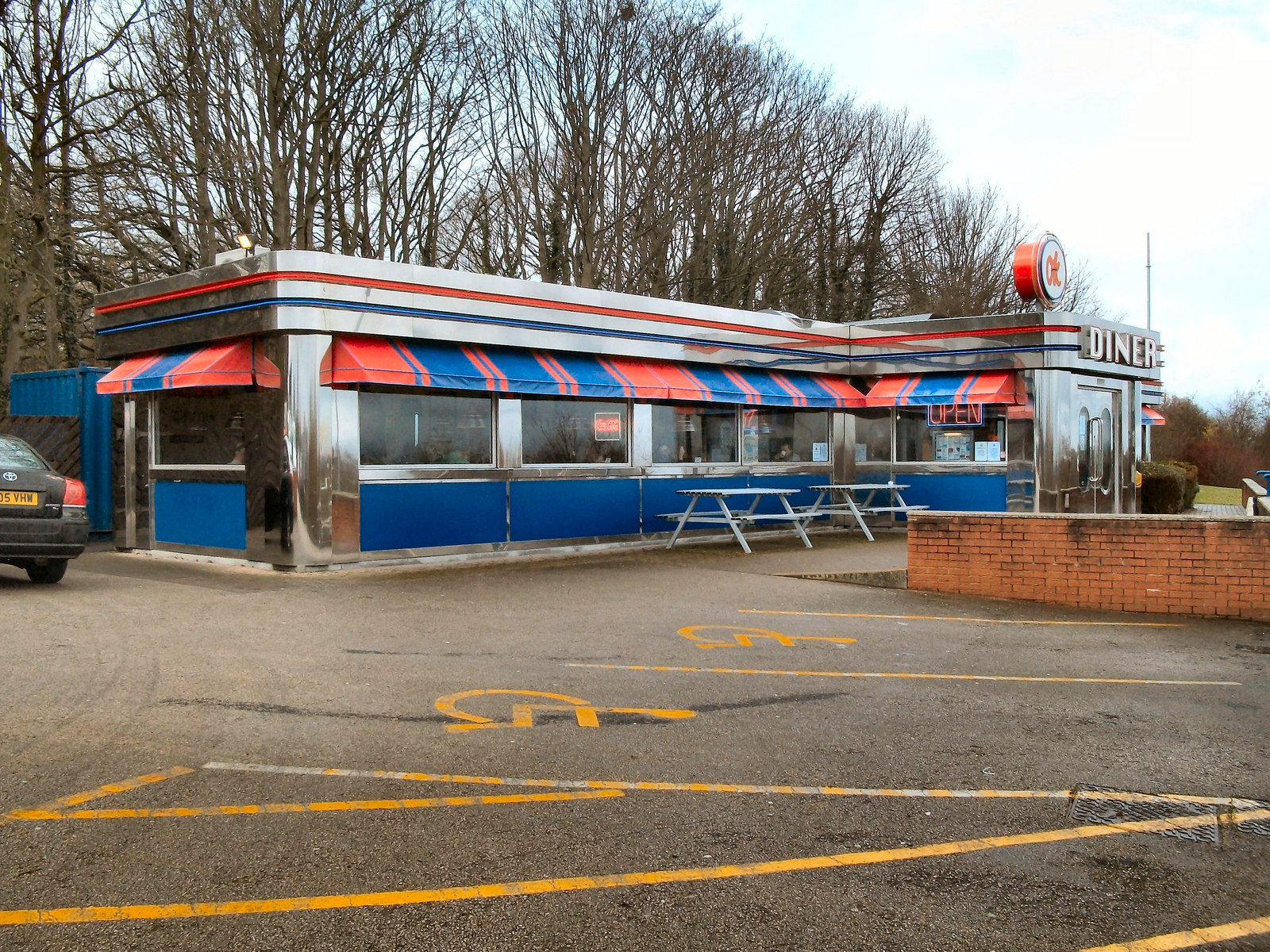
An OK Diner restaurant in Flintshire (February 2010)

OK Diners Limited (trading as OK Diner) is a British chain of roadside restaurants founded in February 1995 by City Centre Restaurants. The chain has a retro American diner theme with 1950s music, chequerboard flooring, booth seating, chrome details and memorabilia on display.

As of April 2026, the chain has eight restaurants, and is owned by Lawrie & Daughters Limited, a real estate business.

== History ==
In February 1995, OK Diner was created by John Roebuck and Tony Horsfall to be part of City Centre Restaurants, who also owned the Frankie & Benny's and Chiquito brands at the time.

In September 2001, City Centre Restaurants sold OK Diner to managers Ian Hendry and Dafydd Poole in order to focus on other business interests.

In January 2004, OK Diner opened in a former Little Chef in Grantham, Lincolnshire. In the following year, it acquired another former Little Chef in Egginton, Derbyshire.

In July 2014, Dafydd Poole (now known as Dafydd Lawrie) bought out Ian Hendry's stake in the business.

In January 2024, the Leominster branch was used as a filming location for an episode of Doctor Who.

In July 2024, OK Diner faced criticism at its Northop Hall restaurant for issuing parking fines to diners. Dafydd Lawrie explained that the restrictions were necessary due to the parking area being misused by visitors accessing nearby services. He added that diners who had contacted their head offices had their fines canceled.

In May 2025, the Leominster branch announced it would celebrate its 30th anniversary with a discount special throughout June.

In April 2026, its Elwick restaurant closed down due to the lease expiring and not being renewed by the landlord.

== Current locations ==
As of April 2026, the chain has eight restaurants.

- A1 Northbound – Carlton-on-Trent, Nottinghamshire
- A1 Southbound – New Fox, Colsterworth, Lincolnshire
- A1 Northbound – Tickencote, Rutland
- A5 – Cannock, Staffordshire
- A38 Southbound – Egginton, Derbyshire
- A49 – Leominster, Herefordshire
- A55 Gateway Services – Northop Hall, Flintshire
- Mile End Roundabout, Oswestry, Shropshire

== See also ==
- Zaks Diners
