= Coast to Coast (restaurant) =

British restaurant chain

- Company type: American themed restaurant chain
- Founded: 2011
- Headquarters: London, United Kingdom
- Owner: The Restaurant Group; (2011–2023); The Big Table; (2023–present)
- Website: c2crestaurants.com

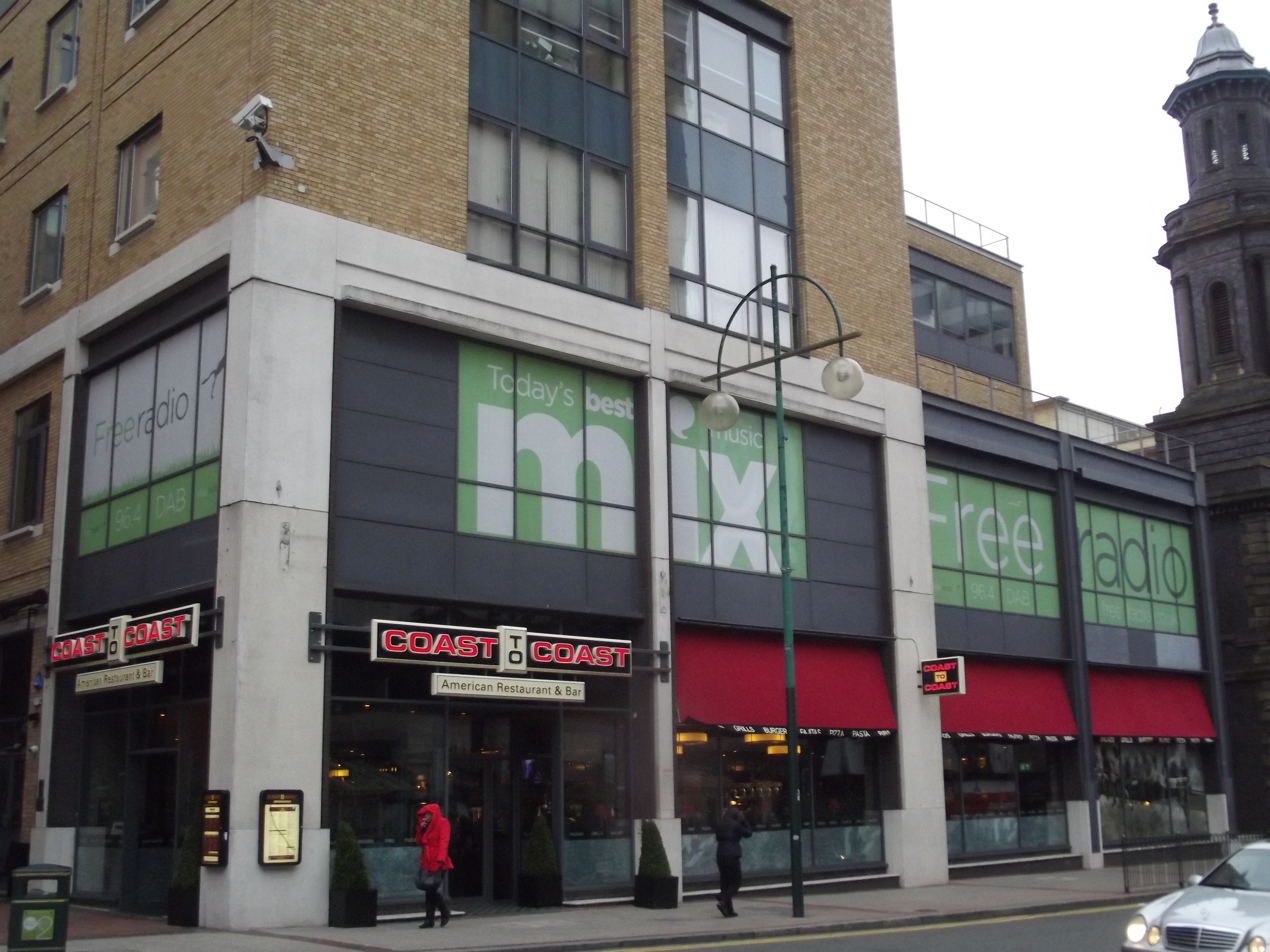
Coast to Coast restaurant in Birmingham, 2014

Coast to Coast is a restaurant chain based in the United Kingdom specialising in American foods.

The company was established in 2011, when the first restaurant was opened at Brighton Marina. At the beginning of 2020 there were 13 restaurants open across the United Kingdom, but, as of July 2021, only the restaurant located in the Trafford Centre, Manchester, remains open, due to closures resulting from the COVID-19 pandemic in the United Kingdom. Coast to Coast is run by the Big Table, which also owns Bella Italia, Chiquito and Frankie & Benny's. In March 2012, Coast to Coast won the New Concept Award at the Menu Innovation and Development Awards (MIDAS).

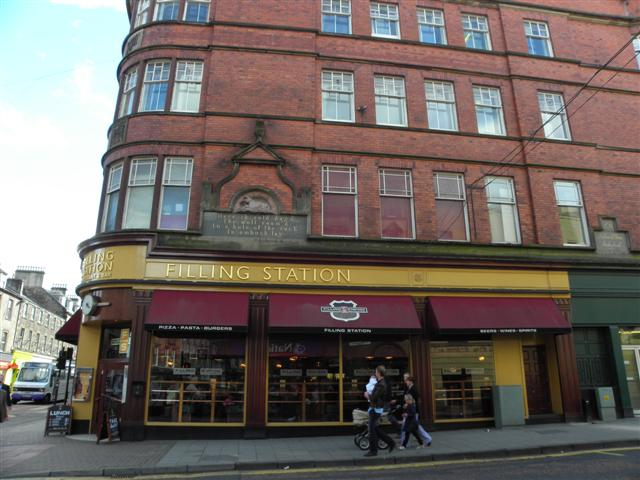
Filling Station restaurant in Stirling, 2010

The restaurants branded Filling Station are the equivalent in Scotland and are also run by the Restaurant Group.

In 2023, TRG sold its loss-making assets (which included Coast to Coast), to The Big Table.
