= Belgo =

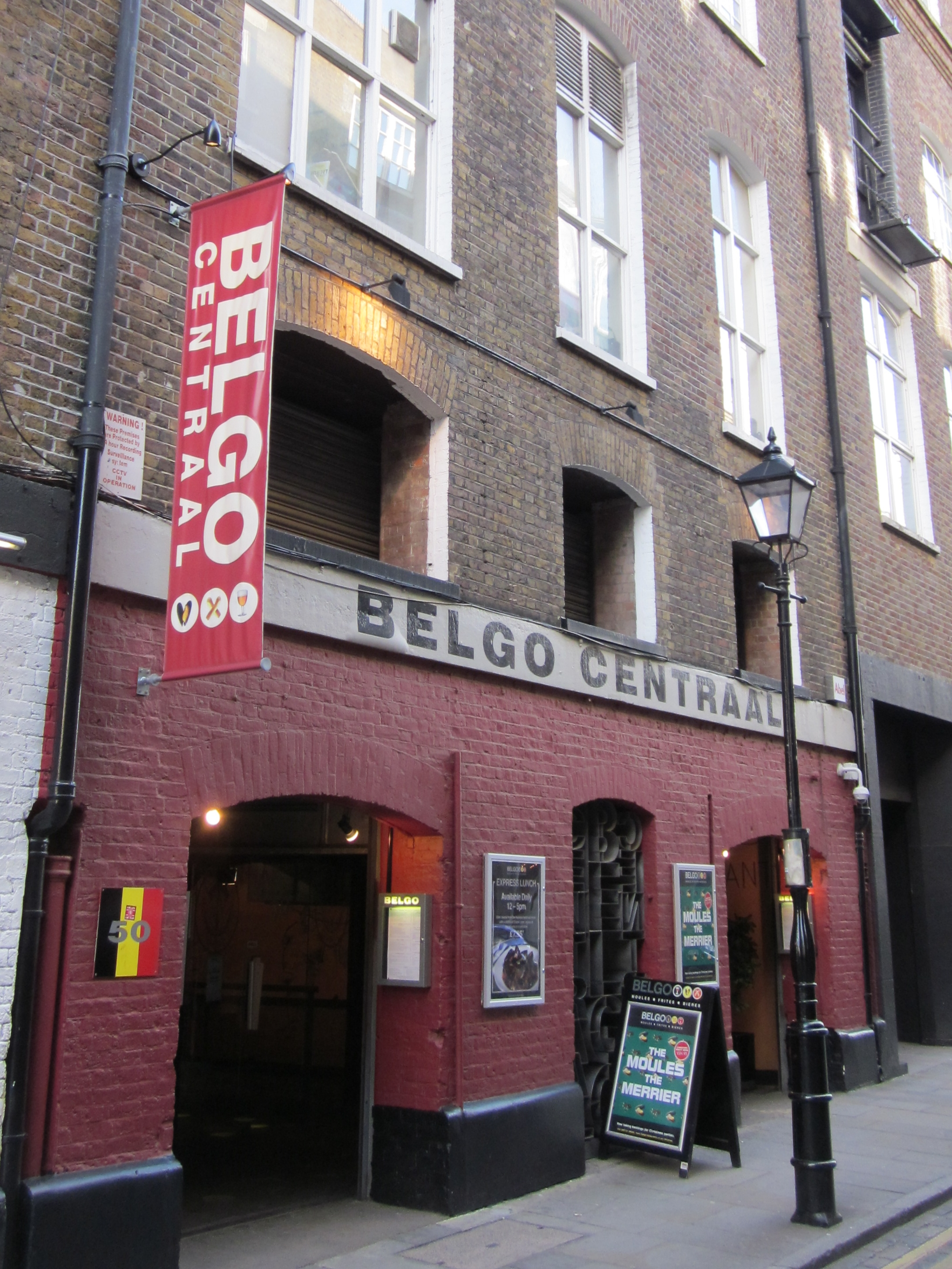
- Interactive map of Belgo

Restaurant information
- Established: 1992
- Closed: 2020
- Owner: Casual Dining Group
- Food type: Belgian
- Location: 1 King's Cross Road, London, UK, WC1X 9HX
- Website: www.belgo.com

Belgo was a chain of London restaurants specializing in simple Belgian cooking and Belgian beer. There were five Belgo restaurants: Belgo Centraal (Covent Garden), Belgo Holborn, Belgo Kings Cross, Belgo Nottingham and Belgo Bromley; following closures announced in July 2020.

The chain was noted for its 1990s design and architecture, including kitchens viewable by customers entering the Centraal restaurant, and waiters and waitresses who dressed as monks.

== History ==
Belgo was founded in 1992 by French-Canadian Denis Blais and Anglo-Belgian Andre Plisnier. For a time, the brand was expanded to a chain of bar-diners known as Bierodrome in Clapham, Kingsway, and Islington, and at Belgo Zuid in Ladbroke Grove – all now closed) but it later reverted to the Belgo format.

Belgo was bought in 1998 by ex-stock market trader, newspaper columnist and ex-Chairman of Channel 4 Luke Johnson—known for his financial stewardship, with colleague Hugh Osmond, of the Pizza Express chain of pizza restaurants in the 1990s. However, attempts to organically extend the Belgo franchise beyond London in the late 1990s were unsuccessful: the franchise in Jersey lasted barely 12 months before closing in 2000. The Belgo flotation was used as a vehicle to acquire a number of celebrated chic London restaurants, such as The Ivy, The Caprice, Daphne's The Collection and J. Sheekey, creating the 'Signature Restaurants' brand division, and a business with a market capital that peaked at more than £90,000,000.

Johnson sold his interest in Belgo in 2005 to Tragus Group, now Casual Dining Group, which also owns the French-styled Café Rouge chain and the Bella Italia chain of Italian restaurants.

In July 2020 on the back of the COVID-19 pandemic, the Casual Dining Group went into administration and it announced that Belgo would permanently close three of its four sites.

== Charity ==
In 2013, Belgo was an official partner of Comic Relief, the British charity founded in 1985 that aims to "bring about positive and lasting change in the lives of poor and disadvantaged people".

== See also ==
- List of restaurants in London
- Strada
