= Gail's =

British bakery and cafe chain

Gail's Ltd
- Founded: 2005; 21 years ago
- Founders: Gail Mejia; Tom Molnar
- Headquarters: London, England
- Number of locations: 170 (as of March 2025)
- Website: gails.com

Gail's is a British bakery and coffee shop chain. Its first outlet opened in Hampstead, London, in 2005. As of March 2025, there were 170 branches in the UK. In 2021, Bain Capital and EBITDA Investments acquired a majority stake.

== History ==
Gail's was founded as a wholesale bakery in Hendon, London, by the baker Yael Mejia in the early 1990s. Mejia was born in Britain and brought up in Israel. In 2003, Tom Molnar and Ran Avidan bought half of the business. The first Gail's cafe opened in Hampstead, London, in 2005. The chain expanded with the rise of foodie culture.

The private equity firm Risk Capital Partners invested in Gail's in 2011. In 2021, Bain Capital, a private investment firm based in Boston, Massachusetts, and EBITDA Investments acquired a majority stake, valuing Gail's at £200 million, with the British entrepreneur Luke Johnson retaining a 15% stake.

In 2024, Gail's won the Best Coffee Shop/Café Group award at the MCA Hospitality Awards. In 2025, it won Bakery Retailer of the Year in the Baking Industry Awards.

== Locations ==
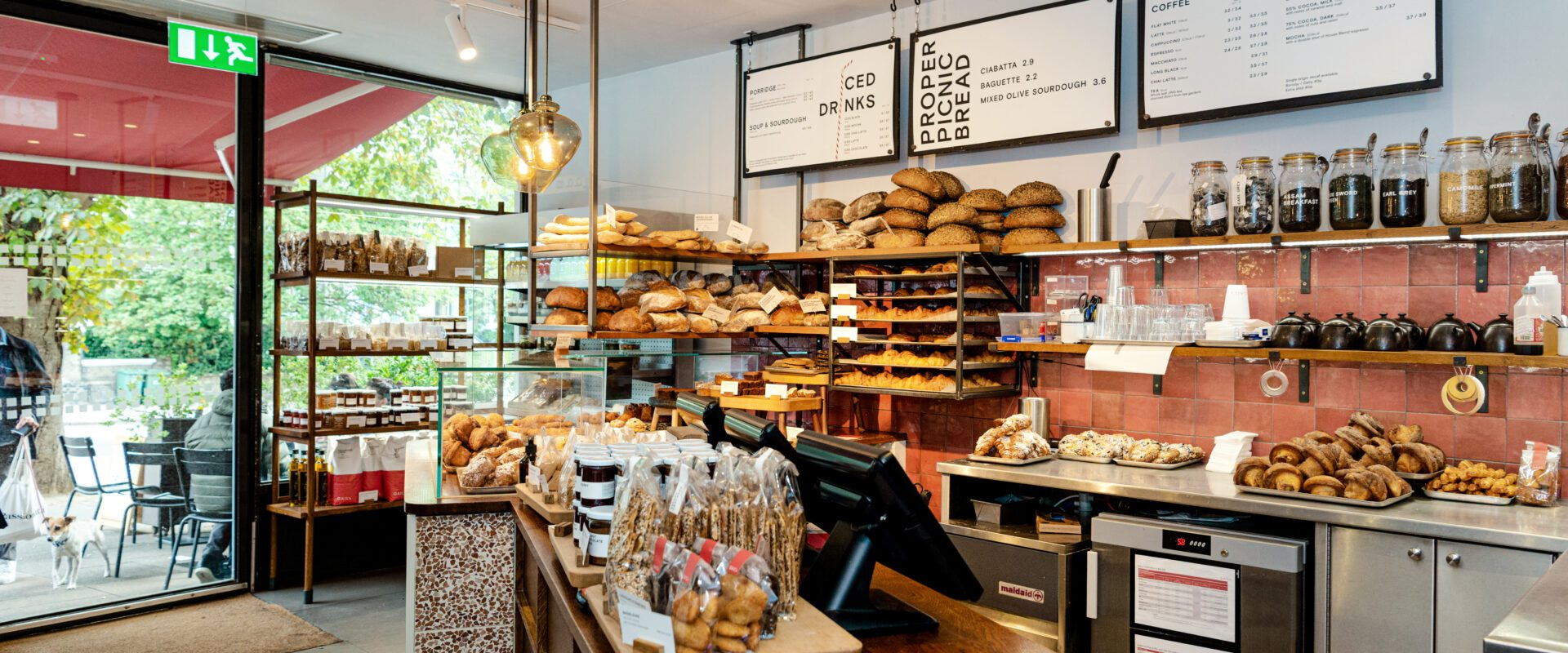
Interior of Gail's Bakery in Belsize Park

In 2021, all Gail's branches were within a 55-mile (90-kilometre) radius of its central bakery and kitchen in Hendon, London. There were 131 branches in the UK by August 2024, and 170 by March 2025.

Molnar said Gail's sought to open cafes in areas with "thriving neighbourhoods with plenty of families" and that the typical customer had "average or above" income. In the 2024 UK general election, the Liberal Democrats successfully targeted traditionally Conservative constituencies with middle-class i.e. affluent voters who might frequent a Gail's, using the question "Does it have a Gail's?".

== Offering ==
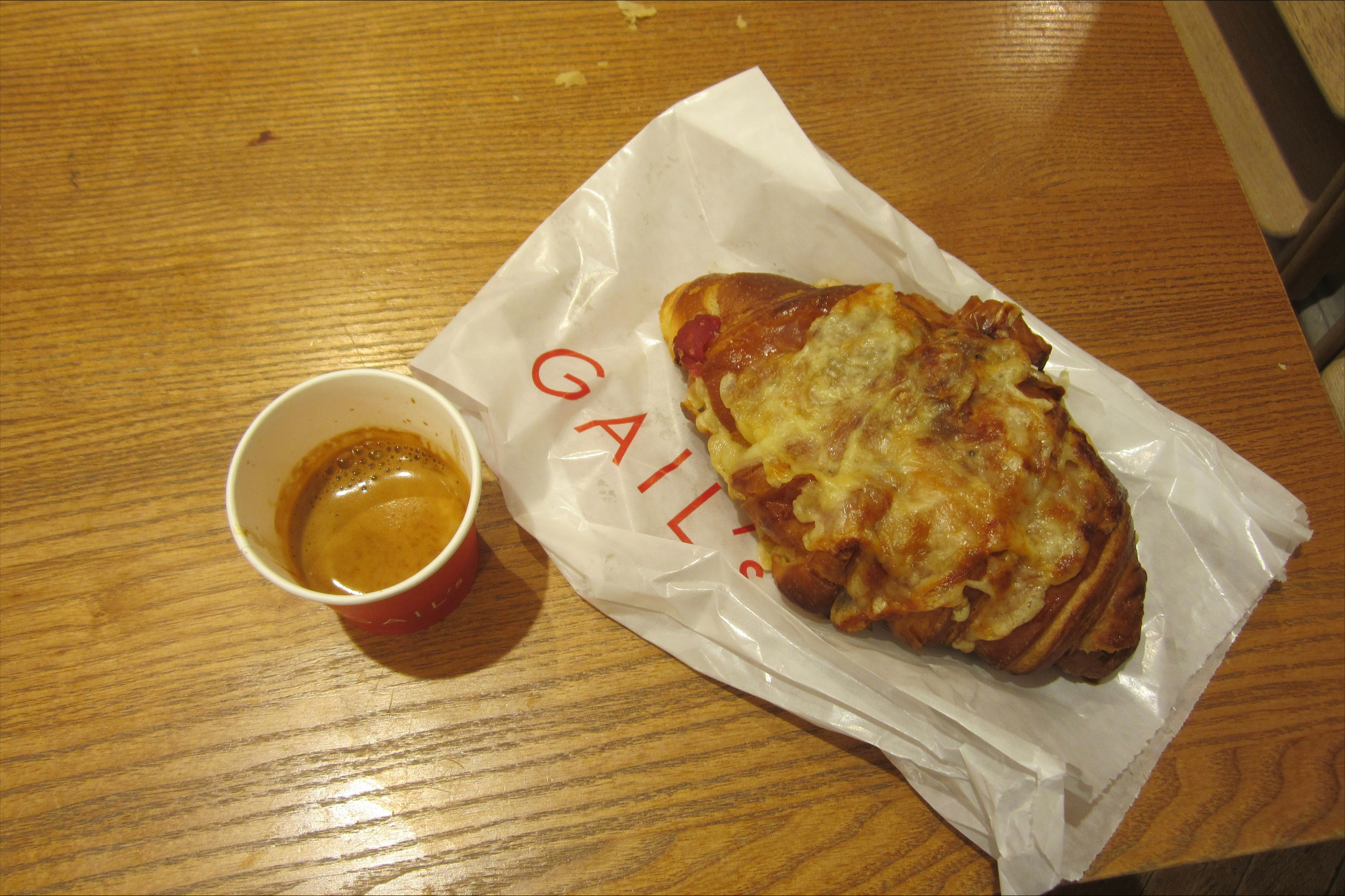
Espresso and a ham and cheese croissant

Gail's is an upmarket coffee shop chain that offers baked products including croissants and cinnamon buns. It uses packaging and branding designed to feel "authentic" and "local", and is associated with more affluent areas.

In August 2024, Gail's attracted criticism for the cost of its leftover "twice-baked" chocolate and almond and almond croissants, £1 more than its fresh croissants. Gail's markets its twice-baked pastries as part of the "Waste Not" range, with the objective being to combat food waste. Some users noted that almond croissants are typically made from old croissants. Gail's has launched various initiatives to reduce food waste, such as selling a sourdough loaf made partially from leftover bread. It partnered with Neighbourly to distribute surplus food in 2023.

In May 2026, Gail's was criticised for the salt content of its smoked chicken Caesar club, reported to contain more salt than an adult's recommended daily amount. The sandwich was also found to contain over 1,000 kilocalories (4,200 kilojoules) of food energy and 90% of an adult's recommended daily saturated fat intake.

In a 2026 survey of flat white coffees from 13 coffee shop chains in the UK, Gail's was the highest in price.

== Opposition ==
Luke Johnson, who oversaw Gail's expansion and sale to Bain Capital, supported Brexit and criticised the COVID-19 lockdowns and net-zero initiatives, attracting boycotts of Gail's.

In August 2024, a petition objected to Gail’s opening in Walthamstow Village as a threat to independents, although some residents welcomed it. In February 2026, a newly opened branch in Archway, London had its windows smashed and was daubed with "reject corporate Zionism" and "Support local businesses". Its opening near the small, independent and Palestinian-owned Café Metro prompted a Guardian opinion piece by Jonathan Liew framing its opening and that of nearby branches of other large chains as accelerating gentrification and "heavy-handed high-street aggression". This drew accusations of antisemitism from politicians such as Kemi Badenoch and a pro-Israel counter-protest of cake deliveries to The Guardian's offices.
