= Strada =

UK restaurant chain

Various Eateries Trading Limited
- Trade name: Strada
- Formerly: Strada Trading Limited (2014–2020)
- Company type: Private
- Industry: Restaurant
- Founded: 2000
- Headquarters: London, England
- Parent: Sun Capital Partners
- Website: strada.co.uk

Previous logo

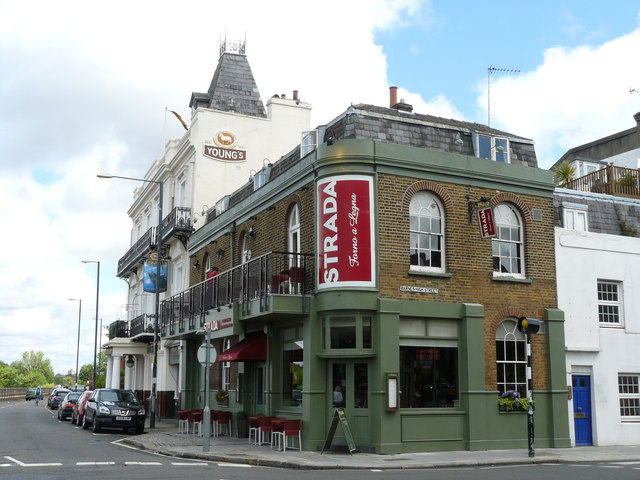
Strada, Barnes, London

Various Eateries Trading Limited, trading as Strada, is a chain based in the United Kingdom of branded restaurants specialising in Italian cuisine with two Strada sites and six Coppa Clubs, all in Southern England.

== History ==
The concept was spawned by Luke Johnson in 2000 and, over five years, expanded to thirty restaurants. In September 2005, Richard Caring bought the chain from Johnson for £60m.

During this period of ownership, twenty more restaurants were added to the chain and, in May 2007 they, along with five Belgo and Bierodrome restaurants, were acquired by Tragus Group Ltd for £140m, owner of the brands Cafe Rouge, Bella Italia, Potters Bar & Kitchen and Huxleys.

In 2007 Targus signed a concession agreement with holiday park operator Center Parcs UK and Ireland This led to the opening of Strada Restaurants at the Company’s Sherwood and Longleat sites and was Expanded in 2014 with the opening of a Strada Restaurant at Center parcs new village in Woburn. Following Strada’s sale in 2014 CDG operated the Center parcs sites as legacy restaurants until 2016 when they were rebranded as Bella Italia. The Woburn site continued to operate as Strada until 2020, when it closed and was rebranded as a new concept restaurant called Amalfi.

In September 2012, Strada joined the Nectar loyalty card reward scheme as a redemption partner. In July 2013, Strada began a partnership with the Gourmet Society, offering their members discounts on production of a Gourmet Society restaurant discount card.

In September 2014, forty three of Strada restaurants were bought by Hugh Osmond's Sun Capital Partners from Tragus Group (renamed Casual Dining Group) for £37m, retaining their existing management team, led by James Spragg. In 2017, over twenty restaurants closed, in turn, many other branded restaurant companies also closed many sites in 2017 and 2018.

As of June 2026, Strada has one site in London Southbank and thirteen Coppa club sites (with two sites of Strada turning into one Coppa Club).

== Charity ==
In March 2013, Strada were official partners of Comic Relief, the British charity founded in 1985 that aims to "bring about positive and lasting change in the lives of poor and disadvantaged people."

== Tipping and minimum wage ==
In June 2009, the company was found to be threatening to dismiss wait staff who do not get customers to pay tips on credit cards rather than in cash. Credit card tips were used by the company to subsidise wages (which are usually the legal minimum) whereas cash tips go directly to wait staff.

In line with changes to tipping legislation, which came into effect on 1 October 2009, Tragus Ltd. reviewed and updated its policies to ensure that all tips, after a 10% deduction for administrative and other costs paid by credit or debit card, are now distributed through the payroll system to restaurant staff. All Tragus Group employees are now paid tips in addition to the National Minimum Wage.

== See also ==
- Bella Italia
- Café Rouge
- Belgo
