= Simpson Travel =

British tour operator

- Industry: Travel
- Key people: Graham Simpson
- Website: official website

Simpson Travel is a British tour operator that specialises in luxury villa holidays and boutique hotel stays.

== History ==
Graham Simpson founded the company in 2002 and became its managing director in 2008. He managed the company alongside his sons, Mathew and Daniel.

In 2025, the company sought to keep all its customers safe by signing the safer tourism pledge.

The company raised £ 1.6 million through a share offer campaign in June 2021. The campaign gave its customers a 10 per cent stake in the firm. The company reported sales of £32.7M for the year ending October 2023. Risk Capital Partners purchased a 50 per cent stake in the business in 2024.

Graham Simpson resigned as managing director in 2024. Former operations director Ed Pyke took over as managing director to lead the company, alongside Mathew and Daniel Simpson.

The organisation operates in several European and Mediterranean territories, including mainland France, Corsica, Mallorca, Italy, Greece, Portugal, and Turkey.

It inspects all holiday residences in its portfolio.

British writer Rachel Joyce booked a one-week holiday with the travel provider in March 2021.
