= Turtle Boy =

Turtle Boy or Turtleboy may refer to:

- Turtle Boy, nickname of the statue of a young boy riding a turtle on the Burnside Fountain in Worcester, Massachusetts, U.S.
- Turtle Boy, a persona of DC Comics character Jimmy Olsen
- "Turtleboy", a 2022 episode of the Australian cartoon Bluey
- Turtleboy, a pen name of American journalist and blogger Aidan Kearney

== See also ==
- Tortoise Boy, a stage play by American-Canadian writer Charles Tidler
- Turtle Bay (disambiguation)
