= The Big Table Group =

British restaurant group

The Big Table Group Limited
- Type: Private
- Industry: Hospitality
- Founded: 2014; 12 years ago
- Headquarters: London, England
- Area served: United Kingdom
- Key people: Rooney Anand, non-executive chairman James Spragg, CEO
- Owner: Epiris
- Website: www.bigtablegroup.com

The Big Table Group Limited, formerly Tragus Group and Casual Dining Group (CDG), is a hospitality company in the United Kingdom. The Big Table operates restaurants primarily under the Bella Italia, Café Rouge, Frankie & Benny's and Las Iguanas names. It also operates sites under the Banana Tree, Chiquito, Coast to Coast, Firejacks and Filling Station brands. It is owned by Epiris.

In mid-May 2020, CDG warned its chains were at risk of going into administration but was later in talks with "multiple parties" about a sale of the business. On 2 July 2020, it was announced that the company had been placed into administration, with 91 outlets set to close with the loss of 1,900 jobs.

Epiris brought CDG out of administration in August 2020, renaming it to The Big Table Group.

== History ==
=== Tragus Group ===
Tragus Holdings was formed in 2002 when Whitbread sold-off 153 failing restaurants from its Pelican and BrightReasons divisions, shortly after writing their value down by £147m. At the time, the two restaurant divisions comprised the Café Rouge, Bella Pasta, Mamma Amalfi, Abbaye, Leadenhall Wine Bar and Oriel brands.

A £25m management buy-in by Tragus Holdings was funded by £11m from venture capitalist speculators ECI Partners. Tragus Holdings was led by chief executive Finlay Scott, formerly head of the Aroma Café chain and Whitecross Dental Care. The team included Gavin Williams, managing director of Bella Pasta, and Harry Morley, former finance director of Whitecross Dental Care.

In January 2005, Tragus' directors sold the company to Legal & General for £90m-£95m. The sale made them around £18m profit. The chairman, discredited former LSE CEO Gavin Casey, received £2m. Legal & General installed a new management team which included appointing new chief executive Graham Turner (formerly managing director of the Unique Pub Company).

In December 2006, Tragus was bought by Blackstone Group for £267m. By that time, the business had grown to 163 restaurants. In September 2006 it had also announced plans for a new restaurant concept - Huxley's Bar & Kitchen – to open in the new Heathrow Terminal 5 in March 2008.

The group expanded rapidly in 2007 with the purchase of Ma Potters restaurant company in February for £14.15m, and the Strada chain - which included five Belgo and Bierodrome restaurants - in May for £140m. In July, Tragus signed a deal with Center Parcs to operate several Bella Italia and Café Rouge restaurants in the leisure village operator's UK sites.

In April 2012 it was announced that Graham Turner would step down as Tragus chief executive. John Derkach, formerly managing director of the Costa Coffee chain took up the position in August 2012.

In early 2014, Blackstone's stake in Tragus was acquired by US investor Apollo Global Management, and, in June 2014, Apollo sought to shed or restructure some of Tragus Group's rent obligations at Cafe Rouge and Bella Italia, and to sell its Strada chain. In September 2014, Tragus sold Strada to Sun Capital Partners.

=== Casual Dining Group ===
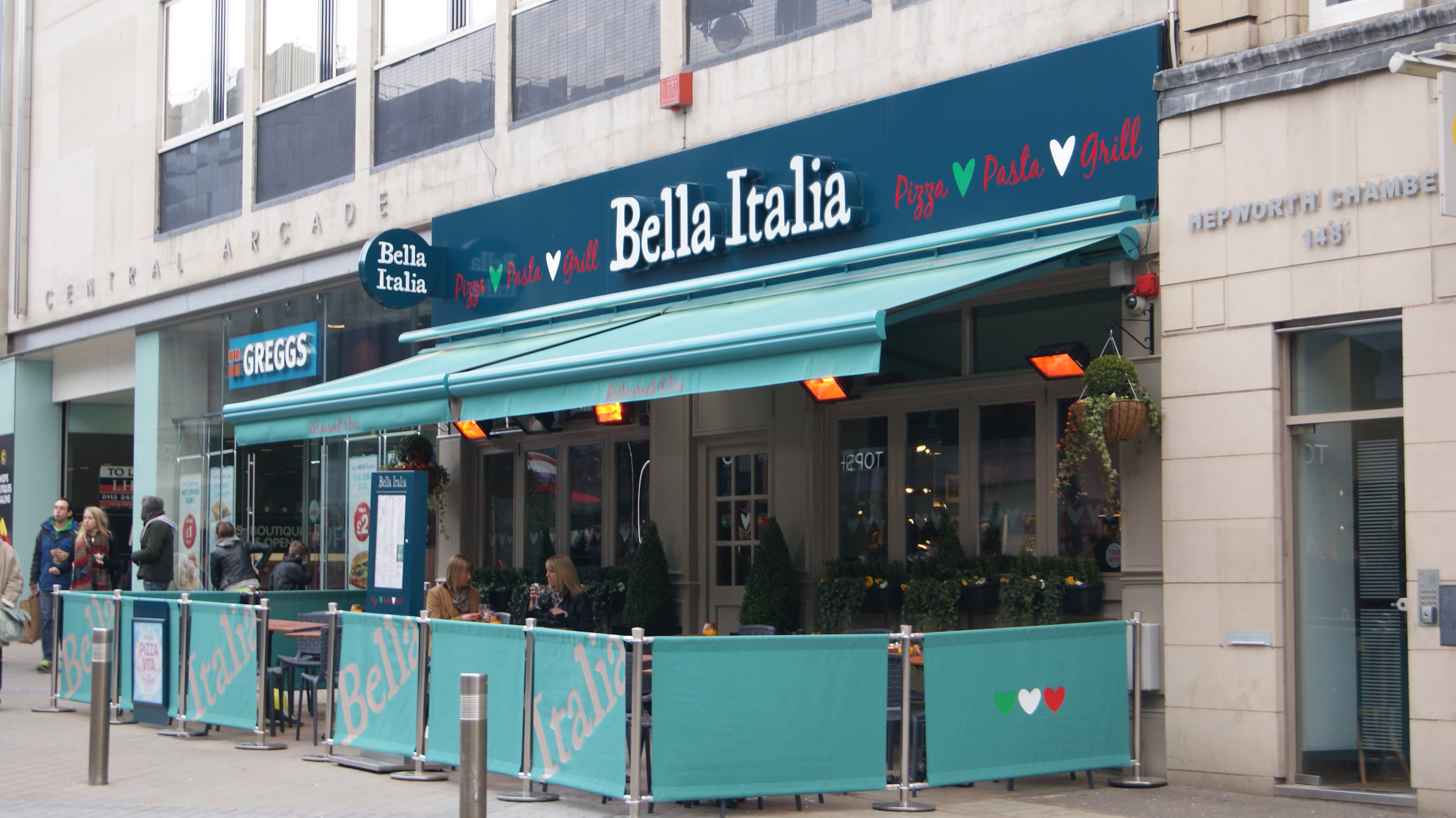
Bella Italia on Briggate in Leeds. Bella Italia is one of The Big Table's brands.

In March 2015, Tragus Holdings rebranded as Casual Dining Group (CDG). In July 2015, CDG acquired Las Iguanas and later went on to purchase La Tasca. CDG also opened concessions including Bella Italia, Café Rouge and Las Iguanas restaurants at Centre Parcs villages, and in UK airports, including Gatwick, Heathrow, Jersey and Inverness.

However, efforts to close loss-making outlets and stem group losses continued through to 2018. Also in 2018, Apollo sold its stake in the group to KKR and Pemberton Capital Advisors (the two had provided loan finance since 2015). Some La Tasca restaurants were converted to other brands, and the remaining four La Tasca restaurants were sold in February 2020.

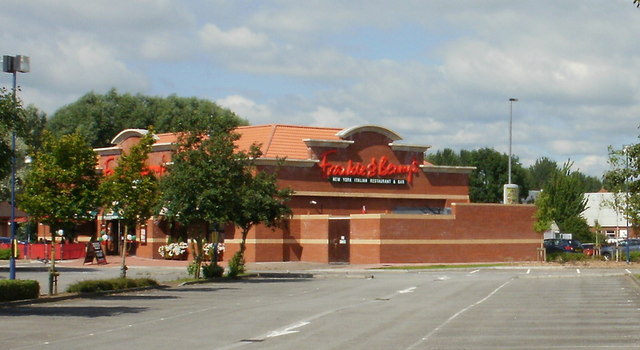
Frankie & Benny's in Newport, Wales. The Big Table bought the chain in 2023.

On 18 May 2020, during the COVID-19 pandemic, CDG announced that it was working with advisors on next steps for the business as a prudent measure to protect the company whilst planning for the future. Media reports suggested the group was preparing to place one of its three core brands into administration as part of a financial restructuring of the business. On 29 May, CDG was reportedly in talks with "multiple parties", including other restaurant groups and private equity firms, over a sale of the business, potentially saving 6,000 jobs.

On 2 July 2020, it was announced that the company had been placed into administration, with 91 outlets set to close, with the loss of 1,900 jobs, leaving the group with 159 operational restaurants. They appointed AlixPartners to deal with the administration and said that the 91 outlets would be permanently shut as no buyers were offering to acquire them.

=== The Big Table ===
On 3 August 2020, it was announced that Casual Dining Group, including the Las Iguanas, Bella Italia and Café Rouge restaurants, had been acquired out of administration by private equity firm Epiris and rebranded as The Big Table, led by the existing management team under CEO James Spragg.

In 2023, The Big Table bought most of The Restaurant Group's loss-making assets for £7.5 million.

== Social responsibility ==
CDG claimed to emphasise corporate social responsibility practices. It reduced its energy consumption by 17% from 2012 to 2016, and had a partnership with The Prince's Trust charity.

Some CDG brands ranked highly for seafood sustainability (within their class). All whole eggs sourced by the company for its kitchens were free-range together with eggs used as ingredients for sauces and pasta. In 2016, in partnership with Compassion in World Farming, CDG said it aimed to use solely free-range eggs as ingredients by 2025. In 2019, CDG signed up to the European Chicken Commitment to improve chicken welfare.

CDG had a partnership with UK charity FareShare to redistribute food that would go to waste to people in need instead.

== Controversy ==
In 2009 Tragus was the subject of newspaper reports highlighting the practice of several UK restaurant chains using customer tips to meet minimum wage laws for waiters/waitresses. The company's business model was said to depend on paying servers as little as £2.50 an hour, with the rest coming as tips. The company reportedly instructed restaurant managers to pressure servers to avoid encouraging customers to give tips in cash, which would not count as part of wages, and was threatening to sack employees who failed to produce a sufficient volume of card-based gratuities. They were discovered (via "mystery diners") informing customers of the company's policy. When the practice became unlawful on 1 October 2009, Tragus reviewed and updated its policies to ensure that all tips, after a 10% deduction for administrative and other costs paid by credit or debit card, were distributed through the payroll system to restaurant staff via a Tronc system.

In 2020, Casual Dining Group policy was that all customer cash tips and service charges were kept by restaurant employees in full. (Note: When tips or service charge are paid for by a credit card or debit card, the company makes a 2.5% administration charge to cover bank fees, before distributing the remainder in full to employees. Tips and service charges are paid in full in addition to the National Minimum Wage and National Living Wage. Any tips paid in cash are retained by the individual waiter. It is the responsibility of those receiving cash tips to declare the income for tax purposes to HM Revenue & Customs.)
