= Grants of Croydon =

Entertainment complex and former department store in Croydon, London

Coordinates: 51°22′23″N 0°6′2″W

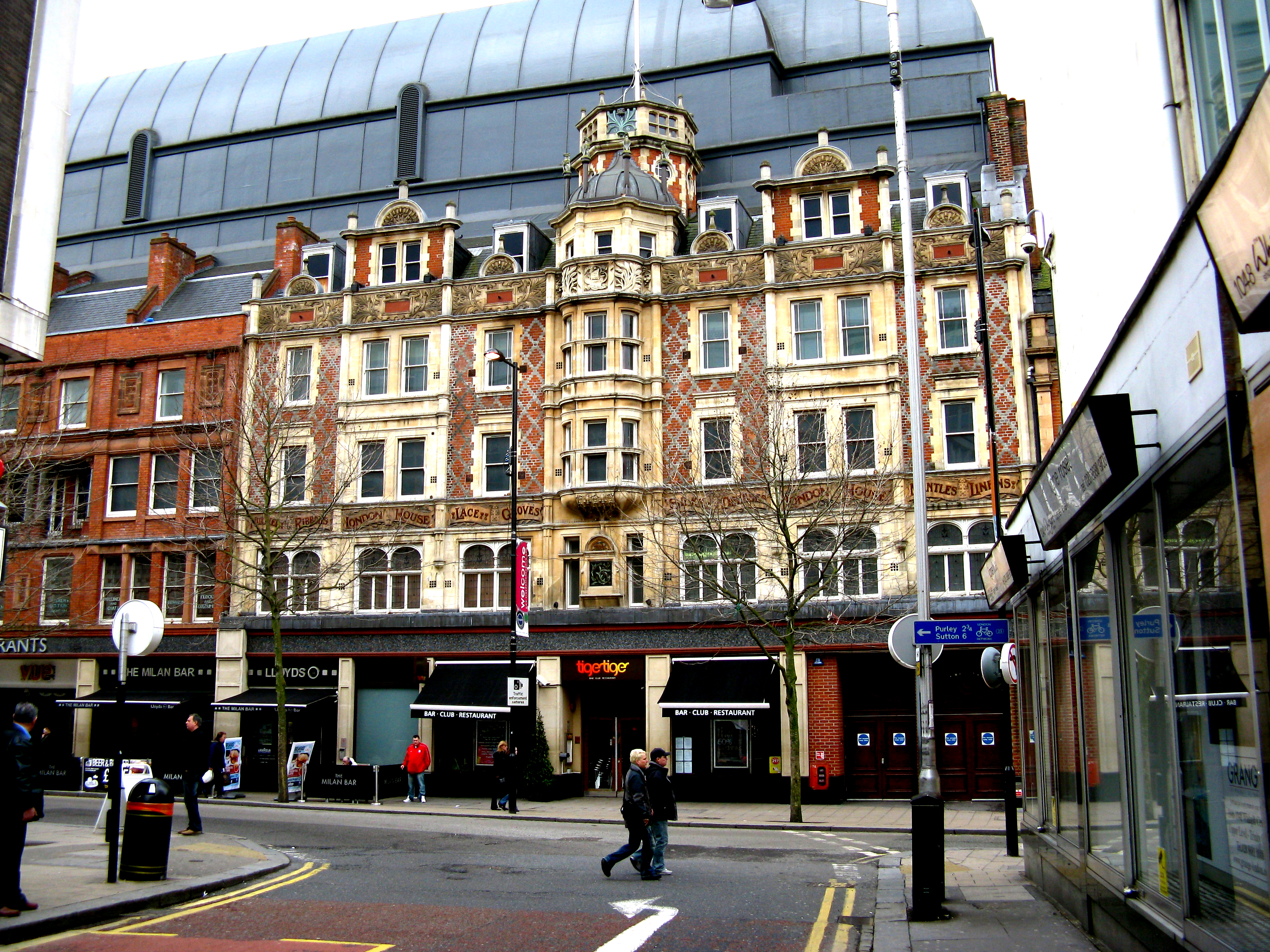
- View of Grants from Park Street

General information
- Current tenants: Nando's, Turtle Bay, Nuffield Health, Vue Cinema
- Construction started: 1895
- Owner: MGI Holdings
- Operator: Jones Lang LaSalle

Grants of Croydon is an entertainment complex at 14–32 High Street, Croydon, London. Originally built in 1894, Grants became a Grade II listed building in 1990. In 2000 Grants was re-developed into an entertainment centre. It was bought by Scottish Widows in early 2010. Grants Entertainment Centre in Croydon is now owned by MGI Holdings, which purchased the property in January 2026 in an off-market deal from Federated Hermes.

== Department store ==
The two Grant brothers originally had a tailor's shop across the road. Business boomed so the brothers bought out the surrounding shops opposite and opened Grants department store. During the First World War years Grants was considered the Harrods of its generation. Croydon was home to the first UK international airport and the store provided all the uniforms for the Royal Air Force. Grants was visited by swarms of French aristocrats who flew into Croydon simply to buy a suit. It was the first store in the UK to have its own generator supplied electricity.

The Royal Family were also frequent visitors to Grants and on occasion the Queen would also come to the store.

After the Second World War times were hard and the store's clothes were considered over-priced. Business became increasingly difficult, and eventually, by the 1980s, stiff competition forced Grants out of business. The store closed its doors in 1985 and remained empty until 2000.

== Reconstruction ==
Developers Richardsons tasked architects Hellmuth, Obata and Kassabaum with the challenge of redeveloping the listed building to its former glory by restoring the original Queen Anne style façade. The restoration include repair of the stained glass windows, the stonework, the cornices, the window trims and a turret with a flagpole. The windows of the building are etched as they were in Victorian times, with descriptions of the goods that Grants used to sell, such as 'haberdashery' and 'silks'.

== Current tenants ==
Although the exterior has been restored to its former glory, the environment inside is very different. The tenants are:

- Nando's, a casual dining restaurant.
- Turtle Bay restaurant chain.
- Nuffield Health, a health club and gym.
- Vue Cinema, is situated on the top three floors of Grants. It has ten screens, including a RealD Cinema screen.

Previous tenants have included Reflex (later Luna), and Lloyd's Milan Bar, part of the J D Wetherspoon chain. The Turtle Bay was previously a Tiger Tiger.

In 2024 the former Wetherspoons was the venue for an exhibition by artist Hetain Patel and Artangel.
