= PB Devco =

UK bar and restaurant operation firm

PB Development Company
- Trade name: PB Devco
- Industry: Hospitality
- Founded: 1986
- Founder: Stuart Clarkson
- Headquarters: Aberdeen, Scotland
- Website: pbdevco.com

PB Devco (full name PB Development Company) is a firm which operates bars and restaurants in Aberdeen, UK.

== History ==
The company was founded by Stuart Clarkson in 1986.

In May 2017, the company donated £20,000 to the Conservative Party.

In January 2018, Paul Clarkson, a director at the firm, suggested that some beggars in Aberdeen were begging as a "lifestyle choice" and that they should "consider whether they could be contributing to society more positively". He went on to state that some positions such as glass collecting are unskilled, and beggars should approach his businesses for a job.

The firm closed all its venues after 16 March 2020 due to the COVID-19 pandemic.

== Venues ==
The company owns the following venues:

- College Bar
- The Bieldside, acquired from Signature Pub Group in 2011
- The Howff, a pub. In August 2021, it was announced that the adjacent The Draft Project would be combined with The Howff and both would be counted as a single venue.
- The Queen Vic, a bar on Rosemount Street
- So...
- Soul, a bar and nightclub
- Vovem, a restaurant, with an exclusive "speakeasy", 21 Crimes, in its basement. Opened in 2018 in a building previously occupied by a Filling Station restaurant.

== Controversy ==
In August 2020, the firm opened "The Draft Project" in a disused area of land previously occupied by Bruce Millers music shop. Described as a "pop-up bar", it was expected to operate for around two months. It was later discovered that Aberdeen City Council had fast-tracked the license for the venue, before denying that any licenses were processed in such a way. There were also claims that the venue did not meet COVID-19 regulations at the time and that it should be classed as indoors. PB Devco disputed this, stating that the tent housing the venue had more open space than it did walls and thus it was classed as outside.

The firm was criticized in November 2020 after videos were shared online of football fans hugging, singing, and standing on tables while watching the Scotland national football team at the Draft Project venue. Company owner Stuart Clarkson subsequently apologised. The venue was subsequently ordered by the council to remove all of its televisions for 21 days. On 20 November, councillors voted to take no further action.

In 2021, director Paul Clarkson was found to be in possession of over £1,600 of cocaine while at work, which he was selling to fund his own addiction.
