= Langley Grammar School =

Location
- Reddington Drive; Langley; Slough, Berkshire, SL3 7QS; England; 51°29′56″N 0°33′09″W

Information
- Type: Grammar academy
- Motto: Sapientia Domine
- Established: 1956
- Department for Education URN: 136521 Tables
- Ofsted: Reports
- Headteacher: David Harding
- Gender: Co-educational
- Age: 11 to 18
- Enrolment: 1,095
- Houses: Kedemister, Harvey, Robinson, Seymour, Villiers, Clark
- Website: http://www.lgs.slough.sch.uk/page/default.asp?title=Home&pid=1

Langley Grammar School is a co-educational grammar school with academy status, located in Langley, Berkshire, England. It is situated just north of the A4 next to Kedermister Park. Cycle route 61 passes north-south next to the west side of the school .

== Admissions ==
It currently has approximately 1260 pupils of whom 262 are in the sixth form.

Langley Grammar School selects its incoming students on the basis of examined ability, at age 11 by NFER 11+ examination or for sixth form by performance at GCSE and interview. David Harding is the current headteacher of the school, succeeding former headteacher John Constable who held the position for 12 years. Around 70% of pupils come from outside of the LAA, with many from Hillingdon.

== History ==
The school was founded in 1955 by Buckinghamshire County Council; Slough and Langley at that time being in Buckinghamshire. The founding headmaster was J. G. Day. Since 1 April 2011 the school has been an academy trust and a charitable company limited by guarantee registered in England and Wales (registered number 7536795).

In the early 1980s, there were plans to close the school to reduce Slough's grammar schools from 5 to 4. In the end, two single-sex grammar schools merged instead to form Slough Grammar School (now Upton Court Grammar School).

== Facilities ==
Langley Grammar School sold tracts of land at the end of the former school field to fund building and restoration works including, amongst others, a new teaching block of six classrooms, a sports hall, fitness suite, multi-purpose area, and astro-turf pitch. There are also 2 multi-use courts- 1 by the table tennis tables and the 2020 building. The other one is next to the DT food tech and textiles and sixth form centre. On 11 September 2006, the new sports hall was officially opened by the mayor of Slough. A new sixth form center was completed in August 2007, which was opened on 28 September 2007 by Princess Anne.

In 2020, Langley Grammar School finished their old building, called the “New Teaching Block". This, alongside the new sixth form block - the 96 block, the sports center, and the modern foreign languages block make up the main teaching areas within the school. The new building consists of three floors. The ground floor facilitates the DT facilities as well as extra general-purpose classrooms. The first-floor consists of many computer rooms and the second floor is focused on the science part of the curriculum, with many labs in order for students to properly carry out practical activities.

In September 2021, the second new building called the “Front of House Block” opened. This new block contains a large spacious canteen, large library and a main hall with an accompanying dance studio next door.

== Notable former pupils ==
- Daniel Johnson (journalist), editor since 2008 of Standpoint, and son of Paul Johnson
- Luke Johnson, brother of Daniel, and chairman since 2012 of Startup Britain, and from 2004–09 of Channel 4
- Joanne Thompson, olympic medallist (bronze) field hockey goalkeeper for the GB team, 1992 Summer Olympics
- Adam J. Bernard, Olivier Award winning actor for best actor in a supporting role in a musical for his role in Dreamgirls 2017.
- Claire Barratt, English industrial archaeologist, steam engineer and television presenter
