= Deep Pan Pizza =

Chain of British pizza restaurants

Restaurant information
- Closed: March 1998
- Previous owner: City Centre Restaurants

Deep Pan Pizza was a chain of British pizza restaurants, that was best known for its "all-you-can-eat" business model.

At the time its closure was announced in March 1998, there were 89 Deep Pan Pizza restaurants in the UK. The owner of the chain was City Centre Restaurants (now the Restaurant Group). James Naylor, City Centre's chief executive, said, "The brand was becoming dated. Thin crust pizzas are becoming more popular, with fewer people eating deep pan."

City Centre planned to have about 35 sites still selling pizza, another 30 to include other brands such as Caffe Uno, and the rest to be disposed of. City Centre's other brands included Frankie & Benny's, Chiquito, Wok Wok, and Est Est Est. Frankie & Benny's slowly began replacing a number of former restaurants shortly after the Deep Pan Pizza chain disappeared.

The Deep Pan Pizza brand was sold in a management buyout for £3.1 million in 2001.

In 2006, the Restaurant Group (City Centre) bought back the original brand. The current status of the brand is unknown.
