= Luke Johnson (businessman) =

British entrepreneur (born 1962)

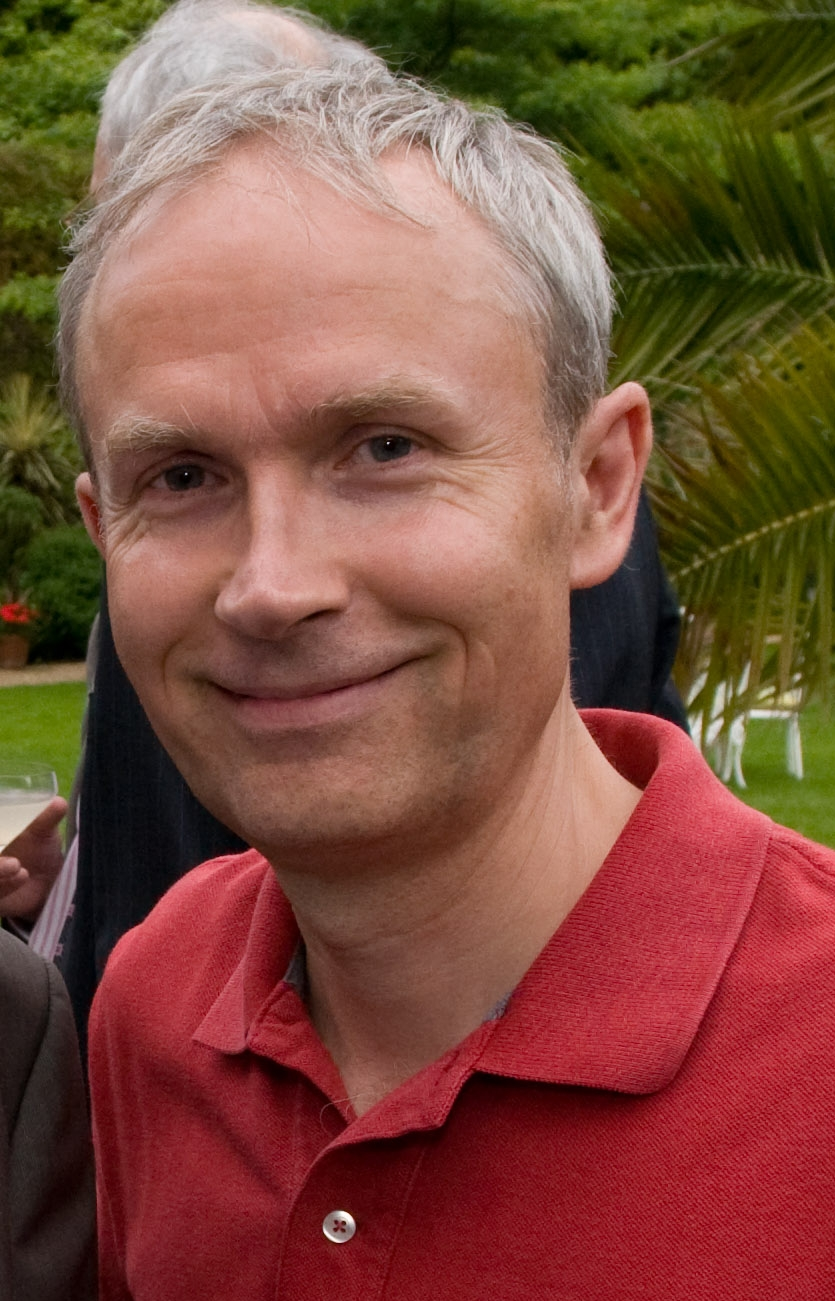
- Johnson in 2011
- Born: Luke Oliver Johnson; 2 February 1962 (age 64); Slough, Buckinghamshire, UK
- Education: Magdalen College, Oxford
- Occupation: Entrepreneur
- Spouse: Liza Johnson
- Children: 3
- Relatives: Daniel Johnson (brother); Paul Johnson (father)
- Website: www.lukejohnson.org

Luke Oliver Johnson (born 2 February 1962) is a British entrepreneur. He is a former chairman of the PizzaExpress chain, the Royal Society of Arts and Channel 4.

Johnson calls himself a "projector", the 17th-century term for a man involved in many different businesses. He is currently the chairman of Gail's bakery and The Brighton Pier Group, among other businesses. He is a former owner of The Ivy, Le Caprice and J Sheekey restaurants in London and a former part-owner of Giraffe Restaurants.

== Early years ==
Luke Johnson was born on 2 February 1962 in Slough, the son of historian Paul Johnson and of Marigold Johnson, and the brother of Daniel Johnson. He spent his early years in Iver, Buckinghamshire, and was educated at the state run Langley Grammar School in Langley, Berkshire, and at Magdalen College, Oxford.

While at university Johnson, together with fellow student Hugh Osmond (later founder of Punch Taverns), interviewed Sir Richard Branson on his houseboat in London for the student newspaper. This gave the pair the inspiration to go into business and they began running the Era nightclub in Oxford. By the time of graduation, he and Osmond were running businesses from software to clubs.

Johnson initially studied medicine but, like Hugh Osmond, only completed the first part of the course, graduating from Oxford University with a BA in Physiological Sciences in 1983. He began his career as a media analyst at stockbroker Grieveson Grant (subsequently Kleinwort Benson Securities).

== Business career ==
=== Patisserie Holdings ===
Johnson is the former executive chairman, chairman of the remuneration committee and shareholder of Patisserie Holdings, which was the ultimate owner of the trading brands Patisserie Valerie, Druckers Vienna Patisserie, Philpotts, Baker & Spice, and Flour Power City Bakery.

On 19 May 2014 the company was admitted to the Alternative Investment Market.

==== Fraud investigation at Patisserie Holdings ====
On 10 October 2018, the company's shares were suspended from trading. An announcement included information that the board had been notified of significant and potentially fraudulent accounting irregularities, that a potential material mis-statement of the company's accounts had significantly impacted the company's cash position, and that Chris Marsh, the chief financial officer, had been suspended from his role. Prior to suspension the business had a market capitalisation of over £500 million.

On 11 October, the company announced that there was a material shortfall between the reported financial status and the current financial status of the business and that without an immediate injection of capital the directors were of the view that there would be no scope for the business to continue trading in its current form. The following day Johnson loaned £10 million to the business, and also provided a £10 million bridging loan to enable the company to execute a share placing, which occurred later the same day.

On 22 January 2019, the firm announced that it had collapsed into administration following failed talks with banks, which the company stated was a "direct result of the significant fraud".

=== Other business ventures ===
Since 2001, Johnson has run Risk Capital Partners Ltd, focusing on private equity deals. Risk Capital Partner's portfolio includes the directory publisher Superbrands, fashion chain East, and GRA, the UK's largest greyhound track owner. East went into administration in January 2018.

In May 2010, Johnson became a strategic investor in Beer & Partners, the UK's largest business investment agency. He is also a director of two theatre production partnerships, Playful Productions and Fiery Dragons, as well as director of AKA UK, a marketing agency to the live entertainment industry. In October 2011, Johnson became a non-executive director of Metro Bank plc. He was a non-executive director of art publisher Phaidon Press from August 2010 to October 2012.

=== Former investments ===
In 1996 Johnson co-founded Integrated Dental Holdings, expanding it to become the UK's largest chain of dental surgeries, with over 500 dentists. The firm was sold in 2006 for over £100 million. From 2004 to 2006 Johnson was director of Dollar Financial Group Inc, a US NASDAQ traded corporation with $80m EBITDA. He was involved in parcel delivery and maritime commerce through Nightfreight and American Port Services.

He served as a non-executive director of Elderstreet VCT plc for ten years. Through Risk Capital Partners, Johnson was a founder, part-owner and director of recruitment business InterQuest Group plc. Risk Capital Partners is also a former investor in advertising and design group Loewy, which was sold in 2006, and formerly a part-owner of fresh fish distributor Seafood Holdings, sold in 2010 for £45m in total. Risk also held a stake in car park technology provider APT controls until 2014.

In February 2013 Johnson became an investor and shareholder in retro confectionery retailers Hope and Greenwood, later selling the intellectual property of the brand to Honeycomb Project Management when Hope and Greenwood entered into administration in 2015.

Luke Johnson became chairman and part-owner of Giraffe Restaurants in 2004. In 2013 he stepped down as chairman, upon Giraffe's sale to Tesco for a reported £50m.

=== Restaurants and leisure ===
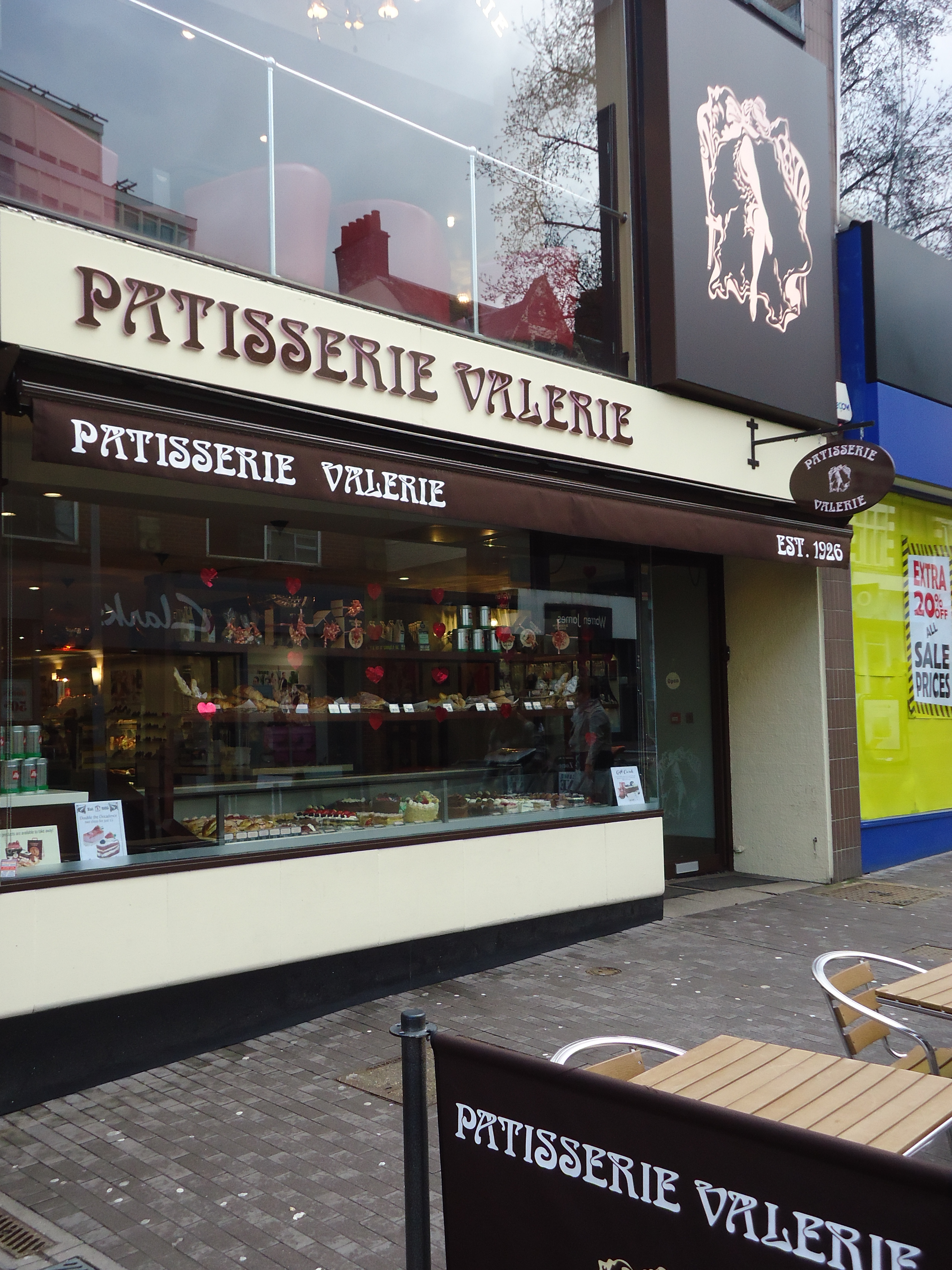
A Patisserie Valerie store in Sutton High Street, Sutton, Greater London

In 1993, Johnson and Osmond took control of Pizza Express, with Johnson becoming chairman. They expanded the business from 12 owned restaurants to over 250, and the share price from 40p to over 900p. After selling the business in 1999 Johnson started Signature Restaurants, a ‘crown jewels’ collection of London restaurants which included The Ivy and Le Caprice, as well as the Belgo chain. He also started Strada restaurants from scratch, taking the chain to 30 units. He sold both businesses in 2005; the total proceeds from these two disposals were in excess of £90 million.

Whilst chairman of the Belgo group, Johnson took part in the BBC programme "Back to the Floor", a programme in which top executives spent a week at the "coal face" of their business. After being confronted during filming about low wages, Johnson stormed off the show, unwilling to listen to or act on criticism from employees about poor working conditions.

From 1993 to date, Johnson has been involved as director and/or owner of various companies in retailing, pubs and bars, including Whittard of Chelsea, My Kinda Town and the private companies Giraffe, Druckers and Baker & Spice. The latter two businesses became part of Patisserie Holdings. In December 2009, Johnson's investment partnership Risk Capital Partners Ltd acquired the Tootsie's restaurant chain, for which it was awarded the "Deal of the Year" prize at the 2010 Retailer's Retailer Awards ceremony. Johnson also purchased in 2010 a stake in artisan bakery Flour Power City, which supplies restaurants, hotels, and caterers. Flour Power City also operates stalls in locations such as Borough Market in London. This business also became part of Patisserie Holdings.

September 2010 saw Johnson purchase Feng Sushi, a London-based chain of Japanese restaurants specialising in home delivery. In the same month he also purchased a majority stake in casual-dining firm Ego Group, which was merged in April 2011 with pizza business Rocket Restaurants to form 3Sixty Restaurants, with Johnson as chairman.

In May 2011, Risk Capital Partners assumed a shareholding in Bread Ltd. The group includes retail bakery and cafe Gail's, which has twenty-two bakeries in London and sells its products through Waitrose, Harvey Nichols and Ocado. In June 2013 he became chairman and 50% owner of Grand Union, a London bar chain.

Johnson is also the majority owner of contract catering firm Genuine Dining.

In May 2015, Risk Capital Partners announced its purchase of a majority stake in Zoggs, the global swimming products brand. In June 2015, Johnson invested £1.5 million into the Eclectic Bar Group and became its executive chairman.

In 2016 he acquired a 12.5% stake in Elegant Hotels Group. He joined the board of Elegant Hotels as a non-executive director in May 2017.

In November 2019, it was revealed that Johnson had hired bankers to prepare the sale of Gail's.

== Business approach ==
Among Johnson's business maxims are that, consciously or not, every successful company that he knows has followed kaizen, the Japanese management philosophy of constant, incremental improvements, often driven from the bottom up.

== Politics ==
Johnson supported Brexit and backed the Vote Leave campaign group in the 2016 United Kingdom European Union membership referendum. Johnson has described the government's response to COVID-19 as "a campaign of fear" and in November 2020 Risk Capital Partners funded a media consultant for the COVID Recovery Group of anti-lockdown MPs.

== Journalism and media ==
Johnson was chairman of Channel 4 Television Corporation from January 2004 to January 2010, during which time he appointed a new CEO, restructured the board and saw the organisation enjoy record ratings, revenues and surplus.

Johnson wrote a weekly column on business for The Sunday Times between 2015 and 2021. He wrote a weekly essay for the Financial Times from 2007 to 2015. From 1998 to 2006 he wrote "The Maverick", a weekly business column for The Sunday Telegraph. An anthology of "The Maverick" columns was published by Harriman House in 2007. Johnson wrote “Start It Up: Why Running Your Own Business Is Easier Than You Think”, published by Penguin in 2011. Johnson co-wrote with Graeme Boyd “Throwing Parties: A Guide to Being a Great Host”, published by John Wilkes Publishing in 2024. Johnson is also a former columnist for Management Today.

Johnson served on the advisory board of defunct cultural and political magazine Standpoint.

== Other activities ==
Johnson was appointed Chair of the Almeida Theatre in Islington, London in 2016.

Johnson is the former chairman of the Institute of Cancer Research, assuming that role in August 2013 and standing down in August 2021.

He is a former chairman of the Royal Society of Arts, completing a three-year term in October 2012. He was governor of The University of the Arts between 2000 and 2006. He was also chairman of Action on Addiction from 2011 to 2012. In June 2012, Johnson was appointed chairman of Startup Britain, the national campaign to stimulate start-up growth in the UK. Johnson is also chairman of Career Colleges, an organisation planning 40 vocational colleges for 14- to 19-year-olds.

In October 2013, Johnson co-founded and launched the Centre for Entrepreneurs, a non-profit think-tank aiming to address the "...under-representation of entrepreneurs in the public eye" and to "...promote entrepreneurship to government, media, the private sector (including big businesses) and the general public."

Johnson is a former chairman of StageOne, a charity in support of new producers of quality commercial theatre.

With Stephen Lambert and Christopher Hird, Johnson co-produced The Flaw, a 2011 documentary film detailing the events leading up to the financial crash of 2008. The film takes its title from Alan Greenspan's admission to US Congress that he had been mistaken to put so much faith in the self-correcting power of free markets.

== Personal life ==
Johnson holds honorary degrees from Heriot-Watt University, the University of Bath, the University of the West of England and the University of West London.

Johnson is married to Liza. They have three children and live in London.

== Publications ==
- Throwing Parties: A Guide to Being a Great Host – ISBN 978-1-7390926-0-3
- Start It Up: Why Running Your Own Business is Easier Than You Think – ISBN 978-0-670-92047-1
- The Maverick – ISBN 978-1-905641-40-6
- Betting to Win – ISBN 0-948035-31-5
- The Key to Making Money in the New Stock Market – ISBN 0-297-79296-2
- How to get a Highly Paid Job in the City – ISBN 1-85091-474-5
- 30 Ways to Make Money in Franchising – ISBN 0-948032-48-0
- 30 Ways to Make Money in Property – ISBN 0-948032-43-X

Media offices
Preceded by Vanni Treves	Chairman of Channel 4 January 2004 – January 2010	Succeeded by Terence Burns
