= Turtle Bay =

Turtle Bay may refer to:

- Turtle Bay, Manhattan, a neighborhood in New York City
- Turtle Bay, O'ahu, in the Hawaiian archipelago
- Turtle Bay, Bermuda, bay in Bermuda
- Turtle Bay, U.S. Virgin Islands, bay and beach in U.S. Virgin Islands
- Turtle Bay, Texas, a former area of Galveston Bay now enclosed as Lake Anahuac
- Turtle Bay (album), a 1973 album by Herbie Mann
- Turtle Bay Exploration Park in Redding, California
- Turtle Bay (restaurant), a chain of Caribbean-themed restaurants in the United Kingdom
