= Risk Capital Partners =

British private equity firm

Risk Capital Partners LLP
- Company type: Private
- Industry: Finance
- Founded: London, United Kingdom (2001)
- Area served: Firms located in the UK only
- Key people: Luke Johnson, Ben Redmond, Michael Simmonds
- Services: Private equity funds, Leveraged buyouts, Growth capital, Management buy-in funding
- Number of employees: 6
- Website: www.riskcapitalpartners.co.uk

Risk Capital Partners LLP is a London-based private equity firm, co-founded in 2001 by Ben Redmond and Luke Johnson. The firm invests in numerous sectors, including leisure, retail, media, healthcare, IT services, financial services and support services.

== Investment profile ==
Risk Capital Partners mainly provides growth capital investment, taking minority or majority positions in established, profitable, mid-market UK companies and typically contributing £3-£15 million per investment.

The firm is currently investing a ten-year £75m fund on behalf of pension funds, life companies and specialist fund investors, including £25m provided by Risk Capital's own partners. The firm has participated in a range of investment situations, including development capital for organic growth, management buyouts, shareholder restructuring, company turnarounds and the acquisition/de-listing of public companies.

== Current investments ==
- Curious Brewing - acquired in March 2021 after company put into administration.
- Gail's - retail bakery and cafe chain
- Neilson Active Holidays - Activity holiday provider bought from Thomas Cook in 2013
- Superbrands - media and publishing
- Synarbor - educational recruitment
- The Bread Factory - wholesale artisan bakery
- Tile Depot - retailer of floor and wall tiles

== Former investments ==
Investment	Exited	Company Description	Ref.
Greyhound Racing Association	2019	Risk Capital Partners (with Galliard Homes) bought the GRA for £50.3 million. Company dissolved in 2019.
Giraffe	2013	In 2004 Risk Capital Partners provided development capital to accelerate the expansion of the Giraffe family-restaurant chain. Giraffe was sold to supermarket chain Tesco in March 2013 for a multiple of 8x RCP's original valuation.
East	2012	Risk Capital Partners invested in ladies fashion retailer East as part of a consortium which took a 50% stake in the company; Risk Capital completed the sale of its stake in 2012 for 1x cost.
Interquest Group	2010	Risk Capital Partners backed the founder in 2001 with development capital to support the acquisition of a series of businesses in the IT recruitment sector, before selling its shares in 2010 and realising a return on investment of 2.8x.
Seafood Holdings	2010	In 2006 Risk Capital Partners funded Seafood Holdings' acquisition drive to build a national distribution capacity. During the firm’s investment, Seafood Holdings made eight acquisitions and grew revenue from £35 million to £80 million. In 2010 the business was sold to Bidvest for £45 million.
Integrated Dental Holdings	2006	In 2004 Risk Capital Partners funded a take-private deal of the AIM-listed Integrated Dental Holdings, prior to a management buy-out in 2006. The MBO realised a IRR of over 400% and an overall return of 10x.
Loewy Group	2006	Marketing services group Loewy was backed by RCP in 2004 further to a series of acquisitions of PR, research, design and branding companies. These combined upon exit to achieve a cash multiple of 2.5x and an IRR of 43%.
Mayfair Bingo	2006	RCP funded the 2004 management buy-out of Mayfair Bingo (trading as Riva Bingo halls). The business was sold in April 2006 to Hermes Private Equity, realising a return of 2.3x and an IRR of 59%.
Signature Restaurants	2005	Risk Capital Partners funded the public-to-private of Signature Restaurants, the owner of a number of London restaurants including The Ivy and Le Caprice. During this time management also created the Strada pizza restaurant brand. Signature was sold in 2005, realising a 7.7x return on equity.

== Politics ==
In November 2020 the group funded a media consultant for the COVID Recovery Group of anti-lockdown MPs.

== Criticism ==
In 2005 Risk Capital Partners acquired the Greyhound Racing Association It later emerged that the purchase was part-financed by property developer Galliard Homes and GRA faced a £49 million debt. The company was later dissolved following the disposal of its assets.

== See also ==
- Luke Johnson (businessman)
