= Food & Fuel Pubs =

Pub in London, England

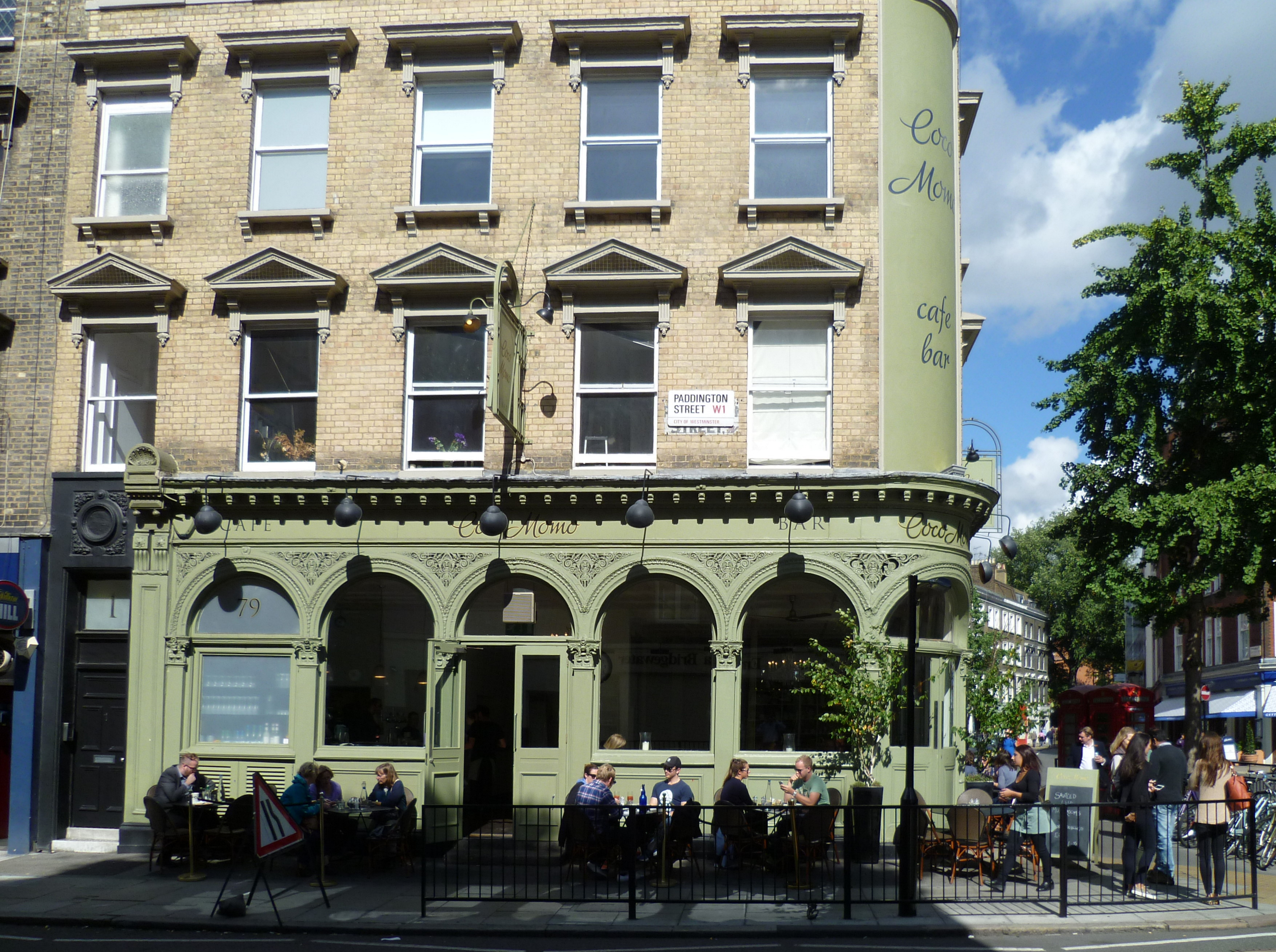
Coco Momo, Marylebone High Street; formerly, a Food & Fuel public house

Food & Fuel Pubs was a small, independent gastropub and cafe bar chain in London. The firm was established in June 2006, when it bought five pubs from Punch Taverns. It ran eleven sites in Central and West London, including Richmond, Chiswick, Pimlico, Marylebone, Kensington and Chelsea.

The firm was co-founded by Karen Jones, former chief executive of Spirit Group, which was later purchased by Punch Taverns, and Jo Cumming and Peter Myers.

In August 2018, the 11-strong portfolio, which included two Coco Momo wine bars, was purchased by the Brunning & Price division of The Restaurant Group for £15.4 million. Brunning & Price now operates 12 pubs under the "Food & Fuel" banner, which are predominantly located in central London.
