= Frankie & Benny's =

British restaurant chain

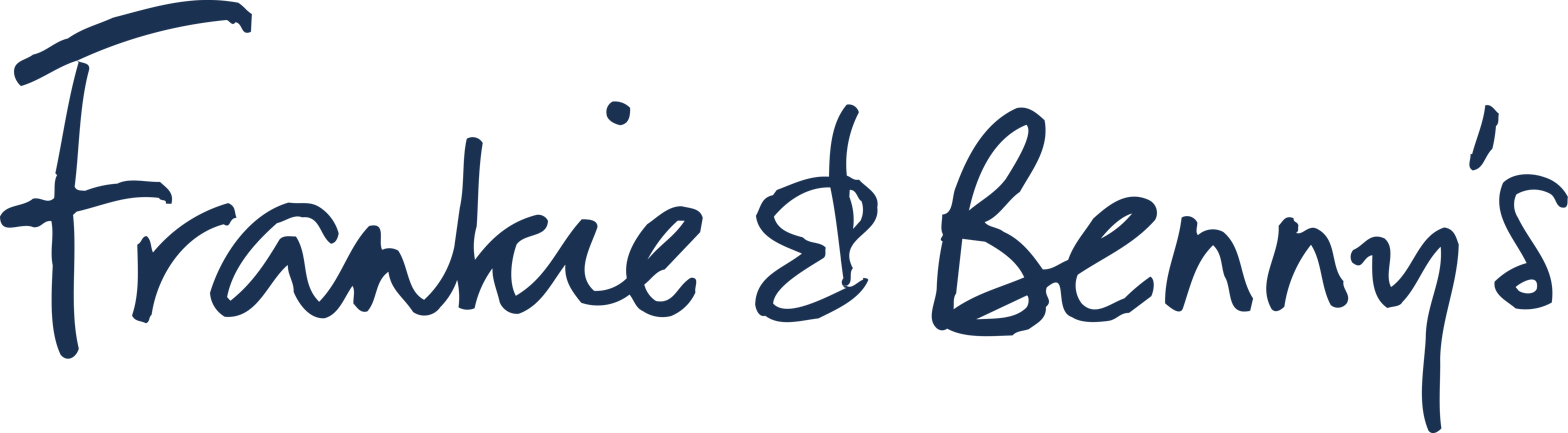
- Type: New York-Italian 1950s themed restaurant chain
- Founded: 1995; 31 years ago
- Founder: The Restaurant Group
- Headquarters: London, England
- Owner: The Restaurant Group; (1995–2023); The Big Table; (2023–present)
- Website: frankieandbennys.com

Frankie & Benny's (often shortened to Frankie's) is a chain of Italian-American-themed restaurants in the United Kingdom run by The Big Table. As of November 2022, it had 90 outlets nationwide.

Frankie & Benny's runs smaller outlets, trading as "Little Frankie's". These are typically smaller than full-sized restaurants, have a smaller menu and are found on high-streets and in town centres.

== History ==
The first Frankie & Benny's restaurant was opened by City Centre Restaurants (since rebranded as The Restaurant Group) in 1995.

Sometime in-between 1998 and 2005, TRG began converting former Deep Pan Pizza restaurants into Frankie & Benny's, Chiquito and a selection of other brands under the same management. The chain opened its 100th restaurant in 2005.

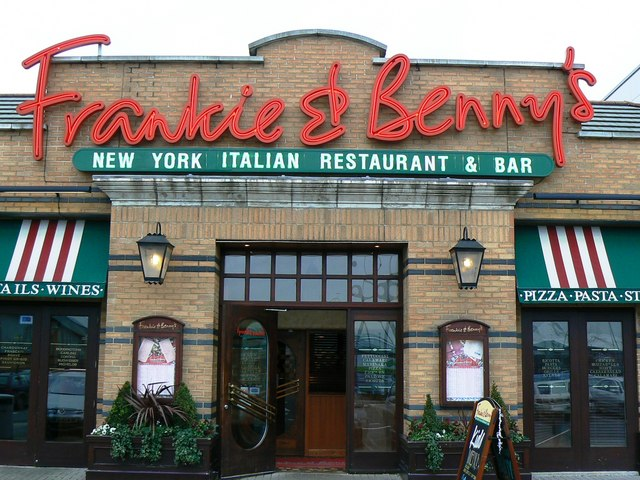
Typical entrance to a previous Frankie & Benny's restaurant, in Swindon.

In 2016, 33 underperforming restaurants were closed or sold. Then, in January 2017, The Restaurant Group attempted to reinvent the brand by introducing a new menu, a tweaked logo, new branding and new staff uniforms in 2018 in order to appeal to millennials and younger customers who were choosing rivals like Zizzi or Nando's. The rebrand did not appear to work as planned, as it ailienated the core customer base and did not attract new ones, and in 2019, 18 restaurants were closed or sold.

In 2019, it was reported that virtual restaurant brands Birdbox and Stacks were operating on delivery services Deliveroo and Uber Eats from Frankie & Benny's restaurants. Seven new vegan dishes were added to the menu in January 2020.

In February 2020, the company announced that further closures or sales were planned to take place by the end of 2021.

On 3 June 2020, during the COVID-19 pandemic in the United Kingdom, The Restaurant Group told employees a "large number" of its Frankie & Benny's outlets would not reopen after lockdown; 120 restaurants were sold off in 2020 and in 2021.

In October 2021, the chain refurbished its restaurant in Basildon, which had its name shortened to "Frankie's". It had a similar menu, but a different interior design to typical restaurants.

In March 2023, the chain announced it would sell 35 more restaurants due to the current cost of living crisis. Up to three restaurants would be converted into Wagamama's, and their aim was to reduce the total number of restaurants from 90 to 65 by 2024. 18 restaurants were sold off in May.

The Restaurant Group announced in September 2023 that they would sell the company, alongside the rest of TRG's loss-making assets, to The Big Table, who own Café Rouge and Bella Italia, for £7.5 million. On 30 October, it was announced that the sale had been completed. Initially, the plan was to retire the Frankie & Benny's brand long-term and convert the majority of the remaining restaurants into the more successful format Las Iguanas and the newly-acquired Banana Tree, but Big Table CEO Alan Morgan commented, "Customers are choosing Frankie's over most businesses next to them. There's just no one who believes they are there!"

In September 2024, the chain's owners made the decision that the chain ought to revert to its 1995 origins in order to revive the brand and foster growth. This brand refresh, which included significant changes to the menu and a change in brand colours to blue and red, was implemented subsequent to extensive research conducted with thousands of customers, including both existing and potential customers. Feedback gathered indicated that while the chain had numerous strengths, a return to its roots was necessary. The chain unveiled new uniforms, returned to 1950s music in restaurants and relaunched its 1990s dishes on the new menu.

== Controversy ==
In October 2012, a two-year-old was served whisky instead of lime and water. The chain apologised, saying they would prevent anything similar from happening again, but any preventative measures seemed to have failed when, in December 2017, an alcoholic drink was served to a four-year-old girl in the Warrington branch. A spokesman for the chain apologised for the incident which was described as "genuine human error".

In May 2014, a Frankie & Benny's diner complained after he was served a crab dish containing surimi. A statement from the chain acknowledged the incident and apologised for any upset caused. The item was eventually removed from the menu.

In November 2015, the chain was given the lowest rating (red) in an assessment of the sustainability of its seafood products.

== Theme ==
The fictional backstory of the chain starts in 1924 when at the age of 10, Frankie Giuliani left Sicily with his parents and moved to Little Italy in New York City. Within a year of moving, the family had opened a restaurant, everybody helping with the building and the cooking in equal measure. Frankie went to the nearby high school and became lifelong friends with Benny, already a third-generation American. The restaurant was taken over by Frankie and Benny in 1953. It combines popular American food with traditional Italian dishes.
