= Zaks Diners =

British restaurant chain

- Type: Privately-owned
- Genre: Restaurant chain
- Founded: 1976
- Founder: Harvey Platt
- Headquarters: Norwich, England
- Owner: Chris Carr and Ian Hacon
- Website: www.zaks.uk.com

Zaks Diners is a British restaurant chain of American-themed diners, founded as a takeaway business in 1976 by Harvey Platt. The chain is based in Norwich, England. They are the second-largest independent American-themed diner chain in the UK, behind OK Diner.

== History ==
In May 1976, local musician and entrepreneur Harvey Platt felt that Norwich needed "a slice of America" and purchased an old café caravan, and began selling burgers wrapped in tin-oil and cooked to order. In 1979, Zaks opened their first physical restaurant, also in Norwich.

In 1998, the chain was acquired by Blue Sky Leisure. A new location was added in the former Swan pub in Poringland in 2005.

In July 2013, the chain announced its plans to begin franchising locations.

In January 2020, Chris Carr and Ian Hacon purchased the chain from Blue Sky Leisure. Later in 2020, due to the COVID-19 pandemic, the chain reverted to selling from caravans again whilst normal trading was suspended.

In August 2022, the chain purchased the Yankee Traveller in Great Yarmouth.

== See also ==
- OK Diner
