= Jonathan Liew =

Sportswriter

Jonathan Liew is a journalist at The Guardian. Liew has been named the sports writer of the year, and sports columnist of the year, at the annual SJA Awards.

== Early life ==
Liew graduated from the University of Edinburgh with a degree in History.

== Career ==
Liew started in 2009 on The Daily Telegraph's graduate training scheme after being named the 2007 Student Columnist of the Year in The Guardian's Student Media Awards for a sports column in the student paper Injury Time, while studying at the University of Edinburgh. He became a feature writer and columnist at the Daily Telegraph, where he was named as the 2011 Sports Journalists' Association "young sports writer of the year". At the Telegraph, Liew estimated he covered at least 39 sports on five different continents and developed a fondness for rugby league.

Liew moved to The Independent in June 2017 and as part of his role he featured regularly as a pundit on The Indy Football Podcast which was nominated for best podcast at the 2017 Football Supporters Federation awards. Liew also guested on podcasts such as Second Captains and The Anfield Wrap.

In October 2019, it was announced that Liew had joined The Guardian after winning an essay writing competition with a piece titled "Something funny happened on the way to the stadium". Liew has appeared on Sky Sports television programmes Sunday Supplement, World Cup Supplement, and Cricket Writers on TV. He contributes columns to the cricket almanac Wisden and has written for Prospect and the Belfast Telegraph.

There was criticism of a March 2026 Guardian column by Liew in which he wrote that the "very presence" of a new Gail's branch near a Palestinian-run cafe in Archway, London "feels quietly symbolic, an act of heavy-handed high-street aggression", further describing it as a one of a "number of predators". Liew wrote that those who repeatedly vandalized Gail's were engaging in "small acts of petty symbolism", and "direct[ing] their ire at the bakery with distant links to Israeli security funding", referring to its majority owner, Bain Capital. The article was criticised by Kemi Badenoch, the leader of the Conservative Party, the Board of Deputies of British Jews, Rachel Riley, Sebastian Payne, Stephen Pollard, Giles Coren, and several staff members at The Guardian. In response to the complaints, The Guardian made edits to the article, including removing the phrase "small acts of petty symbolism" and moving the wording "high-street aggression".

=== Activism ===
Liew has received praise from his peers for the way he has spoken out on diversity, equity and inclusion issues within sport. He is a "Raise Your Game" mentor for the Kick It Out campaign. In September 2019, Liew spoke out on the issue of under representation of British Asians in professional football in England, stating that he believed that the issue began at grassroots level.

=== Recognition ===
Liew was nominated in the "writer for the year" category at the 2018 Football Supporters Federation Awards. He was shortlisted for the 2019 football journalist of the year award and won the 2019 sports columnist of the year award at the SJA awards.

Liew was shortlisted for the Writer of the Year at the Football Supporters' Association awards in 2020 and 2021. In September 2022 he was nominated for "Sports Journalist of the Year" at The Press Awards.

== Personal life ==
On 17 May 1997, 9-year-old Liew performed at a piano recital, but was unable to master a tricky section of his piece. He reattempted, but again failed. Frustrated, he slammed his hands down on the piano. His piano teacher scolded him: "That's no way to treat a piano".

Liew appeared as a contestant on the Channel 4 television quiz show Countdown in 2013, becoming an "octochamp" by winning eight episodes in a row.
