= Joanne Thompson (field hockey) =

British field hockey player

Jo Thompson
Personal information
- Full name: Joanne Sarah Thompson
- Born: 13 May 1965 (age 61) Dartford, Kent, England
- Height: 168 cm (5 ft 6 in)
- Weight: 64 kg (141 lb)

Sport
- Sport: Field hockey
Medal record
Women's field hockey
Representing Great Britain
Olympic Games
| Bronze medal – third place | 1992 Barcelona | Team |
Representing England
European Nations Cup
| Gold medal – first place | 1991 Brussels | Team |

Joanne Sarah "Jo" Thompson (born 13 May 1965 in Dartford, Kent, England) is a former field hockey goalkeeper, who was a member of the British squad that won the bronze medal at the 1992 Summer Olympics in Barcelona. She also participated in the 1996 Summer Olympics in Atlanta, Georgia, where Team GB finished fourth. She is a former pupil of Langley Grammar School. She now works for PPG in Stowmarket, UK.
