= Daniel Johnson (journalist) =

British journalist, commentator and author (born 1957)

Daniel Benedict Johnson (born 26 August 1957) is a British journalist and author who was the founding editor of Standpoint magazine. Since 2018, he has been founding editor of the online journalism platform TheArticle, an associate editor of The Critic magazine and commentator for The Daily Mail, The Mail on Sunday, and The Daily Telegraph.

== Biography ==
Daniel Johnson is the son of the author Paul Johnson and brother of Cosmos Johnson, Sophie Johnson-Clark and entrepreneur Luke Johnson.

After attending Langley Grammar School he graduated with a First in Modern History from Magdalen College, Oxford, and then studied at Peterhouse, Cambridge for three years from 1978 to 1981. Johnson was awarded a Shakespeare Scholarship to Berlin. Returning to English academia as a fellow of Queen Mary, University of London, he served as Director of Publications for the Centre for Policy Studies.

Johnson covered the fall of the Berlin Wall as German correspondent for The Daily Telegraph and has worked as a leader writer for both The Times and The Telegraph, as well as literary editor and associate editor for The Times. On 9 November 1989, Johnson attended an East German Government press conference on loosening of travel restrictions for East Germans, and asked the final question: "What will happen to the Berlin Wall now?" His question and Günter Schabowski's response is shown nightly in a video displayed every evening to tourists at the Deutsche Bundestag building in Berlin.

In 2008, he launched Standpoint magazine as founding editor. He stepped down in December 2018. He was also a contributing editor to The New York Sun and a contributor to The Times Literary Supplement, The Literary Review, Prospect, Commentary, and The New Criterion, as well as The American Spectator and The Weekly Standard. Allegations were published in the 9 January 2008 issue of The New York Sun, written by Johnson about then-presidential candidate Barack Obama and Kenya's candidate (and subsequent Prime Minister) Raila Odinga, based on what was later described as "a patently fallacious story ... The Sun is attempting to get away with lies about the Democratic presidential candidate, or at the very least to shirk their responsibility to the truth."

In 2018, Johnson became the founding editor of a new political opinion website, TheArticle.

In 2013, he participated in an Oxford Union debate arguing that Islam is not a religion of peace. He has been criticised for writing in Standpoint in 2015 that "the Islamisation of Europe is no longer a far-right fantasy, but a real possibility", and that an increase in the number of Muslims could create "a new European hell".

He is Catholic and is married with four children.

== Bibliography ==
- 1989 German Neo-Liberals and the Social Market Economy
- 1991 Thomas Mann: Death in Venice and other stories
- 2007 White King and Red Queen: How the Cold War was Fought on the Chessboard
