= Sun Capital Partners (UK) =

British private equity firm

Sun Capital Partners Limited
- Company type: Private
- Founded: 2001; 25 years ago
- Founder: Hugh Osmond
- Headquarters: Marble Arch; London, W1; United Kingdom
- Key people: Hugh Osmond (founder and chairman)
- Website: Sun Capital Partners Ltd

Sun Capital Partners Limited is a British private equity firm headquartered in Central London.

== History ==
Sun Capital Partners Limited was founded in 2001 by Hugh Osmond.

It is located on Portman Mews South in Marble Arch, central London.

In 2014, Sun Capital and TDR Capital acquired Keepmoat, a British housebuilding company.
