= Neighbourly (community investment platform) =

Neighbourly is a community impact and giving platform based in Bristol, UK. The platform hosts pages for upwards of 30,000 small charities and community organisations across the UK and Ireland, connecting them with businesses offering surplus food and products, volunteer time and financial donations.

For example, supermarket chains including Aldi, Lidl, Marks and Spencer, and Sainsbury's have partnered with Neighbourly to redistribute surplus food and products to food banks and community groups.

Neighbourly has also partnered with businesses including Penguin, Danone, Coca-Cola EP, Heineken, B&Q, Southern Co-op and Samsung to manage and deliver their corporate impact programmes - such as employee volunteering and charitable grant distribution. Neighbourly provides detailed social and environmental impact data for clients to measure and report on the overall impact of their programmes.

Neighbourly was founded in 2013 by Nick Davies, who appointed Zoe Colosimo as COO. In 2018, Steve Butterworth took over the company as chief executive officer. The company is one of the UK's founding B Corps and is accredited by the Good Business Charter.

In March 2021, Neighbourly raised £3M in Series A investment from Guinness Asset Management to expand their senior leadership team and accelerate the growth of the business.

In May 2022 the company announced it had raised £1.6m in an accelerator investment round led by Guinness Ventures.

In March 2023, the company released new capability to allow medium-sized businesses to access the platform to increase their local social and environmental impact through employee volunteering and financial donation programmes.

== Neighbourly Foundation ==
In 2020, Neighbourly set up an independent charity - the Neighbourly Foundation - which works to funnel donations and grant money from its donors and partners directly to charities and community groups that are registered on the platform.

== Awards ==
In 2020 Neighbourly was ranked in the RWRC Discovery 50 - a list comprising the top 50 retail tech start-ups operating globally. The company was also voted the People's Choice at the Digital Agenda Impact Awards 2020 and won the Tech Company of the Year (for revenues under £5M) and Sustainable Tech Awards at the Tech South West Awards 2020.

In 2021 Neighbourly won the Sustainability Initiative of the Year award at Food Matters Live, Best Community Initiative at the CorpComms Awards, the Social Value award at the National Recycling Awards and the Waste & Resource Management Project of the Year at the Edie Sustainability Leaders Awards.

In 2022, Neighbourly was awarded a Queen's Awards for Enterprise in the Innovation category and won the Spectator Economic Innovator of the Year award for the South West region.

In 2023, the company won the Management Today Business Leadership Award in the Technology category.
