= Chiquito (restaurant) =

United Kingdom restaurant chain

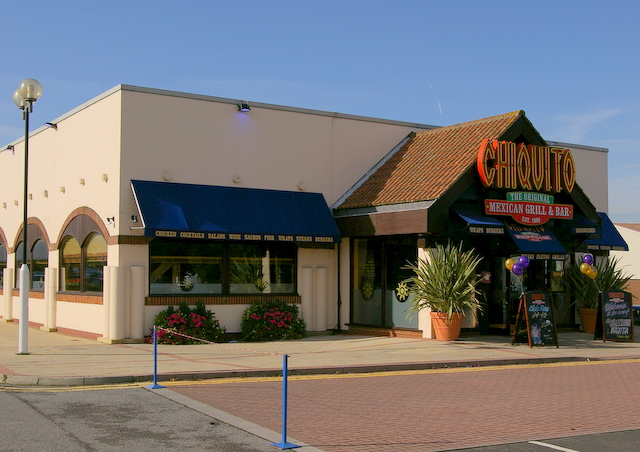
- Typical Chiquito's standalone unit development, Kingston-upon-Hull with a previous logo.
- Type: Tex-Mex Mexican themed restaurant chain
- Founded: 1989; 37 years ago
- Headquarters: United Kingdom
- Number of locations: 7
- Owner: The Big Table; (2023–present)
- Website: chiquito.co.uk

Chiquito is a restaurant chain based in the United Kingdom specialising in Tex-Mex foods. It historically also served food via its virtual restaurants Cornstar Tacos and Kickass Burritos.

== History ==
The company was established in 1989, and at one stage had sixty eight restaurants across the country. It dubs itself as 'The Original Mexican Grill & Bar', and has been described as the United Kingdom's best known Mexican chain. Until 2023, the Chiquito units were part of the Restaurant Group (TRG).

Sometime in-between 1998 and 2005, TRG began converting former Deep Pan Pizza restaurants into Frankie & Benny's, Chiquito and a selection of other brands under the same management.

Following the coronavirus pandemic, it was announced that restaurants of Chiquito would not be reopening after social distancing restrictions are lifted. In an announcement to the stock exchange on 18 March, owners The Restaurant Group announced their intention to place Chiquito into administration. The chain re-opened a limited number of its restaurants in August 2020.

TRG announced in September 2023 that they would sell its loss-making assets (including Chiquito), to The Big Table, who own Café Rouge and Bella Italia for £7.5 million. On October 30, it was announced that the transaction had been completed.

== Decor and style ==
The restaurants, which tend to feature a large bar and lounge style restaurant have rustic interior décor, based on traditional Mexican architecture and culture, where old Mexican posters and photos adorn the walls, alongside piñatas plates, balloons, castanets, fans, and sombreros. Spanish and Mexican music play throughout the restaurant.

== Notable past employees ==
Nick Frost, actor and writer, worked at the Staples Corner (London) branch where he first met Simon Pegg.

== Environmental record ==
In November 2015, the chain was one of seven restaurants surveyed that failed to meet a basic level of sustainability in its seafood.
