= Bella Italia =

British restaurant chain

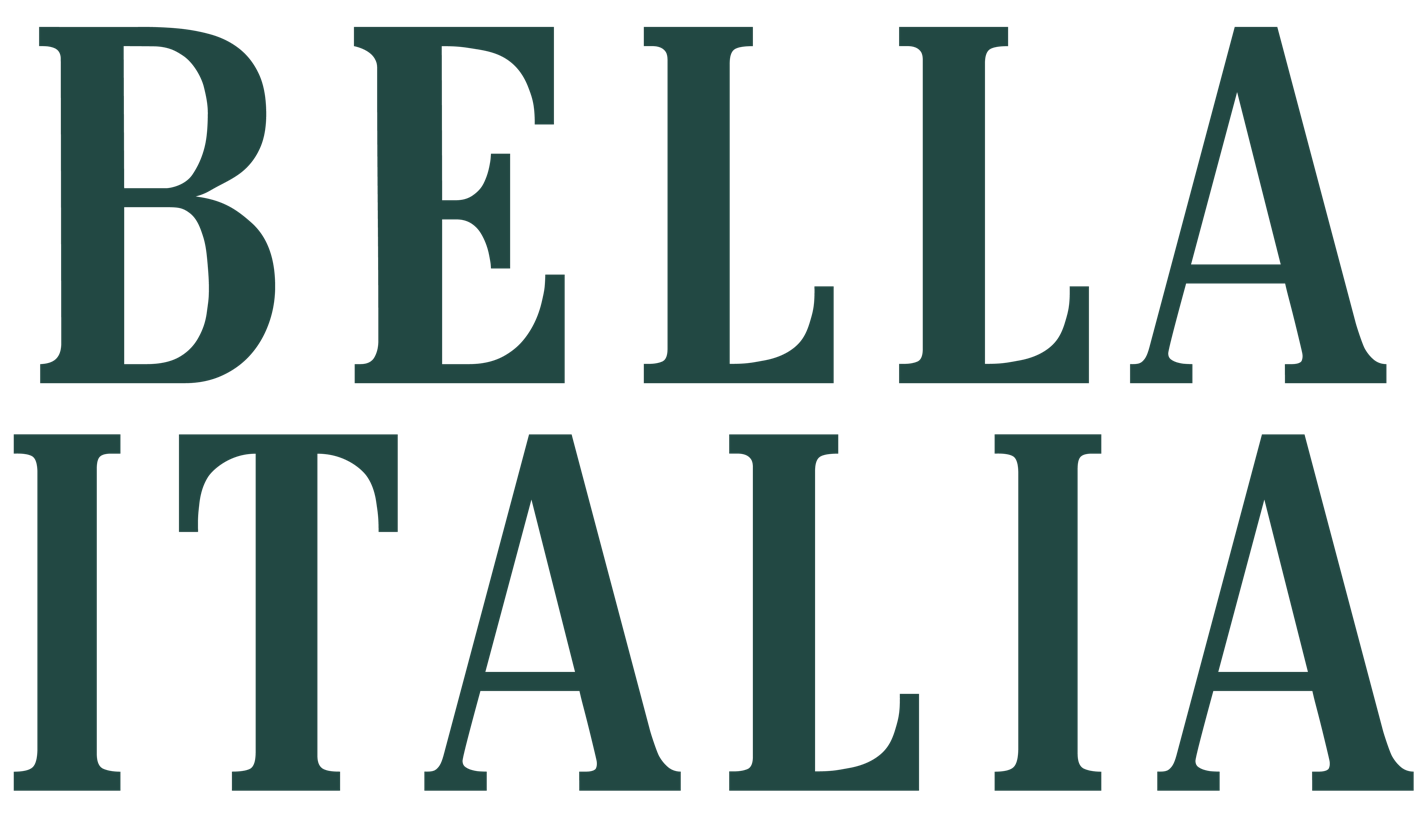
- Trade name: Bella Italia
- Company type: Private
- Industry: Restaurant
- Headquarters: London, England
- Parent: The Big Table
- Website: bellaitalia.co.uk

Bella Italia (formerly known as Bella Pasta), is a chain of over 90 restaurants offering meals inspired by Italian cuisine in the United Kingdom and Ireland. The chain is part of The Big Table, which also owns Café Rouge, Frankie & Benny's, and Las Iguanas.

== History ==
Bella Italia started life as two small restaurant chains - Pastificio and Pizzaland both of which were part of the Grand Metropolitan group.

In 1990, Michael Guthrie (former Chairman of Mecca Leisure Group) formed BrightReasons and bought the Pizzaland and Pastificio chains from Grand Metropolitan for £20m in February 1991, rebranding Pastificio to Bella Pasta in the process.

In February 1993, BrightReasons purchased 43 Pizza Piazza and Prima Pasta restaurants from Rank Organisation for £20.25m, bringing their total number of restaurants to 165.

In May 1994, BrightReasons started preparing for a stock market flotation, and the group was expected to be valued at between £70m-£100m. This was subsequently announced in September, however, in November 1994, the planned flotation was postponed.

In November 1996, BrightReasons was put up for sale after suffering a particularly tough trading period in 1995. In November 1996, BrightReasons was acquired by Whitbread for £46m, but was sold off less than six years later for £25m to Tragus Holdings (later renamed Casual Dining Group).

In December 2002, the Bella Pasta chain was rebranded as Bella Italia and the first fully branded restaurant opened in Leeds.

In 2007, Bella Italia's parent company Targus signed a concession agreement with holiday park operator Center Parcs UK and Ireland This led to the opening of Bella Italia Restaurants at the Company’s Elveden and Whinfell sites and was expanded in 2016, with the Strada Restaurants at Center Parcs Sherwood and Longleat Villages being rebranded as Bella Italia.

In September 2012, Bella Italia joined the Nectar loyalty card reward scheme as a redemption partner.

In September 2013, Bella Italia began a partnership with the Gourmet Society, offering their members discounts on production of a Gourmet Society restaurant discount card.

In light of the impact of the COVID-19 pandemic, in May 2020, Bella Italia's owner Casual Dining Group announced that it was working with advisors on next steps for the overall business as a prudent measure to protect the company whilst planning for the future. In July 2020, Casual Dining Group was placed into administration with 35 Bella Italia outlets set to close. Branches in Plymouth, Newbury, and Luton Airport permanently closed as administrators began selling off the group's assets.

== Cuisine ==
The menu combines pizza and pasta, which is their main focus, with a range of grill and speciality dishes. The food is complemented by some Italian wines - many from smaller producers - beers and soft drinks.

== Tipping and minimum wage ==
In 2009, the company was found to be threatening to dismiss waiting staff who do not get customers to pay tips on credit cards rather than in cash. Credit card tips were used by the company to subsidise wages (which are usually the legal minimum) whereas cash tips go directly to waiting staff. In line with changes to tipping legislation, which came into effect on 1 October 2009, Tragus Ltd reviewed and updated its policies to ensure that all tips, after a 10% deduction for administrative and other costs paid by credit or debit card, were distributed through the payroll system to restaurant staff.

In 2015, Bella Italia amended its policy to ensure all employees are permitted to keep all tips and service charges paid in cash and are free to share their tips with colleagues if they so wish. Their employees are required to declare the income generated from cash tips to HM Revenue & Customs for tax purposes. Tips given by card payments are also kept in full by employees. All restaurant employees are paid tips in addition to the National Minimum Wage.

== Environmental record ==
In November 2015, the chain received the worst rating of all restaurants surveyed in an assessment of the sustainability of its seafood. After working closely with the Marine Stewardship Council (MSC), Bella Italia came second in Fish2Fork's analysis of the fish sourcing policies of high street restaurants in 2017.

== Philanthropy ==
In June 2012, Bella Italia began officially supporting The Children's Society by donating some of the profit from a selected dish on the menu to the charity.

In 2013, Bella Italia officially partnered with Comic Relief, the British charity founded in 1985 that aims to "bring about positive and lasting change in the lives of poor and disadvantaged people."

== See also ==
- List of Italian restaurants
