= Hugh Osmond =

British entrepreneur and businessman (born 1962)

- Born: Hugh Edward Mark Osmond; 24 March 1962 (age 64)
- Education: Merton College, Oxford

Hugh Edward Mark Osmond (born 24 March 1962) is an entrepreneur and businessman and was the founder of Punch Taverns, one of the UK's largest chains of public houses.

== Early life ==
Hugh Edward Mark Osmond was born on 24 March 1962, the son of a doctor, and educated at Merton College, Oxford where he read medicine.

== Career ==
Osmond went to the US in 1983 and worked in clubs for a while. He then joined a small investment bank in Madrid. Returning to the UK he worked with Luke Johnson to launch the flotation of PizzaExpress in 1993. In 1997 he founded Punch Taverns which was one of the UK's largest chains of pubs: he was chairman of Punch Taverns from 1997 to 2001. In 2002 he became a leading partner in Sun Capital Partners: that vehicle secured a major investment in Pearl Group in 2005.

In 2001, he founded the London-based private equity firm, Sun Capital Partners Limited.

According to The Sunday Times Rich List in 2020 his net worth was estimated at £232 million.

== Public life ==
Osmond is a significant donor to the Conservative Party.

== Personal life ==
Osmond owns a shooting estate in Berkshire, and maintains homes in Moulsford in Oxfordshire, Wadebridge in Cornwall, and Marylebone in west London. He has three sons with his partner Lucy.

== See also ==
- Mike Fairey
