= Las Iguanas =

Latin American restaurant chain in the United Kingdom

Las Iguanas Ltd
- Type: Private company
- Industry: Casual dining
- Genre: Latin American
- Founded: 1991, Bristol, England
- Founders: Eren Ali and Ajith Jaya-Wickrema
- Headquarters: London, England
- Key people: Alan Morgan (MD)
- Products: Latin American food
- Parent: The Big Table
- Website: www.iguanas.co.uk

Las Iguanas is a casual dining restaurant chain originating from the UK, with a Latin American theme. Founded in 1991, it operated 57 outlets in the UK as of July 2019. It specialises in Latin American food from Brazil, Mexico, and beyond.

== History ==
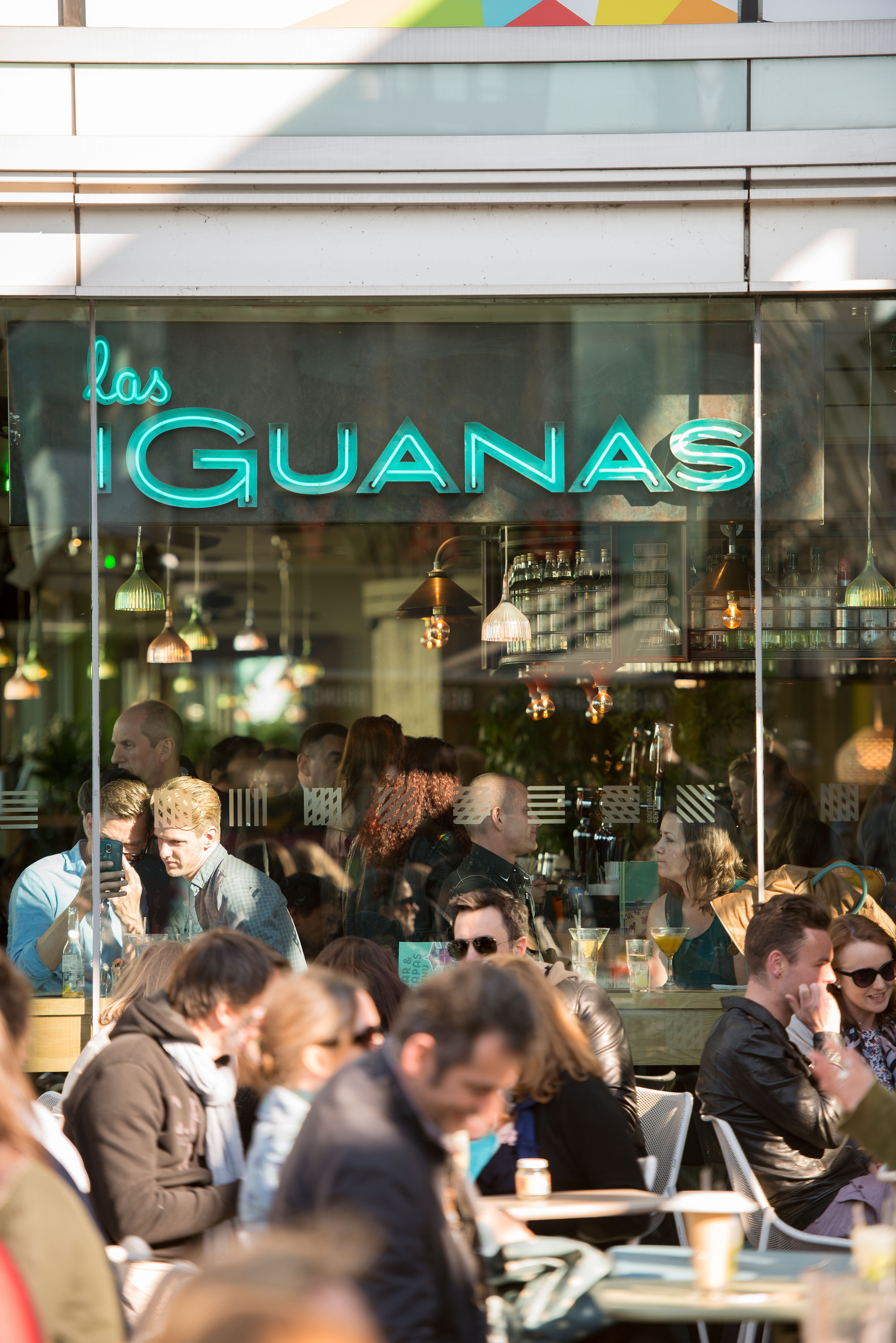
A Las Iguanas restaurant in London

The first Las Iguanas opened on St Nicholas Street, Bristol, in April 1991, offering a Latin American-themed menu. A further 53 restaurants have opened in the UK including Bath, Birmingham, Manchester, London and Edinburgh.

In 2003, the group acquired its own Cachaça sugar cane field and distillery on the Fazenda do Anil estate, outside Rio de Janeiro, Brazil.

One of the co-founders, Ajith Jaya-Wickrema, left Las Iguanas in August 2009 to co-start a Caribbean-themed restaurant chain, Turtle Bay. The first overseas branch of Las Iguanas was opened under franchise in Gibraltar in July 2018.

Las Iguanas was bought by Casual Dining Group in June 2015. In 2016, the first Las Iguanas Restaurant at Center parcs, opening at their Longleat resort. This has since expanded to other Center Parcs sites. In light of the impact of the COVID-19 pandemic, in May 2020, Casual Dining Group announced that it was working with advisors on next steps for the overall business as a prudent measure to protect the company whilst planning for the future. On 2 July 2020, the company entered administration, with 11 branches of Las Iguanas set to close. In August 2020, Casual Dining Group was acquired by the British private-equity firm Epiris and relaunched as The Big Table.

== Food ==
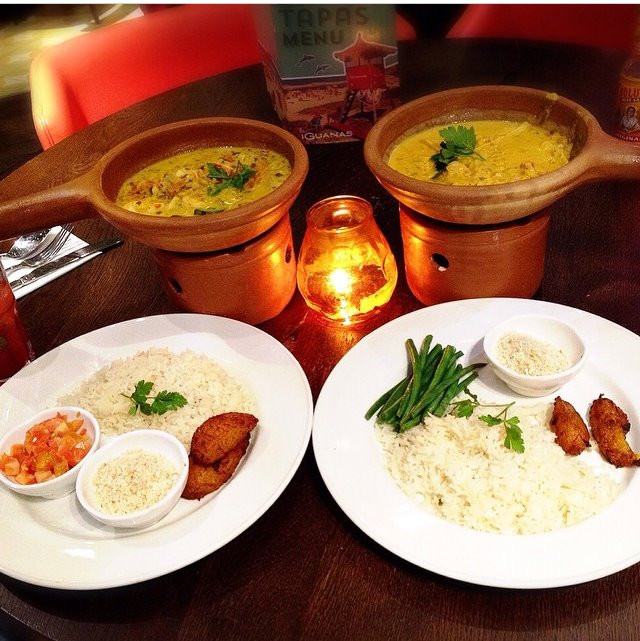
An example of food served in Las Iguanas – Xinxim

Las Iguanas menus include Latin American food such as nachos, burritos, xinxim, fajitas and tapas, along with steaks and burgers. They include vegetarian and vegan options such as veggie chilli, moqueca and empanadas, and gluten-free options. Las Iguanas is approved by the Vegetarian Society.

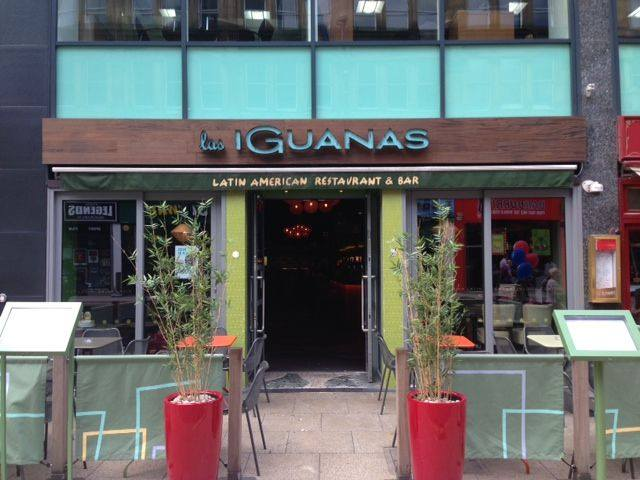
Las Iguanas Restaurant at Deansgate, Manchester, England

== Recognition ==
Las Iguanas made it on to the 2019 Sunday Times 100 Best Companies to work for in 26th place. The list celebrates UK companies with the highest levels of staff engagement. Las Iguanas also made the list in 2015 and 2013. Las Iguanas retained the Investors in People Gold award in 2015 and also holds IiP Champion status. The company held a Glassdoor.co.uk rating of 4.5 and a 92% approval rating of MD Mos Shamel in July 2019. Shamel stepped down from his role in July 2019, handing over to Julie McEwan who was promoted to brand director. In December 2019, Las Iguanas was recognised as the top-rated hospitality business on the Glassdoor Best Places to Work 2020 list, ranking 11th overall.

Las Iguanas won best restaurant drinks offer at the Restaurant Magazine R200 Awards in October 2014.

It won the overall award at the National Burger Awards 2017 with the Buenos Aires Burger. It won Best Non-traditional Cuban Sandwich and was runner up in World's Best Traditional Cuban Sandwich at the International Cuban Sandwich Festival in Tampa, Florida in April 2018.

== Controversy ==
In August 2015, the tips policy operated by Las Iguanas was the subject of press reports. Staff were required to pay back 3% of all sales (4.4% in London) to the company at the end of every shift out of their tips. Some staff said that this charge was taken even when they had received no tips for some tables forcing them to "pay to work". Las Iguanas, however, said that the charge was never taken from staff wages. Since then, an internal vote held amongst all staff has agreed a new policy.

100% of cash tips are now shared by the team. When tips or service charge are paid for by a credit card or debit card, 100% also goes to employees. Tips and service charges are in addition to the National Minimum Wage and National Living Wage.
