= Turtle Bay (restaurant) =

British restaurant chain

Turtle Bay Hospitality Limited
- Industry: Restaurant chain
- Founded: 2010
- Founder: Ajith Jayaprakash Jayawickrema
- Website: https://turtlebay.co.uk

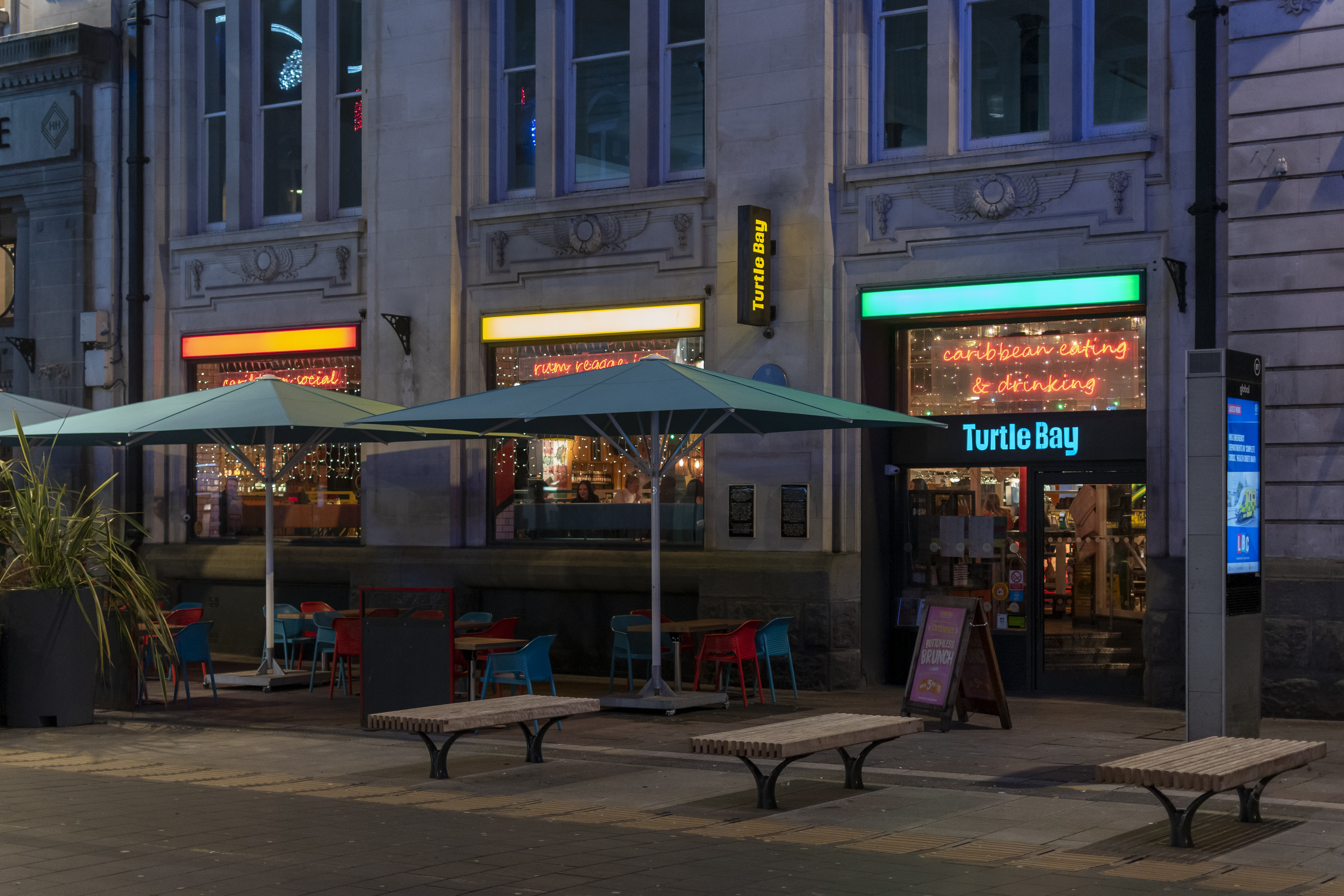
Turtle Bay, Cardiff in 2023

Turtle Bay Hospitality Limited is a British chain of Caribbean-themed restaurants, founded by Ajith Jayaprakash Jayawickrema in 2010. Jayawickrema had previously started the Mexican-themed restaurant chain Las Iguanas.

== History ==
By 2013, the company had 43 sites in the UK, and two in Germany. As of March 2024, the company had 52 sites in the UK.
