= The Restaurant Group =

British hospitality company

The Restaurant Group plc
- Type: Private
- Industry: Restaurant
- Founded: 1987; 39 years ago
- Headquarters: Glasgow, Scotland; London, England
- Key people: Ken Hanna (Chairman); Andy Hornby (CEO); Kirk Davis (CFO)
- Revenue: ▼£459.8 million (2020)
- Operating income: ▼£(49.7) million (2020)
- Net income: ▼£(119.9) million (2020)
- Owner: Apollo Global Management (2023–present)
- Number of employees: 14,000 (2021)
- Website: www.trgplc.com

The Restaurant Group plc is a British chain of restaurants and public houses. Their principal trading brands are Wagamama and Barburrito. The group also operates pub restaurants and a concessions business which trades principally at UK airports. It has been owned by the US private equity company Apollo since 2023.

== History ==
The company was founded by Matthew Brown from Chatteris in 1987 as City Centre Restaurants plc with the objective of owning and managing the Garfunkel's Restaurant chain. In the late 1980s, it bought the Mexican chain Chi Chi's and renamed it Chiquito.

In 1995, four years after it was reported to have 151 restaurants, the firm opened its first Frankie & Benny's in Leicester. Then, a month before making an unsuccessful bid for Ask Central plc, it changed its name to The Restaurant Group plc in January 2004.

In 2006, TRG bought back the Deep Pan Pizza chain, which it had previously sold to the management. In 2018, two years after announcing the closure of 33 units due to falling sales and profits, the firm purchased noodle chain Wagamama for £559m, to diversify its portfolio.

In May 2018, the Brunning & Price division purchased the Ribble Valley Inns, a collection of restaurant and real ale pubs in the north of England, from the Northcote Group for an undisclosed sum. In August, the division purchased the 11-strong portfolio of Food & Fuel Pubs, which included two Coco Momo wine bars, for £15.4 million.

On 3 June 2020, during the COVID-19 pandemic in the United Kingdom, The Restaurant Group told employees a "large number" of its outlets would not reopen after lockdown; up to 120 restaurants, mainly Frankie & Benny's, were set to close permanently, with the loss of between 2,000 and 3,000 jobs. On 8 June, TRG said it was in discussions with its landlords about potential restructuring options, and three days later announced it had entered a company voluntary arrangement (CVA) and planned to cut 125 sites.

In October 2020 the business suffered a significant shareholder revolt over the proposed pay package of its chief executive, Andy Hornby. After a year involving over 4,000 job losses and approximately 230 restaurant closures more than a third of investors opposed the package.

In 2023, The Restaurant Group sold most of its portfolio except for Wagamama, Brunning & Price and Barburrito to The Big Table Group for £7.5 million. In October, the board of the company announced that it intended to recommend to shareholders that they accept a £506 million takeover offer from US buyout group Apollo Global Management (APG).

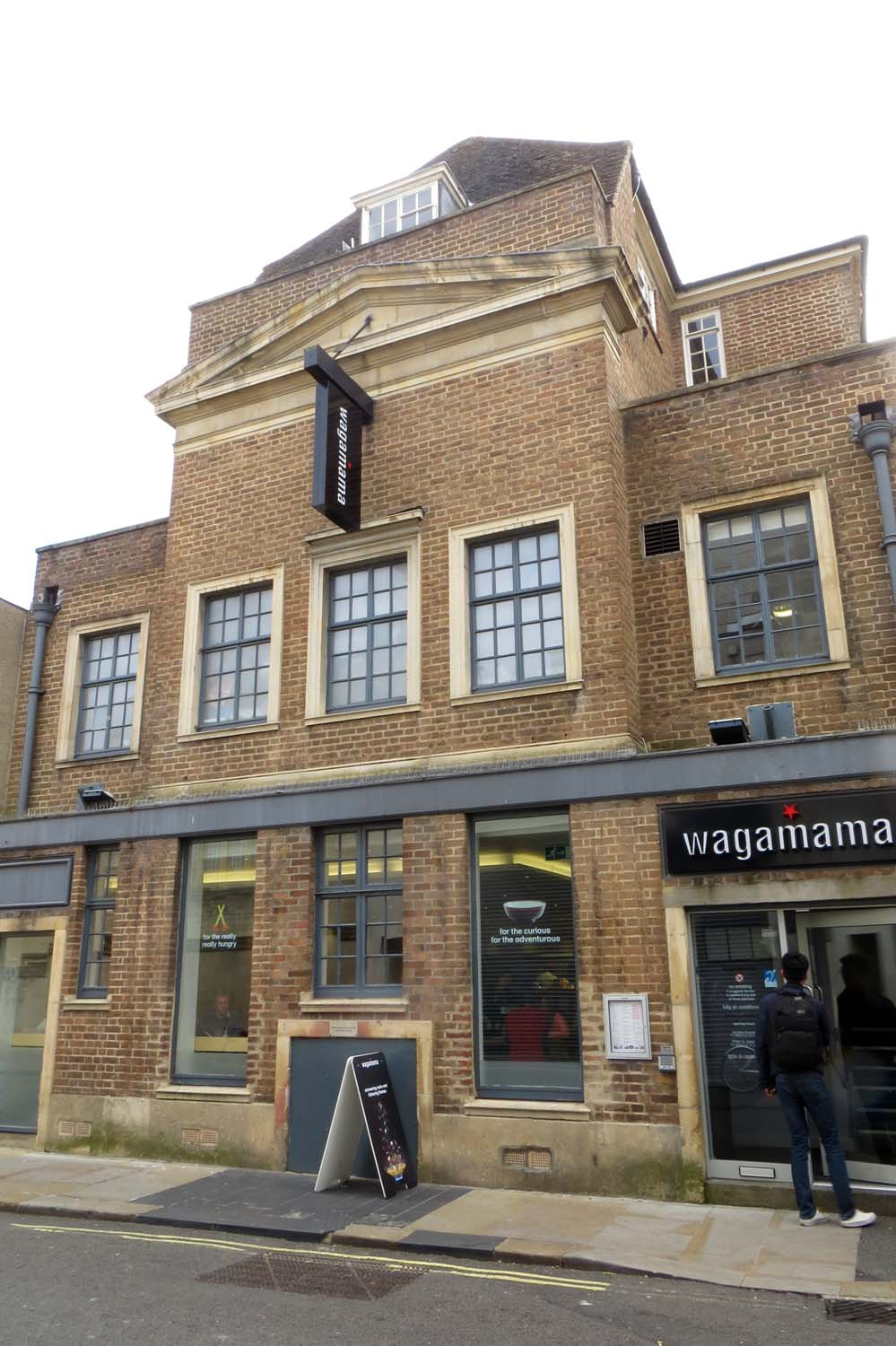
Wagamama in Market Street, Oxford

In December 2023, it was announced that Apollo had completed its purchase of the company for £701 million.

== Operations ==
As of December 2019, The Restaurant Group plc operated over 400 restaurants and pub restaurants throughout the UK. It also operates a multi‐brand Concessions business which trades principally in UK airports. In addition, the Wagamama business had 6 restaurants in the US and over 50 franchise restaurants operating across a number of territories.

=== Subsidiaries ===
- Barburrito
- Brunning & Price
- Wagamama (flagship brand)

== See also ==
- List of companies based in London
