= Café Rouge =

UK French-styled restaurant chain

- Type: Private
- Industry: Restaurant
- Founded: 1989; 37 years ago
- Headquarters: London, England, UK
- Number of locations: 5 restaurants
- Parent: The Big Table
- Website: caferouge.com

Previous logo

Café Rouge is a French-styled restaurant chain, with five sites across the United Kingdom, all of which are within Center Parcs resorts. Café Rouge, along with other restaurants, is owned by The Big Table.

== History ==
Café Rouge was founded by Roger Myers and Karen Jones, in Richmond, London as a small restaurant chain in 1989. As the chain grew, Myers and Jones incorporated it into a larger restaurant operation: the Pelican Group. In July 1996, Whitbread purchased Pelican Group – comprising 110 restaurants under the Dôme, Mamma Amalfi and, primarily, Café Rouge brands – for £133m.

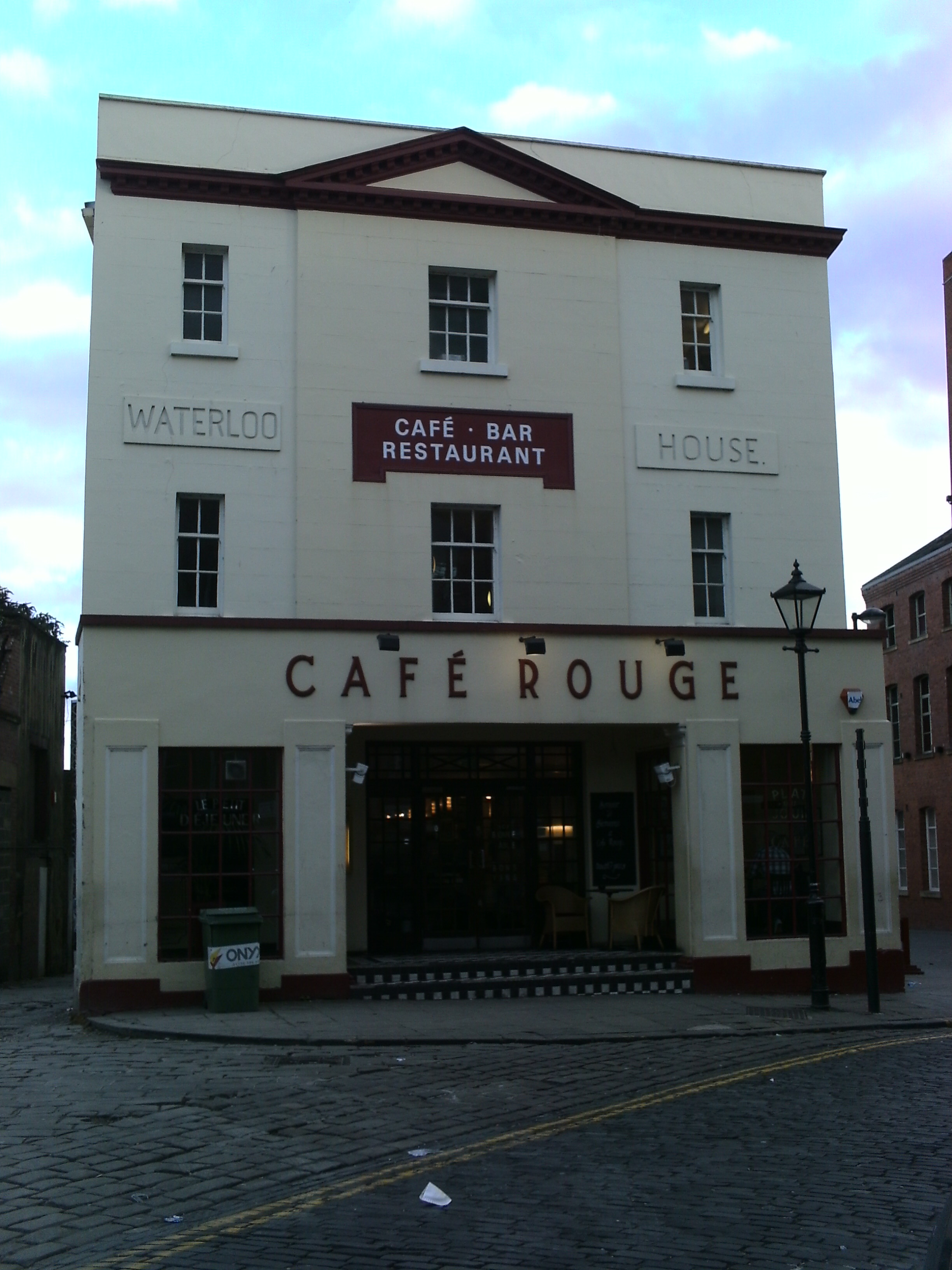
Café Rouge on Assembly Street, Leeds

The chain gained exposure from repeated mentions in the 1996 novel Bridget Jones's Diary, with the lead character, Bridget Jones, and her friends visiting her local branch throughout the novel.

In May 2002, Whitbread sold Pelican Group to Tragus Group (later renamed Casual Dining Group) in a management buy-in for £25m.

In 2007, Tragus signed a concession agreement with holiday park operator Center Parcs, leading to the opening of Cafe Rouge restaurants on all the company’s sites. This was expanded in 2014 with the opening of the company’s fifth village in Woburn.

In 2009, Café Rouge began a partnership with the Gourmet Society, offering its members discounts.

In February 2011, Café Rouge introduced a fast-service format to the brand: Café Rouge Express, at Euston railway station and Southampton's WestQuay shopping centre. These offered to reduce customer waiting time with a reduced menu range, to eat in or take away.

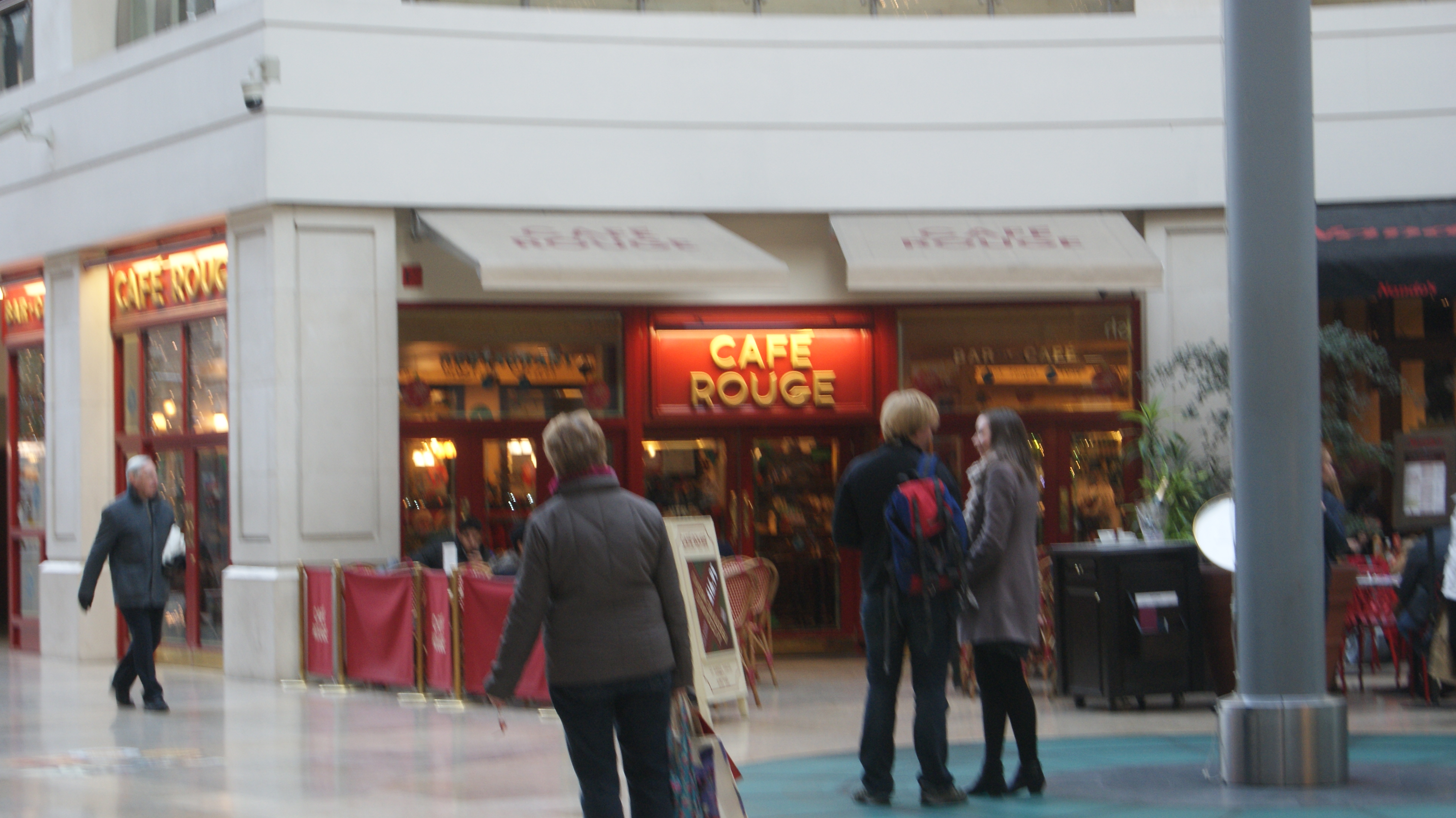
Café Rouge at The Light, Leeds

In 2012, it was reported that Café Rouge intended investing in excess of £20m refurbishing its restaurants over the next few years, starting with the Hampstead branch, designed by Afroditi Krassa. The design was to be rolled out across 125 restaurants within three years, with interiors tailored to each site.

In September 2012, Café Rouge joined the Nectar loyalty card reward scheme as a redemption partner.

In light of the impact of the COVID-19 pandemic, in May 2020 Café Rouge's owner Casual Dining Group announced that it was working with advisors on next steps for the overall business as a prudent measure to protect the company whilst planning for the future and, as part of that process, had filed a Notice of Intention to appoint administrators. On 2 July 2020, the company entered administration, with 32 branches of Café Rouge set to close. The Café Rouge company was dissolved on 4 August 2022. Casual Dining Group, owner of Café Rouge and Bella Italia, went into administration in November 2022.

The Café Rouge Web site listed 28 locations as of March 2023. As of January 2026, it was down to six, five in Center Parcs and one at St Katharine Docks in London.

== Charity ==
In 2013, Café Rouge were official partners of Comic Relief, the British charity founded in 1985 that aims to "bring about positive and lasting change in the lives of poor and disadvantaged people."

== Tipping and minimum wage ==
In 2008 the company was reported as paying staff less than the legal minimum wage, relying on tips to make up the difference. This led to a campaign in Parliament to make this practice illegal.

In 2009 the company was found to be threatening to dismiss waiting staff who do not get customers to pay tips on credit cards rather than in cash. Credit card tips were used by the company to subsidise wages (which are usually the legal minimum) whereas cash tips go directly to waiting staff. In line with changes to tipping legislation, which came into effect on 1 October 2009, Café Rouge reviewed and updated its policies to ensure that all tips, after a 10% deduction for administrative and other costs paid by credit or debit card, were distributed through the payroll system to restaurant staff. This was done via a tronc system. In 2015, Café Rouge amended its policy to ensure all employees are permitted to keep all tips and service charges paid in cash and are free to share their tips with colleagues if they so wish. Their employees are required to declare the income generated from cash tips to HM Revenue & Customs for tax purposes. When tips or service charges are paid for by credit card or debit card, the restaurant does take a 2.5% administration charge to cover administration and bank fees before distributing the remainder in full to employees. Employees retain any tips in addition to their pay at the rate of or above National Minimum Wage.

== Environmental record ==
In November 2015 the chain was one of seven restaurants surveyed that failed to meet a basic level of sustainability in its seafood. After working closely with the Marine Stewardship Council (MSC), Café Rouge topped Fish2Fork's analysis of fish sourcing policies across high street restaurants in 2017, and subsequently received MSC's official Blue Fish Ecolabel accreditation in March 2018.

== See also ==
- Bella Italia
- Strada
- Belgo
- Casual Dining Group
