= Infinis =

- Company type: limited company
- Industry: Energy
- Founded: 2006
- Headquarters: Northampton, United Kingdom
- Key people: Tony Cocker (Chairman); Shane Pickering (CEO)
- Revenue: £150.7 million (2018)
- Operating income: £29.24 million (2018)
- Website: www.infinis.com

Infinis Energy is a British renewable energy group headquartered in Northampton. Infinis produces electricity from captured landfill and mineral methane.

Infinis claims to have a net negative carbon emissions footprint.

== History ==
The company was originally created in 2006 as a subsidiary of Waste Recycling Group whose area of operations was the generation of energy from gas originating from the landfill sites in the WRG portfolio. The parent company, Terra Firma Capital Partners, then sold WRG in July 2006 while retaining Infinis. Novera Energy was acquired in 2009, bringing additional landfill gas sites, along with hydroelectric sites and wind development sites. Infinis went on to buy one operational and two consented wind farms from E.ON in 2011 and four wind farms from SSE in 2010 and 2011. After seven years of ownership by Terra Firma Capital Partners, the company was the subject of an IPO (initial public offering) in November 2013. Ian Marchant, formerly CEO of Scottish and Southern Energy, was appointed Independent Chairman of the Infinis Board, in September 2013 in the run up to the IPO.

In 2013 the Court of Appeal in England and Wales upheld a judgment in favour of Infinis against Ofgem, who had denied the company access to Renewable Obligation Certificates, a form of funding incentive for renewable energy generation, to which they were entitled. This case represented the first UK case where Article 1 of Protocol 1 ("A1P1") compensation under the European Convention on Human Rights had been granted in relation to a regulatory authority.

The company was acquired by Terra Firma Capital Partners in December 2015.

Following the acquisition of the landfill gas business by 3i on 8 December 2016, Shane Pickering was appointed Chief Executive of Infinis and Director to the boards of the two new governing companies. Tony Cocker was appointed as Non-executive Director and Chairman to the Board of Infinis Energy Management Limited (the Infinis Group's governing board) on 1 August 2017. On 11 April 2018, Infinis acquired 100% of Alkane energy, an independent energy producer from coal mine methane and power response.

== Operations ==
Infinis employs approximately 279 people across 153 operating sites with an aggregate generating capacity of 478MW*, comprising 121 landfill gas sites, 15 CMM sites and 17 PR sites.

== See also ==
- UK enterprise law
- Infinis Energy Holdings Ltd v HM Treasury [2016] EWCA Civ 1030
