= Kentish ragstone =

Hard grey limestone in Kent, England

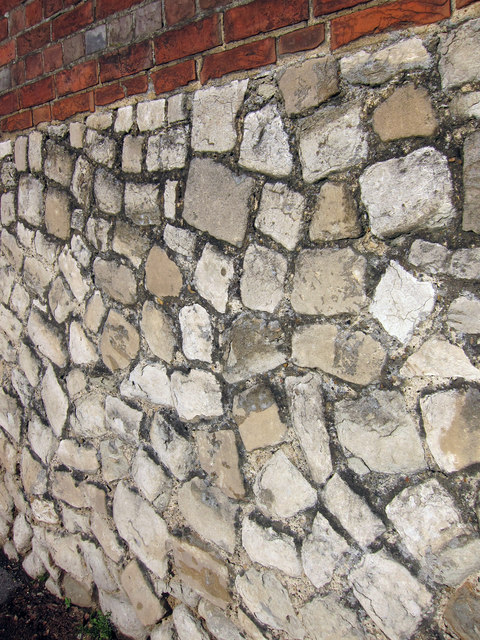

Kentish ragstone is a hard grey limestone in Kent, England, drawn from the geological sequence known as the Hythe Beds of the Lower Greensand. For millennia it has been quarried for use both locally and further afield.

== Geology ==
Ragstone occurs in a geological formation known in the Hythe Beds of the Lower Greensand, a layer of limestones running from Kent into Surrey which was laid down in the Cretaceous period. It outcrops in various places, notably at the cliffs of Hythe, Kent (whence the beds get their name) and along the Greensand Ridge above the Weald of Kent. Ragstone occurs in bands between 15 cm and 60 cm thick, alternating with bands of a loose material called hassock. These bands are of similar thickness and the difference in colour between them gives quarry faces a striped appearance. When the stone is extracted from the quarry, it appears to be of a grey green or blue grey colour but later weathers to an autumnal hue which, together with its hard-wearing properties, traditionally made it an attractive material for public building works.

== History ==
With hard rock for building being in short supply in south-east England, it was inevitable that the only significant source of hard limestone – Kentish ragstone – would be used in building from an early period. Since Roman times, ragstone has been used in roughly squared blocks for building walls. The stone was almost certainly quarried at the Tovil quarry near Maidstone, and then transported by boat along the River Medway to London. A Roman ship discovered at Blackfriars had a cargo of Kentish ragstone, probably from Maidstone, on board. Examples of Roman uses include the Roman walled cemetery at Boughton and the old Roman wall near Tower Hill underground station. It is possible that ragstone quarrying contributed to the rise of a small town in the Maidstone area in Roman times. Two villas in the locality had links with the quarrying and a settlement could have grown up for those working in the quarrying and shipping industries, as well as for those engaged in providing services to them.

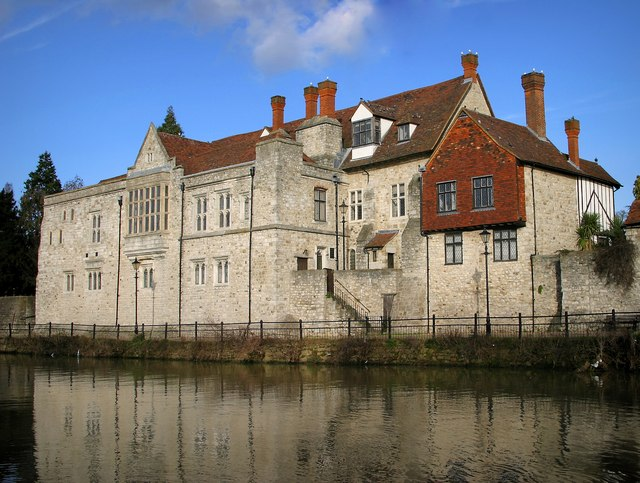
Archbishop's Palace, Maidstone

From 1066, the Normans constructed a large number of public buildings using ragstone, such as Westminster Abbey and the Tower of London, castles such as Rochester and Leeds, and churches such as All Saints and the Holy Cross churches in Maidstone. Other examples in Kent include the keep at Dover Castle, Westgate in Canterbury, Knole House, Ightham Mote, the Archbishop's Palace, Maidstone and Maidstone Prison. The building of Westminster Abbey in the 1240s required large quantities of ragstone with the result that local supplies were commandeered for that purpose: a royal command decreed that "no Kentish ragstone shall be carted to London for any other purpose until the Abbey is built". Another use for ragstone was to make cannonballs: in 1419 King Henry V ordered 7000 of these from Maidstone quarries. Most of Kent’s medieval parish churches were built of ragstone and although in Tudor times stone buildings went out of fashion in favour of brick, the demand for Gothic-style buildings in Victorian times led to many churches in south-east East England being built of ragstone. Ragstone was – and still is - also used in roads, and modern quarrying methods allow a wide range of products to be supplied today.

Ragstone acquired its name from the quarrymen who so named it because it would break along ragged edges. Because the rock is bedded between layers of hassock, the phrase ‘rag and hassock’ arose. In 1834 a fossil Iguanodon from a ragstone quarry (Bensted’s Quarry, later renamed Iguanodon Quarry) was recorded by the famous palaeontologist Gideon Mantell. By the 1940s over a dozen Kentish quarries were producing ragstone for roads and for buildings.

== Modern uses of Kentish ragstone ==
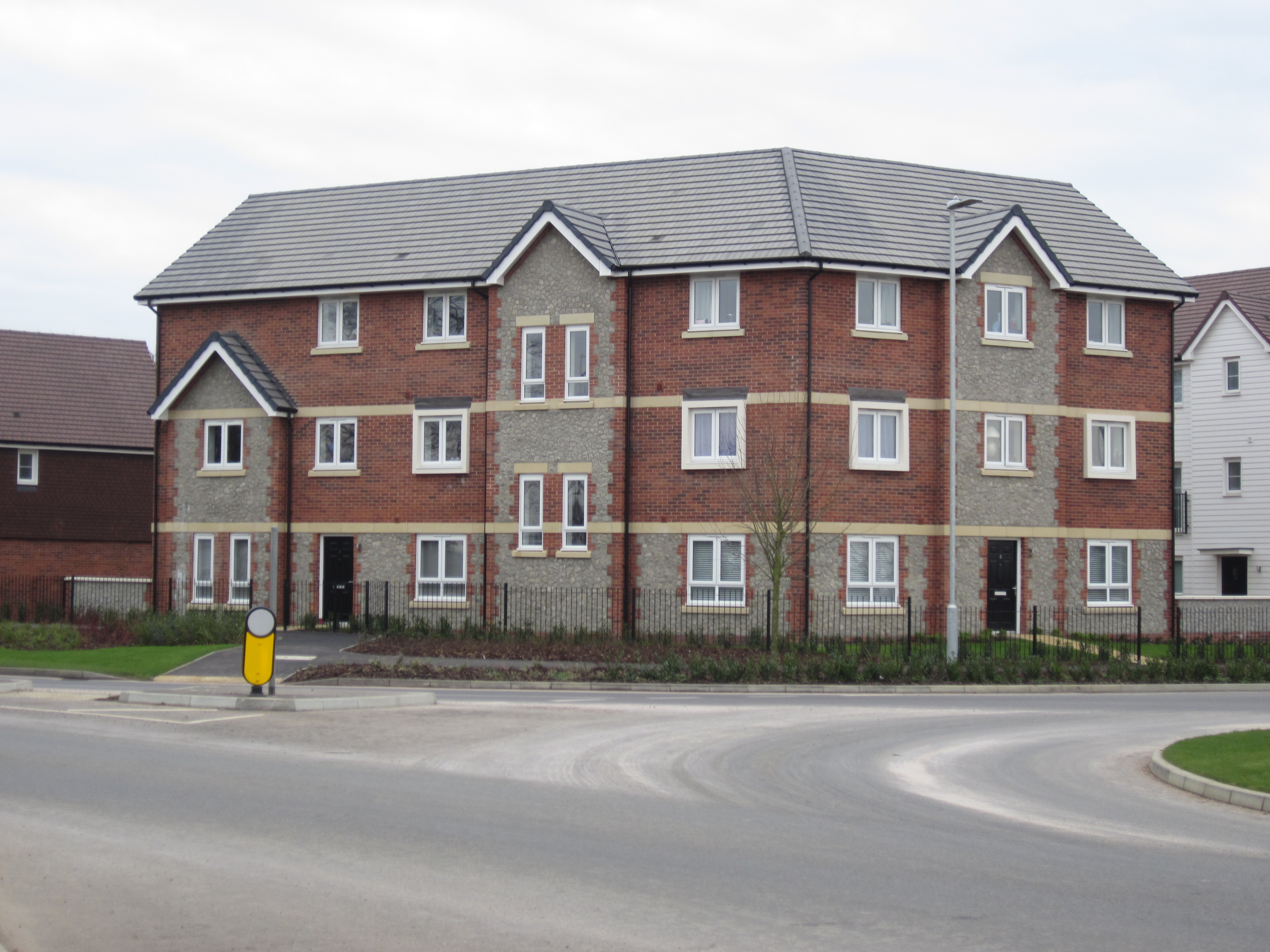
A new housing development in Maidstone, built using Kentish Ragstone

Only two ragstone quarries are operational in Kent, Hermitage Quarry in Barming and Blaise Farm near King's Hill. Hermitage Quarry continues to meet the traditional demand for building stone for use in modern buildings. Modern demand is busy and diverse, however, with about 60 different products being required for use in the ready mix concrete, road building and engineering industries. Block stone is used for the construction of walls and repairs to historical buildings. Larger stone is used for the construction of seawalls and barriers against coastal erosion.

Ragstone is important for repairing historic buildings to ensure that the repairs blend in with the original building. The Hermitage Quarry is the only supplier of Kentish Ragstone building stone in Kent. Blaise Farm is excavated mainly for aggregate, and is not regarded as being a realistic source of building stone. If ragstone cannot be obtained locally, historic buildings such as Rochester Castle, the Archbishop's Palace in Maidstone or the city walls at Canterbury will have to be repaired with stone imported from abroad or elsewhere in the UK, making it difficult to blend in repairs with a traditional Kentish ragstone appearance.

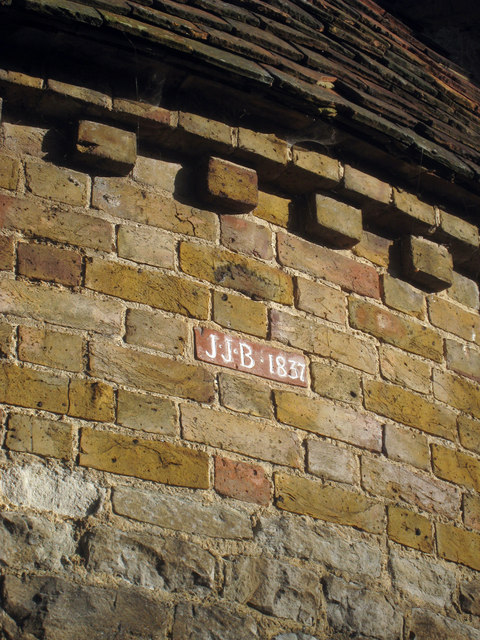
Yellow Flemish brick (top) contrasted with Kentish ragstone (bottom)

== Mines and quarries ==
=== Allington Quarry ===
Allington Quarry is a Site of Special Scientific Interest (SSSI) as the result of interesting geological features uncovered as a result of quarrying. Once sand and ragstone quarrying had ceased, the quarry became the site of the Allington Quarry Waste Management Facility.

Allington was an attractive site for ragstone quarrying on account of its geology and close proximity to the River Medway which allowed quarried stone to be easily transported by boat to London. There is evidence of quarrying in the area since 1174 with the construction of Allington Castle in 1174 and the Allington quarry had certainly existed since the 1790s. In the region of 20 million tonnes of stone were extracted from the quarry for use in local buildings, roads and railways, most recently to build the Channel Tunnel Rail Link.

In 2001 owners Hanson Aggregates decided to close the site and relocate to the quarry at Blaise Farm, near Offham, which was estimated to have reserves of 35 million tonnes. Among the last pieces of stone extracted from the quarry were some given to Langley Park School for Boys in Beckenham, Kent, for the construction of stone seating circles at the school.

=== Bensted's (or Iguanodon) Quarry (TQ 747558) ===
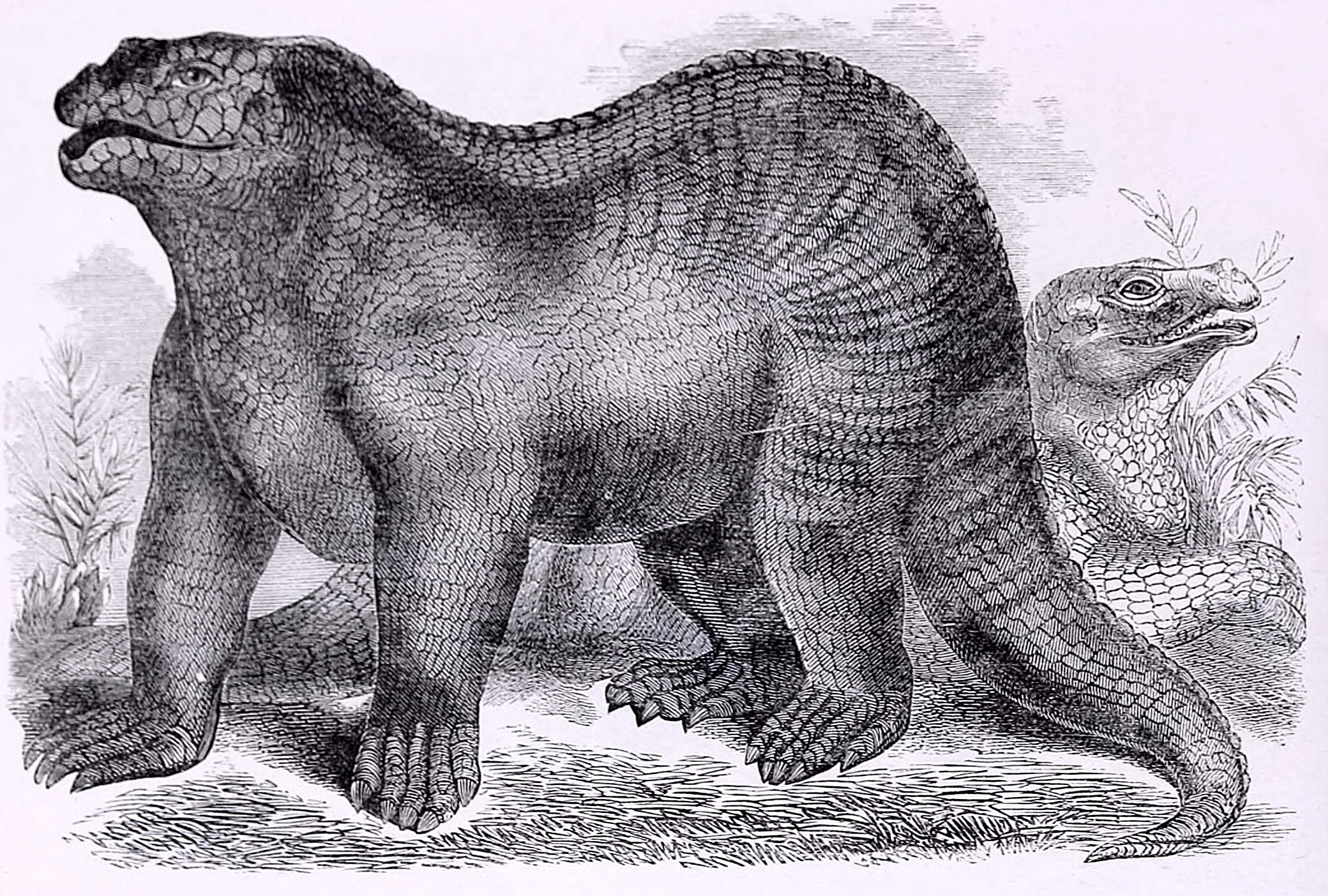
Goodrich Iguanodon

In the nineteenth century, this quarry was an important source of ragstone but the site is most famous for Gideon Mantell’s discovery of the fossilised bones of an Iguanodon in 1834. Explosives were regularly used to uncover fresh sources of ragstone but, on this occasion, bones were exposed and preserved by the quarry owner, William Bensted.

The quarry closed in 1872 and the quarry faces are no longer visible, having been built over in the 1970s. The Iguanodon is today depicted in Maidstone's Coat-of-Arms.

=== Blaise Farm Quarry (TQ 662562) ===
Following the departure of Hanson from Allington, the Blaise Farm Quarry opened in 2001. Hanson withdrew in 2005 and the quarry was taken over by Gallagher Aggregates Limited. Although the site is 116 hectares with permission for quarrying 57 million tonnes of ragstone over 62 years, the quality of the ragstone is considered to be of a lesser quality than that found in Gallagher's Hermitage Quarry and is only used to meet low-level demand for low grade aggregate. As part of a requirement to restore areas after extraction, the quarry is infilled with hassock. Part of the site comprises a composting facility of about 6.74 hectares on the floor of the disused quarry.

=== Borough Green Quarry ===
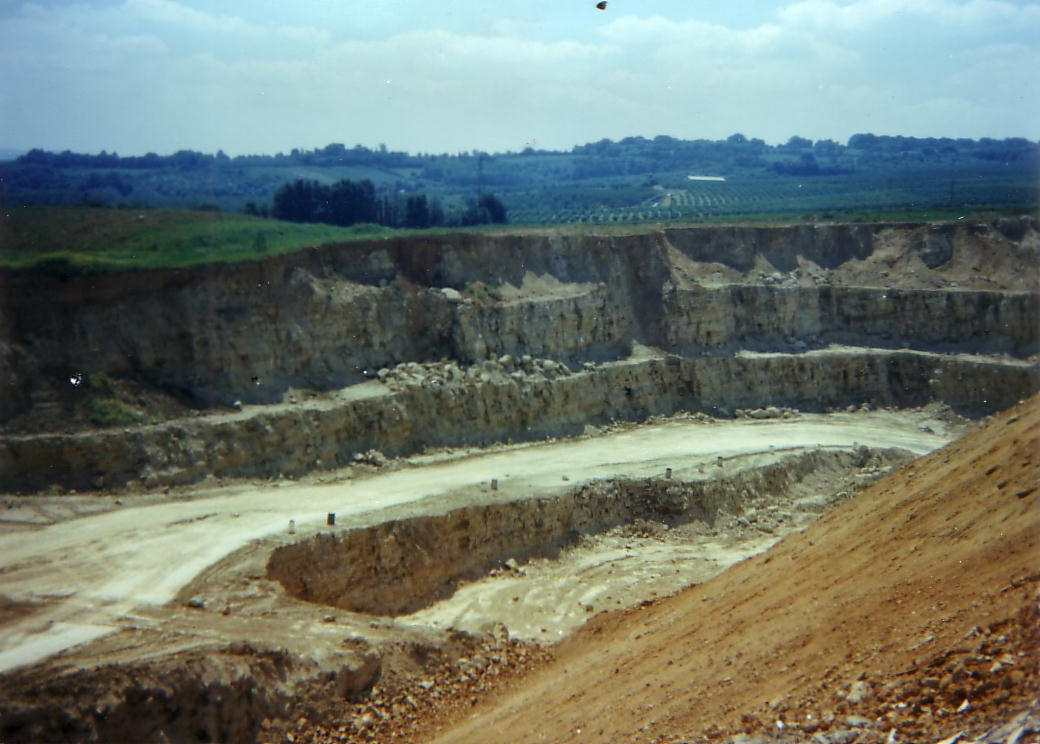
Stangate Quarry, Borough Green, in the 1970s just before quarrying was stopped.

Both sand and ragstone were extracted from this quarry, with some material being used to build Aylesford station in 1856. The railway ran to the quarry where horse-drawn carts delivered rocks to wagons.

Quarrying began at Basted Quarry, moved north through Isles Quarry East, crossed Thong Lan and travelled south as Isles Quarry West, landfilled in the 50s with mixed waste. Quarrying continued south across Mill Lane to become Stangate Quarry. Once the ragstone had been exhausted, the quarry—then known as the ARC (Amalgamated Roadstone Corporation) Stangate Landfill Site—became a landfill site for London waste.

=== Boughton Monchelsea Quarries ===
Boughton Monchelsea was an agricultural settlement with several ragstone quarries which had been worked since Roman times, making use of the river Medway to keep London supplied with building stone. Maidstone architect, John Whichcord, regarded them as “the best ragstone quarries in Kent”. By the 1720s farming had come to predominate in the area as hops, fruit and corn were grown for sale locally and in London. Although the decline of quarrying in the area can be traced to this time, with larger quarries opening elsewhere, the extraction of ragstone from these quarries continued until the 1930s.

The area is also remembered for the so-called "Battle of Boughton Quarry". In October 1830, following crop failures and political unrest, a mob of 500-600 men gathered in the quarries with the intention of marching on Maidstone. They were met by a small military force led by five magistrates and the mayor of Maidstone. The magistrates demanded their dispersal and the ringleaders were seized. When the cavalry appeared, the crowd quickly disappeared. Disturbances continued for the next two years with sporadic incidents of arson and machine breaking.

=== Ditton Court Quarry ===
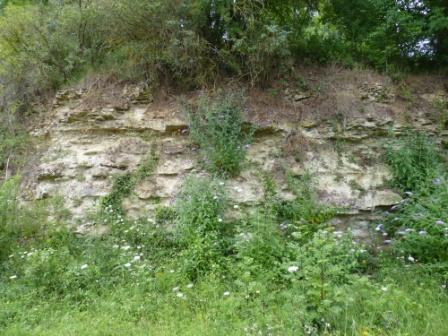
Exposed ragstone and hassock rock face at Ditton Court Quarry

Many ragstone quarries have been abandoned and backfilled once exhausted. When Ditton Quarry closed down in 1984, quarrying operations had left behind a legacy of a lime-rich soil which formed the foundation of a thriving habitat for plants and wildlife; 140 wild flowers (including five that are rare in Kent), 18 butterfly species, and 50 bird species have been recorded. It is also home to foxes, rabbits, frogs, toads and newts. The quarry is now a Site of Nature Conservation Importance (SNCI). Public access is free.

The quarry is also a prime location for geological research and provides opportunities for field studies in a variety of disciplines: sedimentology, stratigraphy, palaeontology, geography, and industrial archaeology. Several features make this a unique location for the study of rock formations. Visitors can examine the extensively exposed rock faces, primarily Kentish Ragstone and Hassock facies, and study changes in vertical and lateral facies. The facies are glauconitic with some horizons of silicification. Shell debris (ammonites, belemnites, nautiloids, bivalves, etc.) and bioturbation are also present. The quarry could be important for future research via gamma ray profiling of the rock beds in relation to changes in sea level and climate.

=== Hay's Depot Yard (TQ 726574) ===
This disused quarry is now the site of the Quarry Wood shopping centre and industrial estate in Aylesford. An old quarry face on the eastern side of the estate is visible and shows the characteristic alternate layers of ragstone and Hassock. It is an important geological site because it allows for lateral variation in the rag and hassock facies to be studied.

=== Hermitage Quarry, Barming & Ditton ===
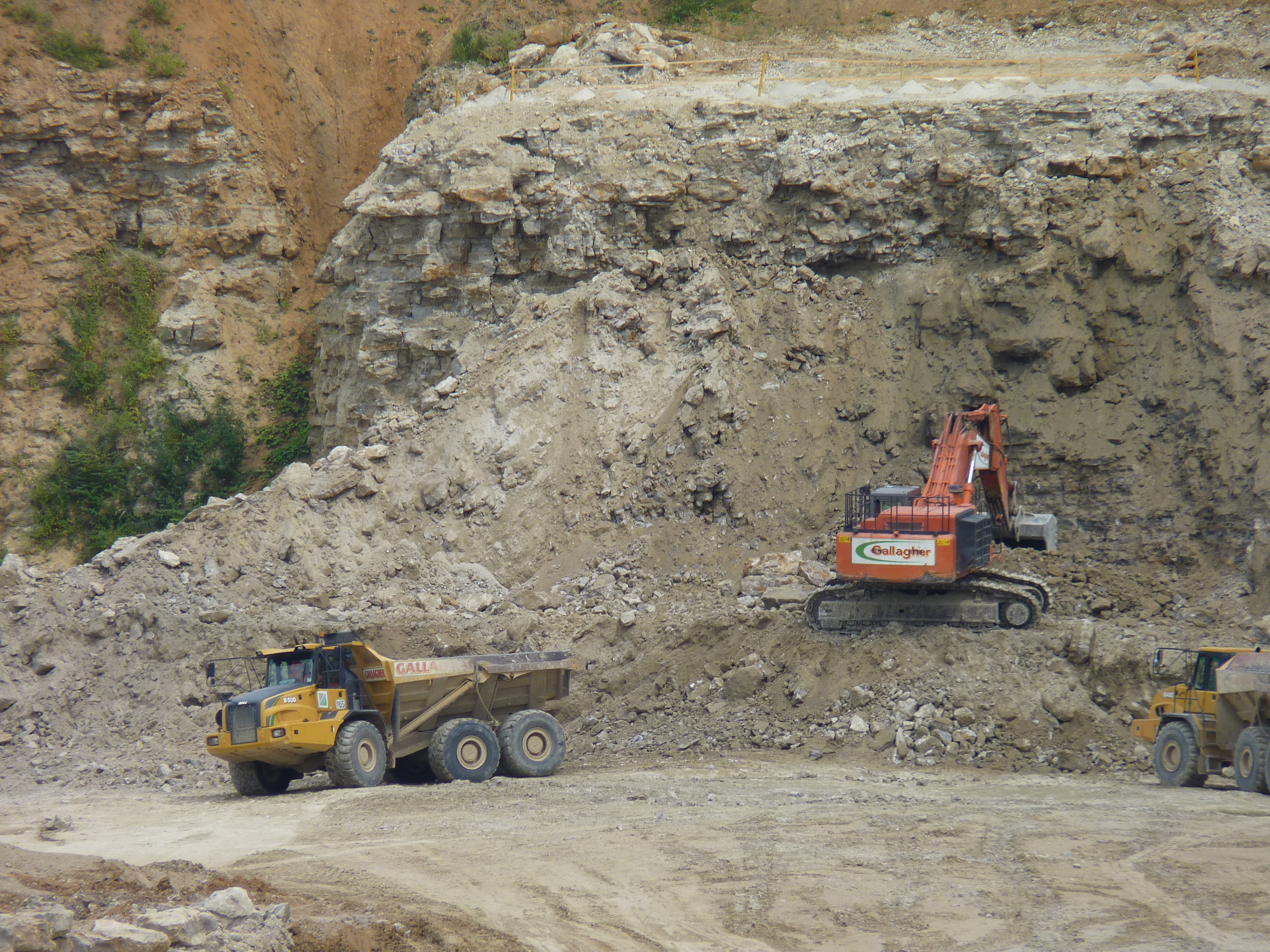
Hermitage Quarry

Quarrying for ragstone is still an important local industry. Gallagher Aggregates Limited operate the Hermitage Quarry, which is situated 1.5 kilometres (0.93 mi) to the south of Ditton village. About 50 employees work in the quarry and another 60 on subsidiary functions. In 2011, it was estimated that at current production levels there was only enough ragstone left in the quarry for another four years' quarrying, with the result that new sources of production were sought. Ragstone in an important material the construction industry for roads and buildings.

In 2011 Gallagher Aggregates applied to extend the Hermitage Quarry into Oaken Wood in the parish of Ditton. The planning committee of Kent County Council granted permission for quarrying in part of the woodland. The decision was confirmed on appeal to the Secretary of State. Planning committee chairman Richard King said that "local residents and environmental groups have argued that the loss of irreplaceable ancient woodland and impact on the local wildlife site is unacceptable. On balance, however, members felt the job prospects and the economic need for ragstone to support construction in the county in future, and benefits of the project, outweighed these objections."

=== Hosey Common, Westerham (TQ 454532) ===
The barred entrance to the disused mines can be found in woods in a shallow valley near the village. Dating from the 17th century, they produced stone for buildings such as Westerham Church. At least four different faces were worked although evidence of other workings is concealed by roof falls. The stone was transported on sledges with a gauge of 14.5ins. Parts of the mine have been backfilled because, it is believed, at times when the price of stone dropped only the best quality stone was excavated, with the poor quality material being stacked in the mine for convenience.

=== Laker House Quarry face, Canning Street, Maidstone (TQ 761569) ===
This is one of two ragstone outcrops that can be found in Maidstone town, and is valuable as an educational site for the earth sciences. At five to seven metres high the vertical face reveals alternating layers of well-cemented, glauconitic shelly limestone (ragstone) and softer weathering, glauconitic calcareous sand (hassock). Silicification and bioturbation are apparent.

=== Loose Quarry, Quarry Wood (TQ 763518) ===
Work at the quarry ceased in the 1940s and the site is currently owned by Loose Scouts Group. Ragstone from the quarry was used for local buildings and also in the construction of the Loose Viaduct in 1830 by Thomas Telford. The quarry is within the 'Boughton Group' of the ragstone. Although abandoned, there is still some evidence of quarry working, such as a central over-burden roadway, overburden and spoil dumps. The rock face is a good example of ragstone and hassock layering together with others less common features resulting from cambering towards Loose Valley, such as jointing, faulting and gulls.

=== Offham Quarry ===
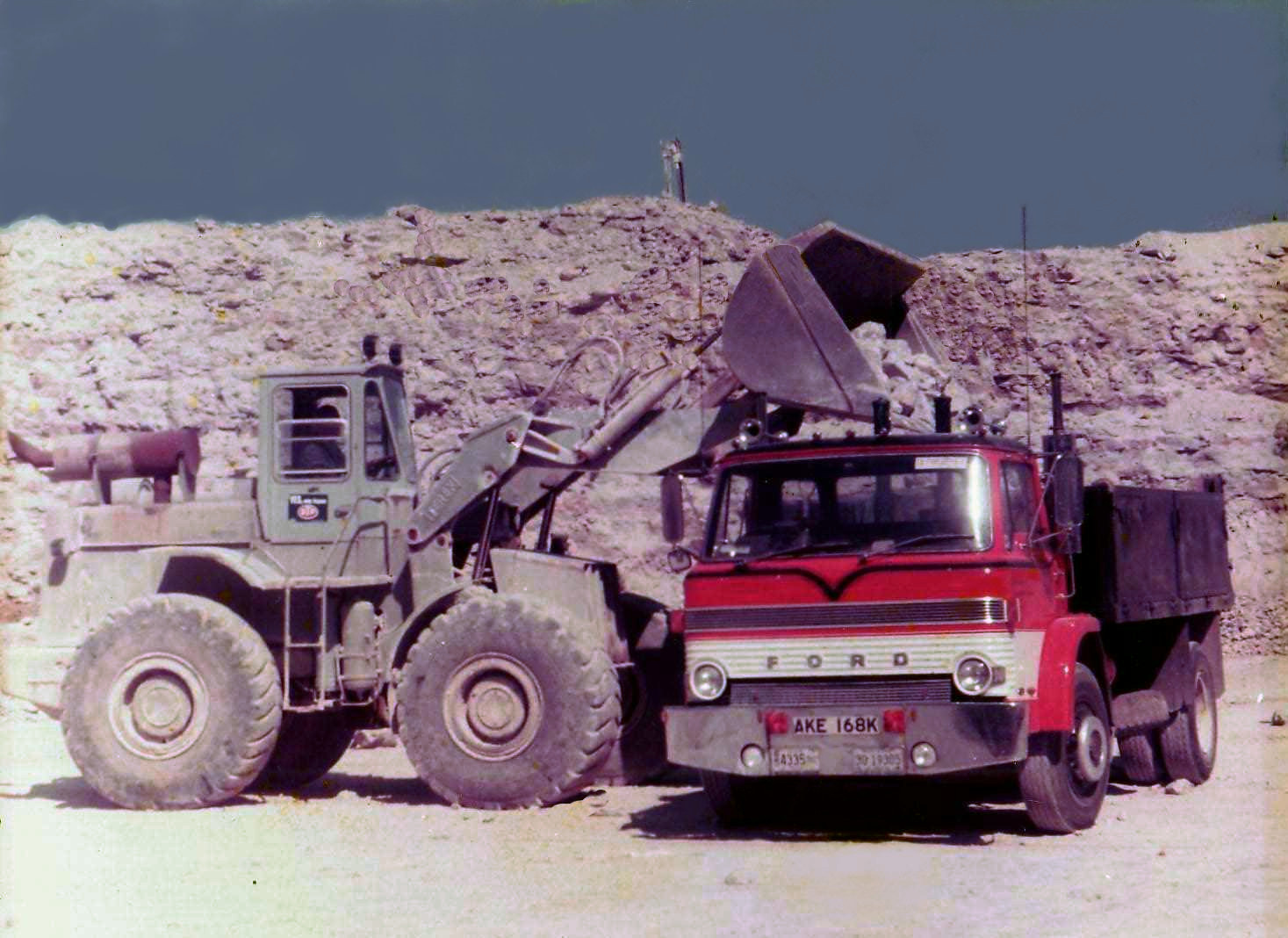
Loading ragstone at Offham Quarry in the 1970s

This quarry originated as a source of supply of aggregate to the road-building and construction industries, and has been used as a landfill site since the early 1980s. It is located south-west of the village and access is gained along the Teston Road. Like Borough Green (Stangate) Quarry, this site was once operated by ARC with trucks bringing domestic, commercial, industrial and inert waste from London to infill the excavated quarry floor.

=== West Farleigh Quarry (TQ 721520) ===
This disused and partly overgrown quarry is in 26 hectares of ancient mixed woodland located near West Farleigh. It provides an important site for the study of cambering (slope movement). Ragstone and hassock layers are well exposed, and the rocks are the same as those in which the fossil remains of an Iguanodon fossil were discovered at Bensted's Quarry, Maidstone. Today it is part of a Nature Reserve.

== See also ==
- List of types of limestone
