= Keepmoat =

Housebuilding company in the United Kingdom

Keepmoat Homes Ltd
- Company type: Private
- Industry: Housebuilding
- Founded: 1931; 95 years ago
- Headquarters: Doncaster, United Kingdom
- Key people: Ian Hoad (CEO)
- Revenue: ▲£778.1 million (2022)
- Operating income: ▼£105.3 million (2022)
- Net income: ▲£79.8 million (2022)
- Parent: Aermont Capital
- Website: www.keepmoat.com

Keepmoat Homes Ltd is a housebuilding company in the United Kingdom that provides private homes for sale. Its headquarters are in Doncaster.

== History ==
The company was founded in Rotherham by George Bramall and Dick Ogden as Bramall & Ogden in 1931. During 1983, Bramall & Ogden acquired the Doncaster-based firm Frank Haslam Milan; the combined business was promptly rebranded as Keepmoat.

By the early 2000s, Keepmoat's annual turnover routinely surpassed £140 million. The company's margins were increasing at this time, and it was heavily pursuing opportunities for growth in the regeneration and social housing markets. In August 2003, it announced that pre-tax profits had doubled to £10.4 million. During the following year, it was awarded one of four roles on a massive regeneration scheme in the center of Liverpool;

During July 2005, the firm announced record results for the fifth year in a row, having reportedly benefitted considerably from the British Government's commitment towards providing sustainable communities. Around this time, senior management were predicting that the margins of private housing were set to decline. Profits continued to rise sharply in subsequent years.

During mid 2007, following an auction process organised by Deloitte, Keepmoat was subject to a management buyout valued at £783 million. Roughly one year later, the company, which had been negatively impacted by the 2008 financial crisis, had become indirectly owned by the British Government amid moves to stabilise the economy. Despite this drastic move, Keepmoat's financial figures remained positive and even reported a 25 percent rise in January 2009 while maintaining its traditional business strategy and annual targets alike.

In January 2010, Keepmoat bought Milnerbuild, a Leeds-based social housing repair and maintenance company. Two years later, Keepmoat completed a merger with social housing provider Apollo, under which both firms maintained separate identities initially. Less than a year after merging with Apollo, a new management structure was implemented, 200 support staff were made redundant, and Ian Sutcliffe, Keepmoat's then-chief executive, parted ways with the company in favour of Dave Sheridan, the former chief executive of Apollo.

During 2012, the firm controversially extended its standard payment term, negatively impacting its supply chain, and reportedly brought at least one subcontractor to the brink of collapse.

In late 2014, Keepmoat was acquired by a pair of London-based private equity firms, TDR Capital and Sun Capital Partners (UK), under a deal with an estimated value of £400 million. In February 2017, Keepmoat sold its regeneration business to the French utility company ENGIE in exchange for £330 million; it had an annual turnover of roughly £800 million and employed 2,500 people at the time of the transaction.

During late 2018, Keepmoat was hit by a £13.2 million loss from its West Midlands sites, which prompted the company to close its offices in that area. The problems hit the company’s overall operating profits, which slid 35.4% to £18.2m in the 12 months to the end of March 2018. During 2019, the company sold 4,035 homes - 1.2 per cent more than the previous 12 months.

In July 2021, Terra Firma Capital Partners was reported to be bidding £700m to buy Keepmoat with a view to combining it with its Kier Living business, which Terra Firma had purchased from the Kier Group in exchange for £110 million only three months earlier.

In late 2021, Aermont Capital completed the purchase of Keepmoat Homes from Sun Capital Partners (UK) and TDR Capital in exchange for £700 million.

In May 2023, Keepmoat announced record results for the year, with a 10.9 per cent boost in revenue, up to £778.1 million. During the following year, the firm's revenue rose by 11 percent, up to £864.6 million, but pre-tax profit declined by 10 percent to £83.2 million.

In June 2025, CEO Tim Beale announced he would be standing down, with Ian Hoad succeeding him as CEO from 1 July 2025.

== Flagship developments ==
The company's flagship developments include:

- Sighthill, Glasgow: The development, which is part of the Sighthill Transformational Regeneration Area, the largest project of its kind outside of London, will feature 824 new homes when it is completed.
- Chase Farm, Gedling: Keepmoat Homes is involved in the creation of thousands of new homes in the Borough of Gedling. Chase Farm is the largest of the borough's planned new developments, with more than 1,000 homes to be built. The land, next to the 240-acre Gedling Country Park, was sold to Keepmoat in 2015.
- Waterside, Leicester: Keepmoat Homes is helping to transform an underused stretch of the Grand Union Canal and creating a new neighbourhood, close to the city.

== Sponsorship ==
Keepmoat was the main sponsor of the Keepmoat Stadium in Doncaster from 2006 to late 2021 .
