= Guy Hands =

English financier and investor (born 1959)

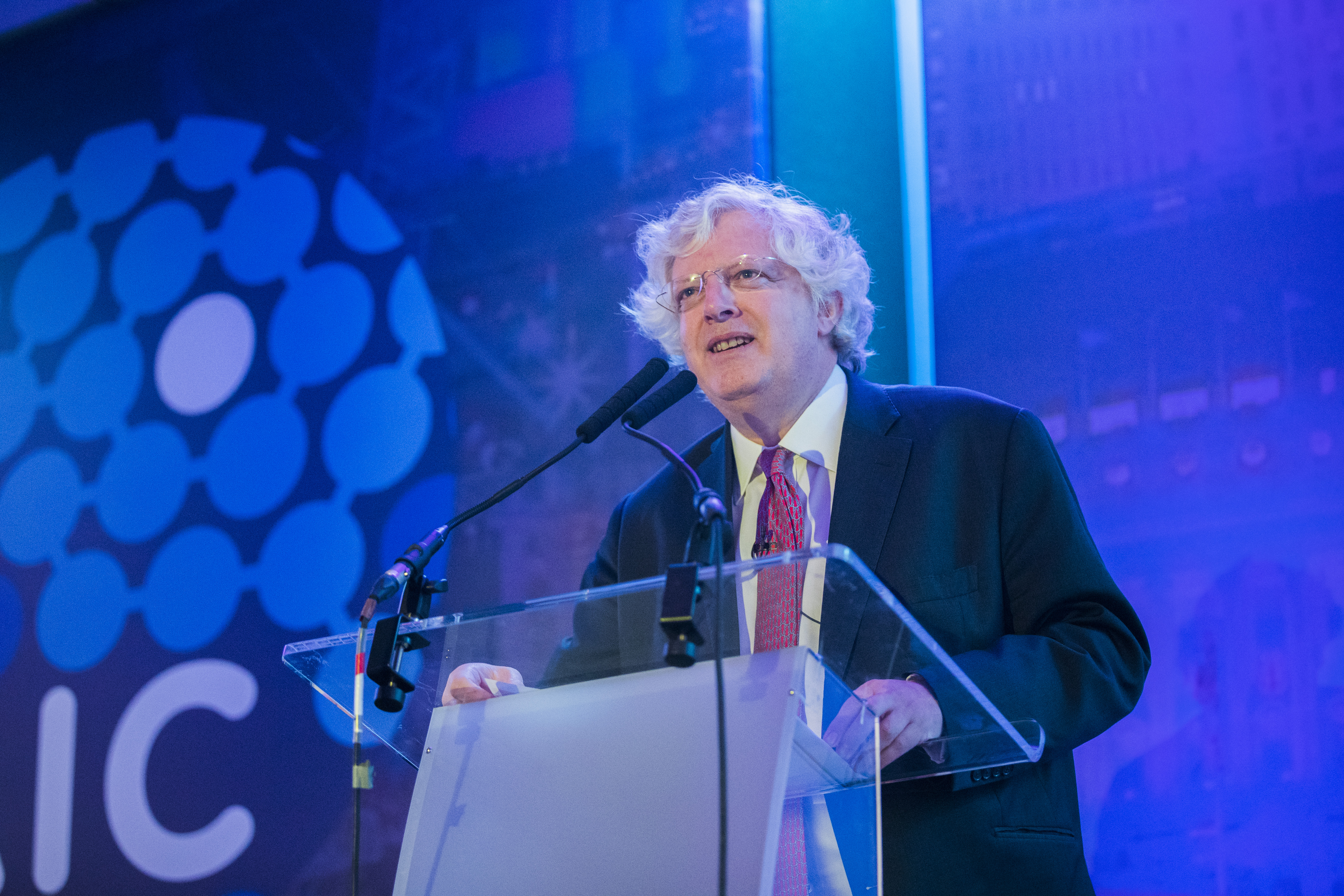
- Hands in 2019
- Born: 27 August 1959 (age 67); London, UK
- Education: The Judd School; Mansfield College, Oxford
- Occupation: Private equity investor
- Employer(s): Terra Firma (2002-2023); Nomura Securities (1994-2002); Goldman Sachs (1982-1994)
- Known for: Founder of Terra Firma Capital Partners, Founder of Nomura Principal Finance Group

Guy Hands (born 27 August 1959) is an English financier and investor. He is most notable as the founder and former chairman of Terra Firma Capital Partners, one of the largest private equity firms in Europe. Hands also was chairman of the UK music company EMI.

Hands is well known for his frequently outspoken comments about the private equity industry. In April 2009, he moved from the UK to Guernsey where Terra Firma is based.

== Biography ==
Hands was born in London, to South African parents, who had lived in Southern Rhodesia. As a small boy he attended Holy Trinity School, Cookham, where he was diagnosed as severely dyslexic. At the age of nine, he was sent to Ravenscroft, a prep school which had a specialist class for dyslexics, and in a Ravenscroft production of Macbeth in 1970 he played the part of Lady Macbeth opposite Christopher Newbury as Macbeth. From there, he went on to The Judd School, at Tonbridge, where there is now a Guy Hands Library.

Hands studied Philosophy, Politics and Economics at Mansfield College, Oxford. While there, he held the office of Bursar of the Oxford Union and was also President of the Oxford University Conservative Association in Michaelmas Term 1980. Hands later provided funding for construction of the Hands Building at Mansfield College.

=== Early career ===
Before arriving at Oxford, Hands started a business selling pictures. Once he was there, it became known as 'Artsake' and employed a number of his fellow students.

Hands started his City career in 1982 as a eurobond trader at Goldman Sachs. He was appointed Head of Eurobond trading in 1986 and later rose to become head of global asset structuring world-wide for Goldman's European division in 1990. In 1994, Hands left Goldman to found Nomura's Principal Finance Group, which focused on European private equity investments. Hands joined Nomura after three other banks, including Goldman, turned down his investment plan. At Nomura, Hands and his team completed over $20 billion of leveraged buyouts. By 2000, Hands was reported to have generated profits for the bank in excess of $1.9 billion, making him a star financier in London. Hands' most notable acquisitions at Nomura included Annington Homes, as well as William Hill, the bookmaker, and Angel Trains, the UK rolling stock company. As well, Hands effectively became the UK's biggest pub landlord through a series of acquisitions in the 1990s. In 1996, Hands played a central role in the sale of the Ministry of Defence's 57,400 homes for military personnel and their families to Annington Homes, which had been established earlier that year as a shell company by Nomura, making Annington the largest owner of residential property in England and Wales.

=== Terra Firma ===
In 2002, Hands founded Terra Firma Capital Partners, as a spinout from Nomura, which he had built into one of the largest private equity investors in Europe. Terra Firma debuted with a €2 billion private equity fund, immediately making it one of the larger private equity investors in Europe.

The firm's early investments, while still a division of Nomura, focused on housing (Annington Homes), leasing companies and pubs. Since 2002, the firm has made major investments in the waste management (Waste Recycling Group), energy (BGCL, East Surrey Holdings, Phoenix Natural Gas), aircraft leasing (AWAS), cinema (Odeon Cinemas/UCI) and music sectors (EMI). TFCP has also made significant investments in German residential housing (Deutsche Annington) and motorway services (Tank & Rast).

Terra Firma is now also one of the world's leading private equity investors in renewable energy. Its investments include the UK-based green energy business (Infinis), a US wind energy business (EverPower) and an Italian solar energy business (RTR).

Hands and Terra Firma are also known for the failed investment in British music company EMI, which was later taken over by Citigroup, the main lender in the investment. Citigroup took ownership of EMI Group from Terra Firma on 1 February 2011, wiping out the firm's investments and writing off £2.2 billion of debt. Despite implementing an operational turnaround, Terra Firma was reported to have lost $2.5 billion in the EMI transaction, representing roughly one-third of Terra Firma's investor's capital as well as more than 60% of Hands' personal net worth. Hands had spent much of 2010 engaged in litigation with Citigroup, claiming the bank engaged in fraud during its auction of EMI in 2007. The lawsuit went to trial in New York in late 2010 and resulted in a jury finding in favour of Citigroup. This verdict was however overturned in May 2013, after a US federal appeals court found that the American trial judge, Jed Rakoff, had incorrectly instructed the jury on a point of English law.

A new, judge-led trial was heard by Mr Justice Burton in London in June 2016. After two days of evidence, during which Hands admitted on more than one occasion that he didn't have 'that memory anymore', lawyers for Terra Firma withdrew the case with all costs to be borne by Terra Firma. Burton said: "I’m sure this is the right result". Citi said: "We have always maintained that the allegations made by Terra Firma were entirely baseless." Hands said the claims had been brought in good faith, but that documentation and memories of these events after nine years was no longer sufficient to meet the high demands of proof required, and that the matter is now closed.

In August 2023, it was announced that Hands was retiring from Terra Firma as Chairman and Chief Investment Officer in order to meet his long-term goal of retiring by his 64th birthday, as per the Beatles song. Hands remains involved in the Terra Firma portfolio businesses that are Hands family investments.

In 2024, the Financial Times reported that a number of Terra Firma employees, over the period 2002–2023, accused Hands of humiliating staff, raging at staff, and repeatedly telling sexually explicit stories at work.

=== Other businesses ===
Hands and his wife own Hand Picked Hotels, a chain of 21 English country house properties, which is run by Julia Hands.

In 2017, Guy and Julia Hands agreed to acquire McDonald's Nordic operations. The Nordic countries consisted of approximately 435 restaurants, 95% of which are franchised. The deal would see Hands become the developmental licensee and master franchiser for McDonald's in the region.

In December 2020, Hands took a stake in ROXi, as part of a £13 million fundraiser led by Sun Capital Partners, a company managed by Hugh Osmond, the former owner of PizzaExpress and Center Parcs. ROXi had been founded by Rob Lewis in 2014.

== Personal life ==
While at Oxford, Hands became a friend of William Hague, who in 1984 was best man at his wedding to Julia Caroline Ablethorpe. The couple have two sons and two daughters. His wife's house in Kent, just outside Sevenoaks, was once presented to Winston Churchill, while their estate in Tuscany, Villa Saletta, produces wine and olive oil. The estate's wines have won numerous international awards.

In April 2009, in protest at high British taxes, Hands moved to Guernsey in the Channel Islands. It was reported in February 2010 that since then he had not visited the United Kingdom, and that members of his family were travelling to Guernsey to see him. In 2014, the Canadian writer Malcolm Gladwell called the move to Guernsey an "incredibly interesting pathology", viewing departure into tax exile as a significant reverse for Hands to set against the benefits of being immensely wealthy.

In May 2019, Hands admitted to The Sunday Times that he had a food addiction to roast potatoes and gravy and that he had sought treatment from hypnosis to combat it.

In 2021, Hands published ‘The Dealmaker: Lessons from a Life in Private Equity’, a personal account of his experiences from childhood to dealmaking. The Times labelled it as ‘the only book about private equity to read like a thriller’.

Hands has been increasingly vocal about the risks associated with climate change continuing and the huge difficulties and costs involved in stopping it.

=== Philanthropy ===
Hands and his wife have donated millions of pounds to Mansfield College, Oxford since 1995. Mansfield hosts an annual Hands Lecture series. Since 2014, the Hands family has donated £2.2 million towards Mansfield's Love Lane building, which will house the University's new Institute of Human Rights.

Hands was named the 2018 Philanthropist of The Year at the annual Spear's Wealth Management Awards for his contributions to a number of charities.

=== Honours and appointments ===
- 2000 - elected a Global Leader of Tomorrow of the World Economic Forum
- President of Access for Excellence
- Bancroft Fellow of Mansfield College, Oxford
- Member of the University of Oxford Chancellor's Court of Benefactors
- Fellow of the Duke of Edinburgh's Award Scheme
