= Paul Coffey (businessman) =

British businessman

Paul Coffey (born 13 September 1969) is a British businessman, and the ex Chief Executive of npower.

== Early life ==
From 1993 to 1995 he did an HNC in Business and Finance at the University of Northumbria at Newcastle (became Northumbria University in 2002). From 1995 to 1997 he did a BSc in Business and Finance at the University of Sunderland.

== Career ==
He joined Northern Electric in 1989, working with them for around a decade.

=== npower ===
He joined npower in 2002, the same year it was taken over by RWE of Germany. He became chief executive of RWE npower in October 2015, where he was ultimately replaced on November 29, 2019, as part of Eon's takeover of npower's parent company Innogy.

== Personal life ==
He originates from North East England.

== See also ==
- Tony Cocker, chief executive since January 2012 of E.ON UK
- Vincent de Rivaz, chief executive since 2003 of EDF Energy
- Peter Terium, chief executive since July 2012 of RWE

Business positions
Preceded by Paul Massara	Chief Executive of RWE npower October 2015 -	Succeeded by Mike Lewis (E.ON UK CEO)
Preceded by	Chief Operating Officer of RWE npower April 2015 – September 2015	Succeeded by
Preceded by	Chief Operating Officer of RWE Innogy GmbH; October 2009 – March 2015	Succeeded by
