= Tony Cocker =

Anthony David Cocker (born 26 April 1959) was the chief executive of E.ON UK, one of the Big Six UK energy providers. He is also a chairman of Infinis Energy Management Limited's board.

== Early life ==
He was born in the Borough of Fylde, Lancashire. He has a younger brother.

He read mathematics at Lincoln College, Oxford, gaining a BA in 1981 and D.Phil. in 1984. His doctorate researched the shape of water droplets. He later studied at International Institute for Management Development (IMD) in Lausanne in 1988.

== Career ==
He worked for L.E.K. Consulting from 1984 to 1992, then Bass Brewery.

=== Powergen ===
He joined Powergen in 1997 as head of corporate strategy. In August 2001 he became managing director of Energy Trading, replacing Nick Horler. Powergen was acquired by E.ON in 2002.

=== E.ON ===
In 2008 he became at chief executive of E.ON Energy Trading in Düsseldorf. It was announced in September 2011 that he would become chief executive of E.ON UK, taking that role in January 2012.

In 2015, he earned £908,000.

=== Infinis ===
Tony was appointed chairman and non-executive director on 1 August 2017, having retired from E.ON in July 2017.

=== SSE ===
In April 2018, Cocker joined SSE plc. as a non-executive director.

== Personal life ==
He is married with a son (born in November 2000) and daughter (born in August 1998). He married Madeleine Parker in September 1991 in Oxford. He lives in Warwickshire.

== See also ==
- Johannes Teyssen, chief executive of E.ON since May 2010
- Paul Coffey, chief executive of npower since August 2015
- Vincent de Rivaz, chief executive since 2003 of EDF Energy
- Ed Wallis, former chief executive of Powergen
- Category:Electric power companies of the United Kingdom

Business positions
Preceded by Paul Golby	Chief Executive of E.ON UK; January 2012 -	Incumbent
Preceded by	Chief Executive of E.ON Energy Trading; 2008 - December 2011	Succeeded by
