= Terra Firma Capital Partners =

UK-based private equity firm

Terra Firma Capital Partners Limited
- Type: Private
- Industry: Private equity
- Predecessor: Nomura Principal Finance Group
- Founded: 2002; 24 years ago
- Founder: Guy Hands
- Headquarters: London, United Kingdom
- Key people: Guy Hands (chairman); Vivek Ahuja (CEO)
- Products: Investments, private equity funds
- Total assets: €11 billion
- Number of employees: 100+
- Website: terrafirma.com

Terra Firma Capital Partners Limited is a British private equity firm. Financier Guy Hands founded the firm in 2002 through the spin-off of Nomura Principal Finance Group. The firm, which traces its roots to the formation of its predecessor in 1994, has invested over €14 billion since inception.

Terra Firma invests across a range of sectors and has focused on leveraged buyouts of large, asset-rich businesses, often with complex structural or regulatory issues. The firm often targets under-performing businesses in need of strategic, operational, or management change.

Terra Firma is headquartered in London with offices in Guernsey and Beijing. It has a staff of over 90 employees.

== History ==
=== 1994–2006: Founding and early history ===
Terra Firma (solid Earth) traces its origins to 1994 when Guy Hands formed Nomura Principal Finance Group, which focused on European private equity investments. Hands joined Nomura after three other banks, including his previous employer Goldman Sachs, turned down his investment plan. At Nomura, Hands and his team completed over $20 billion of leveraged buyouts. By 2000, Hands was reported to have generated profits for the bank in excess of $1.9 billion making him a star financier in London. The group's most notable previous acquisitions included Annington Homes, as well as William Hill, the UK bookmaker, and Angel Trains, the UK rolling stock company.

Terra Firma logo used by the firm from its founding 2002 through 2006, when fundraising began for TFCP III

In 2002, with support from Nomura, Hands completed a spin-out of the bank's private equity operations to form Terra Firma, after first contemplating a move to another major financial institution. The previous year, there had been reports that Nomura had too much of its capital invested in the Principal Finance Group and that Hands' profile was overshadowing the bank. The existing portfolio of investments that the Principal Finance Group at Nomura held from 1994 through 2002 was transferred to a new fund named Terra Firma Capital Partners I and Terra Firma continued to manage those investments for Nomura. Nomura also provided a cornerstone commitment to Terra Firma's first independent fund, Terra Firma Capital Partners II.

In 2004, Terra Firma completed fundraising for its first private equity fund with over €2 billion in investor commitments. The firm had closed on its first €1 billion of capital by late 2002, only a matter of a few months after launching the firm, but amidst a difficult fundraising environment required more than a year to finish fundraising. Investors in the fund included Wilshire Associates, Partners Group, Horsley Bridge, Adams Street Partners, NIB Capital, Citigroup and Canada Pension Plan. At the time, this represented the largest debut fund for a European private equity firm. The firm had completed its first transaction as an independent firm in mid-2003 with the £315 million acquisition of Waste Recycling Group, the largest operator of landfills in the UK.

Terra Firma closed its second independent fund, Terra Firma Capital Partners III in June 2007 with approximately €5.4 billion of investor commitments. The closing of the fund coincided with the announcement of the firm's ill-fated investment in EMI just weeks earlier and a high-profile attempt to acquire UK chemist Alliance Boots, which was ultimately acquired by Kohlberg Kravis Roberts & Co. In raising Terra Firma Capital III, the firm made a strong display of avoiding "club deals", transactions completed alongside other private equity firms. In addition to presenting what was described as unique investment opportunities, Terra Firma was active in providing equity co-investment opportunities to limited partner investors in its funds.

Terra Firma was the first large private equity firm based in the UK to comply with the Walker Guidelines on transparency and disclosure. In April 2008, the firm published its first ever Annual Review, which exceeded the Walker reporting requirements and set a standard for voluntary private equity reporting in the UK.

Terra Firma has endorsed the Institutional Limited Partners Association (ILPA)'s private equity principles and is a signatory to the United Nations Principles for Responsible Investment.

=== 2007–2011: EMI investment ===
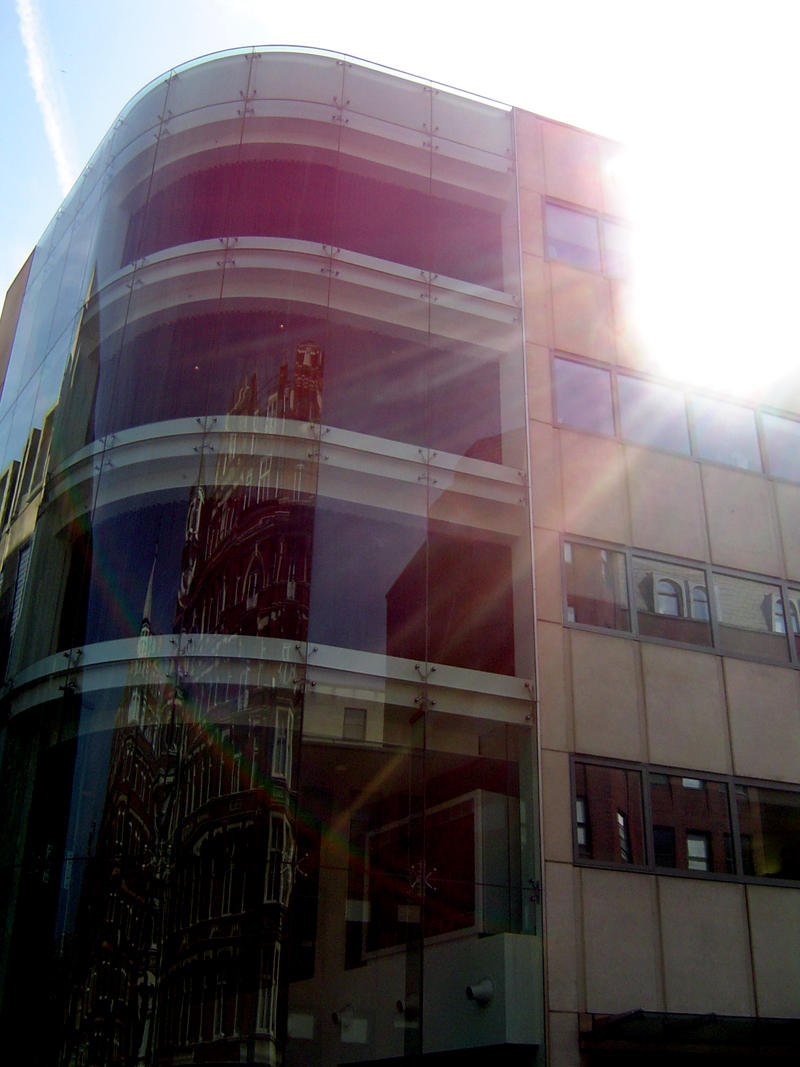
The head office of EMI in London; Terra Firma acquired EMI in 2007 and lost control of the company in 2011

Terra Firma acquired EMI in a $4.7 billion (£2.4 billion) public-to-private buyout transaction in August 2007. It was one of the last large European buyouts completed before the 2008 financial crisis. Terra Firma invested in the deal through its TFCP II and TFCP III funds, and also included a number of equity co-investors in the transaction.

Following the transition, several important artists including Radiohead walked away from the label, while other artists such as Paul McCartney left ahead of the takeover. At the same time, The Rolling Stones signed a one-album deal with Interscope Records/Universal Music Group outside of its contract with EMI, which expired in February 2008. Thirty Seconds to Mars and Joss Stone attempted to leave EMI due to their dissatisfaction with the Terra Firma takeover but EMI threatened legal action against them for breach of contract. Under Terra Firma's ownership, EMI also signed several significant new acts, including Tinie Tempah, Eliza Doolittle, David Guetta, Lady Antebellum and Professor Green.

Around the same time, EMI announced restructuring plans to cut between 1,500 and 2,000 jobs and to reduce costs by £200 million a year. As a result, the UK chief executive Tony Wadsworth left EMI shortly after the buyout.

By the fall of 2008, the firm's investment in EMI was clearly troubled with a large debt load and weak earnings In early 2009, Terra Firma wrote down the value of its investment by €1.37 billion, approximately 46% of its original value. However, Terra Firma and Hands personally continued to put new money into the company in order to avoid a default under its loan obligations to lender, Citigroup. By 2010, it was reported that Hands had invested between 60% and 70% of his personal net worth in the EMI transaction.

In December 2009, Terra Firma filed a lawsuit against EMI's primary lender Citigroup, claiming the bank engaged in fraud during its auction of the company in 2007. The lawsuit went to trial in New York in late 2010 and resulted in a jury finding in favor of Citigroup and against Terra Firma.

Citigroup took ownership of EMI Group from Terra Firma on 1 February 2011, wiping out the firm's investments and writing off £2.2 billion of debt. Terra Firma was reported to have lost $2.5 billion in the EMI transaction, representing roughly one-third of Terra Firma's investor's capital as well as more than 60% of Hands' personal net worth.

In May 2013, the verdict from the New York trial was overturned on appeal and a new trial announced, after it was found that the American trial Judge, Jed Rakoff, had incorrectly instructed the jury. The US federal appeals court noted that "because the district court's jury instructions were based on an inaccurate understanding of the relevant English law, the case must be vacated and remanded for a new trial.

A new judge-led trial is due to take place in London in June 2016. The original claim that Citi had lied about the presence of a rival bidder in the auction for EMI, which led Terra Firma to bid for the music group, will be heard by the English court. Filings show that a new, additional claim, that Citi failed to disclose relevant information about EMI's finances, will also be heard.

=== 2011–present: Post-EMI ===
In mid-2011, months after the loss of EMI, Terra Firma began speaking with potential investors about the firm's next fund, Terra Firma Capital Partners IV, targeting to raise upwards of £2.5 billion, which would be roughly half the size of its predecessor which raised £4.8 billion. With the exception of EMI, the balance of Terra Firma's current fund was reportedly performing well, although the fund was still under water. In November 2011, Terra Firma was reported to be in discussions with a sovereign wealth fund about a new capital commitment to allow the firm to continue investing after the end of the investment period of TFCP III. In March 2012 they bought The Garden Centre Group and July of the same year bought Four Seasons Health Care. In December 2012 the acquisition of Annington Homes was completed.

In July 2013, Terra Firma partially exited Deutsche Annington, Germany's largest private landlord, through an IPO on the Frankfurt Stock Exchange. It later fully exited the company in May 2014 through a distribution in specie to investors in the Terra Firma Deutsche Annington fund.

In August 2013, Terra Firma sold Phoenix Natural Gas to funds managed by Hastings, the Australian infrastructure fund manager.

In September 2015, Terra Firma appointed Justin King as vice-chairman. That same month is also completed the sale of German motorway services operator Tank & Rast to a consortium led by Allianz SE. Terra Firma Chairman and CIO Guy Hands announced in 2015 that the firm will only charge investors on money which has been invested in deals, rather than the industry norm of charging fees on all committed capital, an approach described as a "radical break with industry conventions". In September 2016, Terra Firma Capital Partners appointed Andrew Géczy as Chief Executive Officer. Géczy joined Terra Firma from Australia & New Zealand Banking Group (ANZ), where he was previously CEO of International and Institutional Banking. Guy Hands lent £4.5m to Andrew Géczy when he became the chief executive of Terra Firma and claims Géczy has not repaid the loan. In February 2017, Terra Firma Capital Partners started a sale process for its wind-energy business in the United States.

== Investments ==
Between 1994 and 2011, Terra Firma and its predecessor invested approximately €13 billion in equity and completed transactions with an aggregate enterprise value of €44 billion.

Terra Firma is known for its failed investment in British music company EMI, which was later taken over by Citigroup, the main lender in the investment.

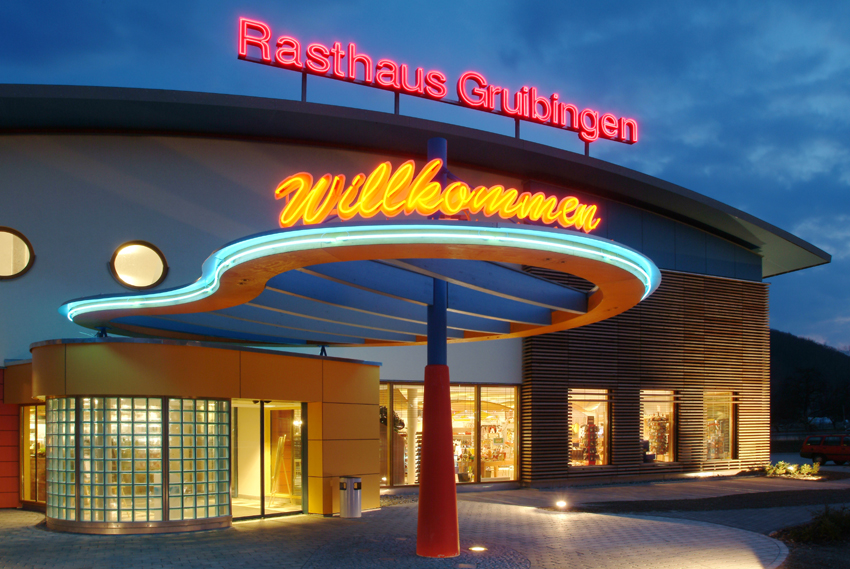
Tank & Rast owned rest stop along the Autobahn in Germany

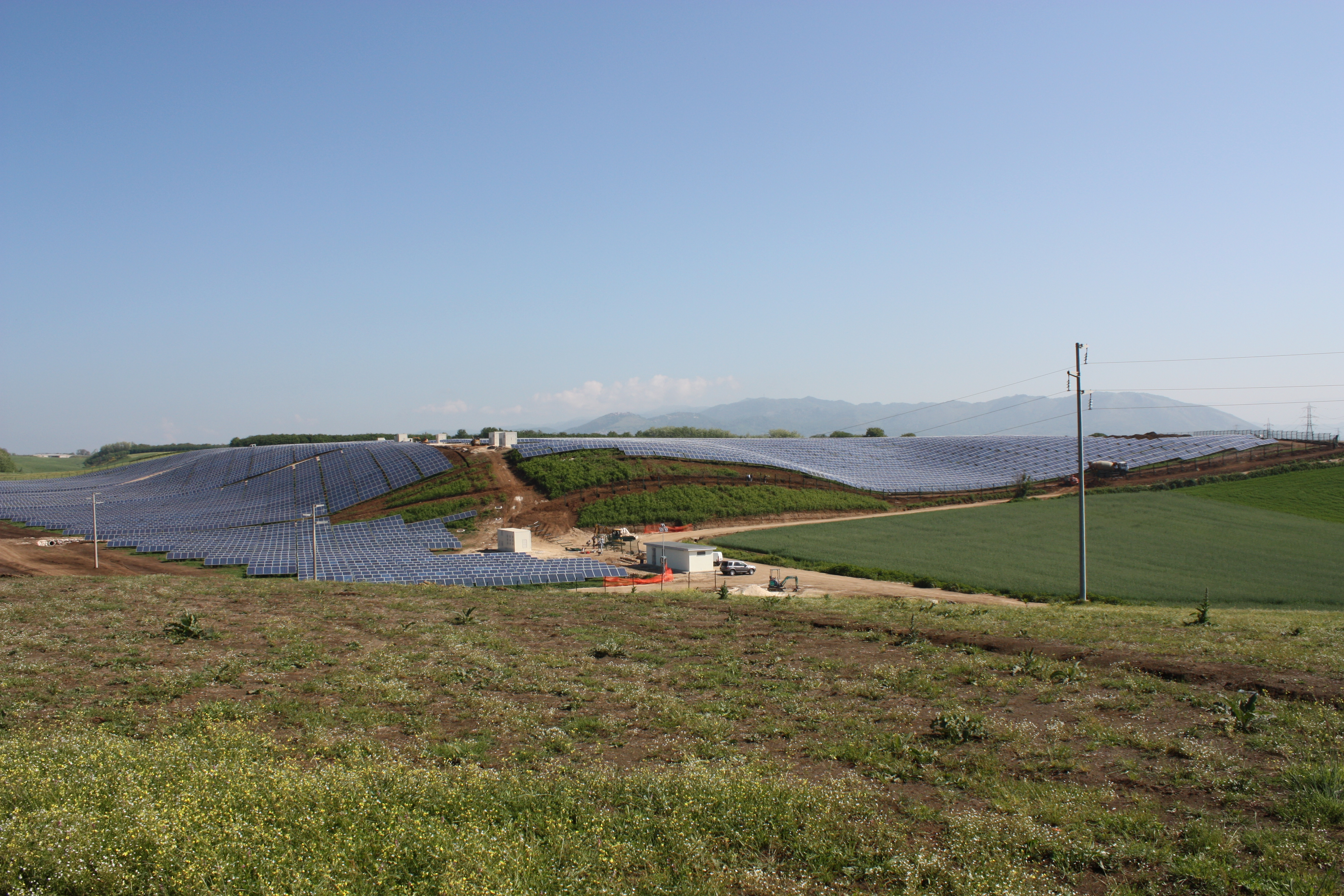
An RTR solar energy installation in Italy

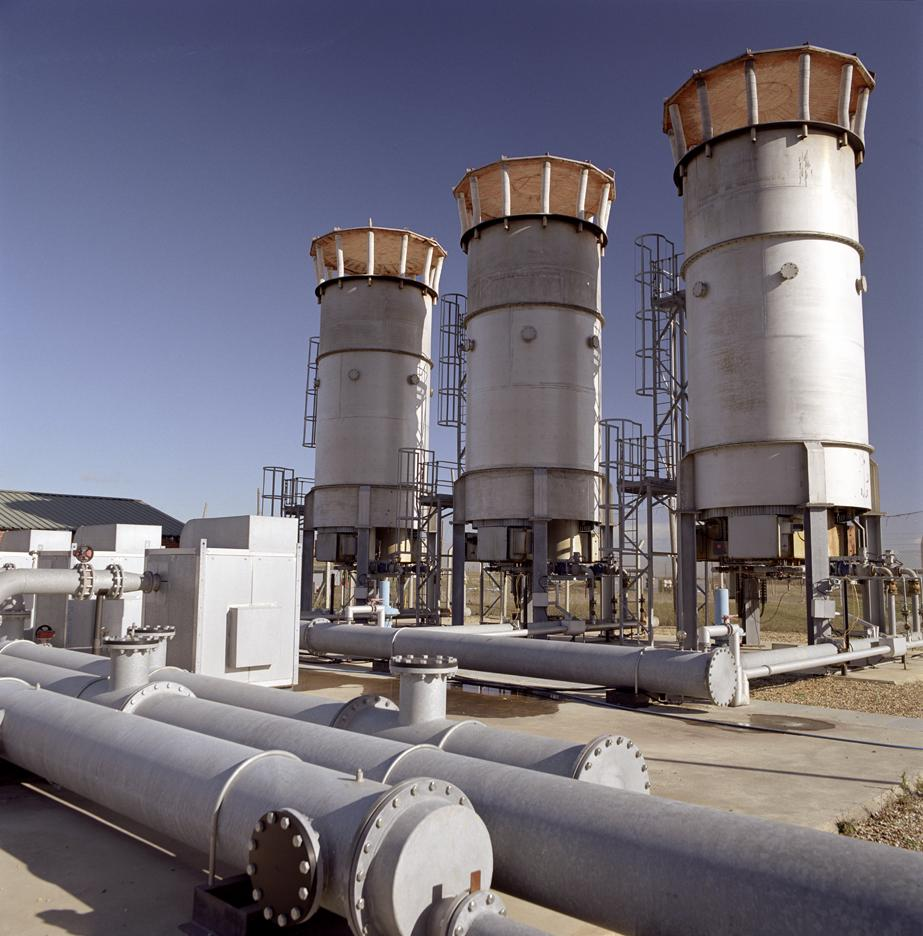
An Infinis Ltd. waste-to-energy processing plant

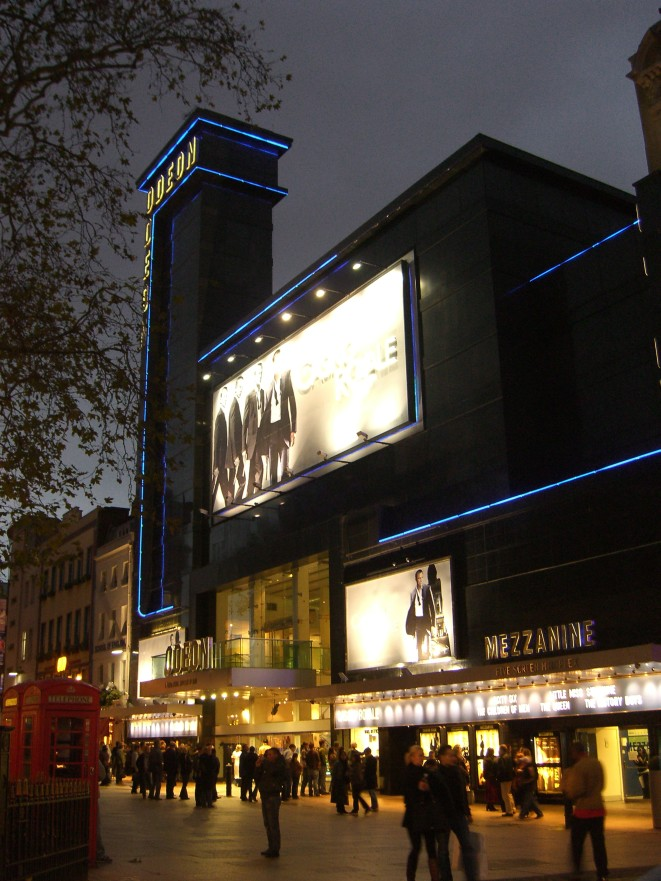
The flagship Odeon cinema in Leicester Square, London

The firm's early investments, while still a division of Nomura, focused on housing (Annington Homes), leasing companies and pubs. Since 2002, the firm has made major investments in the waste management (Waste Recycling Group), energy (BGCL, East Surrey Holdings, Phoenix Natural Gas, and Infinis), aircraft leasing (AWAS), cinema (Odeon Cinemas/UCI) and music sectors (EMI). TFCP has also made significant investments in German residential housing (Deutsche Annington) and motorway services (Tank & Rast).

In 2015 Terra Firma announced its intention to sell the Odeon/UCI cinema group for a reported £1 billion. In July 2016, the company was bought for $921 million by the American company AMC Theatres, owned by Chinese conglomerate Wanda Group. The deal received approval from the European Commission on 17 November 2016, and was completed on 30 November 2016.

Terra Firma has been an active investor in renewable energy. Its investments include Infinis, a UK independent pure green energy business, EverPower, a U.S. based wind energy business and RTR, an Italian solar energy business.

In April 2021, Terra Firma purchased Kier Living, the housing arm of the Kier Group, for £110m, rebranding it as Tilia Homes in June 2021. The following month, Terra Firma was reported to be bidding £700m to buy Keepmoat Homes with a view to combining it with the former Kier Living business. Terra Firma then planned to acquire another house builder, Hopkins Homes, valued at around £300 million. The acquisition was completed in January 2022. In October 2024, Terra Firma merged Tilia Homes with its Hopkins Homes subsidiary, naming the merged business 'Untypical'.

=== Investment funds ===
Since founding in 1994, Terra Firma has raised five private equity funds.

- Terra Firma Capital Partners I (TFCP I) was formed in 2002 to house the assets that had been acquired from 1994 through 2002, while the team was still part of Nomura. Nomura was the sole investor in this fund.
- Terra Firma Capital Partners II (TFCP II), the firm's first independent fund, was closed in February 2004 with €2.1 billion of investor commitments. In addition to Nomura, which made a cornerstone investment, the fund raised capital from 65 investors from 21 countries.
- Terra Firma Deutsche Annington (TFDA) was formed in 2006 to house the firm's German housing investments Deutsche Annington (DAIG). The firm raised €2.1 billion of investor commitments from 21 investors.
- Terra Firma Capital Partners III (TFCP III) was closed in May 2007 with €5.4 billion of investor commitments. The fund's limited partnership comprises 159 investors from 26 countries.
- Terra Firma Special Opportunities Fund I (TFSOFI) closed in December 2012 and is a single asset fund raised to acquire Annington Homes from Nomura. TFSOFI raised a total of £470 million from investors around the world, both institutional and private.

In mid-2011, Terra Firma began speaking with potential investors about the firm's next fund, Terra Firma Capital Partners IV. Terra Firma is targeting to raise upwards of £2.5 billion, which would be roughly half the size of its predecessor with raised £4.8 billion.

=== Portfolio companies ===
The following are among the firm's most notable current and former portfolio companies:

| Company | Sector | Status | Fund | Investment year | Exit year | Deal size |
|---|---|---|---|---|---|---|
| Phoenix Inns | Pubs | Historical | TFCP I | 1995 | 2001 | €374m |
| Angel Trains | Rolling stock company | Historical | TFCP I | 1996 | 1999 | €1,035m |
| Annington Homes | Housing | Current | TFCP I | 1996 | Present | €2,570m |
| AWAS Aviation Capital | Aircraft leasing | Current | TFCP II/III | 2006 | Present | €5,677m |
| BGCL | Utilities | Historical | TFCP II | 2005 | 2006 | €141m |
| Consolidated Pastoral Company | Agriculture | Current | TFCP III | 2009 | Present | €327m |
| Deutsche Annington (DAIG) | Housing | Historical | TFDA | 2000 | 2014 | €8,750m |
| EMI | Media | Historical | TFCP II/III | 2007 | 2011 | €6,026m |
| EverPower | Energy | Current | TFCP III | 2009 | Present | €443m |
| First Quench Retailing | Retail | Historical | TCP I | 2000 | 2007 | €357m |
| Four Seasons Health Care | Healthcare | Current | TFCP III | 2012 | Present | €1,015m |
| Hyder Business Services (HBS) | Outsourcing | Historical | TFCP I | 2000 | 2008 | €150m |
| Infinis | waste-to-energy | Current | TFCP II | 2003 | 2016 | €122m |
| Inn Partnership | Pubs | Historical | TFCP I | 1999 | 2002 | €578m |
| Inntrepreneur | Pubs | Historical | TFCP I | 1997 | 2005 | €1,914m |
| Le Méridien | Hotels | Historical | TFCP I | 2000 | 2005 | €3,485m |
| Odeon Cinemas | Cinemas | Historical | TFCP II | 2004 | 2016 | €650m |
| RTR | Energy | Current | TFCP III | 2011 | Present | €755m |
| Shanks Group plc | Waste management | Historical | TFCP I | 2004 | 2006 | €357m |
| Tank & Rast | Motorway services | Historical | TFCP II | 2004 | 2016 | €1,104m |
| Thorn Electrical Industries | Consumer goods rental | Historical | TFCP I | 1998 | 2007 | €1,603m |
| Unique Pub Company | Pubs | Historical | TFCP I | 1999 | 2002 | €1,359m |
| United Cinemas International | Cinemas | Historical | TFCP II | 2004 | 2016 | €350m |
| Voyager Pubs | Pubs | Historical | TFCP I | 2001 | 2004 | €984m |
| Waste Recycling Group | Waste management | Historical | TFCP II | 2003 | 2006 | €735m |
| William Hill plc | Services - bookmakers | Historical | TFCP I | 1997 | 1999 | €1,104m |
| Wyevale Garden Centres | Leisure | Historical | TFCP III | 2012 | | €331m |

== Philanthropy ==
Terra Firma Capital Partners Limited donates 10% of its annual pre-tax profits each year to charity.

Terra Firma is a founding member of the Private Equity Foundation, an organisation which aims to invest the capital and expertise of the private equity community into charities to help them achieve their strategic goals.

In 2002, Terra Firma and its employees set up the Terra Firma Charitable Trust, a non-profit charitable fund which aims to make charitable investments that directly benefit the local community in the borough of Southwark. Terra Firma has donated more than £1.6 million to local charities through this Trust.
