= Kier Group =

British construction, services and property group

Kier Group plc
- Type: Public limited company
- Traded as: LSE: KIE
- Industry: Construction, Civil engineering, Support services, Property management
- Founded: 1928
- Headquarters: 81 Fountain Street, Manchester
- Key people: Matthew Lester, Chairman; Stuart Togwell, CEO
- Revenue: ▲£4,393.0 million (2026)
- Operating income: ▲£118.7 million (2026)
- Net income: ▲£61.8 million (2026)
- Number of employees: 10,000 (2026)
- Website: www.kier.co.uk

Kier Group plc is a British construction, services and property group active in building and civil engineering, support services, and the Private Finance Initiative.

Founded in 1928 in Stoke-on-Trent it initially specialised in concrete engineering before expanding into general contracting and housebuilding. Kier was listed as a public company on the London Stock Exchange from 1963 until it was acquired by Beazer in 1986. After a period under the ownership of Hanson plc, it was bought out by its management in 1992, expanded its housing interests, and was relisted on the London Stock Exchange in 1996.

During the early 21st century, it expanded through acquisitions, and, following the January 2018 collapse of rival Carillion, Kier was briefly ranked, by turnover, as the second biggest UK construction contractor, behind Balfour Beatty. It was then a constituent of the FTSE 250 Index. However, its share price plunged following a failed rights issue in late 2018, and by mid 2019 was suffering such deep losses that analysts considered Kier might "go bust". After an extensive restructuring, debt reduction, cost-cutting and disposals programme, which included shedding 1,700 employees and selling its Bedfordshire headquarters and its public and private housebuilding arm, Kier Living, the company scraped back into profit in 2021, and rebuilt its financial position. It remains listed on the London Stock Exchange and is a constituent of the FTSE 250 Index.

== History ==
=== Foundation ===
The company was founded by Jorgen Lotz and Olaf Kier, Danish engineers, under the name Lotz & Kier in 1928, and it was based in Stoke-on-Trent.

A few years later Lotz withdrew from the company, but Olaf Kier retained a semblance of his identity by including Lotz's initials in the organisation's new name, J.L. Kier & Co Ltd, which remained the company's principal title for over four decades.

=== Pre-World War II ===
By the late 1930s Kier had moved its head office to Belgravia in Westminster, and thereby became neighbours to many of Britain's leading construction engineering consultants and contractors, who had formed a substantial coterie in Westminster for professionals and businessmen engaged in civil engineering. Immediate neighbours included Marples Ridgeway (builders of Hammersmith Flyover) and Edmund Nuttall (builders of both Mersey road tunnels).

==== Concrete engineering ====
During its first 35 years, Kier became identified with certain civil engineering specialisms, such as contiguous cylindrical reinforced concrete grain silos and cement silos, using continuously sliding formwork; commencing with those at Barking in 1929, followed by grain silos at Northampton, Peterborough, Melksham, Gloucester and Witham; and cement silos at Norwich, Cambridge, Trinidad, and in India.

Such specialist work was part of a pattern that quickly developed in the company's operations during that period, namely the undertaking of innovative civil engineering techniques. Other elements within this pattern were hyperbolic natural draft cooling towers (mostly around 300 ft high), monolithic concrete chimneys (sometimes over 400 ft high), complete power station structures, and coastal works such as tanker berths, docks and harbours.

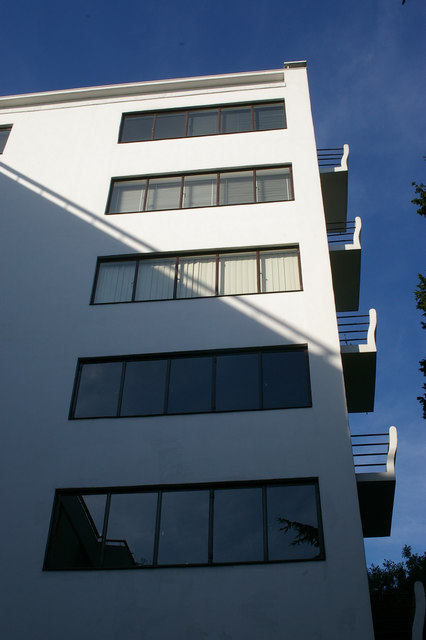
Corner detail of Highpoint I, showing balcony profiles.

In the same period, only this time in the building sector, Kier were in the vanguard of new reinforced concrete systems for use as framework for tall buildings. Their most famous contribution in this field was an eight-storey avant-garde development of apartment blocks named Highpoint, located in Highgate Village, north London. They were responsible for the reinforced concrete and general building.

When this project was completed in 1935 it became widely renowned as the finest example of this form of construction for residential purposes. When Le Corbusier himself visited Highpoint in 1935 he said, "This beautiful building .... at Highgate is an achievement of the first rank." And American critic Henry Russell Hitchcock called it, "One of the finest, if not absolutely the finest, middle-class housing projects in the world" (in 1970 both Highpoint blocks were classified Grade I listed buildings).

==== Kier dynasty ====
Olaf Kier sought to retain family leaders at the head of the organisation. However, his son by his first marriage was killed in a riding accident in 1945. Then, during the 1950s, Olaf's nephew, Mogens Kier, joined the firm's management structure, but did not progress to a leading position in the company. Olaf died in an accident in 1986, aged 87; and Mogens died in 2003.

=== Post-World War II ===
J.L. Kier & Co Ltd remained a private company until 1963, when it obtained a listing on the London Stock Exchange and became a public company. Its offer for shares was many times oversubscribed. The Kier family retained a significant majority of the holding. In 1973 Kier merged with W. & C. French to form French Kier but within the French division there were heavy losses on fixed-price motorway contracts and land development. A long-serving Kier engineer, John Mott, was appointed chief executive in order to revive the group's fortunes. Following an abortive bid for Abbey in 1985, French Kier itself was the subject of a hotly contested bid by Beazer, which eventually succeeded in January 1986.

Five years later (1991) Hanson plc bought Beazer plc and made an early decision to dispose of the contracting arm, now known simply as Kier. This was the subject of a management buyout in July 1992, with Hanson retaining a 10 per cent stake.

In 1993 Kier decided to re-enter the housing market with the £30m acquisition of Twigden Homes. This was followed by acquisitions of the southern division of Miller Homes in 1996, Bellwinch in 1998, and Allison Homes in 2001. By 2004, Kier housing sales were over 1,000 units a year. Kier was listed on the London Stock Exchange in 1996.

=== 21st century ===
In 2009, Mivan Kier, Kier's Romanian joint venture with the Northern Irish group Mivan, which invested in real estate projects in Bucharest, requested bankruptcy protection due to debts of €20 million.

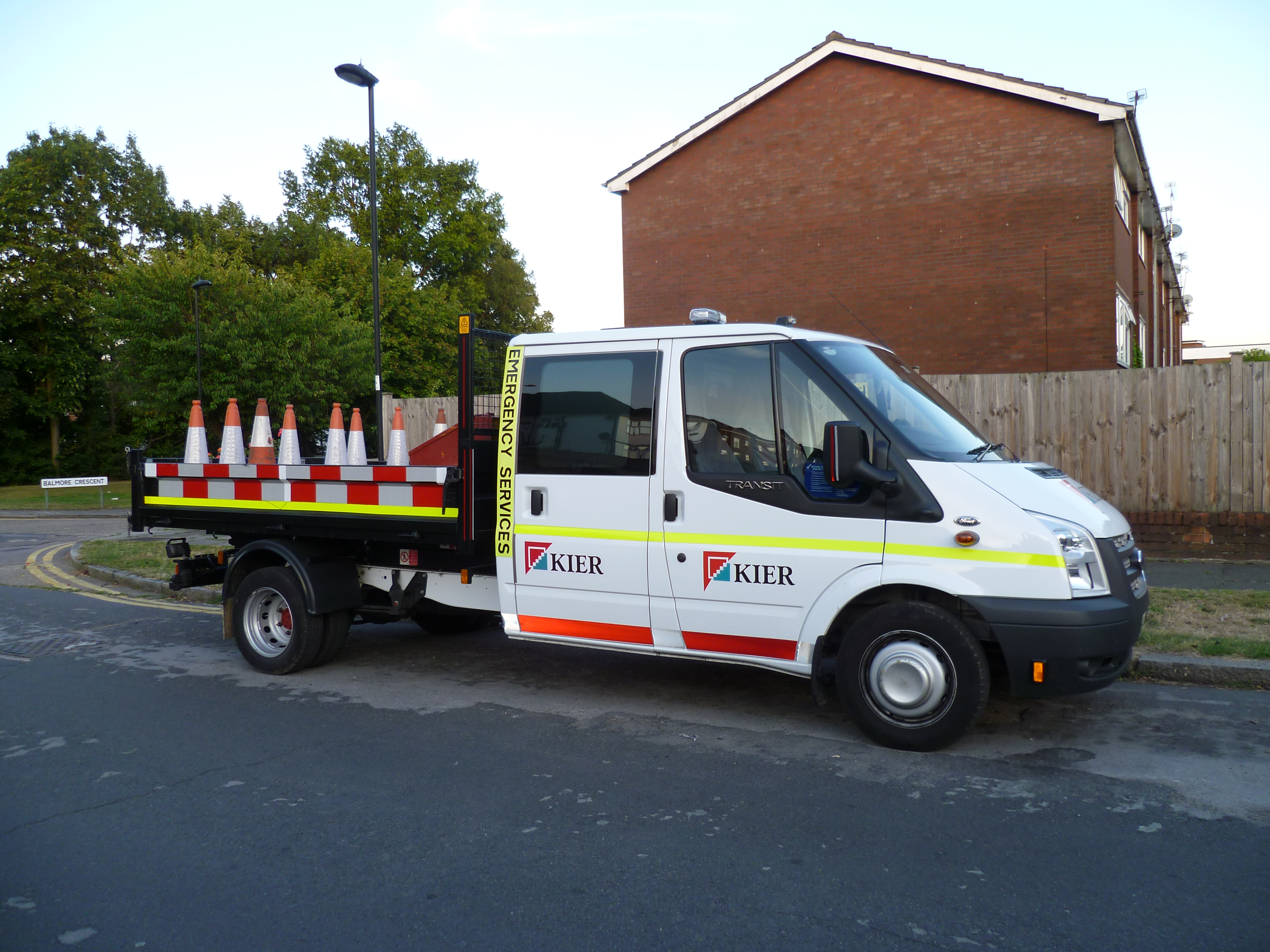
Kier branded vehicle

In 2013, Kier acquired the services firm May Gurney for £221 million, becoming the then fourth largest contracting firm in the UK (behind Balfour Beatty, Carillion and Laing O'Rourke). In June 2015 Kier completed the acquisition of Mouchel, a business which included infrastructure services and business services divisions, for £265 million; Mouchel Infrastructure Services was rebranded as Mouchel Consulting, and sold to WSP Global in October 2016. In July 2017 Kier acquired McNicholas Construction, another UK infrastructure services provider. Based on its turnover in the year ending June 2017, Kier was ranked in 2018 as the second biggest UK construction contractor, behind Balfour Beatty.

==== 2018–2021 financial difficulties ====
After the liquidation of rival Carillion in January 2018, Kier took on some Carillion staff and contracts: 150 Carillion workers employed on smart motorway joint ventures became Kier employees; 51 Carillion employees working on seven HS2 civil engineering packages awarded to the CEK joint venture were allowed to join Kier/Eiffage. However, because Kier shared characteristics that contributed to Carillion's collapse – problem contracts, rising debts, and use of reverse factoring supply chain finance – City hedge funds began to 'short' Kier's shares; 10.9% were shorted by 30 August 2018, later rising to 18%, though Kier's position was not seen to be as risky as Carillion's. The 2018 results were in line with City expectations – showing a pre-tax profit of £137m from stable revenue of £4.5 billion – with Kier outlining clear debt reduction plans. On 15 November 2018, Kier announced the £24m sale of its Australian road assets business KHSA to joint venture partner Downer, saying sale proceeds would help reduce net debt – £624m at 31 October 2018.

However, on 30 November, Kier announced a £264m rights issue, priced at 409p, to pay down net debts; Kier shares dropped almost 33%, cutting Kier's stock market value by £329m to £492m. The slide continued; on 5 December, Kier was demoted from the FTSE 250 Index, and its share price dropped below the rights issue price, making it cheaper for investors to buy shares in the open market than in the rights issue, and leaving underwriters (Numis, Peel Hunt, Citigroup, HSBC and Santander) facing losses. Shares were also subject to renewed 'shorting'. On 10 December, shares closed at 376.4p, a 15-year low. Only 38% of the rights issue was taken up, with shares still trading below the rights issue price, at 385p, on 19 December.

After the failed rights issue, shares fell by 13% to a 15-year low of 335p, but later recovered, trading at 529p on 11 January 2019, when some shareholders sought changes in Kier's leadership team. CEO Haydn Mursell subsequently resigned on 22 January (his successor, former Wates Group CEO Andrew Davies, took up the post on 15 April 2019). On 28 January 2019, Kier shares dropped 4% after reports it would sell its housing maintenance arm to cut debt, and the company was also reducing its waste management activities.

On 11 March 2019, Kier revised its average net debt for the six months to December 2018 by over £50m from £130m to £180.5m, raising average month-end net debt over the period from £370m to £430m. These revisions followed £10.3m in adjustments to the group's hedging activities, and £40.2m in relation to development assets held for resale. It also warned of £25m of additional costs on its Broadmoor Hospital redevelopment. Shares fell by 12% to 437p. (Kier's auditor PwC was later investigated by the Financial Reporting Council over a £40m accounting error, and in June 2022 was fined £1.96m for failing to adequately challenge revenue and costs recognised by Kier's management on large, complex long-term construction contracts.)

On 20 March 2019, Kier's half-year results showed a pre-tax loss of £35.5m in the second half of 2018 with revenues flat at £2,064m. As well as the Broadmoor provision, Kier lost £26m on a disputed waste collection contract, while integrating the McNicholas business and Kier restructuring added a further £15.4m to costs. Kier also highlighted "volume pressures" in its highways, utilities and housing maintenance markets. In a 3 June 2019 profit warning, Kier said operating profits would be £25m lower than previously expected, causing its share price to fall over 40% – trading at about 150p, less than half the rights issue price, on 6 June. Shares fell by over a third on 14 June, closing at 130.8p, after reports that Kier was looking to sell its housebuilding division.

On 17 June 2019, Kier confirmed the housing division sale, plans to wind down its property business, and a planned exit of the facilities management and environmental services markets. CEO Andrew Davies's business review included 1,200 job cuts. Kier's share price fell 17% to 108p, a level not seen since the company's 1996 flotation, and its shares were subject to renewed 'shorting' with one analyst saying "the consensus in the market is that Kier will go bust"; on 15 July 2019, Kier shares were the most 'shorted' on the London Stock Exchange, with shares falling 12.7% to 72.95p. Amid concerns about Kier's future, the company was dropped from two major development schemes, in Leeds and London.

In a trading update on 1 August 2019, Kier said average month-end net debt for the 2019 financial year was £422m, with revenues £100m lower, and, after significant interest in its housing division, said it had started the sale process (Guy Hands' Terra Firma Capital Partners was later reported to be among the bidders to acquire Kier Living). It also announced the appointment of a new CFO, Simon Kesterton (adept at "the disposal of non-core assets, the reduction of overheads and cost control").

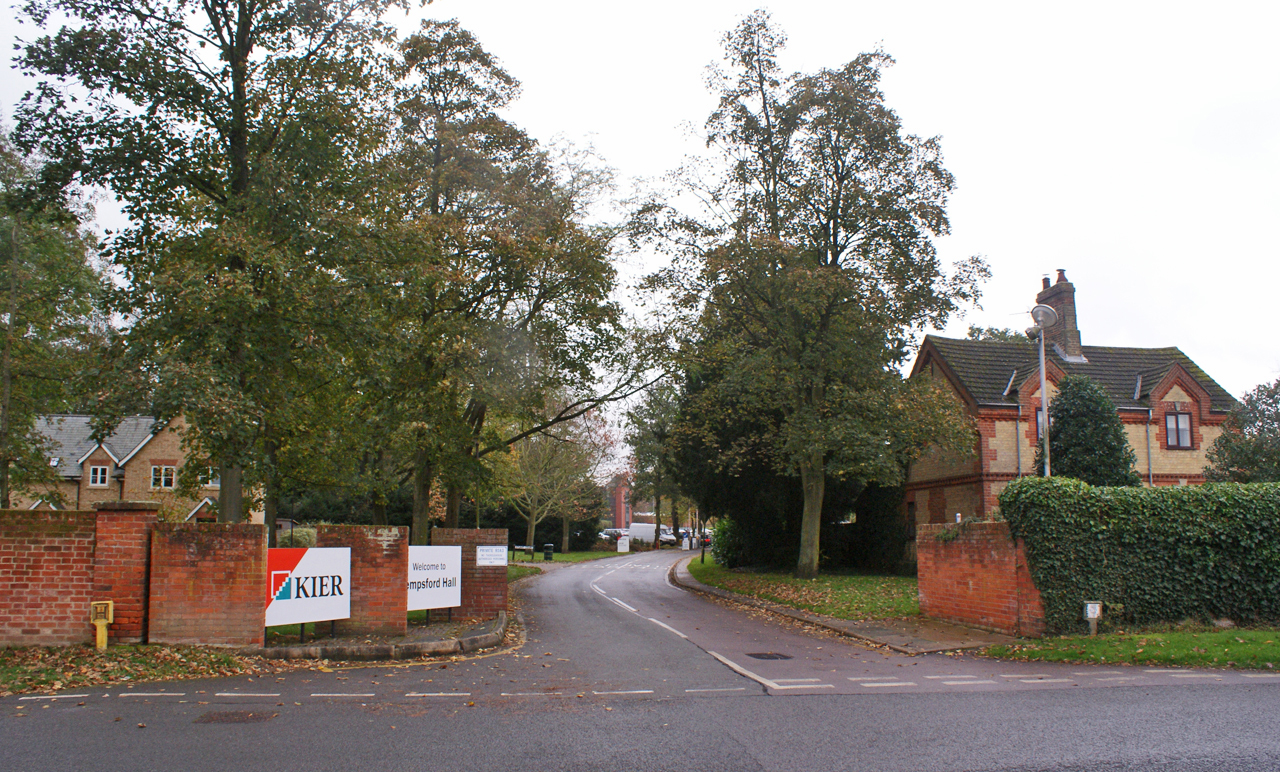
Entrance to Tempsford Hall

On 19 September 2019, Kier announced a £245m pre-tax loss on revenues of £4.5bn for the year to 30 June 2019, resulting from £341m in impairment costs and write-downs related to preparing businesses for sale, restructuring and loss-making contracts. The continuing restructuring had resulted in over 751 lay-offs, with a further 450 roles set to be axed. Group chairman Philip Cox stepped down, replaced by former Royal Mail FD Matthew Lester from 1 January 2020. In October 2019, Kier announced it was selling its Tempsford Hall headquarters in Bedfordshire to raise cash from its property assets. At the group's AGM in November 2019, shareholders objected to CEO Andrew Davies's £2.6m annual remuneration package and an associated long-term incentive scheme.

Half-year results announced on 5 March 2020 showed Kier made a pre-tax loss of £41.2m in the final six months of 2019 (marginally better than 2018's restated £45.3m loss); revenues were down 9% to £1,866m (2018: £2,053m). The cost-cutting process begun in 2018 had cut 1,200 jobs with another 50 set to leave by 30 June 2020. The sale of Kier Living was in progress, as was the process of closing Kier's head office, set to complete in June 2020. On 24 March 2020, as the financial impacts of the COVID-19 pandemic became clear, Kier's board of directors took a three-month 20% pay cut, then, on 30 March, announced all 6,500 Kier employees would have their base salary reduced by between 7.5% and 25% for three months; it stepped up its cost reduction programme, bringing forward the closure of Tempsford Hall to 30 April (head office functions were transferred to Manchester in mid April), and paused the sale of its housebuilding business, Kier Living (though Terra Firma revived talks about buying Kier Living in December 2020). Kier also closed its Reading office with the loss of up to 40 jobs.

On 1 July 2020, Kier announced it was considering a further rights issue to raise cash as average net debt had risen due to COVID-19 impacts; average month-end net debt was up from £395m in December 2019 to £440m, and could rise to £485m. Further job cuts were also likely.

On 17 September 2020, Kier announced a £225.5m loss on the year to 30 June 2020, on revenues down 15% to £3,476m, with the fall partly due to COVID-19 impacts. Group headcount had been reduced by 1,700. Following this announcement, Kier shares sagged to 51.40p. In a January 2021 trading update, Kier said average monthly net debt remained around £436m; progress with the sale of Kier Living continued, with Kier hoping to receive around £100m for the business to help reduce debt; and Kier was aiming to make at least £105m in cost savings by the end of the financial year. Kier Living's sale came ahead of the company's (delayed) half-year results in April 2021.

On 6 April 2021, Sky News reported that Kier Living would be sold to Terra Firma, for £110m, subject to agreement at a meeting of Kier shareholders in early May, with completion of the sale by mid-June 2021. Kier Living was bought by a new company owned by Terra Firma founder Guy Hands, and was rebranded as Tilia Homes. However, the sale would not significantly improve Kier's debt position, and analysts predicted an equity raise; on 21 April 2021, CEO Davies confirmed a planned equity raise to address its net debt position, unchanged at £436m. On 13 May 2021, Kier launched a £241m fund raise, with shares offered at 85p (a 17% discount to their then trading price).

==== 2022–2026: Return to profitability ====
Following a successful £241m capital raise and Kier Living's sale, in September 2021, Kier announced it had scraped back into profitability, reporting a pre-tax profit of £5.6m in the year to 30 June 2021 on turnover of £3,329m. In a January 2022 trading update, Kier said it had more than halved its net debt from around £436m to below £200m, and was on track to meet a medium term revenue target of £4–£4.5bn.

Also in January 2022, Kier was reported to be in advanced talks to acquire rival contractor Tilbury Douglas, the remaining contracting arm of the former Interserve group, with speculation it might pay around £50m for the almost-£500m turnover business. However, Kier discontinued negotiations in March 2022.

In the November 2022 company AGM, 44% of Kier shareholders voted against the directors' pay report after CEO Andrew Davies’ pay package jumped by around 70%. His total pay rose to £2.245m for 2022 from £1.323m in 2021.

In September 2023, it was announced Kier had acquired the rail division of the UK construction company, Buckingham Group – which went into administration in August 2023. Buckingham's rail assets and its HS2 contract were purchased for £9.6 million.

In a January 2024 trading update, Kier said it had cut average month-end net debt by around £100m to £140m, the lowest level in over five years. In March 2024, Kier shares were set to return to the FTSE 250 Index, and the company resumed dividend payments for the first time in five years. In September 2024, Kier reported group revenue for the year to 30 June 2024 was up 16% to £3,905m (from £3,381m in 2023), with a pre-tax profit of £68.1m (£51.9m in 2023). Average month-end net debt was halved (from £232m) to £116m. Continuing debt improvements led the company to announce a £20 million share buy-back scheme in January 2025.

In July 2025, Kier announced CEO Andrew Davies would retire in October 2025, when he was replaced by Stuart Togwell, leaving the business with record orders, rising profits and revenue above £4bn for the first time since 2018. In the year to 30 June 2025, pre-tax profit was up 15% at £78.1m (2024: £68.1m) on total revenue up 4% at £4,077m (2024: £3,905m), operating profit increased 10% to £113.7m (2024: £103.1m) and average month-end net debt was £49m, down from £116m. In a January 2026 trading update, Kier said it had achieved a positive month-end net cash position for the first time in over a decade (around £15m for six months to 31 December 2025).

In the year to 30 June 2026, group turnover increased to £4,393m and pre-tax profits rose to £83.8m led by Kier's construction and infrastructure operations. Kier announced it was withdrawing from property investment to focus on infrastructure and construction operations. The property business generated revenue of £63m in the year to June 2026.

== Operations ==
From August 2021, the UK company has had four regional divisions (London, South & Strategic Projects; Midlands & Eastern; Western & Wales; North & Scotland), plus Kier Places (housing maintenance and facilities management).

== Major projects ==
Projects involving the company have included Highpoint I completed in 1935, the M2 Medway Bridge, Kent completed in 1963, the North Terminal at Gatwick Airport completed in 1988, the Lesotho Highlands Water Project completed in 1998, Hairmyres Hospital completed in 2001, High Speed 1 completed in 2007, the Castlepoint shopping centre in Bournemouth in 2003, the UK Supreme Court in London completed in 2009 and Snowhill Phase 2 in Birmingham completed in 2009.

Kier Group is also involved in HS2 lots C2 and C3, working as part of a joint venture with Eiffage, due to complete in 2031.

Kier Group have also started construction on a new prison in Glasgow which is to replace HMP Barlinnie; the project is expected to be complete by 2028.

== Controversies ==
Kier was revealed as a subscriber to the UK's Consulting Association, exposed in 2009 for operating an illegal construction industry blacklist, and was among 14 issued with enforcement notices by the UK Information Commissioner's Office. Subsequently, Kier was among eight businesses involved in the 2014 launch of the Construction Workers Compensation Scheme, condemned as a "PR stunt" by the GMB union, and described by the Scottish Affairs Select Committee as "an act of bad faith". In December 2017, Unite announced it had issued high court proceedings against four former chairmen of the Consulting Association, included Danny O'Sullivan of Kier, alleging breach of privacy, defamation and Data Protection Act offences. Unite also said it was taking action against 12 major contractors including Kier.

Following a devastating fire in the Glasgow School of Art's Mackintosh Building on 15 June 2018, the school terminated its £25 million restoration contract with Kier on 29 June 2018.

Kier was the main contractor in the failed DG One leisure centre in Dumfries.

In October 2018, Kier was named as a 'poor payer' at a Parliamentary inquiry into small businesses, failing to pay 48% of invoices due within their agreed terms, leading some suppliers to refuse to work for the company. In November 2019, Kier and subsidiary McNicholas Construction Services were suspended from the Prompt Payment Code for "failing to honour a commitment to pay 95% of all supplier invoices within 60 days". Kier Construction was reinstated in December 2019; Kier Highways and Kier Infrastructure & Overseas were reinstated in June 2020; Kier Integrated Services was reinstated in August 2020, but McNicholas Construction Services remained suspended until December 2020.

In May 2022, Kier was criticised by councillors for quoting "unaffordable" prices for simple highway maintenance roadworks in Suffolk.

Kier workers operating machinery on a project on the M6 motorway near Sandbach, Cheshire twice brought down overhead powerlines, in incidents in March 2018 and January 2019. In January 2023, the company was fined £4.4m after pleading guilty to safety breaches at Manchester Crown Court.

In June 2023, Kier subsidiary McNicholas Construction was named for failing to pay staff the UK legal minimum wage. It was among the 10 worst offenders, failing to pay £170,517.57 to 704 workers.
