= Andrew Davies (businessman) =

British businessman (born 1963)

- Born: October 1963 (age 62)
- Education: University of Sheffield
- Occupation: Business executive
- Known for: Chief Executive of Kier Group; Former CEO of Wates Group; Turnaround of Kier Group
- Office: Chief Executive of Kier Group
- Predecessor: Haydn Mursell

Andrew Oswell Bede Davies (born October 1963) is a British businessman, and former CEO of Kier Group.

== Early career ==
Educated at the University of Sheffield, Davies joined BAE Systems in 1985. At the company he became Managing Director Land Systems in 2004, Group Strategy Director in 2008 and Managing Director Maritime in 2011.

He went on to be CEO of Wates Group, in 2014, and was appointed CEO designate of Carillion, in October 2017. Originally scheduled to join the financially troubled business, in April 2018, Carillion announced in December 2017, that it had brought forward his start date to 22 January 2018. However, Carillion went into liquidation one week before he was due to take up his post.

During 2018, Davies continued as a non-executive director of aerospace and defence contractor Chemring, and also walked several long-distance paths including the 186-mile Pembrokeshire Coast Path.

== Kier Group ==
In January 2019, after turning down job offers elsewhere, Davies was linked with the vacant CEO post at the similarly financially troubled Kier Group, officially confirmed on 19 March 2019, with Davies taking up the post on 15 April 2019, when he announced a strategic review of the group's structure. He later said Kier "was fundamentally a very strong operational company but had lost their way strategically and had taken a number of missteps which had proved, frankly, catastrophic."

Less than two months later, on 3 June 2019, Kier issued a profit warning, causing its share price to fall over 40%, and the fall continued, on 14 June, after reports that Kier would sell its housebuilding division. On 17 June, Davies confirmed the housing division sale, plans to exit other markets, and 1,200 job cuts. Kier's share price fell 17% to 108p, a level not seen since the company's 1996 flotation, and its shares were subject to renewed 'shorting' with one analyst saying "every time Andrew Davies opens his mouth [Kier’s] shares seem to dive by 18% and the consensus in the market is that Kier will go bust."

At the group's AGM in November 2019, shareholders objected to Davies's £2.6m annual remuneration package and an associated long-term incentive scheme.

In July 2025, Kier announced Davies would retire in October 2025 and be replaced by Stuart Togwell, leaving the business with record orders, rising profits and revenue above £4bn for the first time since 2018.
