= Annington Homes =

British real estate company

Annington Limited
- Type: Subsidiary
- Industry: Real estate
- Founded: 29 July 1996; 29 years ago
- Headquarters: London, UK
- Key people: Ian Rylatt (Chief executive officer); Stephen Leung (Chief financial officer)
- Parent: Terra Firma Capital Partners
- Website: www.annington.co.uk

Annington Homes is a provider of privately rented homes in the United Kingdom, specialising in converting former Ministry of Defence (MoD) housing for the general public since 1996. Since 2012, the company has been a wholly owned subsidiary of Terra Firma Capital Partners.

== History ==
In 1996, the MoD sold all its housing for military personnel and their families, 57,400 properties, to Annington Homes for £1.67bn as part of a broader process of privatisation of state assets, making Annington the largest owner of residential property in England and Wales. Annington Homes had been established earlier that year as a shell company by Nomura Holdings; Nomura's Guy Hands played a central role in the deal. The MoD lacked funds to maintain the properties, and intended to rent the homes from Annington at a discounted rate, while allowing the company to sell homes the armed forces no longer required.

In 2012 Nomura sold Annington Homes to Terra Firma for £3.2bn. The rent per house paid by the MoD nearly doubled between 1997 and 2016, and in 2016 the MoD paid dilapidations of £21,809 on average when returning homes to Annington. As of 2017, around 20,000 of the 57,400 homes had been sold on. Kevan Jones, who was Parliamentary Under-Secretary of State for Veterans under Gordon Brown, described the MoD's deal with Annington as "an incredibly bad deal for the taxpayer." Alan West, Baron West of Spithead, the former First Sea Lord, said the armed forces had failed to understand the long-term consequences of the deal at the time it was made.

In 2022, the MoD announced plans to use the Leasehold Reform Act 1967 to reverse the privatisation deal and return the properties to public ownership. Terra Firma said it would challenge the decision in court.

In December 2024, Annington agreed to sell 36,347 homes (the Married Quarters Estate) back to the MoD for £5.99 billion, ending the legal dispute. The deal ended a "huge annual rental bill", saving around £230m a year.
