= Simone Rossi =

Italian businessman

- Born: October 1968 (age 57–58)
- Education: Bocconi University; Istituto Puccini
- Occupation: businessman
- Title: CEO, EDF Energy
- Term: November 2017-
- Predecessor: Vincent de Rivaz
- Spouse: married
- Children: 2 daughters

Simone Rossi (born October 1968) is an Italian businessman and the CEO of EDF Energy, having succeeded Vincent de Rivaz in November 2017.

Simone Rossi was born in October 1968. He has a degree in business administration from Bocconi University, Milan, and a degree in clarinet from Istituto Puccini, Gallarate.

Rossi has worked for EDF since 2004. Prior to his appointment as CEO, Rossi was head of EDF Group's international division since 2015, and previously EDF Energy's chief financial officer.

Rossi is married, with two daughters.

Business positions
Preceded by Vincent de Rivaz	Chief Executive of EDF Energy; 2017–present	Incumbent
