= Olaf Kier =

Olaf Hector Kier (born Kiaer), CBE (c.1899 - 1986) was the founder of Kier Group, one of the United Kingdom's largest construction businesses.

== Career ==
Born and educated in Denmark as Olaf Kiaer, Olaf graduated with a honours degree in Engineering from the University of Copenhagen. After a short period in the Danish Navy, following his father Hector Frederik Kiaer (Admiral and Captain of the King's ship Dannebrog)'s foot steps, he then moved to London to learn English and to pursue his career. He initially worked for Christiani & Nielsen where he worked on various projects involving concrete.

Together with Jorgen Lotz, he founded Lotz & Kier, a construction business, in 1928. The business name was changed to J.L. Kier & Co Ltd a few years later, after Lotz withdrew from the company in the early 1930s.

In 1941 he acquired the Lexham Hall Estate near Litcham in Norfolk but, in 1945, when he saw the condition that the Army had left it in, decided to put it back on the market. He instead acquired the Cokenach Estate near Barkway in Hertfordshire. In 1965 he established the Olaf Kier Danish Charity.

After the Second World War, a contract was awarded to J.L. Kier & Co, Nuttall and some Dutch contractors to rebuild the devastated Rotterdam docks.

Further major infrastructure projects included the M2 Medway Bridge and many power stations.

He was a member of the Danish Club at 62 Knightsbridge and was awarded made CBE for industrial and social services in 1970. He died in a motor accident in May 1986 aged 87.
