= Allington, Kent =

Village in Kent, England

Coordinates: 51.2903°N 0.5019°E

Allington
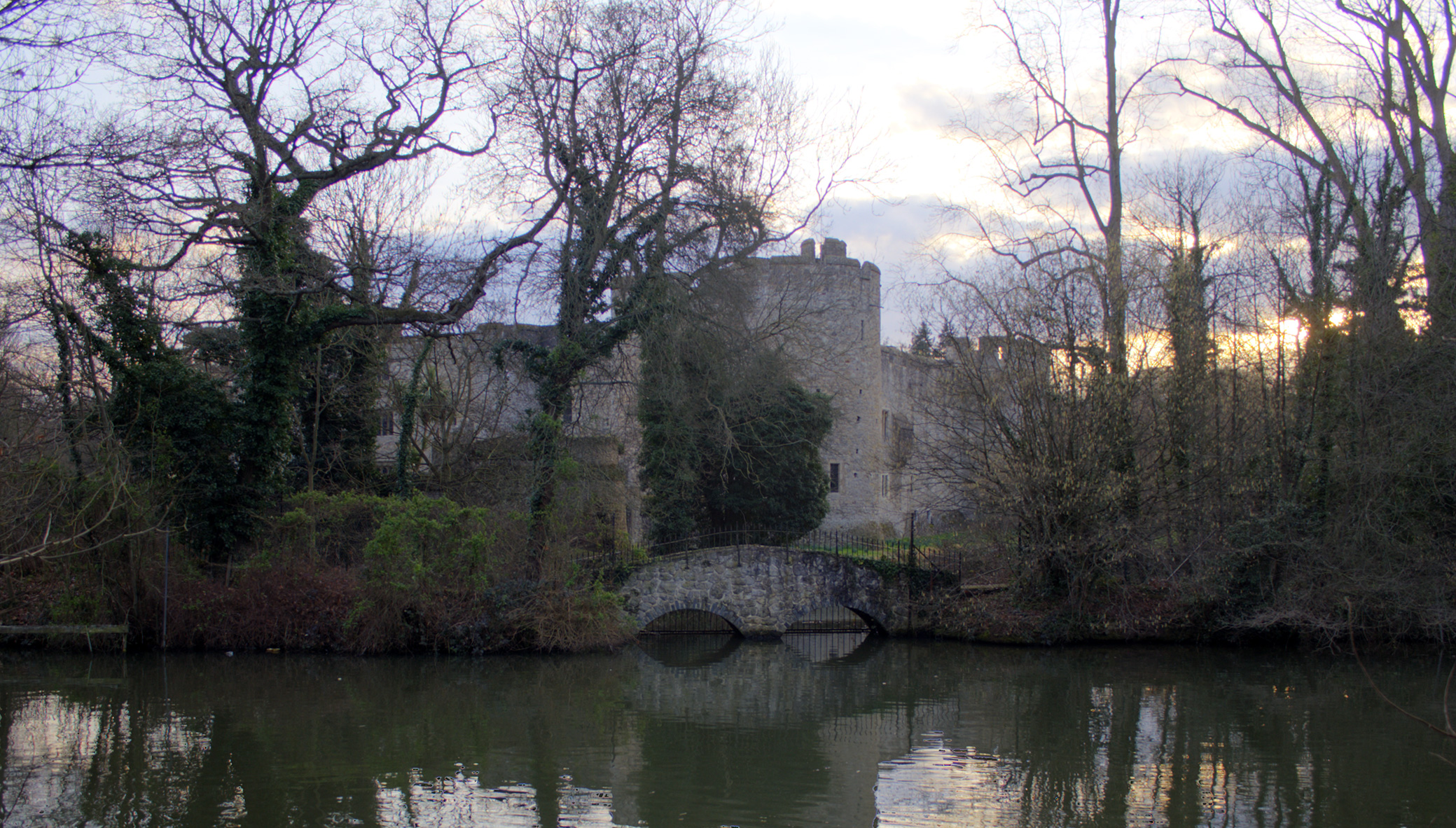
- Allington Castle from the opposite bank of the Medway

- Location within Kent
- Population: 7,100 (2005); 6,878 (2011)
- OS grid reference: TQ745575
- District: Maidstone
- Shire county: Kent
- Region: South East
- Country: England
- Sovereign state: United Kingdom
- Post town: MAIDSTONE
- Postcode district: ME16
- Dialling code: 01622
- Police: Kent
- Fire: Kent
- Ambulance: South East Coast
- UK Parliament: Maidstone and Malling

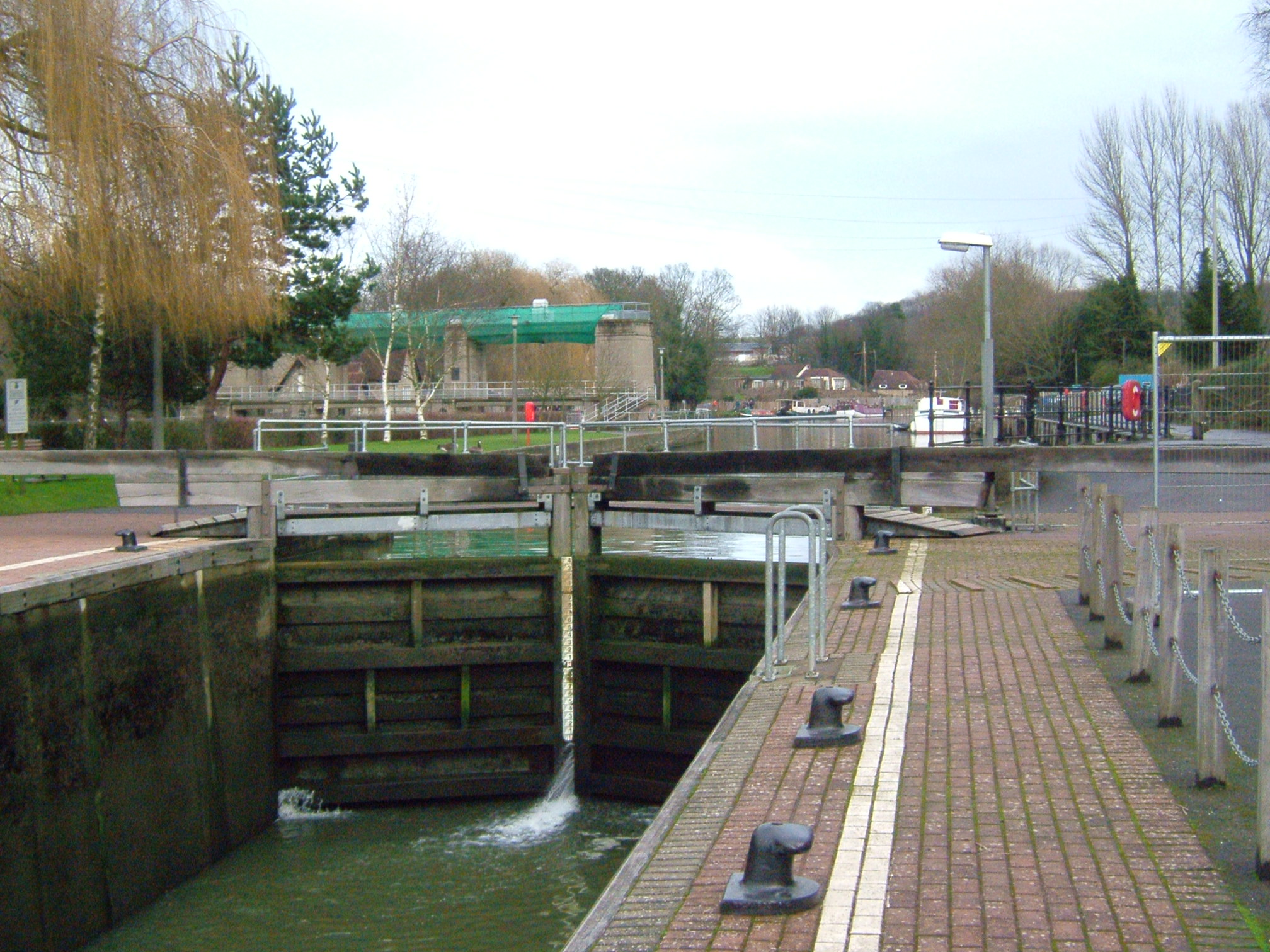
Allington Lock on the Medway, looking upriver

Allington is an almost entirely modern village situated alongside the sides of the A20 road north-west of Maidstone in Kent, England. It is part of the built-up area of Maidstone.

Arthur Mee praised it in the 20th century, using the analogy that "if Kent is the garden of England, Allington is like an English rose set in the midst of it."

== History ==
The name Allington, which is shared by a hamlet near Lenham, is derived from the Old English tun farmstead; it comes via eleventh-century Elentun and was connected with a man called Ælla. It has been suggested that Celtic Britons had built a moated village on the site.

Allington Castle was originally built in the 11th century. In 1281 the present stone castle was built, which was converted to a mansion in the 15th century. In 1492 the castle came into the possession of the Wyatt family. By the mid-19th century it was derelict, but was restored in 1905; in 1951 it was taken over by the Carmelite order. Today it is owned by Sir Robert Worcester as a private residence and is not open to the public.

The few dwellings around the castle had a population of 49 in 1841. There was a church dedicated to St Laurence which closed in 1969. In the modern village is a modern parish church dedicated to St Nicholas, the second to be built on the site. Furnishings from St Laurence's are used here.

In 1931 the civil parish had a population of 114. On 1 April 1932 the parish was abolished and merged with Maidstone and Boxley. It is now in the unparished area of Maidstone.

== Amenities ==
It has two primary schools, Allington Primary and Palace Wood. The Mid Kent Shopping Centre opened in 1969 and includes a Waitrose supermarket and smaller shops. Multiple secondary schools are also located within walking distance - Maidstone Grammar School for Girls, Oakwood Park Grammar School, The Maplesden Noakes School, St Augustine’s and St Simon’s Stock, as well as one of the Midkent College campuses.

Down the hill from St Laurence's Church is the River Medway, Allington Lock and Allington Sluice. There is a footpath over the lock. Below the lock, the Medway becomes tidal. On the other bank is the Malta Inn and Kent Life museum. A footpath runs from here to Teston. A Park and Sail service (claimed to be the only one in England) operates on the weekends leading up to Christmas. Using the car park and boarding by the Malta Inn, the MV Kentish Lady carries shoppers to Maidstone and back.

The nearby 20/20 industrial park, named after the adjacent M20/A20 junction, includes Allington Quarry Waste Management Facility.

At Poplar Park residents have use of football pitches, tennis courts and a children's play area.

== Sports ==
Castle Colts along with the affiliate club Castle Wanderers are the local football teams. Both play their home games at the ACA. Jon Harley played for Castle Colts in his youth before being scouted by Chelsea.

== See also ==
- Allington Quarry Waste Management Facility
