= Untypical =

British house-building company

- Industry: house-building
- Predecessor: Kier Living, then Tilia Homes
- Founded: 1 June 2021
- Headquarters: Solihull, England
- Key people: Chris Severson (Chairman); Philip Chapman (Chief Operating Officer)
- Number of employees: 380 (2024)
- Parent: Terra Firma Capital Partners
- Website: www.tiliahomes.co.uk

Untypical (originally Kier Living, part of the Kier Group, and later Tilia Homes) is a British housebuilding company owned by private equity firm Terra Firma Capital Partners.

== History ==
Following a failed rights issue during late 2018, financially troubled Kier Group began an extensive restructuring, debt reduction, cost-cutting and disposals programme in 2019; after the firm received significant interest in its housing division Kier Living, it opted to start the sale process. Terra Firma Capital Partners was one of several parties that opted to place a bid. The sale of Kier Living was slowed by the COVID-19 pandemic but by early 2021 progress picked up. Kier publicly stated that it aimed to receive around £100 million for the business.

On 6 April 2021, Sky News confirmed that Kier Living would be acquired by Terra Firma for £110 million, subject to agreement at a meeting of Kier shareholders in early May, with completion expected by mid-June 2021. Kier Living was bought by a new company owned by Hands, and was rebranded as Tilia Homes in May 2021. The business completed over 1,100 private and affordable homes in the year to June 2020. It built 1,450 homes across its central, eastern, northern and western regions in the year to June 2021.

In July 2021, Terra Firma submitted a £700 million bid to purchase Keepmoat Homes, which it envisioned combining with Tilia Homes. However, Keepmoat was acquired by rival company Aermont Capital instead. Months later, Terra Firma planned to acquire another house builder, Hopkins Homes, which it had tentatively valued at around £300 million. The acquisition was completed in January 2022.

During late 2021 and early 2022, various changes amongst Tilia Homes' senior management were made, including the appointment of Andrew Hammond as divisional managing director and the departure of chief operating officer Mike Coker after less than a year with the firm.

In October 2024, Terra Firma announced it was merging Tilia Homes with its Hopkins Homes subsidiary, the largest privately owned housebuilder in East Anglia. The merged business was to be named 'Untypical', but the name change was not recorded at Companies House over a year later, when Hands appointed former Barratt executive Gary Ennis as the Solihull-based business's chief executive.
