= Greengairs Landfill =

Landfill site in North Lanarkshire, Scotland

Coordinates: 55.906°N 3.934°W

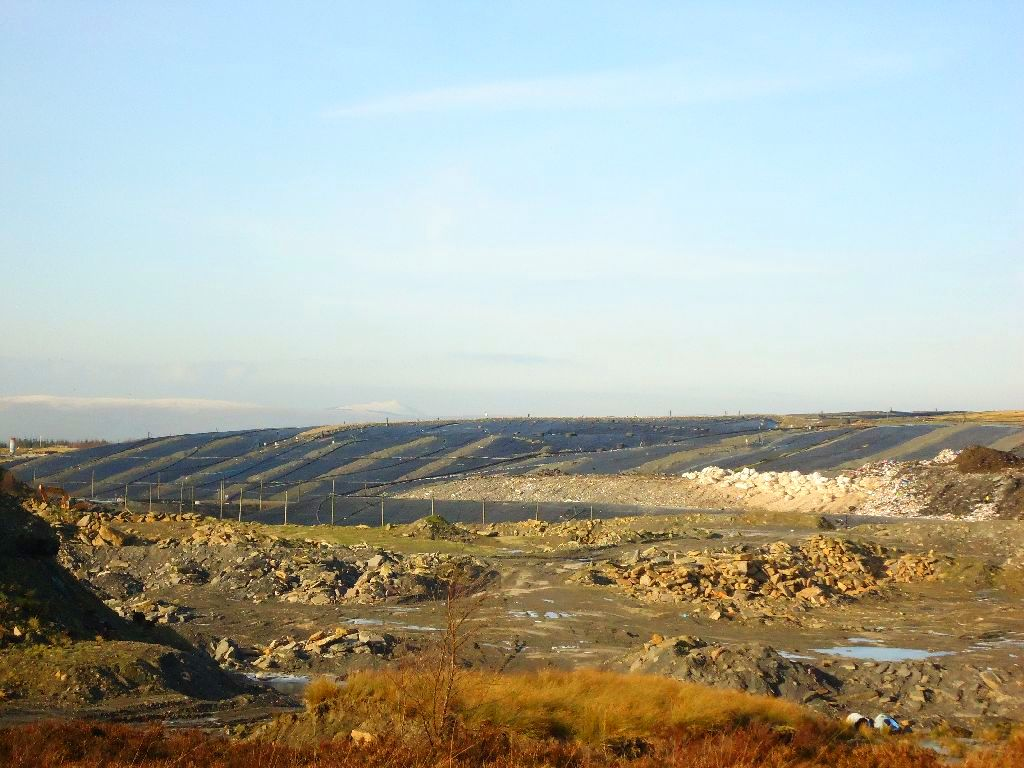
Greengairs Landfill in 2012

The Greengairs Landfill is a landfill site in Scotland that receives non-hazardous household, commercial and industrial waste from the North Lanarkshire area. Greengairs was opened in 1990 and features landfill gas collection systems which are used to generate electricity for export into the National Grid.

The landfill is owned and operated by FCC Environment.

In June 2024 a fire broke out at the landfill. Scottish Fire and Rescue Service dealt with the fire and urged citizens in the East of Scotland to keep windows and doors shut.

== See also ==
- Avondale Landfill
