= Allington Quarry =

Site of Special Scientific Interest in Kent, England

Coordinates: 51.29°N 0.498°E

- Site of Special Scientific Interest
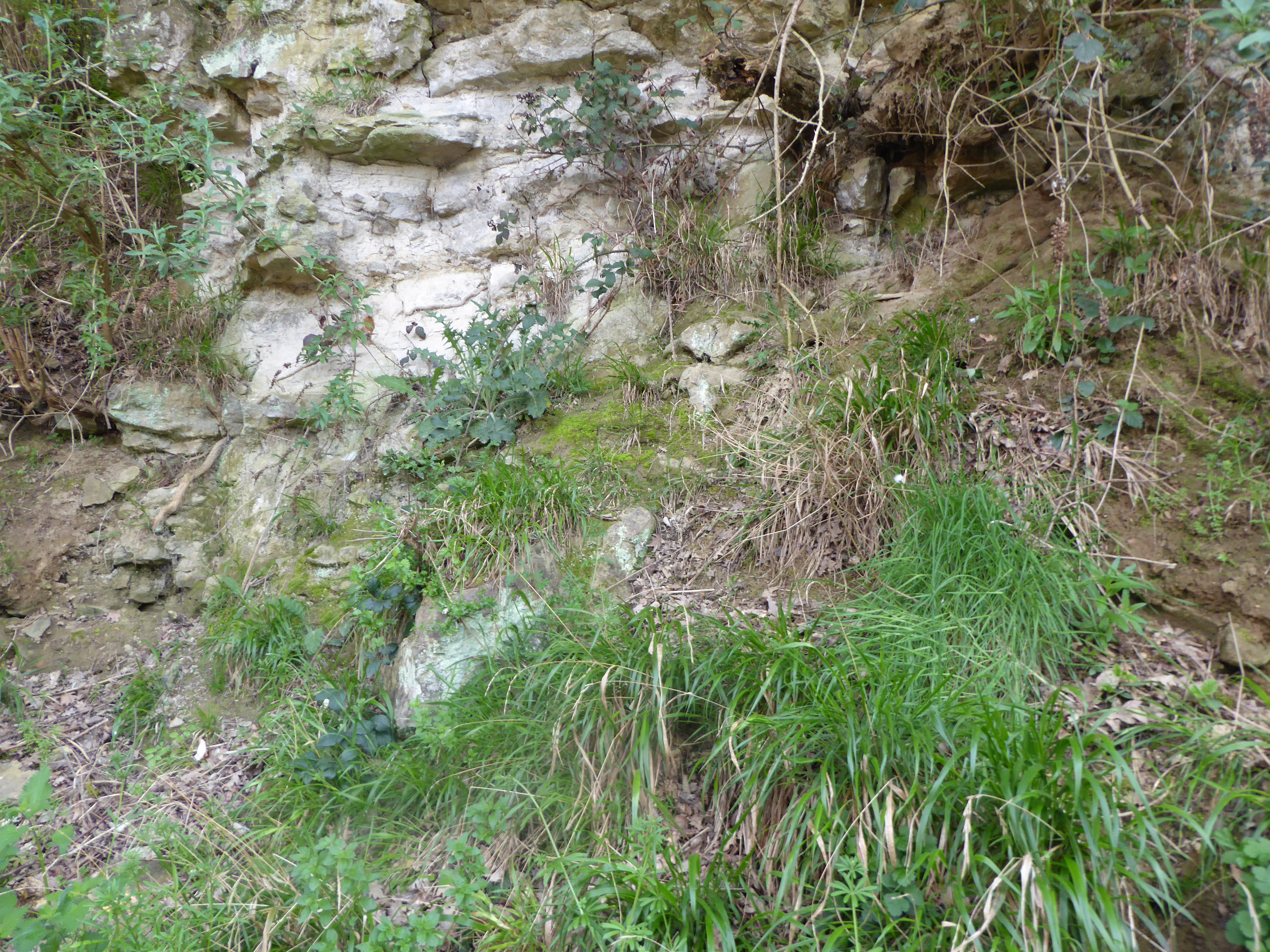
- Location of Allington Quarry.
- Area of search: Kent
- Grid reference: TQ 743 575
- Interest: Geological
- Area: 0.8 hectares (2.0 acres)
- Notification date: 1993
- Location map: Magic Map

Allington Quarry is a 0.8-hectare (2.0-acre) geological Site of Special Scientific Interest north of Maidstone in Kent. It is a Geological Conservation Review site.

This Pleistocene site has an extensive section through gulls (cracks in the rock) which are filled with loess. These were probably produced by seasonal freezing and thawing during the last ice age.

The site is private land with no public access.

== Land ownership ==
All land within Allington Quarry SSSI is owned by the local authority
