= AWAS (company) =

Commercial jet aircraft leasing company

- Formerly: Ansett Worldwide; Ansett Worldwide Aviation Services
- Type: Subsidiary
- Industry: Aviation
- Founded: 1985
- Founder: News Corporation; TNT
- Defunct: 2017
- Fate: Acquired by DAE Capital
- Headquarters: Dublin, Ireland
- Key people: Werner Seifert (Chairman); David Siegel (Chief Executive Officer)
- Services: Aircraft leasing
- Revenue: $1.1 billion (2013)
- Operating income: $380 million (2013)
- Net income: $72 million (2013)
- Number of employees: 135 (2013)
- Parent: Terra Firma Capital Partners
- Website: www.awas.com

AWAS, formerly Ansett Worldwide Aviation Services, was one of the world's largest aircraft leasing companies. Its head office was in Dublin, Ireland, with offices in Miami, New York and Singapore.

Founded in 1985 by News Corporation and TNT, in August 2017 it was acquired by DAE Capital and the brand retired.

== History ==
Ansett Worldwide Aviation Services was established by News Corporation and TNT, co-owners of Ansett Transport Industries, in 1985. It was a separate company from Ansett Transport Industries and not included in the sale of Ansett to Air New Zealand in 1996.

Ansett Worldwide was sold to Morgan Stanley Dean Witter in February 2000 for US$600 million. At the time of sale, AWAS had a leasing portfolio of 105 aircraft valued at US$4 billion, with 47 airlines. The Ansett name was retained as it was instantly recognisable in the global aviation industry. Under Morgan Stanley ownership the company was renamed simply Ansett Worldwide, the Aviation Services being omitted. The Ansett Worldwide fleet was combined with the Morgan Stanley Aircraft Leasing fleet, resulting in a combined fleet size of 180 aircraft by 2003.

In 2004 Ansett Worldwide was rebranded as AWAS. A company media release issued to coincide with the rebranding stated that the company had outlived its association with a failed airline, hence the dropping of the Ansett name. In the industry it was known that some customers had shown a reluctance to deal with Ansett Worldwide, perceiving that the aircraft available were ex-Ansett Airlines aircraft that had been sitting idle since the airline had ceased operations, despite assurances from the lessor that this was not true.

In 2006, Morgan Stanley sold AWAS to Terra Firma Capital Partners with management and operations relocated to Dublin. In 2007, AWAS acquired Pegasus Aviation Finance Company.

In August 2017, AWAS was acquired by DAE Capital and the brand retired.

== Corporate affairs ==
AWAS had its head office in The Galleries Building, 500 George Street, Sydney, Australia during the period of Morgan Stanley ownership. Administratively, the CEO and selected staff relocated to the Seattle office to be closer to Morgan Stanley's New York headquarters. The company's marketing, I.T., communications, legal, financial and administrative sections remained in Sydney throughout this period. Post the acquisition by Terra Firma the Sydney office closed, staff were either retrenched or relocated to the new Ireland office in Block B of Riverside IV along Sir John Rogerson's Quay in Dublin, Ireland. Its Miami office was in One Brickell Square in Downtown Miami, while its New York office was at 444 Madison Avenue.

Previously, its Dublin location was in the City West Business Campus. It also had a London office in the City of Westminster. By 2007 the company opened its new Dublin headquarters, Alexandra House, The Sweepstakes, Ballsbridge. At that time it consolidated its London office into its Dublin headquarters.

The company previously had an office in Bellevue, Washington. In 2006, the office had 30 employees in the office. By 2007, it merged into the Miami office.
