= Allington Quarry Waste Management Facility =

Waste management centre in Allington, Kent

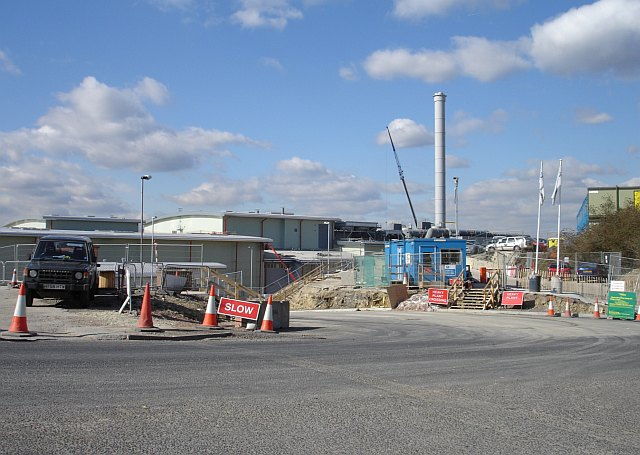
- Allington Quarry Waste Management Facility in March 2006
- Official name: Allington Quarry Waste; Management Facility
- Country: England
- Location: Aylesford; Kent
- Coordinates: 51.2928°N 0.4912°E
- Status: Operational
- Commission date: 2007
- Operator: Kent Enviropower

Thermal power station
- Primary fuel: Waste

Power generation
- Nameplate capacity: 40 MW

External links
- Commons: Related media on Commons

The Allington Quarry Waste Management Facility is an integrated waste management centre in Allington, Kent. It is the site of the Allington Energy from Waste (EfW) Incinerator. The incinerator is owned by FCC Environment as Kent Enviropower. The facility, which has involved an investment of over £150 million, is able to process 500,000 tonnes per annum of waste and has the ability to produce 40 MW of power. The facility takes non-hazardous waste from households and businesses in Kent and the surrounding area for recycling and energy recovery. Materials separated by householders are sorted and sent for recycling, with the remainder being used to generate electricity to power the facility and for the local supply network.

Built in a former ragstone quarry, the site includes one 80-metre-high (260 ft) chimney, and covers an area of 84 acres (34 ha), of which 67 acres (27 ha) will eventually become parkland, and permanently employs around 100 people.

Under a 25-year contract with Kent County Council, Over 325,000 tonnes of municipal waste, from Maidstone, Sevenoaks, Tunbridge Wells, Tonbridge and Malling, Dartford, Gravesham and Swale councils will be processed each year. The centre is a major waste facility and will contribute to Kent meeting its LATS obligations for the diversion of waste from landfill. The incinerator employs fluidized bed incineration technology and has been in commercial operation since December 2008.

== See also ==
- List of incinerators in the UK
- Waste-to-energy
