= Vincent de Rivaz =

French businessman (born 1953)

- Born: 4 October 1953 (age 72); Paris, France
- Education: École Nationale Supérieure d'Hydraulique et de Mécanique de Grenoble
- Occupation: CEO of EDF Energy (2003–2017)

Vincent de Rivaz (born 4 October 1953, in Paris) is a French businessman who is the former chief executive (CEO) of EDF Energy plc, a British subsidiary of Électricité de France.

== Early life ==
He studied engineering at the École Nationale Supérieure d'Hydraulique et de Mécanique de Grenoble, part of the Grenoble Institute of Technology in the Rhône-Alpes region.

== Career ==
=== Électricité de France ===
He joined Électricité de France in 1977 as a hydraulic engineer. From 1991-94 he was the managing director of the hydropower department.

He became head of the UK operations in 2002.

=== EDF Energy ===
He was CEO of EDF Energy between 2003 and 2017.

He met Bill Coley, the former chief executive of British Energy, in 2005 to discuss a take-over of British Energy.

In November 2017 he stepped down as CEO and was replaced with Simone Rossi.

== Personal life ==
He married Anne de Valence de Minardière in 1980. They have three sons. He was awarded Knight of the Legion of Honour, the Melchett Medal in 2006, and an honorary Commander of the British Empire (CBE) in 2012.

Business positions
Preceded by New company	Chief Executive of EDF Energy; 2003 to 2017	Succeeded by Simone Rossi
