= FCC Environment =

Waste management company headquartered in Doncaster, England

FCC Environment (UK) Limited
- Type: Subsidiary
- Industry: Waste management
- Predecessor: Waste Recycling Group; Focsa Services UK
- Founded: May 2012; 14 years ago
- Headquarters: Doncaster, United Kingdom
- Area served: United Kingdom
- Key people: Steven Longdon (Chief executive officer)
- Number of employees: approx. 2,400
- Parent: Fomento de Construcciones y Contratas
- Website: www.fccenvironment.co.uk

FCC Environment (UK) Limited is a waste management company headquartered in Doncaster, United Kingdom and a wholly owned subsidiary of Fomento de Construcciones y Contratas. It was formed in May 2012 through the merger and rebranding of Focsa Services and Waste Recycling Group.

== History ==
Waste Recycling Group acquired Hanson Waste Management from Hanson plc for £185 million in cash in December 2000.

Waste Recycling Group was acquired by the private equity group Terra Firma Capital Partners for £315.2 million in June 2003.

In 2004, the UK assets of Shanks, the third largest landfill operator in the UK, were acquired by Terra Firma and merged with WRG.

In September 2006 Fomento de Construcciones y Contratas acquired Waste Recycling Group, excluding its landfill gas operations from Terra Firma for £1.4 billion. The landfill gas operations retained by Terra Firma were later rebranded as Infinis.

FCC continued to operate WRG and Focsa Services (The waste collections arm it already owned) separately until May 2012 when Focsa Services and Waste Recycling Group were merged and rebranded as "FCC Environment".

In December 2023 FCC Environment agreed to acquire the UK business of Urbaser and its subsidiary businesses for £398m. The transaction was later completed in 2024.

FCC later went on to acquire Cumbria Waste Group excluding its landfill operations in September 2025 with the deal being completed in October that year.

== See also ==
- Allington Quarry Waste Management Facility
- Greengairs Landfill
- Moore Nature Reserve
