= Economic impact of the COVID-19 pandemic in the United Kingdom =

- Map showing real GDP growth rates in 2020, as projected by the IMF
- Date: March 2020 – May 2023
- Type: Global recession
- Cause: COVID-19 pandemic-induced market instability and lockdown
- Outcome: UK cost of living crisis; Sharp rise in unemployment; Stress on supply chains; Decrease in government income; Collapse of the tourism industry; Collapse of the hospitality industry; Reduced consumer activity

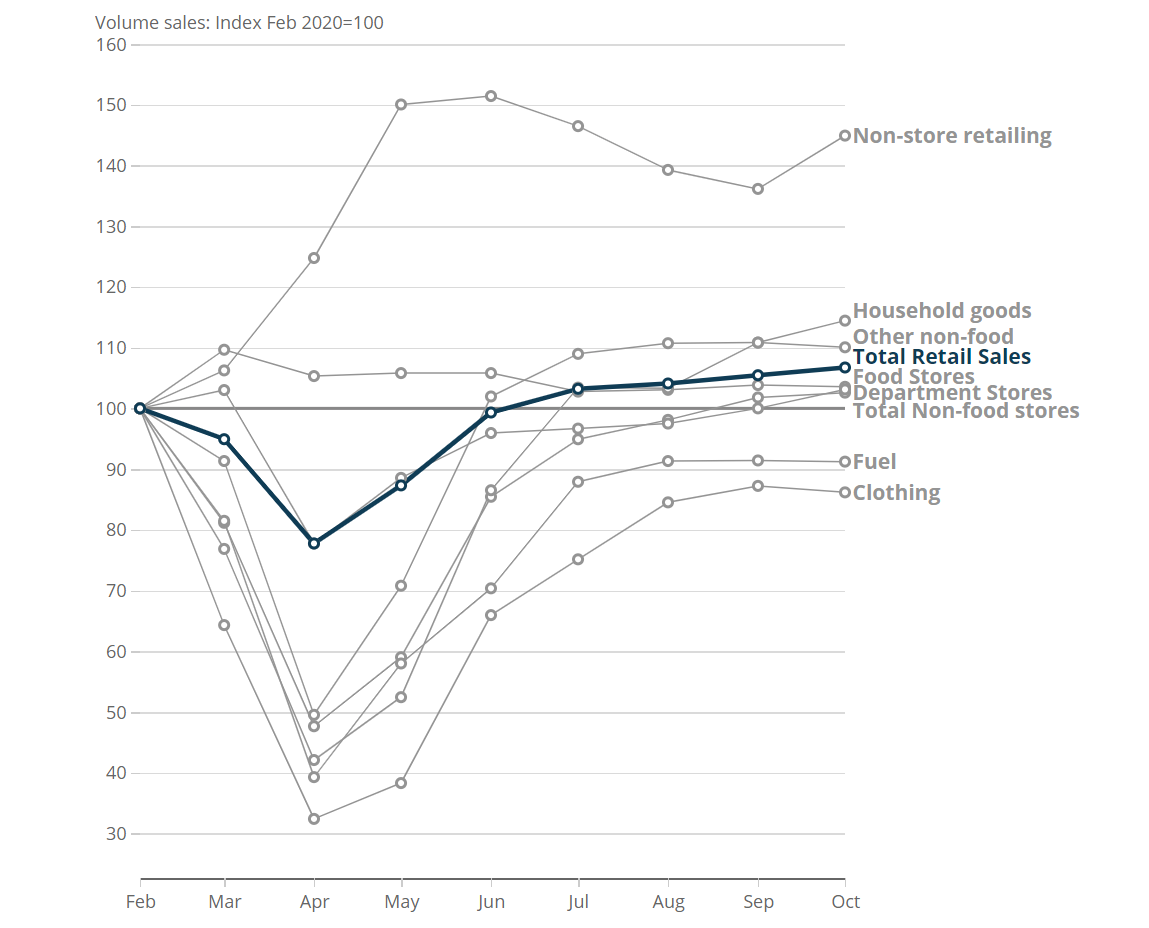
Volume sales, seasonally adjusted, Great Britain, February 2020 to October 2020

The economic impact of the global COVID-19 pandemic on the United Kingdom has been largely disruptive. It has adversely affected travel, financial markets, employment, a number of industries, and shipping.

== Charity fundraising ==
A number of charities reported significant drops in income as a funding hole of £4 billion was identified, as fund-raising events were cancelled.

Several individuals and groups began to raise funds for charitable organisations working to support those affected by the pandemic. 99-year-old Tom Moore raised over £28.2 million, the largest-ever amount raised by a JustGiving campaign.

The London Marathon, the world's biggest annual one-day fundraising event, was postponed from its April slot until October 2020. In 2019 £66.4m was raised for charities on the day of the Marathon. To compensate for the loss of income the Mass Participation Sports Organisers group organised The 2.6 Challenge.

On 18 April, several UK artists participated in Together at Home, a live music event in which artists performed in their own homes, in aid of the World Health Organization's COVID-19 Solidarity Response Fund. A version was broadcast on BBC One on 19 April.

Children in Need and Comic Relief announced their first joint initiative, The Big Night In, a telethon broadcast on 23 April. The event raised £27.4 million in just three hours. The UK Government promised to match the total.

Northern Ireland's Chief Charity Commissioner said that the public had been "very altruistic" in its support for Covid-response causes, such as the Big Night In, The 2.6 Challenge and Captain Tom Moore, and encouraged the public to consider all of the charities in existence.

The UK government announced a £750 million package of support for charities across the UK. £370 million of the money was set aside to support small, local charities working with vulnerable people, and was allocated to England, Scotland, Wales and Northern Ireland in the following breakdown

- £310 million for England
- £30 million for Scotland
- £20 million for Wales
- £10 million for Northern Ireland.

On 27 April Christian Aid advised that its annual fundraising week would go ahead through 10–16 May but without door-to-door envelope delivery and collection and the holding of associated face-to-face fundraising events in favour of encouraging online donations.

== Clothing retail ==
Edinburgh Woollen Mill (EWM), which employs 24,000 people in its retail group that includes clothing brands like Harris Tweed, Peacocks and Jaeger, announced in October 2020 that it will restructure and may sell parts of the group.

== Construction and property ==
Many construction sites initially remained operational following the introduction of social distancing rules. Following government advice, contractors including Mace paused work on 24 March. Confusion about what constituted essential work, along with contractors' enforcement of subcontractors' contractual obligations, meant some projects remained operational, and many site workers experienced highly variable application of social distancing precautions (some projects were temporarily halted after workers breached social distancing rules). In Scotland, work was ordered to be suspended on all non-essential construction projects from 6 April. Major contractors including Mace, McAlpine, Laing O'Rourke, Wates and Morgan Sindall each put hundreds of workers on furlough. ONS data published in June 2020 showed over 80% of construction businesses had furloughed staff; on average, firms furloughed 42% of their employees. In total, the government funded wages for around 1.5m construction workers, at a total cost (to the end of June 2020) of £5.4 billion. Contractor Wates Group was among the first to announce redundancies (300, around 8% of its workforce) and others followed; in June, the Construction Leadership Council said around 10% of construction workers could lose their jobs by September 2020.

By 17 April, work had halted on 2,434 UK sites (according to a Glenigan survey of projects with a construction value of more than £250,000); approximately £58bn or 35% of total UK construction value had been paused. Glenigan later updated its estimate to say 43% of sites stopped work during the first six weeks of the COVID-19 crisis, with 3,636 sites closed, including 466 in Scotland; Barbour ABI said 4,500 projects, with a total value of £70.7bn, had been delayed.

Reduced construction activity affected materials suppliers: Kingspan reported its UK business had been halved, with global revenues down a third; Marshalls plc reported a 27% drop in sales and contemplated 400 staff redundancies; and on 21 May builders' merchants reported Q1 sales down by 6.7% amid continued shortages of building materials.

In early May: data firm Builders' Conference said construction tender opportunities fell from a monthly average of 664 projects in the 12 months to March 2020 to 220 in April 2020, with 217 available until July; the IHS Markit/CIPS UK Construction Total Activity Index reported the steepest decline in UK construction output since the survey began in 1997; 115 contracts were awarded in April 2020 compared to 180 in April 2019, while the total value plunged from £2.82bn to £1.25bn, with clients wary of signing off large contracts; and an Irwin Mitchell/Centre for Economics & Business Research report said construction, losing around £300m a day, was one of the three most badly affected economic sectors. The most optimistic of three scenarios in a late May Construction Products Association (CPA) forecast predicted UK construction output would fall 25% in 2020 before rebounding in 2021 (but still finish 6% lower than 2019) due to the COVID-19 pandemic. ONS data showed construction output in Great Britain collapsed by a record 40.2% in April 2020; despite a rise in May, output was still down nearly 40% in February 2020 pre-pandemic levels. In August, after site working resumed more quickly than expected after lockdown, the CPA forecast construction output would fall by 20.6% in 2020.

Some contractors, including Mace and McAlpine, later reopened some sites in April. While some larger sites—for example, the £9bn Battersea Power Station redevelopment which had 4,000 workers prior to the lock-down—remained closed, almost 70% of sites in England and Wales operated by 36 Build UK major contractor members were working in late April, rising to 86% on 20 May. Trade union Unite called for the Health and Safety Executive to increase visits to police social distancing on sites. Construction workers became eligible for targeted COVID-19 testing on 28 April. On 10 May, Boris Johnson said construction workers should be "actively encouraged" to return to sites in England and Wales, but the Scottish Government said non-essential construction sites should remain closed. The following day, ONS data showed male construction workers were among those in low-skilled jobs most likely to die after contracting COVID-19 (between 9 March and 25 May, over 360 construction workers died). On 20 May 19% of projects in Scotland were running; on 21 May, Scotland first minister Nicola Sturgeon announced a gradual lifting of the lockdown in Scotland, with contractors cleared to start site preparations for a phased return to work from 28 May. In early June, Build UK members were operating 97% of sites in England and Wales; 21% of sites in Scotland were running.

Despite the return to site working, programme delays, rising costs, uncertainty about labour availability, social distancing measures, and material delays caused an estimated 35% drop in productivity.

=== Housebuilding and house sales ===
Following government advice, housebuilders including Barratt and Taylor Wimpey paused work on 24 March. By 8 April, work at 80% of UK housebuilding sites had stopped; Barratt put 5,000 of its 6,000 workers on furlough. By 17 April, around 44% of private housing and 32% of social housing schemes were suspended. In Scotland and Northern Ireland, where stricter lockdowns were enforced, 79% and 78% of schemes were suspended respectively. In May, the CPA estimated housebuilding activity had slumped 85% during the lockdown. Housebuilders including Barratt, Taylor Wimpey, Vistry, Persimmon, Redrow and Bellway planned to deploy safe working procedures and reopen sites in late April and early May. Bellway reported in June that sales had fallen by more than two-thirds since the introduction of lockdown, and expected "year-on-year sales activity to be severely constrained until a time when lockdown restrictions are further lifted." Redrow said site closures had pushed house sales down by a third.

An April analysis by estate agent Knight Frank forecast a 38% drop in house sales, equivalent to over half a million transactions, due to the effects of the coronavirus lockdown, reducing government revenues through a £4.4bn fall in stamp duty and a £1.6bn cut in VAT revenue. On 2 June, Nationwide reported house prices fell 1.7% in May from the previous month, the largest monthly fall for 11 years; HMRC data showed residential property transactions down 53% in April compared with 2019; Pantheon Macroeconomics predicted a 5% fall in prices by the end of the third quarter of 2020. On 1 July 2020, new Nationwide data showed a further monthly price fall, of 1.4%, and recorded the first year-on-year fall (0.1%) for eight years.

== Food retail ==
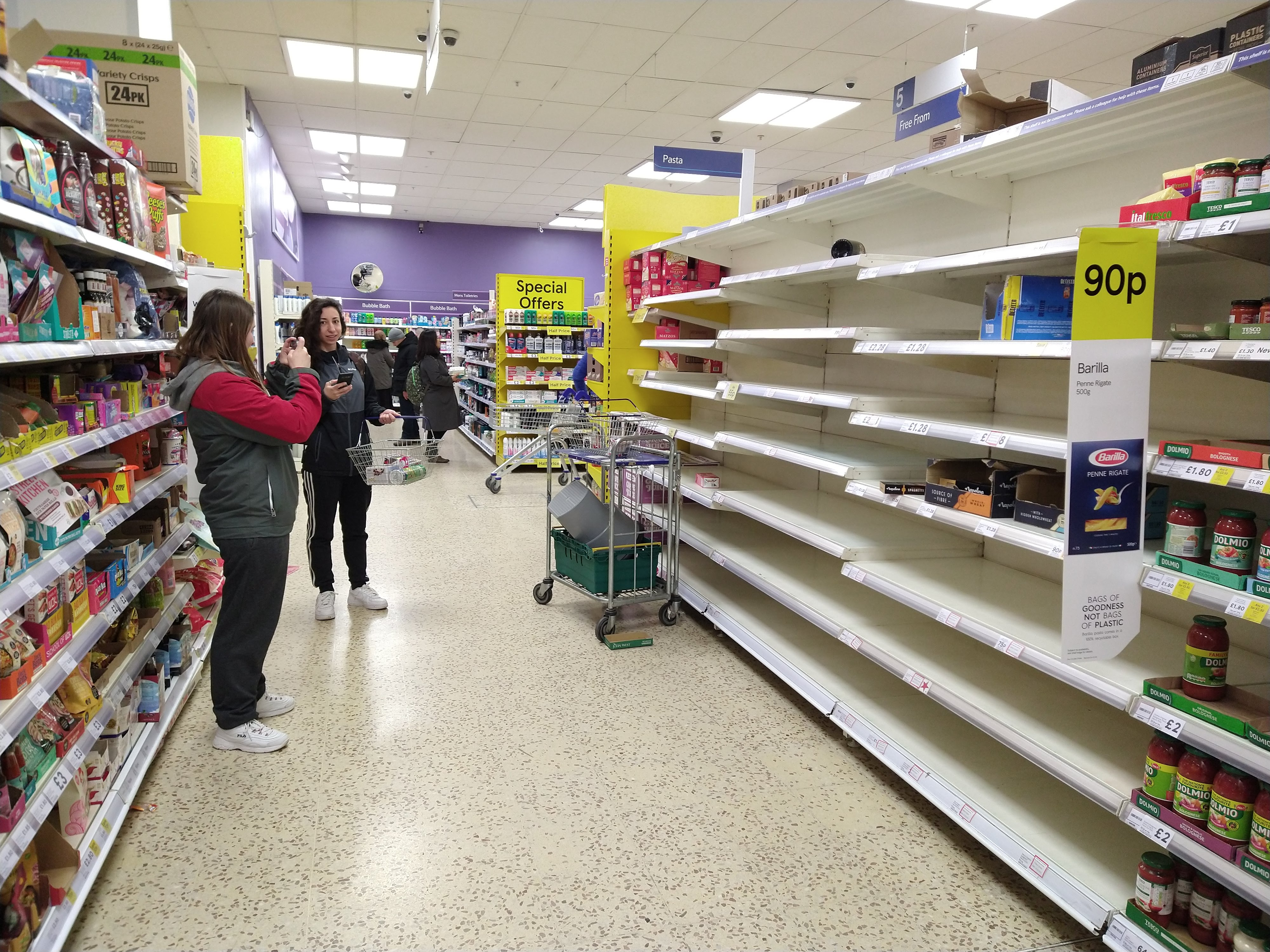
The almost empty pasta section in a London supermarket, 7 March 2020

In early March, The Guardian reported that British supermarkets and their suppliers had developed plans to ensure adequate food supplies in case of panic buying. There were reports of hand sanitiser and anti-bacterial products selling out at some supermarkets. Online retailers reported consumers placing unusually large orders while the managing director of the frozen food chain Iceland reported increased sales of "multibuy deals and larger packs".

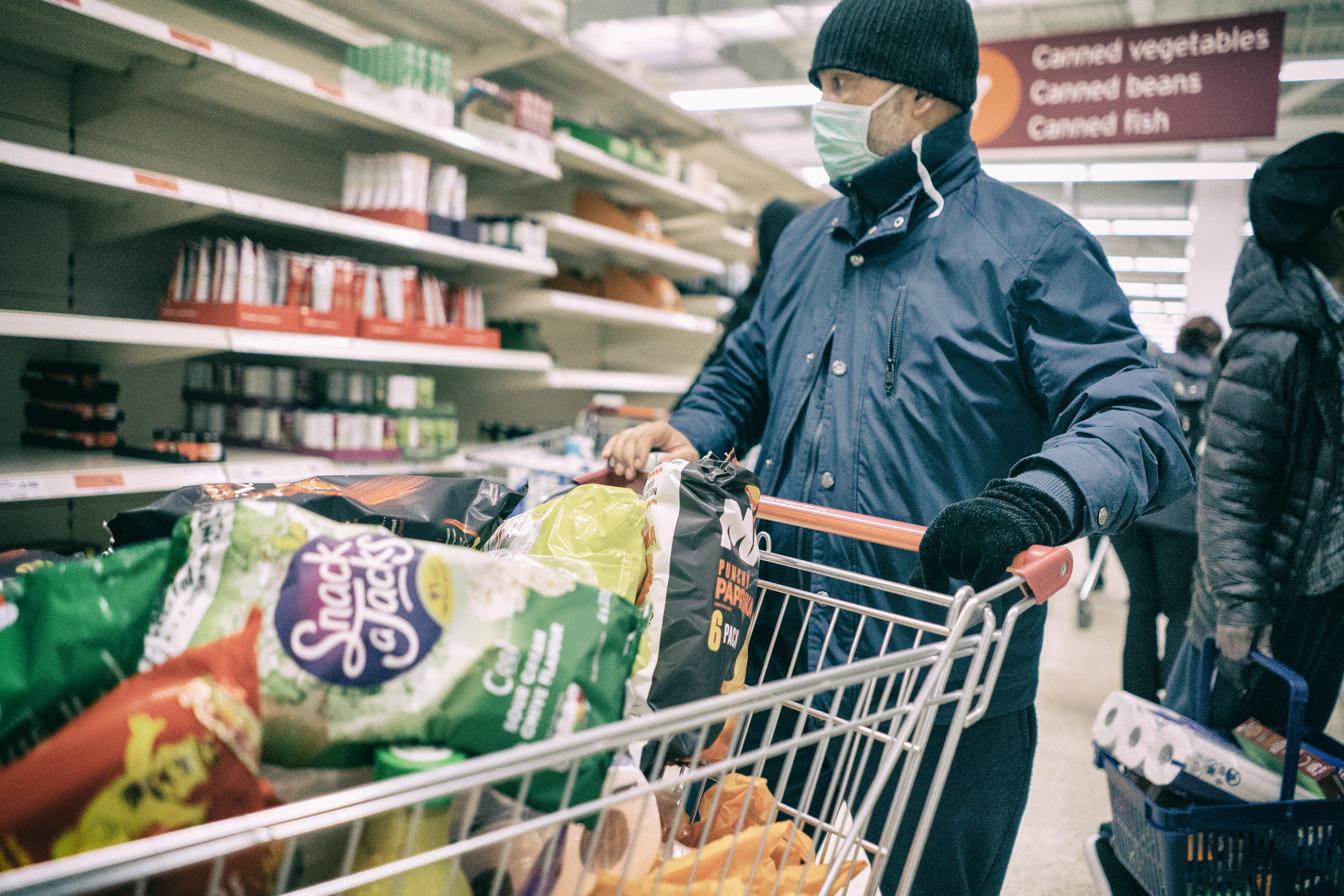
People in London buying more canned foods and toilet paper, 18 March 2020

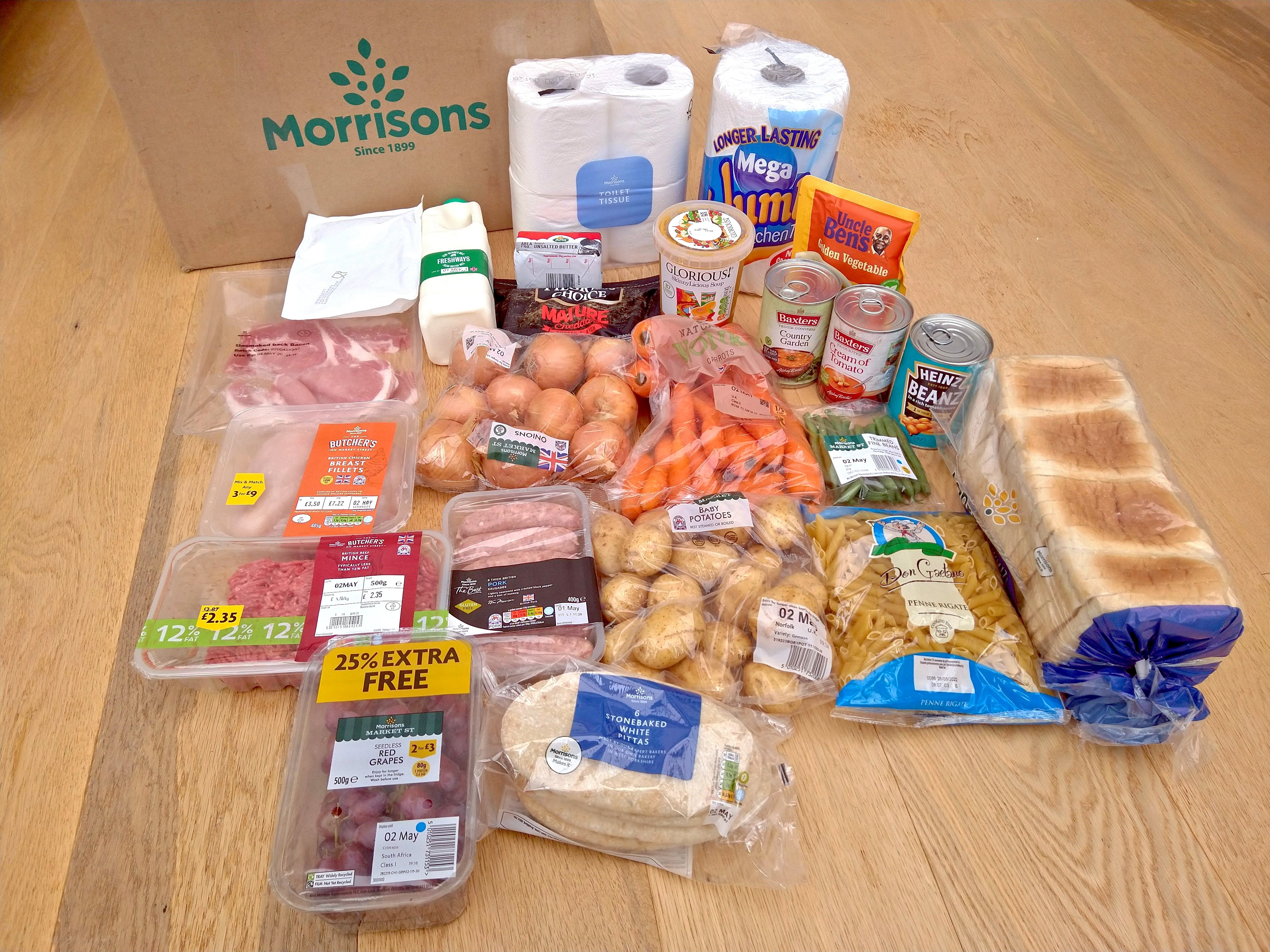
Contents of a food box supplied by supermarket Morrisons in response to the pandemic and described as sufficient to feed two adults for one week

Some supermarkets and other shops responded by limiting the quantity of popular items that each customer could buy, while others had a limit across their entire range. Sainsbury's introduced a dedicated shopping hour for elderly and disabled customers, as well as giving them priority for online deliveries. Other supermarkets such as Iceland and Morrisons also introduced measures, with Morrisons introducing a range of basic food boxes, to feed two adults for one week. Sainsbury's further announced on 21 March that they would give healthcare workers allocated shopping hours on three mornings a week.

Amazon stopped sellers from sending non-essential products to their warehouses. Selfridges closed all its stores and sold only online.

In response to panic buying, Professor Stephen Powis, medical director at NHS England, said on 21 March that NHS staff were being deprived of food supplies because of the activities of some consumers, and urged people to shop responsibly. Helen Dickinson, head of the British Retail Consortium said that sufficient food was available. She added that an extra £1bn had been spent on food in the preceding three weeks. Environment Secretary George Eustice also urged shoppers to stop panic buying. On the same day several supermarkets began to recruit additional staff.

On 21 March, the government announced that the 5p charge for carrier bags would be waived for online deliveries.

Sainsbury's removed purchasing limits on most items from 5 April. On 8 April Tesco said it could not meet the increased demand for online shopping despite expanding its home delivery service, and 85–90% of food would need to be bought in store.

== Finance and the economy ==
The governor of the Bank of England called on the British government to provide support to businesses affected by the virus and was reported to be working with the Treasury to provide an economic stimulus package to prevent the British economy falling into recession. Companies listed on the London stock markets have fallen in value, with commentators citing worries about the virus. To stimulate the economy, the Bank of England cut its bank rate of interest from 0.75% to 0.25%. On 19 March, the interest rate was again cut, this time to 0.10%—the lowest rate in the bank's 325-year existence. On 28 March, Fitch Ratings downgraded the UK's government debt rating from AA to AA−, because of coronavirus borrowing, economic decline, and lingering uncertainty over Brexit. The ratings agency believed the UK's government deficit for 2020 might equal 9% of gross domestic product (GDP), compared to 2% the previous year. The government extended its overdraft with the Bank of England. The Bank of England forecasted, on 7 May, that this would turn into the UK's worst recession since the "Great Frost" over 300 years ago. The Bank also predicted that the economy would recover in 2021.

During the second half of March, 1 million British workers applied for the Universal Credit benefit scheme. In April people claiming unemployment benefit rose to 2.1 million, a jump of 856,500 claims according to the Office for National Statistics (ONS). In addition the employment rate fell to 3.9% for the first quarter of the year; this period included the first week of lockdown according to ONS figure.

The Resolution Foundation surveyed 6,000 workers, and concluded that 30% of those in the lowest income bracket had been affected by the pandemic compared with 10% of those in the top fifth of earners. The foundation said that about a quarter of 18 to 24-year-olds included in the research had been furloughed whilst another 9% had lost their job altogether. They also said that 35 to 44-year olds were least likely to be furloughed or lose their jobs with only around 15% of the surveyed population having experienced these outcomes. Earlier research by the Institute for Fiscal Studies concluded that young people (those under 25) and women were more likely to be working in a shutdown business sector.

In early April, as the second quarter began, the Office for Budget Responsibility predicted that unemployment could rise to 3.4 million and the GDP could fall by 35% during the quarter. By June, the unemployment projection proved correct, with over 3 million out of work for at least three months and another 4 million out of work for a shorter period. Although GDP fell by only 20% during the second quarter, this was still the worst quarterly economic pullback since records began in 1955.

On 25 November 2020, the Chancellor of the Exchequer delivered a Spending Review which revealed that the United Kingdom would face the worst slump in 300 years due to the impact of COVID-19. The anticipated slump this year will be near to −10%, such significant economic decline that it could surpass the Great Frost of 1709. The economic report indicated that the unemployment rate could reach 7.5% in 2021 with the number of people out of work peaking at around 2.6 million. GDP was expected to contract by 11.3% in 2020.

== Hospitality ==
On 16 March, Boris Johnson appealed for people to avoid social places including pubs, clubs and restaurants, then, on 20 March, requested their closure from that evening.

A June 2020 ONS survey showed that, in the first half of May, the accommodation and food services sector had the largest proportion of the workforce furloughed, at 83%.

Some fast food takeaway and drive-through outlets began to reopen in late May. Pubs, hotels, and restaurants were permitted to reopen on 4 July as social distancing rules were relaxed.

Tourism, in general, throughout the UK (by visitors from both the UK and from other countries) declined substantially due to travel restrictions and lockdowns. For much of 2020, and into 2021, vacation travel was not permitted and entry into the UK was very strictly limited. Business travel, for example, declined by nearly 90% over previous years. This not only affected revenue from tourism but also led to numerous job losses.

=== Fast food ===
Fast food and drink outlets Pret a Manger and McDonald's (among others) at first announced that they would not permit customers to sit and eat on the premises, but customers could still order products to take away and consume off the premises. On 22 March McDonald's announced it would close all outlets in the UK and Ireland by 7 pm on 23 March. Nando's announced later the same day they would also close their outlets. Some chains reopened selected takeaway and drive-through outlets as lockdown measures eased in late May. By early July, Pret a Manger had reopened 339 of its 410 shops but planned to close 30 outlets and cut at least 1,000 jobs at other shops in a post-pandemic restructuring.

=== Pubs ===
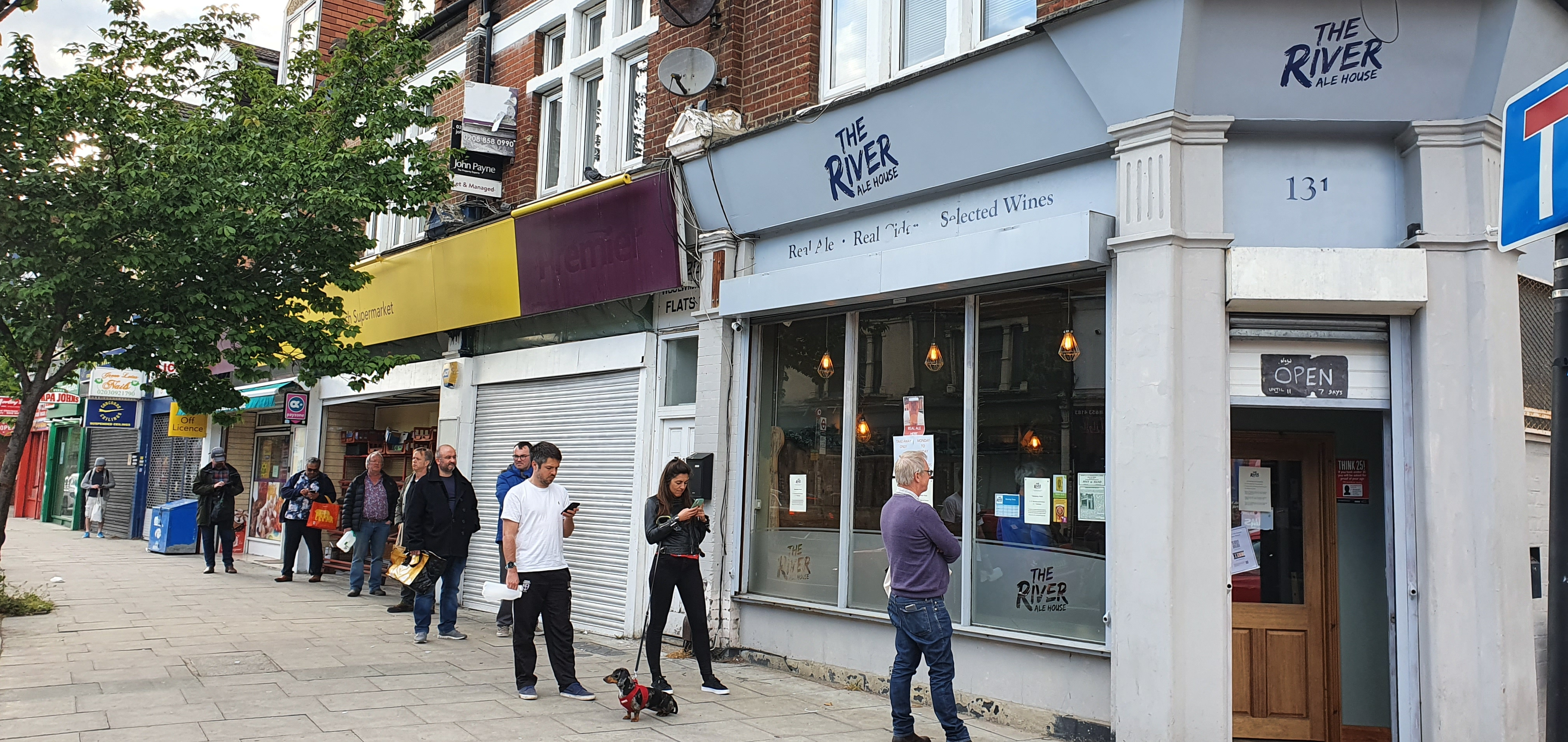
People queuing to buy takeaway beer in London on 1 May 2020

Initially, the pub chain J D Wetherspoon remained open, seeking to promote social distancing, including spacing out tables more and encouraging use of its mobile app to order food and drink, but from 20 March, Wetherspoon pubs closed in line with government instructions. On 25 March, off-licences were added to the list of essential businesses allowed to stay open, also enabling pubs and brewery taprooms with licences to sell beer for home consumption to offer takeaway sales and home deliveries.

=== Hotels ===
Hotels were badly affected, with Keith Barr, chief executive of InterContinental Hotels Group (IHG) warning the industry faced its "most significant challenge" ever. IHG occupancy levels fell to historic lows in the first quarter with revenue per available room down 55% in March 2020 compared with 2019, and expected to drop to 80% in April. Some hotels were used to provide NHS patient accommodation and free up space for COVID-19 cases, to provide accommodation for NHS and other key workers, and to house homeless people.

=== Restaurants ===
On 18 May, Casual Dining Group (CDG), owner of about 250 Bella Italia, Café Rouge and Las Iguanas restaurants, said it was preparing to call in administrators, potentially putting 6,000 jobs at risk. On 22 May, it was estimated over 30,000 UK pubs and restaurants might remain permanently closed after the lockdown. On 3 June, Restaurant Group, owner of chains including Frankie & Benny's and Garfunkel's, told employees a "large number" of its outlets would not reopen after lockdown; up to 120 restaurants, mainly Frankie & Benny's, were set to close permanently. On 29 June 2020, Byron Hamburgers announced it was preparing to place the 51-restaurant chain into administration. SSP Group announced it was cutting 5,000 UK jobs across its chains, including Upper Crust and Caffè Ritazza, as part of a restructuring aimed at keeping the company afloat. On 2 July 2020, CDG announced the group had been placed into administration, with 91 outlets set to close with the loss of 1,900 jobs. On 17 July, Azzurri Group, owner of the Zizzi and ASK Italian chains, announced the closure of 75 restaurants with the loss of up to 1,200 jobs. On 31 July, Byron closed 31 of its 51 branches, shedding 650 jobs.

== Transport ==
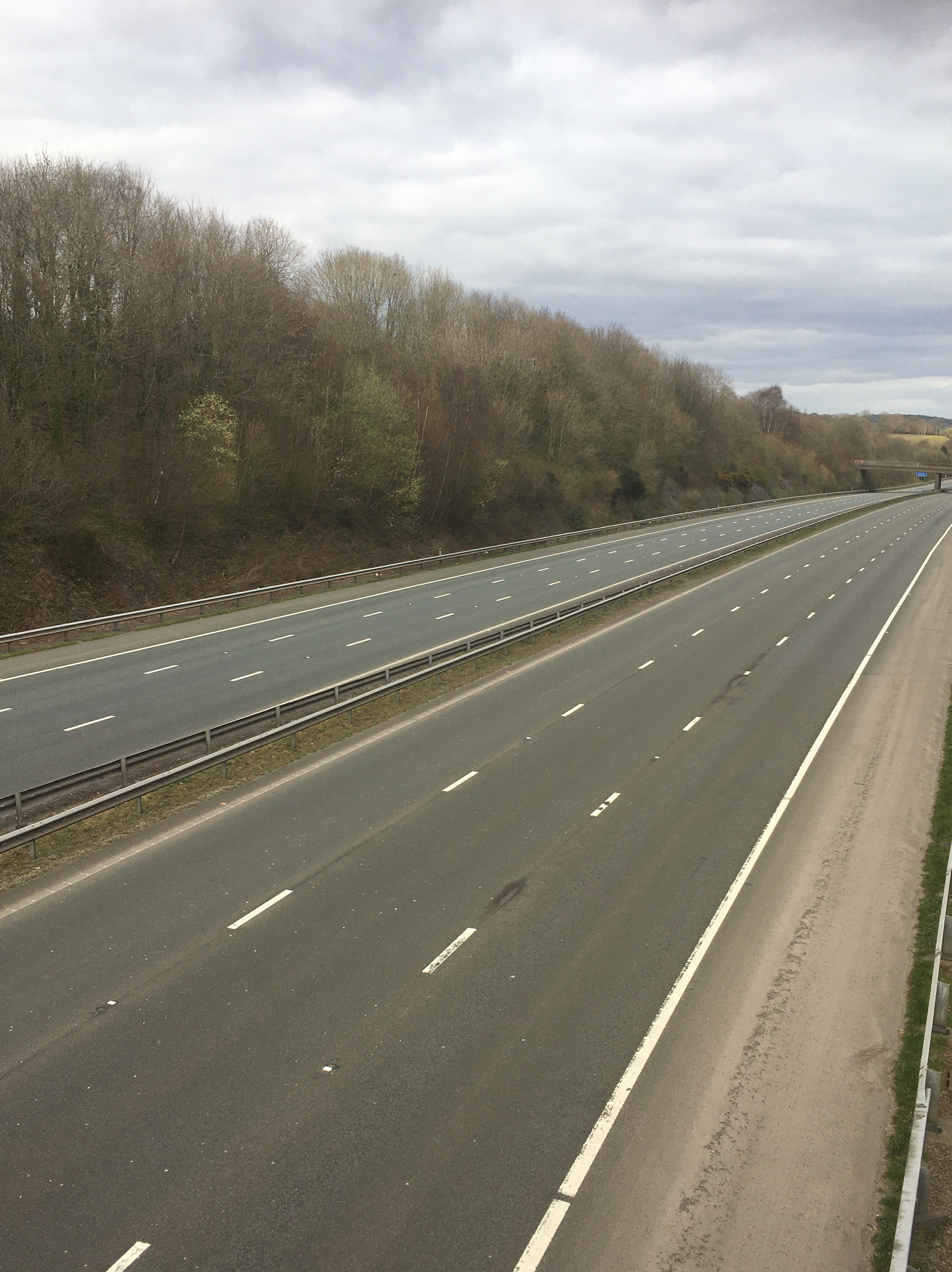
An empty M4 motorway in Cardiff on the afternoon of Saturday, 28 March 2020

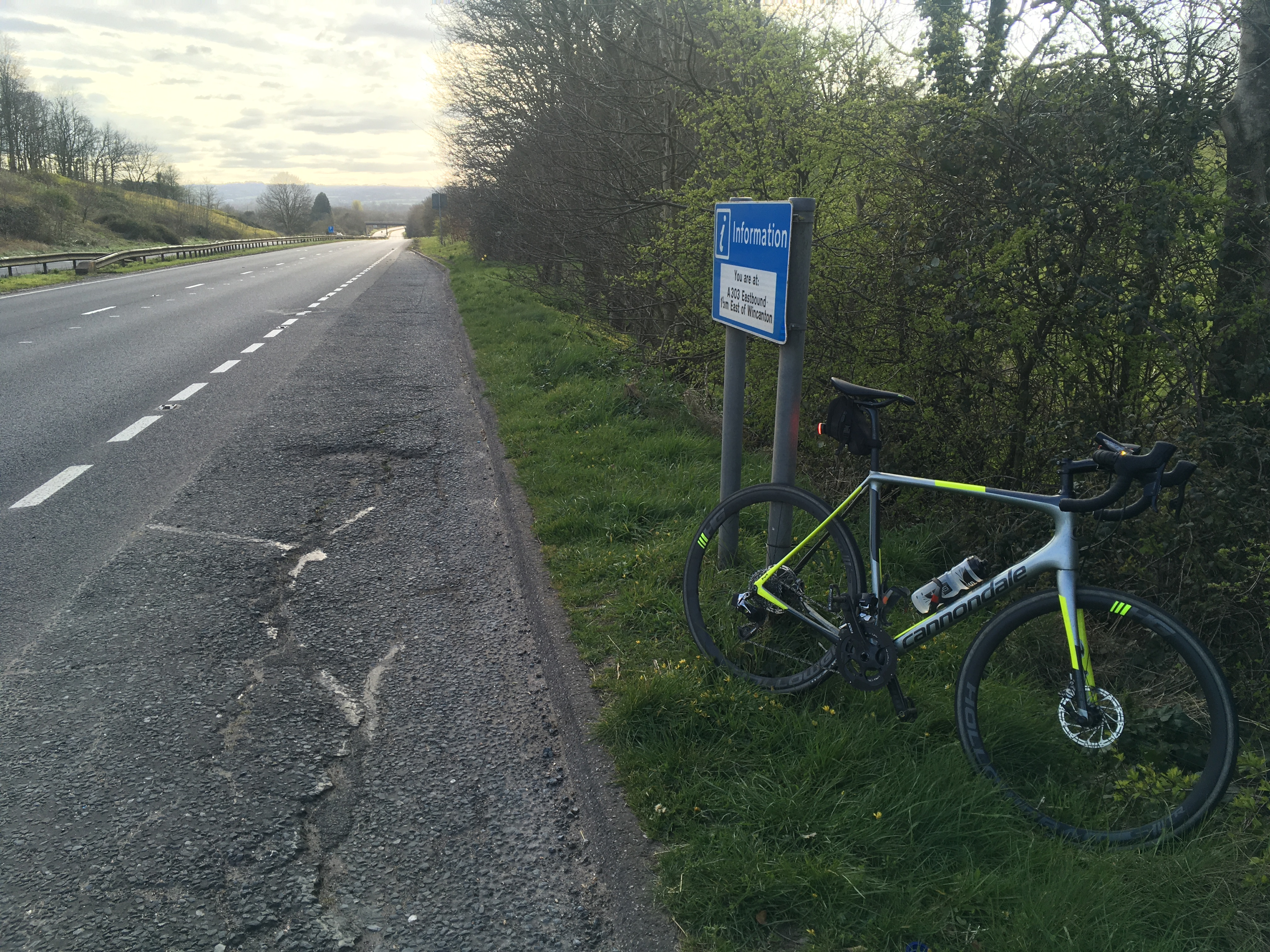
Bicycle on the A303, afternoon of 28 March 2020

Following the late March introduction of lockdown restrictions, UK road traffic volumes dropped to levels last experienced in the 1950s, with corresponding falls in air and noise pollution. In May, as lockdown road traffic levels slowly grew, but remained around 35% to 45% of usual levels, the AA said volumes were similar to those of the early 1970s.

In April 2020, petrol prices fell below £1/litre at some outlets. When Morrison's supermarket chain became the first national retailer of petrol in the UK to sell petrol at under £1 a litre, it was the first time since February 2016.

=== Aviation ===
From the latter half of January, Heathrow Airport received additional clinical support and tightened surveillance of the three direct flights it receives from Wuhan every week; each were to be met by a Port Health team. Later, airlines including British Airways and Ryanair announced a number of flight cancellations for March.

Regional airline Flybe, already struggling financially, entered administration and ceased operations the following day. Having already put some 23,000 workers on furlough, on 28 April British Airways' parent IAG announced a restructuring and redundancy programme potentially resulting in 12,000 BA job redundancies. EasyJet laid off 4,000 UK-based cabin crew for two months. On 5 May, Virgin Atlantic announced it was cutting 3,000 jobs and quitting Gatwick Airport.

On 25 March, London City Airport temporarily closed. Heathrow Airport closed one runway from 6 April, while Gatwick Airport closed one terminal and reduced runway hours. Most other UK airports also significantly scaled back operations and put airport expansion plans on hold.

In May, a 14-day mandatory quarantine period for anyone arriving from outside the UK or Ireland was announced, which was criticised by Airlines UK. This excluded those travelling from the Channel Islands, Isle of Man, Ireland and selected occupations. If a person arrived and did not have a place to isolate then they would be asked to go into Government accommodation, which they would have to pay for. Each nation could decide how they would enforce the new rules.

On 3 July, the British Government published a full list of countries where quarantine will not apply These countries include Greece, Spain, France and Belgium, to come into effect from 10 July. Countries such as China, US, Sweden and Portugal are not, meaning arrivals from those have to isolate for 14 days. Scotland and Wales are yet to decide whether to ease travel restrictions and described the changes as "shambolic". The quarantine rules would also remain in place in Northern Ireland for visitors arriving from outside of the UK and Republic of Ireland.

On 7 October 2020, a new Global Travel Taskforce was announced by the Transport Secretary with the aim of helping international travel return to safe operation.

On 17 November, United Airlines Flight 14 landed at London Heathrow, the first transatlantic flight where all the passengers had been mandatorily tested and found negative for coronavirus prior to departure at Newark Airport, New York.

=== Public transport ===
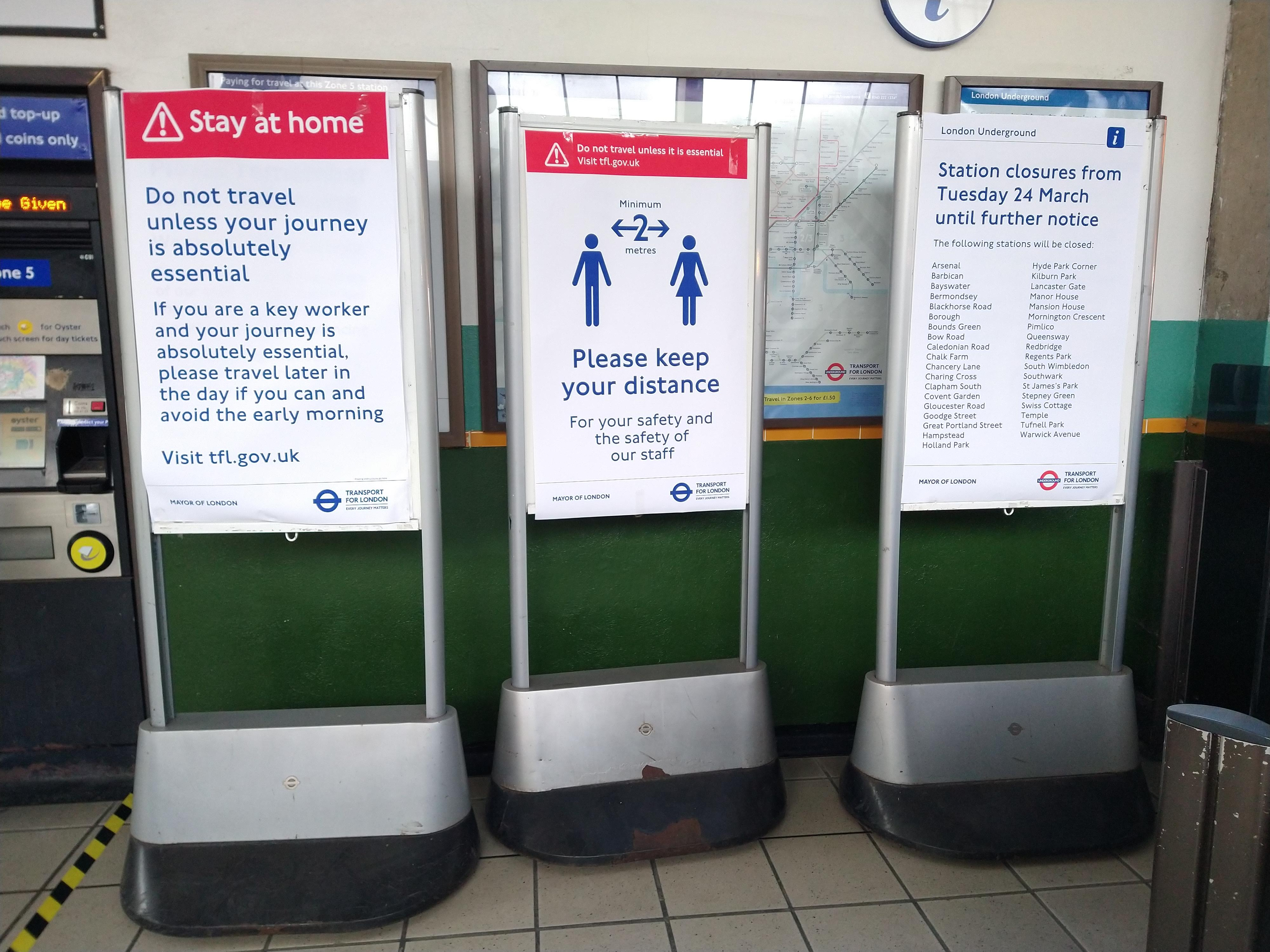
"Stay at home" and "Please keep your distance" notices on the London Underground, 27 March 2020

On 20 March the government announced emergency measures to safeguard the nation's rail network, with season ticket holders given refunds if remote working, and rail franchise agreements nationalised for at least six months to prevent train operating companies from collapsing. From 30 March, open-access operator Hull Trains suspended all services, with Grand Central following shortly afterwards. Govia Thameslink Railway also suspended its Gatwick Express service. Other operators reduced their timetables.

On 19 March, the Stagecoach Supertram light rail network in Sheffield announced that they would be switching to a modified Sunday service from 23 March until further notice. Local bus operators First South Yorkshire and Stagecoach Yorkshire, which operate across the same area, announced that they would also be switching to a reduced timetable from 23 March. National Express suspended all its long-distance coach services from 6 April.

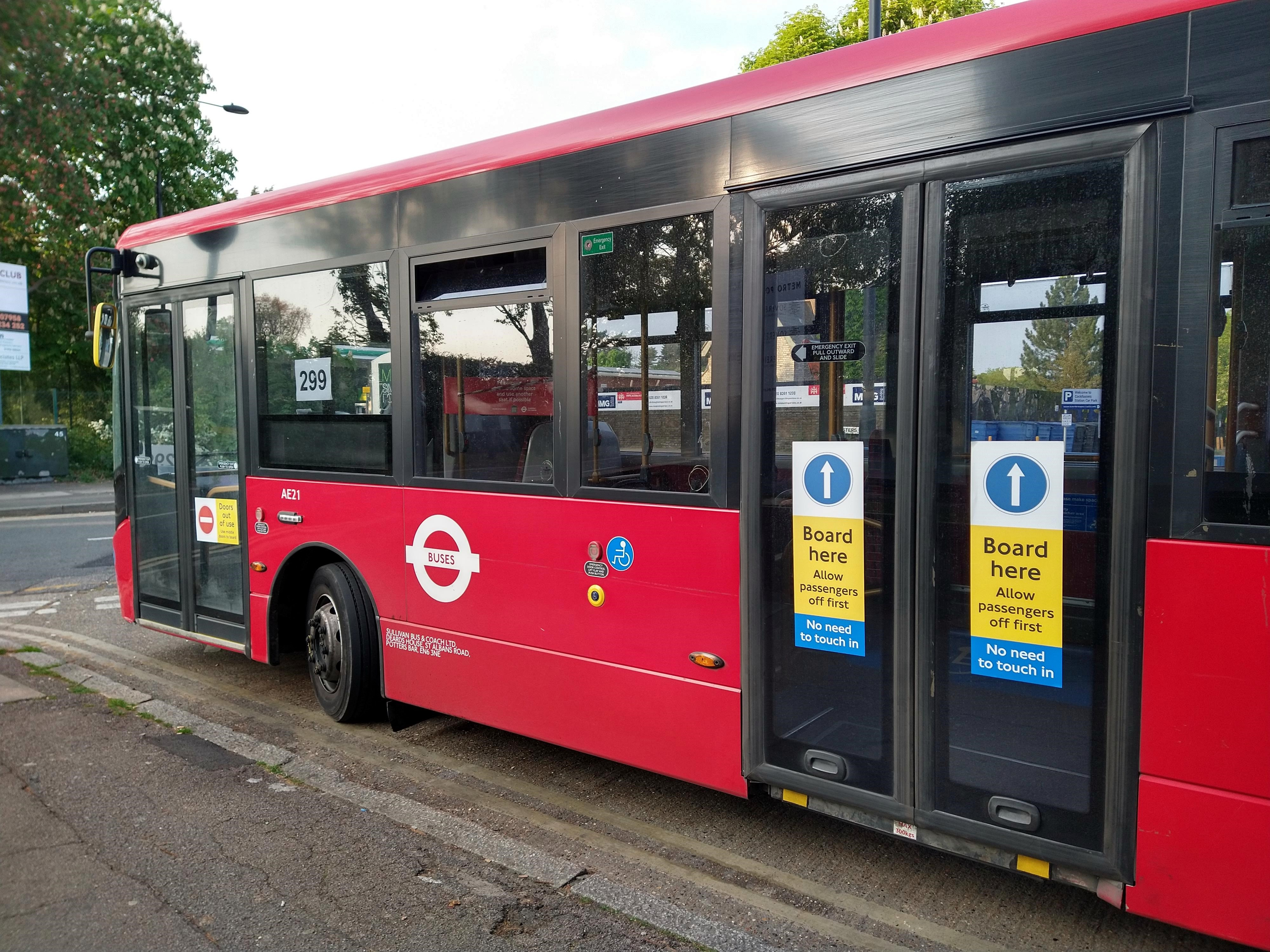
London bus with COVID-19 central door entry

Transport for London (TfL) services were reduced in stages. All Night Overground and Night Tube services, as well as all services on the Waterloo & City line, were suspended from 20 March, and 40 tube stations were closed on the same day. The Mayor of London and TfL urged people to use public transport only if absolutely essential, so it could be used by critical workers.

In April, TfL directed passengers to board buses by the middle or rear doors and not "touch in" to reduce the risks to their drivers, after the deaths of 14 TfL workers including nine drivers.

Due to a huge decline in fares income, on 7 May TfL requested £2 billion in state aid to keep services running until September 2020. on 12 May, TfL documents warned it expected to lose £4bn due to the pandemic and said it needed £3.2bn to balance a proposed emergency budget for 2021, having lost 90% of its overall income. Without an agreement with the government, TfL risked insolvency. On 14 May, the UK Government agreed £1.6bn in emergency funding for TfL.

In April, Govia Thameslink Railway re-branded three trains with special liveries to show its support for the NHS and the 200,000 essential workers commuting on GTR's network every week.

On 8 May, Transport Secretary Grant Shapps said that even with all public transport services running as normal across the country, when the two-metre social distancing rules were applied, the network would be a running at 10% of normal capacity. Shapps also said that there had been an increase in walking and cycling, with people on bikes up by 70% in some areas. The Department for Transport announced plans for improving cycle networks, and said that when lockdown ended, more people would need to walk or cycle to work to ease congestion across transport networks.

On 4 June, Shapps announced that passengers and staff on public transport in England would, from 15 June, be required to wear face coverings while travelling, and that anyone failing to do so would be liable to be refused travel or fined. Research from Transport Focus suggested that passenger compliance would be dependent on being prompted by members of staff. Although implementation was initially to be by changes to the National Rail Conditions of Travel and the Public Service Vehicles Regulations, the 15 June Health Protection (Coronavirus, Wearing of Face Coverings on Public Transport) (England) Regulations 2020 were ultimately enacted by Shapps under his emergency powers deriving from the Public Health (Control of Disease) Act 1984.

== Betting shops ==
William Hill, which operates many in-person betting shops, reported that its profits during the first half of 2020 dropped by 85% compared to the previous year. It planned to permanently close over a hundred shops.

== See also ==
- COVID-19 recession
- Economic effects of Brexit
