= Pumpkin Café Shop =

Café shop chain in Great Britain

- The logo of Pumpkin Café Shop

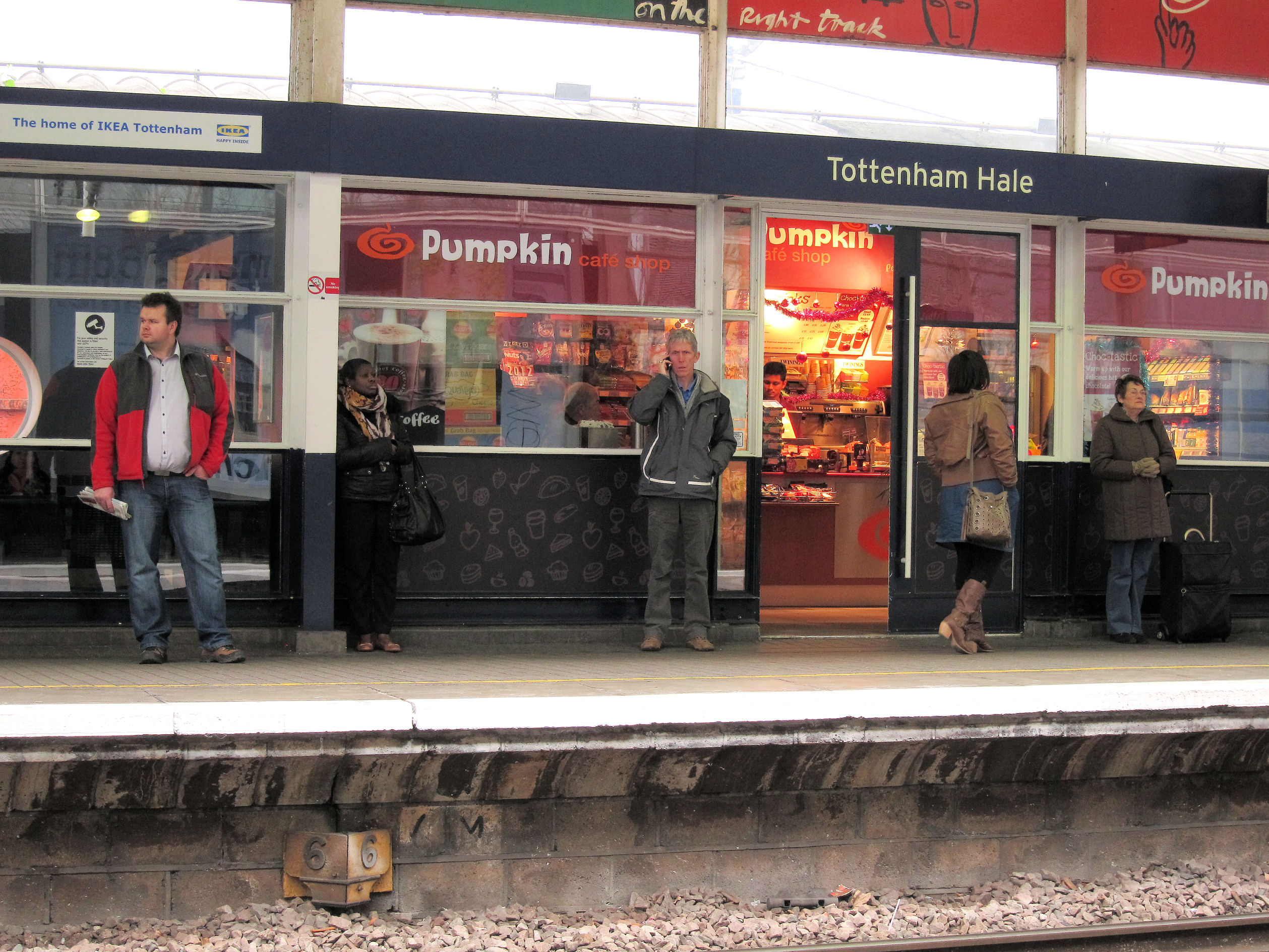
- A Pumpkin Café Shop in Tottenham Hale
- Company type: Station Café
- Industry: Food Retail
- Area served: Railway stations and hospitals in Great Britain

Pumpkin Café Shop is a chain of café shops located at hospitals, ports, and railway stations in Great Britain. It is a sub-brand owned by the SSP Group, which owns or franchises many other food shop brands such as Caffè Ritazza and Upper Crust.

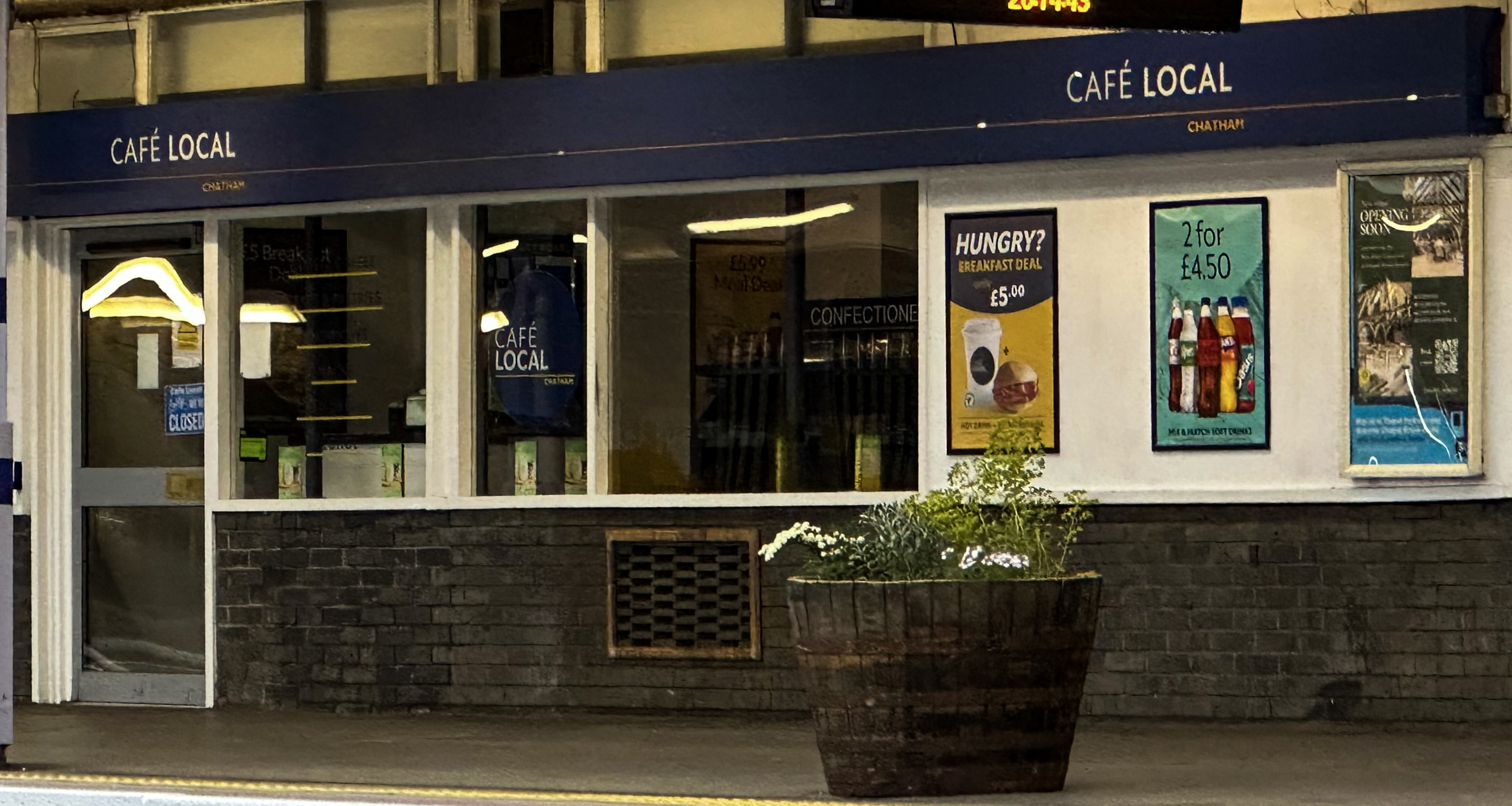
Café Local at Chatham railway station

As of 2023, some Pumpkin Café Shops are rebranding as 'Café Local' or as licensed brands such as Starbucks.
