= Pumpkin (disambiguation) =

Pumpkin is a large orange squash fruit (vegetable) of the genus Cucurbita.

Pumpkin may also refer to:

== Entertainment ==
- Pumpkin (film), a 2002 film
- Pumpkin, a Buckethead album
- The Great Pumpkin, an unseen character from the comic strip Peanuts by Charles M. Schulz
- It's the Great Pumpkin, Charlie Brown, the third prime time animated television special from 1966, also based on the comic strip Peanuts by Charles M. Schulz
- The Great Pumpkin (film), 'Il grande cocomero', an Italian film (1993)
- Big Pumpkin, a 1992 children's book by Erica Silverman

== People ==
- Pumpkin (musician), hip hop singer
- David S. Pumpkins, a Saturday Night Live character portrayed by Tom Hanks

== Other uses ==
- Pumpkin (color), the color of the fruit
- Pumpkin, Georgia, a community in the United States
- Pumpkin case, a 2007 criminal investigation
- Pumpkin Café Shop, a chain of café shops in The UK
- Pumpkin suit, popular name for the orange colored space suits used by space shuttle crews.
- Pumpkin, an Anything Muppet pattern used on Sesame Street which is an orange rod puppet with a long, oval-shaped head
- The Smashing Pumpkins, an alternative rock band from Chicago
- The Splashing Pumpkins, an alternative name for Huey, Dewey, and Louie's house band on House of Mouse
- Pumpkin bomb, a weapon used in the Second World War
- The "Pumpkin Papers" from the prosecution of Alger Hiss
- colloquial term for a differential
