= Great Pumpkin (disambiguation) =

The Great Pumpkin is an unseen character from Charles M. Schulz's Peanuts comic.

Great Pumpkin may also refer to:

- 2015 TB145 (nicknamed "Great Pumpkin"), a near-Earth sub-kilometer asteroid
- The Great Pumpkin (film), a 1993 Italian drama film directed by Francesca Archibugi
- The Great Pumpkin Coaster, a junior steel roller coaster at Kings Island
- It's the Great Pumpkin, Charlie Brown, a 1966 American animated Halloween television special

== See also ==
- Giant pumpkin – Unusually large pumpkins
- Pumpkin (disambiguation)
