= Tortilla (disambiguation) =

A tortilla is a soft, thin flatbread made out of maize (corn tortilla) or wheat flour (flour tortilla).

Tortilla may also refer to:

- Omelette, an egg dish called a tortilla in European and South American Spanish
  - Spanish omelette or Spanish tortilla, an egg-and-potato dish in Spanish cuisine
- Tortilla (restaurant chain), a UK-based Mexican-cuisine restaurant chain

== See also ==
- Tortilla chip, a snack food
- Tortiya, a town in Ivory Coast
