= Picfair =

Picfair is an online photography brand and ecommerce platform that helps amateur and professional photographers sell their work through personal online stores and a central marketplace. It was founded in 2013 by former The Guardian and The New York Times journalist Benji Lanyado. It has over 500,000 photographers using the platform.

== History ==
Benji Lanyado quit his job in journalism in order to learn how to code at the General Assembly coding school in London. His first coding project, a streamlined version of Reddit called The Reddit Edit, attracted the attention of Reddit founder Alexis Ohanian. Lanyado pitched the idea of Picfair to Ohanian in a New York City coffee shop and Ohanian went on to invest in the company as part of Picfair's initial seed investment round, which also included Google Ventures partner Tom Hulme and the founders of VoucherCodes.co.uk.

Having built the site himself and launched it in beta in 2013, Lanyado launched Picfair officially in 2014 as an open-to-all marketplace that allowed photographers to upload their images.

By 2016, Picfair had 3 million images on the platform and had developed a curation algorithm that helped high quality images appear at the top of image searches.

The company attracted a further £1.5m in funding in 2017 from The Claverley Group (owners of the Wolverhampton Express & Star), JustPark CEO Anthony Eskinazi and What3Words founder Chris Sheldrick. At this point Picfair had 25,000 photographers using the platform.

In 2018, Picfair launched personalised stores in parallel to its central marketplace, giving the 35,000 photographers now using the platform their own stand-alone store to sell digital downloads and prints.

== Partnerships and controversy ==
In 2016, following UK Home Secretary Amber Rudd's suggestion that businesses should declare how many non-UK workers they have, Picfair founder Benji Lanyado tweeted that he would refuse to comply, telling the BBC that his opposition to the plan was "not a business decision, but a very simple moral one", going on to state that "[the UK] needs to be seen as an exciting, global hub for exceptional companies and ideas, not an inward-looking island that is happy to scare its foreigners for the sake of political bargaining."

In 2018 Picfair partnered with The Guardian to launch Women Behind the Lens, a competition highlighting the work of female photographers, who are underrepresented in the photographic industries. The winning entries were exhibited at The Guardian's offices in Kings Place.

Picfair also partnered with non-profit The Photography Movement on a month-long exploration into the benefits of photography on mental health, culminating in £20,000 of mental health and photography grants being awarded.
