= LOVESPACE =

Storage company

- Website: http://lovespace.co.uk
- Type: Startup
- Founder: Brett Akker
- Managing Director: Steve Folwell

LOVESPACE offers by-the-box storage and storage unit services with collection and delivery in the United Kingdom. The company also provides packing and shipping services as well as operational and logistical support to small businesses by transporting equipment, storing archival documents and storing surplus stock.

== History ==
LOVESPACE was established in 2011 by cofounders Brett Akker and Carl August Ameln. Brett Akker had previously founded the carsharing company Streetcar. Carl August Ameln was the founder of City Self-Storage, a multi-national chain of self-storage centres. Ameln had previously been an investor in Streetcar.

A pilot service launched in 2012 and in 2013 LOVESPACE hired Steve Folwell as managing director. He was previously the director of business development and group director of strategy at the Guardian Media Group. With a focus on students, house movers and space-constrained and small businesses, the company launched a full service later that year. Steve Folwell was promoted to CEO in 2014. In 2015 LOVESPACE moved to a new warehouse in order to accommodate growth.

== Investment ==
Smedvig Capital and First Risk Capital were initial investors. Both companies have had experience in the storage industry. A 2014 fundraising campaign on the crowdfunding platform CrowdCube raised £1.55m, surpassing its £600k target to be overfunded by 167%.

In 2015, the company raised £1.1m in a round which was led by commercial property provider Workspace Group bringing the total funding to £4m.
