= Parcel2Go =

Parcel2go.com Limited
- Website type: Private
- Headquarters: Bolton, Lancashire
- Founders: Fil Adams-Mercer; Richard Adams-Mercer; Steven Kramer
- Key people: Paul Doble (CEO)
- Industry: Parcel delivery comparison website
- Employees: 180
- Website: www.parcel2go.com

Parcel2Go is a British parcel delivery comparison website providing comparisons of domestic and international postage options from different providers.

== History ==
The company was founded in 2001 by father and son Fil and Richard Adams-Mercer together with colleague Steven Kramer. At that time neither United Parcel Service nor DHL were offering online access to their courier parcel services.

In 2009 the company announced a turnover of £11.6 million. In September 2017 Parcel2Go acquired National Pallets of Heathfield, East Sussex, the expected benefit for National Pallets being improved IT support, whilst giving Parcel2go an option to offer customers a pallet service for larger deliveries. In November 2019, the company launched a £500,000 fundraising attempt on Crowdcube. A management buyout was backed by Mayfair Equity Partners.

By 2019 the number of employees had risen to 230, and annual turnover to over £100 million. In 2022 alone, merchants using Smart Send dispatched 4.2 million parcels via Parcel2Go’s network. Parcel2Go in recent years appeared in the GM 125 Rising Stars of Business 2024, citied as the "UK’s leading online parcel courier marketplace".

Sven Storkofferson, an animated stork character introduced in 2023, serves as the company’s parcel delivery expert. Sven features in Parcel2Go’s YouTube videos, radio advertisements, and social media content.
