= Millie's Cookies =

British bakery chain

Millie's Cookies logo

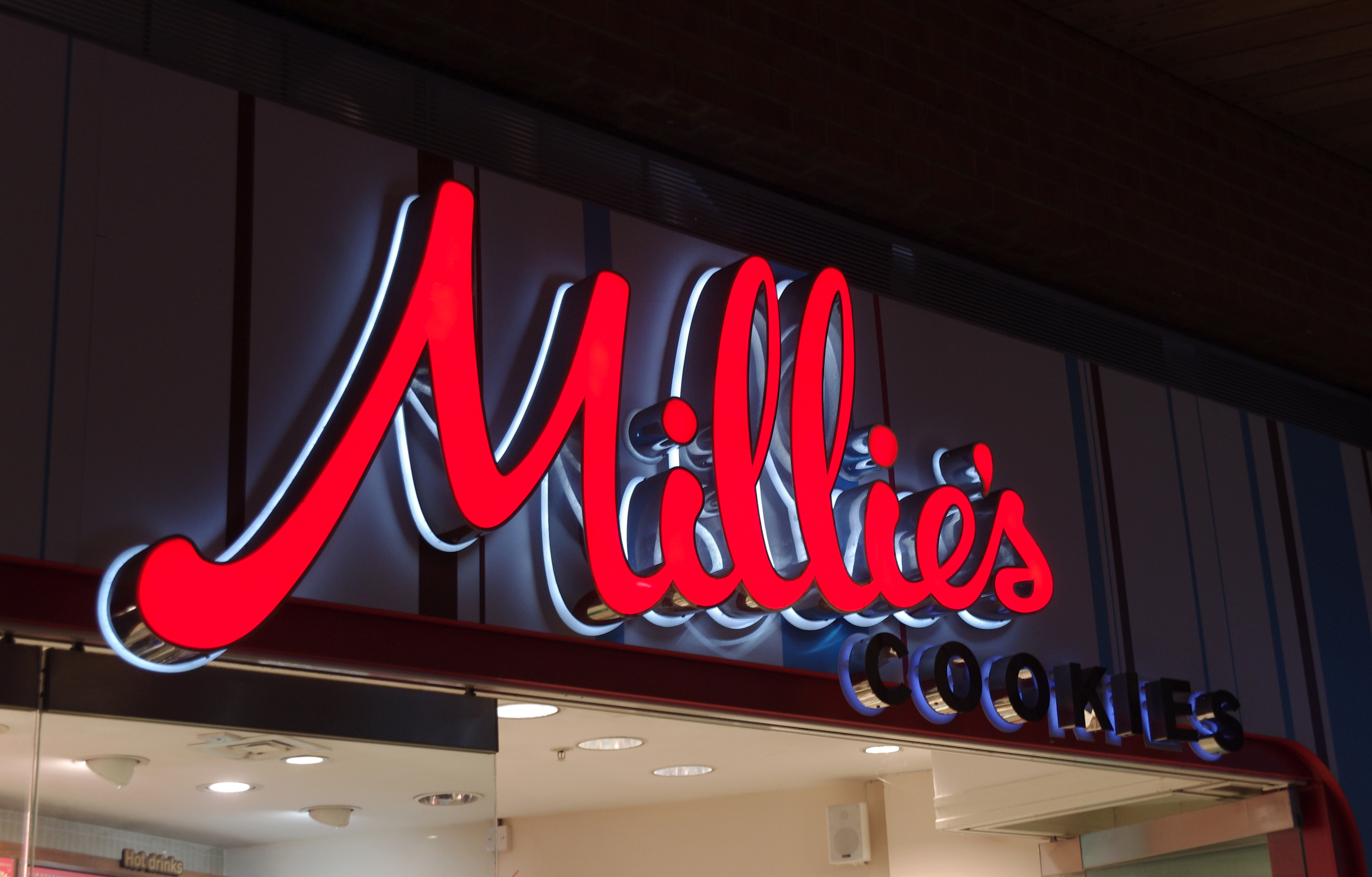
Millies shop sign

Millie's Cookies Limited is a chain of retail bakeries based in the United Kingdom, specializing in cookies, muffins, hot drinks and gifts. It was named after its founder Mario Budwig's grandmother Mildred. The company has stores in the United Kingdom, India, France, Germany, Egypt, Malta, and Hong Kong.

== History ==
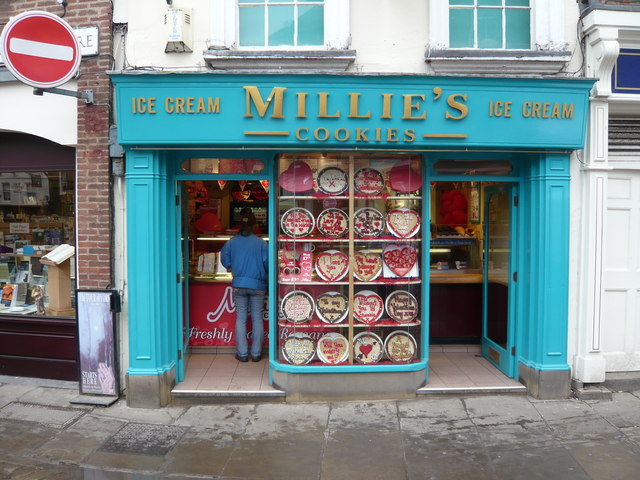
Millies Cookies shop in York in 2011.

The first Millie's Cookie was baked by Stephen Singer after the company was founded by Mario Budwig in the end of 1985. Later that year, the company launched its first store within Selfridges department store food hall on Oxford Street, London. In 1987, Richard O'Sullivan joined the company as managing director and began to expand it outside London for the first time, with openings in Sheffield, Manchester and Birmingham. During the following years, outlets were opened in most major railway stations and airports in the United Kingdom, as well as in many shopping centres.

Business grew steadily, and in June 1997, Millie's Cookies purchased Cookie Jar, a competitor with about thirty outlets. The newly bought stores were rebranded as Millie's Cookies. In June 2003 Millie's was purchased by Select Service Partner (SSP), a division of Compass Group. In April 2006, Compass sold SSP to EQT AB. By 2006, the chain grew to 121 outlets. By 2022, Millie's Cookies' empire had shrunk considerably in size and now only had 45 outlets in the UK although its range was available for home delivery as far as mainland Europe.

It also launched its stores in India with the first one in New Delhi followed by Mumbai, Hyderabad, Bangalore and Surat.

== Stores ==
Millie's currently operates most of its stores in England, mainly in shopping centres, and there are stores in Hong Kong International Airport, France Métro-station Opéra in Paris, Lyon-Saint Exupéry Airport and Berlin Hauptbahnhof. In 2010, outlets opened in Cairo and Malta, the latter a few days after the launch of the Point shopping complex.

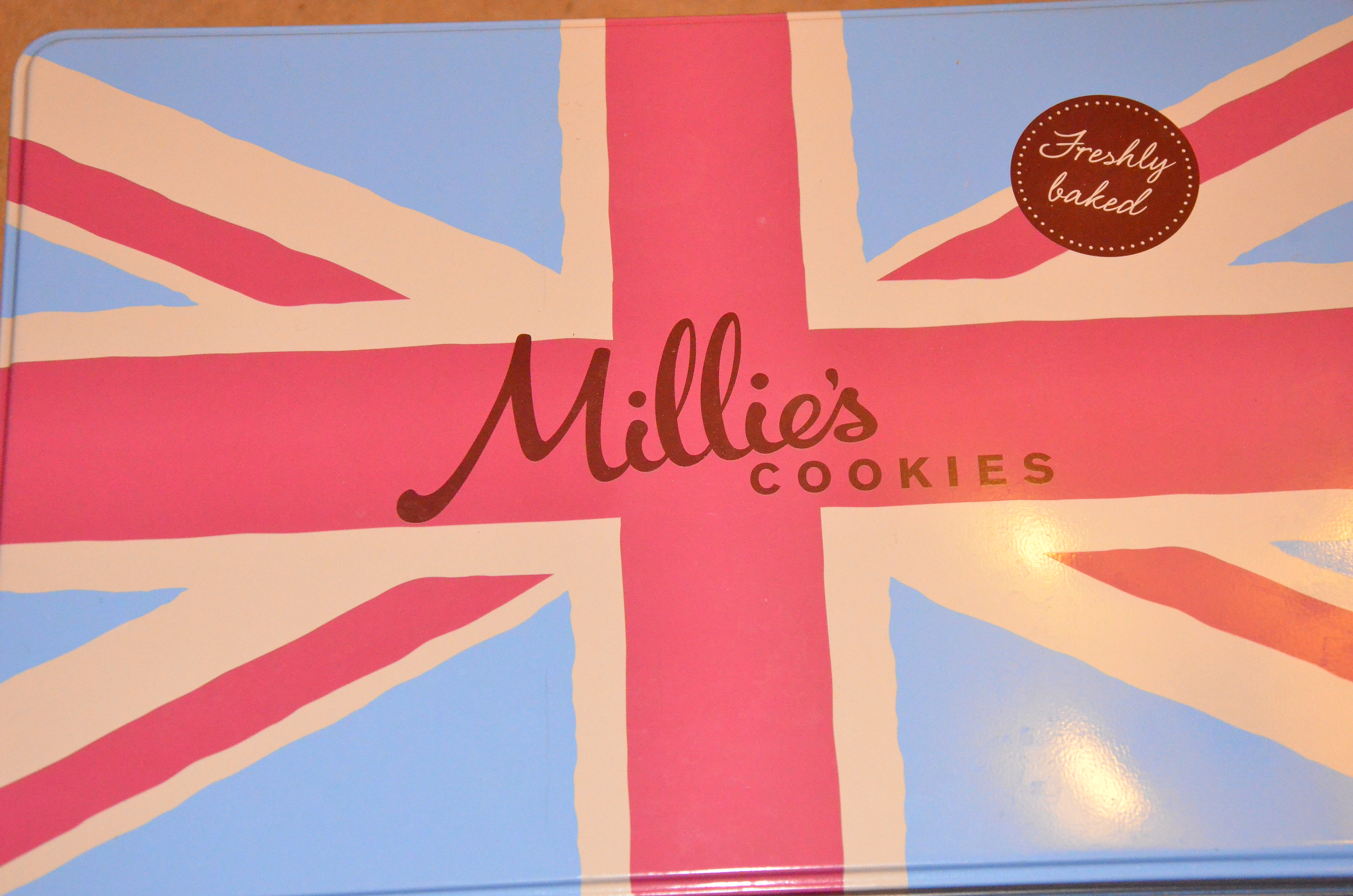
Millies Cookies cake tin
