= Chilango (restaurant chain) =

Restaurant chain in the United Kingdom

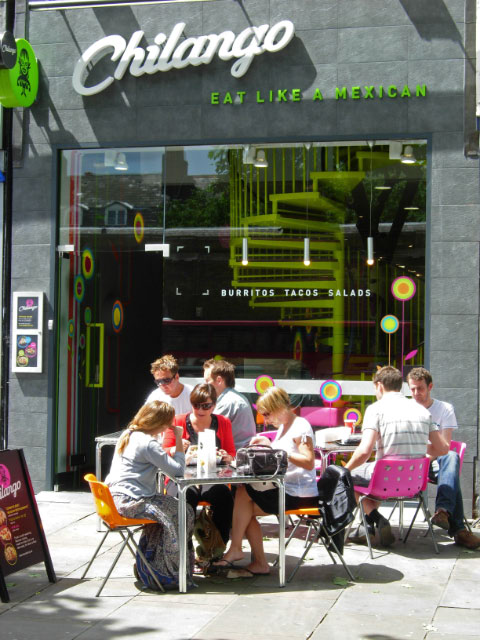
- Company type: Private
- Founded: 2007; 18 years ago
- Headquarters: London, United Kingdom
- Number of locations: 12 branches (2020)
- Area served: London; Manchester; Birmingham
- Website: chilango.co.uk

Chilango is a restaurant chain in the United Kingdom specialising in Mexican cuisine.

== History ==
Chilango was founded in 2007 by Eric Partaker and Dan Houghton, who met whilst working at Skype Technologies.

In August 2014, Chilango raised £2 million through a mini bond issue on crowdfunding platform Crowdcube, styled by the company as 'Burrito bonds'.

In April 2016, Chilango opened its 11th branch and first outside of London, in Manchester. In October 2018, Chilango opened its 12th branch, in Birmingham.

Chilango engaged RSM to "assist on working on long-term planning, options and strategy" in 2019. Chilango entered administration in July 2020. The chain was bought out of administration in August 2020 by the investment group, RD Capital Partners.

In May 2022, it was announced that RD Capital Partners had sold Chilango to the London-based restaurant chain, Tortilla Mexican Grill PLC for £2.8 million.
