= Adzuna =

Worldwide employment-related search engine for job listings

- Type: Private company
- Industry: Internet, Job search engine
- Founded: April 2011
- Founder: Doug Monro and Andrew Hunter
- Headquarters: London, United Kingdom
- Area served: Australia, Austria, Belgium, Brazil, Canada, France, Germany, India, Italy, Mexico, The Netherlands, New Zealand, Poland, Singapore, South Africa, Spain, Switzerland, United Kingdom, United States
- Products: Jobs
- Services: Job search
- Number of employees: c. 100
- Website: adzuna.co.uk

Adzuna is a search engine for job advertisements.

== Product features ==
Like other job search engines, Adzuna gathers and displays vacancies from large job boards, specialized job portals and employer websites into a single database.

In September 2017, Adzuna announced the relaunch of improved 'ValueMyCV'.

In June 2023, Adzuna launched AI interview tool "Prepper" in the US and UK.

In April 2025, Adzuna launched "ApplyIQ", an AI job search agent, in the US and UK.

== History ==
Adzuna was founded in 2011 by Andrew Hunter, former head of marketing of Gumtree and VP of marketing at Qype, and Doug Monro, former MD of Gumtree and COO of Zoopla.

The beta site was launched in April 2011 with £300,000 seed investment from Passion Capital and Angel Investors, followed by a public press launch in July 2011.

In January 2012, Adzuna announced further investment of £500,000 from Index Ventures and The Accelerator Group to expand into other verticals and countries.

In April 2013, Adzuna raised a further £1M from the same investors.

In January 2014, Fairfax Media announced a joint venture with Adzuna in Australia to challenge the job board market leader there, SEEK.

In July 2015, Adzuna raised an additional £2M from over 500 investors via a crowdfunding campaign on Crowdcube.

In May 2018, Adzuna announced a Series C funding round of £8M from Smedvig Capital.

In June 2022, Adzuna announced they had acquired Getwork for an undisclosed amount.

== Other usages ==
The large database of job ads collated by the service has allowed the company to produce a number of statistics about trends in the employment market.

In November 2012, it was reported that Adzuna's job and housing market data was being supplied to the "Number 10 Dashboard", an app built by the UK's Government Digital Service to keep Prime Minister David Cameron and others up to date on key economic indicators.

In 2018, Adzuna was reported to have won a UK government contract to provide the Department for Work and Pensions' Find a Job service.

In 2020, the UK Office for National Statistics started to publish a weekly job vacancy index using Adzuna data.

== Areas served ==
Adzuna operates in the following locations:

| Time | Locations | Reference |
|---|---|---|
| Since April 2011 | United Kingdom | |
| Since April 2013 | Germany; Canada; South Africa; Australia; Brazil | |
| Since January 2014 | France; Netherlands; Poland; Russia (until October 2023); India | |
| Since May 2022 | Switzerland; Belgium; Spain; Mexico | |

== Accolades ==
Adzuna was named by Startups.co.uk as one of the top 20 UK startups of 2011, and by V3 Magazine as one of the top ten up-and-coming UK technology startups of 2013.

In the same year it was also listed by Wired as one of the top 10 startups in London and in 2015 was named to UK government agency Tech City's 'Future Fifty' high growth startups accelerator.

== See also ==
- Employment website
