= Global Travel Taskforce =

UK government body established to consider the safe resumption of international travel

The Global Travel Taskforce is an advisory body of the government of the United Kingdom. Secretary of State for Transport, Grant Shapps announced the formation of the group on 7 October 2020 as a cross-government response to an identified need to enable the safe and sustainable recovery of international travel and to introduce a COVID-19 testing system for travellers visiting the UK. In a Written Statement to Parliament of 7 October 2020, the Transport Secretary pledged to formally report to the Prime Minister by early November 2020 with the taskforce's recommendations as to how the country can help global travel resume safe operation. The Government intends that the work of the taskforce will be performed in collaboration with the transport and tourism industries along with the private sector, specifically in relation to COVID-19 testing.

== Roles ==
1. to consider, timeously, what appropriate steps should be taken by government within the UK and in the international arena to ensure that the operation of international travel returns safely and in a sustainable way;
2. to provide an opportunity for policy-makers to air issues relevant to the facilitation of safer international travel with stakeholders external to government;
3. to consider the implementation of a testing system for international arrivals and how this could advance safe travel to and from the UK;
4. to determine what steps can be taken to boost consumer confidence and remove any obstacles to the safe resumption of international travel;
5. to consider any additional steps to aid the general recovery of international travel, in particular any areas outside a testing regime.

Any ongoing work in relation to travel corridors and related policies is not expected to come under the auspices of the taskforce.

== Membership ==
The taskforce will be jointly chaired by Grant Shapps and Matt Hancock. The group will work with the following government departments and bodies: Department for Transport, Department for Health and Social Care, NHS Test and Trace, Public Health England, Foreign, Commonwealth and Development Office; Department for Digital, Culture, Media and Sport; Department for Business, Energy and Industrial Strategy; Ministry of Housing, Communities and Local Government; HM Treasury; The Home Office; Department for International Trade; and the No 10 / Cabinet Office C–19 Taskforce.

Officials from the nations of the constituent countries of the United Kingdom will also be involved with the work of the taskforce despite the fundamental theme of health being a devolved issue.

== Developments ==
On 11 October 2020, it emerged that the taskforce was exploring ways in which the required period to self-isolate in the UK could be reduced for people arriving from overseas using COVID-19 testing provided by the private sector which would be paid for by the person travelling.

On 14 October, Grant Shapps announced proposals for a testing scheme involving a single COVID-19 test to be performed 7 days after arrival in the UK from a high-risk country. The new testing regime would not negate the need to undergo quarantine for one week after arrival in the United Kingdom. The move would be in keeping with the government's preference for a hybrid solution of lessening the duration required in quarantine with the upscaling of a testing regime within the private sector.

On 16 October, the BBC reported that those returning from travel would have to fund their own private COVID-19 tests in order to prevent NHS capacity from being adversely affected.

According to Ian Taylor writing in Travel Weekly on 21 October 2020, the taskforce met for the first time with leaders from the travel industry.

Charles Hymas writing in The Telegraph on 27 October reported that arrangements for testing prior to departure which would significantly lessen isolation times had already been agreed between airports and airlines but that government authorization following consideration by the government's taskforce was yet to be forthcoming.

On 29 October, it was confirmed that the taskforce would give consideration to the safe return of the UK cruise industry within the context of operations already having been resumed in certain areas of Europe. The Parliamentary Under-Secretary of State for Aviation and Maritime, Robert Courts, said that "different circumstances" applied to the respective countries which had given the go-ahead but that he was "acutely aware" of the significant impact on the cruise sector.

=== Pre-departure COVID testing ===
On 17 November, as part of a trial of COVID testing prior to departure, United Airlines Flight 14 landed at London Heathrow where everyone on board had been mandatorily tested for coronavirus using a NAAT prior to departure at Newark Airport, New York. The flight was part of a pre-departure testing trial involving 12 transatlantic flights scheduled between November and December 2020. A further trial will commence on 25 November involving two British Airways flights (BA268 and BA114) and an American Airlines flight (AA50) from the United States, where passengers will be invited on a voluntary basis to be tested for coronavirus, free of charge, at three days prior to departure and at subsequent points.

The taskforce is reported to be considering how the duration of quarantine can be reduced, however, those travelling as part of the pre-departure testing trials will still be required to self-isolate for the required period of 14 days, even though they had tested negative for COVID-19 before boarding their flight.

== Criticism ==
On Friday, 9 October 2020, just two days after the Global Travel Taskforce was inaugurated, an article in The Times referred to the new body as ″a navel-gazing talking shop″. The article title presented a critical view of the timing of the introduction of the taskforce making it clear that it had arrived too late. The Telegraph also carried an article on 9 October 2020 which levelled criticism at the new taskforce, especially noting the frustration of the beleaguered travel industry.

On 14 October, Simon Calder, Travel Correspondent for The Independent pointed out that the Global Travel Taskforce—the government's answer to demands for airport testing—arrived six months too late. The same day, the Guardian presented a critical view from within the travel industry, when chief executive of ABTA, Mark Tanzer, claimed that the Transport Secretary had not "bat for his sector" and disputed Shapps' claim that the groundwork already done by government could be augmented by the new Global Travel Taskforce.

Giles Hawke, chief executive of Cosmos Tours, writing in the Telegraph on 16 October 2020, made the statement that from the inception of the taskforce on 7 October, he had been unable to identify anyone in the travel industry of an appropriately high position who could confirm that they had been asked to become involved with the taskforce. Hawke added, "anyone in travel could have told Mr Shapps his solution won't work" and that the taskforce "looks set to deliver an unworkable solution".

== Report of the taskforce ==
On 24 November 2020, the taskforce published a report in which 14 recommendations were made. The recommendations fall within three fundamental precepts:

- That journeys will be conducted safely
- That safety will be ensured as the need for travel intensifies
- That the UK should be foremost in the recovery of global travel, underpinned by the advancement of international standards.

The report discussed the stasis of the beleaguered cruise sector and a recommendation was made for the publication of "epidemiological criteria" in relation to the UK before the sector could be restored to safe operation through a "phased restart".

On the same day as the taskforce's publication, The Times reported that a plan outlined as part of the recommendations could see exemptions to the two-week quarantine requirements for those forming part of a tour group or those travelling for business, but that business travellers would be prohibited from mixing with other people in any capacity not directly related to their business trip.

== See also ==
- Economic impact of the COVID-19 pandemic in the United Kingdom (includes transport and aviation)
- Impact of the COVID-19 pandemic on aviation
- The Health Protection (Coronavirus, International Travel) (England) Regulations 2020
- Travel restrictions related to the COVID-19 pandemic
- Vaccine Taskforce (UK)
