= Crowdcube =

Equity crowdfunding platform

- Website type: Crowdfunding Corporate finance Equity (finance)
- Headquarters: Exeter, United Kingdom
- Founders: Darren Westlake and Luke Lang
- Key people: Simon Williams (Chairman); Darren Westlake (CEO)
- Industry: Finance
- Website: crowdcube.com
- Commercial: Yes
- Launched: February 2011; 15 years ago

Crowdcube is a British investment crowdfunding platform, established by Darren Westlake and Luke Lang in 2011.

== Model ==
Equity-based crowdfunding is a new fundraising model for entrepreneurs. Individuals' investments are pooled, allowing entrepreneurs to secure funding directly from the general public and bypass business "angel" investors and banks. The key principle of this model is that anyone can invest money in return for equity in a business. Entrepreneurs, with a UK-registered company, can present their business and its investment potential to potential micro-investors by uploading a Dragons' Den-style video pitch, images, and supporting documents. The minimum investment can be as little as £10.

Crowdcube operates on the "all or nothing" model. When a pitch reaches its investment target, the business receives the funding raised. If it does not, no funds are taken from investors. A commission is charged on successful funding campaigns.

The platform uses social media to a large extent to alert potential investors about an offering. In March 2015, the Financial Conduct Authority released new guidance on the use of social media to promote financial products to ensure that all communications are clear, fair, and not misleading.

Crowdfunding as a model for fundraising has become more popular over the past few years with the rise of the US-based Kickstarter and Indiegogo. These platforms differ from Crowdcube, as they work on a donation and reward-based model where the donor receives a product or service in return for their donation.

On 12 November 2018, Crowdcube introduced a new investor fee that charges investors for investing on the platform, 1.5% of the total investment, added on when the investment is collected. This fee is capped at £250. The fee was met with some backlash within the Crowdcube community, particularly as it was introduced just before Crowdcube's own raise went live and pre-arranged venture capitalists were exempt. It was also criticised for posting the news of the fees within the FAQs, rather than emailing all the investors.

== Regulation ==
In February 2013, Crowdcube received authorisation from the Financial Conduct Authority (FCA) to offer investors the opportunity to become direct legal shareholders in UK businesses.

== Successful exits ==
In July 2015, E-Car Club, an electric vehicle rental business championing the future of the green sharing economy, produced the first exit from the CrowdCube 'Funded Club'. E-Car received a significant investment from Europcar, Europe's largest vehicle rental business. E-Car club has joined the newly formed Europcar Labs project, which has been set up by CEO Philippe Germond to focus on 'mobility solutions'. This is Europcar's first acquisition since its IPO on the Euronext in early June 2015.

In December 2015, it was announced that Camden Town Brewery was being bought by the world's largest brewer, Anheuser-Busch InBev. In a letter to Crowdcube shareholders, AB InBev were offering a payout of between £1.0861 and £1.2526 per share, depending on whether they accept an option with a variable element based on sales growth to be paid at a later date. Reports said this was a nominal return on investment of just under 70%, implying that AB InBev paid around £85 million.

In 2019, Parcel2Go, which had raised funds on Crowdcube in 2017, was subject to a management buyout backed by Mayfair Equity Partners.

== Funded campaigns ==
=== Equity ===
Some examples of companies that have acquired funding using this method are:

Business	Amount raised	No. of investors	Equity released	Date
Freetrade	£8,890,468	7,170	1.353%	November 2021
Cornish Lithium	£5,999,995	1,012	6.81%	June 2021
Sunswap	£501,348	788	21.18%	January 2021
OOONO	£1,520,702	1,697	4.41%	December 2020
Sliabh Liag Distillers	£2,265,910	1,158	13.61%	September 2020
Belluscura	£538,140	302	9.6%	April 2019
Monzo	£20,000,000	36,006	2.04%	December 2018
Recruitive	£1,170,000	381	54.64%	March 2018
Manigo	£510,630	355	14.33%	January 2018
Parcel2Go	£1,057,730	1,308	2.58%	November 2017
Kar-go	£321,720	281	15.11%	July 2017
Revolut	£1,007,050	433	2.39%	September 2016
Movem	£200,000	116	20%	September 2016
GoHenry	£3,994,980	2,372	15.98%	June 2016
Chilango	£3,433,010	1,300	8.72%	December 2015
Adzuna	£2,149,355	552	5.89%	June 2015
JustPark	£3,700,000	2,919	15.61%	March 2015
Open Desk	£310,010	171	18.59%	June 2014
SilkFred	£145,610	71	24.27%	2014
LOVESPACE	£1,574,590	259	28.17%	May 2014
Crowdfunder	£500,000	-	10%	April 2014
Zero Carbon Foods	£659,480	454	29.04%	March 2014
Hab Housing	£1,972,150	642	26.29%	September 2014
E-Car Club	£100,000	63	20%	December 2012

=== Bonds ===
Bonds allow members of the public to lend money to the issuing company in return for interest and/or rewards. Mini-bonds have "particular appeal for established businesses". In June 2014, Chilango launched Crowdcube's first mini-bond campaign. Since then, several other businesses have launched mini-bond offerings via the Crowdcube platform. Some of the businesses that have funded bonds via Crowdcube include:

Company	Amount raised	No. of investors	Interest paid	Date
Brew Dog	£2,312,000	815	6.5%	Oct 2015
Taylor St Baristas	£1,805,000	493	8%	Jan 2015
Eden Project	£1,500,000	355	6%	October 2014
River Cottage	£1,000,000	285	7%	June 2014
Chilango	£2,035,000	347	8%	June 2014

== Events ==
=== Caterham F1 ===
In November 2014, Crowdcube partnered with Caterham F1 to raise £2.35 million to fund the team for the final Grand Prix of the season in Abu Dhabi. Designed to empower F1 fans to help Caterham return to racing, the project was successfully completed on 14 November, with Caterham F1 finishing in 17th place with Grand Prix newcomer Will Stevens. Caterham F1 went bankrupt in 2015.

== See also ==
- Comparison of crowdfunding services
