= Travellers Fare =

Catering company for the British rail network

Travellers Fare was a company owned by British Rail that provided catering services on the rail network in Great Britain.

== History ==
=== Historical background ===
Around 1873 James Joseph Allport, of the Midland Railway took a summer holiday in the US, and experienced dining cars and sleeping cars, so was the first to introduce this to the UK.

The first Pullman ran on Monday June 1 1874 from St Pancras to Bradford. Sleeping cars were also on the East Coast line.

On Saturday November 1 1879, the Pullman Palace Car Company first ran a dining car, on 'Prince of Wales' on the Great Northern Railway, leaving from Leeds Central railway station at 10am, arriving at London King's Cross railway station at 2pm; it returned at 5.30pm, arriving at Leeds at 10pm. On Monday October 27 1879, a test journey had taken place, it had departed from Leeds at 10.30am, taking 3 hours and 50 minutes to London, returning at 9.20pm. The regular service began in February 1880.

The least innovative company was the London and North Western Railway, who were reluctant to introduce dining cars, but added them to Manchester and Liverpool, and to Scotland around 1891. In 1890 the Great Eastern Railway introduced dining cars, and to second class as well; it also provided food for third class, to Harwich. The Midland Railway introduced third class catering on July 2 1894. The first buffet car was in 1899 on the Great Central Railway.

Dining cars stopped in September 1939, and restarted in October 1945, but food was heavily rationed until 1954.

=== Conglomeration ===
Prior to 1973, railway hotels and catering came under British Transport Hotels (BTH), formed in 1962. In the late 1970s, BR's Shipping and International Services Division became Sealink from January 1979. In 1982 Travellers Fare formally left BTH, having been the Travellers Fare Division of BTH since 1 October 1973. It had been known as British Rail Catering until then. The peak of British rail catering had come in 1973 when 3.5 million meals were served. Quicker journey times meant less time to consume a full meal. In 1979 it celebrated a centenary of railway catering.

In the mid-1970s they were selling around two and a quarter million sandwiches a year. In 1977 its offerings were reprimanded by the Central Transport Consultative Committee, and that same year Prue Leith, a restaurateur and caterer, became the first woman appointed to the British Railways Board, charged with improving its much-criticised catering. In February 1978 they introduced the Gold Star Menu for businessmen on InterCity services, which featured poached haddock and grilled salmon maître d'hôtel. It offered a fixed four-course meal for around £5, and replaced the former table d'hôte service. The Great British Breakfast in the morning sold for £2.70 in 1978, and by 1984 it cost £7.30.

=== Improvements ===
Microwave ovens appeared with the HST, introduced to much passenger acclaim in the late 1970s.

In 1977 Euston turned over £2m, which was the most. KX and St Pancras took over £1m. Prices dropped on Monday October 30 1978. In 1978, 915,500 breakfasts were served in dining cars, and 440,000 dinners. In the buffet cars, 15m customers bought 8m coffees, 5m teas, 2.8m sandwiches, and 7.5m cans of beer. The company turned over £21m.

In 1979, on each weekday, there were restaurant cars on 500 services, and buffet cars on 1,000 services, which was the biggest train catering operation in the world, with 2,000 staff on train catering, with around 250 women. Menus were collated at St Pancras. Breakfast was £2.25, continental breakfast was £1.15, and Morning Break was 80p.

=== Restrictions on alcohol ===
In August 1980 alcohol was banned on football trains, it was due to trouble by Scottish fans in May 1980 after the England-Scotland game, when a passenger was stabbed and killed. 450 fans were arrested. The National Football Intelligence Unit was formed in March 1990.

=== Innovations ===
In the early 1980s, under improved management, the standard of food became more diverse. New brands were introduced such as Quicksnack.

The wider aisle of the Mark 3 carriage allowed the catering trolley, from 1984, which was resisted by the NUR at first. At Cannon Street station, a steward took his trolley off the train, and sold intoxicating liquor to waiting passengers, but the zealous station manager reported this to the BTP, as you needed an alcohol licence to sell in a station, but not on a train.

In conjunction with THF, the WCML started cook-chill meals, called 'Cuisine 2000' in 1985. Fifty Mark 3 carriages were converted for these meals, but THF found it difficult to adequately supply sufficient food over a 400-mile line, so it never continued.

Turnover at stations increased 61% from £46m in 1982 to £74m in 1987. Before 1985 operating losses at stations were averaging around £4m a year, which from 1985 became surpluses. Although the station catering was turning a profit, the catering on board the trains was not, and operating losses for these were around £6m a year in the mid-1980s. In May 1986, catering on-board trains became the responsibility of InterCity and not Travellers Fare, which had a wider range of food from the buffet car.

The brand did not have enough penetration to sell on the trains; its on-board full (cooked) breakfasts had a lot of popularity nonetheless (around 500,000 a year in the 1980s) in the dining car (first class).

=== Private ownership ===
By 1986 the private sector was running the catering at 85 stations, which led to 96 more stations being put under private operation in 1987.

As a precursor to the privatisation of British Rail, the company was sold to a management buyout team backed by 3i in December 1988. It had been bought for £12.5m, and had 270 outlets and around 3,200 employees.

It was subsequently acquired in November 1992 by Compass Group for £31.7m, who merged it with its airport, retail and leisure businesses to form Select Service Partner (SSP) in 1997. It stopped trading as Travellers Fare on 4 March 1997. Compass sold SSP to a consortium led by EQT and Macquarie Bank in 2006 for £1.8 billion.
