= British Retail Consortium =

Trade association in the United Kingdom

- Abbreviation: BRC
- Formation: 1946; 80 years ago
- Merger of: British Retailers' Association, Retail Consortium
- Legal status: Not for profit company
- Purpose: To make a positive difference to the retail industry and the customers it serves
- Location: London, UK
- Region served: UK
- Members: 200 retailers
- Chief Executive: Helen Dickinson OBE
- Website: www.brc.org.uk

The British Retail Consortium (BRC) is a trade association for retail businesses in the United Kingdom.

== History ==
The British Retail Consortium was formed in January 1992 with the merger of the British Retailers' Association and the Retail Consortium. In 1998, it produced the first edition of the BRC Food Technical Standard and Protocol for food suppliers, which has been widely adopted.

BRC went on to produce other global standards, which became a separate brand and were sold to the LGC Group in 2016.

== Functions ==
It campaigns for the retail industry and act as a voice for retail companies. It campaigns and influences the government and acts as a provider of retail information. The BRC works with its members to shape debates and influence issues and opportunities.

=== Campaigns ===
The BRC has backed a Private Members’ Bill that aims to protect shop workers and deter criminals by introducing stronger criminal penalties for offenders attacking shop workers and reviewing the sentencing guidelines for assault.
