= Helen Dickinson =

British accountant and business executive (born 1966)

Helen Dickinson OBE

Chief executive officer of the British Retail Consortium
- Incumbent
- Assumed office January 2013
- Preceded by: Stephen Robertson

Personal details
- Born: 1966 (age 59–60) Surrey, England
- Education: Kingston Polytechnic
- Profession: Accountant

Helen Dickinson OBE (born 1966, Surrey, England) is a British accountant and executive, and the current chief executive officer (CEO) of the British Retail Consortium, a post she has held since January 2013. Before joining the British Retail Consortium, she had previously worked as an auditor for accounts firm KPMG, working with retailers.

Born in Surrey, England in 1966, Dickinson was educated at schools in New Zealand and The Kings School, Ottery St Mary, Devon before attending Kingston Polytechnic. Her first job was as a sales assistant at a high street chemist. After joining KPMG she rose to the position of head of retail. In 2012 she was appointed to succeed Stephen Robertson in the role of what was then known as the Director-General of the British Retail Consortium, and took up the post in January 2013. For her services to the retail industry, Dickinson was appointed an OBE in the 2016 New Year's Honours.

As CEO of the British Retail Consortium, Dickinson was one of the people to attend government briefings during the COVID-19 pandemic, where she urged people to shop responsibly after panic buying led to a shortage of food in supermarkets.

She is a regular voice for the UK retail industry, and has contributed articles to magazines such as Retail Week.
