= Tortilla (restaurant chain) =

British fast food chain

Tortilla Mexican Grill PLC

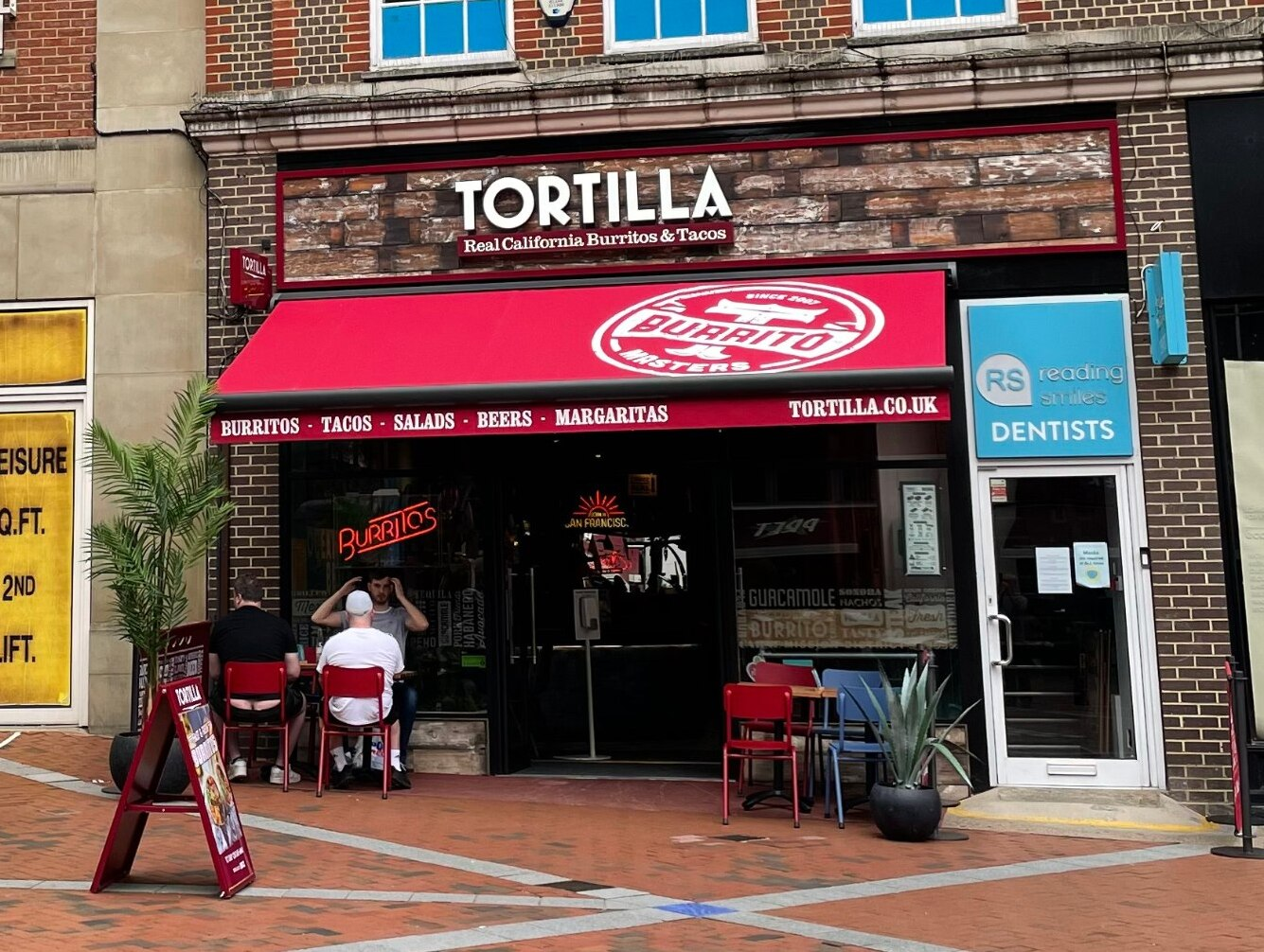
- Branch in Reading, Berkshire
- Company type: Public limited company
- Traded as: LSE: MEX
- Founded: 2007
- Headquarters: London, England, UK
- Number of locations: 53
- Area served: United Kingdom, UAE, Saudi Arabia
- Key people: Brandon Stephens, Jennifer Stephens (founders), Andrew Naylor (CEO), Maria Denny (CFO)
- Products: Mexican
- Website: www.tortilla.co.uk

Tortilla Mexican Grill PLC (branded as Tortilla) is a fast-food restaurant based in the United Kingdom, founded in 2007 by Brandon and Jennifer Stephens.

As of October 2022, it has 84 branches in the UK. Internationally, Tortilla operates in the Middle East, with 10 stores in Dubai and Saudi Arabia through a franchise partnership with Eathos.

== History ==
The first Tortilla restaurant opened in Islington in 2007, becoming the UK’s largest fast-food Mexican brand. Tortilla offers dine-in, self-serve, take away, click and collect, and delivery.

Tortilla's growth was supported by a steady expansion across the UK, including 10 sites in Dubai and Saudi Arabia, a cloud kitchen estate and exclusive delivery partnership with Deliveroo.

In 2019, Tortilla expanded its footprint to include some of the UK’s most prominent travel hubs, including the Euston railway station, through a partnership with SSP Group. In October 2021, Tortilla announced the launch of two new sites in Gatwick Airport and Leeds Skelton Lake Services.

In May 2021, Tortilla opened a site in Chessington World of Adventures Resort, through a partnership with Merlin Entertainments.

Over the years, Tortilla won several industry awards, including:

- QSR Media UK Centegra Awards 2020 - Best Marketing Campaign
- Restaurant Marketer & Innovator 2020 - 30 under 30
- R200: Best Value Restaurant Chain Over 20 Sites 2018
- FEJ Awards 2018 Operator of the year, best new kitchen concept

In May 2022, Tortilla announced it has acquired the Mexican restaurant chain Chilango Ltd from the investment company RDCP Group Ltd., for £2.8 million.

== Values ==
The brand only uses grass-fed British Isle brisket in its slow-cooked Barbacoa, as well as Red Tractor approved pork, and is a signatory of the Better Chicken Commitment. Meanwhile all vegetarian and vegan dishes are Vegan & Vegetarian Society approved.

In January 2021, to aid youth employment, Tortilla has offered 50 new placements as part of the Government’s Kickstart Scheme.
