= The 2.6 Challenge =

British charity aid campaign

The 2.6 Challenge was launched in response to the COVID-19 pandemic in the United Kingdom to help replace lost income in the charitable sector. A major concern was the cancellation of the London Marathon which had raised over £60m in 2019. The marathon was originally scheduled for 26 April, so the challenge encouraged people to take part in fundraising events based on the number 2.6.

The event was supported by the Charities Aid Foundation, the Institute of Fundraising, the Small Charities Coalition, the Office for Civil Society, Sport England, Sport Wales, Virgin Money Giving, Let's Do This, and Just Giving. The challenge, which required participants to complete activities themed around the numbers 2 and 6, began on 26 April - the original date of the London Marathon. Organisers aimed to raise £67 million.

As of 25 May 2020 it had raised £10.7 million.

== See also ==
- Captain Tom
