= Pumpkin, Georgia =

Unincorporated community in the US state of Georgia

Coordinates: 33°55′43″N 84°53′43″W

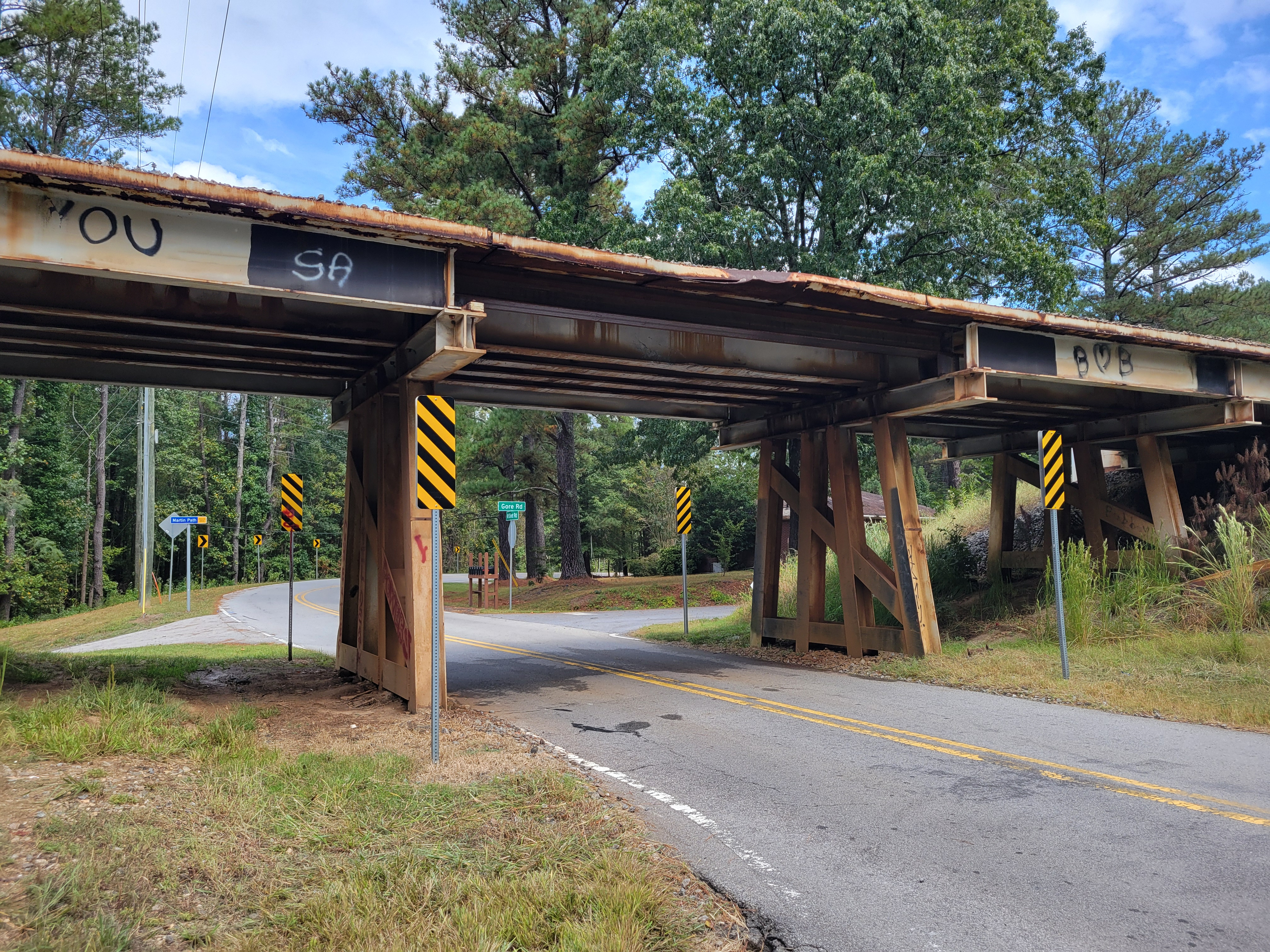
Railroad bridge over Mount Olivet Road

Pumpkin is an unincorporated community in Paulding County, in the U.S. state of Georgia.

== History ==
Pumpkin takes its name from nearby Pumpkinvine Creek. A post office called Pumpkin was established in 1880, and remained in operation until 1891.
