= JustPark =

Parking technology platform

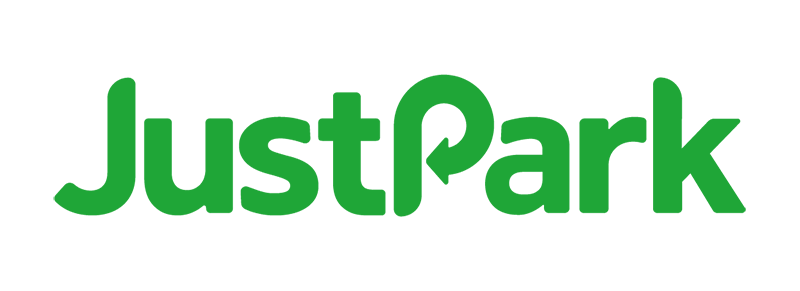
- Type: Private
- Industry: Property, Transportation, Technology
- Founded: 2006; 20 years ago
- Founder: Anthony Eskinazi
- Headquarters: Dunn's Hat Factory, 106-110 Kentish Town Rd, London NW1 9PX, London, United Kingdom
- Area served: Global
- Key people: Anthony Eskinazi
- Brands: JustPark, ParkatmyHouse, ChargeatmyHouse
- Number of employees: 95
- Website: www.justpark.com

JustPark is a technology platform that matches drivers with parking spaces through its website and mobile application. JustPark, previously known as ParkatmyHouse, was founded in London in 2006 by Anthony Eskinazi.

As of 2013, the JustPark service was used by over 2.5 million drivers with 45,000 space owners across the UK. The company became the number one in the App Store and Play Store for the search term 'parking' in 2018.

JustPark is headquartered in London.

== History ==
JustPark, originally known as ParkatmyHouse, was founded by Anthony Eskinazi in September 2006 after he had trouble parking for a baseball game in San Francisco. In July 2011, the company raised venture capital from BMW i Ventures, the venture capital arm of BMW.

In January 2012, they launched a beta version of their website in the US.

In 2014, the company rebranded as JustPark raising further funding from Index Ventures in December of that year. JustPark was named by Management Today as one of the "Five British startups that came of age in 2014", alongside Just Eat, TransferWise, Funding Circle and CrowdCube.

In February 2015, JustPark launched an equity crowdfunding campaign to raise £1 million on major UK platform, CrowdCube. The campaign hit its target in four days, attracting a record-breaking number of investors, before overfunding to a total of £3.7m. In the same year, the company won Virgin Media Business's 'Pitch To Rich' (or '#VOOM') competition, with Sir Richard Branson on the judging panel.

In November 2015, Anthony Eskinazi took over as CEO from Alex Stephany who had been in position since December 2012.

In 2017, JustPark won the Parking Futures category at the British Parking Awards and the Guardian Small Business Showcase Award for Innovation in Funding.

In 2018, JustPark won the British Parking Award for Innovation for its Predictive Availability tool.

== Business growth ==
The business started as a platform to allow property owners to make money from their underused spaces by opening them up to drivers looking for parking (similar to other sharing economy services, such as Airbnb).

Today JustPark is a platform for drivers to find, book and pay for parking via a 5-star rated app or through the website but the company has expanded to provide more than a simple peer-to-peer service.

JustPark's developments in cashless payment technology and digital pay-on-foot machines have allowed the company to enter the local authority parking market securing contracts as the mobile payments provider for Wrexham County Borough Council and Cornwall Council. As of 2018, JustPark partners with 14 local authorities.

The company also provides car park technology to over 300 hotels including Marriott and Hilton as well as to businesses in the property sectors including Savills and JLL.
