= Upper Crust (restaurant chain) =

Chain of baguette restaurants

- Type: Wholly owned subsidiary
- Industry: Food and drink
- Founded: 1986; 40 years ago in London Waterloo Station
- Number of locations: 100 (2019)
- Area served: United Kingdom, Norway, Sweden, Finland, Spain, Egypt, Republic of Ireland
- Products: Baguettes, coffee, sandwiches
- Parent: SSP Group
- Website: uppercrust-baguettes.com

Upper Crust is an international chain of baguette restaurants concentrated along commuter routes. The outlets are commonplace in stations and terminals.

There are branches at the central railway station in Oslo and Elkjøp Megastore Lørenskog, Norway. Since September 2008, there are also three units in Stockholm, Sweden – two at the central railway station and one at the nearby bus terminal, Cityterminalen. There is also one in the Gothenburg Central Station, and one in Euston Station, London.

The company has started to expand into shopping centres, with a new store at Bridgend Designer Outlet, South Wales. There are also branches in airports, including Cairo Airport, Tromsø Airport, Trondheim Værnes Airport, Oslo Airport Gardermoen, Helsinki Airport, Toronto Airport, Sofia Vasil Levski Airport, George Bush Intercontinental Airport and Gran Canaria Airport. They were located in Australia too in the past, at places such as Circular Quay.

== History ==
The first Upper Crust opened in 1986 by Travellers Fare, the catering division of British Rail, in London Waterloo Station. The chain is now owned by SSP.

During the COVID-19 pandemic in the United Kingdom, SSP announced it was cutting 5,000 UK jobs across its chains, including Upper Crust and Caffè Ritazza, as part of a restructuring aimed at keeping the company afloat.

== Products ==
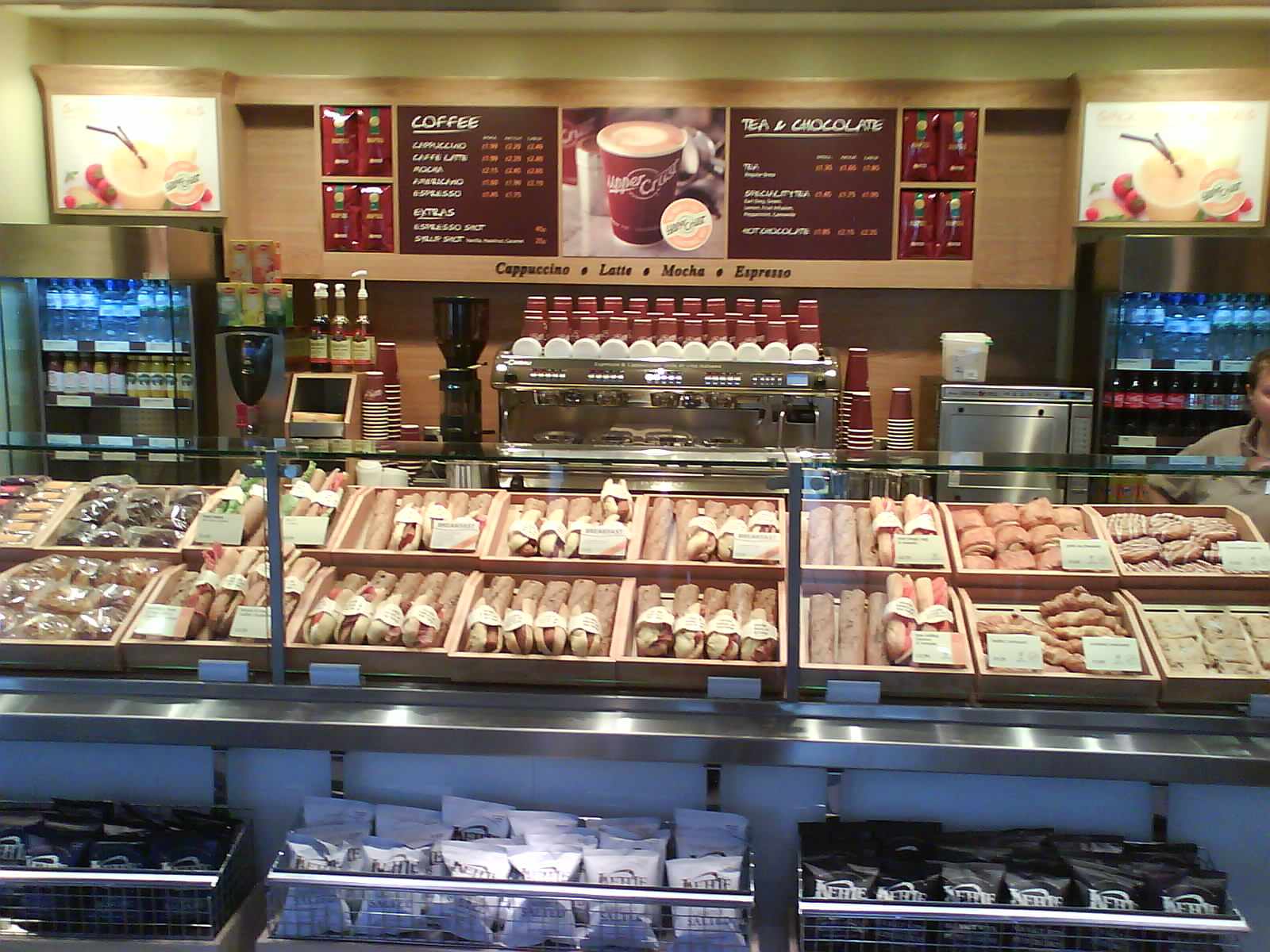
Upper Crust in Bridgend Designer Outlet.

Upper Crust specialises in baguettes. Some of the main fillings include: Breakfast baguettes, Ham and Cheddar, Ham and Mozzarella, Cheddar and Bacon, Tuna Mayo, BLT, Cheese and Tomato and Egg and Tomato. Cakes and pastries are available throughout the day and include various muffins, danishes, scones, brownies and flapjacks.

The chain offers a number of hot and cold drinks, including coffees (Americano, latte, cappuccino, mocha, espresso), teas (Earl Grey, lemon, green, peppermint, fruit infusion), hot chocolate, carbonated drinks (Coke, Diet Coke, Sprite, Fanta, Red Bull), still and sparkling waters, Innocent smoothies, orange and apple juices and Feel Good juices.

Some branches also make their own smoothies in store.

== Sustainability ==
In a survey of fish sandwiches sold in London outlets (published January 2011) by The Jellied Eel ethical food magazine, Upper Crust received a "poor" rating for the sustainability of the fish in their sandwiches and the information about provenance and sustainability of fish ingredients provided by staff, in store and on the sandwich labelling.

== See also ==
- List of bakery cafés
