= SSP Group =

British foodservice company

SSP Group plc
- Type: Public
- Traded as: LSE: SSPG; FTSE 250 Component
- Industry: Foodservice
- Founded: 1961
- Headquarters: London, England, UK
- Area served: Worldwide
- Key people: Mike Clasper, Chairman; Patrick Coveney, Chief Executive
- Products: Restaurants, Cafes, Bars, Fast Food
- Services: Foodservice
- Revenue: ▲£3,638.5 million (2025)
- Operating income: ▲£269.1 million (2025)
- Net income: ▼£(24.0) million (2025)
- Number of employees: 42,488 (2025)
- Website: www.foodtravelexperts.com

SSP is an operator of food and beverage outlets in travel locations. The company, headquartered in London, England, is listed on the London Stock Exchange and is a constituent of the FTSE 250 Index.

== History ==
=== SAS Catering ===
The business was established as a division of Scandinavian airline SAS Group under the name of SAS Catering in 1961.

SAS Catering and Hotels was a separate division of SAS. The company operated a restaurant at Manchester Airport from December 1982, which was later known as the £225,000 'Lancaster Bar and Restaurant'.

=== Scandinavian Service Partner ===
The Select Service Partner (SSP) division of SAS was acquired by Compass Group in May 1993 for £72 million, where the company became Scandinavian Service Partner, run by Borge Ruby, and was Europe’s largest airport restaurant operator.

=== Select Service Partner ===
Compass merged SSP with several other companies it owned, including Travellers Fare, British Rail's former catering division which had been privatised under a management buy-out in 1988 before being bought by Compass in 1992. In 2006 the business was bought by EQT AB for £1.822 billion. The company was the subject of an initial public offering in 2014.

In 2023, SSP announced its entry to the Italian and Icelandic market. The company also announced its expansion in North America with the acquisition of the concessions business of Midfield Concession Enterprises Inc. (“MCE”) and, later in 2023, the acquisition of the Calgary-based business ECG Ventures Limited.

In 2024, SSP entered into an agreement to acquire 100% of the shares of Airport Retail Enterprises Pty Ltd (“ARE”) in Australia.

== Operations ==
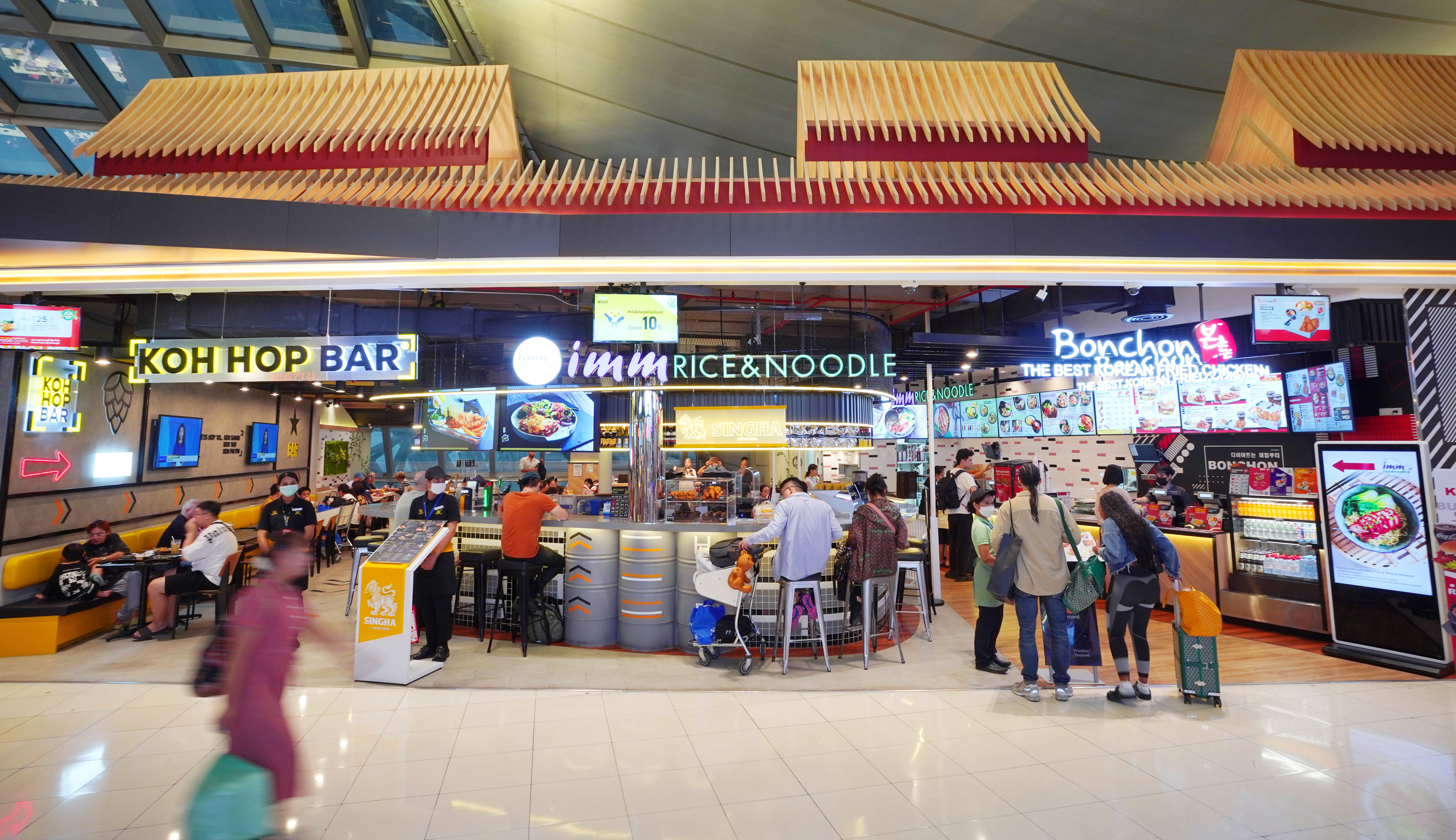
SSP units at Suvarnabhumi Airport in Bangkok, Thailand

SSP has a portfolio of brands, including its own and those it franchises. Brands range from well-known grab ‘n’ go sandwich shops and cafés to casual dining restaurants and bespoke high-end concepts. SSP operates international brands, national brands and local heroes, which are prominent brands in specific markets, as well as brands and concepts it has created. Some examples are:

=== Own brand ===
- Le Grand Comptoir
- Upper Crust
- Caffè Ritazza
- Le Train Bleu
- UrbanCrave
- Millie's Cookies
- Nippon Ramen
- Shelby&Co Bar and Restaurant
- Soul + Grain

=== Franchise partners ===
- Starbucks
- Burger King
- YO! Sushi
- Marks & Spencer
- Tortilla
- SPAR
- Leon Restaurants
- Bottega
- Greggs
