= Caffè Ritazza =

Coffee shop chain

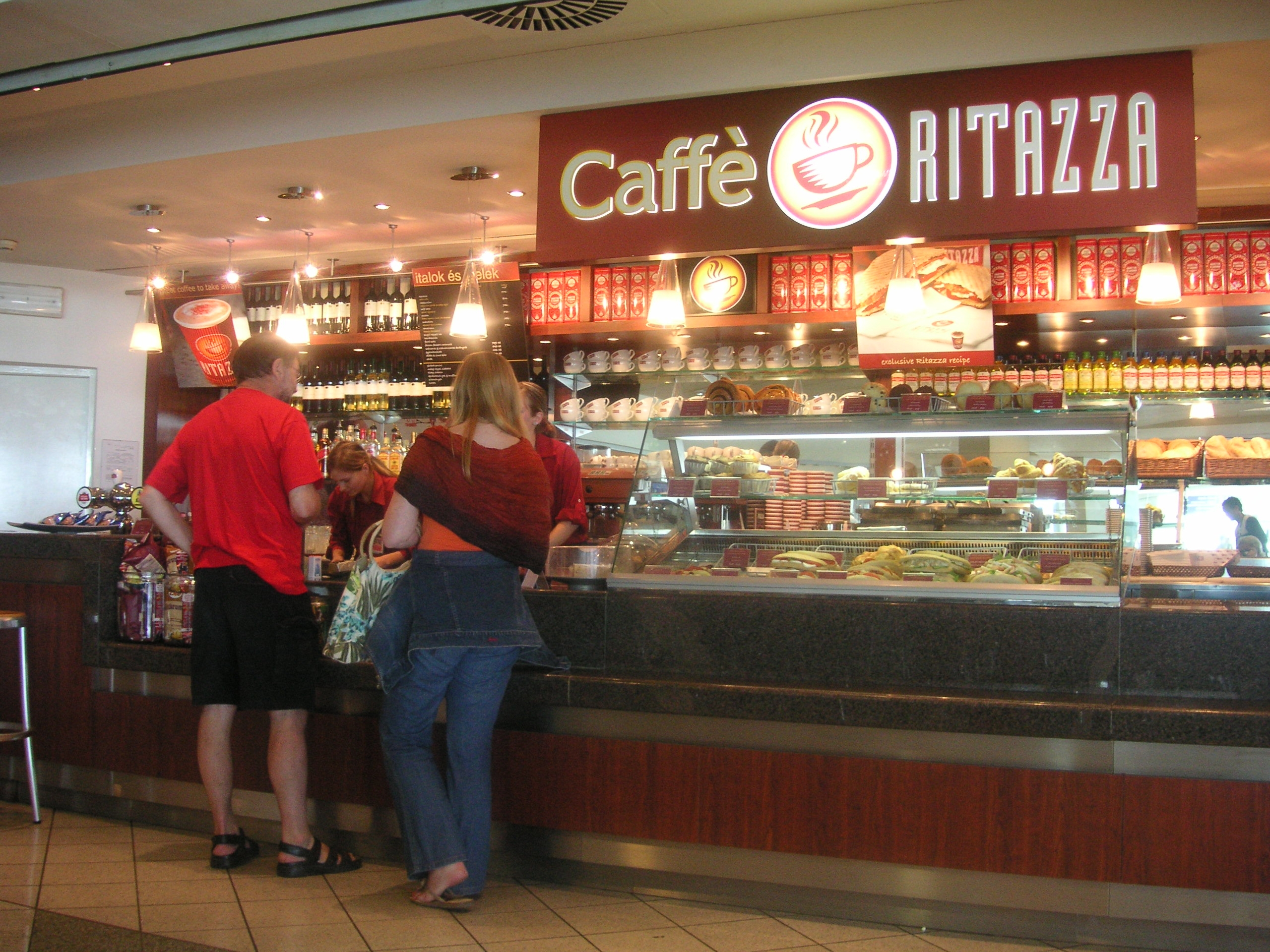
A Caffè Ritazza at Budapest Ferihegy International Airport

Caffè Ritazza is a chain of coffee shops owned by the British multinational company SSP Group. It provides a range of coffees, pastries, ciabattas, panini and alcoholic drinks at many sites internationally.

The brand was developed specifically for the travel market.

During the COVID-19 pandemic in the United Kingdom, SSP announced it was cutting 5,000 UK jobs across its chains, including Caffè Ritazza, as part of a restructuring aimed at keeping the company afloat.

== Locations ==
There are 119 outlets across 21 countries. Four blends are offered by the café chain: Sorrento, Firenze, Napoli, and Capri.

Caffè Ritazza outlets, some of which are operated by Compass Group, are based mainly in the transport sector, airports, railway stations. Around the world, Caffè Ritazza outlets can also be found at university campuses, hospitals, airports and Asda Living stores.

== See also ==
- List of coffeehouse chains
