= Climate change in the United Kingdom =

Emissions, effects, and responses of the United Kingdom related to climate change

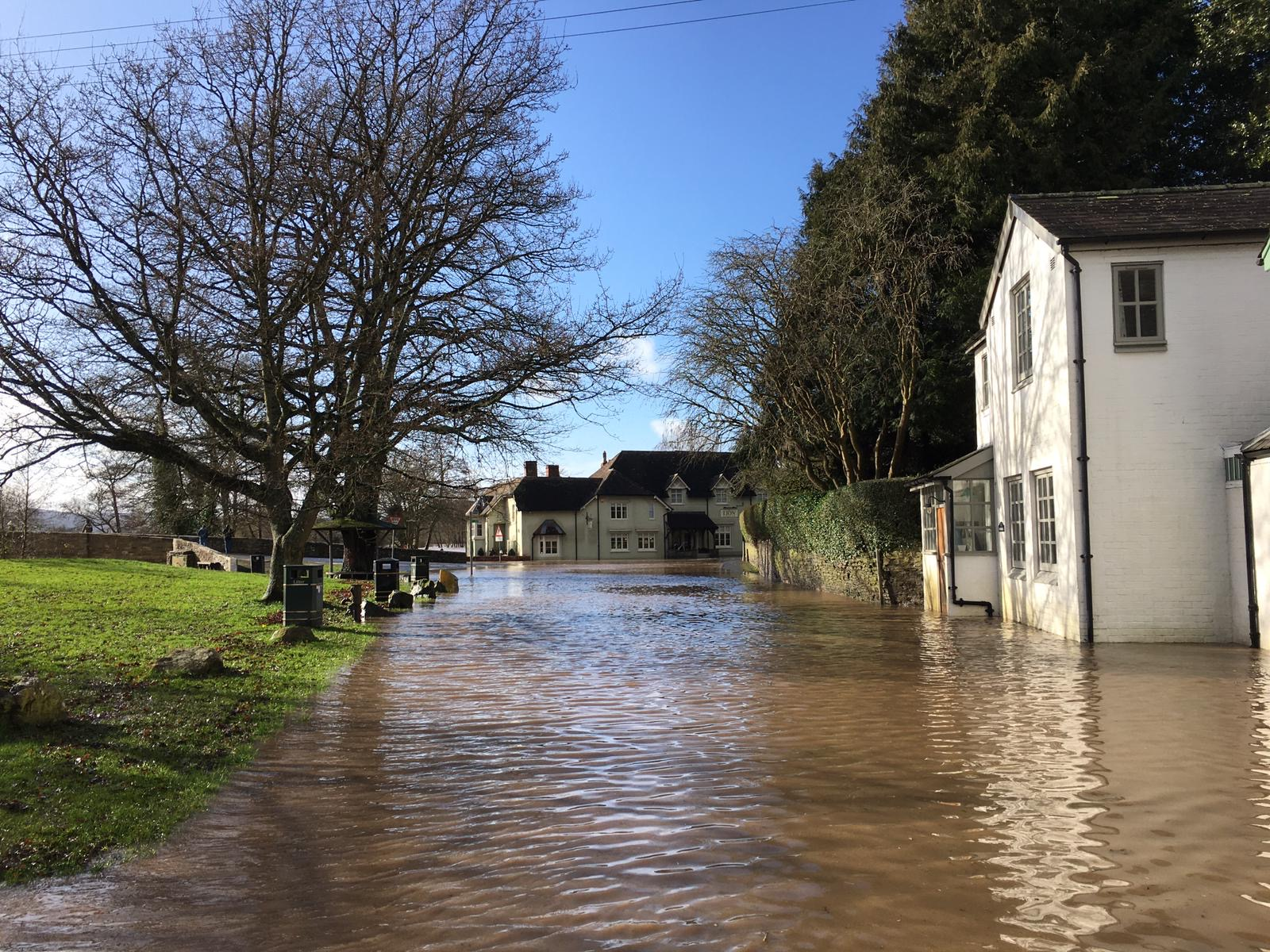
Climate change has increased the risk of flooding, as with Storm Dennis.

The United Kingdom's climate is changing, with hotter drier summers and warmer wetter winters. Storms, floods, droughts and heatwaves are becoming more frequent and intense, and sea level rise is affecting coastal areas. The UK is also a contributor to climate change, having emitted more greenhouse gas per person than the world average. Climate change is having economic effects on the UK and presents risks to human health and ecosystems.

The UK has more than halved its greenhouse gas emissions since 1990, and under the Paris Agreement has committed to net zero emissions by 2050, via a series of carbon budgets. Parliament passed Acts related to climate change in 2006 and 2008, the latter being the first time a government legally mandated a reduction in greenhouse gas emissions. The UK Climate Change Programme was established in 2000 and the Climate Change Committee provides policy advice towards mitigation targets. In 2019, Parliament declared a 'climate change emergency'. The country phased out coal power in 2024. The UK has been prominent in international cooperation on climate change, including through UN conferences and during its European Union membership.

Climate change has been discussed by British politicians since the late 20th century, but it has attracted greater political, public and media attention in the UK from the 2000s, with the commitment to net zero now opposed by some political parties. Public opinion polls show concern amongst the majority of Britons. Various climate change activism initiatives have taken place in the UK.

== Greenhouse gas emissions ==
Development of carbon dioxide emissions, 1750 to 2023

In 2021, net greenhouse gas (GHG) emissions in the United Kingdom (UK) were 427 million tonnes (Mt) carbon dioxide equivalent (CO_{2}e), 80% of which was carbon dioxide (CO_{2}) itself. Emissions increased by 5% in 2021 with the easing of COVID-19 restrictions, primarily due to the extra road transport. The UK has over time emitted about 3% of the world total human-caused CO_{2}, with a current rate under 1%, although the population is less than 1%.

Emissions decreased in the 2010s due to the closure of almost all coal-fired power stations. In 2020 emissions per person were somewhat over 6 tonnes when measured by the international standard production based greenhouse gas inventory, near the global average. But consumption based emissions include GHG due to imports and aviation so are much larger, about 10 tonnes per person per year.

The UK has committed to net zero by 2050. The target for 2030 is a 68% reduction compared with 1990 levels. The UK has been successful in keeping its economic growth alongside taking climate change action. Since 1990, the UK's greenhouse gas emissions have been reduced by 50% while the economy has grown by around 79% up until 2022. One of the methods of reducing emissions is the UK Emissions Trading Scheme.

Meeting future carbon budgets will require reducing emissions by at least 3% a year. At the 2021 United Nations Climate Change Conference the Prime Minister said the government would not be "lagging on lagging", but in 2022 the opposition said Britain was badly behind in such home insulation. The Committee on Climate Change, an independent body which advises the UK and devolved government, has recommended hundreds of actions to the government, including better energy efficiency, such as in housing. In a 2024 report to parliament, the Climate Change Committee stated that only a third of the emissions reductions necessary to meet their 2030 target (68% of 1990 emission levels) were covered by credible plans.

== Effects on the natural environment ==
=== Temperature and weather changes ===
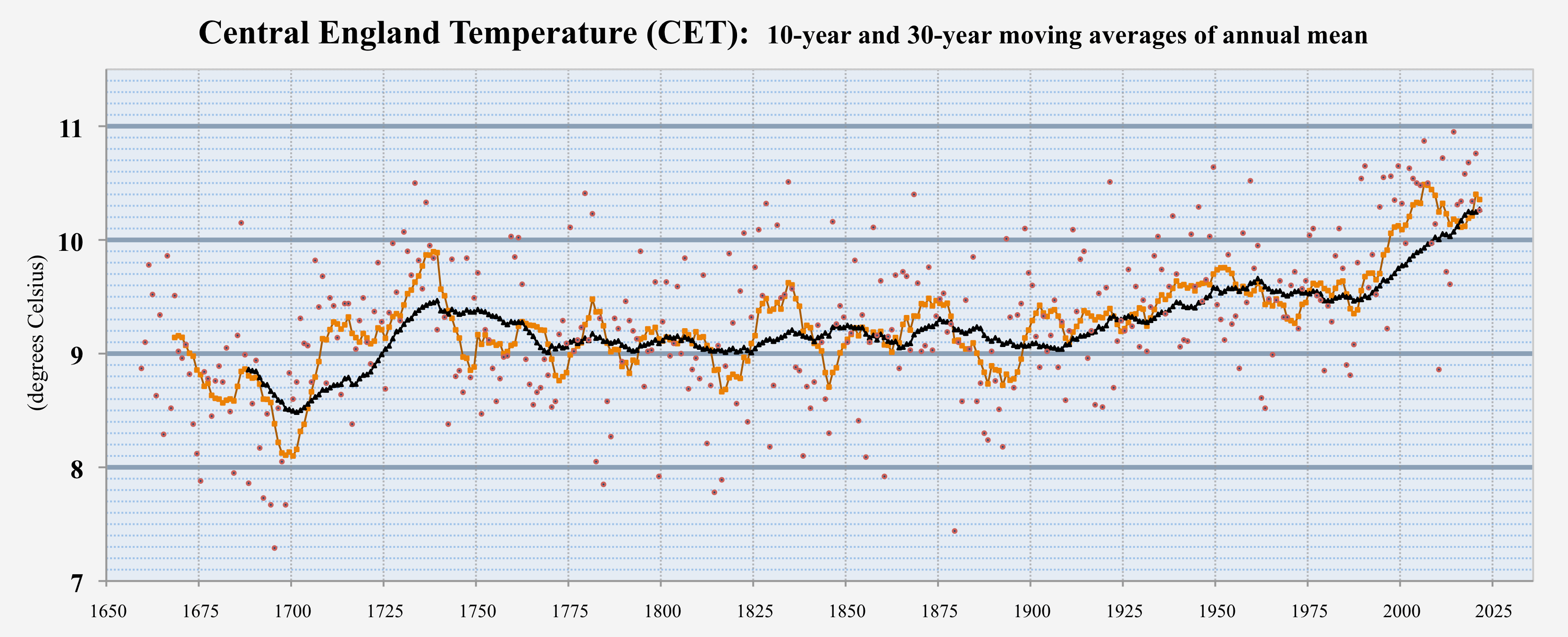
Central England temperature dataset, 1659 to 2019.

Köppen climate classification map for Great Britain and Northern Ireland for 1980–2016

2071–2100 map under the most intense climate change scenario. Mid-range scenarios are currently considered more likely

The Central England temperature series, recorded since 1659 in the Midlands, shows an observed increase in temperature, consistent with anthropogenic climate change rather than natural climate variability and change. According to the Met Office, climate change will affect the climate of the United Kingdom with warmer and wetter winters and hotter and drier summers. Spanish plumes will continue but bring more intense weather conditions such as hotter summer weather and summer thunderstorms.

By 2014, the United Kingdom's seven warmest and 4 out of its 5 wettest years had occurred between the years of 2000–2014. Higher temperatures increase evaporation and consequently rainfall. In 2014, England recorded its wettest winter in over 250 years with widespread flooding.

In parts of the south east of the UK, the temperature in the hottest days of the year increased by 1 °C per decade in the years 1960–2019. The highest ever recorded temperature in the United Kingdom was recorded in 2022 in Coningsby at 40.3 °C (104.5 °F). In 2020, the chances of reaching a temperature above 40 °C (104 °F) were low, but they are 10 times higher than in a climate without human presence. In modest emissions scenario, by the end of the century, it will happen every 15 years and in high emissions scenario every 3–4 years. Summers with temperatures above 35 °C (95 °F) occur in the UK every 5 years, but will occur almost every other year in the high emission scenario by 2100.

=== Extreme weather events ===
The Met Office outlines that more frequent and intense extreme weather events will affect the UK due to climate change.

==== Floods ====
Due to increased rainfall from warmer and wetter winters, increased flooding is expected. An interactive map from the UK government shows areas at risk of flooding.

==== Heat waves ====
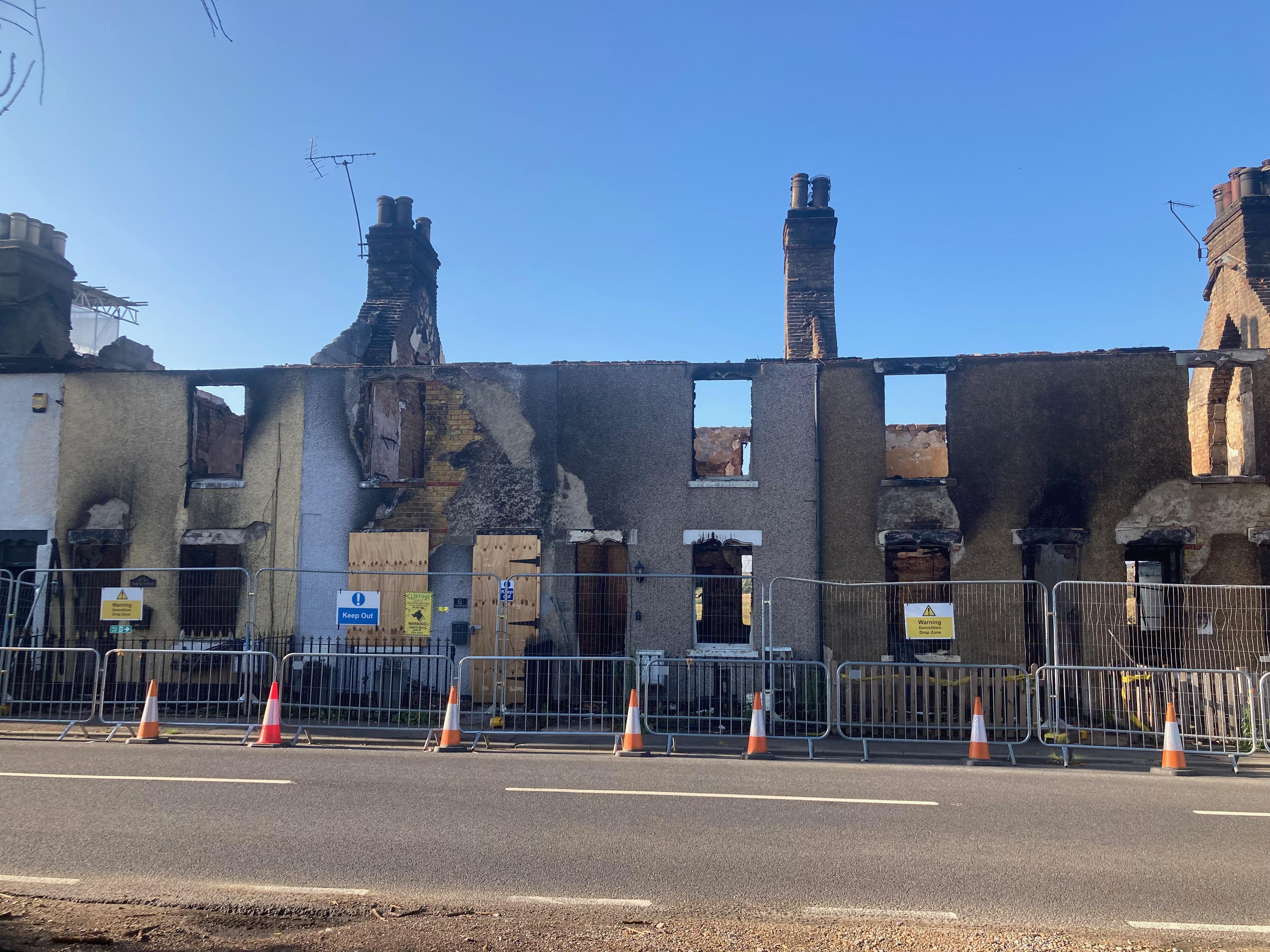
Houses burned down in the Wennington wildfire of July 2022

Heat waves are becoming more intense and more likely in the UK due to climate change. Of the UK's top ten hottest days on record, nine have been recorded between 1990 and 2022. The 2022 heatwave resulted in the first code red extreme heat warning in the country, instigating a declaration of national emergency, and causing wildfires and widespread infrastructure damage.

=== Sea level rise ===
Between 1900 and 2022, the UK's sea level rose by 16.5 centimetres (6.5 in). The rate of rise more than doubled between the early 20th and early 21st century to a rate of 3–5.2 millimetres per year. By 2050, it is predicted that around a third of England's coast will be affected, leading to almost 200,000 homes needing to be abandoned. The most affected regions will be the South West, North West and East Anglia.

=== Water and drought ===
Droughts in the United Kingdom are expected to become more severe. Water quality in rivers and lakes may decline due to higher temperatures, reduced river flows and increased algal blooms in summer, and increased river flows in winter.

=== Effects on ecosystems ===
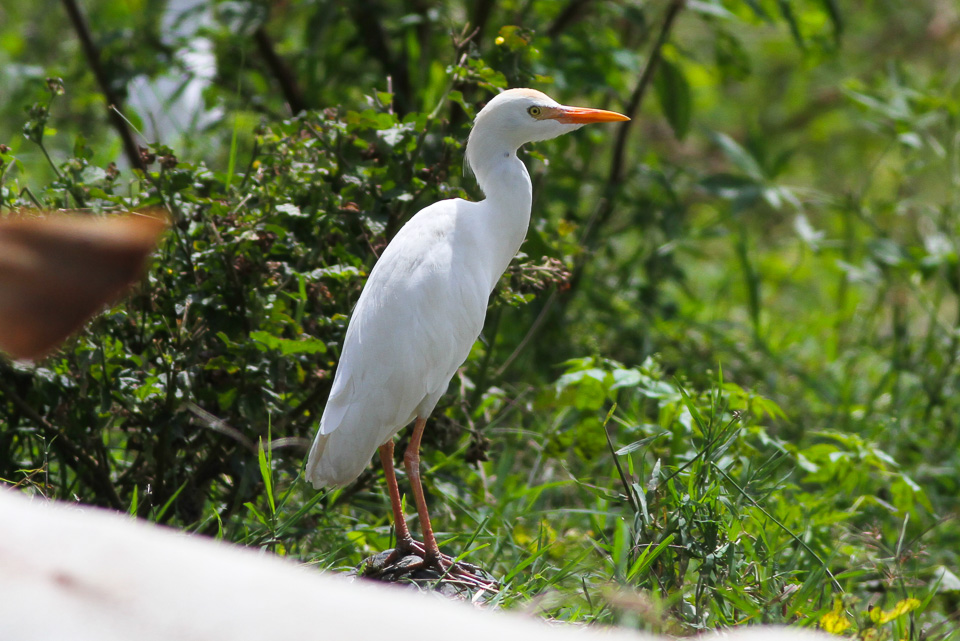
Climate change has led to an increase of warmer-weather adapted species in the UK, such as the cattle egret.

Warming temperatures are affecting wildlife and plant life. Some species' ranges are shifting north, and Scottish alpine plants have declined. With spring coming earlier each year, many plant and animal species are unable to adapt quickly enough. Birds are affected by climate change, with warm weather species like cattle egrets and purple herons observed breeding in the UK for the first time in the 2010s, while cold-adapted birds like lapwings have declined. More regular droughts also have cumulative implications for many British species and ecosystems. For example, in 2022, Ouse Washes wetlands was at risk of drying out.

Climate change will also affect marine life around the British Isles, including some commercially valuable fish species. The distributions of many fish species are expected to shift, with cold adapted species declining and warm adapted species becoming established.

== Effects on people ==
=== Health effects ===
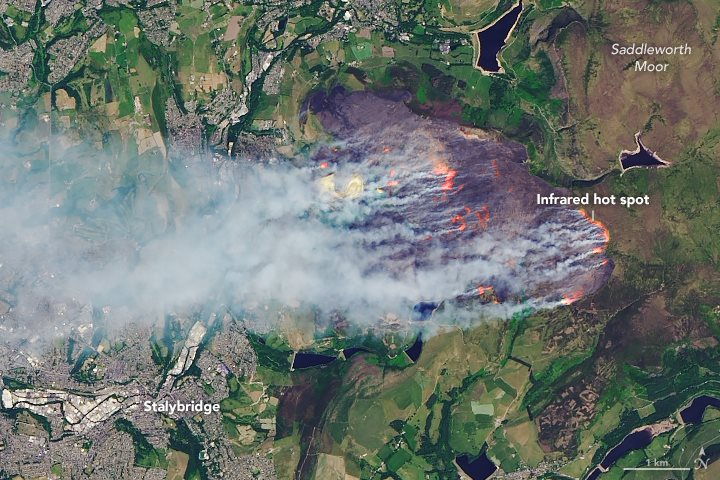
Wildfire on Saddleworth Moor, 2018

The National Health Service describes climate change as a "health emergency", citing the effects of heat waves, floods, and storms on health, as well as the increased spread of infectious diseases such as tick-borne encephalitis and vibriosis.

Due to climate change, the UK has experienced a significant increase in severe heat waves which have dire health consequences. The 2022 heatwaves contributed to nearly 3000 excess deaths – meaning people who are not expected to die during this period. This represents the highest number of deaths during heatwaves since 2004. Most of the extra deaths occurred in those aged over 65. Without climate change mitigation or adaptation measures, heat-related deaths could increase sixfold by the 2050s, particularly affecting children, the elderly and people with pre-existing conditions.

Flooding in the UK presents another major threat, currently affecting over six million people. This number expected to rise significantly as temperatures increase. Beyond physical risks, floods have severe long-lasting mental health consequences for survivors, including post-traumatic stress disorder (PTSD).

=== Economic effects ===
According to the Government, the number of households in flood risk will be up to 970,000 homes in the 2020s, up from around 370,000 in January 2012. The effects of flooding and managing flood risk cost the country about £2.2bn a year, compared with the less than £1bn spent on flood protection and management. UK agriculture is also being affected by drought and weather changes.

In 2020 PricewaterhouseCoopers estimated that Storm Dennis damage to homes, businesses and cars could be between £175m and £225m and Storm Ciara cost up to £200m. Friends of the Earth criticised British government of the intended cuts to flood defence spending. The protection against increasing flood risk as a result of climate change requires rising investment. In 2009, the Environment Agency calculated that the UK needs to be spending £20m more compared to 2010 to 2011 as the baseline, each and every year out to 2035, just to keep pace with climate change.

The British government and the economist Nicholas Stern published the Stern Review on the Economics of Climate Change in 2006. The report states that climate change is the greatest and widest-ranging market failure ever seen, presenting a unique challenge for economics. The Review provides prescriptions including environmental taxes to minimise economic and social disruptions. The Stern Review's main conclusion is that the benefits of strong, early action on climate change far outweigh the costs of not acting. The Review points to the potential effects of climate change on water resources, food production, health, and the environment. According to the Review, without action, the overall costs of climate change will be equivalent to losing at least 5% of global gross domestic product (GDP) each year, now and forever. Including a wider range of risks and costs could increase this to 20% of GDP or more. The review leads to a simple conclusion: the benefits of strong, early action considerably outweigh the costs.

Climate change made the unusual rainfall in autumn and winter 2023–2024, 10 times more probable and 20% stronger. The rainfall led to "severe damage to homes and infrastructure, power blackouts, travel cancellations, and heavy losses of crops and livestock". The damage to arable crops alone is £1.2 billion, without counting vegetables. Claims for house insurance from weather related disasters increased by more than a third. Policies to address climate change can also reduce poverty according to some experts.

== Mitigation ==
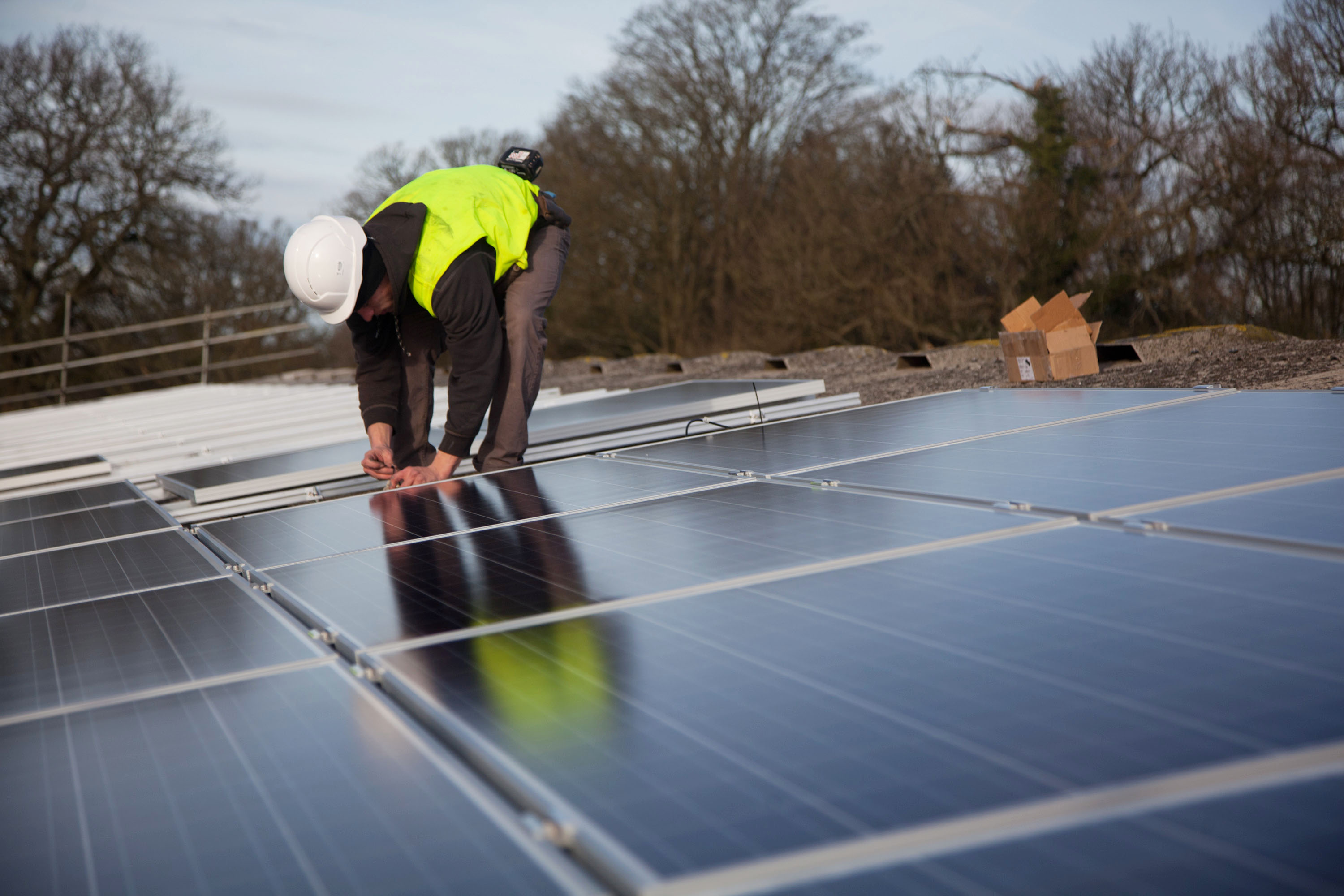
Solar panel installation, Balcombe

In 2019, Prime Minister Theresa May announced the UK would strive to reach carbon neutrality by 2050, making the country the first major economy to do so. Prime Minister Boris Johnson announced in 2020 that UK would set a target of 68% reduction in greenhouse gas emissions by 2030 and include this target in its commitments in the Paris Agreement.

Calculations in 2021 indicated that, to give the world a 50% chance of avoiding a temperature rise of 2 degrees or more, the United Kingdom should increase its climate commitments by 17%. For a 95% chance, it should increase the commitments by 58%. To give a 50% chance of staying below 1.5 degrees, the UK should increase its commitments by 97%.

=== Energy ===
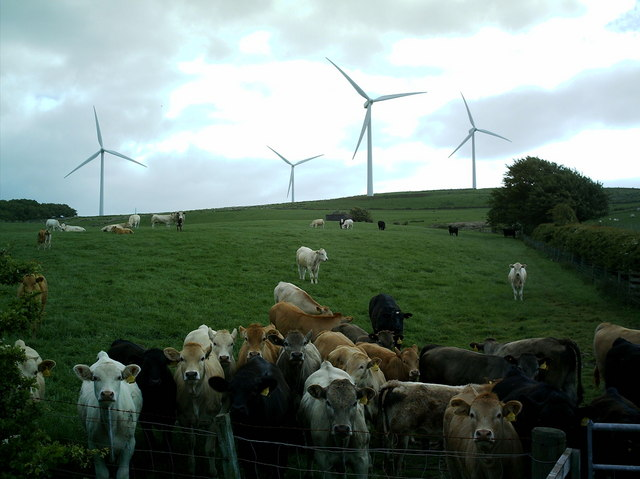
Electricity generated from wind power in the UK increased by 715% between 2009 and 2020.

Under Margaret Thatcher, the UK's coal industry was reduced, with subsidies cut and coal miners' union weakened following a significant miners' strike in 1984. In 2015, the government announced all coal-fired power stations would be closed by 2025. In 2021, it brought forward this coal phase-out target to 2024.

Renewable energy in the United Kingdom refers to energy from renewable sources used for electricity generation, heat and transport in the United Kingdom. In 2024, renewables accounted for 50.4% of UK electricity generation and 16.2% of gross final energy consumption.

Renewable electricity is dominated by wind, with generation from bioenergy, solar power and hydroelectricity contributing less. Renewable heat comes mainly from biomass and heat pumps, and renewable transport energy is supplied mainly through biofuels, with a smaller contribution from renewable electricity used in transport.

Support for renewable electricity has shifted from the Renewables Obligation and Feed-in Tariffs to auctioned Contracts for Difference (CfD) for new large-scale generation and the Smart Export Guarantee for small generators. Renewable transport fuels are supplied under the Renewable Transport Fuel Obligation. Distributed generation is dominated by small-scale solar photovoltaics, and community energy is supported through national and devolved programmes. Costs include technology costs and CfD strike prices, and the network, connection and balancing costs of integrating variable renewables.

Raw data

==== Electric vehicles ====
The adoption of plug-in electric vehicles in the United Kingdom is actively supported by the British government through the plug-in car and van grants schemes and other incentives.

About 745,000 light-duty plug-in electric vehicles had been registered in the UK up until December 2021, consisting of 395,000 all-electric vehicles and 350,000 plug-in hybrids. Until 2019, the UK had the second largest European stock of light-duty plug-in vehicles in use after Norway. As of early 2025, roughly a quarter of overall sales were battery electric.

=== Policies and legislation ===
The Climate Change Programme was launched in 2000 by the Government in response to the United Kingdom's commitments under the 1992 United Nations Conference on Environment and Development and subsequent international climate agreements.

There are in place national legislation, international agreements and the EU directives. The Climate Change and Sustainable Energy Act 2006 aimed to boost heat and electricity micro-generation installations in the UK, helping to cut emissions and reduce fuel poverty. The Climate Change Act 2008 makes it the duty of the Secretary of State to ensure the net UK carbon account for all six Kyoto greenhouse gases for 2050 is at least 80% lower than 1990. It also created the independent Climate Change Committee to advise the government on policies to reach its goals. The Act made the UK the first country to legally mandate reductions in greenhouse gas emissions.

These targets have since been expanded on in the UK's Sixth Carbon Budget of 2021, which set the targets of reducing carbon emissions by 78% in relation to 1990 levels by 2035, and reaching net zero emissions by 2050. The Health and Care Act 2022 includes a target of carbon neutrality for the National Health Service by 2040, and an 80% reduction in emissions by 2028–32.

In May 2019, Parliament approved a motion declaring a national climate change emergency. This does not legally compel the government to act, however. The Climate and Ecological Emergency Bill was tabled as an early day motion in September 2020 and received its first reading the same day.

The United Kingdom does not have a carbon tax. Instead, various fuel taxes and energy taxes have been implemented over the years, such as the fuel duty escalator (1993) and the Climate Change Levy (2001). The UK was a member of the European Union Emission Trading Scheme until it left the EU. It has since implemented its own carbon trading scheme.

=== International cooperation ===
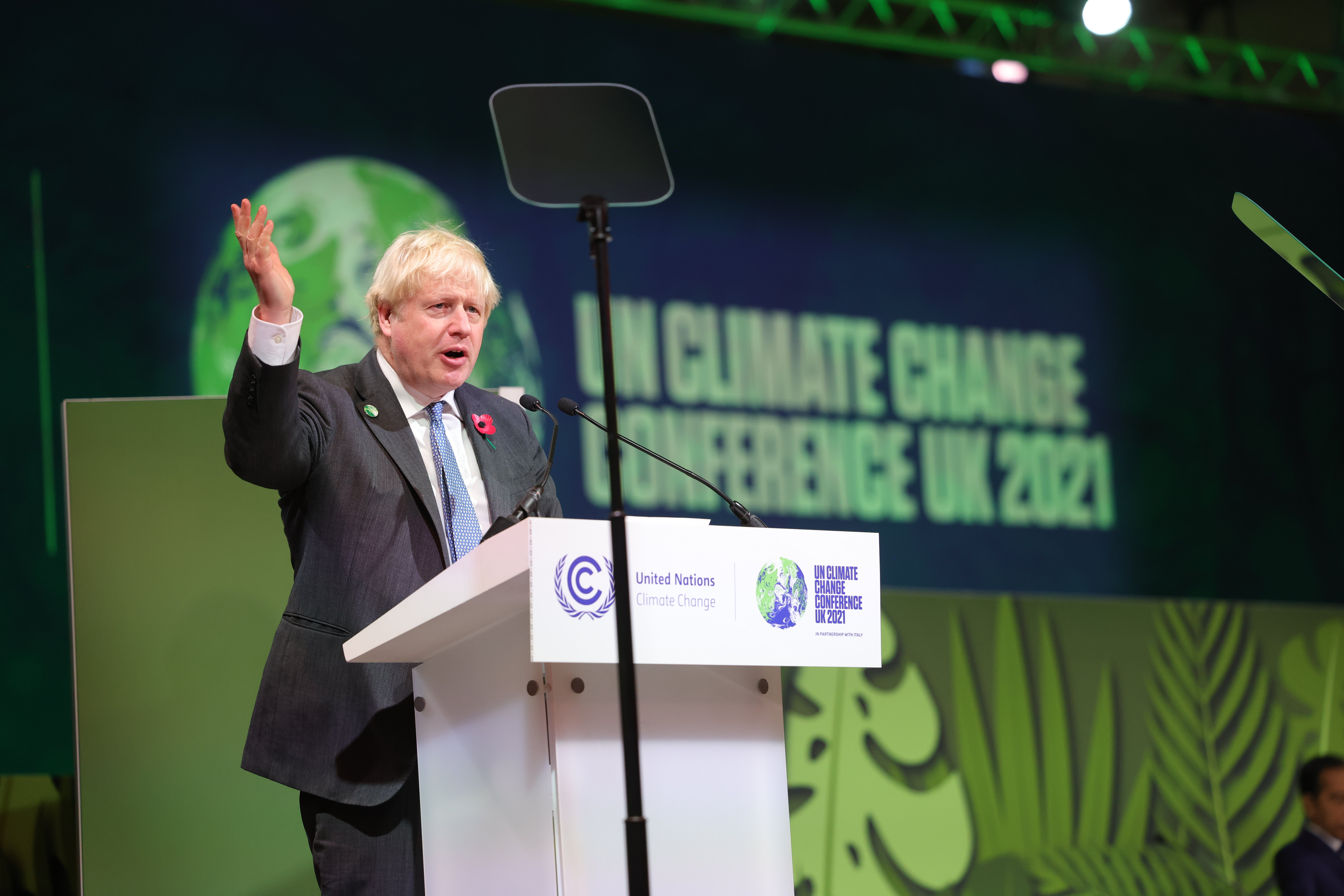
British Prime Minister Boris Johnson speaking at the 2021 United Nations Climate Change Conference in Glasgow.

Since the premiership of Tony Blair, climate change has been a high priority issue in the UK's foreign policy. The UK has raised the issue at meetings of international bodies of which it is a member, including the G8 and United Nations Security Council. The UK was also influential on the climate change policy of the European Union during its membership.

British diplomats have been involved in the negotiation of international agreements in United Nations summits. Ahead of the 2009 conference while talks had been stalling, prime minister Gordon Brown launched a manifesto calling for an international agreement that would bring investment into climate change adaptation in developing countries. The UK hosted the 2021 UN Climate Change Conference in Glasgow, during which the Glasgow Climate Pact was negotiated and agreed. In the lead-up to the conference, Richard Moore said the Secret Intelligence Service had begun monitoring the activities of major polluters to ensure they adhere to their commitments on mitigation and the Foreign, Commonwealth and Development Office said it would put £290m towards climate change initiatives in developing countries.

In 2025, the United Kingdom together with European Union China, Brazil and others, joined the Global carbon market coalition. According to some calculations, a global carbon market can speed up emission reduction seven-fold.

=== Policy Instruments ===
==== Climate Change Levy (CCL) ====
A Climate Change Levy is a tax on carbon use in industry, commerce and the public sector introduced by the British government in 2001, with the overall aim of promoting carbon efficiency and stimulating investment in low carbon technology. While representing what is classed as a "market-based instrument," in that it represents an economic incentive to manage carbon usage more effectively, the CCL is not what is understood as market governance. This is because CCL is not representative of the market steering actors in their carbon behaviour, but the government imposing a sanction to govern behaviour, which is constitutive of hierarchical governance.

==== Climate Change Agreements (CCAs) ====
Introduced at the same time as the CCL, Climate Change Agreements are "negotiated agreements between sector industry organisations and the government" whereby "energy-intensive industries can obtain a 65% discount from the CCL, provided they meet challenging targets for improving their energy efficiency or reducing carbon emissions". This is an example of governing carbon behaviour in a more indirect fashion. The DECC is still the authoritative body, but these voluntary agreements represent their attempt to create an atmosphere where it is seen as advantageous to business to manage carbon emissions. They have not done this through traditional regulatory controls, in that they have not imposed this rule upon industry. By instead offering businesses incentives to reduce carbon emissions through a tax reduction, they are enhancing the desire of business sectors to make the choice to become more carbon efficient. The DECC asserts its authority over the process by the imposition of penalties if participating industries do not comply with their agreed targets. It represents the government concerning itself with the outcome of the policy, rather than regulating the entire process.

==== Enhanced Capital Allowances (ECA) ====
This represents a further example of a government implemented, voluntary scheme that shapes the carbon behaviour of businesses, but the actual management of this scheme is delegated to a specialised body, The Carbon Trust. The scheme encourages businesses to invest in low-carbon technology by offering a "100% first-year capital allowances on their spending on qualifying plant and machinery". Only new equipment is eligible for an ECA – used or second-hand equipment does not qualify. Eligible equipment, and the criteria they have to meet, is published in the Energy Technology List. The criteria are reviewed annually to keep pace with technological progress

===== The Carbon Trust and the ECA =====
By providing a management service on behalf of the government, The Carbon Trust is actually helping govern a part of the carbon sector in England. Although created by the government in 2001, they are a private company, which means that, arguably, they represent the diminishment of central capacity to fulfil governing tasks. However, if the workings of the scheme and the part The Carbon Trust have to play is examined, then the opposite is true. In this instance DECC involved The Carbon Trust, as a body specialised in energy efficiency, and delegated responsibility to them "to ensure sufficient expertise" is brought to the governing process. It is still the government's decision to delegate such responsibility, and it is their policy that is being enacted. They have simply enlisted the help of an expert body to ensure that their desired outcomes are met.

=== Emissions trading ===
The UK Emissions Trading Scheme is a massive part of carbon governance. While it has been argued that this is an attempt to allow markets to govern carbon emissions by incentivising their proper management Although emissions allowances are traded and priced through market mechanisms, government institutions, the EU, and the Department of Energy and Climate Change (DECC) have continued to play a central role in regulating emissions trading in England. Scholars have therefore described UK carbon governance as combining market-based instruments with hierarchical state regulation.

==== The UK Emissions Trading Scheme (UK ETS) ====
The former UK Emissions Trading Scheme was a voluntary cap-and-trade scheme where participants were allocated an allowance of emissions, which included other GHGs as well as carbon, and if a participating company emitted less than their cap for that year they could trade the remaining allowances. It has now closed to new participants but allowances are still traded. While this may appear as recourse to the market to effectively govern carbon emissions, the fact remains "in order to govern through markets, governments must first create those markets through the exercise of a hierarchical authority". The UK ETS was created by the Department for Environment, Food and Rural Affairs (DEFRA), the then responsible government department, and it was the government's ambitious emissions reduction target that "spurred the UK to innovate with" this particular instrument. The Trading Registry for emissions is also run through DECC, exemplifying the government's centralisation of the process and while it was left to businesses to decide how to manage their carbon emissions, and the market to decide the price, it was the governments desire to reach emissions targets and "reduce [the] economic cost" of doing so that was being represented.

A new post-Brexit UK Emissions Trading Scheme (UK ETS) came into operation on 1 January 2021 following the UK's departure from the European Union.

==== EU Emissions Trading Scheme (EU ETS) ====
Introduced by the European Commission (EC) and launched in 2005, the EU Emissions Trading Scheme is similar to the UK ETS in the sense that it is a cap-and-trade scheme, but it is mandatory and its participants account for 40% of the EU's total GHG emissions. With regard to carbon governance in England, the emissions trading scheme covers energy-intensive industries and the power sector, which together have historically accounted for approximately 48% of the United Kingdom's greenhouse gas emissions. Because the European Commission exercised legislative authority over the European Union Emissions Trading System (EU ETS), scholars have argued that its implementation shifted important aspects of carbon market regulation from the United Kingdom to the European Union, creating a multi-level system of climate governance.Rhodes cited "the loss of functions by British government to EU institutions" ...as evidence of the nation state becoming "hollowed out", although scholars have also argued that the British government retained significant authority over the implementation and operation of emissions trading through its role within the broader framework of multi-level climate governance.}

==== CRC Energy Efficiency Scheme ====
The CRC Energy Efficiency Scheme is further evidence of the UK government's "recourse to specialised regulatory remits" in order to effectively govern carbon emissions in England. The CRC scheme is a further mandatory cap-and-trade scheme aimed at large public and private sector organisations who account for 10% of the UK's carbon emissions. It seeks to include organisations not covered by the EU ETS. It is again reflective of the UK government's disposition towards employing market mechanisms in order to govern carbon emissions, and it is they who have imposed this legislation on businesses, representing an exercise of central power. However, a large bulk of the implementation of the scheme is carried out by The Environment Agency.

===== The Environment Agency and the CRC =====
The Environment Agency has a key role to play in the imposition of the scheme. It is responsible for collecting data regarding participating companies' emissions which it then ranks in a league table "based on participant's changes in energy use against a baseline and not their total emissions" with the hope that carbon efficiency will become a "reputational issue" for those involved. The Environment Agency also hosts the CRC Registry where participants can register details and trade their emissions. It is also responsible for administering any sanctions for non-compliance. This is a classic example of the government using the skills of, in this case, a non-governmental public body in order to administer a policy they have established. Again, it is not an example of the power to govern being taken away from central government as the "enactment of legislation is evident as an explicit assertion of hierarchy". It is the government who has delegated this responsibility to The Environment Agency, and they remain the ultimate statutory authority for the scheme.

== Adaptation ==
The UK Climate Change Risk Assessment sets out the risks facing the UK. It informs the National Adaptation Programme.

The National Adaptation Programme (NAP) seek to create a "climate-ready society" and expects households to adapt to climate change. The NAP outline actions the government and other entities will take to adapt to climate change challenges e.g. in England over a five-year period. They cover aspects such as the natural environment, infrastructure, people and the built environment, business and industry, and local government sectors. NAP3 explains the government's plans to adapt to climate change between 2023 and 2028.

A systematic review in Climatic Change concluded many households in the UK struggled to achieve long-term adaptive capacity. Increased flood risk has implications for the UK's privatised insurance sector and relevant governance of it. The Bank of England has outlined a policy of maintaining financial stability amid climate change effects on the UK. The town of Happisburgh, where homes are being affected by coastal erosion and sea level rise, is the location of a "Pathfinder" project where owners of homes about to fall into the sea were offered market prices to relocate inland.

The Wildlife Trusts have suggested reintroduction of Eurasian beavers improves resilience of British rivers and wetlands to droughts, create carbon sinks and prevent flooding.

== Society and culture ==
=== Education ===
In the United Kingdom, the Teach the Future campaign aims to rapidly repurpose the education system around the climate emergency and ecological crisis; they are cohosted by the UK Student Climate Network and SOS-UK and are in the process of devolving their campaign to Scotland and Northern Ireland from England.

They have three asks of the Government:

- A government commissioned review into how the English formal education system is preparing students for the climate emergency and ecological crisis
- The inclusion of the climate emergency and ecological crisis in English teaching standards and training
- The enactment of an English Climate Emergency Education Act - the first student written bill in history

=== Public opinion ===
In a 2022 Pew Research Center survey, 75% of UK respondents agreed climate change is a major threat to the country.

By 2021, YouGov recorded that 72% of Britons believe that climate change is caused by human activity, which had increased from 49% in 2013. According to the Office for National Statistics, as of October 2021, 75% of British adults said that they either very or somewhat worried about climate change, whilst 19% were neither worried or unworried. British women were more likely than men to be worried about the effects of climate change, as were younger compared to older age groups.

=== Politics ===
In 1989, Margaret Thatcher made two speeches that are considered among the earliest statements by a world leader on climate change.

Climate change has been discussed by members of the Parliament of the United Kingdom; in 2019, Carbon Brief analysed mention of climate change in the UK parliamentary record from Hansard. It found that mention of the "greenhouse effect" and "global warming" had appeared in British parliamentary records since the 1980s, with the term "climate change" used more since the late 1990s. The first mention was by Jestyn Philipps in 1969. It concluded that Labour MPs were the most vocal party on the issue, mentioning climate change 8,463 times, compared to 5,860 by Conservative MPs and 2,426 by Liberal Democrat MPs.

Before 2005 and 2006, climate change received little political attention in the UK. However, between 2006 and 2010, campaigns by environmental non-governmental organization generated attention towards climate change in British media, and it became a bipartisan issue in UK politics. The Climate Change Act 2008 passed with the support of 463 MPs from several political parties, and only 5 against. Under David Cameron, the Conservative Party adopted environmental policies as a means to connect with younger voters, with Cameron's support of the Big Ask campaign being a critical turning point. The Conservative–Liberal Democrat coalition maintained political momentum on climate policy, but criticism from the political right later weakened Cameron's international leadership on the issue. The Conservatives prioritised the issue during the premiership of Boris Johnson.

The Global Warming Policy Foundation is a climate change denialist think tank and lobby group founded by former chancellor Lord Nigel Lawson in 2009. In 2020, some members of the UK Independence Party were characterised as deniers who had dismissed climate change risks and the party has opposed climate policies, with some claims within its 2013 energy policy document found to be based on documents from the Global Warming Policy Foundation. The Global Warming Policy Foundation and some members of the Conservative Party shifted to opposing the perceived cost of net zero rather than outright denying the occurrence of climate change in the 2020s. According to analysis of social media posts in The Guardian, at least thirty Reform UK prospective parliamentary candidates in 2024 went beyond mere scepticism about net zero, to casting doubt on the validity of human-caused global warming, some employing accusations of "hoaxes" or "scams" by "globalist elites" or "the Illuminati".

In January 2025, Nigel Farage was the guest of honour at the launch of a climate denying lobby group, which was also attended by former UK prime minister, Liz Truss and Conservative Party shadow minister, Andrew Griffith.

=== Activism and cultural responses ===
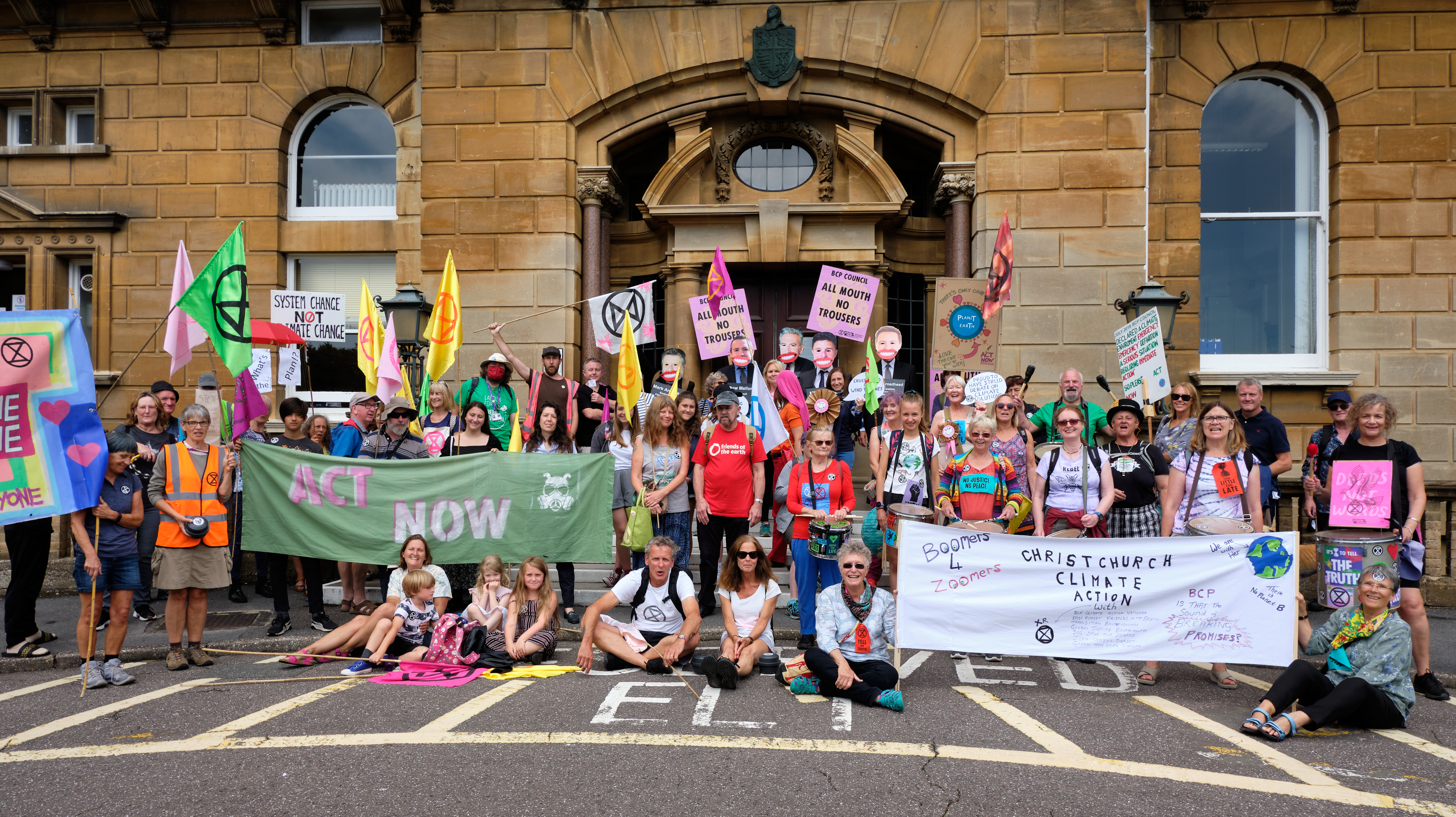
Activist group Extinction Rebellion at a climate change protest in Bournemouth, 2021.

Environmental direct action has occurred in the UK. Camps for Climate Action began in 2006 with the Drax Power Station, until their disbandment in 2011. School strikes took place from the 2010s, and groups such as Extinction Rebellion and Insulate Britain using tactics such as traffic obstruction in protest of climate change issues. Extinction Rebellion was founded by a group of UK activists in 2018, subsequently expanding to other countries and influencing the global climate movement.

In February 2014 during major flooding the Church of England said that it will pull its investments from companies that fail to do enough to fight the "great demon" of climate change and ignore the church's theological, moral and social priorities. In 2007, a London Live Earth concert took place to raise awareness of climate change and in 2019, numerous musicians, record labels and venues in the British music industry formed environmental pressure group Music Declares Emergency to demand mitigation.

=== Litigation ===
In December 2020, three British citizens, Marina Tricks, Adetola Onamade, Jerry Amokwandoh, and the climate litigation charity, Plan B, announced that they were taking legal action against the UK government for failing to take sufficient action to address the climate and ecological crisis. The plaintiffs announced that they will allege that the government's ongoing funding of fossil fuels both in the UK and other countries constitute a violation of their rights to life and to family life, as well as violating the Paris Agreement and the UK Climate Change Act of 2008.

In 2022, it was claimed in McGaughey and Davies v Universities Superannuation Scheme Ltd that the directors of the UK's largest pension fund, USS Ltd had breached their duty to act for proper purposes under the Companies Act 2006 section 171, by failing to have a plan to divest fossil fuels from the fund's portfolio. The claim did not succeed in the High Court, and the claimants appealed to the Court of Appeal, being granted permission for a June 2023 hearing. The case alleges that the right to life must be used to interpret duties in company law, and that because fossil fuels must cease to exist, any investments using them pose a "risk of significant financial detriment".

In February 2023, ClientEarth filed a derivative action claim against Shell's board of directors for putting the company at risk by not transitioning away from fossil fuels quickly enough. ClientEarth said the lawsuit marked "the first time ever that a company's board has been challenged on its failure to properly prepare for the energy transition".

=== Media coverage ===
British tabloid newspaper reporting on climate change between 2000 and 2006 significantly diverged from the scientific consensus that climate change is driven by human activity. The political leaning of newspapers influenced their likelihood of covering climate change, with the left-leaning The Guardian paper covering the issue more than the more conservative Times, Daily Telegraph and Daily Mail between 1997 and 2017. The BBC has faced criticism for inviting fringe views into coverage of climate change, and in 2018 admitted that it had covered climate change "wrong too often" and that it was false balance to invite deniers into its coverage. Media coverage of the July 2022 heat wave corresponded to different political viewpoints, particularly whether climate change was mentioned or the severity of the heat wave was downplayed.

=== Monarchy ===
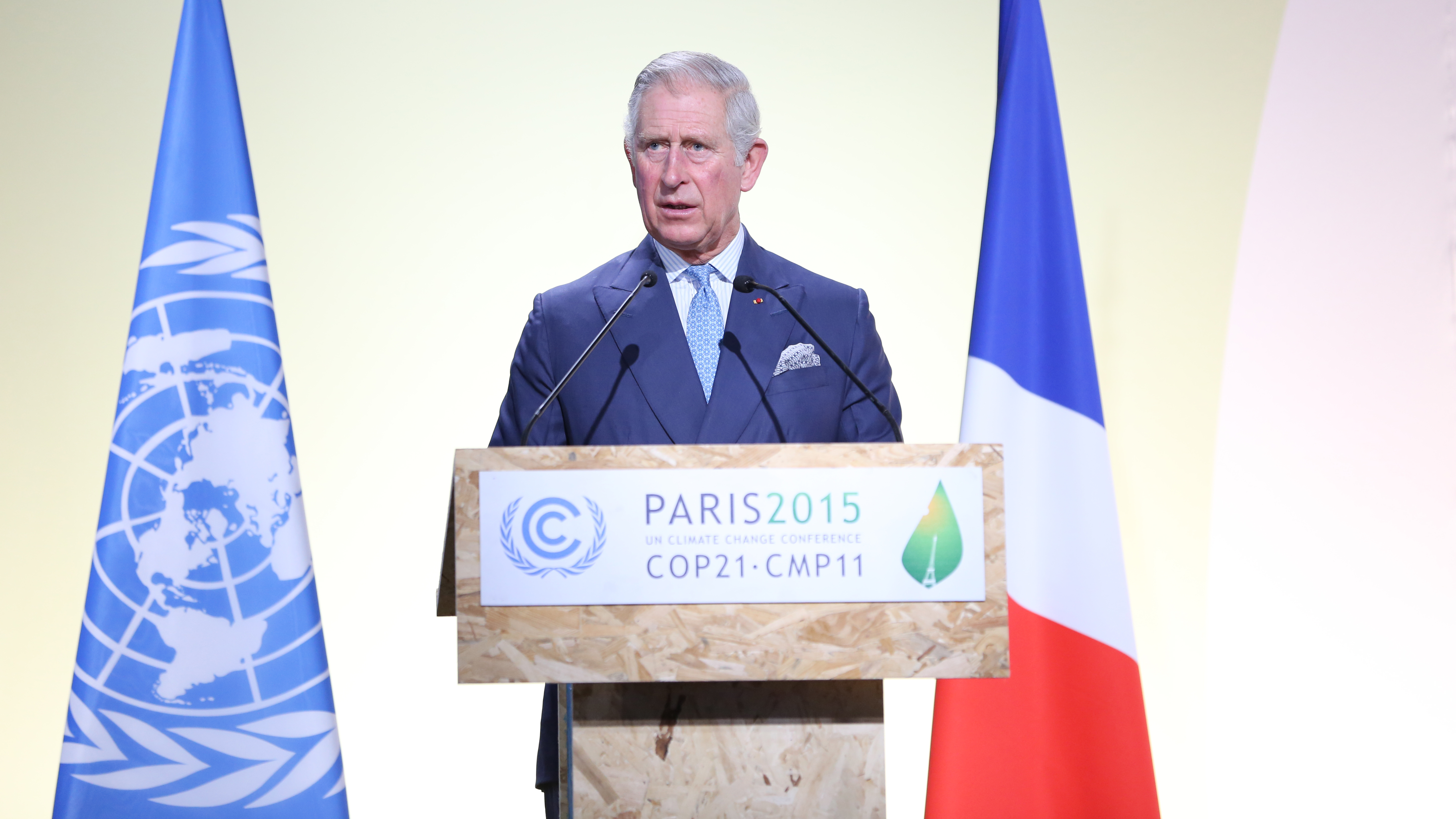
Prince Charles speaking at the opening ceremony of the 2015 United Nations Climate Change Conference.

The British royal family have advocated for climate change mitigation. Charles III has expressed concern over the effects of climate change and called for action on the issue among world leaders, including advocating for a "Marshall-like plan" to address it. Elizabeth II called for action on climate change at COP26. Prince William and Prince Harry also adopted climate change causes, with The Royal Foundation funding the Earthshot Prize under William's patronage. Environmentalists have recognised their role in the cause, but have been critical of the ecological condition of the Crown Estate.

=== Non-governmental organisations in the process ===
While there are several instruments employed by central government to set targets and influence carbon behaviour in businesses and in individuals, how these actors achieve the reductions being set is not specified explicitly by DECC. In this case, businesses often rely on non-governmental organisations (NGOs) to help them deliver the targets being set by government regulation. These NGOs are experts in the carbon and energy field and are therefore consulted upon by businesses and the government in order to ensure that policies are delivered effectively. In that way DECC can be said to be at the centre of a "highly centralised network" of carbon governance actors. This does detract from their hierarchical authority of DECC as they are the central figure in the network, it is simply a recognition that they need to "forge coalitions with societal interests in order to achieve their policy goals".

==== Climate Energy ====
A good example of an NGO that has close links with the government and helps deliver their policy goals is Climate Energy. Established in 2005, they are an energy agency "specialising in advice and funding solutions" for businesses and homeowners to help them with carbon efficiency. They offer a range of services including a consultancy service and grants for low carbon technologies. What is important to note here is that Climate Energy is a private company and therefore has no standing within government, but it does have a significant role to play in government legislation, as exemplified below.

===== Climate Energy and the Carbon Emission Reduction Target (CERT) =====
CERT is another scheme introduced by the government that requires large energy supply companies to "make savings in the amount of CO_{2} emitted by householders". It obliges energy companies to "promote and offer funding towards measures that improve energy efficiency in the home". While a good intentioned scheme, individual householders are arguably not in a position to best judge what measures are best suited to their position, or may not be aware of what grants are available to them. Climate Energy offers a consultancy service promising to "leverage funding from utilities to support projects" for their clients through their connections in the industry. The initial government legislation was aimed at the energy suppliers with the overall aim of delivering individual household carbon reduction, but the actual delivery of this service has been performed by a private energy agency. The government is still the "central player" in that they have implemented the policy, but Climate Energy's services ensure that it is delivered and represents further evidence of central government steering the actions of actors at lower levels.

===== Climate energy and The Green Deal =====
The Green Deal looks set to become a major part of carbon governance in the future, in that it is aimed at individual households in an attempt to improve carbon efficiency and make the transition for households to low-carbon energy as cost-effective as possible. Climate Energy have actually been consulted by DECC as part of the consultation process before The Green Deal is implemented fully. This is representative of a discretionary style of governance, in that the government department is keen to consult specialised agencies before implementing their scheme. The citing of Climate Energy as a consultee is used to legitimise the decision as it shows that a climate and energy efficiency expert has influenced the policy. The Green Deal will still be a centrally commissioned and regulated scheme, but the consultation process allows for specialist views to be taken into account when the policy is formulated.

== By region ==
=== London ===
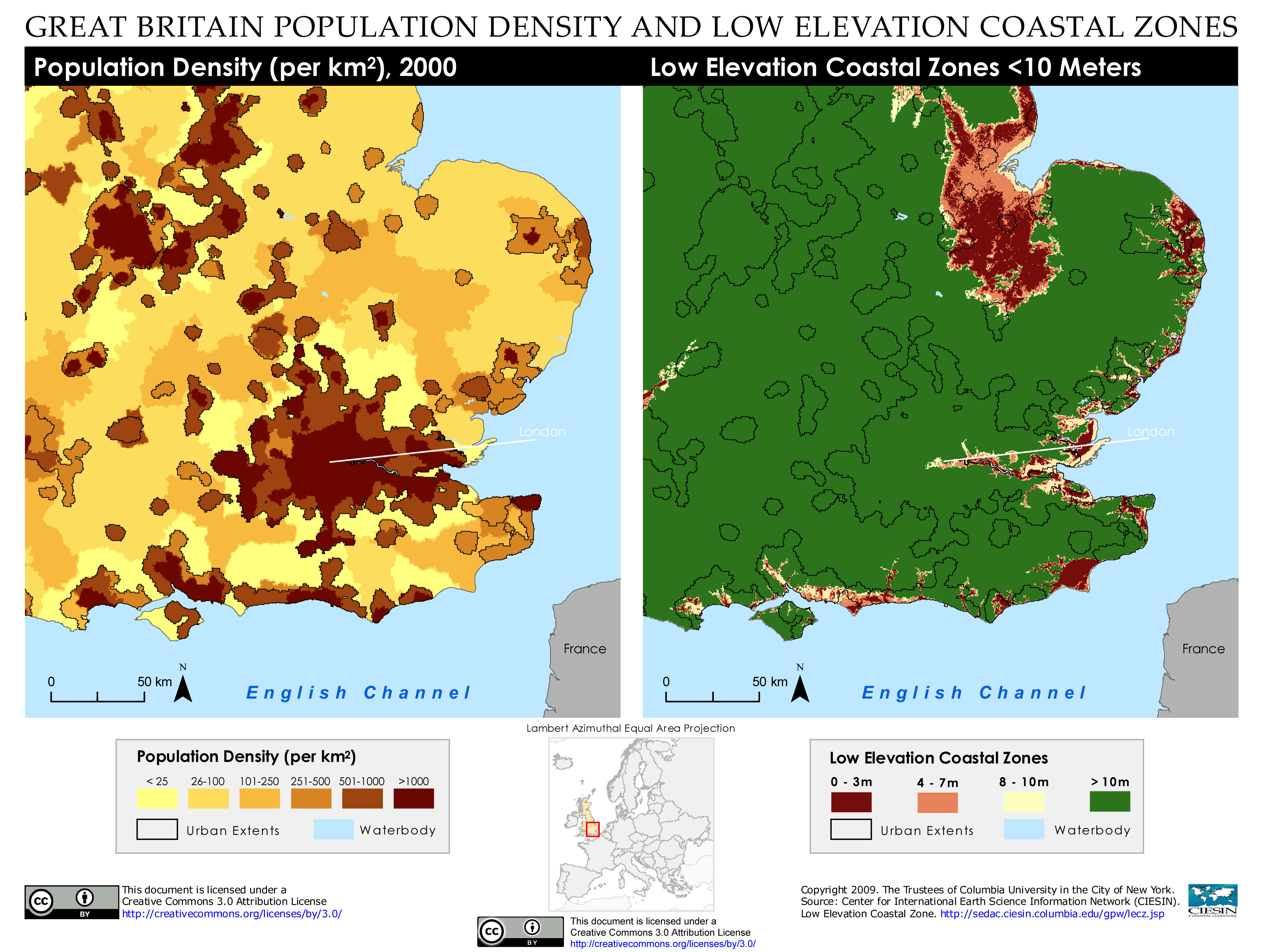
London population density and low elevation coastal zones.

London is particularly vulnerable to climate change, with concern among hydrological experts that households in the city may run out of water before 2050.

=== Scotland ===
Climate change in Scotland is already causing a range of impacts on Scotland. 2022 was Scotland's warmest year on record with the temperature reaching 35°C in the Scottish Borders in July.

Climate change has already changed timings of spring events such as leaf unfolding, bird migration and egg-laying. Severe effects are likely to occur on biodiversity.

The mitigation of climate change and adaptation is a matter for the devolved Scottish Parliament.

=== Wales ===
Emissions are reducing in Wales. After 2016, shutting the last coal-fired power station in Wales contributed "toward half" of the fall in emissions in 2016. Over the last 30 years, there has been a 31% cut in emissions. The goal for 2030 is to have reached a 63% reduction, and by 2050 to reach net-zero carbon emission. These aims are a significant challenge.

The Welsh Government owns a company, Ynni Cymru, which funds community energy projects. The Welsh Government owns a company, Trydan Gwyrdd Cymru to develop state-owned energy - specifically offshore wind. Trydan Gwyrdd Cymru has been suggested as a model for Great British Energy.

The Environment (Wales) Act 2016 required the Welsh Government to set reduced emission targets by the end of 2018.

=== England ===
The government body responsible for climate change mitigation, the Department of Energy and Climate Change (DECC), is the "main external dynamic" behind governing actions in this area, and is responsible for central co-ordination". The department may rely on other bodies to deliver its desired outcomes, but it is still ultimately responsible for the imposition of the rules and regulations that "steer (carbon) governmental action at the national level". It is therefore evident that carbon governance in England is hierarchical in nature, in that "legislative decisions and executive decisions" are the main dynamic behind carbon governance action. This does not deny the existence of a network of bodies around DECC who are part of the process, but they are supplementary actors who are steered by central decisions. The other countries of the UK (Scotland, Wales and Northern Ireland) all have devolved assemblies who are responsible for the governance of carbon emissions in their respective countries.

== See also ==
- 4 Degrees and Beyond International Climate Conference, a 2009 conference held in Oxford
- A Green New Deal
- Climate change in Europe
- Climate change in Ireland
- Committee on Climate Change
- Environmental effects of aviation in the United Kingdom
- Environmental inequality in the United Kingdom
- Environmental issues in the United Kingdom
- Green Party of England and Wales
- London Climate Change Agency
- Scottish Greens
