= Energy conservation in the United Kingdom =

Various energy conservation measures are taken in the United Kingdom.

Much of the emphasis in energy debates tends to focus on the supply side of the issue, and ignore the demand. A number of commentators are concerned that this is being largely overlooked, partly due to the strength of the energy industry lobby. Energy conservation also has great potential, and may be able to significantly cut the size of the supposed energy gap, if early and concerted action is taken.

== General ==
The UK Government cut subsidies on a range of renewable energy systems and energy efficient cars in 2015. There were fears this could make reaching targets for reducing carbon emissions unreachable.

== Housing ==
Along with road transport, domestic housing and energy use is currently one of the major obstacles to achieving carbon reduction targets. According to a report from 2008, housing accounts for 27% of carbon dioxide emissions in the United Kingdom. Action is being taken on new buildings through 2006 changes to the Building Regulations, and on existing housing through the Carbon Emission Reduction Target. The Government is introducing The Green Deal. It proposes tying low interest loans for energy efficiency improvements to the energy bills of the properties the upgrades are performed on. These debts would then be passed onto new occupiers when they take over the payment of the bills. It is proposed that the costs of the loan repayments would be less than the savings on the bills from the upgrades, however this will be a guideline and not legally enforceable guarantee. It is believed that energy bills like housing a cost people always meet those giving investors a secure return.

== Domestic appliances ==
In the housing sector, consumer electronics and IT products are an area where energy use is expected to continue to rise rapidly. In the decade from the mid-1990s to the mid-2000s electricity consumed by such goods rose by 47%. By the early 2010s it is expected to have risen again by over 80%. It was estimated that, in 2004, at least 8% of domestic electricity was used by items in standby mode, representing 360 kWh and 42 kg of carbon emissions for each household.

Consumption of electricity by all domestic appliances (including cooking and lighting) rise by 123% between 1970 and 2003, and by 223% when cooking and lighting are excluded.

== Non domestic energy use ==
The Energy Savings Opportunity Scheme (ESOS) requires all large businesses in the UK to undertake mandatory assessments looking at energy use and energy efficiency opportunities at least once every four years. The deadline for the first compliance period is 5 December 2015. The ESOS Regulations 2014 bring into force Article 8 of the EU Energy Efficiency Directive. The aim of ESOS is for large businesses to identify energy savings opportunities by compelling them by legislation to conduct energy audits. The audit has to account for 90% of their energy consumption and the opportunities identified do not have to be implemented. The scheme is regulated by the UK Environment Agency who have said that they are taking a light touch to this piece of legislation, however failure to conduct an ESOS audit could see companies liable for fines of up to £50,000.

The compliance date for the first phase was 5 December 2015, and all required participants (those companies with over 250 employees or a turnover of 50m Euros and a balance sheet of 43m Euros) were required to have completed an energy audit by an appointed lead assessor by this date. The compliance for the second phase of the scheme was 5 December 2019 and the qualification requirements remained unchanged from the first phase.

The Streamlined Energy and Carbon Reporting scheme (SECR) is a mandatory reporting framework newly applicable to both quoted and large unquoted companies in the UK (those companies with turnover (or gross income) of £36 million or more, balance sheet assets of £18 million or more, or 250 employees or more). Under changes introduced by the 2013 and 2018 Regulations, quoted companies of any size that are required to prepare a Directors’ Report under Part 15 of the Companies Act 2006, are required to disclose information relating to their energy use and GHG emissions. As of April 2020, qualifying companies must publicly disclose their total annual energy consumption, broken down by source, and the associated greenhouse gas emissions arising from the usage of each fuel type. This needs to be disclosed at the end of the financial year from April 2020 onwards. This report is incorporated within the company’s official accounts.

== Transport ==
Transport continues to grow as a significant user of fuel in the UK, and along with housing, this continues to be one of the major challenges to achieving the Government's carbon reduction targets.

By 2003 the amount of fuel used by transport had risen by around 60% since 1970. While oil is the main energy source, electricity and LPG make up a small percentage. Carbon emissions from transport have almost doubled over this period. Increasing car usage, increasing engine sizes, and levels of congestion are some of the problem areas, as is increasing air travel.

=== Road transport ===
Efforts to reduce emissions of nitrogen oxides, sulphur dioxide and particulates from diesel vehicles have actually led to an increase in fuel consumption and carbon dioxide emissions. Current technology should allow further reductions in emissions without increases in fuel consumption, and hopefully future technology will allow fuel consumption, and therefore CO_{2} emissions, to reduce.

The basis of Vehicle Excise Duty (VED), also known as "road tax", was changed so that cars registered on or after 1 March 2001 are taxed according to the VED band that they fall into. VED bands are based on the results of a laboratory test, designed to calculate the theoretical potential emissions of the vehicle in grammes of CO_{2} per kilometre travelled, under ideal conditions. This has encouraged a 21% increase in the ownership of diesel cars, which produce lower CO_{2} emissions, but increase particulates. Company Car Tax, regulated by Her Majesty's Revenue and Customs (HMRC) department, was also revised to reflect both the list price and CO_{2} emissions.

A voluntary scheme to display Fuel Economy Labels on new cars was introduced during July 2005, including information on Vehicle Excise Duty and likely fuel costs. The scheme brings the UK into line with European Directive 1999/94/EC, and aims to influence the behaviour of both consumers and manufacturers.

During the 1990s the Fuel Price Escalator was used to raise road fuel tax in an attempt to reduce vehicle usage and cut emissions. The mechanism was abandoned in the wake of the 2000 fuel protests. In the December 2006 Pre-Budget Report the Government announced a rise in fuel tax, and stated that fuel prices should rise each year 'at least in line with inflation'.

From 2008, a Renewable Transport Fuel Obligation is being introduced, under which petrol and diesel are likely to be blended with 5% biofuels by 2010. It is anticipated that this will cut carbon emissions in the transport sector by between 2% and 3%.

The Low Carbon Vehicle Partnership is pursuing the goal that new cars should produce no more than 100 g/km of CO_{2} by 2012. It also works in on reducing carbon emissions from commercial vehicles and in the area of alternative fuels.

=== Domestic shipping ===
Although 7.5% of freight within the UK is moved by coastal shipping and on inland waterways (in tonne kilometres, excluding crude oil from the North Sea), this is largely limited to stone, aggregates and refined petroleum. A series of reports have discussed the financial and environmental advantages of increasing this proportion. Compared to road transport, carbon emissions are around 80% less and nitrogen dioxide about 35% less.

As a result, the issue is receiving more attention with, for example, British Waterways considering the potential for developing inland container ports. Blocks to the regular movement of containers include the lack of regular shipping services by reliable shippers of adequate size, and the additional handling costs involved.

In some areas, including London, investment is being made in the canal infrastructure in order to boost freight transport, and action is being taken to protect the remaining wharves on the Thames.

=== Air transport ===
Air transport is currently taxed through Air Passenger Duty.

Carbon emissions from international aviation are currently excluded from UK and international carbon reduction targets. Due to the current and projected rise in passenger numbers, the sector is expected to become a major source of emissions in the future. In 1998, 123.9 million international passengers were carried through UK airports (159.1 million in total, including domestic aviation). Due to the expansion of airport capacity envisaged by the Department for Transport's white paper The Future of Air Transport, it is forecast that 470 million passengers are likely to be carried by 2030.

Using the Department for Transport's 'best case' emission forecasts, in their August 2006 report the Environmental Audit Select Committee expect that the sector will account for 24% of the UK's emissions in 2050, compared to around 5% in 2006. In addition, due to a variety of altitude-related factors, carbon emissions from aviation are considered to be between 2 and 4 times as damaging as emissions at ground level. The Select Committee have called for a number of actions to combat this projected emissions increase, including the taxation of aviation fuel, the imposition of VAT on international air tickets, and a rise in Air Passenger Duty.

== Industry ==
Compared to 1990, energy use by industry had fallen by over 5% by 2004.

The highest profile initiative to cut carbon emissions is the European Union Emission Trading Scheme, which is operated in the UK under the 'Greenhouse Gas Emissions Trading Scheme Regulations'. Under Phase I of the scheme, the UK was allocated an allowance of 736 million tonnes of CO_{2} for the period 2005-2007 (i.e. an annual average of 245.3 million tonnes). An annual average of 246.2 million tonnes has been set for the Phase II period (2008–2012).

Other measures affecting industry include the Climate Change Levy and Climate Change Agreements.

In 2019, the United Kingdom passed the net zero emissions law which requires all greenhouse gas emissions to be reduced to net zero by 2050. A range of techniques will be required including carbon sinks (greenhouse gas removal) in order to counterbalance emissions from agriculture and aviation. These carbon sinks might include reforestation, habitat restoration, soil carbon sequestration, bioenergy with carbon capture and storage and even direct air capture. The UK government has recently linked attainment of net zero targets as a potential mechanism for improved air quality as a co-benefit.

In April 2026, the Science, Innovation and Technology Select Committee began an inquiry into using low-energy computing to reduce the energy demand of Artificial intelligence.

== See also ==
- Energy in the United Kingdom
- CRC Energy Efficiency Scheme
- The Green Deal
- Close the Door campaign
- Energy Saving Trust
