= SECR =

SECR or SE&CR may refer to

- South Eastern and Chatham Railway in the United Kingdom
  - the SECR N class locomotive operated on the South Eastern and Chatham Railway
- the South East Central Railway zone in India
- Streamlined Energy and Carbon Reporting, a mandatory form of carbon accounting in the United Kingdom
