= Environmental quality =

Properties and characteristics of the environment as they impinge on living organisms

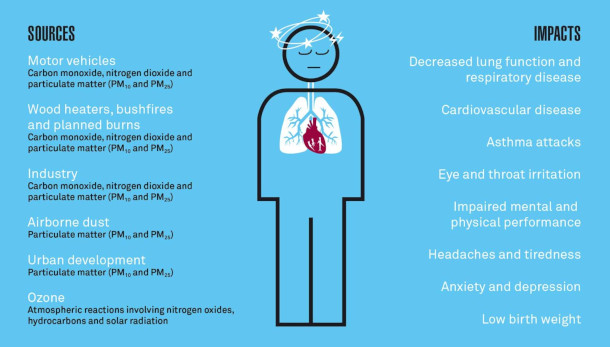
Overview of air pollutants and effects on human health

Environmental quality is a general term that refers to the overall condition of an environment and its impacts on the physical and mental well-being of living organisms. Properties and characteristics of the environment can be assessed at either a general or local level and can include both natural features and built surroundings. Environmental quality assessments of indoor and outdoor environments can examine factors such as air pollution, water pollution, human activities, climate change, and availability of health care.

Environmental quality can be described in terms of both measurable quantitative components and standards, and more subjective qualitative assessments of perceptions and values. The term may be used in different ways depending on location, context, and time. "Overall environmental quality" often refers to broadly measured environmental quality on a national level, while "living environment quality" refers to environmental quality as experienced by the individuals living in it. In the United States, environmental quality is measured in terms of the Environmental Quality Index (EQI). Other countries may measure environmental quality in different ways.

== Environmental quality assessment by country ==
Different countries measure environmental quality in different ways and may set standards for specific areas. In the United States, environmental quality is measured in terms of the Environmental Quality Index (EQI), a combined measure based on five domains: air, water, land, sociodemographic and built environments. A related metric, the Environmental Performance Index (EPI), was developed at Yale and Columbia University and is used globally to measure countries in terms of governmental actions taken to address climate change and to improve both environmental quality and ecosystem vitality (EV).

Internationally, the third and sixth global Sustainable Development Goals (SDGs) focus on the environment and health. The European Union does not define a combined quality index but does set and measure separate "Environmental quality standards" (EQS) for air and for water. In China, researchers have developed a number of models using remote sensing to assess "Eco-environmental quality" in terms of regional characteristics such as biological abundance, vegetation cover, water density, land stress, and pollution levels.

=== United States ===
In the United States, the Environmental Quality Index or EQI quantitatively measures and displays an overview of the area's environmental quality by looking at the water, land, air, built, and sociodemographic features. The EQI was stablished in 2000–2005, and updated in 2006-2010. Measures from these two time periods are not comparable. Researchers and environmentalists use the EQI to find ways in which environmental quality affects the population's health. Ecologists, economists, and others also utilize the EQI. The EQI provides a snapshot of the relationship between the environment's quality and the population's health by measuring multiple environmental features. The EQI can be used in disaster management and resource allocation to find and provide targeted support for problems such as water scarcity, famine, drought, or natural disasters.

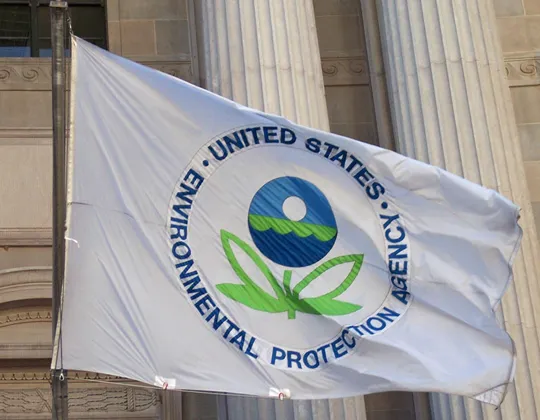
Logo of the EPA on a flag

In the United States, environmental quality is applied as a body of federal and state standards and regulations monitored by regulatory agencies. All states in the US have a form of department or commission that is responsible for a variety of activities, such as monitoring quality, responding to citizen complaints, and enforcing environmental regulations. The agency with the lead implementation responsibility for most major federal environmental laws (e.g. Clean Air Act, Clean Water Act) is the US Environmental Protection Agency (EPA). Other federal agencies with significant oversight roles include the Council on Environmental Quality, the Department of the Interior, and the Army Corps of Engineers.

==== Environmental Protection Agency (EPA) ====
The Environmental Protection Agency is a United States agency ensuring the safety and upkeep of the environment and human health. To meet their purpose, the EPA develops regulations. The EPA donates money and gives grants to federal programs that aid the environment. The money then goes towards environmental studies, cleanups, research, and nonprofits. The EPA has many labs in the US used to study, identify, and solve environmental issues. Some of these labs include the Office of Air and Radiation, Chicago Regional Laboratory, Manchester's Environmental Laboratory, and National Vehicle and Fuel Emissions Laboratory.

==== US environmental footprint ====
Scientists have predicted the US population will increase to 364 million by 2060. To visualize the impacts this population boom will have on the environment, if all people continue to consume at the same pace and amount the average American does, humanity will need five Earths to continue at their pace. There has been a substantial increase in the consumption of the American diet, including fats, sugars, total calories, and sodium over the past 40 years. With this, there has also been an increase in food waste; on average, Americans waste up to 50% more food than the average American in 1970.

The US's water intake has decreased by 9% compared to 2010. The most common uses of water are seen in thermoelectric power, irrigation, and public supply.

As of 2000, the average material consumption was 52% more than Europeans: 23.7 tons. Since 1900, this average has increased by 21.7 tons per person. The average American produced 4.9 pounds of waste daily in 2018. The same year, 94 million tons of waste were recycled or composted rather than being sent to landfills, twice as much as in 1990.

=== United Kingdom ===
In the United Kingdom, the environment has been the primary responsibility of the Department for Environment, Food and Rural Affairs (DEFRA). Predecessor bodies were merged in 2001 to create this department with a broader remit to link rural activities to the natural environment. Some responsibilities have been devolved and are now exercised by the Scottish Environment Protection Agency (SEPA) of the Scottish Government and the Senedd Cymru (Welsh Parliament). Delivery of environmental initiatives often use partners, including British Waterways, Environment Agency, Broads Authority, Forestry Commission, and Natural England. DEFRA also has a remit to oversee the impacts of activities within the built environment and the United Kingdom Climate Change Programme.

The UK implemented the UK Environment Act in 2021. The act is the UK's basis for improved environmental protection and regulation. The act establishes the Office of Environmental Protection (OEP) as a "watchdog" holding the government and other agencies accountable.

==== England ====
England's number one health risk is air pollution. It has been found that the level of air pollution in England has decreased the life expectancy of many people. A decline in mental health is seen to be affected by air pollution, climate change, and flooding. Distribution to green spaces across England is not equal. The population with areas of low green space have poorer quality environments, increased healthcare bills, and higher economic activity than those with high areas of green space.

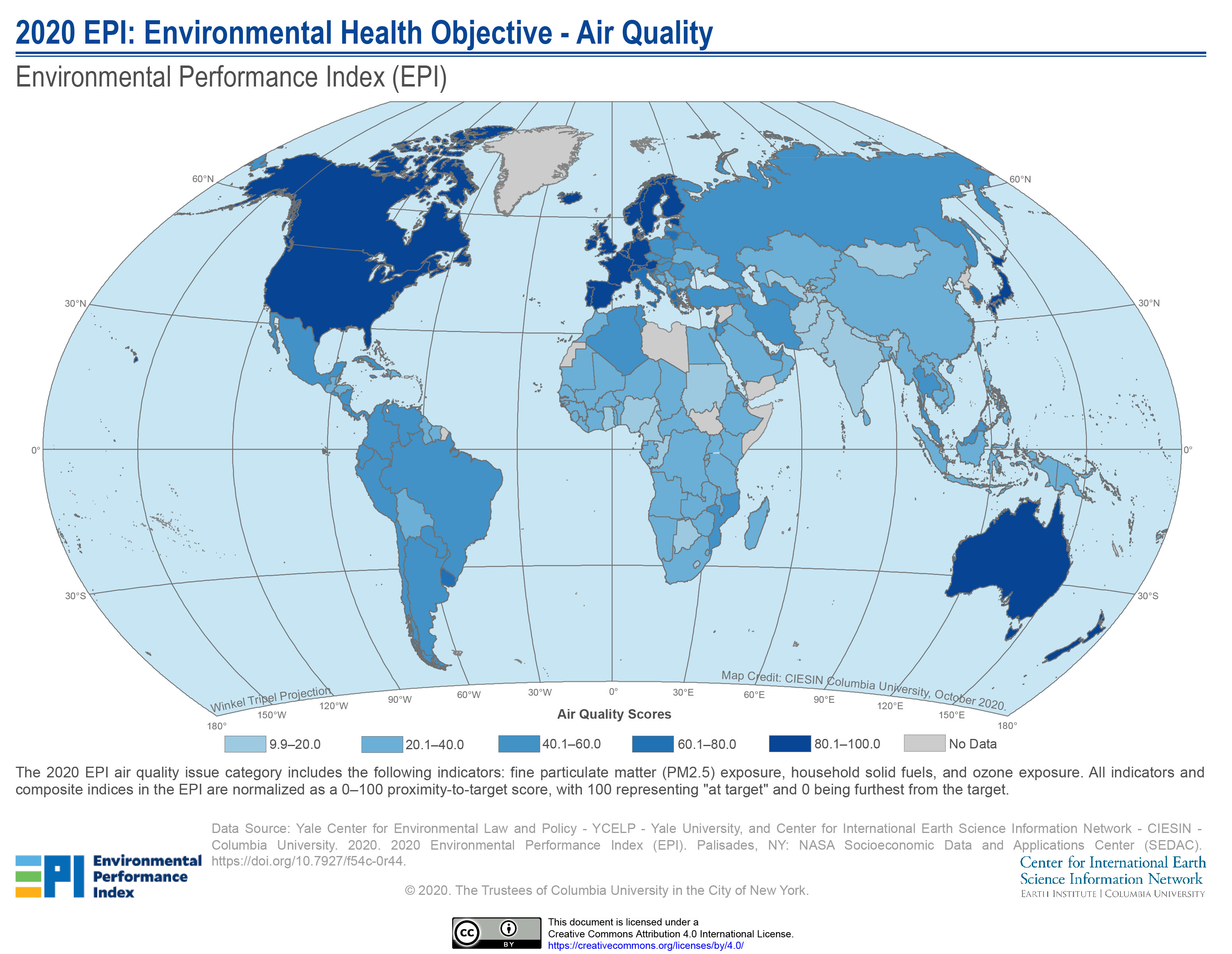
2020 EPI Environmental Health Objective – Air Quality (50638287888)

England introduced regulations to increase green and blue space in areas with high urbanization and industrialization. By doing this, it will improve the economy by giving people the opportunity to hire into new jobs, while also benefiting the people of that area's health.

== Social factors affecting environmental quality ==
=== Policy and regulation ===
Governments have set regulations and policies on the environment; however, there are often two reasons for doing so. When producers or company owners set policies and regulations on their environment, it is to help their company. Oftentimes, regulations will be set to benefit the producers and, in turn, harm the environment. The other reason for setting regulations or policies on the environment is to help conserve environmental quality and prevent climate change from worsening. Environmentalists will push for regulations and policies to be implemented to benefit the environment. However, this will often hurt the economy that benefits from extracting from the environment. Finding ways to compromise is difficult but not impossible.

=== Population ===
Human health and lifestyle are primarily affected by a population's environment. Typically, areas with poverty or poor lifestyles correlate with poor environmental quality. According to a research study done by Fothergill, Peek, and Greenberg, families living in poverty or low-income areas are more vulnerable than high-income families to waste or toxic materials, leading to health and lifestyle issues. There is more exposure to pollution, and no intent to reverse the environmental damage in these areas. Because these areas are impoverished, they do not have the means to work on helping the environment. Because environmental quality is not prioritized, the environmental quality grows worse.

People living in poor environmental quality are more susceptible to environmental disasters. Once affected, rebuilding can be difficult if an area is short of the financial means to repair the damage. Factors such as poor air quality, poor water quality, water scarcity, poor waste management, and vulnerability to disasters lead these areas into poverty and further harm the environment.

With the increase in world population, the environment is struggling to keep up with the production of natural resources that sustain human life. The more a population demands from the environment, the poorer the quality of the environment will be. Population growth has many environmental effects, including deforestation, pollution (air, water, and solid waste), and water scarcity.

Urbanization has been a large part of the environment's degrading quality. Urbanization has led to habitat loss, deforestation, local extinctions, and higher ambient temperatures, also known as the urban heat island effect. These effects can be avoided with proper urban planning and sustainable efforts.

=== Urbanization ===
Urbanization leads to many environmental issues, including: air pollution from road traffic, deforestation, water contamination from aged pipes and litter, and unsustainable habits. All these effects lead to a decrease in environmental quality. However, solving the problem of poor environmental quality due to urbanization is difficult. Many factors cause poor environmental quality, and being able to stop or even prevent them is difficult. With these numerous factors, no one stands out, and preventing this specific factor from happening would not completely solve the issue of poor environmental quality.

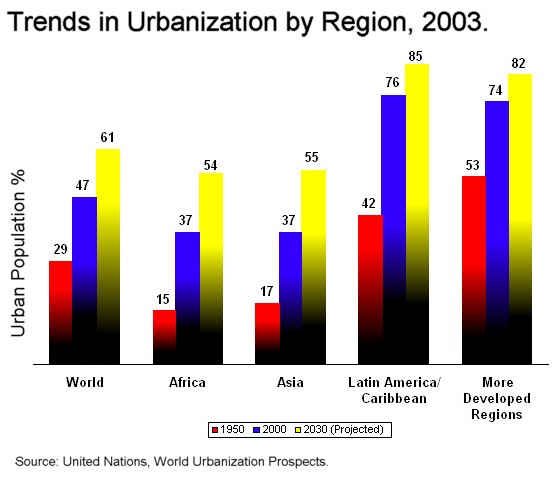
Urbanization by region

Population growth and urbanization pressure natural resources and systems. When more of a resource is used than is replenished, it will decline in amount and become limited. Limited resources are most commonly found in areas with high population and low supply.

=== Technology ===
Areas with advanced technology are found to recover quicker from natural disasters, prevent disastrous harm to the environment, and find ways to avoid the effects of degrading environmental quality before they begin. If technology develops at any population density, there will be an increased quality of the environment.

Technology has positive and negative effects on the environment. Technology took off with the Industrial Revolution, revolutionizing the way America produced certain goods; however, this technological revolution led to an increase in the amount of damage done to the environment. Today, there is still technology that harms the environment. For example, gasoline-powered vehicles emit carbon dioxide, which worsens the greenhouse effect in Earth's atmosphere. Coal-powered factories create pollution and use high amounts of energy to create a product.

However, there are technological advances that have not negatively impacted the environment as much. For example, the development of electric vehicles has decreased the use of gasoline. Communication technology such as video calling allows people to work from home and limit vehicle transportation.

Technology that does not leave an effect, or a minimal effect, on the environment can be expensive and difficult to implement in large quantities, which is why this technology is minimally implemented.

=== Economic development ===
There are multiple factors taking effect on the relationship between environmental quality and income, making it difficult to predict and read. For example, factors like technology, different economic structures, and the intent for change can vary the outcome. Different types of areas with high income, and what they do with the area, greatly affect the environment. Some areas may pay to build factories that emit large amounts of pollution. Some high-income areas account for environmental quality and use their economic standing to help create a better environment. Some areas with high income already begin with a higher level of forestation, leading to a slower deforestation rate compared to low-income areas starting with low forestation.

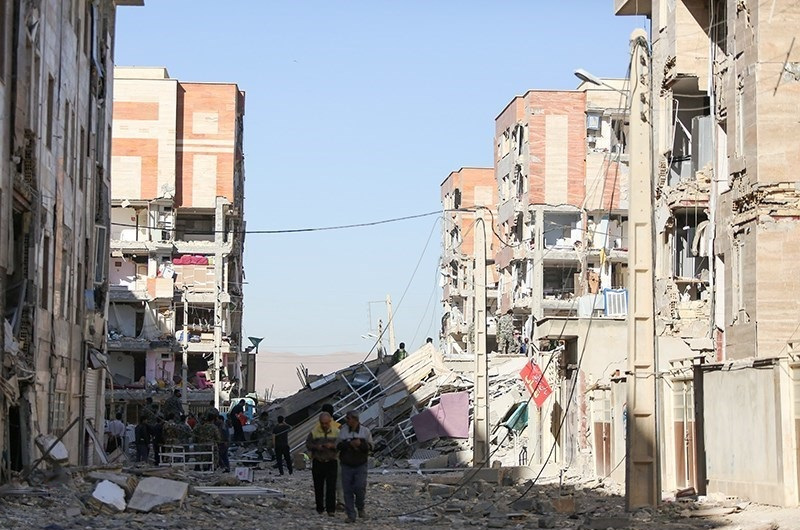
2017 Kermanshah earthquake by Alireza Vasigh Ansari – Sarpol-e Zahab (15)

Some income is so low that there is no room to industrialize or create machinery that will pollute the environment. On the other hand, low-income areas may not have the means to prepare or rebuild after a natural disaster. With the rise of climate change, natural disasters are becoming worse and causing more damage.

== See also ==
- Environmental impact assessment
- Environmental law
- Council on Environmental Quality
- United States Environmental Protection Agency
- United States Department of the Interior
