= The Green Deal =

British government initiative

The Green Deal was a UK government policy initiative that gave homeowners, landlords and tenants the opportunity to pay for energy efficient home improvements through the savings on their energy bills from 2012 to 2015. At the heart of the Green Deal was the rule that savings on bills would exceed the cost of the work. By meeting this 'Golden Rule', consumers were able to receive energy savings without direct cost. Consumers then paid back the cost of such improvements through the expected savings in their energy bills. However, there is no guarantee that the eventual savings made by consumers will match the cost of the loans they take out to make the improvements and industry bodies recognised there was a risk consumers could end up out of pocket.

There were 45 different types of improvements available under the Green Deal, ranging from loft and cavity wall insulation, innovative hot water systems and condensing boilers to more costly measures such as solar thermal energy or solid wall insulation.

This was a unique financial structure with no debtor, instead the burden stayed with the property no matter the tenant. This means new tenants or owners become liable for the payments for the energy efficiency improvements, requiring new legislation in English law.

It was hoped the Green Deal would lead to the renovation of the UK's housing stock with an estimated 14 million homes seeing energy efficiency improvements ranging from; double glazing, cavity wall and loft insulation through to gas and oil boilers, and renewable technologies such as solar PV, solar thermal and heat pumps. Ultimately only 1,754 householders signed up to the scheme and it was discontinued to save taxpayer money

== History ==
It was given a 'soft' launch by the Department of Energy and Climate Change on 1 October 2012 to permit improvements for energy saving measures for properties in Great Britain and was officially launched in January 2013. Following this, the first Green Deal Plans were available from 28 January 2013. The registers of Green Deal Installers, Green Deal Assessors, Green Deal Advisers and Green Deal Providers became active at the launch in October 2012. In its first six months 38,259 Green Deal assessments had taken place. However, only four Green Deals had been taken out.

Green Deals were repaid at a rate no more than 6.92% fixed rate unsecured over the life, up to 25 years. This financing was compared to home loans of similar duration, but had limited periods of fixed rates of 5 years or less, and secured against the house. Surveys found little awareness among the general public for the Green Deal. The perceived high interest rates and charges of the scheme were heavily criticised.

Lack of demand for the Green Deal left the energy efficiency industry struggling, the lack of demand has led one company, Domestic & General Insulation, to completely withdraw from the market and will likely lay off 600 staff.

In 2014 a second Green Deal was launched, as grants rather than the loans which had underpinned the original scheme On 1 May, the Government announced the new Green Deal Home Improvement Fund (GDHIF), a new energy efficiency incentive available to households in England and Wales for taking measures to improve the energy efficiency in their homes. The households will be eligible to claim up to £7,600 for improving their homes. The Incentive went live on 9 June 2014.

The Green Deal was included in the Energy Act 2011 and came into force on 1 October 2012. DECC announced a list of pioneer Green Deal providers in April 2012. Twenty two providers, including three of the biggest six energy companies and B&Q, (the only high street name) have signed a declaration stating they intend to become Green Deal Providers, once DECC had appointed the Green Deal Oversight Body. Other expected providers such as Tesco, Marks and Spencer and the other three major energy companies were missing from the list.

The Department of Energy and Climate Change made the decision in July 2015 following the election of Conservative Government The Energy Secretary Amber Rudd announced the Green Deal would be scrapped. The Department for Energy and Climate Change said it took the decision to protect taxpayers, citing low take-up and concerns about industry standards.

The parliamentary Energy and Climate Change Committee said the Green Deal had "failed to live up to expectations" and that its implementation had been poor stating "Rather than facilitating access to energy efficiency measures and creating momentum in the market, the Green Deal has caused frustration and confusion for both consumers and the supply chain," the MPs said.

Labour said ministers' approach to energy efficiency had been a "failure". There was no opposition to the scheme being scrapped but there was concern that there was no replacement scheme. In total 15,000 Green Deals had been issued. Former Climate Change Minister Greg Barker stated he was confident that the private sector would pick up the slack from the withdrawal of Government funding

== How it worked ==
Homeowners would make energy-saving improvements to their home or business without having to pay all the costs up front through the Green Deal.

First, an assessment was conducted by a government registered assessor of the property to see what improvements could be made and how much it could save on energy bills.

Secondly, the homeowner would choose a Green Deal provider to carry out the work. Only work that would reduce the energy bill highlighted by the assessor would qualify.

Thirdly, a Green Deal plan was signed. This is a contract between the property owner and the provider stating what work will be done and how much it will cost. The provider will then arrange for a Green Deal installer to do the work. The funding for these measures is then issued by The Green Deal Finance Company (GDFC)

Lastly, once the work was complete, the homeowner or tenant would pay off the cost in instalments through their electricity bill.

Gemserv has been contracted as the scheme administrators for the Green Deal Oversight and Registration Body (GD ORB), alongside its role of operating the Microgeneration Certification Scheme(MCS) and the Biomass Suppliers List (BSL). The GD ORB manages scheme administrative functions, such as maintaining the public registers of authorised participants and participant helpdesk; as well as working alongside industry and government to further develop and share best practice in operational processes, and raising awareness about consumer protection issues.

== Improvements covered ==
Initial list of improvement measures available under the Green Deal;

Heating, ventilation and air conditioning

- Condensing boilers
- Heating controls
- Under-floor heating
- Heat recovery systems
- Mechanical ventilation (non-dom)
- Flue gas recovery devices
- Ground source heat pumps
- Air source heat pumps

Building fabric

- Cavity wall insulation
- Loft insulation
- Flat roof insulation
- Internal wall insulation
- External wall insulation
- Draught proofing
- Floor insulation
- Heating system insulation (cylinder, pipes)

Lighting

- Lighting fittings
- Lighting controls

Water Heating

- Innovative hot water systems
- Water efficient taps and showers

Fenestration

- Energy Efficient Glazing and Doors

A further 15 Green Deal measures have been confirmed and include;

- Chillers
- Duct Insulation
- HVAC Controls
- Hot Water Controls
- Hot Water Showers
- Hot Water systems
- Hot Water taps
- Pipework Insulation
- Roof lights, lamps and luminaires
- Radiant heating
- Sealing improvements
- Solar blinds, shutters and shading devices
- Transpired solar collectors
- Variable speed drives for fans and pumps
- Water Source Heat Pumps

== Criticism ==
The Green Deal was criticised by a broad range of groups such as Consumer Focus, Friends of the Earth and the Smith School of Enterprise. These criticisms ranged from a fear that it would increase fuel poverty to concerns over the viability of the bundled loans as securities following the similar financial products that were created from US housing which led to the 2008 financial crisis. The building industry raised concern about the lack of stimulus to drive demand for the uptake of the Green Deal. Other worries included its limited projected coverage to consumer protection, its treatment of non-domestic buildings and lack of competition among suppliers. The Government never implemented the Green Deal for business.

Fears of low take up of the Green Deal led Government to budget £200 million to encourage early uptake. The policy caused a rift in the Coalition Government in April 2012. Senior Conservative ministers, including Eric Pickles ( Communities and Local Government Secretary), called for the scheme to be scrapped as it could cost the so-called "squeezed" middle, thousands of pounds.

The building industry raised concern about the lack of stimulus to drive demand for the uptake of the Green Deal. Other worries included its limited projected coverage to consumer protection, its treatment of non-domestic buildings and lack of competition among suppliers.

There had also been doubts cast over whether the central tenet of the scheme - the so-called "Golden Rule" whereby the cost of repayments never outweighs the savings on the bill - would actually be successfully implemented. There was also criticism that it would only benefit the middle class and not be of any help to those most in need and the working class. The Green Deal was also criticised by the Citizens Advice Bureau for its lack of protection for consumers, particularly those inheriting a Green Deal when taking over a property The policy was also been criticised by senior Conservative MPs, when it was revealed that for any work on a property to get planning permission it would also be forced to take on a Green Deal. This was dubbed a 'conservatory tax' by the media. Consumer Focus also raised concerns about the lack of consumer redress, particularly for those who inherit a Green Deal.

The quality of the assessments was also called into doubt. A 2-day course is all that is required to become an assessor, with many assessors relying on a software package to make recommendations rather than any expert knowledge.

The then Prime MinisterDavid Cameron defended the Green Deal, stating that despite the lack of interest from the general public and a slow take-up, the policy was never intended to start with a big bang, but rather to build slowly. Nevertheless, the government has invested heavily in generating early uptake by consumers.

There were also issues with conmen posing as Green Deal assessors. Trading standards officers reported that cold callers were posing as Green Deal assessors while charging "administration fees".

=== Fuel poverty ===
The scheme has faced heavy criticism that it will do nothing to combat the rising levels of fuel poverty in the UK. The Government's impact assessment estimates that the Green Deal will lead to 125,000 to 250,000 households being lifted out of fuel poverty by 2023. But that's nowhere near enough, according to Michelle Mitchell, charity director general at Age UK. "The Government's target of lifting just 250,000 households out of fuel poverty over the next 10 years is tantamount to trying to bail out a sinking boat with a teacup; in the last month alone another 300,000 households have joined the ranks of the fuel poor," she pointed out.

=== Interest rate ===
The 7% interest rate of the Green Deal Plan has been extensively criticized since it was revealed at the scheme's launch, as it is higher than available high street home-loans. Although the Green Deal Plan was a fixed rate for the life of the energy improvement (up to 25 years) and unsecured, it was compared to secured home loans of similar life but only short periods of fixed interest rate. This led to some Green Deal providers such as Npower raising concerns about the high rates, adding that, unless they were reduced, the scheme would fail. The high interest rate also raised concerns that the Green Deal would not meet its golden rule.

Experts suggest that in order to attract investors, the Green Deal may need to be altered, compromising its original objective. The range of investors it had been assumed would underpin the Green Deal would require returns of 11%-15%, thus there is a 4-8 percentage point shortfall between what is needed to make the Green Deal attractive to investors and what the Government has set as the loan interest rate.

=== Mortgageability questions ===
Questions were raised over the impact on the mortgageability of properties with Green Deal debts tied to them and if this debt would need to be cleared before banks and other mortgage providers would provide a mortgage on such a property.

One potential outcome appears to be not achieving the stated energy cost savings, paying more than necessary for the changes via a limited pool of providers, financed by an uncompetitive loan, that subsequently renders the property difficult or impossible to sell or remortgage. Buro Happold, in a report on the Green Deal, suggested there should also be more information on its wider implications, such as how it impacts fuel poverty, property value and re-saleability. The researchers also warn that the as yet unknown impact on the resale value of homes from refurbishments and Green Deal debts attached to the property could deter uptake.

Government guidance stated - If you move into a property with a Green Deal, the landlord or seller must show you a copy of the Energy Performance Certificate - this will explain what improvements have been made and how much you’ll need to repay. The person who pays the electricity bill pays the money back - so if you’re a tenant in a rented property, you’ll be paying back the costs, not the landlord. This is because the tenant can expect to benefit from lower energy costs.

Buro Happold, in a report on the Green Deal, suggested there should also be more information on its wider implications, such as how it impacts fuel poverty, property value and re-saleability. The researchers also warn that the as yet unknown impact on the resale value of homes from refurbishments and Green Deal debts attached to the property could deter uptake.

=== Risk of overheating ===
Research studies by Prof Chris Goodier of Loughborough University and Prof Li Shao of the University of Reading indicate risks of overheating in dwellings to which Green Deal improvements have been made. The risk of overheating has been overlooked in the "big rush to insulate and make homes airtight" in order to protect against the cold in winter. This is a particular problem as more extreme weather, including heatwaves, is being predicted for the UK by meteorologists. This would be most likely to affect elderly or otherwise vulnerable residents living in urban areas in "top floor flats in 1960s tower blocks, and modern detached houses ... particularly if they were south facing."

=== Accuracy and consistency of assessments ===
Research for DECC, by Heriot-Watt University's Urban Energy Research Group, suggested concerns over the reliability of Green Deal Energy Assessments, particularly when using such assessments for structuring loan repayments around predicted energy savings. The consistency of these assessments, and more general concerns with using an EPC-related energy assessment process in this way, was overviewed in the commissioned DECC report and follow-up research article.

== Energy Company Obligation (ECO) ==
The Department of Energy and Climate Change (DECC) wants energy companies to make improvements to some homes at no upfront cost to the consumer.

The scheme is funded by energy suppliers with the aim of increasing energy efficiency and decreasing household energy bills in the UK.

The Energy Company Obligation (ECO) helps with unregulated homes. ECO will be funded by the energy suppliers and they look to implement measures worth around £1.3 billion every year. This cost will be passed onto all consumers through their energy bills.

Where the cost of the work outweighs the savings, or people need that financial help, energy suppliers may be able to top-up finance for the works. The ECO takes over from existing obligations such as CERT, CESP and the Warm Front.

== The Green Deal Home Improvement Fund ==
The Green Deal Home Improvement Fund (GDHIF) is a new incentive scheme open to all householders in England and Wales wanting to improve the energy efficiency of their homes.

The scheme allows Householders to choose one or both of the two core offers available and may also be eligible to claim up to £7,600 as a bundled package. The policy closed to new applications on 24 July 2014.

Core offer 1

Up to £1,000 for installing two energy saving improvements from the list of 12 eligible measures below:

1. Condensing mains gas boiler
2. Fan assisted storage heaters
3. Flue gas heat recovery
4. Replacement warm-air unit
5. Waste water heat recovery
6. Cavity wall insulation
7. Flat roof insulation
8. Floor insulation
9. Room in a roof insulation
10. Double/triple glazing (replacing single glazing)
11. Secondary glazing
12. Energy efficient replacement doors

Core offer 2

Up to 75% of the total cost of the installation of internal or external solid wall insulation, up to a maximum value of £6,000, making this high carbon saving improvement much more affordable.

Core offer 3

Householders can also claim a refund of up to £100 for a Green Deal Assessment Report (GDAR) that is less than 24 months old when they do work in this scheme.

Core offer 4

An additional bonus of up to £500 for homebuyers who have bought a home in the last 12 months prior to application.

Requirements

To be eligible for the GDHIF scheme offers householders must satisfy the following incentive criteria:

- Customers must apply for the voucher before the work starts
- Measures must be recommended in an Energy Performance Certificate (EPC) or GDAR carried out in the last 24 months
- The GDHIF can work with Green Deal Finance which could be used to help to pay for some of the costs of installation
- Customers will not be eligible for the GDHIF incentive if they receive ECO or other central Government funding, on the energy saving improvements applied for under GDHIF

This scheme closed on 24 July, due to overwhelming demand. In October 2014 however, the Government announced an additional £100m of funding would be made available for the GDHIF phase 2 although further details are yet to be revealed.

== The Green Deal Finance Company ==
The Green Deal Finance Company (TGDFC) was a £14 billion industry led consortium with over 50 members from across the industry, both public and private sector. The Company was incorporated in March 2012 as a not-for-profit mutual limited by guarantee. It is a national aggregator designed to make finance available to all accredited Green Deal Providers on an equal and open basis. By operating at a national level, it intends to minimise the operating and administration costs of Green Deals and will aim to access the cheapest sources of finance in the market at the highest possible credit rating. It worked closely with the Department of Energy and Climate Change (DECC) and the Green Investment Bank, together with a number of Local Authorities, with a view to maximising its assistance to the Green Deal market.

== See also ==
- CRC Energy Efficiency Scheme
- Climate Change Agreement
- Capital allowance
- Energy policy of the United Kingdom
- Energy use and conservation in the United Kingdom
- Renewable Heat Incentive
- Renewables Obligation
- United Kingdom Climate Change Programme
- Feed-in tariffs in the United Kingdom
- Energy Company Obligation
