= Climate Change Levy =

Tax levied on energy delivered to non-domestic users in the United Kingdom

The Climate Change Levy (CCL) is a tax on energy delivered to non-domestic users in the United Kingdom.

== Scope and purpose ==
Introduced on 1 April 2001 under the Finance Act 2000, it was forecast to cut annual emissions by 2.5 million tonnes by 2010, and forms part of the UK's Climate Change Programme. The levy applies to most energy users, with the notable exceptions of those in the domestic and transport sectors. Electricity from nuclear is taxed even though it causes no direct carbon emissions. Originally electricity generated from new renewables and approved cogeneration schemes was not taxed, but the July 2015 Budget removed this exemption from 1 August 2015, raising £450m/year.

== Rates ==
From when it was introduced, the levy was frozen at 0.43p/kWh on electricity, 0.15p/kWh on coal and 0.15p/kWh on gas.

A reduction of up to 90% from the levy may be gained by energy-intensive users provided they sign a Climate Change Agreement.

Revenue from the levy was offset by a 0.3% employers' rate reduction in National Insurance. However, the Finance Act 2002 subsequently increased that rate by 1%, reversing the reduction. The revenue used to fund a number of energy efficiency initiatives such as The Carbon Trust. However, revenue recycling was removed at the Spending Review 2010, with the revenue going to the Exchequer.

In the 2006 budget it was announced that the levy would in future rise annually in line with inflation, starting from 1 April 2007. In the 2018 Budget, it was announced that the rates of the Climate Change Levy would be adjusted until 2022 so that the gas rate reaches 60% of the electricity rate in 2021 to 2022.

Rates have changed as tabulated below.

Rates from 1 April 2013
Fuel type	Rate
Electricity	0.541 p/kWh
Gas	0.188 p/kWh
LPG	1.21 p/kg
Any other "taxable commodity"	1.429 p/kg

Rates from 1 April 2019
Fuel type	Rate
Electricity	0.847 p/kWh
Gas	0.339 p/kWh
LPG	2.175 p/kg
Any other "taxable commodity"	2.653 p/kg

Rates from 1 April 2020
Fuel type	Rate
Electricity	0.811 p/kWh
Gas	0.406 p/kWh
LPG	2.175 p/kg
Any other "taxable commodity"	3.174 p/kg

== See also ==
- Climate change in the United Kingdom
- Environmental tax
- Energy policy of the United Kingdom
- Energy in the United Kingdom
- Renewables Obligation (United Kingdom)
