= Water supply and sanitation in London =

Water supply and sanitation in London is provided by private companies. The regional water strategy for London is produced by the Greater London Authority. Much of the water supply and sewerage system was constructed during the Victorian era (1837-1901), in light of repeated cholera outbreaks. Greater London is located within the Thames River Basin District.

== Water supply ==
Water supply by population
1. Thames 76 (75.2%)
2. Affinity 14 (13.9%)
3. Essex and Suffolk 7 (6.93%)
4. SES Water 4 (3.96%)

London has well developed water supply infrastructure. Most drinking water consumed in London comes from the River Thames and the River Lee. Approximately 70% of all water supplied to London is taken from the Thames upstream of Teddington Weir.

Greater London is currently supplied by four companies: Thames Water (76% of population), Affinity Water (14%), Essex and Suffolk Water (7%) and SES Water (4%).

== Sewerage ==
All of Greater London is within the Thames River Basin District. The London sewerage system is operated by Thames Water and serves almost all of London, except for a small area where Anglian Water provides sewerage services.
