= Music Declares Emergency =

Environmental pressure group

Music Declares Emergency (MDE) is an environmental pressure group with no commercial or political affiliations whose purpose is to create a vehicle for musicians and the music industry to bring their influence to bear on climate breakdown mitigation.

MDE was launched in July 2019, by a working group of UK musicians and music industry executives in conjunction with Julie's Bicycle, a non-profit environmental charity for the creative industries. Signatories to its declaration of intent include artists across pop, classical and folk genres as well as organisations such as Abbey Road Studios, Universal Music, Warner Music and Sony.

Its stated aims are to encourage the music industry to innovate new practices to reduce, and ultimately remove, the carbon footprint of the music industry and to work with artists to engage all communities in the debate while calling on the government to target a 2030 date for net-zero emissions.

In 2019, MDE was awarded IMPALA's Outstanding Contribution award. In 2020, MDE was nominated as the charity partner of the Scottish Album of the Year Awards and curated announcements on zero carbon commitments in conjunction with labels Ninja Tune and the Beggars Group.

In 2020, an MDE delegation including Fay Milton (from the band Savages), Edwin Congreave (from the band Foals), Peter Quicke (Co-CEO Ninja Tune) and Alison Tickell (CEO of Julie's Bicycle) met with Frans Timmermans, Vice-President of the European Commission, to discuss the role that music can play in supporting the EU Green Deal and contribute to Europe's green recovery strategy.^{[6]}

In 2020, singer Billie Eilish signified her support by wearing and projecting their slogan, 'No Music on a Dead Planet', during her global live stream event.

In 2021 it collaborated in the launch of EarthPercent with the aim of raising funding from the industry itself to subsidise organisations working on the climate emergency, including those focused on the music industry.

Around Earth Day on 22 April 2021, composer Errollyn Wallen launched MDE's 'Turn Up The Volume' campaign on BBC Radio 4's Loose Ends, a series of interviews and seminars which involved artists such as Melanie C, Declan McKenna, Peter Hook and Annie Mac.

Active MDE groups exist in Germany, France, Switzerland, Chile, Canada, and the USA.

== See also ==
- Climate emergency declaration
