= Climate emergency declarations in the United Kingdom =

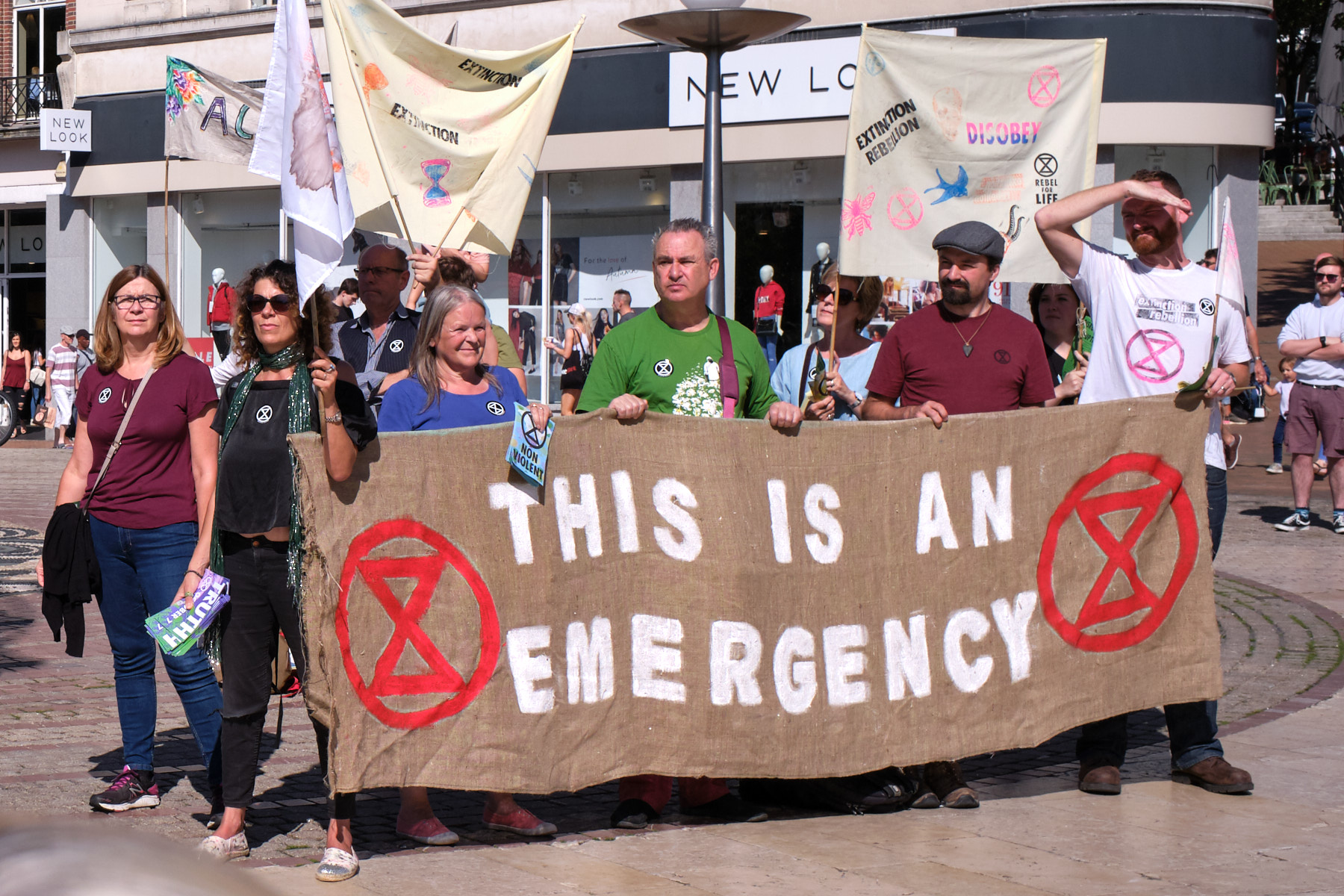
Extinction Rebellion Redeclaration, Bournemouth Square, 14 September 2019

Climate emergency declarations have been made by multiple jurisdictions in the United Kingdom, including city, county, and borough councils. Bills to declare a climate emergency have also been introduced in several other jurisdictions.

== National ==
In May 2019, the Parliament of the United Kingdom approved a motion to declare a climate emergency, becoming the first national Parliament to do so. The motion was tabled by then-Leader of the Opposition Jeremy Corbyn, and passed without a division with bilateral support, although it was not supported by ministers.

== Devolved jurisdictions ==
Devolved jurisdictions that have declared a climate emergency
Parliament	Declared a climate emergency	Date
Gibraltar Parliament	Yes	3 May 2019
Isle of Man	Yes	18 June 2019
Jersey	Yes	2 May 2019
Northern Ireland Assembly	Yes	3 February 2020
Scottish Parliament	Yes	28 April 2019
Senedd	Yes	29 April 2019

== England ==
=== County councils ===
England county councils that have declared a climate emergency
County council	Declared a climate emergency	Date
Buckinghamshire County Council	Yes	26 September 2019
Cambridgeshire County Council	Yes	14 May 2019
Cumbria County Council	No	
Derbyshire County Council	No	
Devon County Council	Yes	21 February 2019
East Sussex County Council	Yes	15 October 2019
Essex County Council	No	
Gloucestershire County Council	Yes	15 May 2019
Hampshire County Council	Yes	17 June 2019
Hertfordshire County Council	Yes	16 July 2019
Kent County Council	Yes	23 May 2019
Lancashire County Council	No	
Leicestershire County Council	Yes	15 May 2019
Lincolnshire County Council	No	
Norfolk County Council	No	
North Yorkshire County Council	Yes	5 July 2022
Northamptonshire County Council	Yes	20 June 2019
Nottinghamshire County Council	Yes	27 May 2021
Oxfordshire County Council	Yes	2 April 2019
Somerset County Council	Yes	20 February 2019
Staffordshire County Council	Yes	25 July 2019
Suffolk County Council	Yes	21 March 2019
Surrey County Council	Yes	9 July 2019
Warwickshire County Council	Yes	25 July 2019
West Sussex County Council	Yes	5 April 2019
Worcestershire County Council	Yes	July 2021

=== District councils ===
England district councils that have declared a climate emergency
District Council	Declared a climate emergency	Date
Adur District Council	Yes	18 July 2019
Allerdale Borough Council	Yes	25 September 2019
Amber Valley Borough Council	Yes	24 July 2019
Arun District Council	Yes	13 November 2019
Ashfield District Council	No	N/A
Ashford Borough Council	No	Council voted against declaring a climate emergency on 29 July 2019. However, they have pledged to be carbon neutral by 2030.
Aylesbury Vale District Council	Yes	18 September 2019
Babergh District Council	Yes	23 July 2019
Barrow Borough Council	Yes	16 July 2019
Basildon Borough Council	No	N/A
Basingstoke & Deane Borough Council	Yes	18 July 2019
Bassetlaw District Council	No	Council voted against declaring a climate emergency on 24 June 2021.
Blaby District Council	No	N/A
Bolsover District Council	No	Bolsover Council has debated a climate emergency but have not moved a motion for climate emergency.
Boston Borough Council	Yes	20 January 2020
Braintree District Council	Yes	22 July 2019
Breckland District Council	Yes	19 September 2019
Brentwood Borough Council	Yes	21 June 2023
Broadland District Council	Yes	27 July 2023
Bromsgrove District Council	Yes	24 July 2019
Broxbourne Borough Council	No	
Broxtowe Borough Council	Yes	17 July 2019
Burnley Borough Council	Yes	10 July 2019
Cambridge City Council	Yes	21 February 2019
Cannock Chase District Council	Yes	17 July 2019
Canterbury City Council	Yes	18 July 2019
Carlisle City Council	Yes	5 March 2019
Castle Point Borough Council	No	
Charnwood Borough Council	No	
Chelmsford City Council	Yes	16 July 2019
Cheltenham Borough Council	Yes	9 July 2019
Cherwell District Council	Yes	22 July 2019
Chesterfield Borough Council	Yes	17 July 2019
Chichester District Council	Yes	9 July 2019
Chiltern District Council	Yes	24 July 2019
Chorley Borough Council	Yes	19 November 2019
Colchester Borough Council	Yes	17 July 2019
Copeland Borough Council	No	
Corby Borough Council	Yes	29 August 2019
Cotswold District Council	Yes	3 July 2019
Craven District Council	Yes	6 August 2019
Crawley Borough Council	Yes	17 July 2019
Dacorum Borough Council	Yes	17 July 2019
Dartford Borough Council	Yes	7 October 2019
Daventry District Council	Yes	20 February 2020
Derbyshire Dales District Council	Yes	30 May 2019
Dover District Council	Yes	29 January 2020
East Cambridgeshire District Council	Yes	17 October 2019
East Devon District Council	Yes	24 July 2019
East Hampshire District Council	Yes	18 July 2019
East Hertfordshire District Council	Yes	26 July 2023
East Lindsey District Council	No	
East Northamptonshire District Council	No	
East Staffordshire Borough Council	Yes	17 August 2020
East Suffolk Council	Yes	24 July 2019
Eastbourne Borough Council	Yes	10 July 2019
Eastleigh Borough Council	Yes	18 July 2019
Eden District Council	Yes	11 July 2019
Elmbridge Borough Council	Yes	17 July 2019
Epping Forest District Council	Yes	19 September 2019
Epsom and Ewell Borough Council	Yes	23 July 2019
Erewash Borough Council	Yes	26 October 2023
Exeter City Council	Yes	23 July 2019
Fareham Borough Council	Yes	24 October 2019
Fenland District Council	No	
Folkestone and Hythe District Council	Yes	24 July 2019
Forest of Dean District Council	Yes	6 December 2018
Fylde Borough Council	No	
Gedling Borough Council	Yes	20 November 2019
Gloucester City Council	Yes	11 July 2019
Gosport Borough Council	No	
Gravesham Borough Council	Yes	26 June 2019
Great Yarmouth Borough Council	No	
Guildford Borough Council	Yes	23 July 2019
Hambleton District Council	Yes	14 December 2021
Harborough District Council	Yes	24 June 2019
Harlow District Council	Yes	11 July 2019
Harrogate Borough Council	No	
Hart District Council	Yes	29 April 2021
Hastings Borough Council	Yes	23 March 2020
Havant Borough Council	Yes	20 November 2024
Hertsmere Borough Council	Yes	18 September 2019
High Peak Borough Council	Yes	15 October 2019
Hinckley and Bosworth Borough Council	Yes	16 July 2019
Horsham District Council	Yes	26 June 2019
Huntingdonshire District Council	Yes	22 February 2023
Hyndburn Borough Council	Yes	19 September 2019
Ipswich Borough Council	Yes	9 July 2019
Kettering Borough Council	Yes	24 July 2019
Kings Lynn and West Norfolk Borough Council	Yes	9 September 2021
Lancaster City Council	Yes	30 January 2019
Lewes District Council	Yes	15 July 2019
Lichfield District Council	Yes	21 October 2019
Lincoln City Council	Yes	23 July 2019
Maidstone Borough Council	Yes	10 April 2019
Maldon District Council	Yes	4 February 2021
Malvern Hills District Council	Yes	23 July 2019
Mansfield District Council	Yes	5 March 2019
Melton Borough Council	Yes	17 July 2019
Mendip District Council	Yes	25 February 2019
Mid Devon District Council	Yes	26 June 2019
Mid Suffolk District Council	Yes	25 July 2019
Mid Sussex District Council	No	
Mole Valley District Council	Yes	18 June 2019
North Devon District Council	Yes	24 July 2019
North East Derbyshire District Council	Yes	8 July 2019
North Hertfordshire District Council	Yes	21 May 2019
North Kesteven District Council	Yes	11 July 2019
North Norfolk District Council	Yes	24 April 2019
North West Leicestershire District Council	Yes	25 June 2019
North Warwickshire Borough Council	Yes	22 October 2019
New Forest District Council	Yes	6 October 2021
Newark and Sherwood District Council	Yes	16 July 2019
Newcastle Under Lyme Borough Council	Yes	3 April 2019
Northampton Borough Council	Yes	3 June 2019
Norwich City Council	Yes	29 January 2019
Nuneaton and Bedworth Borough Council	Yes	4 December 2019
Oadby and Wigston Borough Council	No	
Oxford City Council	Yes	28 January 2019
Pendle Borough Council	Yes	11 July 2019
Preston City Council	Yes	18 April 2019
Redditch Borough Council	Yes	23 September 2019
Reigate and Banstead Borough Council	No	
Ribble Valley Borough Council	Yes	14 October 2025
Richmondshire District Council	Yes	23 July 2019
Rochford District Council	Yes	28 June 2023
Rossendale Borough Council	Yes	25 December 2019
Rother District Council	Yes	16 December 2019
Rugby Borough Council	Yes	18 July 2019
Runnymede Borough Council	Yes	17 October 2019
Rushcliffe Borough Council	Yes	7 March 2019
Rushmoor Borough Council	Yes	20 June 2019
Ryedale District Council	Yes	10 October 2019
Scarborough Borough Council	Yes	7 January 2019
Sedgemoor District Council	Yes	20 March 2019
Selby District Council	No	
Sevenoaks District Council	No	
Somerset West and Taunton Council	Yes	21 February 2019
South Buckinghamshire District Council	No	
South Cambridgeshire District Council	Yes	28 November 2019
South Derbyshire District Council	Yes	27 June 2019
South Hams District Council	Yes	25 July 2019
South Holland District Council	No	
South Kesteven District Council	Yes	26 September 2019
South Lakeland District Council	Yes	26 February 2019
South Norfolk District Council	No	
South Northamptonshire District Council	No	
South Oxfordshire District Council	Yes	11 April 2019
South Ribble Borough Council	Yes	24 July 2019
South Somerset District Council	Yes	21 May 2019
South Staffordshire District Council	Yes	10 September 2019
Spelthorne Borough Council	Yes	14 October 2020
St Albans City Council	Yes	9 July 2019
Stafford Borough Council	Yes	23 July 2019
Staffordshire Moorlands District Council	Yes	10 July 2019
Stevenage Borough Council	Yes	12 June 2019
Stratford-upon-Avon District Council	Yes	30 July 2019
Stroud District Council	Yes	13 December 2018
Surrey Heath Borough Council	Yes	9 October 2019
Swale Borough Council	Yes	26 June 2019
Tamworth Borough Council	Yes	19 November 2019
Tandridge District Council	Yes	13 February 2020
Teignbridge District Council	Yes	18 April 2019
Tendring District Council	Yes	6 August 2019
Test Valley Borough Council	Yes	4 September 2019
Tewkesbury Borough Council	Yes	1 October 2019
Thanet District Council	Yes	11 July 2019
Three Rivers District Council	Yes	21 May 2019
Tonbridge & Malling Borough Council	Yes	9 July 2019
Torridge District Council	Yes	1 July 2019
Tunbridge Wells Borough Council	Yes	17 July 2019
Uttlesford District Council	Yes	30 July 2019
Vale of White Horse District Council	Yes	13 February 2019
Warwick District Council	Yes	26 June 2019
Watford Borough Council	Yes	9 July 2019
Waverley Borough Council	Yes	18 September 2019
Wealden District Council	Yes	24 July 2019
Wellingborough Borough Council	No	
Welwyn Hatfield Borough Council	Yes	19 June 2019
West Devon District Council	Yes	21 May 2019
West Lancashire District Council	Yes	17 July 2019
West Lindsey District Council	No	
West Oxfordshire District Council	Yes	26 June 2019
West Suffolk Council	Yes	11 September 2019
Winchester City Council	Yes	5 June 2019
Woking Borough Council	Yes	25 July 2019
Worcester City Council	Yes	16 July 2019
Worthing Borough Council	Yes	18 July 2019
Wychavon District Council	No	
Wycombe District Council	Yes	3 February 2020
Wyre Borough Council	Yes	11 July 2019
Wyre Forest District Council	Yes	22 May 2019

=== London boroughs ===
There are thirty three London borough authorities, there are only three of these London Borough authorities that have not declared a climate emergency. This means that 91% of London Boroughs have declared a climate emergency. The below table contains data of climate emergency declarations that has been obtained through CEDAMIA and edited to include jurisdictions that have not declared a climate emergency.

London boroughs that have declared a climate emergency
London borough	Declared a climate emergency	Date
Barking and Dagenham Council	Yes	29 January 2020
Barnet London Borough Council	Yes	24 May 2022
Bexley London Borough Council	No	
Brent London Borough Council	Yes	8 July 2019
Bromley London Borough Council	No	
Camden London Borough Council	Yes	9 April 2019
City of London Corporation	No	
Croydon London Borough Council	Yes	15 July 2019
Ealing London Borough Council	Yes	2 April 2019
Enfield London Borough Council	Yes	8 July 2019
Greenwich London Borough Council	Yes	26 June 2019
Hackney London Borough Council	Yes	26 June 2019
Hammersmith and Fulham London Borough Council	Yes	17 July 2019
Haringey London Borough Council	Yes	18 March 2019
Harrow London Borough Council	Yes	18 July 2019
Havering London Borough Council	Yes	22 March 2023
Hillingdon London Borough Council	Yes	16 January 2020
Hounslow London Borough Council	Yes	19 June 2019
Islington London Borough Council	Yes	27 June 2019
Kensington and Chelsea London Borough Council	Yes	22 January 2019
Kingston upon Thames London Borough Council	Yes	25 June 2019
Lambeth London Borough Council	Yes	29 January 2019
Lewisham London Borough Council	Yes	27 February 2019
Merton London Borough Council	Yes	10 July 2019
Newham London Borough Council	Yes	15 April 2019
Redbridge London Borough Council	Yes	20 June 2019
Richmond upon Thames London Borough Council	Yes	9 July 2019
Southwark London Borough Council	Yes	25 March 2019
Sutton London Borough Council	Yes	22 July 2019
Tower Hamlets London Borough Council	Yes	20 March 2019
Waltham Forest London Borough Council	Yes	25 April 2019
Wandsworth London Borough Council	Yes	17 July 2019
Westminster London Borough Council	Yes	18 September 2019

=== Metropolitan districts ===
England metropolitan districts that have declared a climate emergency
Metropolitan district	Declared	Date
Barnsley Metropolitan Borough Council	Yes	18 September 2019
Birmingham City Council	Yes	11 June 2019
Bolton Metropolitan Borough Council	Yes	29 August 2019
Bradford City Council	Yes	15 January 2019
Bury Borough Council	Yes	10 July 2019
Calderdale Borough Council	Yes	30 January 2019
Coventry City Council	Yes	18 June 2019
Doncaster Borough Council	Yes	19 September 2019
Dudley Borough Council	Yes	6 July 2020
Gateshead Borough Council	Yes	23 May 2019
Kirklees Borough Council	Yes	16 January 2019
Knowsley Borough Council	Yes	29 January 2020
Leeds City Council	Yes	27 March 2019
Liverpool City Council	Yes	17 July 2019
Manchester City Council	Yes	10 July 2019
North Tyneside Borough Council	Yes	25 July 2019
Newcastle Upon Tyne City Council	Yes	3 April 2019
Oldham Borough Council	Yes	11 September 2019
Rochdale Borough Council	Yes	17 July 2019
Rotherham Borough Council	Yes	30 October 2019
South Tyneside Borough Council	Yes	19 July 2019
Salford City Council	Yes	17 July 2019
Sandwell Borough Council	Yes	10 March 2020
Sefton Borough Council	Yes	18 July 2019
Sheffield City Council	Yes	18 November 2019
Solihull Borough Council	Yes	8 October 2019
St Helens Borough Council	Yes	10 July 2019
Stockport Borough Council	Yes	28 March 2019
Sunderland City Council	Yes	27 March 2019
Tameside Metropolitan Borough Council	Yes	25 February 2020
Trafford Borough Council	Yes	28 November 2018
Wakefield City Council	Yes	23 May 2019
Walsall Borough Council	Yes	16 September 2019
Wigan Borough Council	Yes	17 July 2019
Wirral Borough Council	Yes	15 July 2019
Wolverhampton City Council	Yes	17 July 2019

=== Unitary authorities ===
England unitary authorities that have declared a climate emergency
Unitary authority	Declared a climate emergency	Date
Bath and North East Somerset Council	Yes	14 March 2019
Bedford Borough Council	Yes	5 March 2019
Blackburn with Darwen Borough Council	Yes	18 July 2019
Blackpool Council	Yes	26 June 2019
Bournemouth, Christchurch and Poole Council	Yes	16 July 2019
Bracknell Forest Borough Council	Yes	11 January 2023
Brighton and Hove City Council	Yes	13 December 2018
Bristol City Council	Yes	13 November 2018
Central Bedfordshire Council	No	
Cheshire East Council	Yes	22 May 2019
Cheshire West and Chester Council	Yes	21 May 2019
Cornwall Council	Yes	22 January 2019
Durham County Council	Yes	20 February 2019 (undeclared on 16 July 2025)
Darlington Borough Council	Yes	18 July 2019
Dorset Council	Yes	16 May 2019
East Riding of Yorkshire Council	Yes	24 February 2021
Greater London Authority	Yes	11 December 2018
Halton Borough Council	Yes	16 October 2019
Hartlepool Borough Council	No	
Herefordshire Council	Yes	8 March 2019
Hull City Council	Yes	21 March 2019
Isle of Wight Council	Yes	24 July 2019
Leicester City Council	Yes	1 February 2019
Luton Borough Council	Yes	13 January 2020
Medway Council	Yes	25 April 2019
Middlesbrough Borough Council	No	
Milton Keynes Council	Yes	23 January 2019
North East Lincolnshire Council	Yes	19 September 2019
North Lincolnshire Council	No	
North Somerset Council	Yes	19 February 2019
Northumberland County Council	Yes	11 June 2019
Nottingham City Council	Yes	13 January 2020
Peterborough City Council	Yes	24 July 2019
Plymouth City Council	Yes	18 March 2019
Portsmouth City Council	Yes	19 March 2019
Reading Borough Council	Yes	26 February 2019
Redcar and Cleveland Borough Council	Yes	28 March 2019
Rutland County Council	Yes	11 January 2021
Shropshire Council	Yes	16 May 2019
Slough Borough Council	Yes	23 July 2019
Southampton City Council	Yes	18 September 2019
Southend-on-Sea Borough Council	Yes	18 July 2019
South Gloucestershire Council	Yes	17 July 2019
Stockton-on-Tees Borough Council	No	
Stoke-on-Trent City Council	Yes	4 July 2019
Swindon Borough Council	Yes	16 July 2022
Telford and Wrekin Borough Council	Yes	25 July 2019
Thurrock Council	Yes	23 October 2019
Torbay Council	Yes	19 June 2019
Warrington Borough Council	Yes	17 June 2019
Wiltshire Council	Yes	26 February 2019
Windsor and Maidenhead Borough Council	Yes	26 June 2019
Wokingham Borough Council	Yes	18 July 2019
City of York Council	Yes	21 March 2019

== Northern Ireland ==
Northern Ireland local government areas that have declared a climate emergency
Local government area	Declared a climate emergency	Date
Antrim and Newtownabbey Borough Council	No	
Ards and North Down Borough Council	Yes	27 February 2019
Armagh City, Banbridge and Craigavon Borough Council	No	
Belfast City Council	Yes	On 1 October 2019 Belfast City Council became the third council in Northern Ireland to declare a climate emergency
Causeway Coast and Glens Borough Council	Yes	8th June 2020
Derry City and Strabane District Council	Yes	27 June 2019
Fermanagh and Omagh District Council	Yes	2 July 2019
Lisburn and Castlereagh City Council	Yes	September 2021
Mid and East Antrim Borough Council	No	
Mid Ulster District Council	No	
Newry, Mourne and Down District Council	Yes	7 October 2019

== Scotland ==
Scottish local government areas that have declared a climate emergency
Local government area	Declared a climate emergency	Date
Aberdeen City Council	Yes	27 March 2023
Aberdeenshire Council	No	Council voted against declaring a climate emergency on 4 October 2019.
Angus Council	Yes	5 September 2019
Argyll and Bute Council	Yes	30 September 2021
Clackmannanshire Council	Yes	19 August 2021
Dumfries and Galloway Council	Yes	27 June 2019
Dundee City Council	Yes	24 June 2019
East Ayrshire Council	No	N/A
East Dunbartonshire Council	No	N/A
East Lothian Council	Yes	27 August 2019
East Renfrewshire Council	Yes	27 June 2019
Edinburgh Council	Yes	7 February 2019
Falkirk Council	Yes	27 August 2019
Fife Council	Yes	26 September 2019
Glasgow Council	Yes	16 May 2019
Highland Council	Yes	9 May 2019
Inverclyde Council	No	N/A
Midlothian Council	Yes	17 December 2019
Moray Council	Yes	27 June 2019
Comhairle nan Eilean Siar	No	N/A
North Ayrshire Council	Yes	11 June 2019
North Lanarkshire Council	Yes	20 June 2019
Orkney Islands Council	Yes	14 May 2019
Perth and Kinross Council	Yes	9 November 2022
Renfrewshire Council	Yes	27 June 2019
Scottish Borders Council	Yes	25 September 2020
Shetland Islands Council	Yes	22 January 2020
South Ayrshire Council	No	N/A
South Lanarkshire Council	No	The council has not formally declared a climate emergency but has signed up to ambitious goals to reduce emissions before the Scottish Governments benchmark of 2045.
Stirling Council	Yes	3 October 2019
West Dunbartonshire Council	Yes	29 May 2019
West Lothian Council	Yes	24 September 2019

== Wales ==
Wales local government areas that have declared a climate emergency
Local government area	Declared a climate emergency	Date
Blaenau Gwent County Borough Council (Cyngor Bwrdeistref Sirol Blaenau Gwent)	Yes	24 September 2020
Bridgend County Borough Council (Cyngor Bwrdeistref Sirol Pen-y-bont ar Ogwr)	Yes	22 July 2020
Caerphilly County Borough Council (Cyngor Bwrdeistref Sirol Caerffili)	Yes	4 June 2019
Cardiff Council (Cyngor Caerdydd)	Yes	28 March 2019
Carmarthenshire County Council (Cyngor Sir Gaerfyrddin)	Yes	20 February 2019
Ceredigion County Council (Cyngor Sir Ceredigion)	Yes	5 March 2020
Conwy County Borough Council (Cyngor Bwrdeistref Sirol Conwy)	Yes	9 May 2019
Denbighshire County Council (Cyngor Sir Ddinbych)	Yes	2 July 2019
Flintshire County Council (Cyngor Sir y Fflint)	No	N/A
Gwynedd Council (Cyngor Sir Gwynedd)	Yes	7 March 2019
Isle of Anglesey County Council (Cyngor Sir Ynys Môn)	Yes	8 Sept 2020
Merthyr Tydfil County Borough Council (Cyngor Bwrdeistref Sirol Merthyr Tudful)	No	N/A
Monmouthshire County Council (Cyngor Sir Fynwy)	Yes	16 May 2019
Neath Port Talbot County Borough Council (Cyngor Bwrdeistref Sirol Castell-nedd Port Talbot)	Yes	28 September 2022
Newport City Council (Cyngor Dinas Casnewydd)	Yes	13 March 2019
Pembrokeshire County Council (Cyngor Sir Penfro)	Yes	9 May 2019
Powys County Council (Cyngor Sir Powys)	Yes	24 September 2020
Rhondda Cynon Taf County Borough Council (Cyngor Bwrdeistref Sirol Rhondda Cynon Taf)	No	N/A
City and County of Swansea (Cyngor Sir a Dinas Abertawe)	Yes	27 June 2019
Torfaen County Borough Council (Cyngor Bwrdeistref Sirol Torfaen)	Yes	25 June 2019
Vale of Glamorgan Council (Cyngor Bwrdeistref Sirol Bro Morgannwg)	Yes	29 July 2019
Wrexham County Borough Council (Cyngor Bwrdeistref Sirol Wrecsam)	Yes	25 September 2019
