= CRC Energy Efficiency Scheme =

British carbon emissions reduction scheme

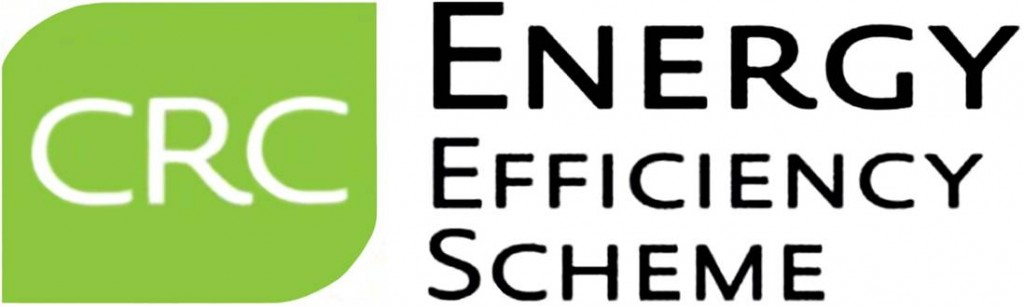

The CRC Energy Efficiency Scheme (the CRC, formerly the Carbon Reduction Commitment) was a mandatory carbon emissions reduction scheme in the United Kingdom which applied to large energy-intensive organisations in the public and private sectors. It was estimated that the scheme would reduce carbon emissions by 1.2 million tonnes of carbon per year by 2020. In an effort to avoid dangerous climate change, the British Government first committed to cutting UK carbon emissions by 60% by 2050 (compared to 1990 levels), and in October 2008 increased this commitment to 80%. The scheme has also been credited with driving up demand for energy-efficient goods and services.

The CRC was announced in the 2007 Energy White Paper, published on 23 May 2007. A consultation in 2006 showed strong support for it to be mandatory, rather than voluntary. The Commitment was introduced under enabling powers in Part 3 of the Climate Change Act 2008. A consultation into the scheme's implementation was launched in June 2007. The Scheme was introduced under the CRC Energy Efficiency Scheme Order 2010.

The Conservative Government withdrew the scheme in 2019.

== Performance league table ==
The first performance league table was published on 8 November 2011. It was based on the scheme's early action metric, which is a measure of good energy management prior to the establishment of an energy baseline. In the future the table will use a growth and an absolute metrics from this baseline. The table is expected to be particularly useful to ethical and green investors. Many notable brands are listed in the League table including the big four supermarkets, Asda (37), Morrisons (56), Tesco (93), and Sainsbury's (164). In all 22 organisations shared first position, news stories focused on the fact that Manchester United Football Club was one of those at the top of the table.

It was announced during the government's autumn statement on 5 December 2012 that after July 2013, these league and performance tables would no longer be published, and would instead be replaced by a publication of participants' energy use and emissions.

== Coverage ==
The CRC scheme will apply to organisations that have a half-hourly metered electricity consumption greater than 6,000 MWh per year. Organisations qualifying for CRC would have all their energy use covered by the scheme, including emissions from direct energy use as well as electricity purchased. Such organisations - including hotel chains, supermarkets, banks, central government and large Local Authorities - mostly fall below the threshold for the European Union Emissions Trading Scheme, but account for around 10% of the UK carbon emissions. Emissions covered by the EU Energy Trading Scheme and by a Climate Change Agreement would be exempt from the CRC, as would organisations with more than 25% of their emissions covered by Climate Change Agreements.

Half-hourly meters (HHM) record electricity consumption for every half-hour of every day, and generally provide this data to the supplier automatically via a telephone connection. Some organisations with high annual energy consumption do not use HHM, as their supplies are mainly on unrestricted or Economy 7 (day/night or 'evening and weekend') tariffs. However, they may nevertheless have to provide 'footprint reports'.

== Operating mechanisms ==
Although mandatory, the CRC will involve self-certification of emissions, backed up by spot audits, as opposed to third-party verification. Emission allowances are to be auctioned rather than grandfathered (as was the case in the initial stages of the EU Emissions Trading Scheme). The original proposal envisaged a revenue recycling mechanism, however this was removed to support the public finances after the comprehensive spending review. The Government announced in the budget the allowance price of £12/tCO2 for the first sale. They have also suggested there should be two fixed price sales in the first year of the scheme.

== Simplification ==
On 30 June 2011 the Government announced its initial proposals on simplifying the scheme. This came from the dialogue process the Department of Energy and Climate Change had been running from January, which was in response to the concerns of those organisations participating in the scheme that it was overly complex and this made compliance difficult and costly. The draft legislative proposals will be published in early 2012 for formal public consultation which will amend the existing CRC scheme. Among these proposals will be, continuing the fixed price sale (rather than auctions of allowances in a capped system) into the second phase, as recommended by the Committee on Climate Change, provide business with greater flexibility by allowing organisations to participate as natural business units, reducing the number of the fuels which are subject to the scheme from 30 to 4, removing the complex 90% rule and CCA exemption rules, whilst achieving broadly the same outcomes) and reducing overlap with other government schemes such as EU Emission Trading Scheme and Climate Change Agreements.

== Criticism ==
It has been suggested that the effectiveness of the CRC is limited by its overlap with the EU ETS. Critics argue that as companies reduce their electricity consumption, power stations produce less electricity and so require fewer EU Allowances; other entities covered by the ETS are then able to use these allowances for their own emissions. It has been suggested that allowances should be removed from the ETS in accordance with electricity reductions made under the CRC.

== See also ==
- Climate Change Act 2008
- The Green Deal
- Climate Change Agreement
- Capital allowance
- Energy policy of the United Kingdom
- Energy use and conservation in the United Kingdom
- Renewables Obligation
- United Kingdom Climate Change Programme
- Feed-in tariffs in the United Kingdom
