= Climate Change Agreement (UK) =

Climate change policy in the United Kingdom

When the Climate Change Levy was introduced in the United Kingdom, the position of energy-intensive industries was considered, given their energy usage, the requirements of the Integrated Pollution Prevention and Control regime and their exposure to international competition. As a result, a 65% discount from the levy was allowed for those sectors that agreed targets for improving their energy efficiency or reducing carbon emissions. The discount on electricity increased to 90% in 2013.

An 'energy-intensive' sector is one which either carries out activities which are listed as Part A(1) or A(2) activities in Part 2 of Schedule 1 to the Environmental Permitting (England and Wales) Regulations 2010 (Statutory Instrument 2010 No.675) (as amended), or that satisfies energy intensity criteria provided by the Department of Energy and Climate Change.

The regulations cover the ten main energy-intensive sectors of industry (aluminium, cement, ceramics, chemicals, food and drink, foundries, glass, non-ferrous metals, paper, and steel) and over thirty smaller sectors, and in agriculture, livestock units for the intensive rearing of pigs and poultry.

== See also ==
- Climate change in the United Kingdom
- Energy policy of the United Kingdom
- Renewables Obligation (United Kingdom)
- United Kingdom Climate Change Programme
