= United Kingdom Climate Change Programme =

United Kingdom's climate change programme

The United Kingdom's Climate Change Programme was launched in November 2000 by the British government in response to its commitment agreed at the 1992 United Nations Conference on Environment and Development (UNCED). The 2000 programme was updated in March 2006 following a review launched in September 2004.

In 2024, the UK was the world's 22nd greatest producer of man-made carbon emissions, producing around 0.8% of the global total generated from fossil fuels.

== Aim and progress ==
Global mean surface temperatures 1856 to 2007

The aims of the programme are not only to cut all greenhouse gas emissions by the agreed 12.5% from 1990 levels in the period 2008 to 2012 (the international Kyoto commitment), but to go beyond this by cutting carbon dioxide emissions by 20% from 1990 levels by 2010.

When the original programme was published in 2000, it confirmed that UK emissions were already forecast to be around 15% lower by 2010.

As of March 2006, government projections were in line with the official energy policy of the United Kingdom) so that, by 2010, the UK will have reduced its carbon dioxide emissions by about 15-18% below 1990 levels, thus missing the government's internal target but achieving its Kyoto Protocol target, with a projected reduction of emissions from the basket of all greenhouse gases (including carbon dioxide) of about 23-25% from 1990 levels.

== 2000 Climate Change Programme ==
The stated strategies of the 2000 programme were to:

- Improve business’ use of energy, stimulate investment and cut costs;
- Stimulate new, more efficient sources of power generation;
- Cut emissions from the transport sector;
- Promote better energy efficiency in the domestic sector, saving householders money;
- Improve the energy efficiency requirements of the building regulations;
- Continue cutting emissions from agriculture;
- Ensure the public sector took a leading role.

== Government actions ==
The following are among the actions taken to implement the strategy:

=== Climate Change Act ===
On 26 November 2008, after cross-party pressure over several years, led by environmental groups, the Climate Change Act became law. The Act puts in place a framework to achieve a mandatory 80% cut in the UK's carbon emissions by 2050 (compared to 1990 levels), with an intermediate target of between 34% by 2020 which would have risen in the event of a strong deal at the UN Climate Change Conference in Copenhagen.

=== Renewables Obligation ===
Introduced on 1 April 2002, the Renewables Obligation requires all electricity suppliers who supply electricity to end consumers to supply a set portion of their electricity from eligible renewables sources; a proportion that will increase each year until 2015 from a 3% requirement in 2002–2003, via 10.4% in 2010-2012 up to 15.4% by 2015–2016. The UK Government announced in the 2006 Energy Review an additional target of 20% by 2020–21. For each eligible megawatt hour of renewable energy generated, a tradable certificate called a renewables obligation certificate (ROC) is issued by OFGEM.

On or before 31 September following the RO year (1 Apr - 31 Mar) suppliers can meet their Renewables Obligation by:

- acquiring and redeeming ROCs,
- paying a buy-out price equivalent to £33.24/megawatt hour in 2006/07 and rising each year with retail price index, or
- a combination of redeeming ROCs and paying the buy-out price.

When a supplier meets all or part of its obligation by paying the buy-out price for each MWh of its obligation not discharged by the redemption of ROCs, the money is put into a holding account called the buy-out fund. The buy-out fund is recycled before 1 November to those electricity suppliers who presented ROCs against their Renewables Obligation. This 'recycling' is distributed equally for each ROC redeemed, those suppliers who did not redeem any ROCs will receive no 'recycling' from the buy-out fund.

The renewables obligation also makes requirements about how the electricity can be generated. An example is that the co-firing of biomass with coal is to be phased out - and will not be eligible for Renewable Obligation Certificates after 2016 (although the government has announced its intention to revisit the co-firing rules as part of the 2006 Energy Review).

The renewables transport fuel obligation is a separate law, which although is not in force yet, is set to become law. It would require bio-ethanol and bio-diesel to be added to road fuel, up to a limit of 2 or 5.75%. The land required for this would be considerable. It has been estimated (by the NFU) that the biomass could be grown by using all of the UK's net wheat exports, and growing wheat on 1,200 square kilometres of land.

=== Housing and community grants ===
Grants to assist with the installation of renewable energy sources in domestic properties and for community groups were made available through the Clear Skies organisation, and the Major Photovoltaics Demonstration programme. In 2006 these were replaced by the Low Carbon Buildings Programme (LCBP).

=== CRC Energy Efficiency Scheme ===
The CRC Energy Efficiency Scheme is a mandatory cap and trade scheme, announced in May 2007, that will apply to large non energy-intensive organisations in the public and private sectors, including hotel chains, supermarkets, banks, central government and large Local Authorities. It is anticipated that the scheme will have cut carbon emissions by 1.2 million tonnes of carbon per year by 2020.

The CRC scheme will apply to organisations that have a mandatory half-hourly metered electricity consumption greater than 6,000 MWh per year. This roughly equates to an electricity bill above £500,000 (US$1,000,000), although it would apply to emissions from direct energy use as well as electricity purchased.

=== The Green Deal ===
The Green Deal is a policy to encourage energy efficiency improvements in the UK's building stock. It will be financed through loans attached to the energy bills of the improved properties - The green deal was dropped by government in 2015.

=== Electricity Market Reform ===
Electricity Market Reform is a UK programme seeking to decarbonise electricity generation in the UK by providing low carbon generators guaranteed income through a contract for difference arrangement.

It is made up of 2 mechanisms: Contracts for Difference (CfD) and the Capacity Market (CM).

== Nottingham Declaration ==
Although not part of the central government programme, in local government, over 300 councils have signed up to the Nottingham Declaration, launched on 25 October 2000, committing them to work towards reducing emissions.

== See also ==
- Climate change in the United Kingdom
- Climate Change and Sustainable Energy Act 2006
- Action on climate change
- List of climate change initiatives
- List of countries by carbon dioxide emissions
- Making Sweden an Oil-Free Society
