= Impax =

Impax may refer to:

- IMPAX (software), a brand of software
- Impax Asset Management Group, a British company
- Impax Environmental Markets, a British company
- Impax Laboratories, an American company
