= Carbon Trust =

British non-profit climate change consultancy

The Carbon Trust
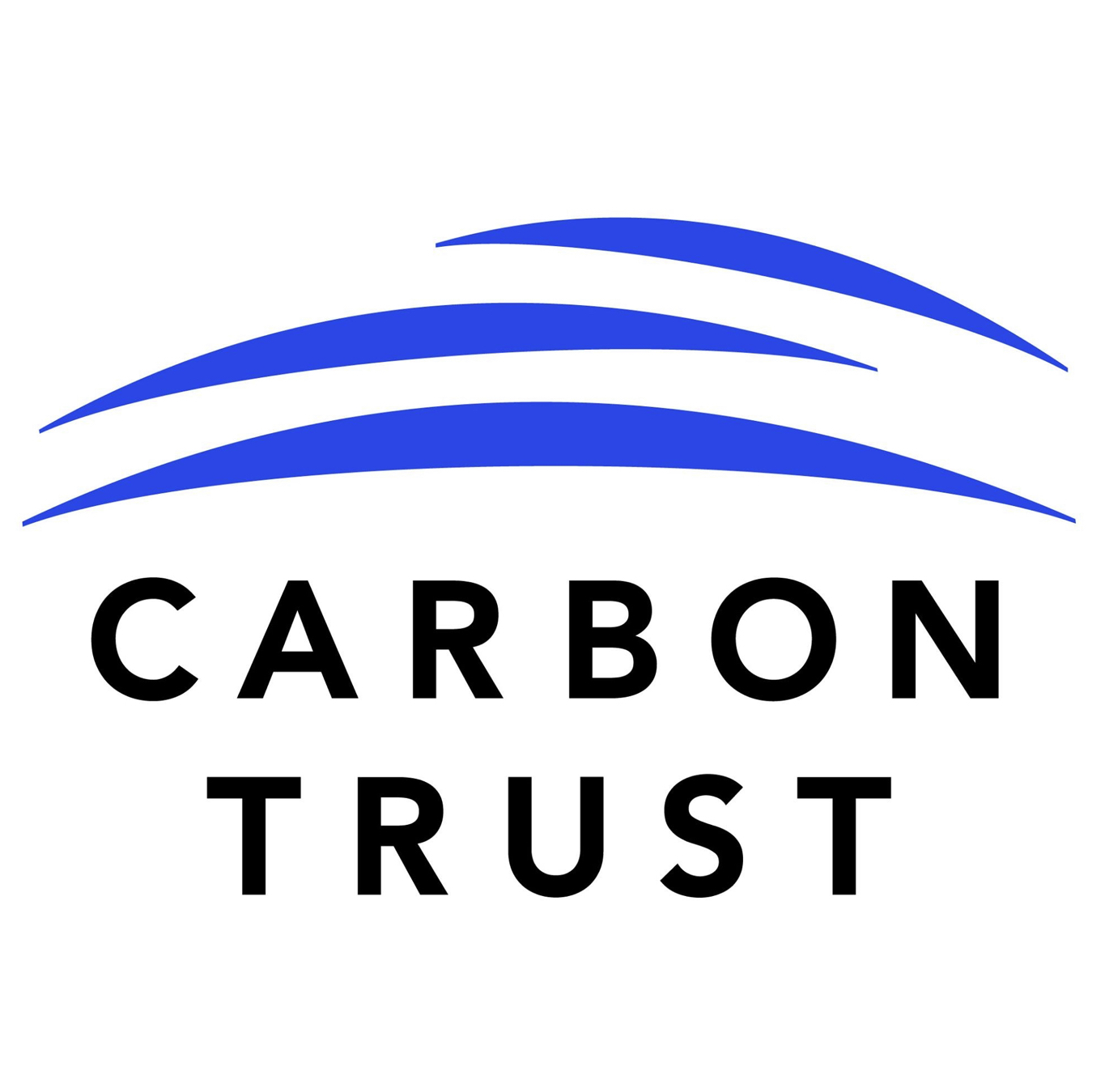
- Type: Not for Dividend Private Company Limited by Guarantee
- Industry: Carbon management and reduction
- Founded: March 2001; 25 years ago in London, United Kingdom
- Headquarters: London, United Kingdom
- Number of locations: 7
- Key people: Michael Rea (CEO); Baroness Brown of Cambridge (Chair)
- Number of employees: 400+
- Website: carbontrust.com

The Carbon Trust is a consultancy established in March 2001, with offices across the world. Its aim is to accelerate the pace of private and public sectors decarbonisation and increase energy efficiency in organisations worldwide.

The Carbon Trust was originally funded by around £50m of UK tax revenue generated from the Climate Change Levy (CCL), a tax on business energy use. The Carbon Trust's initial goal was to help businesses reduce energy costs and therefore offset the additional cost of paying the CCL. The establishment of the Carbon Trust was announced in the 2000 UK White Paper "Climate Change - the UK Programme" (Cmd 4913).

The Carbon Trust was conceived as a business-led, publicly funded organisation operating at arm's length from the UK government. The early concept, design, and governance were carried out in close consultation with business. Senior officials from the Devolved Administrations and the UK department (the Department of the Environment, Transport and the Regions) would sit on the Trust's Board, where non-business non-executive Directors were in the majority. However, the chair, CEO and most of the executive team were appointed from the private sector, most notably the oil and gas and management consultancy sectors. Founding CEO Tom Delay previously worked at Shell for 16 years before beginning his 22-year tenure as CEO of the trust.

In July 2023, Delay announced his retirement from his role as CEO of the Carbon Trust. In January 2024, the Carbon Trust appointed Chris Stark, former head of the UK Climate Change Committee, as CEO, with Stark's term beginning in Spring 2024. Stark resigned after three months to take up a role in government and was replaced by COO Michael Rea.

== Remit and initial programmes ==
The Trust began its work with three core activities:

- To ensure that UK business and the public sector contribute fully to meeting ongoing targets for greenhouse gas emissions.
- To improve the competitiveness of UK business through resource efficiency; and
- To support the development of a UK industry sector that capitalises on the innovation and commercial value of low carbon technologies nationally and internationally.

The need to recycle CCL revenues back to business by reducing energy costs through energy efficiency was a key early driver of the Carbon Trust's work. Its first act was to take over the UK government's £17m pa Energy Efficiency Best Practice Programme (EEBPP) in 2002, a UK-wide information-based measure providing independent advice and support on existing energy efficient technologies and energy management practices.

The Trust reconfigured the EEBPP to improve its focus and services to business under a new branding called "Action Energy".

The Carbon Trust also initiated work on new and emerging low carbon technologies using a range of programmes and measures including traditional research, development, and demonstration support to supporting early stage companies developing new technologies and practices. These activities came under the banner of the "Low Carbon Innovation Programme".

== Current work ==
The Carbon Trust is a global organisation, with offices in Mexico, the Netherlands, Germany, Singapore, South Africa and the UK.

== Services ==
The Carbon Trust provides sustainability education to businesses to help them save energy, as well as voluntary carbon certification services and carbon labelling schemes that verify carbon footprint data and companies' adherence to standards. It also works with governments and corporations on low carbon technologies, including offshore wind and marine energy.

== Carbon footprinting, verification and Carbon Trust standard ==
=== Carbon Trust standards ===
The Carbon Trust runs a series of environmental standards that certify measurement and reduction. Currently, these cover carbon, water and waste and have been awarded to hundreds of leading companies and organisations across the world.

In June 2008 the Carbon Trust introduced the Carbon Trust Carbon Standard to address what it describes as business greenwash. The Carbon Trust Carbon Standard is only awarded to companies and organisations who measure and reduce their carbon emissions year on year. Examples of organisations who have held the Carbon Standard include Sky, Aldi, Eurotunnel, Bupa, PricewaterhouseCoopers, Samsung Electronics, Angus Council, Capital & Regional, O2, npower, Credit Suisse and the Scottish Government.

In February 2013 the Carbon Trust introduced the Carbon Trust Water Standard to recognise those companies reducing their water use year on year. The first four companies to receive the Water Standard were Sainsbury's, Coca-Cola, Sunlight Services Group and Branston.

In July 2013 the Carbon Trust introduced the Carbon Trust Waste Standard. In November 2013 the waste standard was awarded to the first wave of organisations, which included The Football Association, Renishaw, Whitbread, PricewaterhouseCoopers and AkzoNobel Decorative Paints. These last three became the first in the world to gain the triple crown of reaching the carbon, water and waste standard.

In 2015, the Carbon Trust launched the Carbon Trust Supply Chain Standard to look at carbon footprints across the supply chain. It is the world's first independent certification for organisations that are measuring, managing and reducing greenhouse gas (CO2e) emissions in their supply chains.

=== Carbon footprint label ===
The Carbon Trust helps companies to measure the carbon emissions associated with their products (embodied emissions) and also provides a label for these products carbon footprint. Measuring the embodied emissions of products enables reductions to be identified and achieved across the supply chain. The label demonstrates a commitment by the product owner to reduce that footprint every two years. The Carbon Reduction Label was introduced in March 2007.

Examples of products that have featured the carbon footprint label are Amazon Devices, Evian water, Tetra Pak packaging, Kingsmill bread, Quorn foods, Silver Spoon sugar, Walkers crisps, a range of own brand products in Tesco supermarkets, Halifax (HBOS) bank accounts, Dyson airblades, Marshalls building products, Quaker oats, Lafarge cement, and Pompeian Olive Oil.

The standards behind carbon labelling are now formally recognised through the PAS 2050 developed by the Carbon Trust in conjunction with BSI and Defra. This methodology is now gaining international acceptance following its launch in October 2008.

However, currently this standard has been revised to the PAS 2050: 2011 version, but the Carbon Trust has not received UKAS accreditation.
