= High Council on Climate =

The High Council on Climate (French: Haut Conseil pour le Climat ) is an independent executive council in the Government of France announced by Emmanuel Macron in 2018 and created on 14 May 2019. The council is meant to address the countries climate policy, and produce reports on the progress of France towards its climate commitments. The organization was formed separately from the National Council for Ecological Transition which was formed to create a social dialogue body responding to groups, like the Yellow vests movement.

The current chair of the council is Corinne Le Quéré and the council includes 13 scientists and experts in climate change. The council is inspired by the Committee on Climate Change in the UK.

== Members ==
- Corinne Le Quéré
- Valérie Masson-Delmotte,
- Katheline Schubert
- Céline Guivarch
- Jean-François Soussana
- Laurence Tubiana
- Alain Grandjean
- Michel Colombier
- Marion Guillou
- Jean-Marc Jancovici
- Benoît Leguet
- Sophie Dubuisson-Quellier
- Magali Reghezza-Zitt

== Mission ==
The main role of the High Council on Climate is to provide advice and recommendations to the French government on climate change policies and strategies, including the implementation of the Paris Agreement. The council is tasked with evaluating the effectiveness of government policies and actions in reducing greenhouse gas emissions and adapting to the impacts of climate change.

It has expertise in three areas:

- the reduction of direct greenhouse gas emissions (reduction of fossil fuel consumption, transformation of the agricultural model, capture of methane from waste, etc.);
- the development of carbon sinks (forests, soils, oceans);
- reducing France's carbon footprint.

The council publishes annual reports that assess France's progress in meeting its climate targets and provide recommendations for future actions. The reports cover a wide range of topics, including:

- compliance with France's greenhouse gas emissions reduction trajectory;
- proper implementation of policies and measures to reduce greenhouse gas emissions (taxation, subsidies, support, etc.) and develop carbon sinks (forests, soils and oceans);
- the economic, social and environmental sustainability of these actions;
- the impact of these actions on the foreign trade balance.

Every five years, it issues a report on France's greenhouse gas emissions reduction trajectory, which is itself revised every five years. In this report, the committee assesses whether this trajectory is sufficient with regard to France's commitment to the Paris climate agreement, European commitments and the commitment to carbon neutrality in 2050, while taking into account the economic and social sustainability of the transition as well as the issues of sovereignty.

The High Council on Climate also engages in public outreach and education, raising awareness about the importance of addressing climate change and the need for urgent action.
