= Energy Transitions Commission =

International think tank

- Abbreviation: ETC
- Formation: 28 September 2015; 10 years ago
- Type: International organization
- Legal status: Active
- Purpose: Develop actionable insights to help energy decision-makers in their efforts to meet the twin objectives of economic development and climate change mitigation
- Headquarters: London
- Fields: Environment, Energy
- Chair: Lord Adair Turner
- Website: www.energy-transitions.org

The Energy Transitions Commission (ETC) is an international think tank, focusing on economic growth and climate change mitigation. It was created in September 2015 and is based in London. The commission currently contains 32 commissioners from a selection of individuals and company and government leaders.

== Activities ==
The primary activity of the commission is publishing reports and position papers. They are typically supported by a body of readily available or explicitly commissioned data sets provided by various independent or industry-related organizations. The findings of reports are then reviewed through a broad consultation process within and outside of the commission. Finally, the report or position paper is redacted and generally understood to constitute the collective view of the ETC commission. Although individual commissioners may disagree with particular findings or recommendations, the general direction of the arguments developed in the publications is guided by consensus.

== Publications ==
Since its founding in 2015, the commission has published two extensive reports and half a dozen papers. For example, Pathways from Paris – Accessing the INDC Opportunity, is a 25-page study of INDCs (i.e. the plans developed by individual countries and submitted at the 2015 UN Climate Change Conference in Paris). This investigation highlighted the mechanisms various countries utilize in order to reduce emissions and identify opportunities for further reductions. News outlets of general interest and the specialized press reported summaries of these reports. Both reports outlined below were cited as reference to several articles in a 2018 special report edition of The Economist magazine.

=== Better Energy, Greater Prosperity ===
This 120-page report recognized the opportunity to halve global carbon emissions by 2040. According to the report, it is possible to simultaneously ensure economic development and access affordable, sustainable energy for all, while reducing carbon emissions by half the current output.

The report suggested four strategies to be concurrently implemented:

- Accelerate clean electricity access.
- Decarbonize beyond power generation, using bioenergy, hydrogen, and carbon capture for industrial activities and transport modes which cannot be electrified in an economical fashion.
- Improve energy productivity by targeting a 3% energy productivity per year (compared to 1.5% currently)
- Optimize usage of remaining fossil fuel uses

According to the report, the strategies listed above would have reduced fossil fuel consumption by 30%, but 50% of energy needs would have needed to be met with fossil fuels. This, the report explained, could be solved by optimizing usage of these sources by switching from coal to gas, by preventing methane leakages, and by stopping routine flaring. Another area of optimization would come from carbon capture or sequestration such as underground storage, and finally a decrease in fossil fuel use.

The report suggested two solutions for energy policy:

- Increased investment, keeping in mind that the investment required by the transition is estimated to be between $300-600 billion USD annually. At this level, the cost would not cause a significant macroeconomic challenge, relative to the approximately $20 trillion in anticipated savings and investments annually. The issue is more one of a shift in the mix of investments: moving away from fossil fuels and toward low carbon technologies and energy-efficient equipment and infrastructure.
- Public governance, with the introduction of coherent and predictable policies which favour the energetic transition, along with the phasing out of fossil fuel subsidies and the introduction of carbon pricing.

=== Mission Possible ===
This 172-page report focused on the "hard to abate sectors", namely:

- Heavy industry: cement, steel and plastics
- Heavy duty transport: heavy road transport, maritime shipping, and aviation

Collectively, these sectors currently represent approximately 30% of energy emissions, with the potential to increase to 60% by 2050 (due to the reduction of the share owed to other sectors, and to the demand growth in these hard to abate sectors).

The report concluded that full decarbonization of these sectors is feasible and the cost to the global economy would be less than 0.5% of GDP by 2050. It also identifies cement, plastics and shipping as the most challenging sectors, due to process emissions, end-of-life emissions and the fragmented nature of the maritime industry respectively. The feasibility if not inevitability of some of these transitions, for example these concerning the industrial production of ammonia, are echoed (or in some cases originate from) the respective industry sectors.

== Funding ==
The ETC is funded by various businesses and organizations, including major oil and gas companies – this was a source of concern from many observers. Current or past sponsors include Bank of America Merrill Lynch, BHP Billiton, Energy Systems Catapult, CO2 Sciences, the European Climate Foundation, the Grantham Foundation and the UN Foundation. Regardless of funding every Commissioner has an equal voice and participation in ETC activities.

== List of commissioners ==
Current and past commissioners
Start date	End date	Current	Name	Position	Company / organization	References
2019-09-28		Y	Badar Khan	President	National Grid Ventures	
2019-09-27		Y	Siddar Sharma	Group chief sustainability officer	Tata	
2018-11-19		Y	Dominic Emery	Vice-president, group strategic planning	BP	
2018-11-19		Y	Lei Zhang	CEO	Envision Group	
2018-11-19		Y	Mahendra Singhi	Managing director and CEO	Dalmia Cement (Bharat) Limited	
2018-11-19		Y	Nandita Parshad	Managing director, energy and natural resources	European Bank for Reconstruction and Development	
2018-11-19		Y	Richard Lancaster	CEO	CLP Holdings Limited	
2018-11-19		Y	Robert Trezona	Partner, head of cleantech	IP Group	
2018-11-19		Y	Will Gardiner	CEO	DRAX	
2018-11-19		Y	Zoe Knight	Managing director and group head, Centre of Sustainable Finance	HSBC	
2018-09-27		Y	Andreas Regnell	Senior vice-president, strategic development	Vattenfall	
2018-03-26		Y	Mark Laabs	Managing director	Modern Energy	
2017-08-19		Y	Zhang Lei	CEO and founder	Envision Group	
2017-04-25		Y	Cathy Zoi	President	Odyssey Energy	
2017-04-25		Y	Changwen Zhao	Director general, Department of Industrial Economy	Development Research Center of the State Council of China	
2017-04-25		Y	Laurence Tubiana	CEO	European Climate Foundation	
2017-02-13		Y	Laurent Auguste	Senior executive vice-president, innovation and markets	Veolia	
2017-02-13		Y	Pierre-André de Chalendar	Chairman and CEO	Saint-Gobain	
2016-05-16		Y	Auke Lont	CEO (previously at Statoil)	Statnett	
2016-05-16		Y	Philip New	CEO	Catapult Energy Systems	
2020-01-01		Y	Damilola Ogunbiyi	CEO	Sustainable Energy For All	
2016-03-16		Y	Adair Turner	Chair	Energy Transitions Commission	
2016-03-16		Y	Alex Laskey	President and founder	Opower	
2016-03-16		Y	Nigel Topping	CEO	We Mean Business	.
2015-09-28		Y	Ajay Mathur	Director general	The Energy and Resources Institute	,
2015-09-28		Y	Andrew Steer	President and CEO	World Resources Institute	,
2015-09-28		Y	Chad Holliday	Chairman	Royal Dutch Shell	
2015-09-28		Y	Jules Kortenhorst	CEO	Rocky Mountain Institute	,
2015-09-28		Y	Nicholas Stern	Professor	London School of Economics	,
2015-09-28		Y	Timothy Wirth	Vice chair	United Nations Foundation	,
2015-09-28		Y	Zhao Changwen	Director general industrial economy	Development Research Center State Council China	
2019-09-28		N	Lord Gregory Baker	Executive chairman of the board of directors	EN+	
2018-11-19		N	Arvid Moss	Executive vice president, energy and corporate business development	Hydro	
2018-11-19		N	Gopi Katragadda	Chief technology officer and innovation head	Tata Sons	
2017-08-19		N	Deb Frodl	Global executive director	GE Ecomagination	
2017-08-19	2018-11-19	N	Didier Holleaux	Executive vice-president	ENGIE	
2017-04-25	2018-00-00	N	Riccardo Puliti	Senior director, energy and extractives global practice	World Bank	
2017-02-13	2018-00-00	N	Stuart Gulliver	Group chief executive	HSBC	
2016-05-16	2017-08-11	N	Al Gore	Chairman	Generation Investment Management	,
2016-05-16	2017-04-25	N	Mukund Rajan	Member group executive council	Tata	
2016-04-15	2017-01-00	N	Kate Gordon	Vice chair for climate and sustainable urbanization	Paulson Institute	
2016-04-15	2018-00-00	N	Poppy Allonby	Managing director, natural resources	BlackRock	
2016-03-16	2018-05-00?	N	Bernard David	Chairman and CEO	The Global CO2 Initiative	,
2016-03-16	2017-09-00	N	Purna Saggurti	Chairman, global corporate and investment banking	Bank of America Merrill Lynch	
2016-03-16	2017-12-00	N	Tony Cudmore	Chief public affairs officer / head of sustainability and public policy	BHP Billiton	
2016-03-16		N	Yngve Slyngstad	CEO	Norges Bank Investment Management (NBIM)	.
2015-09-28	2017-04-00	N	Anita George	Senior director energy and extractives	World Bank Group	
2015-09-28		N	Dean Dalla Valle	Chief commercial officer	BHP Billiton	
2015-09-28		N	Hank Paulson	Chairman	Paulson Institute	
2015-09-28		N	Jay Faison	Founder	ClearPath Foundation	
2015-09-28	2018-11-19	N	Jean-Pascal Tricoire	Chairman and CEO	Schneider Electric	
2015-09-28	2018-00-00	N	Kandeh Yumkella	Former CEO	Sustainable Energy For All (SE4All)	
2015-09-28		N	Lorenzo Simonelli	CEO	General Electric, Oil & Gas	
2015-09-28	2018-00-00	N	Peter Terium	CEO	RWE AG	
2014-08-01		N	Johannes Meier	CEO	European Climate Foundation	
2014-08-01	2017-01-00	N	Felipe Calderon	Former president of Mexico		
