= Chris Stark (climate expert) =

British climate policy adviser and entrepreneur

Chris Stark is a British climate policy adviser and public official, who specialises in the interplay between climate change policy and business. In July 2024, he was announced as the head of a new Mission Control centre for clean energy. He is also an Honorary Professor at Glasgow University and a Fellow of the Royal Society of Edinburgh.

Stark is a former chief executive of the UK’s Climate Change Committee, where he became known for recommending a net zero target which has since been implemented into law – reportedly a first among major economies. He was also briefly chief executive of British climate change consultancy Carbon Trust.

== Career ==
Early in his career, Stark held a number of roles at HM Treasury and the Department for Business, Innovation and Skills, as it was then known. In May 2016, he was named director of energy and climate change in the Scottish Government, a position he held until April 2018.

Stark was chief executive of the Climate Change Committee between April 2018 and April 2024. His leadership of the Committee is credited for recommending a UK net zero target for greenhouse gas emissions by 2050, which is now in law.

In January 2024, Stark was announced as the chief executive of British climate change consultancy Carbon Trust. He took office in April that same year.

Three months later – following the election of the Labour Party in the UK’s general election on 4 July 2024 – Stark was appointed by Energy Security Secretary Ed Miliband as head of the new Mission Control centre dedicated to providing the UK with clean energy.

Stark has been an Honorary Professor at the University of Glasgow’s Centre for Public Policy since November 2023, and a Fellow of the Royal Society of Edinburgh since April 2024. He sits on the boards of the V&A Dundee and climate charity Murmur.

== Accolades ==
On leaving the Climate Change Committee, Stark was described by Professor Piers Forster as “a dedicated public servant.” The Guardian newspaper praised him for his management of the Committee at a time when the Conservative government was reportedly briefing against statutory watchdogs, and for "his steady insistence on telling the government truths it did not want to hear."

The then Energy Security Secretary Claire Coutinho credited his leadership of the Committee with many advances, including helping the UK become “the first major economy to put our net zero commitments into law, with the UK becoming the first country in the G20 to halve its carbon emissions.”

On his appointment as chief executive of Carbon Trust, Stark was described by Julia King, Baroness Brown of Cambridge, as “a leader in the climate action space, both within the UK and globally.”
