= Ian Simm =

British businessman (born 1966)

- Born: 1966 (age 59–60); West Yorkshire, United Kingdom
- Education: University of Cambridge (BA), Harvard University (MBA)
- Occupation: Businessman
- Known for: Founder and CEO of Impax Asset Management
- Notable work: Development of environmental markets classification (1999)
- Board member of: Net Zero Council; Net Zero Innovation Board; Institutional Investors Group on Climate Change; Confederation of British Industry (Net Zero Committee); Natural Environment Research Council (2013–2018)
- Children: 2

Ian Simm is a British businessman and the founder and chief executive officer (CEO) of Impax Asset Management, an investment firm focused on the transition to a more sustainable economy.

== Early life and education ==
Ian Simm was born in West Yorkshire in 1966 and educated at a state school. He went on to study natural sciences at Cambridge University, where he specialised in physics, and graduated with first-class honours in 1988. While at Cambridge, he ran the university’s expedition society and developed an interest in environmental issues after reading Our Common Future (1987), the influential report by former Norwegian prime minister Gro Harlem Brundtland that popularized the term "sustainable development". In his final-year project, he used satellite images to analyze arctic sea ice.

Simm later pursued postgraduate study in the United States, completing a master’s degree in public administration at Harvard University in 1993. His early career included environmental consultancy, an expedition to West Africa to track vegetation on the edge of the Sahara Desert (during which he contracted malaria and led an expedition to cross the Sahara on a tandem bicycle) and an attempt to launch a solar lighting business in South Africa. In 1998, Simm joined Impax Capital - then a small corporate finance firm.

== Career ==
With a mandate from the World Bank to help it design and run a solar energy investment fund, Simm founded Impax Asset Management in 1998. In 1999, he and colleague Bruce Jenkyn-Jones developed a classification of environmental markets, which later underpinned FTSE Russell’s Green Revenues Classification system. Impax listed on the London Stock Exchange in 2001 and formally partnered with FTSE to expand its range of environmental indexes in 2008.

The company grew steadily under Simm's guidance. In 2017, Institutional Investor described Impax as “one of Europe’s largest green investment firms” following its acquisition of U.S.-based Pax World Management.

In later years, Simm has frequently represented Impax in the financial press, outlining its investment philosophy, defending its strategy during periods of volatility, and articulating the case for investing in resource efficiency and sustainability.

== Views and advocacy ==
In a 2021 profile, Simm argued that investing in companies addressing environmental challenges provided a compelling business case, apart from any notion of ethics. Simm has stated that investing in the transition to a more sustainable economy has "drivers and potential well into the 2030s and beyond", as a low-carbon world will require staggering levels of investment.

He has also been a prominent critic of the widespread use of the term ESG (environmental, social and governance). He has described the acronym as “lazy” and expressed concern that it obscured more precise distinctions within investing.

== Board and advisory roles ==
Simm holds a number of roles outside his executive work at Impax. He is a member of the UK government’s Net Zero Council, which advises the government on its low carbon objectives, and the Net Zero Innovation Board, which oversees public sector funding of energy innovation programmes. He also serves on the board of the Institutional Investors Group on Climate Change (IIGCC) He is a commissioner with the Energy Transitions Commission, a global coalition developing roadmaps to net-zero emissions, and he chairs the Net Zero Committee of the Confederation of British Industry.

Between 2013 and 2018, Simm was a board member of the Natural Environment Research Council (NERC), the UK’s principal public funder of environmental science. He also served s a Commissioner with the Severn Estuary Commission.

== Recognition ==
At the Financial News Asset Management Awards 2020, Simm was named Industry Leader of the Year. In 2024, Financial News included Simm in its list of the Most Influential in Sustainable Finance, naming him as one of six European leaders in the field.

== Personal life ==
Simm lives in London. He is married and has two children.
