= Corinne Le Quéré =

French-Canadian climatologist (born 1966)

Professor Corinne Le Quéré CBE FRS
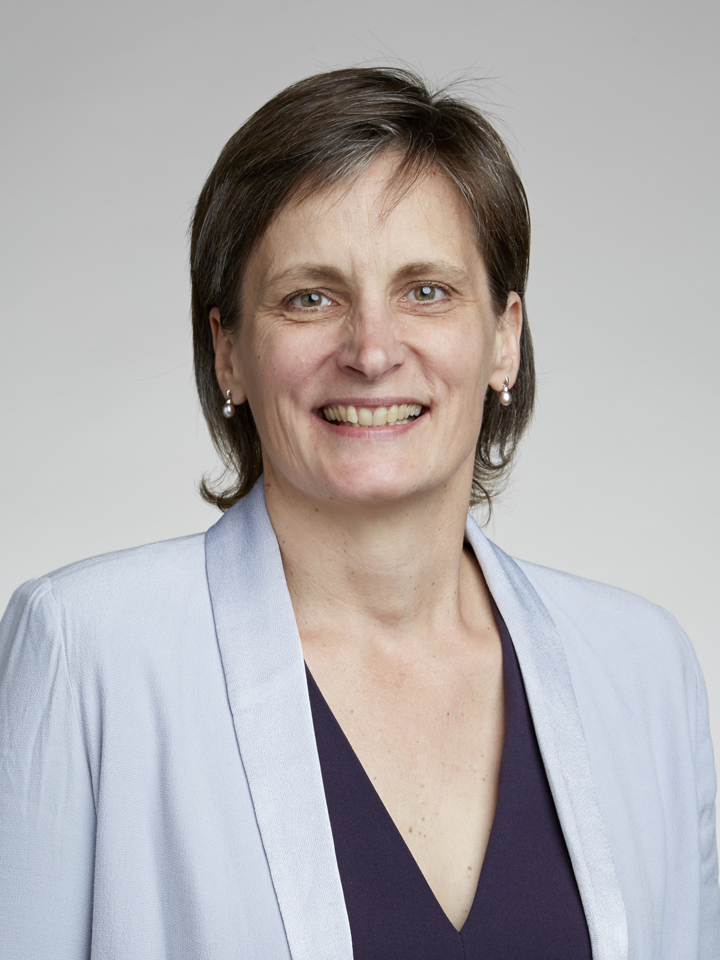
- Le Quéré in 2016
- Born: July 1966 (age 60); Quebec, Canada
- Education: University of Montreal; McGill University; University of Paris VI
- Scientific career
- Fields: Climatology
- Workplaces: University of East Anglia
- Website: people.uea.ac.uk/c_lequere

Corinne Le Quéré CBE FRS (born July 1966) is a Canadian scientist. She is Royal Society Research Professor of Climate Change Science at the University of East Anglia and former Director of Tyndall Centre for Climate Change Research. She was the founding chair of the French High Council on Climate (2018-2024) and is a member of the UK Climate Change Committee since 2016. Her research focuses on the interactions between the carbon cycle and climate change.

== Education ==
Le Quéré received her B.Sc. in physics from University of Montreal, an M.S. in Atmospheric and Oceanic Sciences from McGill University, and a Ph.D. in oceanography from University of Paris VI.

== Personal and early life ==
Le Quéré was born in Quebec in 1966 and as a child spent her camping holidays in the national parks of Eastern Canada which fostered her interest in the natural world. She completed high school in 1984 and enrolled for a course in general studies at the University of Ottawa, near to her home in Gatineau, prior to transferring to the University of Montreal to study physics.

Le Quéré later became a British Citizen and holds both French and Canadian passports. She is now married to her second husband and has a daughter from her first marriage, Marianne, who she raised partly as a single mother.

On 3 February 2023, Le Quéré was a guest on BBC's Desert Island Discs on Radio 4 (presented by Lauren Laverne). As an imaginary Castaway she chose a mask and snorkel as her luxury items and, for her favourite disc, La Vida Es Un Carnaval by Celia Cruz. For her book, she chose World Atlas of the Oceans by Dave Monahan.

== Career and research ==
She was co-chair of the Global Carbon Project (GCP) from 2009 until 2013. Within the GCP, she initiated and directed for over a decade the annual publication of the Global Carbon Budget. During 2014-2017 she has been a member of the Scientific Committee of the Future Earth platform for sustainability research. She is author of the 3rd, 4th and 5th assessment reports of the Intergovernmental Panel on Climate Change. She conducted research at Princeton University in the US (1992–1996), at the Max Planck Institute for Biogeochemistry in Germany (2000–2005), and jointly between the UEA and the British Antarctic Survey in the UK (2005–2010).

== Honours and awards ==
In 2012, Le Quéré was awarded the Claude Berthault award from the French Academy of Sciences, the first Copernicus medal of the Copernicus Gesellschaft e.V. in 2013/2014, and was the annual Bolin lecturer in Stockholm University in 2014.

In 2015, she received a Blaise Pascal Medal for Earth and Environmental Sciences from the European Academy of Sciences and the Grande Médaille Albert 1er de Monaco, Science section.

In 2016, Le Quéré was elected a Fellow of the Royal Society.

In 2019, Le Quéré was appointed Commander of the Order of the British Empire (CBE) in the 2019 Birthday Honours for services to climate change science.

In 2019, she also won the Prince Albert I Medal and was made a Chevalier of the French Legion of Honour.

In 2020, she received the Heineken Prize for Environmental Sciences for her interdisciplinary research on the interactions between climate change and the carbon cycle.

In 2025, she received the Vladimir Ivanovich Vernadsky Medal of the European Geosciences Union.

She was awarded an honorary doctorate from Utrecht University (2023) and from the Université de Montréal (2025).

== Selected publications ==
A full list of Le Quéré's peer-reviewed publications can be found on her Publons profile.

- Economy-wide but fragile decreases in greenhouse gas emissions supported by climate policy in France (2025). Le Quéré, C., Comptes Rendus Geoscience, 357, 503-516. https://comptes-rendus.academie-sciences.fr/geoscience/articles/10.5802/crgeos.311/
- Fossil CO_{2} emissions in the post-COVID-19 era (2021). Le Quéré, C. et al., Nature Climate Change, 11, 197–199, https://doi.org/10.1038/s41558-021-01001-0.
- Emerging climate impact on carbon sinks in a consolidated carbon budget. Friedlingstein, P., Le Quéré, C., et al. (2026). Nature, 649, 98-103. https://www.nature.com/articles/s41586-025-09802-5
- Decreasing importance of carbon-climate feedbacks in the Southern Ocean in a warming climate. Jarnikova, T., Le Quéré, C., Rumbold, S., & Jones, C. (2025). Science Advances, 11(20), eadr3589. https://doi.org/10.1126/sciadv.adr3589
- Temporary reduction in daily global CO_{2} emissions during the COVID-19 forced confinement. Le Quéré, C. et al (2020). Nature Climate Change, 10, 647-653. https://doi.org/10.1038/s41558-020-0797-x
- Drivers of declining CO_{2} emissions in 18 developed economies. Le Quéré, C. et al. (2019). Nature Climate Change, 9, 213-217. https://doi.org/10.1038/s41558-019-0419-7
- Role of zooplankton dynamics for Southern Ocean phytoplankton biomass and global biogeochemical cycles. Le Quéré, C. et al. (2016). Biogeosciences 13, 4111–4133. https://doi.org/10.5194/bg-13-4111-2016
- The Global Carbon Budget 1959-2011. Le Quéré, C., and 31 others (2013), Earth System Science Data (ESSD), 5, 165-186. https://essd.copernicus.org/articles/5/165/2013/
- Ecosystem dynamics based on plankton functional types for global ocean biogeochemistry models. Le Quéré, C., and 9 others (2005). Global Change Biology, 11, 2016-2040. https://doi.org/10.1111/j.1365-2486.2005.1004.x
- Oceanic carbon dioxide uptake in a model of century-scale global warming. Sarmiento, J.L. and C. Le Quéré (1996). Science, 274, 1346-1350. https://doi.org/10.1126/science.274.5291.1346
