= Céline Guivarch =

French climate scientist

- Education: École Polytechnique
- Known for: research on climate change
- Scientific career
- Workplaces: École des Ponts ParisTech
- Website: Céline Guivarch

Céline Guivarch is a French climate scientist modelling the impact of climate change from a multidisciplinary perspective and how to limit it. She is a research director at École des Ponts ParisTech. She is a member of the French High Council on Climate and a lead author on the IPCC Sixth Assessment Report (Working Group 3).

She was the recipient of the French Minister of Higher Education, Research and Innovation Irène Joliot-Curie Prize in 2020.

== Education and career ==
Guivarch ranked 1st and studied at the prestigious French engineering school École Polytechnique and conducted her doctoral research on the evaluation of the cost of climate policies at the International Center on Environment and development (CIRED).

== Awards and honours ==
- 2020 Irène Joliot-Curie Prize
