= Peterborough School, Fulham =

Former school in Fulham, London, England

Coordinates: 51.470523°N 0.196216°W

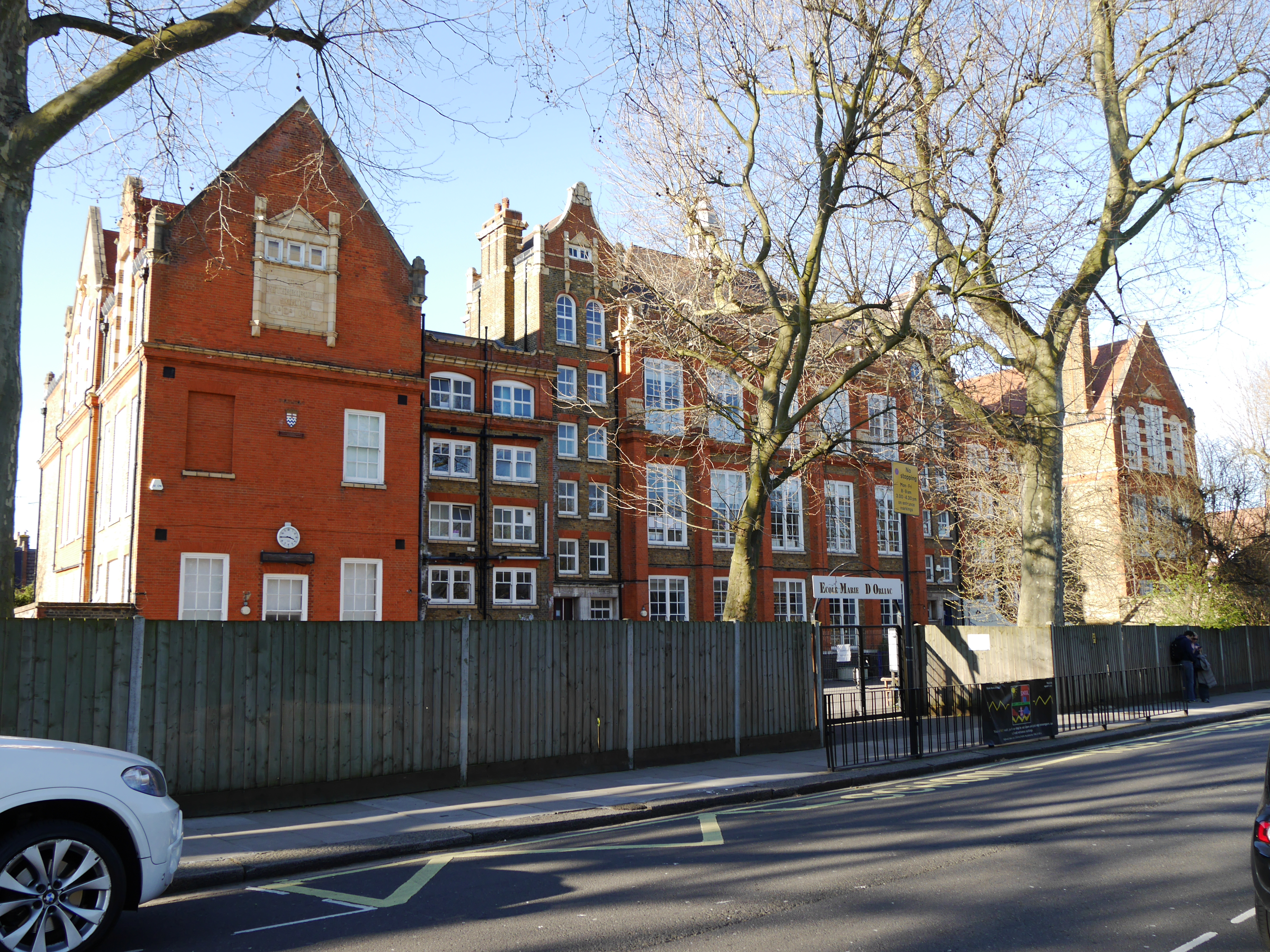
Peterborough School, Fulham

Peterborough School is a Grade II listed former school at Clancarty Road, Fulham, London SW6.

It was built in 1903–04, and the architect was T. J. Bailey, for the London Board School. London Borough of Hammersmith and Fulham education department closed the school in 2007. Half of it was leased to Queensmill School, the other half to the Lycée Français Charles de Gaulle for its primary school, École Marie d'Orliac.

Janet Street-Porter, actress Gaynor Hodgson and boxer George Groves were pupils of Peterborough Primary School.
