= Science Based Targets initiative =

International climate change collaboration

- Abbreviation: SBTi
- Formation: 2015; 11 years ago
- Founder: CDP; United Nations Global Compact; World Resources Institute; World Wide Fund for Nature
- Type: Charity and limited company
- Registration no.: 1205768; 14960097
- Legal status: Active
- Purpose: Supporting corporate climate change mitigation measures
- Headquarters: London, United Kingdom
- Region served: Worldwide
- Products: Standards; Tools; Guidance
- Services: Science-based target validation
- Fields: Climate change mitigation Corporate sustainability
- Official language: English
- CEO: David Kennedy
- Chair of the Board of Trustees: Francesco Starace
- Board of directors: Board of Trustees
- Subsidiaries: SBTi Services Limited; SBTi gGmbH
- Affiliations: ISEAL Alliance
- Staff: 200 (2025)
- Website: sciencebasedtargets.org

The Science Based Targets initiative (SBTi) is a global initiative to combat climate change, aimed specifically at assisting companies with setting science-based targets to reduce their greenhouse gas emissions in line with the goals of the Paris Agreement.

It is a collaboration between its founding partners, namely the CDP, the United Nations Global Compact, the World Resources Institute (WRI), the World Wildlife Fund (WWF), and the We Mean Business Coalition.

As of 2025, over 10,000 companies have set or committed to setting science-based climate targets validated by the SBTi.

== Organization ==
The Science Based Targets initiative was established in 2015 to help companies to set emission reduction targets in line with climate science and Paris Agreement goals. It is funded by IKEA Foundation, Amazon, Bezos Earth Fund, We Mean Business coalition, Rockefeller Brothers Fund and UPS Foundation.

In October 2021, SBTi developed and launched the world's first net zero standard, providing the framework and tools for companies to set science-based net zero targets and limit global temperature rise above pre-industrial levels to 1.5 °C.

Best practice as identified by SBTi is for companies to adopt transition plans covering scope 1, 2 and 3 emissions, set out short-term milestones, ensure effective board-level governance and link executive compensation to the company's adopted milestones.

SBTi is a UK charity with a commercial subsidiary, SBTi Services, which offers to validate climate targets set by companies as science-based targets for a fee.

As of 2025, SBTi operates without a central office and has 200 staff who primarily work remotely, including part-time employees. This has led to challenges in meeting the demands of a growing client base of companies seeking SBTi validation for climate targets.

== Sector-specific guidance ==
SBTi developed separate sector-specific methodologies, frameworks and requirements for different industries. As of September 2024, sector guidance is available for:

- Aluminium (Scoping phase)
- Apparel and footwear (Finalized)
- Aviation (In development)
- Buildings (Finalized)
- Chemicals (In development)
- Cement (Finalized)
- Financial institutions (Finalized)
- Forest, Land and Agriculture (Finalized)
- Information and Communication Technology (Finalized)
- Land transport (In development)
- Maritime (Finalized)
- Oil and Gas (Paused)
- Power (Finalized)
- Steel (Finalized)

== Carbon offsets controversy ==
In April 2024 the SBTi Board of Trustees released a statement setting out an intention to permit the use of environmental attribute certificates (EACs) for abatement purposes against Scope 3 emissions reduction targets. SBTi did not previously permit the use of EACs due to the difficulties faced in tracing, measuring and validating their impact.

The Bezos Earth Fund, a major funder of the SBTi, exerted influence on SBTi board members to relax the organization's position on carbon offsets. The statement led to a response letter signed by various teams within the SBTi and media speculation about the policy change. The counter argument set out in the response being that carbon offsets are incompatible with the Paris Agreement.

Launched in September 2022, the SBTi's Forestry, Land and Agriculture (FLAG) guidance allows companies to claim the achievement of their emission reduction targets through 'insetting', breaking from the long-held SBTi position that emission reduction targets should only be achieved through emission reductions. Insetting is a business-driven concept and not a term defined in international standards and guidelines such as ISO 14050 Environmental Vocabulary and IWA 42 Net Zero Guidelines.

On 2 July 2024, CEO Luiz Amaral announced that he would step down for personal reasons. In January 2025, David Kennedy was announced as the new CEO.

== See also ==
- Carbon accounting
- Carbon Disclosure Project
- Carbon footprint
- Carbon neutrality
- Carbon offsets and credits
- Corporate sustainability
- Climate change
- Greenhouse gas emissions
- Greenhouse gas inventory
- Net zero emissions
- Paris Agreement
- United Nations Global Compact
- World Resources Institute
