= Tom Delay (businessman) =

British businessman (born 1959)

Thomas Auguste Read Delay
- Born: 1959 (age 66–67)
- Occupation: Businessman

Thomas Auguste Read Delay CBE (born 9 April 1959) is a British businessman, and a commentator on business issues arising from the impact of climate change. He was Carbon Trust's first chief executive at its creation in 2001, and served in that role for over two decades until December 2023.

== Background ==
Delay was educated at the Lycée Français Charles de Gaulle in London. He went on to study mechanical engineering at the University of Southampton. He also holds an MBA from INSEAD in Fontainebleau.

== Career ==
After qualifying as a chartered engineer, Delay worked at Shell for 16 years in commercial and operations roles across Africa and Europe. He then moved into management consultancy, working at McKinsey and A.T. Kearney.

In 2001, Delay was appointed as the Carbon Trust's first chief executive, at its formation. He was initially appointed by a joint committee of the UK Office of the Deputy Prime Minister and the Confederation of British Industry. In June 2023, he announced he would be stepping down from his role at Carbon Trust after two decades in post.

Delay is a member of the UK Energy Research Partnership, and in 2011 he was also appointed to the UK Offshore Wind Cost Reduction Task Force.

He chairs the advisory board of Imperial College London's Centre for Climate Finance & Investment, and its MSc in Climate Change Management & Finance. He is also on the advisory board for the Global CO_{2} Initiative at the University of Michigan.

Delay is a board member of Severn Trent Plc, where he chairs the Corporate Sustainability Committee.

== Honours ==
Delay was appointed a CBE by the Queen in the 2018 New Year Honours for services to sustainability in business.
