= Adair Turner, Baron Turner of Ecchinswell =

British businessman (born 1955)

The Right Honourable The Lord Turner of Ecchinswell
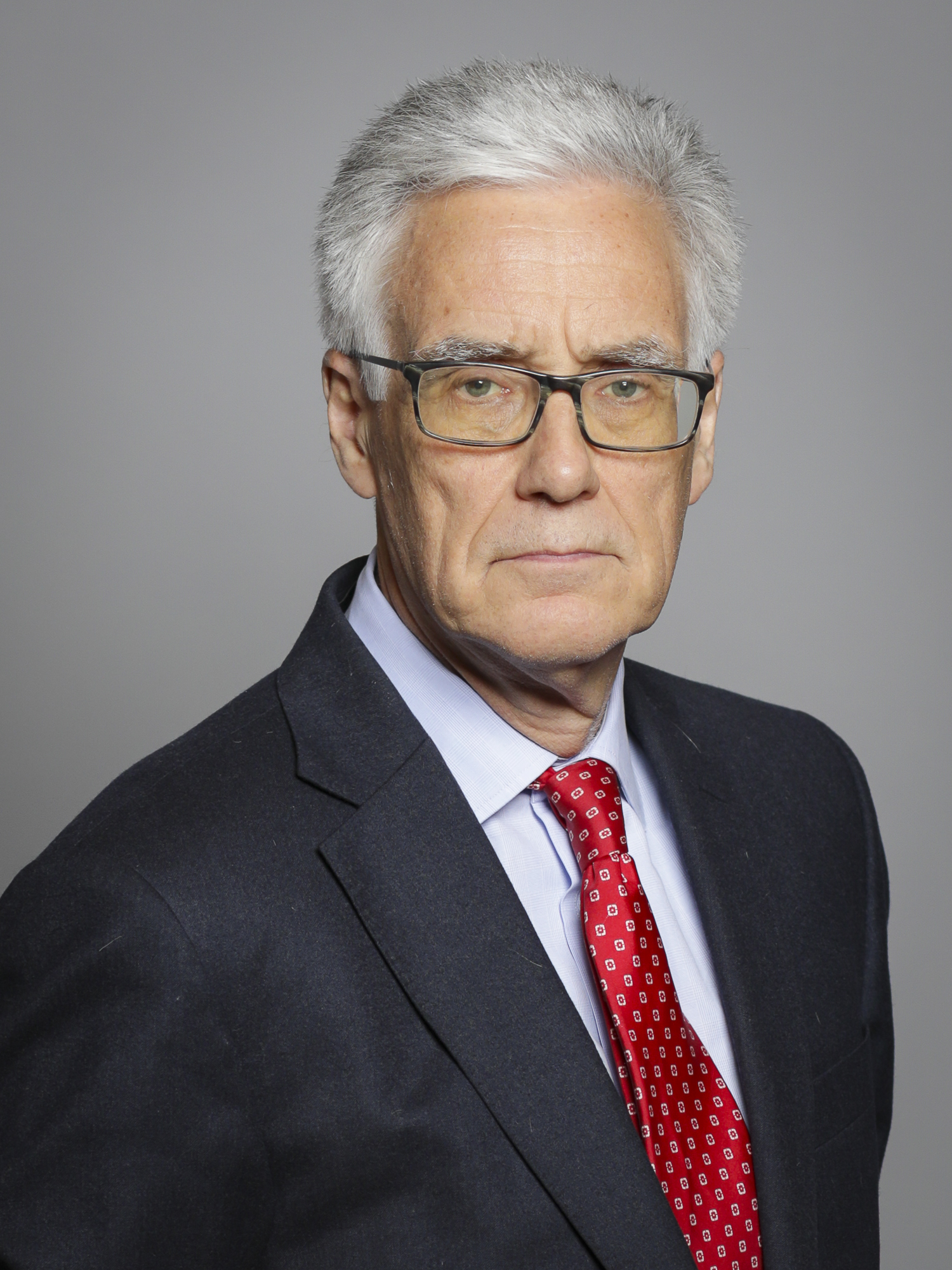
- Official portrait, 2019

Director of the Confederation of British Industry
- In office 1995–1999
- Preceded by: Howard Davies
- Succeeded by: Digby Jones

Member of the House of Lords
- Lord Temporal
- Life peerage 7 September 2005

Personal details
- Born: Jonathan Adair Turner; 5 October 1955 (age 71) Ipswich, England
- Spouse: Orna Ní Chionna
- Education: Gonville and Caius College, Cambridge

Jonathan Adair Turner, Baron Turner of Ecchinswell (born 5 October 1955) is a British businessman and academic who was Chairman of the Financial Services Authority during the 2008 financial crisis and the Great Recession, serving from September 2008 until its abolition in March 2013. He is a former chairman of the Pensions Commission and the Committee on Climate Change, as well as a former Director-General of the Confederation of British Industry. He has described himself in a BBC HARDtalk interview with Stephen Sackur as a 'technocrat'.

He is a vocal advocate of monetary financing and "helicopter money" whereby central banks would directly finance government spending or cash distribution to citizens. Since 2010, he has written monthly opinion columns on economic and regulatory policy for Project Syndicate.

== Early life ==
Adair Turner was born in Ipswich. He grew up in Crawley and East Kilbride (both new towns. His father Geoffrey was a University of Liverpool-educated town planner). Adair attended Hutchesons' Grammar School in Glasgow, then moved to Glenalmond College. He studied at Gonville and Caius College, Cambridge, where he took a Double first in History and Economics and became President of the Cambridge Union. He was also Chairman of the University's Conservative Association. He joined the Social Democratic Party (SDP) in 1981.

== Business career ==
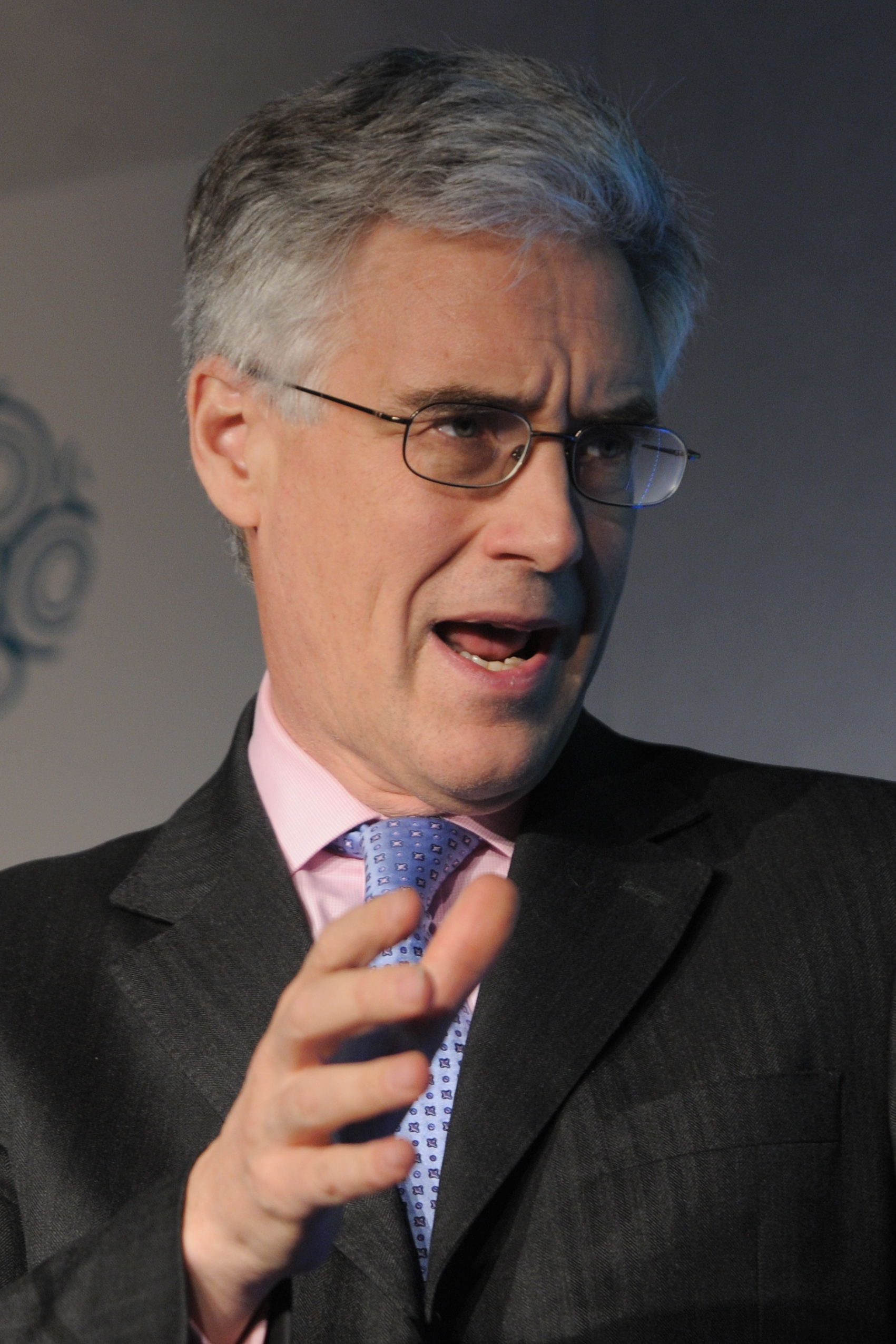
Lord Turner speaking at the CBI Climate Change Summit 2008

He taught economics part-time following university. His career with BP started in 1979 and he worked for Chase Manhattan Bank from 1979 to 1982. He became a director of McKinsey & Co in 1994 after joining in 1982. Turner was Director-General of the Confederation of British Industry (CBI) from 1995 to 1999. In this role he became one of the leading proponents of British membership of the euro – a stance he later said was mistaken. From 2000 to 2006 he was Vice-Chairman of Merrill Lynch Europe.

He lectures part-time at the London School of Economics, where in 2010 he delivered three lectures on "Economics after the Crisis", later published by MIT Press as a book under that title: this criticised conventional wisdom that the object of policy should be to maximise GDP, that the way to do this is to promote freer markets, and that inequality is an acceptable price for growth.

In 2002, he chaired a UK government enquiry into pensions. In 2007, he succeeded Frances Cairncross as Chairman of the Economic and Social Research Council and Baroness Jay as Chair of the Overseas Development Institute's Council.

In 2008, his Building a Low-carbon Economy (co-written with David Kennedy) was published, and the same year Turner was appointed as first Chairman of the British Government's newly established Committee on Climate Change. He stepped down from this position in Spring 2012.

On 29 May 2008, it was announced that he would take over as Chairman of the Financial Services Authority. He took up this post on 20 September 2008 for a five-year term to succeed Callum McCarthy.

On 27 December 2023, it was announced that Turner had been appointed as the new Chairman of OakNorth Bank.

== Financial Services Authority ==
Turner defended the actions of the regulator on the BBC's Andrew Marr show on 15 February 2009, saying that other regulatory bodies throughout the world, which varied in structure and lightness of regulatory touch, also failed to predict the economic collapse. He said that in line with other regulators the FSA had failed intellectually by focusing too much on processes and procedures rather than looking at the bigger economic picture. Asked why Sir James Crosby had been appointed deputy chairman when the FSA had said that his bank HBOS was using risky lending practices, Lord Turner said that they had files on almost every financial institution indicating a degree of risk.

He did not apologise for the actions of the FSA, which had presided over the near-total collapse of several major banks, and accepted that it had not foreseen the consequences for Lloyds Bank of its merger with the ailing HBOS in September 2008. Despite controversy over bonuses for employees of Lloyds, he sought to justify bonuses averaging 15 per cent for his own 2,500 staff, arguing "If you're saying we should now cut the bonuses [of FSA employees], you're saying you should cut their pay by 15%".

In August 2009 in an interview for Prospect magazine he supported the idea of new global taxes on financial transactions (the "Tobin tax"), warning that a "swollen" financial sector paying excessive salaries had grown too big for society.

== Institute for New Economic Thinking ==
In April 2013, it was announced that Lord Turner would be joining George Soros' economic think tank, the Institute for New Economic Thinking, as a senior research fellow in its London offices. From that, he wrote a book "Between Debt and the Devil: Money, Credit, and Fixing Global Finance".

== Monetary reform advocacy ==
=== Core philosophy on debt and credit ===
Turner's contributed to monetary reform his analysis of the relationship between debt, credit creation, and financial instability. In "Between Debt and the Devil," Turner challenges the conventional belief that credit growth is necessary to fuel economic growth, and that rising debt is acceptable as long as inflation remains low. He argues that we need to tackle addiction to debt and that most credit is not needed for economic growth, calling for a radical overhaul of financial models.

=== Helicopter money and monetary financing ===
Turner is a prominent advocate for "helicopter money" - cash transfers to households by central banks. He participated in influential policy debates on helicopter money, including a 2013 discussion at London Business School among leading monetary economists.

His advocacy for monetary financing represents a fundamental challenge to orthodox central banking, which typically maintains strict separation between monetary and fiscal policy. Turner argues monetary finance is technically feasible and can be non-inflationary.

=== Practical policy proposals ===
Turner's monetary reform proposals include specific policy recommendations:

Direct cash transfers: He advocates for central banks to make direct cash payments to households during economic downturns, financed through money creation rather than government borrowing.

Fiscal-monetary coordination: Turner proposes closer coordination between fiscal and monetary authorities to find the "right" amount of monetary finance.

Debt restructuring mechanisms: His work emphasizes the need for systematic approaches to debt reduction like debt jubilees.

Financial transaction taxes: He supports global financial transaction taxes to reduce speculative trading and generate revenue for public purposes.

=== Intellectual evolution ===
Turner's thinking on monetary reform has evolved significantly from his early career in mainstream finance. The 2008 crisis shaped his understanding of how traditional monetary and regulatory tools proved inadequate in preventing systemic collapse. This led him to embrace unconventional approaches previously considered taboo in central banking circles.

== Environment related roles ==
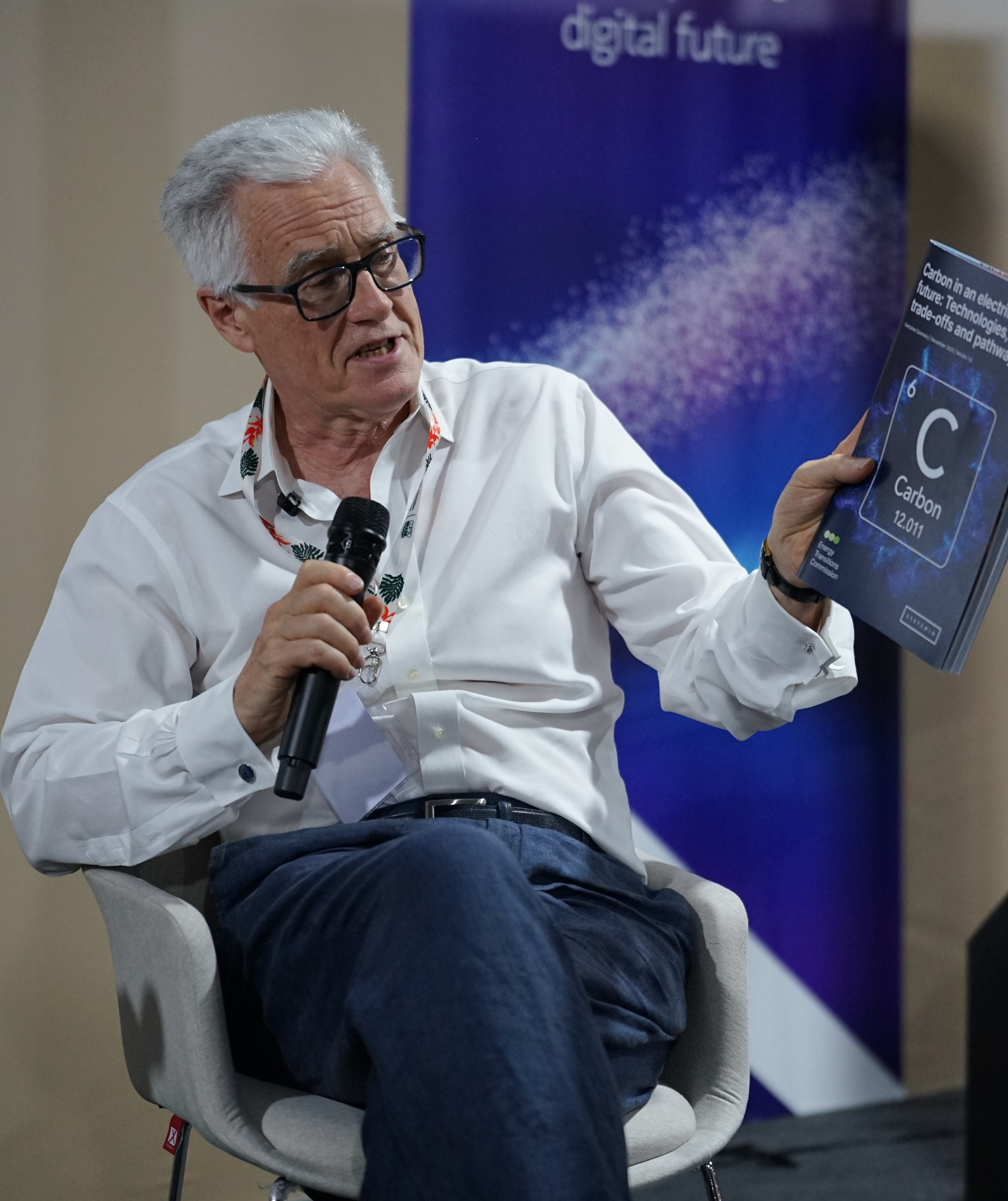
Turner presenting ETC report at COP30 (2025)

In 2015, he was co-author of the report that launched the Global Apollo Programme, which calls for developed nations to commit to spending 0.02% of their GDP for 10 years, to fund co-ordinated research to make carbon-free baseload electricity less costly than electricity from coal by the year 2025.

From 2008-2012 Turner was the first chair of the UK’s Climate Change Committee. As of 2024 he is chair of the Energy Transitions Commission (ETC), a global coalition of companies committed to achieving a net zero global economy by mid century.

== Views on human nature ==
In 2016 Turner said "I was once a confident optimist and rationalist. I also used to believe that everybody could be persuaded by rational argument. I've increasingly realised that people need mythologies, people need nationalisms and people need religions. How people get identities that provide emotional enrichment, without ending up with dangerous forms of extremism, is quite problematic."

== Honoured ==
On 7 September 2005 he was created a life peer as Baron Turner of Ecchinswell, of Ecchinswell in the County of Hampshire, awarded in recognition of his public service to the nation (he has a cottage in Ecchinswell). He sits as a crossbencher.

In 2016 he was elected an Honorary Fellow of the Royal Society.

== Personal life ==
In 1985 he married Orna Ní Chionna, whom he met at McKinsey. She comes from Ireland, and was born 1956. She was Chair of the Soil Association council and a non-executive director of Northern Foods and Royal Mail plc. Since 2023 she has been chair of the Eden Project Trust.

Political offices
Preceded by Howard Davies	Director of the Confederation of British Industry; 1995–1999	Succeeded by Digby Jones
Orders of precedence in the United Kingdom
Preceded by The Lord Rees of Ludlow	Gentlemen; Lord Turner of Ecchinswell	Followed by The Lord Turnbull
