= Climate Change Committee =

UK Climate Change public body

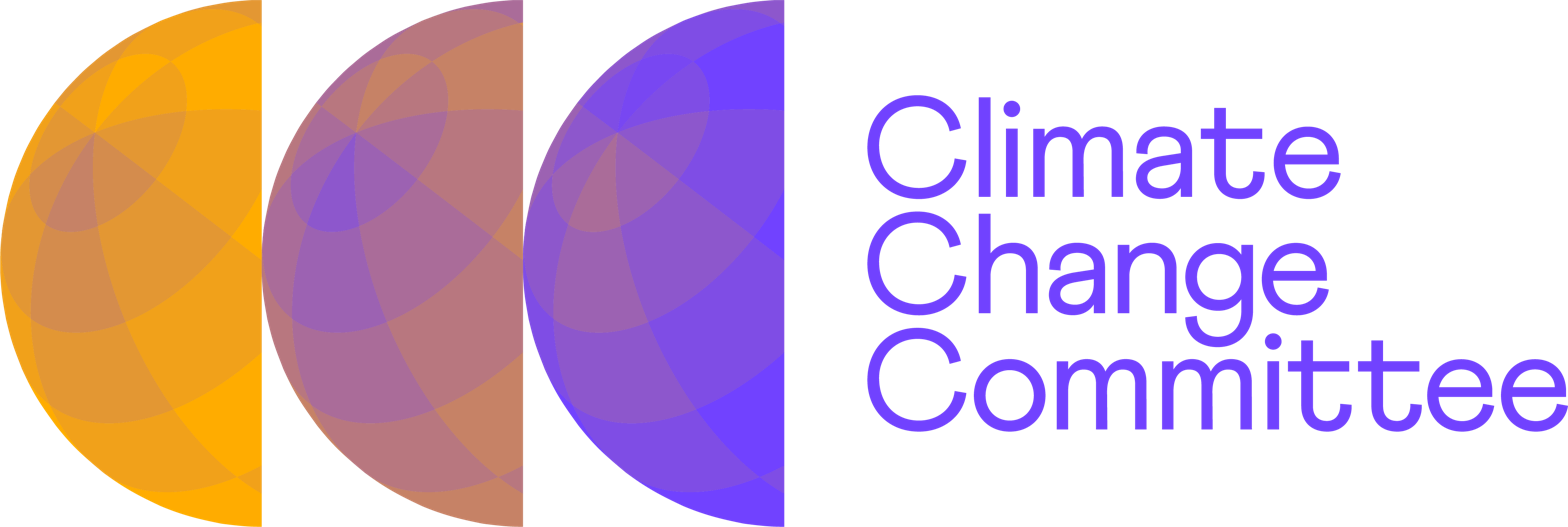
- Climate Change Committee
- Formation: December 2008; 17 years ago
- Type: Non-departmental public body
- Origins: Climate Change Act (2008)
- Region served: United Kingdom of Great Britain and Northern Ireland
- Chair: Nigel Topping
- Chief Executive: Emma Pinchbeck
- Website: https://www.theccc.org.uk/

The Climate Change Committee (CCC), originally named the Committee on Climate Change, is an independent non-departmental public body, formed under the Climate Change Act (2008) to advise the United Kingdom and devolved Governments and Parliaments on tackling and preparing for climate change. The Committee provides advice on setting carbon budgets (for the UK Government carbon budgets are designed to place a limit or ceiling on the level of economy-wide emissions that can be emitted in a five-year period), and reports regularly to the Parliaments and Assemblies on the progress made in reducing greenhouse gas emissions. Notably, in 2019 the CCC recommended the adoption of a target of net zero greenhouse gas emissions by the United Kingdom by 2050. On 27 June 2019 the British Parliament amended the Climate Change Act (2008) to include a commitment to net zero emissions by 2050. The CCC also advises and comments on the UK's progress on climate change adaptation through updates to Parliament.

== History ==
The Committee on Climate Change was formally launched as a statutory committee in December 2008 with Lord Turner as its chair.

An Adaptation Sub-Committee was set up in 2009 to provide advice to Government about adaptation, meaning the steps the government and devolved administrations of the United Kingdom should be taking to prepare for climate change impacts.

On 1 December 2008 the committee published its first major report entitled "Building a low-carbon economy – the UK's contribution to tackling climate change". This recommended that the UK adopt a long-term target to reduce emissions of all greenhouse gases by at least 80% by 2050, in order to tackle climate change. It recommended the level of three five-yearly carbon budgets to cover the periods 2008–2012, 2013-2017 and 2018–2022.

In line with the recommendations in the committee's report, in April 2009 the Government set a requirement for a 34% cut in carbon emissions by 2020.

In December 2010 the Committee recommended a 4th Carbon Budget to cover the period from 2023 to 2027. They recommended that the Government aims to cut emissions by at least 60% by 2030 to ensure that the UK is on track to meet the 2050 target, with Parliament to debate the contents and proposals of this report before the summer's recess. A recommendation on the 5th Carbon Budget was published in November 2015 and adopted by the UK Government on 30 June 2016.

In addition to reports to advise on the level of carbon budgets, the CCC also provides annual progress reports to Parliament which provide an update on Government's progress towards meeting climate targets. The CCC has published Progress Reports for 2009, 2010, and every year since. The first biennial joint progress report from the Committee on Climate Change and the Adaptation Sub-Committee was presented to the UK Parliament on 30 June 2015. The joint progress reports include an assessment of the UK Government's National Adaptation Programme by the Adaptation Sub-Committee.

The Adaptation Sub-Committee published in July 2016 the Evidence Report to inform the UK Government's second UK Climate Change Risk Assessment due to be presented to Parliament in January 2017.

On 15 October 2018, Energy and Climate Change Minister Claire Perry formally wrote to the CCC requesting advice on a date for achieving net zero greenhouse gas emissions across the economy. This came seven days after the publication of a special report by the Intergovernmental Panel on Climate Change (IPCC) on the impact of global warming of 1.5 °C above pre-industrial levels. The CCC published its advice on 2 May 2019.

In December 2020, the CCC published its advice for the sixth Carbon Budget (2033 to 2037). The sixth carbon budget is the first to be advised on since Parliament legislated for a target of Net Zero carbon emissions by 2050 in 2019. The recommended pathway is consistent with the Net Zero target and requires a 78% reduction in UK territorial emissions between 1990 and 2035. In effect, this brings forward the UK's previous 80% target by nearly 15 years. The Government formally accepted the recommendation from the CCC (965Mt of Carbon dioxide equivalent in the budgetary period 2033 to 2037) in April 2021, and Parliament passed the relevant statutory instrument in June 2021.

Separately in December 2020, following a request for advice from the Secretary of State for Business, Energy and Industrial Strategy Alok Sharma, the CCC recommended that the government adopt a commitment to reduce UK territorial carbon emissions by at least 68% from 1990 to 2030, as part of the UK's nationally determined contribution (NDC) to the UN process as specified in the Paris Agreement. Under the Paris agreement signatory countries have discretion to set their own NDCs, and some environmental activist groups had previously called for a UK NDC of a 75% reduction, whilst Professor Lord (Nicholas) Stern (speaking in an academic capacity as chair of the Grantham Institute at the London School of Economics) had suggested 70%. The Prime Minister Boris Johnson made the 69% commitment the same day as the CCC published its recommendation (3 December) and stated "We have proven we can reduce our emissions and create hundreds of thousands of jobs in the process. We are taking the lead with an ambitious new target to reduce our emissions by 2030, faster than any major economy ... The UK is urging world leaders to bring forward their own ambitious plans to cut emissions and set net zero [carbon] targets."

In December 2020, the committee was formally renamed as the Climate Change Committee.

== Members of the Committee ==
=== Members ===
The current chair is Nigel Topping. The interim chair prior to Topping's appointment was Piers Forster, who succeeded John Gummer, Lord Deben. Current committee members are:

- Nigel Topping (Chair)
- Keith Bell
- Laura Díaz Anadón
- Piers Forster
- Steven Fries
- Andrew Jordan
- Corinne Le Quéré
- Emily Norton
- Swenja Surminski

Baroness Brown is the Chair of the Adaptation Sub-Committee. The other Sub-Committee members are:

- Ian Dickie
- Chris Evans
- Hayley Fowler
- Michael Keil
- Marina Romanello

Chris Stark was chief executive of the Climate Change Committee between April 2018 and April 2024, when he was appointed chief executive of British climate change consultancy Carbon Trust.

=== Former members ===
The first chairman of the committee was Lord Turner (2008–12). Other previous Committee members include: Professor Michael Grubb (2008–2011), Lord Krebs (2009–2017), Lord May (2008–2016), and Professor Sam Fankhauser (2008–2016). David Kennedy was Chief Executive of the committee from 2008 until May 2014.

Former members of the Adaptation Sub-Committee include Professor Martin Parry (2009–2017), Professor Sam Fankhauser (2009–2017), Sir Graham Wynne (2009–2018), Dame Anne Johnson (2009–2018), Professor Jim Hall (2009–2019) and Ece Ozdemiroglu (2016-2022).

== Criticism ==
The committee was criticised in 2020 by George Monbiot for what he called its target culture, and for emphasizing planting trees commercially for bioenergy with carbon capture and storage instead of letting them regrow naturally as part of rewilding.

== Reports and key recommendations ==
Carbon budget reports

- "Building a low-carbon economy – the UK's contribution to tackling climate change – 1st December 2008"

Key recommendations:

1. The United Kingdom should reduce emissions of all Greenhouse gases by 80% by 2050
2. The first three carbon budgets (2008–2012, 2013-2017 and 2018–2022) should lead to emission reductions of 34% by 2020
3. The budgets should cover all sectors of the economy and can be achieved at a cost of 1-2% of GDP in 2050
- The Fourth Carbon Budget – Reducing emissions through the 2020s – 7 December 2010

Key recommendations:

1. Review of the latest climate science reveals that the case for action is robust
2. The fourth carbon budget should limit emissions to 1,950 MTCO2e for period 2023–2027, leading to a 60% emissions cut by 2030
3. Electricity Market Reform is urgently required, alongside appropriate policies in buildings, agriculture, transport and industry sectors
- The Fifth Carbon Budget – June 2013

The fifth statutory report to Parliament on progress towards meeting carbon budgets was published in June 2013. Implementing of loft and cavity wall insulation, boiler replacement, new car efficiency, investment in renewable power generation, and waste emissions reduction was stated to be in good progress.

- The Sixth Carbon Budget The UK's path to Net Zero – December 2020

This publication includes a report detailing the road to 'Net Zero finance' and a report by Cambridge Econometrics on the potential macroeconomic effect of the Sixth Carbon Budget and Net Zero. The macroeconomic analysis is based on a Post-Keynesian model, and suggests that UK gross domestic product will be 2-3% higher in 2050 under the pathway relative to a baseline of the continuation of existing policies.

- The Seventh Carbon Budget - February 2025

This report argued for reducing the UK's emissions to 535 MTCO2E in the period 2038-42. It argues that this target, while ambitious, is achievable through significant electrification of the energy sector, with a large uptake and roll out of EV's, heat pumps, and renewable energy sources. The benefits of this, the report argued, would be increased energy security which would protect against global fuel price shocks, new jobs in installation of green technologies and finance, and lower energy bills.

Progress reports

- Progress in reducing Emissions Report - 2025 report to Parliament:

Key recommendations:

1. Make Electricity Cheaper - shift heating costs from electric to gas, or electric to the Exchequer, or electric to both gas and taxes
2. Scale up heat pump deployment
3. Regulate against the new homes joining the gas grid
4. Increase tree planting and peatland restoration
5. Ensure the aviation industry meets emission reduction targets
- "Meeting Carbon Budgets – the need for a step change" – 12 October 2009"

Key recommendations:

1. A step change is required in the rate of emission reductions, moving from annual cuts of 0.5% to 2-3% each year
2. Rapid decarbonisation of the power sector is a priority, alongside energy efficiency improvements and reductions in road transport emissions
3. Achieving the carbon budgets is possible at low cost
- "Meeting carbon budgets – ensuring a low-carbon recovery – 30 June 2010"

Key recommendations:

1. A step change is still required
2. GHG have reduced in 2009 but this is largely due to the recession and is not as the result of underlying progress
3. New policies are required in 4 areas: electricity market reform, energy efficiency, electric cars and agriculture

UK Climate Risk reports

- UK Climate Change Risk Assessment - 2017

Key Findings:

1. The climate is changing, and this means higher risks to rising temperatures and extreme weather events.
2. The Paris Agreement is a significant step forward to helping mitigate these risks.
3. There are significant risks to coastal communities from flooding, health and wellbeing from high temperatures and water supply, international food production, and natural capital.
- Independent Assessment of UK Climate Risk - June 2021

Key Findings:

1. The gap between the level of risk and adaptation to that risk has widened.
2. The UK has the capacity to respond to these risks, however, it has not yet done so.
3. There are 8 key risk areas: Freshwater habitats, soil health, natural carbon stores, crops and livestock, supply chains of goods and services including food, the power system, increased heat exposure, and overseas impact.

Other advisory reports

- UK Aviation Report – 8 December 2009

Key recommendations:

1. Any future airport expansion should stay within a limit of increasing passenger demand by 60% by 2050
2. There is scope to reduce emissions through improving fuel efficiency and aircraft design and through operational improvements
3. Aviation emissions must be included within a UK strategy to tackle climate change
- "Scotland's path to a low-carbon economy – 24 February 2010"

Key recommendations:

1. Scotland's interim target to reduce emissions by 42% by 2020 is ambitious, but achievable
2. Flexibility should be added to system of using annual targets to reduce risk
3. The Scottish Government should set out a strategy to deliver budgets through strengthening key policies
- "Building a low-carbon economy – the UK's innovation challenge – 19 July 2010"

Key recommendations:

1. Funding for a suite of low-carbon technologies required to meet 2050 target should be protected
2. Any reduction in current funding levels (£550m per year) would increase the risk of missing carbon budgets
3. The United Kingdom should focus on developing and deploying offshore wind, marine (wave and tidal), Carbon capture and storage, smart grids and meters, electric vehicles and aviation.
- "How well prepared is the UK for climate change? – 16 September 2010"

Key recommendations:

1. The impacts of climate change are already being felt in the UK
2. The United Kingdom should act now to start to prepare itself for a warmer climate
3. Five key priority areas for action are: buildings, land-use planning, emergency planning, infrastructure and natural resources
- "The CRC Energy Efficiency Scheme – advice to Government on the second phase – 24 September 2010"

Key recommendations:

1. The scheme should be redesigned to reduce its complexity before the start of the 2nd phase
2. Separate league tables should be established for the private and public sectors
3. The sale of an unlimited number of allowances at a fixed price should be used, rather than a complex auctioning system

== See also ==
- Energy policy of the United Kingdom
- Energy in the United Kingdom
- Department of Energy and Climate Change

== External links and further reading ==
- Committee on Climate Change website
- Read the CCC's reports
- Latest news about the Committee
- CCC Blog
- Find out more about the CCC
- Contact information
- "COLUMN-UK climate act limits energy choices: Gerard Wynn"
