= Lycée Français Charles de Gaulle =

French school in London

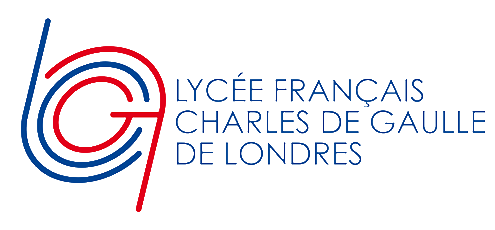

Location
- Main Campus: 35 Cromwell Road; London, SW7 2DG; United Kingdom
- 51.49530°N 0.17682°W

Information
- Type: Independent school Primary School; Secondary School
- Established: 1915
- Department for Education URN: 100547 Tables
- Head of School: Catherine Bellus-Ferreira
- Gender: Mixed
- Age: 3 to 19
- Enrollment: 3,500
- Grades: Baccalauréat; Brevet des collèges GCSE; A-Levels
- Website: lyceefrancais.org.uk

Campuses

82% of the Lycée's pupils are French.

The Lycée Français Charles de Gaulle, usually referred to as the Lycée or the French Lycée, is a French co-educational primary and secondary independent day school, situated in South Kensington in the Royal Borough of Kensington and Chelsea, London. It is managed by the Agency for French Teaching Abroad, AEFE, with its curriculum accredited by the French National Ministry of Education and overseen by the French Ministry of Foreign Affairs.

There is a "British Section" for English-speaking pupils in the secondary classes, preparing for GCSEs and A-levels. In 2008 part of the school's primary classes were transferred to a site in Fulham, the "Marie d'Orliac" school. There are three other primary "feeder" schools elsewhere in London, the André Malraux school in Ealing and Wix School in Clapham.

== Site ==
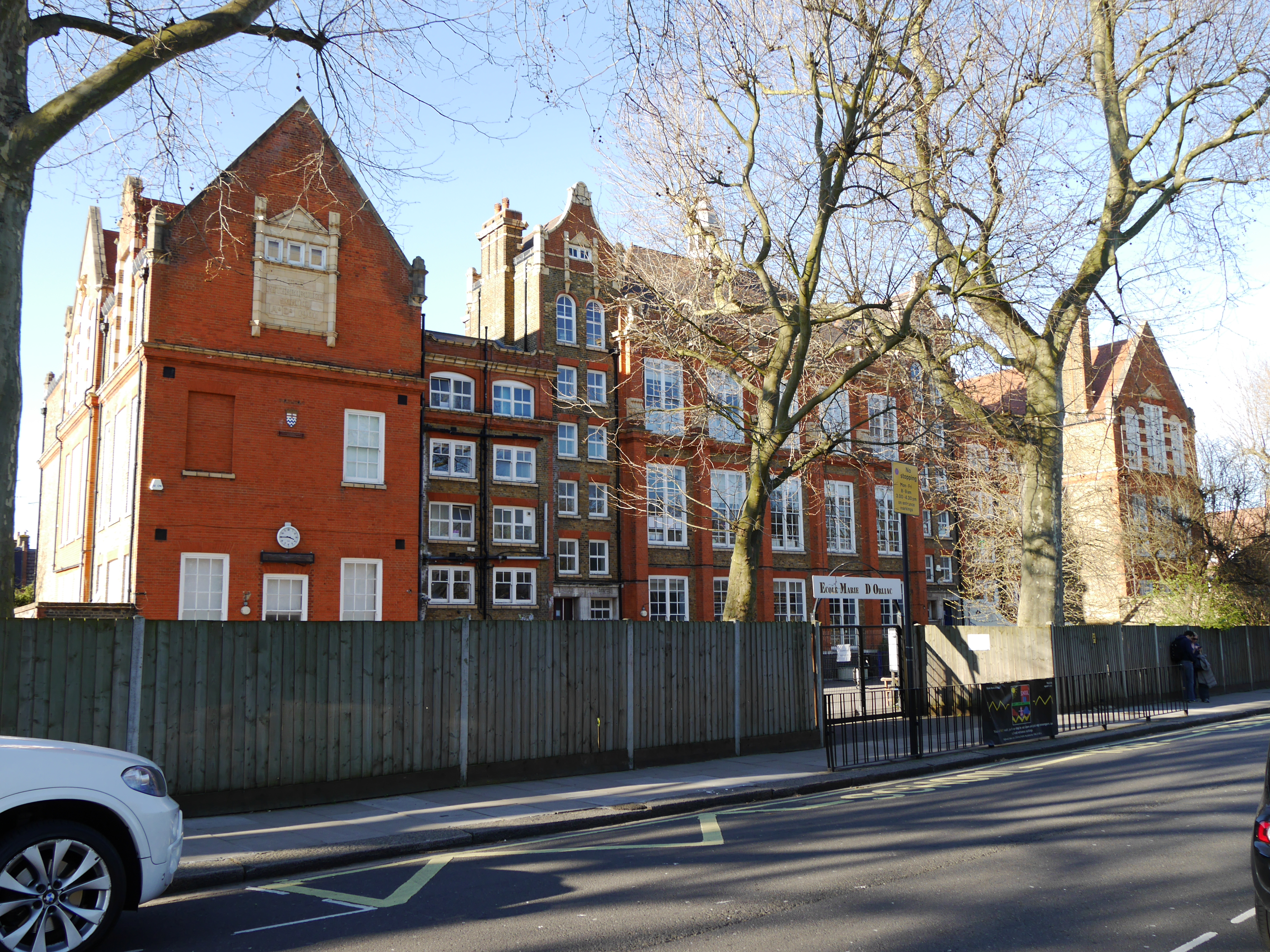
Grade II Listed Marie d'Orliac school in Fulham

The school occupies a substantial site in Cromwell Road, opposite the Natural History Museum and backs onto Harrington Road. The school was refurbished in 2008 and again in 2011. The acquisition of a lease on the Grade II listed former Peterborough School site in Clancarty Road, Fulham, has enabled part of the South Kensington primary classes to transfer there and vacate space for more secondary pupils at the main site.

== History ==
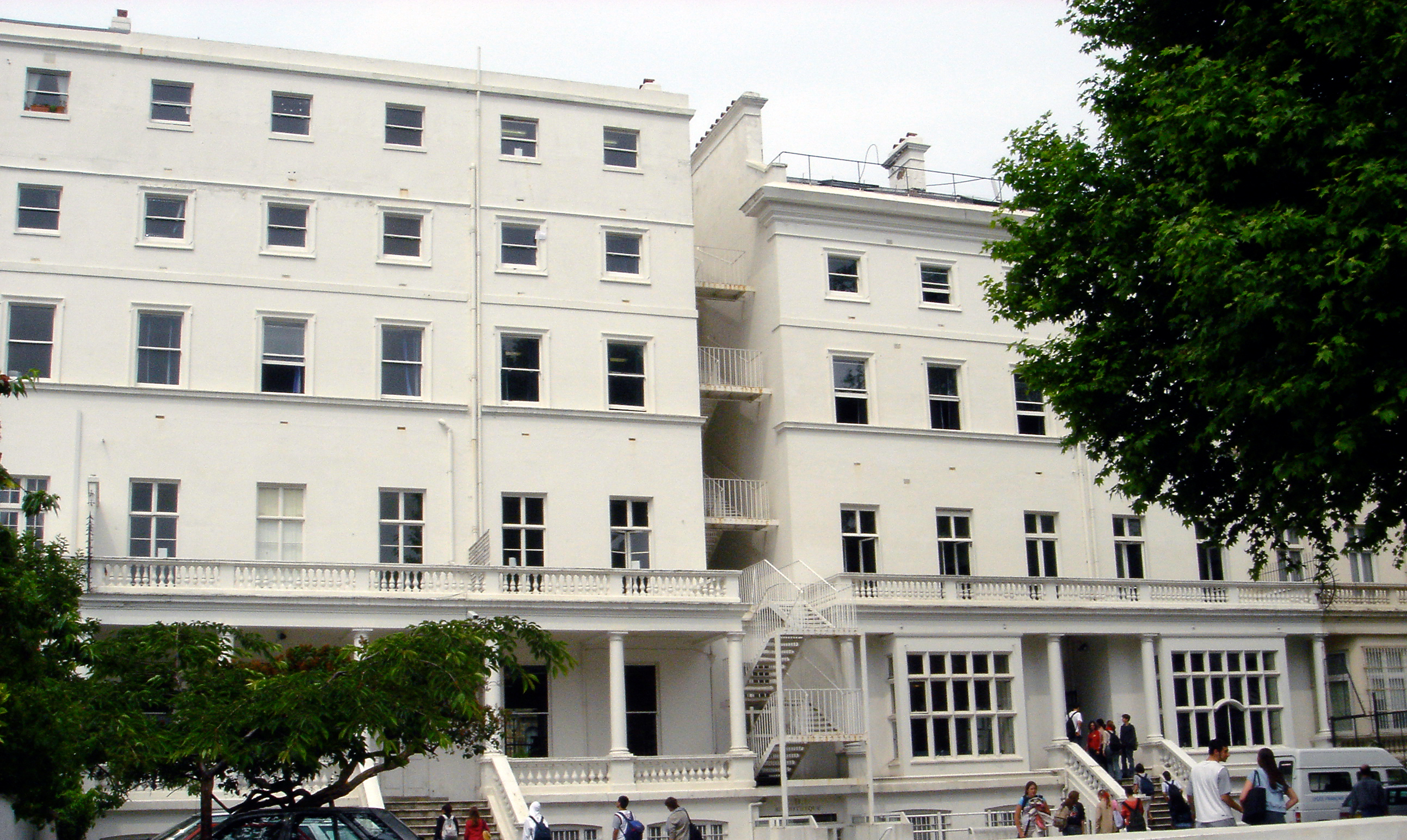
Maurois building, (British Section), 27–29 Cromwell Road.

=== Early years ===
The school was founded as the French School of London, largely through the efforts of Marie d'Orliac, with backing from the University of Lille for Belgian and other francophone World War I refugees in 1915 near London's Victoria station and provided a full education for 120 pupils. The French parents wanted to ensure that their children continued to receive a French education during World War I. The school was initially established as a response to the upheaval of war and the displacement of French families. In doing so, the French could preserve their culture and ethics despite the war. In 1920, the renamed Lycée Français de Londres relocated to Cromwell Gardens, opposite the Victoria and Albert Museum. In the late 1930s, it moved again to a Neo-Georgian style purpose-built school building (AJ Thomas, assistant to EL Lutyens), adjacent to the Université des lettres françaises (French Institute) in Queensberry Place – another d'Orliac project – with its own entrance in Queensberry Mews. The aesthetics displayed in the architecture of Patrice Bonnet's 1939 French Institute were translated into small touches like the Art Deco designs of the termly "Tableau d'honneur" cards, (the roll of honour) given to pupils deemed to have worked hard. The designs became utilitarian in the fifties.

During the Second World War, the Lycée pupils and their teachers were evacuated to Cumberland. The London buildings became offices for the Free French government in exile of General de Gaulle. Bombing raids on London destroyed buildings adjacent to the Lycée.

=== After World War II ===
Post-war development of the school was overseen by M. Augustin Gaudin, the Proviseur (headmaster), supported by his wife. The school and the French Institute were initially seen as largely synonymous, and remained heavily interdependent in the post-war years, and into the 1970s. Their close relations came to an end with French administrative reforms and the introduction of modern management and accounting techniques in the 1980s. Another notable feature of the time was that Lille University offered a first year of their humanities programme at the Lycée, for those completing the Terminales classes and arranged exchanges for teachers as well as pupils.

The school saw steady expansion during the post-war "baby boom". In 1947 three junior classes (jardin d'enfants, 12e and 11e) had opened in adapted rented accommodation at 29 The Boltons SW10, on the corner with Tregunter Road. The establishment formed a succursale (satellite) of the Lycée for a period of 15 years, and was known simply as "The Boltons". In 1952 an "English Section" for British or UK-based pupils was established: it was later renamed the "British Section". The bombed terraces directly opposite the Natural History Museum on Cromwell Road, which had been temporarily converted into tennis courts, were acquired by the French government, and a major development of this site was undertaken between 1955 and 1957. New facilities included modern science laboratories and multipurpose classrooms, and a spacious entrance hall at 35 Cromwell Road. The corner of Cromwell Road and Cromwell Place was occupied by the Royal College of Art, but after the Royal College moved to purpose-built premises on Kensington Gore in the 1980s, further terraced houses were gradually acquired by the French Government. Another temporary succursale in the Swinging Sixties was no. 6 Cromwell Place, SW7, home of the then "English section", watched over by Mme Thérèse Wright. Close neighbours in Cromwell Place were the French Institute's noted bi-lingual Secretarial College and the Alliance Française. In the days before IT, the Lycée library and yearly issue and collection of school textbooks – an enormous logistical exercise – was managed by Mme Betty Galitzine and later by Mme Babette Willmot. For decades, the Lycée's French stationery was procured by Neilson's in Harrington Road.

As the school grew, so the kitchens faced an increasing logistical challenge to produce upwards of 2000 hot meals daily on Lycée monogrammed china.

=== 1960s ===
In 1962, President de Gaulle returned to the Lycée for a final visit, and was greeted by the entire school.

With the lull in construction, the school increased its interest in the arts, science, sport and travel. In 1966 a Lycée excursion was led by Mme Raphael to Paris to view the Picasso Retrospective exhibition at the Grand Palais. There were annual organised trips to Val d'Isère and Courchevel for skiing in spring, a Summer School in Pont Saint-Esprit, led by Jacques Iselin and tours of the Soviet Union in association with Dr. Sanger of Westminster School. The return by rail from one such trip was briefly, though alarmingly, delayed by the Soviet led Warsaw Pact invasion of Czechoslovakia. Pupils put on plays, mostly in French, at the Institute's theatre (now the Ciné Lumière) and art exhibitions in the entrance halls of the 'Institut' and 35 Cromwell Road. The languages offered through the parallel curricula were Ancient Greek and Latin, German, Italian, Russian and Spanish. 'English Section' pupils took part in British school competitions in the recitation of Latin verse. Other pupils were successful in writing competitions organised by the Alliance Française. With the help of former Olympic standard PE teachers, the Lycée was noted for its competitive prowess on the sports field, in the water and in the gym: handball, rugby, basketball, tennis, even cricket (a French invention!), rowing, swimming, fencing and horse-riding.

Each year, there was a steady stream of applicants to Oxbridge and to the Grandes écoles and places taken up to study architecture, economics, engineering, medicine, music and science in France, the UK and the USA. To underscore the importance of Franco-British understanding, the Alliance Française annually sponsored a special award to one pupil for "Camaraderie Franco-Britannique".

The wave of student revolutions of 1968 brought about changes in the French educational system which were also felt in South Kensington. One change was the abolition of the Lycée's annual ceremonial prize-giving (originally in the Royal Festival Hall), latterly at the more convenient Royal Albert Hall. The ceremony used to be marked by an organ recital by the school's Master of Music, the former Notre Dame de Paris organist and composer Jean Dattas. This was followed by speeches from noted French academics. French ministries and businesses would sponsor generous expenditure on books which were then distributed as prizes to pupils of merit. The 1970s brought in their wake a Counterculture with its complex attitude to drug use. Like many other teaching establishments, the Lycée had its share of problems.

=== Late twentieth century ===
The continuing expansion of the school led to further occupation of the mews complex behind Cromwell Place. In the mid 1960s, there had still been horses stabled in the mews, and equine odours invaded classrooms on the east side of the site. The erection in 1984 of the Primary School building to Roeven Vardi's design, in the playground on Harrington Road, allowed the primary classes to be decanted out of their cramped conditions in Queensberry Place.

In 1980, the school was renamed the Lycée Français Charles de Gaulle, for the late French President, who had established his wartime offices in the decanted Lycée buildings.

Due to limited space at the South Kensington site, the Lycée opened two "feeder" primary schools, based in Clapham and Ealing, in 1993 and 1995 respectively. Since May 1997, the Ealing "satellite" has been known as the École André Malraux, named after the French author and politician.

== Present day ==
2015 was the school's centenary. It symbolised the longevity of one cultural aspect of Franco-British cooperation along with its associated Grade II listed French Institute, a site of remarkable architectural heritage, the Ciné Lumiére, the Alliance Française and the French Embassy all in close proximity in the UK's capital.

The Lycée caters for some 4,000 pupils between the ages of 3 and 19. The school is an important cultural centre for London's sizeable French-speaking community and one of the most academically successful French schools outside France. In addition to serving the francophone communities in London, 9% of pupils at the Lycée are English-speaking or of British heritage, placed in the school by parents opting for a bilingual education for their children. The Lycée continues to maintain a multicultural and international mix of pupils, from over 50 different nationalities.

The school charges fees that are subsidised by the French government in the case of French nationals only.

The teaching medium at the Lycée is predominantly French and follows French curricula. However, when pupils reach the troisième form, (equivalent to Year Ten or first year), they can opt either to stay in the French stream, as the majority do, and study for the Brevet and the Baccalauréat, or follow the modified English stream (64 students per year) and work towards GCSEs and A-levels. The Lycée's "British Section" has tended to achieve good exam results (see Academic results below) and has enabled pupils to enter Russell Group universities in the UK or universities abroad.

Winter sports uniform (left) and summer sports uniform (right).

The Lycée maintains a strong commitment to sport and takes part in competitions with British schools, particularly in basketball and rugby. The school has always put an accent on developing artistic talent alongside academic achievement. There is a very active art department and a school orchestra.

On 15 March 2020, the Lycée announced that the school in South Kensington and all of its London satellite locations would suspend lessons due to the COVID-19 pandemic: this was in line with policy in France, whereas most British schools remained open for a further week.

=== Polling station ===
The Lycée's building in South Kensington has been used repeatedly as a site for expatriate French citizens to cast their vote in French elections.

== Academic results ==
The entire school is subject to British Ofsted inspections to assess its overall performance, governance and the development and welfare of pupils including Safeguarding. The latest inspection conducted in October 2024 assessed the school as "Good" overall and "Outstanding" in the quality of education .

=== French Baccalauréat ===
The Lycée Français Charles de Gaulle is one of the best French schools abroad as shown by its outstanding results: Baccalauréat results 2021

- Percentage of honours "Mention Très Bien": +64% of the students.
- Percentage of honours "Mention Bien": 26,5% of the students.
- Percentage of honours "Mention Assez Bien": 7,7% of the students.
- Percentage of total honours : 98,7% of the students.

=== British Section ===
In 2008, the English Section of the Lycée was ranked 15th in the Financial Times schools league table. It was ranked 16th in The Times schools league table.

2021 A Level results:

- 100% of students received their A-levels
- 78.3% received A*+A (The national average being of 44.3%)
- 13.2% obtained a B
- 8.5% of students obtained their A-levels with a C or E

=== Heads of the British Section ===
- Anthony Morgan (1958–1979)
- Alan Harrison (1979–1994)
- Rachide Bennamar (1994–2000)
- Rosalind Nichol (2000–2010)
- Kelvin Zane (2010–2016)
- Simon McNaught (2016–2025)
- Jill Beyton (2025-current)

== Alumni Association ==
There is an active alumni association, "Les Anciens du Lycée Français Charles de Gaulle de Londres" which organises events throughout each year. Together with the school, it celebrated the diamond jubilee of the "British Section" in 2012 in the presence of the British Secretary of State for Education and the French Ambassador.

== Notable former pupils and teachers ==
- Annabel Astor, (née Jones), businesswoman (mother-in-law of David Cameron)
- Luis de Avendaño y Fisher,
- Marie-Christine Barrault, actress
- Jacqueline Bisset, actress
- Sir Quentin Blake CH, English teacher, artist, cartoonist and illustrator and Chevalier dans l'Ordre de la Légion d'Honneur
- John Yeoman, English teacher, author of children's books
- Gyles Brandreth, former Conservative MP, TV and radio personality
- Joan Juliet Buck, Paris Vogue editor, writer, actor
- Jennifer Caron Hall, actress, artist and singer-songwriter
- Matthew Carrington, former Conservative MP, Peer
- Michel de Carvalho, actor, Olympian and Tycoon
- G. Marius Clore FMedSci, FRS, molecular biophysicist and structural biologist at the US National Institutes of Health, Member of the United States National Academy of Sciences
- Jasmine Cresswell, author Sciences
- Tom Delay CBE, climate economist
- Kay Dick, author
- Dame Vivien Duffield DBE, philanthropist
- Melissa Franklin, experimental particle physicist, Professor of Physics at Harvard
- Professor Maurice Fraser. Academic, Special advisor and Légion d'honneur recipient.
- Adam Gatehouse, conductor, founder of the New Generation Artists scheme and the Wigmore Hall lunchtime concert series, joint artistic director of the Leeds International Piano Competition
- Sheherazade Goldsmith (née Bentley), environmentalist and author
- Chantal Goya, singer and actress
- Dominic Grieve, former Conservative MP and Attorney-General
- Murray Head, actor, singer, documentary film writer, director and producer
- Alexandre Holroyd, French politician, member of the French National Assembly
- Oliver Jackson-Cohen, actor
- Jennifer Jankel, businesswoman and chair of the Jewish Music Institute
- Roland Joffé, film director
- Ben Judah, journalist and writer
- Terence Judd (1957-1979), musical prodigy and pianist
- India Knight, writer
- Dimitri Kullmann FRS, academic neurologist
- Francine Lacqua, news presenter
- Dame Hermione Lee DBE, academic and President of Wolfson College Oxford
- Edward Leigh, Conservative MP
- Claude Littner, businessman, star of BBC's The Apprentice
- Lady Olga Maitland, former Conservative MP
- Catherine Meyer, Baroness Meyer, (née Laylle)
- Dorothée Munyaneza, singer, dancer, actor and choreographer
- Catherine Oxenberg, actress
- Christina Oxenberg, writer
- Michael Holbrook Penniman Jr., singer-songwriter
- Paloma Picasso, designer
- Gail Rebuck DBE, Labour Peer, publisher
- Alix Wilton Regan, actor
- Natasha Richardson, actress
- Gavin Salam FRS, Physicist at CERN
- Bill Tchato, professional footballer
- Daniel Topolski (1945-2015), rowing coach and commentator, writer
- Frances de la Tour, actress
- Arabella Weir, comedian, actress and writer
- Christian Wolmar, journalist, writer, railway historian and politician
- Anthony Yadgaroff, entrepreneur, Plc chairman, community activist

== In popular culture ==
- The BBC's first TV adaptation in 1963 of Charlotte Brontë's Jane Eyre, featured Nicole Church, Lycée pupil and daughter of Mme Church, Latin and French teacher, as the child heroine. Jane Eyre, a BBC series starring Richard Leech and Ann Bell
