= Laurence Tubiana =

French economist and diplomat (born 1951)

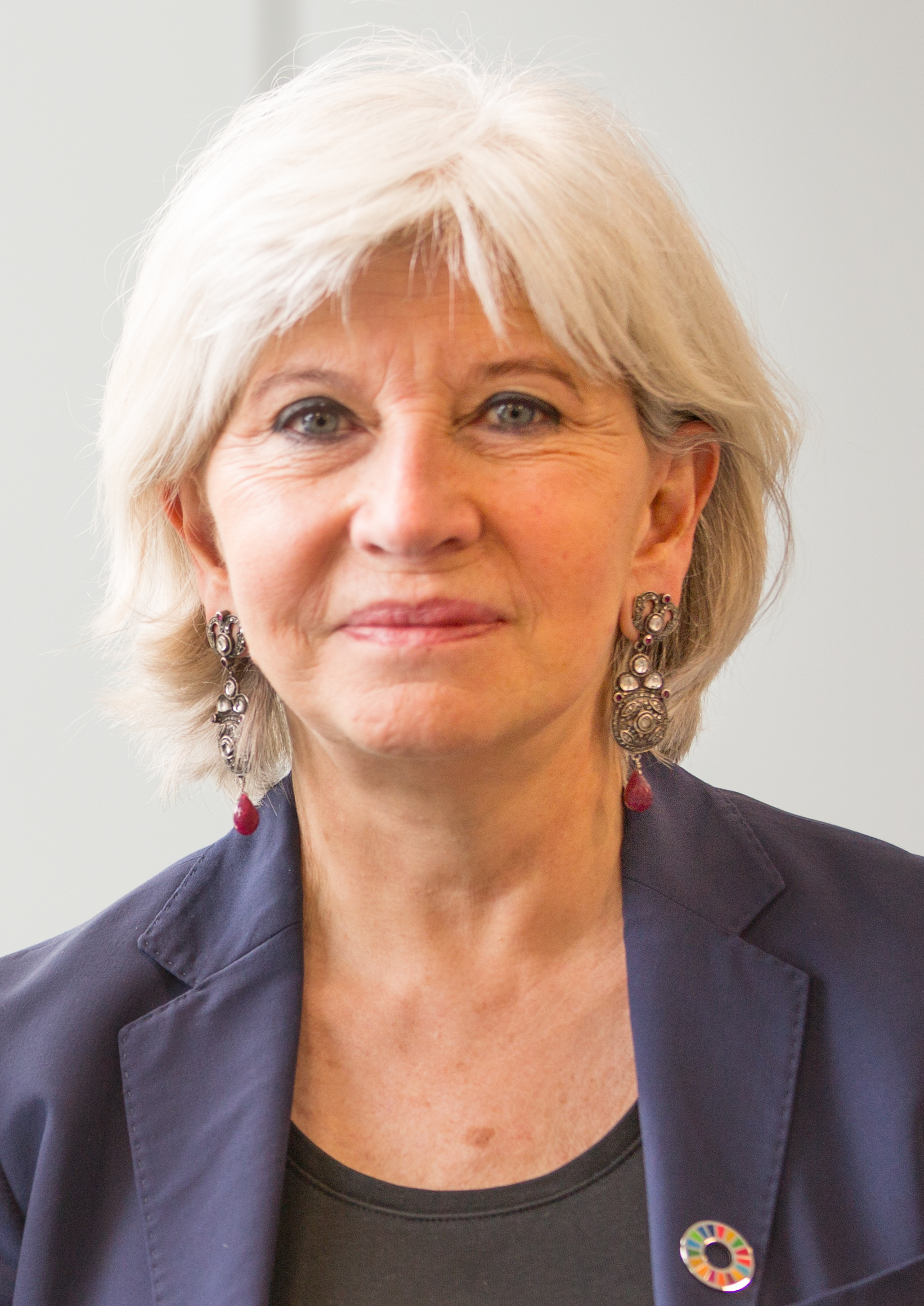
- Tubiana in 2016

Dean of the Paris Climate School of Sciences Po
- Incumbent
- Assumed office 1 July 2025
- Preceded by: Position established

CEO of the European Climate Foundation
- Incumbent
- Assumed office March 2017
- Preceded by: Johannes Meier

Chair of the Board of Directors of the French Development Agency
- In office 2013–2022

President of the Institute of Sustainable Development and International Relations
- In office 2002–2014
- Preceded by: Position established
- Succeeded by: Teresa Ribera

Personal details
- Born: Émilie Laurence Tubiana; 5 July 1951 (age 75) Oran, French Algeria
- Citizenship: France
- Party: Independent
- Other political affiliations: Revolutionary Communist League (1968–1976)
- Children: 2
- Education: Sciences Po; Paris 1 Panthéon-Sorbonne University
- Occupation: Economist • Professor • Diplomat • Civil servant
- Awards: Legion of Honour

Émilie Laurence Tubiana (French pronunciation: [lɔʁɑ̃s tybjana]; born 5 July 1951) is a French economist, professor and diplomat. She served as France's Climate Change Ambassador and Special Representative for the 2015 COP21 Climate Change Conference in Paris, for which she became recognised as a key architect of the resulting Paris Agreement. Since 2017, she has been CEO of the European Climate Foundation.

Tubiana co-founded the Paris-based Institute of Sustainable Development and International Relations (IDDRI) in 2001, which she headed from 2002 to 2014, is a professor at Sciences Po, as well as has previously served as senior adviser on the environment to the former Prime Minister Lionel Jospin. She has been responsible for conducting international environmental negotiations for the French government and has also been a member of the Conseil d'Analyse Économique attached to the Prime Minister's office. Between 2013 and 2022 she was chair of the Board of Directors of the French Development Agency (AFD).

Most recently, she served as Special Envoy to COP30 for Europe.

== Early life and education ==
Tubiana was born in Oran, Algeria, in 1951. Her father, an entrepreneur with interests in tobacco and the cinema, came from an established Jewish Algerian family. Her mother and grandmother were Greek Catholic immigrants and early importers of modern Swedish furniture in Algeria. Thanks to her parents, both French-speaking, left-wing intellectuals, she developed an interest in politics and open discussion from an early age.

Tubiana was 11 when Algeria gained independence in 1962. Together with her family, she moved to France. In May 1968, like many teenagers of the times, she joined the Revolutionary Communist League.

Tubiana graduated from Sciences Po in 1973 and obtained a doctorate in economics from the Université Paris I (Sorbonne) in 1976. She then set about taking the entrance examination for the Institut national de la recherche agronomique (INRA), the French National Agricultural Research Institute.

== Career ==
=== 1980s–1990s ===
Tubiana worked as an assistant to the then economics professor Lionel Jospin, at the University Technology Institute in Sceaux.

In the 1980s, she founded and headed Solagral, an NGO involved in issues of north–south cooperation, food and agriculture.

In 1997, when Jospin became prime minister after the 1997 legislative election, she was his environmental adviser. She helped him with the negotiations for the Kyoto Protocol in 1997. She was also a member of the French Economic Analysis Council (Conseil d'analyse économique) attached to the Prime Minister's office. In 2000, she was appointed Inspector General of Agriculture.

Tubiana was also Research Director at INRA (1995–2002) and an associate professor at the École nationale supérieure agronomique in Montpellier (1992–1997).

=== 2000s ===
In 2001, Tubiana founded the Institute for Sustainable Development and International Relations (Institut du développement durable et des relations internationales – IDDRI) and in 2003 was appointed Professor and Director of the Sustainable Development Chair at Sciences Po. She was also a visiting professor at Columbia University's School of International and Public Affairs (2004–2014).

Tubiana assisted the French authorities with preparations for the 2009 COP15 climate change conference in Copenhagen.

In May 2009, she created and then led Directorate for Global Public Goods at the French Ministry of Foreign Affairs.

=== 2010s ===
Ahead of the 2012 presidential election, Tubiana co-signed an appeal of several economists in support of candidate François Hollande.

In 2012, Tubiana became a member of France's high-level steering committee on the Energy Transition Debate whose work led to the adoption the French Energy Transition Law in 2015. From 2012 to 2014, she co-chaired the Leadership Council of the Sustainable Development Solutions Network and co-chaired the network's working group on Deep Decarbonization Pathways. She has also been a member of the China Council for International Cooperation on Environment and Development (CCICED) since 2002.

In 2014, Tubiana was appointed France's Climate Change Ambassador and Special Representative for the 2015 COP21 Climate Change Conference in Paris. She is viewed as a key architect of the Paris Agreement on climate change, adopted by the parties to the United Nations Framework Convention on Climate Change (UNFCCC) on 12 December 2015. In 2016, Tubiana was appointed High-Level Champion for pre-2020 climate action to sustain the momentum generated by the Paris Agreement, alongside Hakima El Haité.

=== Current functions ===
Tubiana has been CEO of the European Climate Foundation since 2017. She was appointed a member of France's High Council on Climate Change in 2018. She is Chair of Expertise France's Board and President of the French Environment & Energy Management Agency's (ADEME) Scientific Council. From 2013 to 2022, she served as chair of the Board of Directors of the French Development Agency (AFD).

On 1 July 2025, Tubiana was named the inaugural Dean of the Paris Climate School at Sciences Po.

== COP21 and the Paris Agreement ==
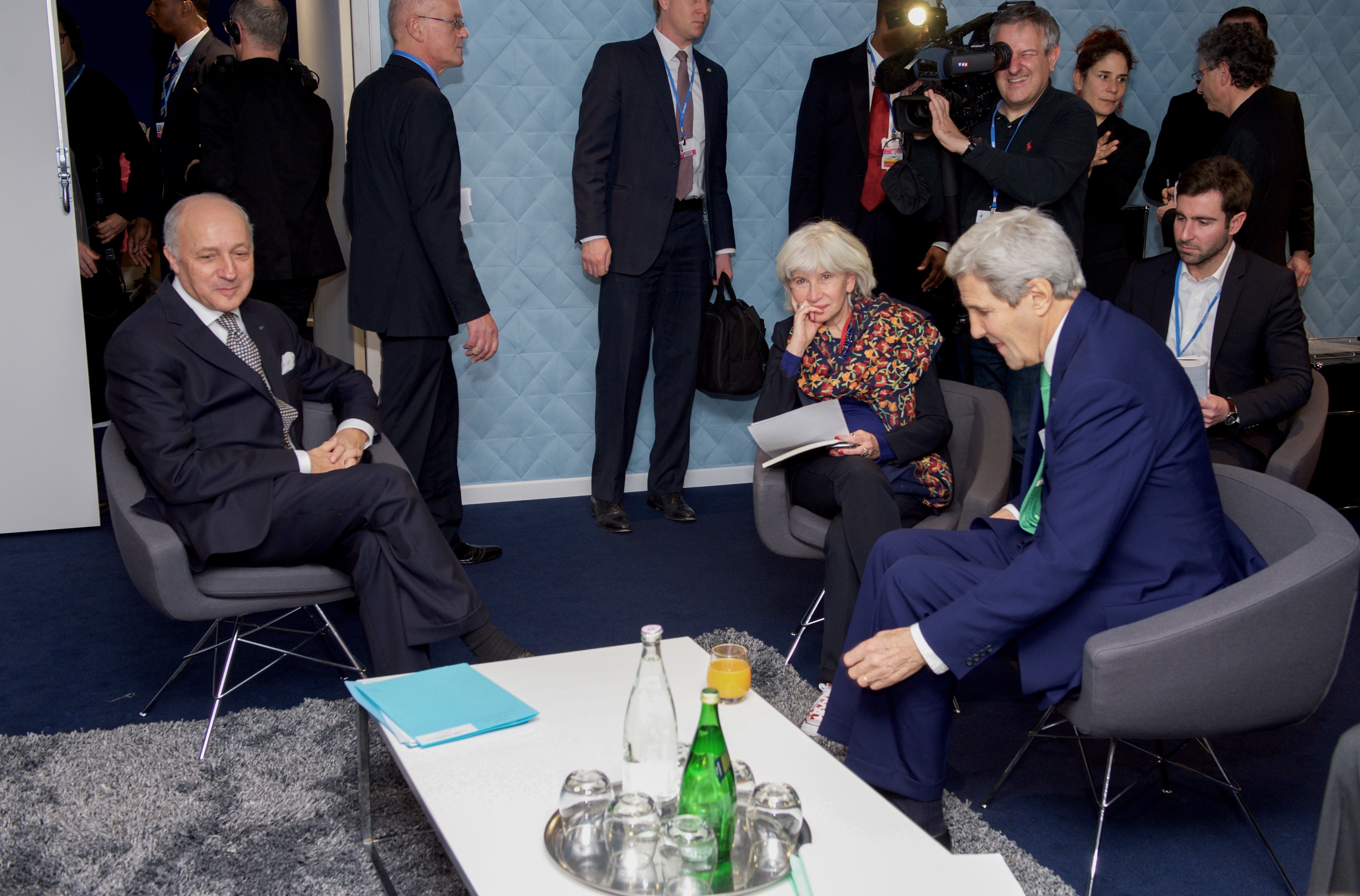
Tubiana with John Kerry and Laurent Fabius, 7 December 2015

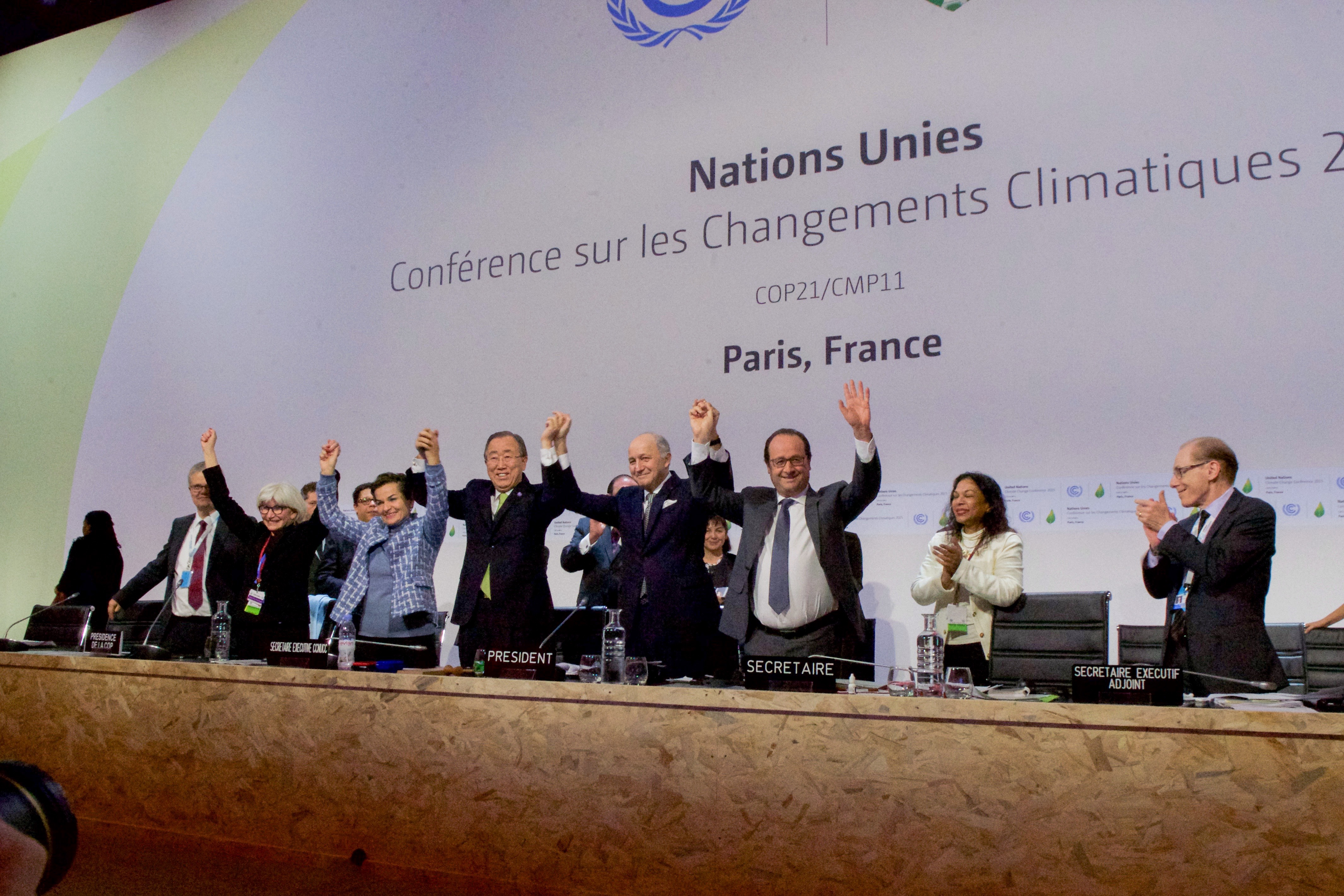
Tubiana (left) with dignitaries at the final session of COP21

On 15 May 2014, in view of her extensive international expertise on climate issues, Laurent Fabius, French Minister of Foreign Affairs, invited Tubiana to be his representative for the COP21 Paris climate conference. As she explained in a Women of 2015 interview with the Financial Times, Tubiana was then in New York, working as a visiting professor at Columbia University. Despite the enormous amount of work the position of special ambassador would entail, she immediately accepted the offer. Her appointment as Special Ambassador was confirmed at the meeting of the Council of Ministers on 3 June 2014. Over the next 18 months, she worked days from 7 am to almost midnight and took around 45 trips to meet ministers and business groups around the world. Her strategy, which proved successful, was based on encouraging countries to come up with their own plans for adopting domestic policies to provide for action on climate change.

Before the conference, Tubiana explained her views on global warming: "It's a fascinatingly complex topic... Conditions today are unsustainable and unbalanced, favouring attitudes and levels of consumption which are harmful for us all. The driving force for me is the very idea of justice".

It was Tubiana who suggested inviting the heads of state to the opening of the conference, avoiding the problems faced at COP15 in Copenhagen when they came in at the end. With responsibilities for meals and lighting, she also relaxed the dress code, creating a convivial atmosphere for the delegates. She herself negotiated the corridors of the conference site in sneakers rather than high heels after a horse-riding accident. She had also spent two days in hospital with appendicitis just a week before the conference started. Tubiana was given much of the credit for managing the negotiations, which resulted in the agreement of 195 countries to a final text which went far beyond earlier expectations.

A few days after the conference, Tubiana emphasised its most important outcomes, several of which went significantly beyond the initial goals. They included limiting warming "to well below 2°C and pursuing efforts to limit the temperature increase to 1.5°C" rather than to 2 °C before the meeting. Just a few countries covering only 15% of greenhouse gas emissions were initially required to come up with concrete policies. After the meeting, all but the poorest countries were included. Financial institutions were also increasingly required to take account of climate change in their investments. As a result of the meeting, new energy technologies would enjoy unexpected levels of development, with ever more joint ventures between national administrations and private companies.

== Recognition ==
- 2008 – Officer of the Legion of Honour.

== Selected publications ==
- Henry, C., & Tubiana, L. (2017). Earth at Risk: Natural Capital and the Quest for Sustainability. Columbia University Press. ISBN 9780231162524.
- Pachauri, Rajendra K.; Paugam, Anne; Ribera, Teresa; Tubiana, Laurence (2014). Building the future we want. The Energy and Resources Institute (TERI). ISBN 978-81-7993-575-0.
- Grosclaude, Jean-Yves; Tubiana, Laurence; Pachauri, Rajendra K. (2014). A Planet for Life 2014. Teri Press.
