= David Kennedy (economist) =

British economist

- Born: 29 September 1969 (age 57)
- Citizenship: United Kingdom
- Organization: Science Based Targets initiative (SBTi)
- Spouse: Philippa Stonebridge
- Children: 3

Academic background
- Education: University of Sheffield; University of Manchester; London School of Economics

Academic work
- Discipline: Economics; Climate change
- Institutions: Committee on Climate Change

David Kennedy, CB, CBE (born 29 September 1969) is a British economist. He was the founding Chief Executive of the UK's statutory climate change body, the Committee on Climate Change from 2007 until 2014, and then the Director General for Economic Development at the Department for International Development from 2014 to 2017.

Kennedy subsequently served as the Director General for Food, Biosecurity and Trade at the Department for Environment, Food and Rural Affairs from 2017 to 2023.

Upon leaving the civil service, he became a partner at EY. In 2025, Kennedy became the CEO of the Science Based Targets initiative (SBTi), a global climate change mitigation collaboration.

Kennedy was awarded a CBE in 2015 for services to climate change, and a CB in 2021, for public service during Covid.

== Life ==
The son of Peter and Anne Kennedy, he was educated at the University of Sheffield, where he gained a BA degree in Economics and Econometrics, then at the University of Manchester, graduating MA in Economics, and then at the London School of Economics where he took a PhD in Economics in 1995. His doctoral thesis was titled The economics of London bus tendering.

Kennedy was a research fellow at the London School of Economics from 1993 to 1996, then worked briefly a consultant at the Centre for Regulated Industries in 1996–1997, before joining the European Bank for Reconstruction and Development as a Senior Economist, leading on infrastructure and energy, as well as doing macroeconomic analysis and country risk assessments.

In 2003 he moved to the World Bank, where he remained until 2006, leading investments and policy reform in various Balkan countries and development of a Balkans energy market.

In 2007 he was appointed as founding Chief Executive of the Committee on Climate Change, where he led design of the UK's carbon framework. Of his time there, Lord Deben commented that "He is the best kind of civil servant; intellectually robust and technically proficient, bringing sound judgment and careful evaluation to every issue. We owe him a great debt for a job well done." Kennedy commented that he was leaving with a good deal of sadness.

In June 2014 he became the first Director General for Economic Development at the Department for International Development. In this role he developed a new approach to mobilising FDI for clean infrastructure, agriculture and manufacturing in the poorest countries of Africa and Asia, and was responsible for the UK's interests in the World Bank and other IFIs.

At Defra, he was responsible for ensuring food security through Brexit and Covid, designed new border arrangements for food, plants and animals for the UK and Northern Ireland, led post-Brexit farm reforms, and food chapters of trade deals.

At EY he built a new practice advising large corporates on carbon strategy, planning and transformation.

== Private life ==
In 2001, Kennedy married Philippa Stonebridge, and they have one daughter, two sons and a cat called Blu. In Who's Who he gives his recreations as "kids, classical clarinet, jazz saxophone, literature, Manchester City".

== Selected publications ==
- Building a Low-carbon Economy, 2008, with Adair Turner
- Meeting Carbon Budgets: the need for a step change, 2009
- many articles on energy, infrastructure, and climate change
