= Pompeian, Inc. =

American food company

Pompeian, Inc. is a food company that was founded in Baltimore in 1906 and produced America's first national brand of imported extra virgin olive oil. Today Pompeian offers a line of olive oils, including Robust Extra Virgin, Smooth Extra Virgin, Organic Extra Virgin, Classic Pure and Extra Light Tasting varieties. Pompeian has the number one selling extra virgin olive oil, olive oil, balsamic vinegar, wine vinegar and grapeseed oil, and offers a wide variety of cooking oils, vinegars, cooking wines and cooking sprays nationwide. Pompeian also carries several Organic products, including Organic Extra Virgin Olive Oil, Organic Balsamic Vinegar and Organic Red Wine Vinegar.

== History ==
The Pompeian company was started in Lucca, Italy in the late 1800s. Lucca's close proximity to the port of Genoa allowed for the export of Pompeian Olive Oil throughout the world. One of its most important markets was the United States. As the twentieth century began, Pompeian appealed to the burgeoning European community in the United States and also to the many Americans who were just discovering olive oil's taste and culinary versatility.

In 1906 a young entrepreneur named Nathan Musher purchased the Pompeian Olive Oil Company of Lucca, Italy, and continued to produce olive oil in Italy and import it to the United States. Musher also imported bulk olive oil, and built warehouses in Genoa, Tortosa, Barcelona, Málaga and Baltimore. The warehouses were equipped with steel, glass-enameled tanks. The warehouse at Baltimore had a capacity of a-million-and-a-half gallons of olive oil.

The Baltimore warehouse becomes the catalyst for expansion of Pompeian. In the late 1920s, because of turmoil taking place in Europe, the Musher family decided to cease production in Lucca, and move production to the Baltimore location.

In 1930, the company was sold to the Hoffberger family. This American entrepreneurial family had many packaged goods companies and owned the Baltimore Orioles for fifteen years. Under the Hoffbergers’ direction, Pompeian expanded nationally, making it the first national olive oil brand in history.

In the 1940s, Pompeian was promoted nationally. Among those who appeared in early Pompeian ads was actress Katherine de Mille, daughter of the famous movie director, and a wife of Anthony Quinn.

The company was purchased in 1975 by the Moreno family of Spain, who were already dealing in non-foods and foods such as olive oil, wine, and other items from Spain. In 2005, Bill Monroe, who was instrumental in popularizing olive oil in the United States while at Bertolli, was named chief executive officer of Pompeian.

On May 11, 2006, Pompeian marked its 100th anniversary in Baltimore with a commemorative ceremony, luncheon and tour of Pompeian's importing and bottling facility. The company was honored with a citation from the office of Gov. Robert L. Ehrlich Jr. and a “Pompeian Olive Oil Day” proclamation from the office of Mayor Martin O’Malley. To demonstrate its appreciation to Baltimore, Pompeian donated $10,000 to the Baltimore City Public School System. The company also donated $1,000 each to Our Lady of Pompei in Baltimore and The Christian Brothers which went to The Cardinal Gibbons School in Baltimore.

Pompeian was purchased in 2009 by the Devico Family, a prominent Moroccan family and owners of the leading brand in Morocco, Aicha. Under the Aicha brand, the Devico family produces everything from olives, jams, tomato paste, capers, red peppers and more. Additionally, the family owns and operates several other food production, trading, bulk sales and brands, including Overseas Food Trading, LTD., AMD Oil Sales LLC, Sunset Olive Oil and Aicha. The Devico Family has since continued expansion of Pompeian operations in the US.

In 2015, Pompeian partnered with the DCOOP Group of Spain – the largest olive oil coop in the World. DCOOP is the world's largest cooperative of olive growers with 75,000 families of farmers and produces an annual average of 225,000 metric tons of olive oil. The partnership brought together the best possible raw materials and the finest production and bottling facilities in the world, merging assets that include an ultra-modern production facility in Spain directly next to the olive farms. In October 2017, the two groups strengthened the alliance by signing a new agreement that increased the companies' stakes in one another from 20% to 50%. Under this agreement, both groups share a 50% stake in Mercaoleo (which possesses two bottling plants in Antequera, Malaga), a 25% stake in Qorteba Internacional (the refinery and olive oil storage of Alcolea, Córdoba) and a 50% stake in the Pompeian Group. DCOOP also made a significant investment in Pompeian's U.S. operations, which includes oil bottling plants on both the East and West coast and bulk oil trading operations.

Today, Pompeian is part of Pompeian Group, which includes Pompeian, its sister company Sunset Olive Oil, and partnerships with AMD and DCOOP. Under the leadership of David Bensadoun, chief executive officer, Pompeian Group is the largest importer of olive oil in the United States. Mouna Aissaoui, who was honored at the 22nd Maryland International Leadership Awards in March 2018 for her sustained and exemplary efforts in support of Maryland's international relations and trade, oversees Pompeian's operations as Chief Operating Officer for Pompeian, Inc.
