= Target culture =

Overly rigid focus on performance targets within organisations

Target culture is a pejorative term used to refer to the perceived negative effects of rigid adherence to performance targets by businesses and organisations. The term is primarily used to refer to this kind of behaviour within the provision of public services in the United Kingdom. Target culture often stems from not being able to accurately measure a broad social good like health, education or crime prevention; instead, specific targets are used, like increasing the number of people passing an examination or the number of arrests made by a police force.

== Examples ==
School league tables and other education statistics are often criticised as an example of target culture. The use of number of GCSE examinations passed at grade C as a measure of educational attainment has led schools to focus specifically on getting students on the boundary between grades C and D to improve enough to get a C.

In 2007, the Police Federation of England and Wales criticised the bureaucratisation of policing and argued that the use of performance targets increased the number of arrests made for petty offences.

The failure and investigation of Stafford Hospital has been blamed on target culture by some. The Guardian report in an interview with an anonymous senior NHS doctor that Stafford Hospital "was a graphic illustration of the growing disconnect we see every day between a target-driven culture and the best interests of our patients".

In 2008, the British Conservative Party politician Liam Fox, writing for the website ConservativeHome, lists Bristol Eye Centre as an example of the negative effects of a target culture; by trying to meet government targets to recruit more patients, they failed to make follow-up appointments with existing patients leading to some patients losing some or all of their eyesight.

== See also ==
- Management by objectives
