= Impax Environmental Markets =

Investment trust

- Type: Public
- Traded as: LSE: IEM
- Founded: 2002; 24 years ago
- Headquarters: London, United Kingdom
- Key people: Glen Suarez (Chairman)
- Website: www.iemplc.co.uk

Impax Environmental Markets is an investment trust focused on environmental companies in North America, Europe and Asia. It is listed on the London Stock Exchange.

== History ==
The fund was established in January 2002. It was named Best Environmental, Social, and Governance (ESG) Trust by ADVFN for 2020. It was co-managed by Bruce Jenkyn-Jones and Charles French of Impax Asset Management Group until the former retired, leaving French in sole position, in April 2025. The company holds regular continuation votes to confirm that shareholders wish it to continue in its current form, or to wind up.

In June 2026, Saba Capital Management, after being dissatisfied with the company's performance (50% discount to net asset value), forced the resignation of five directors and secured the appointment of five new directors. The resignations included the chairman, Glen Suarez.
