= Impax Asset Management Group =

Specialist asset manager based in London, England

Impax Asset Management Group plc
- Company type: Public Company
- Traded as: LSE: IPX
- Industry: Investment Management
- Founded: London, 1998
- Headquarters: London, England, UK, United Kingdom
- Number of locations: London, New York, Portsmouth, Portland, Hong Kong
- Key people: Sally Bridgeland (chair); Ian Simm (Chief Executive); Charlie Ridge (CFO)
- AUM: £37.2 billion (as at 30 September 2024)
- Website: www.impaxam.com

Impax Asset Management Group plc is a specialist asset manager based in London, England.

== History ==
The business was founded in 1998 to invest in companies whose work might reduce resource scarcity, with support from the International Finance Corporation. Various commentators have referred to the company's focus on environmental matters.

On 18 September 2017, the group plc announced that it had entered into agreements to acquire 100% of Pax World Management LLC. The acquisition was completed on 18 January 2018. In December 2018, the company announced that it would be opening an operation in Dublin to serve clients after Brexit (the withdrawal of the United Kingdom from the European Union).

After 23.7% of shareholders voted against the re-appointment of EY as the company's auditor in May 2018, the company was criticised by the Investment Association, over an apparent lack of independence of EY as its auditor, in December 2018.

== Investments ==
The company manages environmentally focused equity investments such as renewable energy, water and waste management through various funds including Impax Environmental Markets, which is focused on environmental companies in North America, Europe and Asia was launched in 2002. Impax New Energy Investors is a €125 million fund which closed in August 2006 and Impax New Energy Investors II is a €330 million fund which closed in August 2011. It also manages listed equity funds on behalf of third parties including BNP Paribas.

The company had assets under management of £20.2 billion at 30 September 2020. However, it remains exposed to the risks that have adversely affected developers in the solar and wind industries. According to the New York Times research by Impax Asset Management Group has found that only one third of investors are sufficiently concerned about climate change to invest in clean energy implying that those investors are clearly failing to realise the risks of not doing so. The company has therefore been lobbying the U.S. Securities and Exchange Commission to force companies to disclose the location of their assets so their exposure to environmental risks can be properly evaluated.

The company has made some unusual investments: businesses supported by the company have included Royal DSM, a Dutch chemical company which had invented a food additive which reduces the methane released by cows burping.

== Significant shareholders ==
One of the largest institutional shareholders in the company, BNP Paribas, who had held a 28% stake in the business, sold more than 40% of its shareholding in November 2020.
