= European Climate Foundation =

Philanthropic initiative

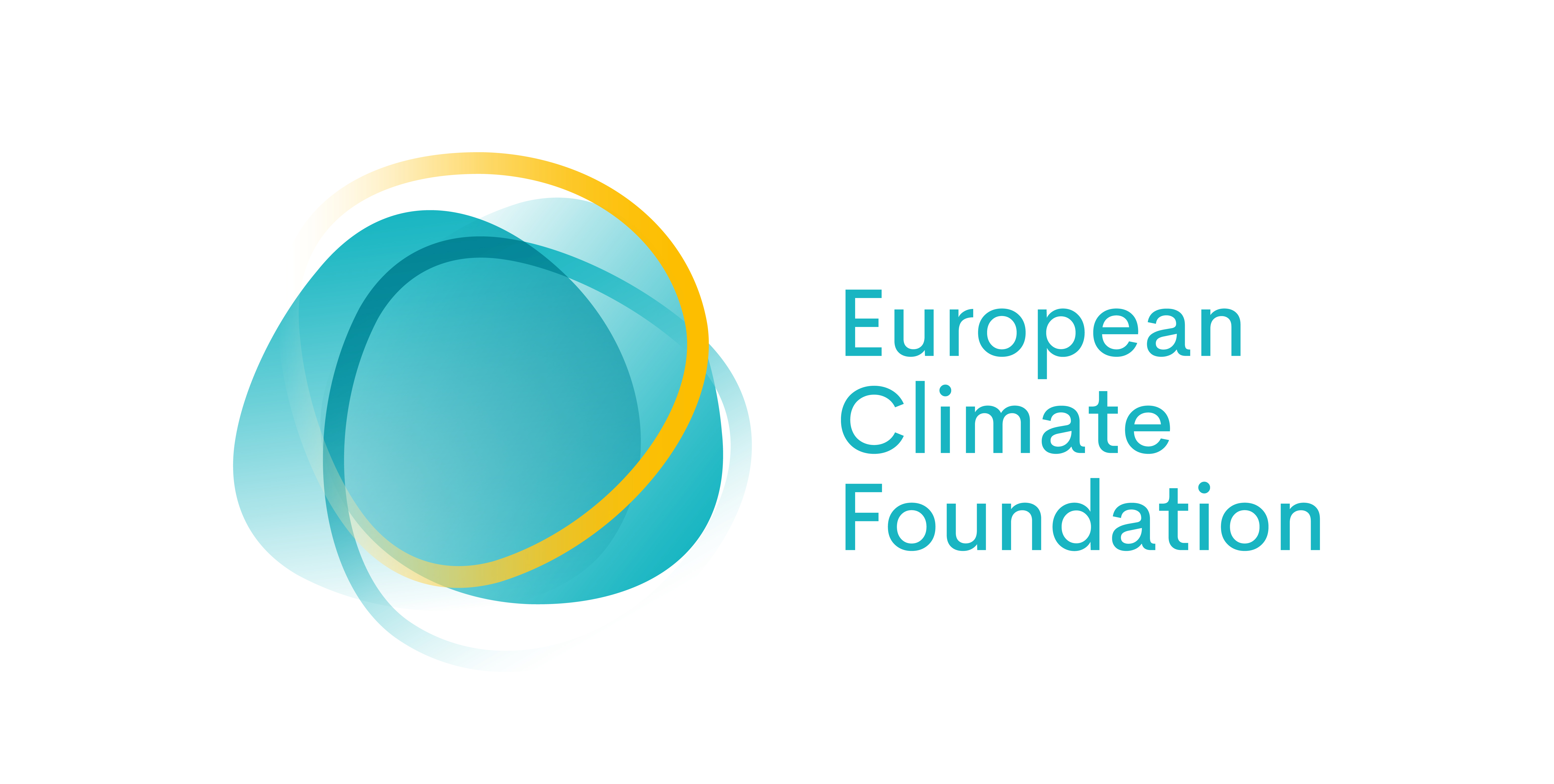
- Formation: 2008
- Type: Philanthropic initiative
- Headquarters: The Hague (Netherlands)
- Website: europeanclimate.org

The European Climate Foundation (ECF) is a non-profit charitable foundation, registered in the Netherlands. It independent philanthropic initiative working to help tackle the climate crisis by fostering the development of a net zero emissions society at the national, European and global level. Its aim is to promote climate and energy related policies that press Europe and other key global players to achieve a net zero greenhouse gas emissions society by 2050.

As a foundation, the ECF’s main operations are guided by grant making activities, which are strategically distributed among, and implemented by a wide range of organisations engaged in many different types of charitable activities to mitigate climate change. These range from research work to advocacy or public campaigning.

The ECF does accept donations by various types of foundations, but does not accept Commercial Entities and associated programs as donors. ECF work is also financed by governments, receiving some 660,000 Euro from the German government in 2025 alone, according to LobbyControl.

However, the ECF does not provide information on the amount of money its funders contribute, which constitutes a lack of transparency.

== Fields of work ==
As both a convenor and a member of a network, the ECF works with grantee partners active in most European countries to support European climate action. The Foundation assists partner organisations in carrying out activities that support policies aligned with the Paris Agreement objectives and the public debate on climate action, with the goal of supporting a transition to a net zero economy and sustainable society in Europe and other regions.

== Structure ==
In terms of personnel and structure, the work of the ECF is divided into three main areas:

- Sector Programmes (Land Use, Transport, Buildings, Industry & Innovation, Energy Systems & Coal, Finance, and Climate Planning & Laws)
- Cross-cutting platforms and initiatives including work on the European Green Deal
- Country-specific initiatives promoting climate action in France, Germany, Poland, Spain, Italy, Hungary, Czech Republic, the UK and Turkey as well as regionally-led initiatives in Central Europe and South-East Europe.

The ECF’s headquarters are based in The Hague (Netherlands).

The Foundation employs over 200 people and, since 2017, it has been led by CEO Laurence Tubiana, succeeding Dr Johannes Meier who led the Foundation for six years.

The work of the Foundation is controlled by a supervisory board, charged with governing and overseeing the ECF’s activities as well as defining the organisation's strategic direction.

The European Climate Foundation has supported the establishment of several platforms such as CarbonBrief at the end of 2010, the 2050 Pathways Platform in 2016, the Net-Zero 2050, and many more.
