= Piers Forster =

British climate scientist and professor

Piers Forster CBE FRMetS FRS
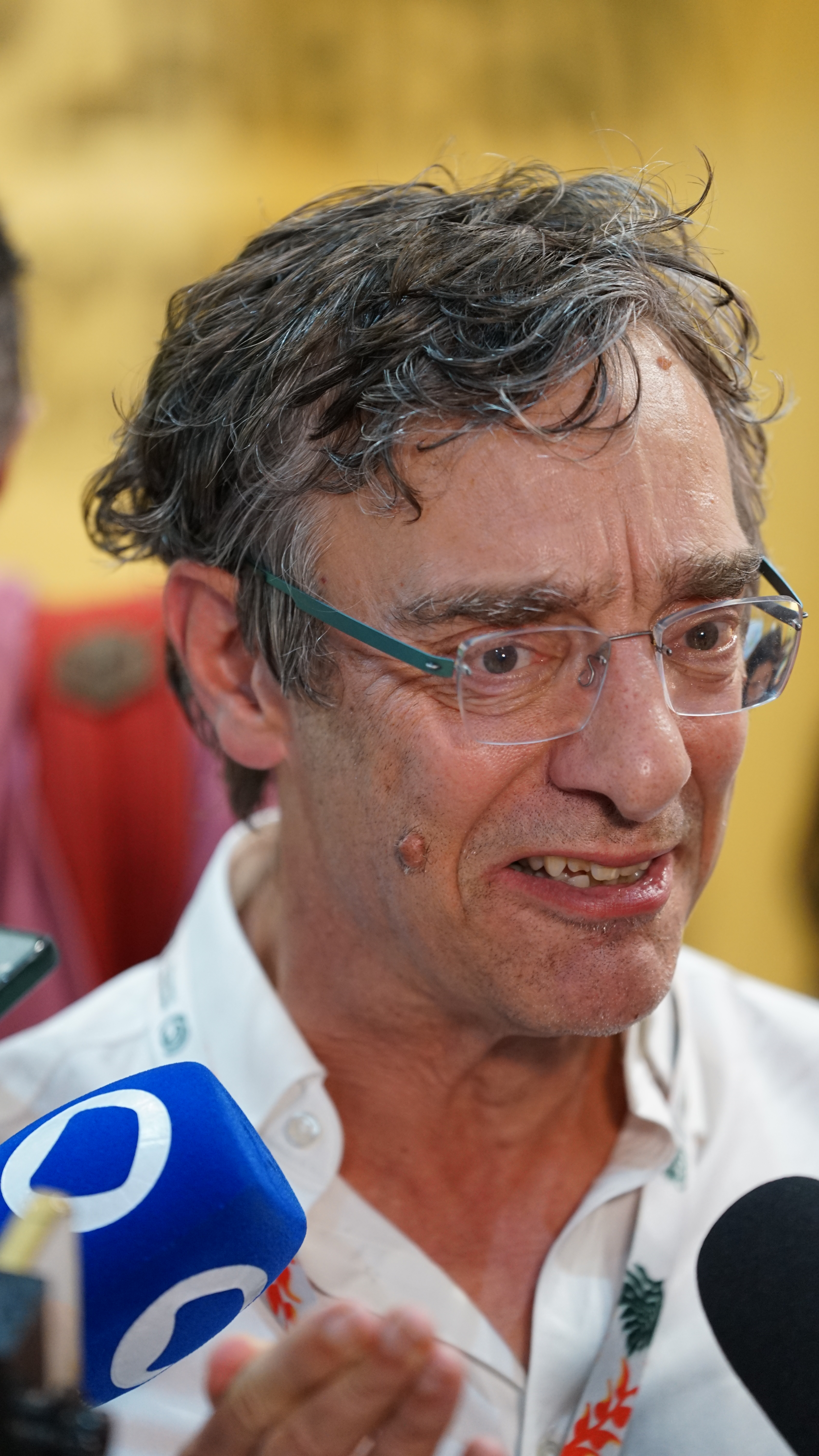
- Forster at COP30 in 2025
- Education: Imperial College (BSc, 1990); University of Reading (Ph.D, 1994)
- Awards: American Geophysical Union Fellow (2019)
- Scientific career
- Institutions: University of Leeds
- Thesis: Measuring and modelling UV radiation (1994)
- Doctoral advisor: Keith Shine

Piers Maxwell de Ferranti Forster is a British climate scientist who is a Professor of Physical Climate Change and Director of the Priestley Centre for Climate Futures at the University of Leeds. A physicist by training, his research focuses on quantifying the different human causes of climate change and the way the Earth responds. He is best known for his work on radiative forcing, climate sensitivity, aviation-climate effects, climate engineering, climate modelling and carbon budgets. He has contributed heavily to the writing of Intergovernmental Panel on Climate Change (IPCC) reports, including acting as a Lead Author for the Fourth and Fifth Assessment Reports, and a Co-ordinating Lead Author for the Sixth Report. He also acted as a Lead Author of the IPCC 2018 Special Report on Global Warming of 1.5 °C. He leads an international effort to annually update climate indictors, the Indicators of Global Climate Change project. Forster was elected a Fellow of the Royal Society in May 2026.

== Career ==
Forster was educated at Imperial College London, where he gained a BSc in physics in 1990. He was subsequently awarded a PhD in meteorology by the University of Reading in 1994. After research posts at the Universities of Reading, Colorado and Melbourne he was appointed a Reader at the University of Leeds in 2005. He has been Professor of Physical Climate Change at Leeds since 2008.

Forster led the EU Horizon CONSTRAIN project and was principal investigator of the Integrated Assessment of Geoengineering Proposals project. He has doubts as to whether geoengineering could be deployed effectively. Forster is also trustee of a UK rainforest-protection charity United Bank of Carbon. He has a number of UK government and industry roles including being a member of the UK Climate Change Committee. From 2023 until 2025, he was interim Chair of the Committee, succeeding Lord Deben.

Forster was appointed a Commander of the Order of the British Empire (CBE) in the 2026 New Year Honours for services to Tackling Climate Change.

== Awards ==
- 2011 Royal Society Wolfson Merit Award
- 2019 American Geophysical Union Fellow
- 2023 Natural Environment Research Council Societal Impact Award Winner
- 2019, 2020, 2021,2022, 2023, 2024 Clarivate Web of Science, Highly Cited Researcher
- 2024 Royal Meteorological Society, Climate Science and Climate Science Communication Award
- 2026 Commander of the Order of the British Empire
- 2026 Fellow of the Royal Society
