= Bernard David =

American entrepreneur, educator and author

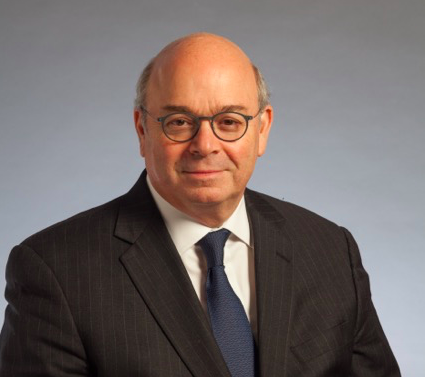
- Bernard David (2019)
- Education: University of Pennsylvania
- Occupations: Entrepreneur, Educator, Author
- Known for: Focus on implementing systems solutions to sustainability
- Spouse: Lisa Day David
- Children: 1 daughter, 1 son

Bernard J. David is an entrepreneur, educator, and author.

David has founded or co-founded, built and sold several businesses. They include SaveSmart, Inc. (Prio, Inc.)--sold to Infospace, Inc. and officesupplies.com—sold to Office Depot.

== Sustainability ==
Since 2001, David has turned his attention to the area of sustainability. He has adopted the view that 'sustainability consists of fulfilling the needs of current generations without compromising the needs of future generations, while ensuring a balance between economic growth, environmental care and social well-being.'

He believes that a systems approach to sustainability is critical—one that is based on science, and harnesses market forces to drive and fuel progress to solve large scale climate issues.

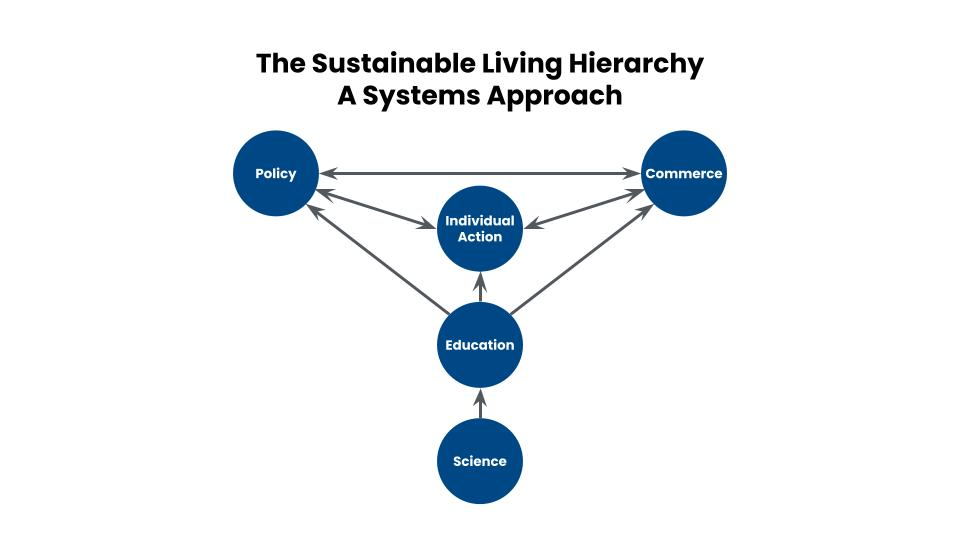

To that end, he is the founder of the Global CO_{2} Initiative, a market-based approach aimed at addressing excessive carbon dioxide emissions in the atmosphere and oceans. The initiative seeks to develop economically viable solutions by investing in technologies that capture CO₂ and convert it into commercial products, thereby providing long-term climatological benefits.

Mr. David was also a commissioner on the Energy Transitions Commission, a diverse group of global leaders from corporate, governmental, academic and non-profit backgrounds who believe the evolution of energy systems is not a single change, but is made up of many different, but inter-connected energy transitions. The group aims to inform what it will take to create credible, accelerating transitions towards universal, clean energy systems across the world.

Using informed commerce (market-based solutions), Bernard helped to create Captura. Captura designed a solution that removes CO_{2} from the ocean and harnesses its ability to heal the climate—a process known as Direct Ocean Capture (DOC).

After David's life-altering heart attack, he discovered the power of plant-based foods to solve health and climate issues. He realized the need to feed 10 billion people on planet Earth by 2050 with nutritious and sustainable food, taking climate impact into account. David therefore founded and served as chairman of the Board of The ISH Company. The ISH Company is on a mission to create innovative, sustainable, and healthy (ISH) food that transforms the way we eat; it was sold in early 2025.

From a science perspective, David is a member emeritus of the Director's Council of the Scripps Institution of Oceanography whose mission is to seek, teach, and communicate scientific understanding of the oceans, atmosphere, Earth, and other planets for the benefit of society and the environment. He also sits on the Strategic Advisory Board of the Joint Center for Artificial Photosynthesis JCAP, the nation's largest research program dedicated to the development of artificial solar fuels generation science and technology.

David has served on the boards of NEON, Inc (The National Ecological Observatory Network) funded by the United States National Science Foundation and the Stroud Water Research Center.

He was a member of the advisory committee of the AAAS-Lemelson Invention Ambassadors Program], a program designed to highlight the importance of invention to economic development, innovation and quality of life, globally.

To educate future generations, David founded erthnxt, inc., which became a part of the National Wildlife Federation. Its flagship program "Trees for Wildlife" focuses on educating youth on the merits of gaining a long-term perspective through service-based learning. The program has now been spun off into a for-profit company called Garden for Wildlife].

David is a member of the External Advisory Board of the Graham Sustainability Institute at the University of Michigan and was a senior fellow at The Wharton School Initiative on Global Environmental Leadership (IGEL).

From a policy standpoint, David served as a trustee of The H. John Heinz III Center for Science, Economics and the Environment. He has also been an advisor to the United States Environmental Protection Agency.

In 2007, David gave a speech to the Pacific Pension Institute's Annual Conference entitled, "Climate Change and Its Influence on Investing: A New Perspective," which outlined investment opportunities brought on by a changing climate. Its approach has been used by David when making investments or serving on the boards of sustainable businesses. As such, David serves as a member of the board of directors of CMC Energy Services, Inc] He has also served on the boards of Solidia Technologies, Inc. and Tangent Energy Solutions. David was a venture partner and advisor to EnerTech Capital.

David has taught at the Wharton School, University of Pennsylvania as a lecturer in entrepreneurship to undergraduates, graduates and executives.

Bernard has written eight books on various elements of entrepreneurship and allied computer technology use. He also authors the substack, "Daily Dose of Hope," an apolitical, hopeful message that engages a global community.

== Education ==
David earned a Bachelor of Arts in political science from the University of Pennsylvania, a Bachelor of Science in Finance and an MBA in marketing from The Wharton School of the University of Pennsylvania].

== Personal life ==
Bernard is married to Lisa Day David, an artist. They have two grown children, Sam and Emily.
