= Climate and Nature Bill =

- Bill
- Parliament of the United Kingdom
- Long title: A Bill to require the Secretary of State to achieve climate and nature targets for the United Kingdom; to give the Secretary of State a duty to implement a strategy to achieve those targets; to establish a Climate and Nature Assembly to advise the Secretary of State in creating that strategy; to give duties to the Committee on Climate Change and the Joint Nature Conservation Committee regarding the strategy and targets; and for connected purposes.
- Citation: Bill 14 2024–25
- Introduced by: Roz Savage
- Territorial extent: England, Wales, Scotland, and Northern Ireland

Status: Pending

History of passage through Parliament

Records of Parliamentary debate relating to the statute from Hansard

The Climate and Nature Bill, formerly the Climate and Ecology Bill, is a private member's bill before the Parliament of the United Kingdom aimed at tackling the climate and ecological emergencies through an integrated approach. Similar iterations of the current bill have come before Parliament multiple times previously.

The bill was most recently introduced in the House of Commons by Roz Savage (Lib Dem) on 16 October 2024 who said that the proposed legislation "has the ability to make the UK a world leader in tackling the climate-nature crisis, delivering a comprehensive, joined up plan that is finally aligned with what the science says is necessary. It can pave the way for a truly just transition and ensure that citizens have a real say in deciding a fair way forward".

If enacted, the bill would ensure that the UK Government:

- reduces greenhouse gas emissions in line with its international commitments under the Paris Agreement
- halts and reverses the destruction of the natural world, in line with the Global Biodiversity Framework
- establishes a temporary Climate and Nature Assembly to recommend measures for inclusion in an all-of-government strategy.

== Objectives ==
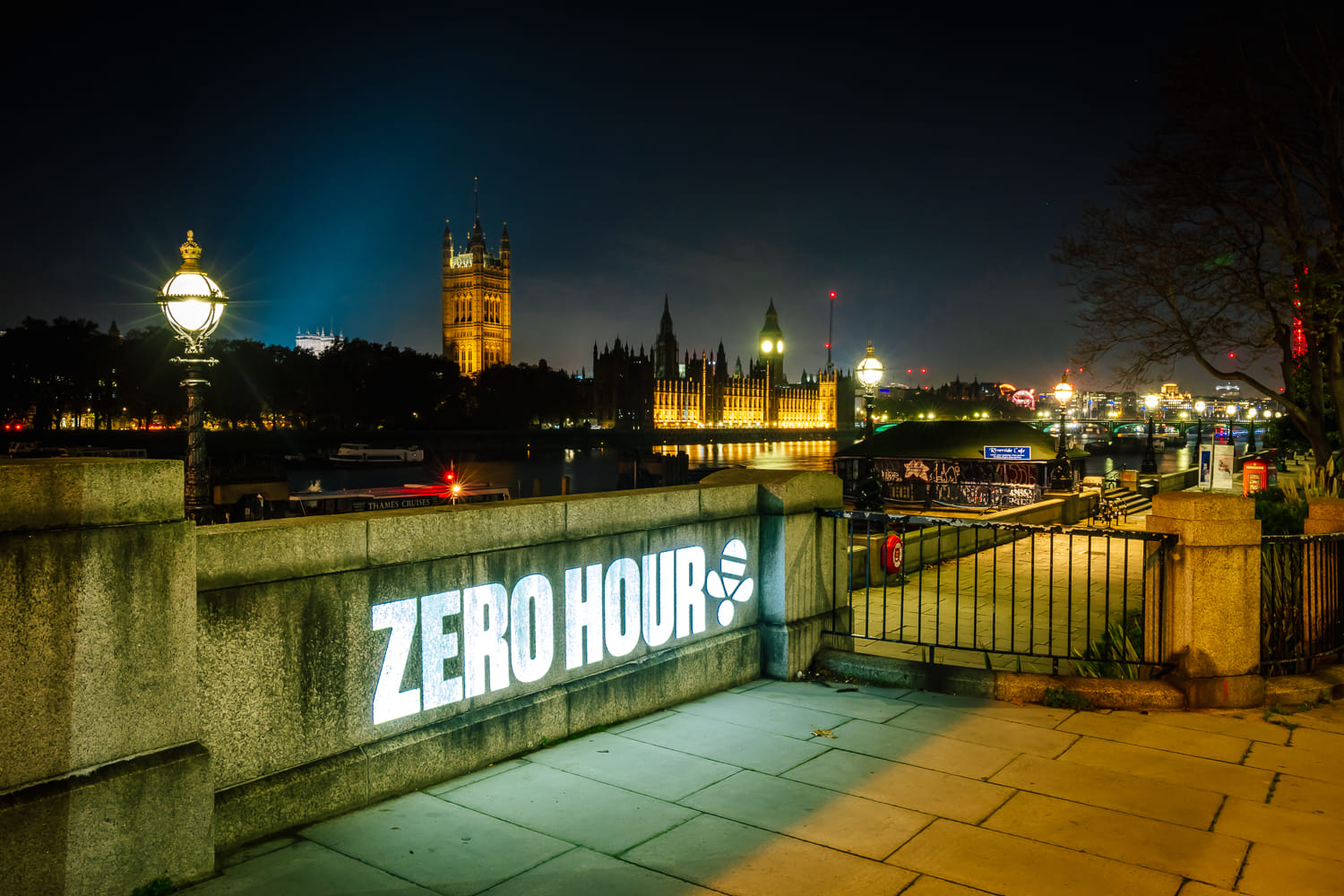
Zero Hour, the cross-party campaign for the CAN Bill.

A Climate and Nature Act would require the Secretary of State to achieve climate and nature targets for the UK, and implement a strategy to achieve those targets. It would establish a climate and nature assembly to advise in the creation that strategy, and give duties to the Climate Change Committee and the Joint Nature Conservation Committee regarding the strategy and targets.

The House of Commons Library has produced briefing note which explores the bill's aim—to ensure that policy and action on the climate and nature crises is science-led and people-oriented—and outlines its proposed duties on the Government and advisory and monitoring bodies to achieve its targets through the delivery of a integrated strategy.

The Zero Hour campaign, which promotes the bill, has also produced a briefing note, outlining its objectives as:

- creating a joined up strategy, as the climate and nature crises are intertwined, and tackling them requires a plan that considers both together
- cutting greenhouse gas emissions in line with the UK's Paris Agreement-aligned Nationally Determined Contributions—expanded to include international aviation and shipping—and by ending fossil fuel production and imports as rapidly as possible
- halting and reversing nature's decline across the UK by 2030—in line with the mission of the Global Biodiversity Framework—and prioritising nature in decision-making
- taking responsibility for Britain's overseas emissions and ecological footprints
- ensuring no-one and no community is left behind in a nature-positive just transition—by giving citizens a say in finding a fair way forward—via a climate and nature assembly.

== Legislative history ==
Over the 2019–24 Parliament, the bill was presented twice by (the then Green MP) Caroline Lucas. In the 2019–2021 session, the first reading of the bill (Bill 172) took place on 2 September 2020, and it did not progress further.

In the 2021–22 session, the first reading of the bill (Bill 61) took place on 21 June 2021. Its second reading was postponed and rescheduled for 6 May 2022, and it did not progress further.

In the 2022–23 session, the bill (HL Bill 13) was introduced in the House of Lords by Lord Redesdale (then, Lib Dem) via the private members' bill ballot route. Its first reading was on 21 May 2022, second reading was on 15 July 2022, committee stage was on 18 November 2022, report stage was on 25 January 2023, and third reading was on 21 April 2023. After passing the Lords, Wera Hobhouse (Lib Dem) 'carried over' the bill to the Commons, and it did not progress further.

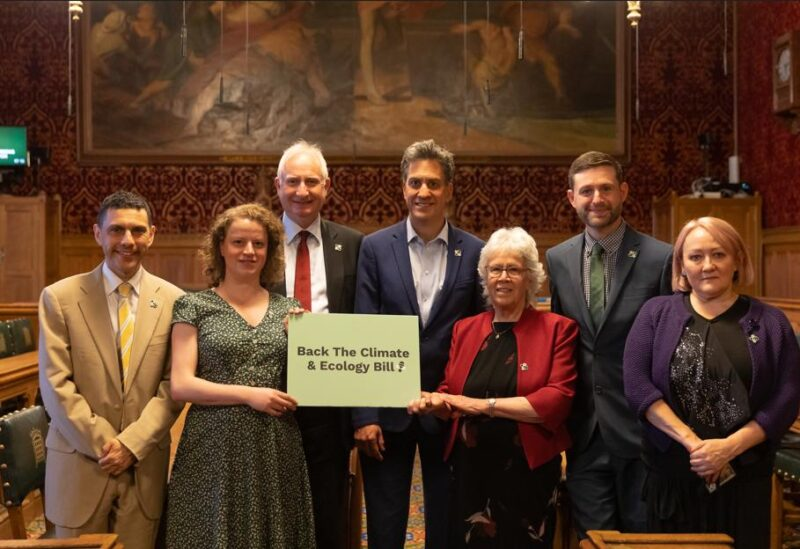
Members of the (then) Shadow ESNZ and EFRA Teams supporting Olivia Blake's introduction of the Bill: (L-R) Alex Sobel, Olivia Blake, Daniel Zeichner, Ed Miliband, Baroness Blake, Jim McMahon and Kerry McCarthy.

In the same 2022-23 session, the bill (Bill 304) was introduced in the Commons by Olivia Blake (Labour) via a ten-minute rule motion on 10 May 2023, when the Labour Party offered their support for its "ambition and objectives".

In the 2023–24 session, the bill (Bill 192) was presented by Alex Sobel (Labour/Co-op) on 21 March 2024. Its second reading was scheduled for 17 May 2024, and it did not progress further.

The Conservative Government did not offer its support for the bill over 2019–2024.

In the current session of the 2024-29 Parliament, Roz Savage (Lib Dem) introduced the bill (Bill 14) on 16 October 2024 having been drawn third in the private members' bill ballot. Unlike earlier attempts to advance the proposed legislation, Savage was given priority time on a sitting Friday. Its second reading took place on 24 January 2025—and after a division in the Commons—the bill was adjourned until 11 July 2025, when it was again rescheduled for 29 May 2026.

The Labour Government has not offered its support for the bill. On 24 January, the Minister for Nature, Mary Creagh, assured supporting MPs—though the Government would not allow the bill to progress—that next steps would include "binding commitments" to advance the bill's objectives.

Following the adjournment, the Secretary of State for Energy Security and Net Zero, Ed Miliband, issued via a video on the social media channel, X, promising to set to work on the "spirit and substance" of the bill—"including for legislation"—in order to "make a meaningful difference" for climate and nature. He updated MPs on progress in the first annual State of Climate and Nature statement on 14 July.

It is not clear if the bill will return in the next (as yet unscheduled) second session of the 2024–2029 Parliament. A motion tabled by 104 MPs in May 2025—including Daisy Cooper (Lib Dem), Carla Denyer (Green), Liz Saville Roberts (Plaid Cymru) and Claire Hanna (SDLP)—is urging the Government to allocate parliamentary time for further debate to ensure the bill's "critical" climate and nature targets are legally addressed.

=== 2019–2024 Parliament ===
==== 2019–2021 session ====
===== Bill 172 =====
In the 2019–2021 session, Caroline Lucas presented the bill on 2 September 2020. It received its first reading the same day. Its scheduled second reading of 12 March 2021 did not take place. 11 MPs co-sponsored the bill: Alan Brown (SNP), Claire Hanna (SDLP), Wera Hobhouse (Lib Dem), Clive Lewis (Labour), Liz Saville Roberts (Plaid Cymru), Stephen Farry (Alliance), Ben Lake (Plaid Cymru), Tommy Sheppard (SNP), Alex Sobel (Labour/Co-op), Zarah Sultana (Labour) and Nadia Whittome (Labour).

Lucas also tabled a corresponding, cross-party early day motion—EDM 832—about the bill on 2 September 2020. It was supported by 92 MPs (including Jim Shannon, DUP) and called on the Conservative Government to support the bill, noting its enactment would:

Ensure that the UK plays its fair and proper role in limiting global temperatures to 1.5°C by taking account of the UK's entire carbon footprint, including consumption emissions released overseas as a result of goods manufactured abroad for use in the UK, [and] that it would [also] actively improve the natural world by protecting and restoring the UK's ecosystems, and end the damage to nature caused by supply chains.

Lucas led a debate on the UK's response to the climate and ecological emergency on 9 February 2021. She called for immediate and ambitious action, two years on from Parliament's declaration of an environment and climate emergency on 1 May 2019. In it, she highlighted that escalating global crises—record heat, wildfires, melting ice caps, and "one million species facing extinction"—emphasised the need for UK leadership ahead of COP26 and COP15. She said that:

The scale and ramifications of the emergency require us to set aside party differences, and reach for the new vision of human prosperity that we know is possible. With sufficient political will, we can co-operate to ensure we all thrive within the limits of our planet—but that is not going to happen without new legislation that gives us a framework commensurate with the science and with reality. The [bill] is that new legislation. It brings the future into the present—and our responsibility to the future into the present, too. [All MPs should] recognise that the climate-nature crisis is bigger than any one political ideology, [and work together] on legislation that could be a new and desperately needed global first.

Lucas also criticised the UK's "inconsistent" domestic climate policies—arguing that the Climate Change Act is "out of date" as scientists had warned about rising emissions in light of the shrinking global carbon budget. She stressed nature's "absence" from climate strategies, despite the UK's "severe" biodiversity loss—and called for citizen engagement via assemblies, as seen in the work of Climate Assembly UK. Lucas also advocated updating UK legislation to reflect science, equity, and public involvement for a just transition, warning of "systemic collapse" without it. Supporting MPs echoed her urgency, while the then Conservative Minister—Anne-Marie Trevelyan—defended the UK's net zero progress and Ten Point Plan, promising "global leadership".

Other MPs pressed the Conservative Government to support the bill, including David Linden (SNP) and Rachael Maskell (Labour). Energy Ministers' responses asserted that the Government was aiming for net zero greenhouse gas emissions by 2050, as set in 2019, and that as the "first major economy to legislate in this way"—as the then Energy Minister, Kwasi Kwarteng, said on 8 October 2021—the UK was a "global leader".

===== Environment Bill: proposed amendments =====
In the 2019–2021 session, supportive MPs also focussed on securing amendments to the Conservative Government's Environment Bill in order to reflect proposals in the bill. In a cross-party initiative led by Lloyd Russell-Moyle and Daniel Zeichner (then) of Labour's Shadow EFRA Team, two amendments proposed at committee stage on 26 November 2020, but were not successful.

The first, new clause 28, set out new statutory environmental objectives and commitments for the Secretary of State and for the new Office for Environmental Protection (which was established under provisions in the Environment Act). New clause 29 would have required the Secretary of State to report to Parliament on the adequacy of environmental legislation and policy for meeting the climate and ecology challenges faced by the UK and the world. Zeichner said that:

We have taken a number of these ideas from the [bill], which [Labour] believes is right to place emphasis on the importance of expanding and enhancing natural ecosystems and agroecosystems to safeguard their capacity as carbon sinks, as well as on the need to restore biodiverse habits and their soils. Out there, in the world, there is an appetite for this more ambitious approach.

A further amendment was tabled at report stage, new clause 9, which was the same as new clause 28 during committee. It was debated on 26 January 2021 and referred to by several MPs, including Lucas, Ben Lake (Plaid Cymru) and Debbie Abrahams (Labour)—but was not pushed to a division.

Taking inspiration from the bill, Lord Teverson (Lib Dem) proposed defining the purpose of the Environment Bill as addressing "the biodiversity and climate emergency" and requiring "the Prime Minister [to] declare that there is a biodiversity and climate emergency, domestically and globally".

The clause was added to the Environment Bill by Peers during its passage through the Lords, and during 'ping pong' between the Houses (the then Climate Change Committee chair) Lord Deben said that refusing to accept it would "send the wrong signal", at a time when "we should be united in sending the right signals, so that in all discussions people will know precisely where Britain stands". Though Peers insisted on the clause, it was ultimately removed by MPs, and the then Minister for Nature, Rebecca Pow, said that:

Actions are what are necessary to combat the climate and biodiversity emergency—not legal declarations".

==== 2021–2022 session: Bill 61 ====
In the 2021–2022 session, Caroline Lucas tabled an amendment to the 2021 Queen's Speech of 12 May 2021, regretting insufficient measures in that speech to address the climate and ecological emergency. It attracted support of 42 Labour, SNP, Lib Dem, SDLP and Plaid Cymru MPs, and urged the Conservative Government to make time for the bill to be debated and passed into law.

Lucas presented the bill for a second time in the Commons on 21 June 2021 with 11 co-sponsors: Alan Brown (SNP), Ed Davey (Lib Dem), Stephen Farry (Alliance), Barry Gardiner (Labour), Claire Hanna (SDLP), Ben Lake (Plaid Cymru), Clive Lewis (Labour), Brendan O'Hara (SNP), Sarah Olney (Lib Dem), Liz Saville Roberts (Plaid Cymru) and Alex Sobel (Labour/Co-op).

The bill was scheduled for a second reading debate on four occasions—10 September 2021, 29 October 2021, 10 December 2021 and 6 May 2022. It was not allocated time to proceed.

Supportive Parliamentarians urged the Conservative Government to support the bill during other debates and questions, including Lucas, Saville-Roberts, Hanna, Farry, Beth Winter (Labour), Lord Oates (Lib Dem), Mary Kelly Foy (Labour), Lloyd Russell-Moyle (Labour), Baroness Bennett (Green) and Nadia Whittome (Labour).

The Government did offer its support, or make time for the bill—which was regretted by MPs, including Farry—who said:

Despite the rhetorical commitment to the delivery of net zero by 2050, the Government do not have the policies and programmes in place to achieve that. As a co-signatory of the [bill], I am deeply disappointed that the Government have chosen not to advance such legislation. A bill that establishes a statutory framework for the bold, joined-up change that is necessary to fulfil the UK's international climate responsibilities—and to facilitate transition to a zero-carbon economy—is greatly needed.

==== 2022–2023 session ====
===== HL Bill 13 =====
In the 2022–2023 session, the bill was introduced in the House of Lords by Lord Redesdale (then, Lib Dem), who was drawn 8 of 25 in the private members' bill ballot. Its first reading took place on 25 May 2022 and its second reading was on 15 July 2022.

At its second reading, Peers from across the House spoke in favour, including Baroness Hooper (Conservative), Baroness Boycott and Lord Green (Crossbenchers), the Lord Bishop of St Albans, Baroness Bennett (Green) and Lord Teverson (Lib Dem). Reflecting cross-party support for stronger action, Peers stressed the "interconnected climate and ecological crises"—though some raised concerns about methane targets and food security.

The Conservative Government, via Baroness Bloomfield, resisted the bill, citing the UK's existing frameworks like the Climate Change Act and Environment Act. During the debate, Labour's Frontbench spokesperson, Baroness Blake, said:

Given the [Conservative] Government's stated ambition ahead of the COP15 biodiversity summit to halt and reverse biodiversity loss by 2030—a target reflected in this bill—what plans does the Government have, before the Montreal summit, to align domestic policy with international ambition? Surely the Government can do better than simply halting nature's decline? Could the Minister explain why it is seemingly good enough to call on other nations to restore nature while, at home, we are satisfied with managing its decline?

At committee stage on 18 November 2022, Redesdale amended the bill to focus on its nature objectives in light of the Global Biodiversity Framework to be agreed at COP15—for the Parties, including the UK—to halt and reverse nature loss by 2030. The revised Ecology Bill proposed a duty on the Secretary of State to reverse the UK's contribution to nature degradation by 2030—boosting species, habitats and ecosystem health against a 2020 baseline—in order to align with Britain's UN biodiversity commitments.

Proposing his amendments, Redesdale emphasised the UK's dire nature depletion—i.e. that 40% of species have declined since 1970, and that 600 million birds have been 'lost' in Europe over 40 years—calling for more ambitious nature recovery action. Lord Randall (Conservative) said that debates about conservation policy are often "talking about stopping the loss, but we should be increasing our biodiversity at the same time".

Lord Green (Crossbench) reminded Peers that, in the UK, "just over half our natural biodiversity is still intact, placing us last in the G7—and in the bottom 10% worldwide—because so much of our land has been given over to marginal agriculture or monoculture conifer plantations". Labour's spokesperson, Baroness Blake, said on behalf of HM Opposition that:

The Labour Party [had] committed to putting the environment and climate at the heart of its agenda and delivering nature-positive action—which halts and reverses the loss of biodiversity by 2030—for the benefit of all people on the planet, as is the ask of [the bill]. That element of reversing will make the real difference between the [Conservative] Government's position and what is necessary. The Environment Act commits to halt species decline, but fails to reverse decline and does not tackle broader biodiversity loss.

The Conservative Minister, Lord Callanan, acknowledged that nature is in decline around the world, but resisted the proposed reforms, citing the Environment Act's species abundance target as "a good proxy for the health of the wider ecosystem".

The Ecology Bill passed through its remaining Lords stages successfully, and was 'handed over' to Wera Hobhouse (Lib Dem) in the Commons for its first reading on 24 April 2023. It was not given time to progress further, but campaigners welcomed that the Labour Party had offered its support for the bill as it passed through the Upper House.

===== Bill 304 =====
In the same session, Olivia Blake (Labour) introduced the bill in the Commons on 10 May 2023. As a ten-minute rule bill, and unlike earlier presentations, Blake delivered a speech at its first (and last) reading. No MP spoke for a further ten minutes to oppose the bill, and it was not objected to. A second reading date of 24 November 2023 was set. The bill did not make progress.

Backed by MPs from all main parties, its co-sponsors were Derek Thomas (Conservative), Peter Bottomley (Conservative), Alan Brown (SNP), Brendan O'Hara (SNP), Ed Davey (Lib Dem), Wera Hobhouse (Lib Dem), Liz Saville Roberts (Plaid Cymru), Colum Eastwood (SDLP), Caroline Lucas (Green), Stephen Farry (Alliance) and Geraint Davies (Independent).

In her speech, Blake argued that the intertwined climate and nature crises demanded urgent, integrated action—and that the Conservative policies "fell short". She argued that aligning with science and international commitments—like the 1.5°C target and COP15 obligations—is "critical" for survival. She highlighted immediate impacts in the Global South and increasingly in the UK, and said:

As the Member for Newport West [Ruth Jones] said so well during a debate on the [bill's] principles last November: "We know that climate action must be nature-positive action and that we must halt and reverse the loss of biodiversity by 2030 for the benefit of all people and the planet". This bill brings that vital issue to the fore. I am delighted that so many members of local councils, including [now, former bill supporter] Georgia Gould, and local mayors, including the Mayor of London, have recognised that and are backing the bill. It is time that we got the action we need from the [Conservative] Government to ensure that we can survive.

Blake also set out nature's role as a climate mitigator, with deteriorating carbon sinks—like peatlands and woodlands—signalling a need for equal focus on emissions cuts and habitat restoration. She warned that $44 trillion in global output—and 300 million people—are at risk from nature's decline, alongside health threats from pollinator loss. Blake also criticised the "absence" of a concrete plan to reverse biodiversity loss by 2030, risking "irreversible" ecological tipping points, and advocated for meaningful public involvement via citizens' assemblies, saying:

The double-headed climate and nature crisis is affecting people's lives now, especially in the Global South, but increasingly in the UK. Just think of the climate change-triggered heatwaves in India and Pakistan, the floods we have seen worldwide and, of course, the floods and heatwaves of recent years in the UK. There is no room for complacency, and no time to waste.

When Blake introduced the bill, Labour's Frontbench ESNZ and EFRA Teams—including (the then Shadow Secretaries of State) Ed Miliband and Jim McMahon—announced the Labour Party's support for the "ambition and objectives" for her bill. Blake commented that this was an "important step on the way to getting a full commitment from the Labour Party to take up [the bill] so that it becomes official Labour policy". At the 2023 Labour conference, Blake chaired a Zero Hour fringe event on 8 October with (then Shadow Ministers) Ruth Jones and Kerry McCarthy. Jones confirmed Labour's commitment to ensure that nature's destruction is not only halted, but "firmly in reverse by 2030". Labour's ambition to "align" their energy policies to the UK's 1.5°C obligations under the Paris Agreement was also confirmed by McCarthy at the event.

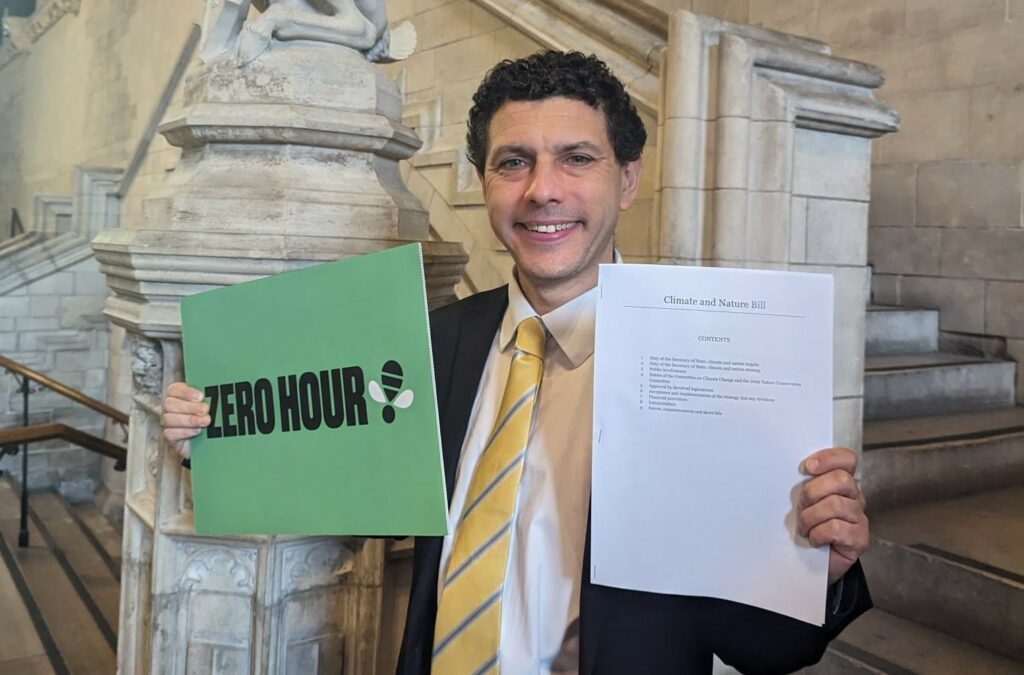
Alex Sobel MP

==== 2023–2024 session: Bill 192 ====
In the 2023–2024 session, Alex Sobel (Labour/Co-op) tabled an amendment to Charles III's first King's Speech, regretting the lack of the bill. The amendment was supported by 42 MPs from across the Green, Lib Dem, Plaid Cymru, SDLP, Alliance and Labour parties—including George Howarth (Labour).

In the same session, Sobel presented the bill on 21 March 2024. Its co-sponsors were Caroline Lucas (Green), Ed Davey (Lib Dem), Colum Eastwood (SDLP) Brendan O'Hara (SNP), Olivia Blake (Labour), Peter Bottomley (Conservative), Daisy Cooper (Lib Dem), Clive Lewis (Labour), Stephen Farry (Alliance), Alison Thewliss (SNP) and Derek Thomas (Conservative). Writing in the Big Issue, Sobel said:

It's clear that we urgently need a new plan. One that brings people from different walks of life together—one that locks our international commitments in law—and one that involves citizens in the just transition we need to put us on the path to a zero-carbon, nature-rich future. A future of affordable, clean, home-grown energy and greater food security. A future of flourishing wildlife. A future of cleaner air, green jobs and more prosperous communities. I'm proud to sponsor [the] bill that would bring this about.

=== 2024–2029 Parliament ===
==== First reading ====
In the first session of the 2024–2029 Parliament, Roz Savage (Lib Dem) introduced the bill (Bill 14) on 16 October 2024. Savage was drawn third in the 2024 private members' bill ballot and, unlike earlier presentations of the bill, was offered priority parliamentary time for the bill to progress.

The bill's co-sponsors were Carla Denyer (Green), Clive Lewis (Labour), Simon Opher (Labour), Nadia Whittome (Labour), Olivia Blake (Labour), Alex Sobel (Labour/Co-op), Roger Gale (Conservative), Simon Hoare (Conservative), Pippa Heylings (Lib Dem), Kirsty Blackman (SNP) and Llinos Medi (Plaid Cymru).

==== Second reading ====
Its second reading took place on 24 January 2025, where MPs from across the parties largely spoke in favour, although some Conservatives did not and—unusually for a sitting Friday—the debate was interrupted for a defence statement.

During the debate, Savage emphasised the urgency of tackling the climate-nature crisis, citing worsening environmental standards in the UK across the world. Labour, Conservative, Lib Dem and Green MPs also contributed, highlighting local impacts, like flooding in Morecambe and species loss in Cannock Chase. Savage also said:

Taking bold action on climate and nature is the best way for the [Labour] Government to demonstrate true global leadership—and do what is right—knowing that, in the long run, the cost of inaction is far, far greater than the cost of action. Are we willing today to do what is required in the long term, rather than what is expedient in the short term? Are we willing to do not what is politically possible, but what is scientifically necessary to ensure a future for our planet? The choice is ours, and the time is now. Let us be the generation who chose to save our natural world, not the generation who stood by and watched it die.

On the connections between climate, nature and the economic cost, (Labour co-sponsor) Clive Lewis highlighted that "[we] cannot have growth on a dead planet"—whilst (Conservative co-sponsor) Simon Hoare added:

If not now, when? I do not believe that we can afford not to do this. Failure to do so would be the longest suicide note in history for our species.

Critics, including Andrew Bowie on the Opposition Frontbench, argued the bill "risks" jobs and energy security by ending fossil fuel use "too rapidly", but his Conservative colleague, (co-sponsor) Roger Gale, argued that:

If we do not listen, we are about to become the authors of our own demise—and that is why I believe that the bill deserves, at the very least, a second reading.

The Labour Government via, Mary Creagh, outlined Labour's plans, such as Great British Energy and the Water (Special Measures) Act. When urged by Calum Miller (Lib Dem) and Simon Opher (Labour), Creagh pledged "meaningful change" in the Government's approach, "binding commitments on nature provisions" and "continued dialogue"—but did not endorse the proposed legislation. This was regretted by Lewis, who had said:

If we want a sustainable economy and sustainable biodiversity, and if we want to protect nature, ensure that future generations have somewhere to live, and have food security and water security, we need to ensure that this bill—or something like it—becomes law. We need to ensure that Labour [does] the right thing for climate and nature. It is what our constituents want to see.

A Government Whip, Christian Wakeford, moved to adjourn the debate at the close of Creagh's speech, preventing any backbench MP from seeking (to close the debate and) move a substantive vote on the bill itself. The (then) Green Party co-leader, Carla Denyer, advocated for a substantive vote. Savage opted against it, having securing certain "concessions" from Ministers—an effort which was praised by Pippa Heylings (Lib Dem)—who suggested that the Labour Government's "commitments will enable us to move forward. Not at the pace that we want, but together".

A vote (division 91) took place on Wakeford's motion to adjourn—and effectively end—the progression of the bill. 7 MPs voted against and 120 Labour MPs voted in favour of adjourning the debate, including 13 Labour supporters of the bill (Adam Thompson, Andrew Cooper, Anna Dixon, Fleur Anderson, Ian Murray, John Whitby, Josh Newbury, Lee Pitcher, Naushabah Khan, Phil Brickell, Rachel Hopkins, Tris Osborne and 2021–2022 co-sponsor, Barry Gardiner). Lib Dem MPs and certain Labour MPs abstained.

==== Government whip ====
The Government did not offer MPs a free vote on the bill. News reports at the time outlined that backbench Labour MPs were whipped to, if necessary, oppose the bill—or otherwise to talk it out. Private members' bills are not usually subject to a Government position, and the Government Whips' decision was opposed by campaigners and some MPs.

Barry Gardiner, for example, had previously called a Johnson Government whip on his Employment and Trade Union Rights Bill "cowardly" said, at his bill's second reading on 22 October 2021, that:

It is remarkable that the [Conservative] Government have imposed a three-line whip against [my private member's bill]. Why? In politics, it is rare to find something that absolutely everyone agrees on. So why are the Government determined to block [my] bill?

Alongside Gardiner's 'fire and rehire bill' being blocked, campaigners also cited the Thatcher Government whip on Richard Shepherd's Protection of Official Information Bill. At Shepard's second reading on 15 January 1988, MPs called the imposition of the whip "misconceived, authoritarian, and a sorry display of Executive arrogance" and "an utter disgrace [which] ought to [have been] rejected decisively". During that debate, former Conservative Prime Minister Edward Heath said:

By decreeing a whip, the Government are challenging the whole basis of private members' time. This is the first occasion that anyone can recall, or find in history, on which a whip of this kind has been issued. If we allow this to pass today, it will be cited in future by the Government as a satisfactory precedent for imposing whips on private members' legislation. That is entirely unacceptable.

During the 24 January 2025 debate, known private members' bill opponent Christopher Chope (Conservative) asked:

Is it true that the [Labour] Government are intent on kicking the [Climate and Nature Bill] into the long grass because they do not want to be seen to be opposing it, yet they do not really support it?

The MPs who voted against the motion to adjourn the Climate and Nature Bill were Chope, Shockat Adam (Independent), Siân Berry (Green), Carla Denyer (Green), Rosie Duffield (Independent), Iqbal Mohamed (Independent) and Adrian Ramsay (Green). Ellie Chowns (Green) and Jeremy Corbyn (Independent) acted as tellers. During the second reading debate, Denyer said that:

In the second reading of the Terminally Ill Adults (End of Life) Bill, we heard powerful arguments about how it could be improved, but MPs voted for it to progress because there was an agreement that it warranted further scrutiny. The same applies with [this bill], [which] has been going for four years, and has had cross-party support throughout. We [should have got] the bill to committee stage.

==== Adjournment reactions ====
Following the adjourned second reading of the bill, some MPs, media outlets, campaigners, and members of the public expressed their disappointment in the decision not to push the bill to a substantive vote; including the National Education Union, British Ecological Society and PCS Workers for Climate Justice.

Government whips—in seeking to avoid a backbench rebellion, and a potential, embarrassing defeat—instead committed to further engagement between Ministers, Labour MPs and Savage on the intended outcomes of the bill.

Zero Hour expressed its disappointment that the Labour Government did not offer a free vote so that all MPs, including the 192 supporting MPs, could vote with their conscience. Some campaigners praised the efforts of Savage in securing "assurances" from Creagh that next steps will include "binding commitments" to advance the bill's objectives—and welcomed Ed Miliband's promise to "set to work" on the bill’s objectives, "including for legislation", so that "[we] can make a meaningful difference for climate and nature".

==== Government response ====
As the Labour Government did not allow the bill to progress to committee stage, after the 24 January adjournment, Savage said that:

The Government has committed to a number of measures around the restoration of nature, accounting for emissions and nature impacts overseas, public engagement, and closer collaboration between the Climate Change Committee and the Joint Nature Conservation Committee—and between the two key ministries that are responsible for our environment—including the Secretaries of State presenting an annual statement on progress made on climate and nature.

Giving evidence to the Environmental Audit Committee on 27 January 2025, Ed Miliband emphasised the need for a mission-driven government to address the intertwined crises of climate and nature, distinguishing it from previous approaches focussed solely on carbon budgets. Miliband praised the bill, and expressed his intention to foster a political consensus through an annual climate and nature statement to Parliament and the public. The annual statement would, Miliband said, detail the Government's knowledge of the crises, actions being taken, and ways the public can participate—aiming to "bridge gaps between the Carbon Budget Delivery Plan and Environmental Improvement Plan".

At a subsequent session of the Committee on 24 March 2025, the then Secretary of State for the Environment—Steve Reed—said that he "was disappointed that [the bill] didn't proceed", that he "very much agreed with the proposals in the bill", and that he hoped to "find other ways to achieve it".

The Labour Government's official commitments to Savage were not published publicly, but following written parliamentary questions by (Labour co-sponsors) Simon Opher and Nadia Whittome and other MPs, Creagh set out that the Government will "strengthen the narrative on consumption emissions" and "restore and protect our natural world" by:

- developing a new, statutory plan to protect and restore our natural environment with delivery information to help meet each of [the UK's] ambitious Environment Act targets
- building on, and strengthening, relationships between the Joint Nature Conservation Committee, the Climate Change Committee, and the Special representatives for nature and climate at a more strategic level, and
- taking forward the spirit and substance of the bill with its sponsors [and setting out] an update on these steps in a ministerial [climate and nature] statement by the autumn of 2025.

==== Current status ====
On 1 May 2025, marking six years since the Commons declared an environment and climate change emergency, Clive Lewis, Roz Savage—and four Labour co-sponsors of the Bill—tabled Early Day Motion 1184, observing that "the second reading debate of the Bill was adjourned, but not concluded, on 24 January 2025" and urged the Labour Government "to allocate parliamentary time for further debate on the bill to address [these] critical challenges".

According to the Commons website, the next stage for the bill is its resumed second reading. This began on 24 January 2025, when it was adjourned, but did not continue on 11 July 2025. On that day, a motion for the "resumption of [the] adjourned debate on [the] Question [of] 24 January, That the Bill be now read a Second time" was objected to. The date of the resumed second reading was then set for 29 May 2026.

The first annual climate and nature statement to Parliament was made by Ed Miliband on 14 July 2025, where he "updated Parliament on the actions on climate and nature that we agreed with the sponsors of the Climate and Nature Bill" and set out that the Government would:

- introduce a bill by the end of [2025] to enable ratification of the Biodiversity Beyond National Jurisdiction Agreement [and that] the Environment Secretary had appointed 48 county and combined authorities to lead the creation of Local Nature Recovery Strategies
- [ensure] UK decarbonisation efforts lead to a true reduction in global emissions, [and that] the Government was developing the UK's carbon border adjustment mechanism to tackle the risk of carbon leakage and encourage a circular economy, domestically and internationally, to reduce waste and emissions
- continue to engage with the public through the statement and beyond [and that a] Net Zero Public Participation Strategy would be published [to] lay out the Government's objectives for engaging the public
- [support] the Joint Nature Conservation Committee and the Climate Change Committee data sharing agreement to help tackle these intertwined crises, [as those bodies would] bring to bear a wealth of expertise in an integrated way, [and help] the Government shape the right solutions for climate and nature.

In response to a written question by Rosie Duffield (Independent) on 25 July 2025, Creagh added that:

The Government's climate and nature priorities and policies will be further set out [in 2025 via] a revised Environmental Improvement Plan, updated delivery plan for Carbon Budgets 4-6 and [the UK's] Nationally Determined Contributions, Food Strategy, Farming Roadmap, and Land Use Framework.

At the first anniversary of the bill's second reading on Savage highlighted that her negotiations led the Labour Government to adopt several of the bill's goals.

Following Miliband's July 2025 commitments, the Biodiversity Beyond National Jurisdiction Act 2026 has passed into law, some Local Nature Recovery Strategies are being deployed, and the Carbon Border Adjustment Mechanism is set for 2027. Further steps includes a new Climate and Nature Participation Hub, enhanced data sharing between the Joint Nature Conservation Committee and the Climate Change Committee, and the launch of a £1 billion Local Power Plan.

== Zero Hour campaign ==
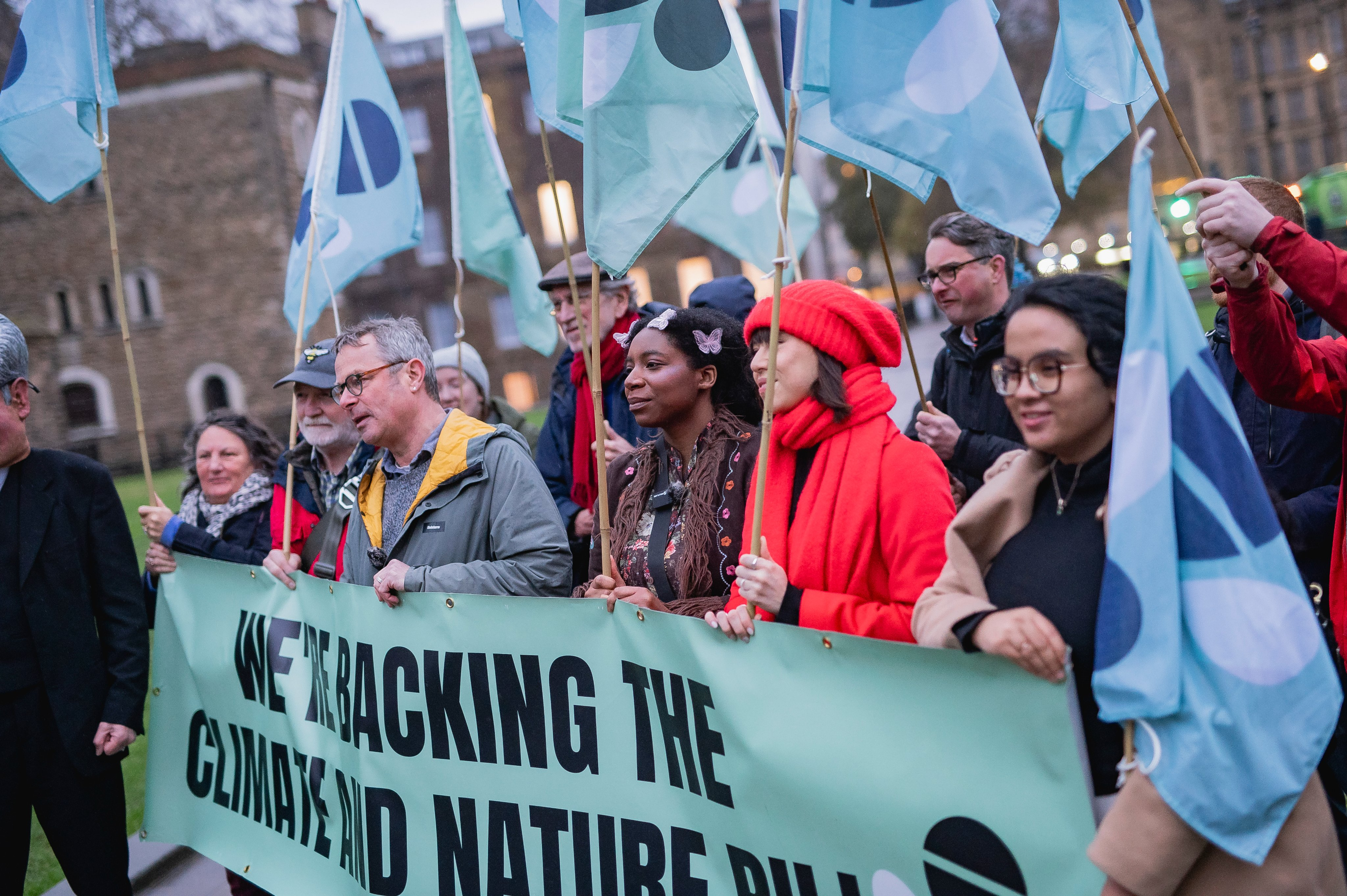
CAN Bill campaigners outside Westminster on the day of the Bill's second reading in the Commons, 24 January 2025.

Zero Hour is a 75,000 person-strong non-profit grassroots campaign working to build cross-party support for the bill. They work to persuade MPs, Peers, mayors, councillors, local authorities, electoral candidates, and political parties to endorse the proposed legislation. A range of businesses, students' unions, trade unions, community groups, NGOs, charities, farming and food groups, co-operatives, Olympians, activists and celebrities—including Chris Packham, Deborah Meaden, Liz Bonnin, Tori Tsui, Dominique Palmer, Amir Khan GP and Hugh Fearnley-Whittingstall—have backed the bill.

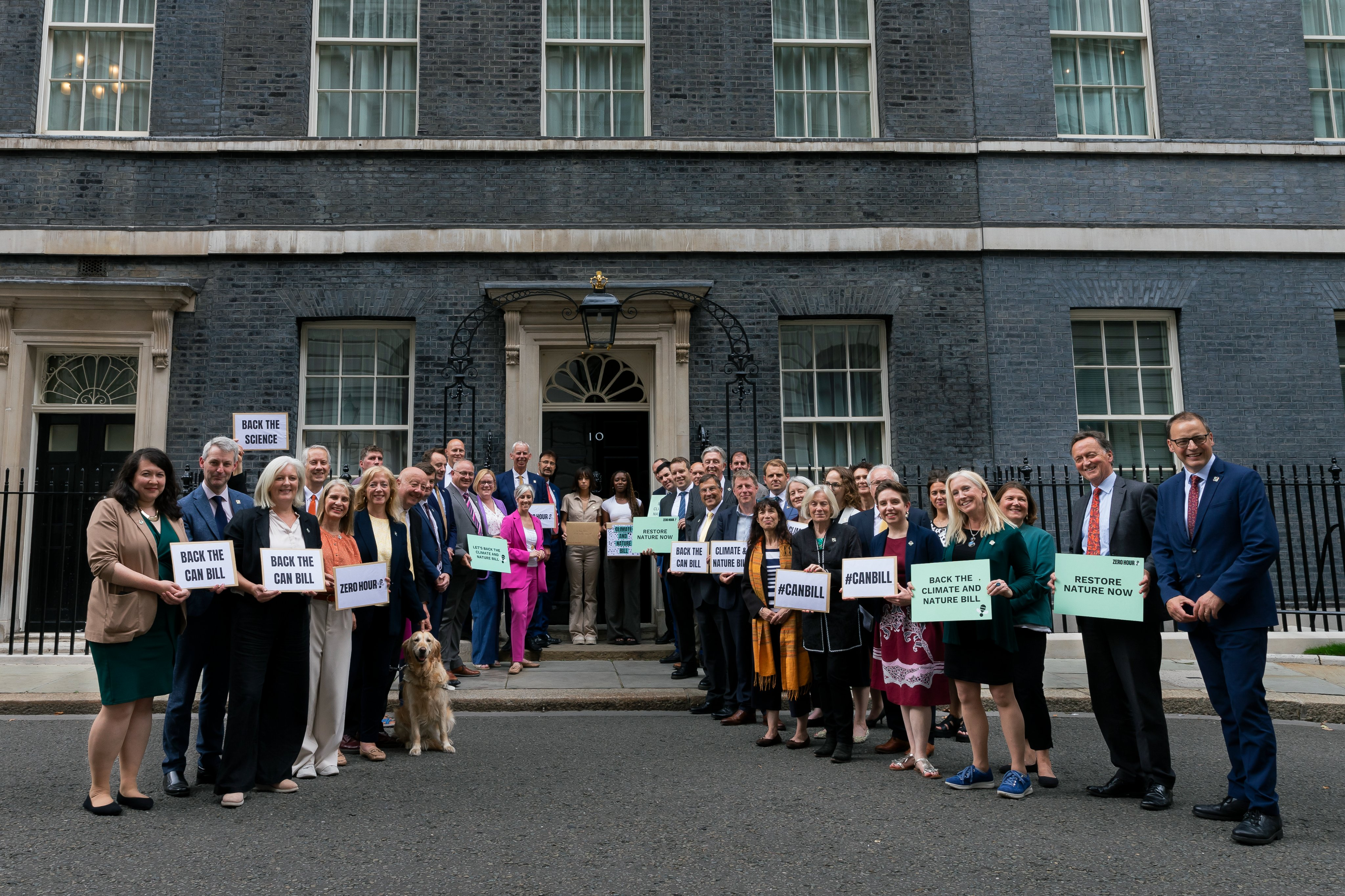
Supporting MPs and Peers delivering an open letter to the Prime Minister, urging the Government to support the Bill.

=== Nature and Climate Declaration ===
Over 2022, Zero Hour organised a UK-wide, all-party initiative—a Nature and Climate Declaration—to attract the support of councillors, elected mayors, and devolved legislators in Scotland, Wales and Northern Ireland to the key principles of the bill.

Conservatives Andrew Boff and Sandesh Gulhane were signatories, alongside Welsh Labour's Jenny Rathbone. The then leaders of Alliance and SDLP—Naomi Long and Colum Eastwood—supported the Declaration, as did the People Before Profit MLA Gerry Carroll, and DUP councillor, Stephen Ross. Angus Robertson (the SNP Government Secretary for the Constitution) was also a signatory, as was Lorna Slater (then, Scottish Greens co-leader).

It was signed by over 2,000 politicians across the UK nations when launched, and was debated in the Commons via a cross-party initiative led by (the then Conservative MP) Derek Thomas on November 2022. In that debate, and on behalf of the Labour Party, Ruth Jones set out that a Labour Government would deliver a science-led, joined-up plan to tackle the climate and ecological emergency—adding that:

Tackling biodiversity loss, climate change, and the environmental risks to the health of the public is the challenge of our time. This important declaration and the [bill] alongside it will be a huge step towards achieving those aims. [Labour] understands the importance of the UK doing its fair share to cut emissions in order to stay below 1.5°C of global warming, [and has] committed to a robust 'net zero and nature test' for every policy. We know that climate action must be nature-positive action, and that we must halt and reverse the loss of biodiversity by 2030 for the benefit of all people and the planet.

Jones also criticised the Conservative Government's "inconsistent" policies, citing new oil licenses and coal mines, and their "inadequate" Environment Act targets. The responding minister, Trudy Harrison (Conservative), defended the Government's net zero progress, tree planting, and peatland restoration—denying an "attack on nature". Caroline Lucas (Green) and Barry Gardiner (Labour) stressed the urgency of tackling the interconnected crises, whilst Wera Hobhouse (Lib Dem) praised the Declaration and the bill's "holistic" approach.

In Government, Labour Party spokespeople maintain their commitments to "achieving clean power by 2030" and meeting statutory Environment Act targets, though the party has faced criticism from campaigners for blocking the bill in favour of its own Environmental Improvement Plan and Carbon Budget and Growth Delivery Plan.

=== Scientists ===
Some 1,200 scientists, including Venki Ramakrishnan, David King, Partha Dasgupta, John O'Keefe, John Walker, Michael Levitt, Richard Roberts—and E.J. Milner-Gulland, Nathalie Pettorelli, Paul Behrens and Charlie Gardner—have called on the UK Government and MPs to support the bill.

Dasgupta, who led the HM Treasury-commissioned report, The Economics of Biodiversity, wrote—in a Zero Hour briefing, Follow the Science: The need for a Climate and Nature Act—that:

We are facing the greatest crises of our time, which calls for bold, transformational thinking. A Climate and Nature Act would set the most up-to-date science into UK legislation, ensuring that our natural world is being valued and prioritised across all governmental decision-making.

=== Environment NGOs ===
The bill is also supported by a wide variety organisations, including The Wildlife Trusts, The National Trust, Climate Coalition, Wildfowl and Wetlands Trust, CPRE: The Countryside Charity, Greenpeace, Friends of the Earth, Surfers Against Sewage, Faith for the Climate and Nature Friendly Farming Network.

Ahead of the bill's second reading on 24 January 2005, The National Trust and The Wildlife Trusts urged the Labour Government to "lead by example, both domestically and on the international stage", in support of Savage's plan. Harry Bowell, on behalf of "the biggest conservation charity in Europe", said:

The bill is a major opportunity for MPs to press the [Labour] Government for more meaningful and urgent action to tackle the nature and climate crisis. We remain one of the most nature-depleted countries in the world. Our built and natural landscapes are experiencing increasingly frequent and ferocious weather events.

Similarly, Joan Edwards at The Wildlife Trusts said:

The [Labour] Government must back up its bold election promise to reverse the tide of destruction of the natural environment with cast iron, scientifically credible steps to meet our legally binding 2030 nature targets, especially as their own Office for Environmental Protection warns we are severely off track.

=== Campaigns, charities and businesses ===
Zero Hour's other partners (of which there are close to 1,000 supporting organisations) include The Co-operative Bank, Ecotricity, Patagonia, Natura, SUEZ, The Women's Institute, UK Youth Climate Coalition, Oxfam, A Rocha, The Body Shop, Lush, Triodos Bank, Ecosia, Extinction Rebellion, UK Youth for Nature and Greener Jobs Alliance.

=== Trade unions ===
17 trade union leaders publicly support the bill—including Zero Hour allies, National Education Union and Bakers, Food and Allied Workers Union—plus Public and Commercial Services Union, British Medical Association, University and College Union, Equity, Artists Union of England, National Union of Students, General Federation of Trade Unions, Pharmacists Defence Association Union, Association of Educational Psychologists, National House Building Council Staff Association, Social Workers Union, National Association of Probation Officers and Prison Officers Association.

On 4 June 2025, leaders representing these unions—plus those of Aegis, Hospital Consultants and Specialists Association, Fire Brigades Union, Independent Workers Union, Writers Guild, Transport Salaried Staffs Association and National Association of Head Teachers—called on Keir Starmer to allow Government time to continue the debate for the bill.

=== Faith organisations ===
Leaders representing the UK's main faith denominations have called on MPs to support the bill including Graham Usher (Anglican), Rowan Williams (Church in Wales), Jonathan Wittenberg (Judaism), Kamran Shezad (Muslim), John Arnold (Catholic), Olivia Graham (Anglican), Adwoa Burnley (Quaker), Elizabeth Slade (Unitarian), Olivia Fuchs (Buddhist), Trupti Patel (Hindu) and Richard Murray (Scottish Episcopal).

== Reactions ==
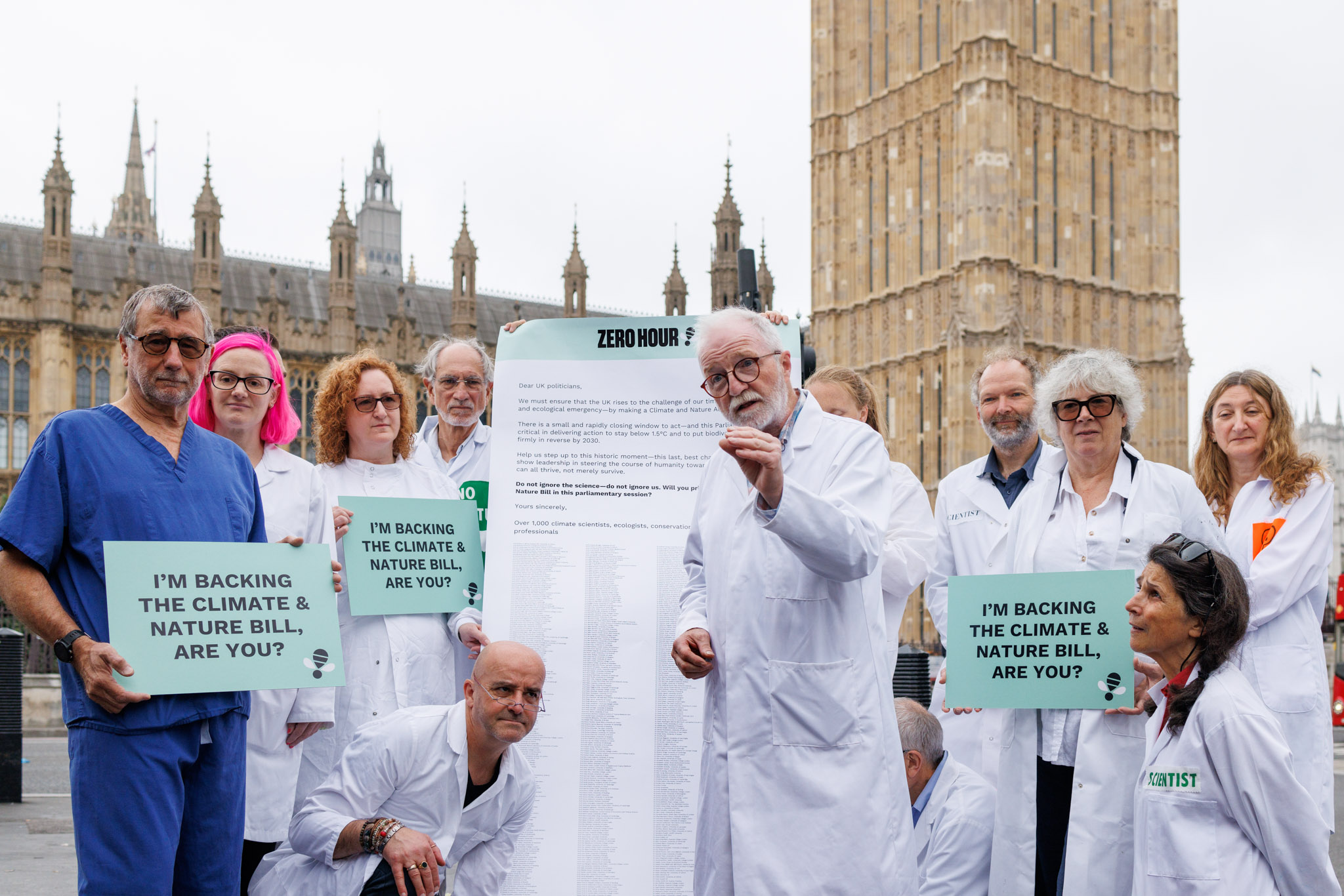
George McGavin and fellow supporting scientists and health professionals in Westminster, urging MPs to support the Bill.

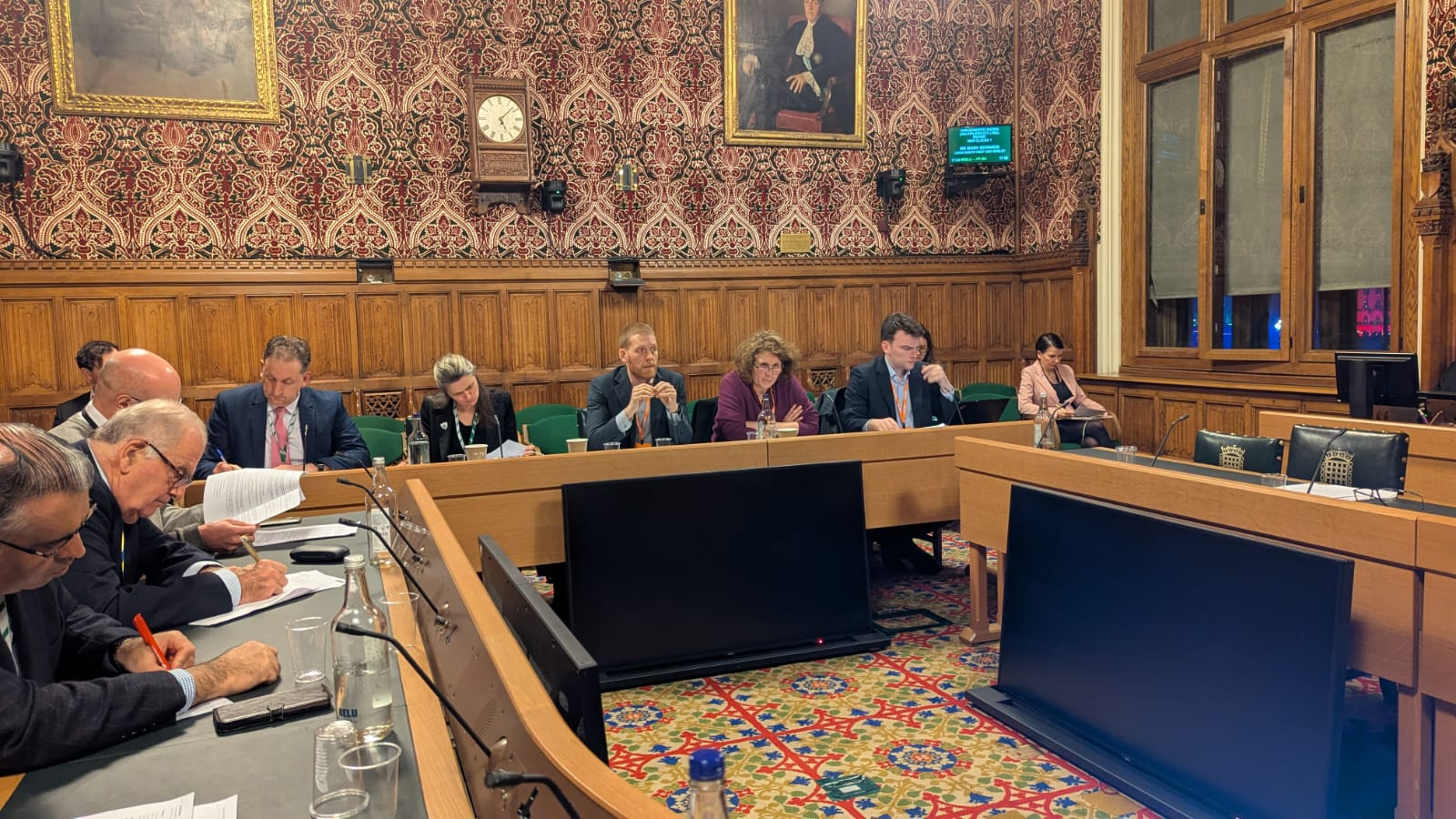
Paul Behrens and Nathalie Pettorelli briefing MPs on the CAN Bill in the House of Commons.

Rob Hopkins, Transition Network co-founder, wrote that:

A future in which this bill has been implemented would be the time of our lives. Anything would feel possible. We would feel like there was, finally, a shared collective purpose. It would be transformative. Our cities would fill with trees, delicious air, gardens, and wildlife. Our countryside would once again buzz with biodiversity and wildness. While the impacts of climate change that we are already locked into wouldn't magically disappear, we would know we were now heading for a future that was the result of our having done everything we could possibly have done—rather than the result of our inaction, apathy, and political paralysis.

John Harris, columnist for The Guardian, wrote that:

The bill is a neat means of doing two things. It highlights how much our politicians are defying the urgency of the moment and—by presenting clear and precise proposals to drastically reduce carbon emissions and restore biodiversity in the same typefaces and official vocabulary as the laws that define whole swathes of our lives—it makes the prospect of radical action eminently imaginable.

George Monbiot, journalist, author, and environmental activist, wrote in The Guardian that:

One of three big policies I would try to insert into the Labour Party's 2024 manifesto is the Climate and Nature Bill, drafted by the Zero Hour campaign, which was [first] presented to Parliament by Caroline Lucas in 2020. Unlike current environmental laws, it tracks both the science and our international commitments. It would bring our reliance on fossil fuels to an end as quickly as possible, and restore and expand our ecosystems.

Dale Vince, a green energy industrialist and founder of Ecotricity, said that:

If we're serious about tackling the biggest threat we face, climate breakdown and nature's destruction, we need the right laws to guide us, and we need them fast. Let's be real, we've got a small window left, and the next five years are make or break. That's where the bill comes in. It's the only thing out there that tackles the twin crises of climate and biodiversity at the same time.

Chris Skidmore, former Minister of State for Energy and chair of the Net Zero Review (commissioned by the then Business and Energy Secretary, Jacob Rees-Mogg, in 2022), wrote in Labour List that:

It's time for a new generation to carry us forward. A Climate and Nature Act can deliver the bold, new, science-led framework Britain needs, and begin to restore the UK's position as a leader on climate and nature action. As the Climate Change Act did in 2008, this is the moment to offer hope. Hope that—yes—this generation of political leaders can turn the tide.

George McGavin, a zoologist, entomologist, and Oxford University Museum of Natural History research associate, wrote in Comment Central that:

The UK already has the Climate Change and Environment Acts. Are they not enough? Sadly, no. Since the Climate Change Act was made, our understanding of the 1.5°C target has changed significantly. Sticking to these now outdated targets would leave the UK missing its international 2030 commitment by a third. The Environment Act is not strong enough either, as we have signed up to more ambitious global targets since [2021], with the aim of reversing nature loss by 2030, not just halting species populations decline by then.

Nathalie Pettorelli (Zoological Society of London) and Paul Behrens (University of Oxford) wrote in The Conversation that:

What we do now will dictate the future of our planet and our society. The bill presents us with a clear choice: we can either rise to the challenge of our time, safeguarding our planet and future generations, or continue down the path to destruction. The science is clear, the solutions are within reach, and the bill provides the roadmap.

Olympians, Etienne Stott (canoeist) and Sarah Winckless (rower), said that:

The bill is about recognising the contribution and importance of nature, and protecting it forwards for future generations. We know how critical it is to restore nature and protect critical ecosystems here in the UK, and around the world. Healthy rivers, oceans, and waterways are essential. Not only the future of our sports, but also the future of our health.

=== Similar proposals ===
In the UK, some commentators have called for similar legislation to simultaneously address climate, nature, and public health challenges. Others, such as WWF UK, have proposed legislation to tackle a "triple challenge" of climate, nature and food security via a similarly joined up approach.

Internationally, several other jurisdictions have enacted or proposed similar joined-up legislation. The European Union's Nature Restoration Law mandates ecosystem recovery as a primary mechanism for achieving climate neutrality. Chile's Framework Law on Climate Change legally binds sector-specific carbon budgets to biodiversity goals. The Bahamas passed a Climate Change and Carbon Market Initiatives Act, which utilises blue carbon to link marine conservation directly to climate finance. Australia established a Nature Repair Market to facilitate private investment in projects that provide dual benefits for carbon sequestration and biodiversity restoration.

== Supporters ==
According to the Zero Hour campaign, which coordinates the Climate and Nature Bill campaign, 192 MPs, 54 Peers, 386 local councils and the London Assembly are backing the bill—plus (metro mayors) Sadiq Khan, Tracy Brabin, Andy Burnham and David Skaith.

The Alliance Party, Green Party, Liberal Democrats, Plaid Cymru, Social Democratic and Labour Party, Yorkshire Party, Wales Green Party, True and Fair Party, Volt UK and Mebyon Kernow officially support the proposed legislation.

=== MPs ===
According to Zero Hour, the bill is currently backed by 192 MPs, comprising 89 from Labour and Labour/Co-op, 72 Liberal Democrats, 7 from the SNP, 5 Independents, 4 from Plaid Cymru, 4 Greens, 4 from the Independent Alliance, 2 from the SDLP, 2 Conservatives, 1 from the Alliance Party, 1 from the DUP, and 1 from Your Party.

MP support by party (as of February 2026)
Party	Supporters
Labour and Labour/Co-operative	89
Liberal Democrats	72
Scottish National Party	7
Independents	5
Plaid Cymru	4
Green Party of England & Wales	4
Independent Alliance	4
Social Democratic & Labour Party	2
Conservative & Unionist Party	2
Alliance Party of Northern Ireland	1
Democratic Unionist Party	1
Your Party	1
Total	192

=== Peers ===
In the House of Lords, 54 peers have pledged their support, including Lord Knight (Labour/Co-op), Lord Goldsmith (Conservative), Baroness Boycott (Crossbench), Baroness Parminter (Lib Dem), Baroness Bennett (Green), Baroness Smith of Llanfaes (Plaid Cymru) and the Lord Bishop of Norwich.

=== Devolved legislators ===
There are also supporters of the bill in the Scottish and Welsh Parliaments, where the issue of tackling the climate-nature crisis has received some attention—including Monica Lennon (Scottish Labour/Co-op), all of the Scottish Green MSPs, several Plaid Cymru MSs and Jane Dodds (Welsh Lib Dem MS).

=== Party youth wings ===
The youth wings of several political parties are behind the bill, including Alliance Youth, Plaid Ifanc, Young Greens and Young Welsh Greens.

=== Labour party ===
The Labour Party, as HM Opposition over the 2019–2024 Parliament, supported Olivia Blake's introduction of the bill in May 2023, when the party announced its support for the bill's "ambition and objectives" and (the then Shadow Secretary of State for Energy Security and Net Zero) Ed Miliband said that "we need ambitious and urgent action to tackle the climate and environmental emergencies together; and cut bills, give us energy security, and create good jobs in the process".

==== Labour grassroots ====
At Labour's 2023 annual conference, a motion forwarded by Constituency Labour Parties (CLPs) calling on the party to officially support the bill (entitled, 'Climate Change and Ecology') received 72,289 votes from voting delegates, but it was not selected for further discussion or debate. At the 2024 conference, (Labour donor) Dale Vince endorsed the bill as "the Climate Change Act 2 the UK needs".

==== Similar legislative efforts ====
Also, whilst in Opposition, Labour sought to amend the Environment Act to ensure the UK began to reverse the decline in the state of nature in England no later than 2030; as well as the (failed) Offshore Petroleum Licensing Bill to recognise the importance of limiting global warming to 1.5°C. Each of these Labour-led or -supported amendments aligns with the climate and nature targets of the Climate and Nature Bill.

==== 2024 manifesto ====
In its 2024 manifesto, the Labour Party's recommendations included pledges related to the bill, including promises to "deliver for nature [and] to work in partnership with civil society, communities and business to restore and protect our natural world", and to mandate "UK-regulated financial institutions and FTSE 100 companies to implement credible transition plans that align with the 1.5°C goal of the Paris Agreement". It also recognised that "the climate and nature crisis is the greatest, long-term, global challenge that we face".

==== Labour MPs ====
89 Labour and Labour/Co-op MPs support the bill, including Sarah Champion, Afzal Khan, Chi Onwurah, Louise Haigh—plus Satvir Kaur, Rachel Hopkins, Navendu Mishra, Emma Hardy, Ashley Dalton, Fleur Anderson and Ian Murray—alongside Andrew Cooper, Steve Witherden, Scott Arthur, and Julia Buckley. The official Labour environment campaign, SERA, supports the bill and many of its members are supporters.

==== Labour peers ====
The 17 Labour supporters in the Lords include (Peers for the Planet director) Lord Whitty, Baroness Lawrence, Baroness Bakewell, Baroness Lister, Lord Hain, Lord Hendy and Lord Smith of Finsbury.

==== Labour councils ====
Of 386 supporting local councils, 24 Labour-led local authorities have passed motions in support of the bill—including Birmingham, Camden, Ealing, Exeter, Hackney, High Peak, Islington, Lewisham, Manchester, Newcastle, Norwich, Nottingham, Oldham, Oxford, Salisbury and Westminster councils. 561 Labour politicians signed Zero Hour's Climate and Nature Declaration.

As an Ealing councillor, Deirdre Costigan proposed a motion to support the bill on 19 October 2021. She is yet to add her support as the Labour MP for Ealing Southall.

Two other Labour MPs, Alison Hume and Luke Akehurst, backed the bill ahead of the 2021 elections, when over 1,000 candidates supported a Zero Hour pledge campaign—but neither have confirmed their support as the MPs for Scarborough and North Durham. As Labour's then candidate for Police, Fire and Crime Commissioner, Hume said that the climate emergency is "the most important challenge facing the world", adding that she was "proud to join colleagues in the Labour Party in publicly supporting the bill [and if] elected, [would] work to make the bill law".

=== Conservative politicians ===
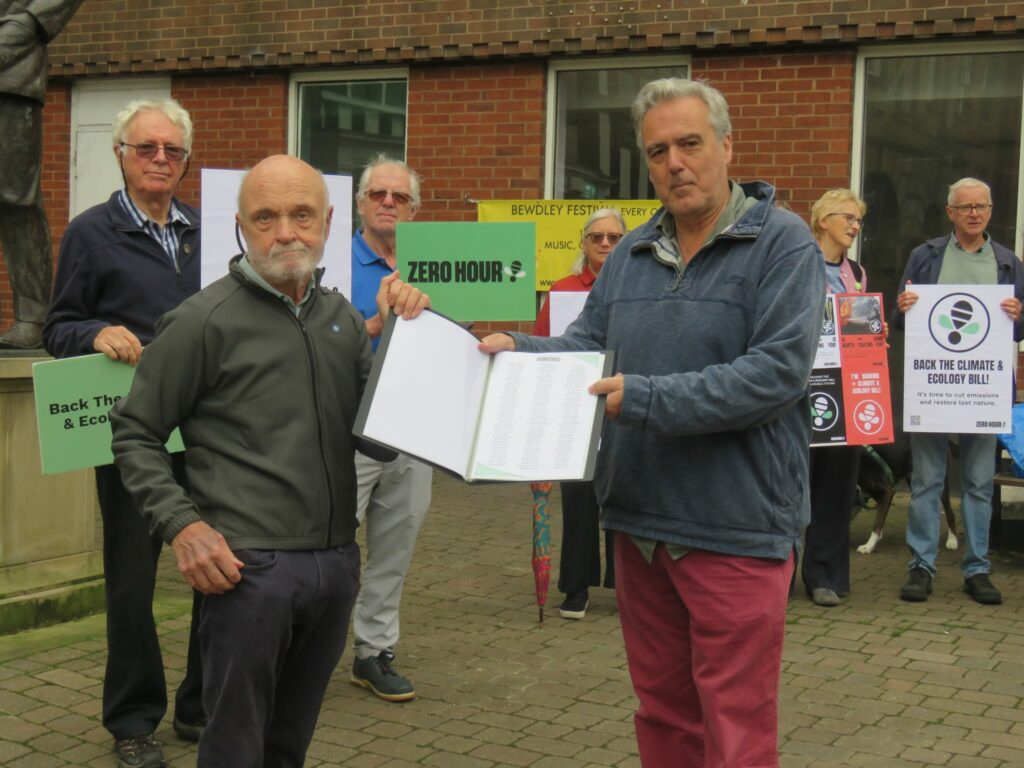
CAN Bill campaigners in Wyre Forest call on Mark Garnier MP to support the campaign.

Currently, Simon Hoare and Roger Gale are the Conservative supporters in the Commons. They are also both co-sponsors of Savage's bill. Before his re-election in 2024, Mark Garnier said that he "support[s] the aims" of the bill, but the Shadow Economic Secretary is yet to confirm his support.

Four Conservative Peers are supporters, including (former Minister for Energy, Climate and Environment) Lord Goldsmith. Conservative-led councils passed supporting motions on the bill over 2019–2024—including Cornwall, Devon and Shropshire—and 161 Conservative politicians signed Zero Hour's Climate and Nature Declaration.

==== Individuals’ support ====
In the 2019–2024 Parliament, Conservative supporters included Roger Gale and (former MPs) Peter Bottomley and Derek Thomas. Thomas said, when announcing his support, that:

Our response to the climate-nature crisis must be about seizing the future, and that's why I'm proud to support this bold, new legislative plan. [The bill] should be embraced by decision-makers at all levels. It's nothing to fear, and builds on the policies and commitments that the [Conservative] Government has already made. It calls for a joined up plan to tackle climate and nature issues, hand in hand, and is exactly what's needed. There's no time to waste.

In July 2022, former Minister for the Environment, Bottomley commented—in echoing Margaret Thatcher's November 1989 speech at the UN General Assembly—that "environmentally-positive legislation is a truly Conservative commitment". The former Father of the House also said on his Facebook page that:

The cost of inaction far outweighs the cost of legislation. Standing by is not an option. It's a huge challenge, but there is hope. We can work together across borders with governments, companies, communities, and others who have the will to act and the power to transform our world. Climate change knows no borders. It will not stop at one nation's doorstep, or overlook those who did or did not respond in good time. We must act now.

The former leader of the Scottish Conservatives, Douglas Ross, said he would have considered "signing the bill when it [came] to the Commons for a vote". Former MP, Laurence Robertson, told BBC News that he supported "the aims and principles of the bill" on 15 June 2022. Robertson did not confirm his full support.

In June 2021, the former Conservative and now Labour MP Christian Wakeford said that he was "supportive of the bill", and the former Conservative Minister of State for Energy, Chris Skidmore, said that "a Climate and Nature Act can deliver the bold, new, science-led framework Britain needs".

==== Conservative peers ====
In the Lords, Conservative peers, Lord Goldsmith, (former Minister for Energy and Climate Change) Baroness Verma, and (former Minister for Energy) Baroness Hooper support the bill, as does (Theresa May's former environment adviser) Lord Randall.

=== Other political support ===
==== Opposition parties ====
The Liberal Democrats have supported the bill since its introduction—and at all government levels where they have representation. Their leader, Ed Davey, and deputy leader, Daisy Cooper, have acted as co-sponsors of the bill. Savage and Redesdale, as primary sponsors in the Commons and Lords, have been supported by all Lib Dem MPs, 32 Lib Dem Peers, 17 Lib Dem-led councils—including Richmond, Bath and North East Somerset and Watford—and 487 Lib Dem signatories of Zero Hour's Climate and Nature Declaration.

Davey said, before COP26—"[our] last, best hope to stop world-changing climate change"—that:

The climate is changing before our eyes. We are seeing flash flooding in London and heat waves across the country. We need to act now—and this bill is our way to do that. [By backing] this bill, [the Conservative Government could have shown] the world we are acting to cut emissions and stop the climate emergency.

Ahead of Savage's second reading in January 2025, 58 Lib Dem Parliamentarians—including Cooper and (the then co-deputy leader in the Lords) Baroness Walmsley—urged Keir Starmer to "showcase cross-party consensus on the need for an integrated approach to the climate-nature crisis", adding:

We, Liberal Democrats, commend your and the Government's determination to elevate the UK's global climate and nature leadership. However, without legislation that unites our climate and nature plans, they will continue to be developed in isolation. This means your clean energy and nature restoration ambitions may fail—and, equally worryingly—may make both crises worse.

The Green Party has also supported the bill since its first introduction in 2020 and, unlike the Lib Dems, pledged to "deliver a Climate and Nature Act" in their 2024 Westminster manifesto to "address the full extent of the climate and nature crisis in line with the most up-to-date science—and ensure a comprehensive and joined-up approach to the ecological emergency." Zack Polanski, now leader of the Green Party, proposed a successful motion at the London Assembly in 2021, saying that:

[The bill] puts in place the strong and decisive action needed to reverse the climate and ecological crisis. [The Assembly's] support for this sends a message to the Government that the UK must play its fair and proper role in reducing greenhouse gas [emissions] and protecting and restoring biodiverse habitats. We can make sure London leads the way, just like the Assembly did in 2018 by urging the Mayor of London to declare a climate emergency. As chair of C40 Cities, and a supporter of UK100's Net Zero Pledge, the Mayor can and should support this motion.

Plaid Cymru, Social Democratic and Labour Party and Alliance Party of Northern Ireland officially support the bill.

==== London Assembly and Mayor ====
As above, on 2 December 2021, the London Assembly passed a cross-party motion to back the bill proposed by Zack Polanski (Green) and Leonie Cooper (Labour/Co-op). The Mayor of London, Sadiq Khan, subsequently confirmed his support on 15 July 2022. Khan's deputy mayor, Mete Coban, and other metro-mayors also support the bill.

==== Local councils ====
According to Zero Hour, 386 community, parish, town, district, borough, metropolitan, city, county, and unitary councils have passed motions in support of the bill. Some local mayors are also supporters.

== Opposition and criticism ==
According to The Guardian, before the 24 January 2025 debate of Savage's bill, Labour Ministers "insisted" on the removal of clauses that would have required the UK to meet the targets agreed to at COPs and other international summits. A Labour source was quoted as saying that the bill, as it stood, would have "forced the Government to renegotiate" its international climate change agreements.

Many Conservatives—including Andrew Bowie—object to the bill's proposed citizens' assembly—arguing that it would "bind" Ministers to follow an "unelected and unaccountable" body's recommendations, which they see as "undemocratic". However, not all Conservatives are opposed to such assemblies. Former Secretary of State for Business, Alok Sharma, welcomed Climate Assembly UK's work as representing "the very best of civil society", and showing "the benefits of working with a dedicated group that's been given time and information to consider complex issues in full".

Opposing the bill in 2025, the National Federation of Builders said that, despite its "noble cause", the bill is likely to have "negative, unintended consequences that may cause more harm than they solve".

Right wing commentators via GB News, Daily Sceptic, and Spectator opposed the bill ahead of its second reading, though assertions that its enactment would "decimate the UK economy" lack detailed substantiation.

Some (former) members of Reform UK and the Heritage Party voiced their opposition on social media, urging MPs to reject the bill due to perceived "threats" to jobs, property rights, and economic stability. Such skepticism to the bill was largely anecdotal, and is not representative of broader public opinion. The Countryside Alliance, which opposed the bill, noted that many of these "attacks" were misinformed and "ill-founded", and stated that—though the Alliance supports decarbonisation and nature restoration—plans for achieving those aims "must be both viable and capable of maintaining public support, particularly from rural communities, [and that the bill] is neither".

=== Conservative party ===
At the bill's second reading on 24 January, the Shadow Minister—Andrew Bowie—said that the Conservative Party could not support the bill as it "misunderstands" energy markets and governance, and may "damage" Britain's prosperity and security. Bowie also commented that "whilst respecting those supporting it, [the] bill is deeply flawed, would leave Brits poorer, undermine our democratic process, and damage our energy security".

The Conservative Environment Network director, Sam Hall, said that, whilst "respecting" the aspirations of the bill to accelerate environmental action, "the [Labour] Government should focus on meeting existing Conservative-enacted targets".

== See also ==
- Climate change in the United Kingdom
- Private members' bills in the UK Parliament
- Climate Change Act 2008
- Paris Agreement 2015
- Environment Act 2021
- Kunming-Montreal Global Biodiversity Framework 2022
- UK Climate Assembly
