= Environment Act 2021 =

Act of the Parliament of the United Kingdom

Environment Act 2021 (Note: Section 149.)
- Act of Parliament
- Parliament of the United Kingdom
- Long title: An Act to make provision about targets, plans and policies for improving the natural environment; for statements and reports about environmental protection; for the Office for Environmental Protection; about waste and resource efficiency; about air quality; for the recall of products that fail to meet environmental standards; about water; about nature and biodiversity; for conservation covenants; about the regulation of chemicals; and for connected purposes.
- Citation: 2021 c. 30
- Introduced by: George Eustice, Secretary of State for Environment, Food and Rural Affairs (Commons); Lord Goldsmith of Richmond Park, Minister of State for the Pacific and the International Environment (Lords)
- Territorial extent: England and Wales; Scotland (in part); Northern Ireland (in part); (Note: Section 146.)

Dates
- Royal assent: 9 November 2021
- Commencement: Various (Note: Section 145.)
Other legislation
| Amends | House of Commons Disqualification Act 1975; Town and Country Planning Act 1990; Water Industry Act 1991; Water Resources Act 1991; Land Drainage Act 1991; Government of Wales Act 2006 |
| Amended by | Criminal Justice Act 2003 (Commencement No. 33) and Sentencing Act 2020 (Commencement No. 2) Regulations 2022; Retained EU Law (Revocation and Reform) Act 2023; Environment (Air Quality and Soundscapes) (Wales) Act 2024 |

Status: Amended

History of passage through Parliament

Text of statute as originally enacted

Revised text of statute as amended

The Environment Act 2021 (c. 30) is an act of the Parliament of the United Kingdom to improve air and water quality, protect wildlife, increase recycling and reduce plastic waste. The act is part of a new legal framework for environmental protection, given the UK no longer comes under EU law post-Brexit.

Friends of the Earth said the act represented a reduction in protections, rather than an increase. In January 2021 the bill was "severely delayed" for a third time, and in March it was announced that it would be delayed for at least another six months, but in November 2021 it completed all its stages and received Royal assent.

== Provisions ==
The act includes powers to prevent the export of plastic waste to developing countries, to put binding targets on air and water quality and to promote wildlife conservation. It also provides for a new Office for Environmental Protection (OEP) watchdog and created a framework for legally binding targets, such as to reduce particulate pollution. It gave people a greater say in the management of local street trees and enshrined in law biodiversity offsetting. The act also included new rules intended to stop the import of wood, soy, palm oil, beef, leather and other key commodities from areas of illegally deforested land.

Most of the act applies to England and Wales only. Some sections, such as on waste management, apply to Northern Ireland only. Provisions on waste including producer responsibility, resource efficiency and exporting waste apply to the whole of the United Kingdom. Aspects regarding the environmental recall of motor vehicles and the regulation of chemicals also apply to the whole country.

This bill, as well as the updated agriculture bill, and fisheries bill was planned to form a new legal framework for environmental protections post-Brexit. Such obligations had, for the previous forty years, been defined largely by the EEC and the EU, but post-Brexit divergence from the requirements of EU legislation was possible.

== Criticism ==
Of the bill as it stood in January 2021, Friends of the Earth said it represented a reduction in protections, rather than an increase; that the proposed environment watchdog will lack teeth and instead needs full independence and enforcement powers; and called for the inclusion of legally binding targets on plastic pollution, and tougher restrictions on single-use plastics. "Campaigners and many businesses want to see legally binding short-term targets introduced", rather than only long-term targets; World Wide Fund for Nature want a legally binding target date of 2023 by when UK supply chains will be deforestation free; the National Trust want a January 2021 government "proposal to protect 30% of the UK's land for nature by 2030" enshrined in law in the bill.

On the proposal to ban plastic exports to developing countries, the Green Alliance said the UK already has that power, and an obligation to use it under the Basel Convention, an international treaty to prevent transfer of hazardous waste from developed to less developed countries.

== Passage ==
The Environment Bill was announced in July 2018 and abandoned during the parliamentary wrangles over Brexit. It received its first reading on 30 January 2020, its second reading on 26 February, and reached committee stage on 10 March. In January 2021 it was "severely delayed" for a third time.

== See also ==
- Climate and Nature Bill
- Climate change in the United Kingdom
- Climate crisis
- Environmental impact of fashion
- Environmental impact of meat production
- Local Nature Recovery Strategy
- Social and environmental impact of palm oil
