= Rebecca Willis =

British academic and environmental scientist

- Born: 20 February 1972 (age 54)
- Known for: Environment and sustainability practice, policy and politics
- Board member of: Green Alliance (director, 2001–2004); Sustainable Development Commission (vice-chair, 2004–2011)
- Children: 2

Academic background
- Education: King's College, Cambridge; University of Sussex
- Alma mater: Lancaster University
- Thesis: How do politicians understand and respond to climate change? (2018)
- Doctoral advisor: John Urry, Nigel Clark and Vicky Singleton

Academic work
- Institutions: Lancaster University (2019–)
- Main interests: Climate and energy
- Notable works: Too Hot to Handle? The Democratic Challenge of Climate Change (2020)

Rebecca Willis (born 20 February 1972) is a British consultant and academic, who holds a professorship in energy and climate governance at the University of Lancaster. Her advisory work has addressed the intersection of environment, especially climate change and energy, with politics and public policy. Her research concerns environmental and sustainability policy.

== Biography ==
Willis graduated with a BA in social and policy sciences from King's College, Cambridge in 1994 and took a master's degree in environment, development and policy at the University of Sussex in 1996.

She spent a short time from 1997 to 1998 as a policy advisor at the European Parliament in Brussels.

She then became Head of Policy for the Green Alliance charity and directed the organisation from 2001 to 2004. She continues to be associated with the charity. In 2009, she introduced its Climate Change Leadership Programme for UK members of parliament.

From 2004 until it was closed in 2011, Willis was vice-chair of the Sustainable Development Commission, an advisory body to the UK governments.

She also undertook independent consulting from 2004 until 2017. This included advising the Lake District National Park on setting up a local low carbon budget and also the British Academy and Co-operatives UK on models for community ownership of energy. She was a non-academic member of the council of the UK government's Natural Environment Research Council from August 2011 until 2015.

From 2014, Willis has been associated with the University of Lancaster, where she was awarded a doctoral degree by publication in sociology in 2018 and appointed professor of practice in 2019.

She has been one of the expert leads for the UK Climate Assembly that began in 2019. Her role is to help this citizens' assembly stay focused, accurate and balanced when recommending how the UK can achieve net zero carbon emissions by 2050, in line with the Climate Change Act. In partial response to the COVID-19 pandemic, the assembly's final report supported economic recovery measures that reduced greenhouse gases and encouraged green changes to lifestyles.

In 2020, Willis was awarded a UK Research and Innovation Future Leaders Fellowship. She took up the chair in energy and climate governance at Lancaster University in 2021.

== Publications ==
Willis has authored and co-authored books, scientific publications and reports.

=== Books ===
- Too Hot to Handle? The Democratic Challenge of Climate Change, Bristol: Bristol University Press, 2020, ISBN 9781529206029
- Bringing Governance Back Home: Lessons for Local Government Regarding Rapid Climate Action (ed., with David Tyfield and Andy Yuille), Basel: MDPI, 2022, ISBN 9783036542676

=== Selected journal articles ===
- "How Members of Parliament Understand and Respond to Climate Change", The Sociological Review, 66.3 (2018), pp. 475–491
- "The Role of National Politicians in Global Climate Governance", Environment and Planning E: Nature and Space, 3.3 (2020), pp. 885–903
- "Social tipping intervention strategies for rapid decarbonization need to consider how change happens" (with Steven R. Smith and Ian Christie), Proceedings of the National Academy of Sciences of the United States of America, 117.20 (2020), pp. 10629–10630

=== Reports and pamphlets ===
- Precaution in Practice: How the Precautionary Principle Is Used by Government, Business and NGOs (with Jennie Oldham), London: Green Alliance, 2002, ISBN 0953016064
- See-through Science: Why Public Engagement Needs to Move Upstream (with James Wilsdon), London: Demos, 2004, ISBN 1841801305
- Grid 2.0: The Next Generation, London: Green Alliance, 2006, ISBN 0954975774
- A Green Living Initiative: Engaging Households to Achieve Environmental Goals (with Simon Dresner and Paul Ekins), London: Policy Studies Institute, 2006, ISBN 0954975758
- Dear Gordon: Open Letters on Green Goals for Your Government (ed., with Faye Scott), London: Green Alliance, 2007, ISBN 9781905869046
- Demanding Less: Why We Need a New Politics of Energy (with Nick Eyre), London: Green Alliance, 2011, ISBN 9781905869510
- Unlocking Local Leadership on Climate Change: Perspectives from Coalition MPs (ed., with Hannah Kyrke-Smith and Faye Scott), London: Green Alliance, 2012, ISBN 9781905869640
- Paris 2015: Getting a Global Agreement on Climate Change (a report by Christian Aid, Green Alliance, Greenpeace, RSPB, and WWF), London: Green Alliance, 2014, ISBN 9781909980181
- A New Agenda for City Transport (with Costanza Poggi), London: Green Alliance, 2017, ISBN 9781909980846

== Awards ==
In November 2020 she was included in the BBC Radio 4 Woman's Hour Power list 2020.

== Personal life ==
Willis is divorced and has two sons.
