= UK Climate Assembly =

Citizens' assembly, established in 2020

The UK Climate Assembly is a citizens' group formed in the United Kingdom in January 2020 whose goal was to issue recommendations for how the UK could satisfy its climate change law—the Climate Change Act amendment passed on 27 June 2019 mandates that the country must reach net-zero carbon emissions by 2050. It was formed of 108 UK citizens, chosen to be representative of the population. Its last meeting was delayed to May due to the COVID-19 pandemic and the group's report was published in September 2020.

== Establishment ==
A group of 108 UK citizens, chosen to be representative of the UK population, were determined from randomly sampling the population. Invitations to enter a pool of 1,500 people for selection were sent to 30,000 people. Some places were reserved for people from more deprived postcodes, to combat an expected response rate bias. Participants were chosen with a view to be representative of demographics including age, gender, education, ethnicity, location and attitude towards climate change. Chris Stark, Jim Watson, Rebecca Willis and Lorraine Whitmarsh were the four Expert Leads for this assembly. The group was the second citizen's group formed by the UK government, following a smaller citizen's group on social care in 2018.

Unlike the French Citizens convention for ecological transition which is called for by the French government, the assembly was organised by MPs on six parliamentary select committees. It was funded by the UK parliament and by the European Climate Foundation and Esmée Fairbairn Foundation.

== Activities ==
The work of the convention was originally planned to be held in person over four weekends. The last weekend was moved online and split over three weekends due to the COVID-19 pandemic causing lockdown restrictions in the UK. Discussion took place over the internet, with printed resources sent in the post and the option to join via landline. It ran from January 2020 to May 2020.

The group were first given talks by expert speakers on the subject of climate change. There were 47 speakers, including representatives from the Confederation of British Industry, Trades Union Congress, National Farmers' Union, environmental NGOs and renewable energy companies.

== Outcome ==
=== First principles ===
In the first weekend, the citizen chose their priorities. Aims included "informing and educating everyone" and making greener products and services affordable and accessible to all. They wanted a "clear, proactive, accountable and consistent" government leadership. Other priorities include natural world protection, engaging local communities and acting with "urgency". The group wanted cross-party consensus, as the changes are to be implemented in the next decades by different governments

=== Green Covid-19 recovery plan ===
80% of the assembly members voted that government's coronavirus economic recovery measures should be designed to also help the country to meet its target of carbon emissions reduction until reaching net zero in 2050.

=== Final report ===
The assembly published its final report of 556 pages in September 2020. It recommended changes in all economics sectors. It encouraged meat-and-dairy consumption reduction, switching to zero-carbon heating and generation of clean electricity.

Proposed measures include a levy for frequent fliers, a ban on the sale of petrol, diesel and hybrid cars by 2030-35 and a switch to a more biodiversity-focused farming system. They preferred "natural" carbon removal efforts, such as restoring forests, peatlands and other natural habitats to technical solutions, such as carbon capture and storage. Each measure is listed with the level of support received in the assembly and the advantages and disadvantages seen by the assembly.

== Reception ==
Chief executive Chris Stark declared that the Committee on Climate Change will consider the group's recommendations.

The MPs that originated the assembly requested the prime minister to respond to the report before the end of 2020.

Craig Bennett, of Friends of the Earth, told the Financial Times that the assembly "could play an important role" but should not "delay things further".

== Impact ==
In July 2021, the Business, Energy and Industrial Strategy Committee published a report on the progress of the group's suggestions which stated "We are disappointed that the Minister has rowed back on the commitment given to us in oral evidence that the Government would provide a comprehensive and point-by-point response to the recommendations in CAUK’s ambitious report."

In November 2021 the Westminster Foundation for Democracy stated that while the UK Climate Assembly had been considered a success by select committees, its impact had been limited and it "has had an agenda-setting influence at best."

== See also ==
- Climate and Ecological Emergency Bill
- Global Assembly
