= Local Nature Recovery Strategy =

Environmental policy in the United Kingdom

Local Nature Recovery Strategies show how and where nature recovery can be best supported across the strategy's area. They were introduced to provide a spatial, locally coordinated framework for nature recovery, addressing long-standing criticism that conservation efforts in England were fragmented and insufficiently aligned with land-use planning. They were established under the Environment Act 2021, and involve mapping the habitats, agreeing priorities for their recovery, and mapping specific proposals for helping them recover. They focus on local needs and priorities, established through workshops, surveys and consultation. Their development involves working with partner organisations and stakeholders. For example in Cumbria these include Natural England, Lake District National Park Authority and Yorkshire Dales National Park Authority. The work is done using guidance from DEFRA. In the scheme's early stages, it was criticised for lack of attention to quantitative auditing of progress, including any use of rich existing data on local species diversity. There were also concerns about funding.

Examples include Cumbria, Northumberland, Lancashire, and Durham. Eventually there will be 48 of them, with variations between them in the ways they are established and operated within the guidelines.

== See also ==
- Habitat Conservation Plan
- Habitat destruction
- Habitat fragmentation
- Habitat conservation
- List of species and habitats of principal importance in England
