= Green Alliance (think tank) =

British environmental charity and think tank

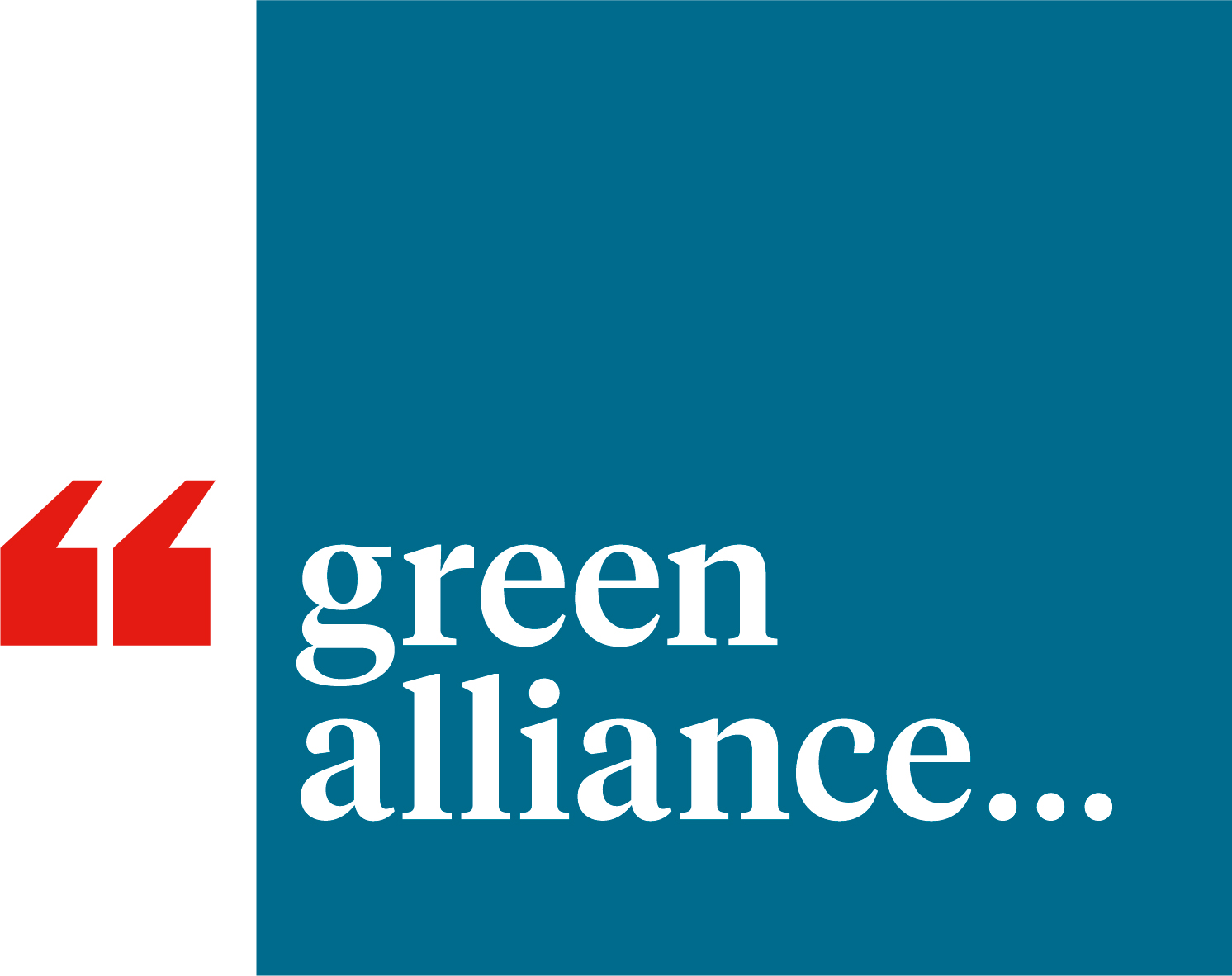
- Founded: 1979; 47 years ago
- Type: Charitable trust
- Purpose: Environmental policy
- Location: London, United Kingdom
- Website: green-alliance.org.uk

Green Alliance is a charity and independent think tank based in central London, United Kingdom (UK).

It researches and recommends new environmental policy proposals, and works strategically, in alliance with other non-governmental organisations (NGOs) and businesses, on promoting greater political support for the environment.

The organisation conducts analysis on a range of policy themes: ‘natural environment’, ‘low carbon future’, ‘greening the economy’ and ‘resources’. Its ‘political leadership’ theme focuses on raising the ambition and commitment of politicians to act on climate and nature, highlighting the social and economic advantages of doing so.

Many of Green Alliance's projects involve collaboration with partners, in businesses, academia and other NGOs. For instance, it has run a Circular Economy Task Force of businesses to advocate better resource management since 2013, and it leads the Greener UK NGO coalition, which has worked on UK post-Brexit environmental governance since 2016.

Green Alliance hosts a blog and a podcast giving voice to organisations, opinion formers, experts and commentators on environmental issues. It holds regular events, including hosting major speeches by senior ministers and political leaders, such as Tony Blair, Caroline Lucas, David Cameron, Al Gore, Nicola Sturgeon, Alok Sharma and Kwasi Kwarteng.

== People ==
Notable individuals involved in Green Alliance's early years include Maurice Ash, Tim Beaumont, Tom Burke, Julie Hill and Rebecca Willis. Shaun Spiers has been executive director since 2017.

Since the early 1990s, Green Alliance has regularly convened a strategic alliance of the chief executives of UK's foremost environmental NGOs, leading joint advocacy on major national policy issues.

Many senior British environmentalists and environmental professionals are members and supporters of Green Alliance, listed in the organisation’s annual report.

== History ==
Green Alliance was launched in March 1979 to inject an 'ecological perspective into the political life of Britain'. One of the founders, Maurice Ash, said at the launch "We’re a bunch of optimists. We’re not the doomsters. We believe in the possibilities of the future...” The initial ‘alliance’ was a cross party, cross sectoral group of senior figures, including peers, judges, organisational leaders and academics. Green Alliance has since focused on influencing the ambitions of UK government environment policy using a collaborative approach.

In the 1980s, it elicited the first ever environmental policy statements from all the main UK political parties. It was the first organisation in the UK to raise genetic modification (GM) as an environmental issue at the end of the 80s, with a risk analysis which informed government regulation.

In 1998, it hosted the UK Green Globe Network of foreign policy experts, supported by cross-cutting funding from three government departments: the Foreign and Commonwealth Office, Department for International Development and the then Department of the Environment.

A number of new organisations and initiatives have arisen from Green Alliance's work, including the National Food Alliance (now Sustain), the Environment Agency, the Carbon Trust, the UK's Renewables Obligation and the Greener UK coalition.

In 2015, Green Alliance brought Prime Minister David Cameron, Deputy Prime Minister Nick Clegg and the Leader of the Opposition, Ed Miliband together in a cross party agreement to tackle climate change. It sought a climate change deal at the Paris climate summit which limited temperature rises to below 2 °C, set carbon budgets according to the Climate Change Act and aimed to accelerate the UK’s transition to an energy efficient and low carbon economy. The agreement was widely welcomed, marking a milestone for the UK ahead of the climate summit. In November 2015, the government announced it would phase out unabated coal fired power and, in November 2016, the UK signed the Paris climate change agreement.

Green Alliance founded Greener UK in 2016, after the EU referendum decision. It is a coalition of 12 major UK environmental organisations, supported by over 50 smaller organisations. Its purpose was to ensure that environmental protections were maintained and enhanced during the Brexit process, particularly through domestic legislation. After the UK left the EU, the coalition continued to build on existing environmental standards and protections through its successful campaign for a new Environment Act and a focus on new trade agreements.

== Recognition ==
An independent evaluation of Green Alliance in 2008 said: “Green Alliance’s key strengths are its influence within Westminster and Whitehall and its understanding of the political process. Green Alliance’s relationships with politicians, special advisers and civil servants are its primary strength. It is considered influential within government. Those in government value the ability of Green Alliance to bring them policy positions and mediate relations with NGOs.”

In 2009, Green Alliance was awarded Think Tank of the Year at the Public Affairs News Awards.

Green Alliance’s report The future savings challenge was highly commended in the 2015 Farsight Awards.

Green Alliance was awarded 'Best environmental campaign by a non-governmental organisation' at the 2016 Green Ribbon Political Awards for securing the party leaders' climate agreement in February 2015.

Green Alliance was Highly Commended for NGO of the Year at the 2016 Business Green Leaders Awards, in recognition of brokering climate pledges from party leaders.

Green Alliance’s leadership of the Greener UK coalition was awarded Highly Commended at the 2019 Charity Awards.

Commenting on the work of Greener UK, steered by Green Alliance since 2016, the book Environmental groups and legal expertise: shaping the Brexit process, by Professor Carolyn Abbot and Professor Maria Lee (published in 2021 by UCL Press) said that “Greener UK has been a crucially important actor in the environmental NGO sector’s response to Brexit-environment. Our interviewees expressed almost unanimous, and in most cases unconditional, support for the work that Greener UK has done in shaping the post-Brexit environmental law landscape.”

== See also ==
- List of UK think tanks
