= Artists Union (disambiguation) =

The Artists Union was a union of artists in New York City during the Great Depression.

Artists Union or Artists' Union may also refer to:

- Artists' Union of the USSR
- Artists' Union England, a trade union in the United Kingdom
- Scottish Artists Union
- Union of Artists of Azerbaijan

== See also ==
- American Artists' Congress
- Association of Artists of Revolutionary Russia
- Creative unions in the Soviet Union
- Estonian Artists' Association
- Lithuanian Artists' Association
- Société de la Propriété Artistique et des Dessins et Modèles, France
