= 1.5-degree target =

Climate goal limiting greenhouse effect

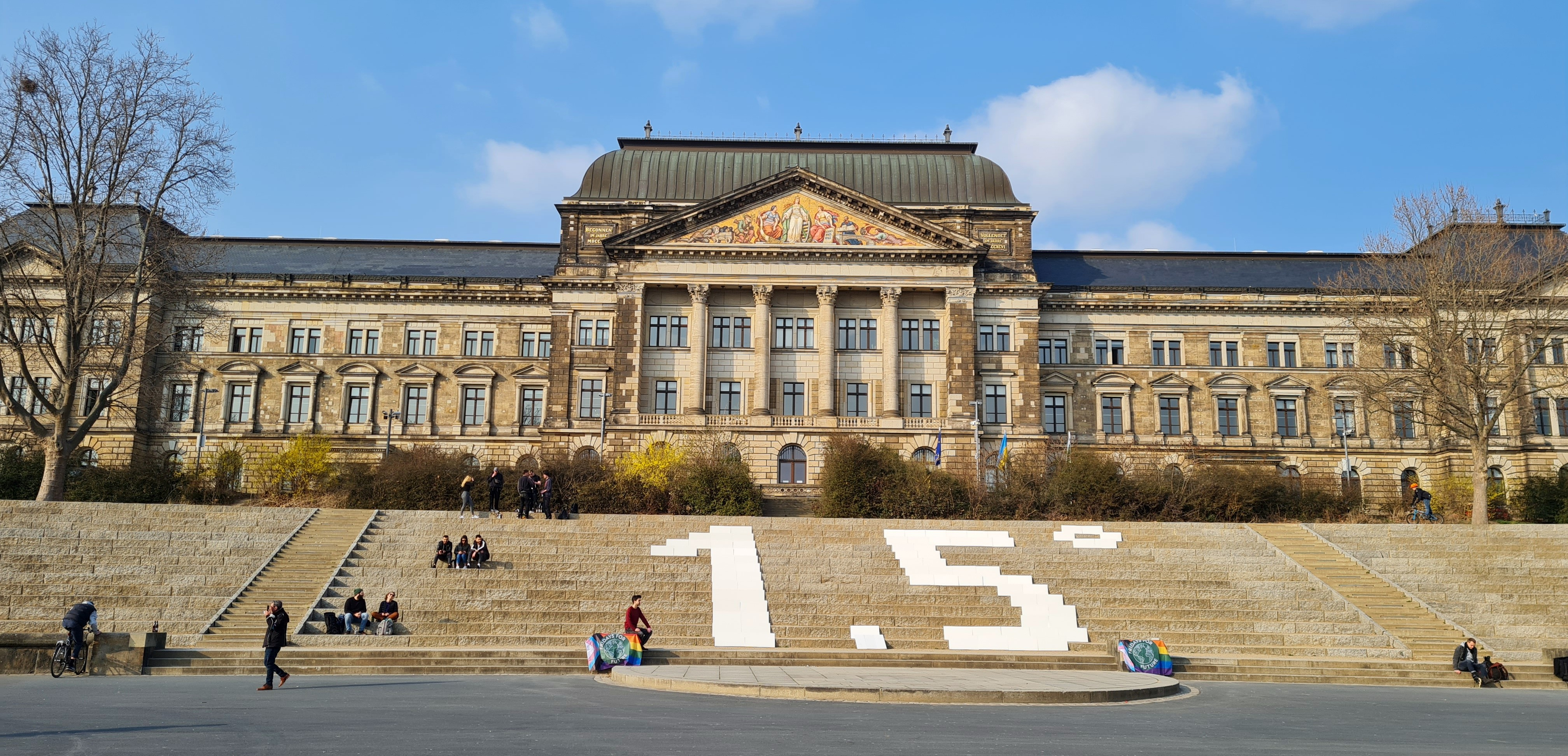
Fridays for Future lettering "1.5°" on the banks of the Elbe in Dresden's Neustadt district, to call for compliance with the 1.5 °C target (2022)

The 1.5-degree target (also known as the 1.5-degree limit) is the climate goal of limiting the man-made global temperature increase caused by the greenhouse effect to 1.5 °C (2,7 °F) on a 20-year average, calculated from the beginning of industrialization to the year 2100. The average value for the years 1850 to 1900 is used as the pre-industrial value.

In September 2026, UNEP published a report asserting that, due to emissions not being lowered, keeping warming to 1.5°C is not possible without some degree of temporary temperature overshoot (referred to as overshoot). The extent of this overshoot – how high temperatures rise and for how long – depends on actions taken now to reduce emissions. Even if global temperatures return to 1.5°C, a slight temporary increase beyond this threshold can have large-scale, irreversible impacts, including extinction as species are pushed beyond their thermal tolerance limits and sea-level rise.

Most modelled projections suggest that overshoot will need to be limited to 1.8°C to have a reasonable chance of returning to 1.5°C by the end of the century, which risks a permanent breach of the 1.5°C temperature goal. At the same time, limiting overshoot to below 1.7°C is no longer assessed as feasible. Pathways that allow warming to return to 1.5°C require a rapid and immediate phase-out of fossil fuels. In addition, some level of carbon dioxide removal will be needed. However, approaches remain expensive and unproven at the proposed scales, reiterating the need to prioritise deep, rapid emission cuts now.

== Background ==
At the 21st UN Climate Change Conference in 2015 (COP 21), almost all countries in the world signed a treaty in the Paris Agreement, according to which they intend to make efforts to achieve the 1.5-degree target. According to the Special Report on Global Warming of 1.5 °C by the Intergovernmental Panel on Climate Change (IPCC), meeting the 1.5-degree target would be significantly more favorable than if only the two-degree target could be achieved. However, according to the IPCC, the efforts made before 2023 to reduce greenhouse gas emissions are far from sufficient. Without an immediate increase in measures, the world could warm by around 3.2 °C over the next 70 years, with catastrophic consequences for people and the environment.

The World Meteorological Organization (WMO) predicted that the 1.5-degree temperature threshold would be exceeded in at least one year between 2023 and 2027. Accordingly, 2024 was the first single calendar year above 1.5 °C relative to pre-industrial levels. A study published in 2025 shows that such a first year above 1.5 °C indicates that most probably Earth has already entered the 20-year period that will reach the Paris Agreement limit — that is, a 20-year period with average warming of 1.5 °C. According to the United Nations Environment Programme (UNEP), the international community is heading towards dangerous global warming of up to 2.9 °C if it fully implements its current climate protection commitments, which are not dependent on preconditions.

== Achievability ==
In a 2017 study, the chances of achieving the 1.5-degree target were rated as low. At that time, it was assumed that even without further greenhouse gas emissions, the global average temperature would still rise to at least 1.1 °C compared to pre-industrial times, and with a probability of 13% even to 1.5 °C or more. A second study from the same year considers it unlikely that global warming will even be limited to 2 °C by 2100, let alone 1.5 °C. According to models at the time, which relied on predictions about gross domestic product per capita and population development, among other things, the probability of achieving this target was estimated at just one percent.

However, the IPCC's 1.5-degree global warming special report published in October 2018 concludes that the 1.5-degree target is still achievable. To achieve this, human CO_{2} emissions would have to start falling significantly long before 2030 and reach net zero emissions from around 2050. In order to reduce greenhouse gas emissions in this relatively short period of time, a shift away from fossil fuels towards renewable energy sources and a predominantly plant-based diet is needed. Simultaneously, carbon dioxide removal of up to 100 to 1000 billion tons CO_{2} are required until the end of the century, equaling 2.5 to 25 times of the yearly CO_{2} emissions of c. 40 gigatons. One option to achieve this through natural means would be through carbon dioxide removal measures (CDR) in context of agriculture, forestry and other land use (AFOLU) like afforestation and moorland restoration, however in most modeled emission pathways of the IPCC this is considered insufficient. Additionally, carbon capture and storage would have to be used to cool down the Earth after exceeding the 1.5-degree target. The world climate council itself mentions that it isn't confirmed that such measurements would work in large scale application.

One prognosis published in 2023 certified that the 1.5-degree target would collapse between 2033 and 2035 even in positive scenarios. One report from the same year considers the compliance of the 1.5-degree goal and the decarbonization to 2050 as "not plausible".

One case study on London published in 2023 suggests that the biggest contribution to reaching the 1.5-degree target in major cities consists of a drastic reduction in private transport. The scientists recommend a mix of measures in form of neighborly carsharing, the restructuring of the street layout after a superblock model, comprehensive local supply based on a compact city model, the stop of big road construction projects as well as a dynamic toll for roads with considerably higher traffic jam or areas of high hazardous effect on health.

The worldwide planned production volume of coal, oil and gas continuously exceeds the permissible dimensions needed for mitigation of the climate change. On basis of the undisputed correlation between CO_{2} emissions and the economic growth, growth-critical measurements in order to reduce the rate of economical growth are considered central to the adherence to the 1.5-degree and 2-degree targets. According to research by Jason Hickel for example, the growth targets of the International Monetary Fund (IMF) would be opposing to these goals.

Recent works indicate that the achievability of the 1.5-degree target through the retroactive withdrawal of CO_{2} emissions from the Earth's atmosphere (overshoot scenario) had been overestimated within climate research because of irreversible effects. According to a survey by The Guardian only 5 percent of the surveyed climate scientists at the beginning of 2024 expected the achievability of the 1.5-degree target.

== Advantages compared to the 2-degree target ==
The IPCC's special report makes among other things the following central statements to the consequences of a global warming of 1.5 °C in comparison to one of 2 °C:

1. A reduced increase to average temperatures, heat waves, droughts, heavy precipitation and precipitation deficits.
2. The rise of the sea level would be reduced by 0.1 more meters by adhering to the 1.5-degree target instead of the 2-degree target. Based on the population counts of 2010 and without any adjustment measures 10 million fewer people would be affected by the rise of the sea level than by 2 °C of warming. The oceans will rise regardless, even when adhering to the 1.5-degree target, although with less speed than with a warming of 2 °C.
3. There would be less extinction of species, less damage on ecosystems on land, in fresh water and coasts so that more of the services of the ecosystems are retained longer.
4. A lower increase in ocean warming and acidification, along with a smaller decline in ocean oxygen levels, and a reduced loss of biodiversity and fishery yields. A summer without sea ice in the Arctic would statistically occur only once per century instead of once per decade.
5. There would be lower risks to human health and safety, livelihoods, food and water supplies, and economic growth.
6. Fewer adjustments to the new climate would be necessary. The limits of the adaptation capacity of some human and natural systems are reached with 1.5 degrees of global warming, but the losses due to exceeding the limits of climate change adaptation would be smaller than with 2 degrees of global warming.

The risk of triggering tipping points in the Earth's climate system and uncontrollable chain reactions is significantly lower at 1.5 °C of warming. Tipping points in the cryosphere, according to a group of researchers in a 2019 commentary, could already be dangerously close. With warming of 1.5 °C to 2 °C, the Greenland ice sheet or Arctic sea ice could melt. The tipping point for the West Antarctic ice sheet may already have been surpassed, but warming of 1.5 °C would slow the melting process by a factor of ten compared to 2 °C of global warming, making it easier to adapt to a sharply rising sea level. However, the carbon budget of 500 billion tons for a 50 percent chance of reaching the 1.5-degree target may already have been used up.

Compared to the current global warming projections by the Intergovernmental Panel on Climate Change (IPCC), achieving the 1.5-degree target could force 80 percent fewer people to migrate due to climate change, as fewer areas of the Earth would become uninhabitable. According to CAN Europe, aligning Europe with the 1.5-degree target could save one trillion euros by 2030.

== Assessment in the climate protection movement ==
Due to the low confidence of the IPCC and climate researchers regarding the achievability of the target, various groups, such as Scientist Rebellion, argue that the 1.5-degree target should be declared politically unfeasible. Direct democratic initiatives, such as Climate Restart, the initiator of the 2023 Berlin climate neutrality referendum, emphasize that decarbonization in industrialized nations must still be implemented in line with the 1.5-degree target to mitigate risks.

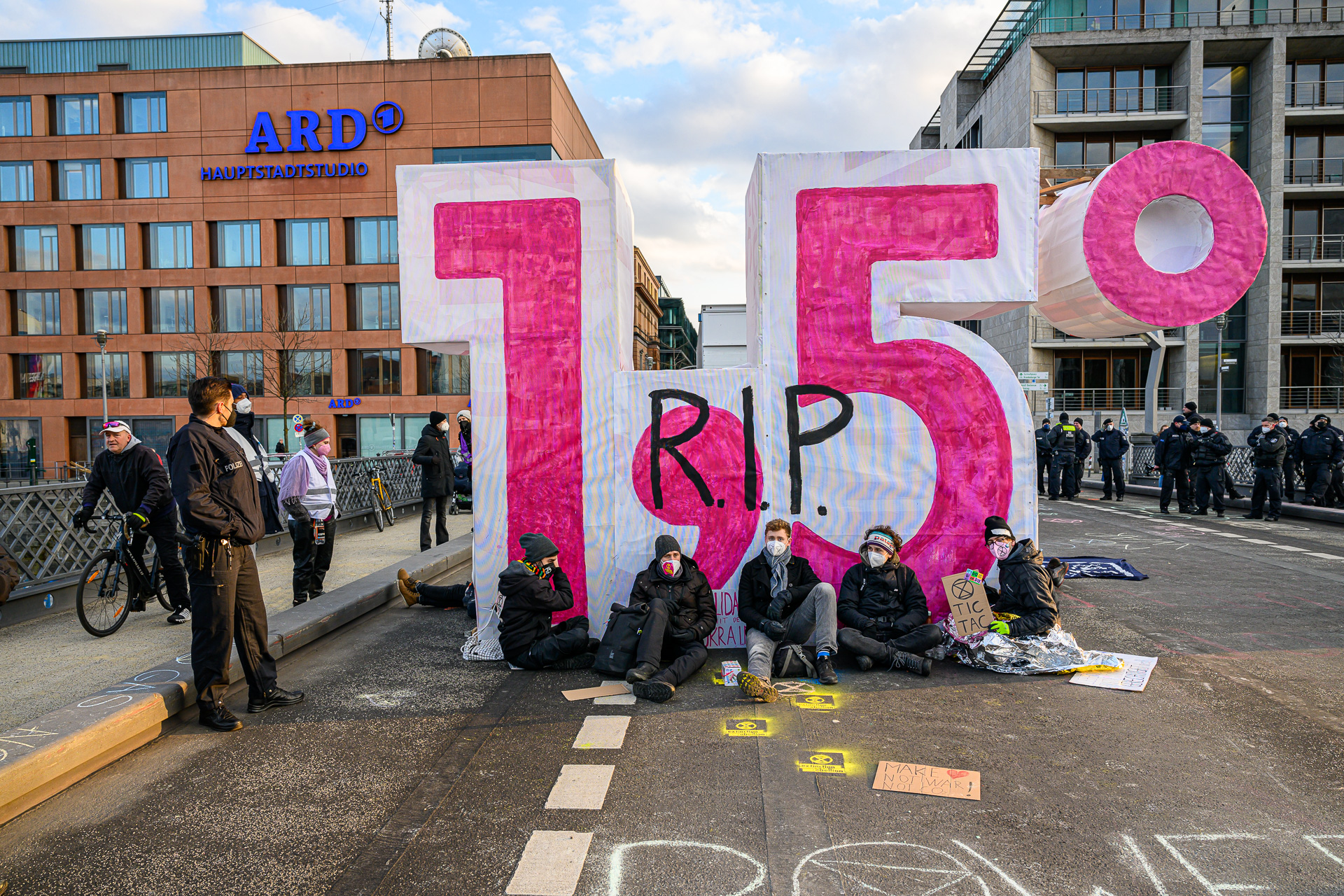
Activists from Extinction Rebellion point to the imminent failure to meet the target. ("1,5 ° R.I.P.") (2022)

Political scientists Wim Carton and Andreas Malm (both from Lund University) criticize representatives of climate science for having based their simulations on the achievability of the 1.5-degree target for too long, while relying on implausible assumptions that distracted from real-world scenarios.

== Use as a slogan ==
The words "1.5 degrees" or "1.5°C" are often used as slogans by activists, such as by Fridays for Future since July 2022, with the inscription "We all for 1.5°C" on the asphalt of Hamburg's Mönckebergstraße, or during the occupation of Lützerath starting in 2022 ("1.5°C means: Lützerath stays!").
