= Early day motion =

Motion in Westminster system parliaments

In the Westminster parliamentary system, an early day motion (EDM) is a motion, expressed as a single sentence, tabled by a member of Parliament, which the Government (in charge of parliamentary business) has not yet scheduled for debate.

== History and uses ==
The name derives from the idea that an MP who tables one is calling for a debate on the topic covered by the motion to be held "on an early day". In practice, early day motions are rarely debated in the House, and their main purpose is to draw attention to particular subjects of interest. Government ministers, whips, parliamentary private secretaries, the Speaker of the House of Commons and deputy speakers do not normally sign EDMs. EDMs remain open for signature for the duration of the parliamentary session.

EDMs can be tabled on matters ranging from trivial or humorous topics to those of great importance. The censure motion by which the Labour Government of James Callaghan was ejected had its origin in an early day motion (no. 351 of 1978–79), put down on 22 March 1979, by Margaret Thatcher.

MPs may ensure the text of an EDM is printed in Hansard by mentioning it by number in questions to the Leader of the House of Commons after the Business Statement (normally on a Thursday when the house is in session).

EDMs tabled on serious topics have included one demanding the release of Nelson Mandela when he was incarcerated in apartheid South Africa, and one calling for a consultation on the fingerprinting of children in schools without parental permission. Shortly after the 2005 general election, 412 of the 646 MPs signed EDM 178 calling for a Climate Change Bill; only three other early day motions had ever been signed by more than 400 MPs.

In the 2021–2022 parliamentary session, an early day motion which expressed support for WAVE Trust's 70/30 campaign to reduce child maltreatment by 70% by 2030 achieved the support of 151 Members of Parliament and, in doing so, became the most supported EDM of that particular session.

== Criticism ==
Robert Courts, Conservative MP between 2016 and 2024, has been an outspoken critic of EDMs, describing them as "parliamentary graffiti." Courts has said that EDMs are generally tabled by MPs on behalf of "lobbyists or groups keen to show themselves as doing something", that they are "politically impotent" and a waste of taxpayers' money.

== See also ==
- Adjournment debate
