= Social Workers Union =

British trade union

SWU
- Social Workers Union
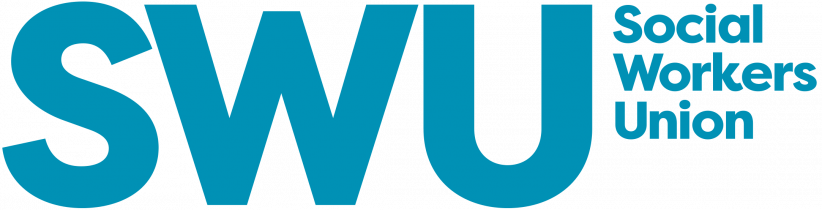
- Founded: June 21, 2011; 15 years ago
- Headquarters: Wellesley House, 37 Waterloo Street, Birmingham, B2 5PP
- Location: United Kingdom
- Members: ▼15,335 (2024)
- General Secretary: John McGowan
- Publication: SWU Newsletter
- Affiliations: GFTU; BASW
- Website: swu-union.org.uk

The Social Workers Union (SWU) is a registered trade union for social work professionals and an organisational member of The British Association of Social Workers (BASW). The SWU reports over 15,000 paid members July 2022. This union devoted to social workers was set up on 21 June 2011, triggered by research among BASW members that indicated it was difficult to work under tremendous pressure to deliver social services and to often be subjected to criticism in the media. and because SWU has a legal right for its A&R officers to attend and represent at disciplinary and grievance procedures unlike BASW, offering an extra layer of support for its members.

SWU uses officers who are also qualified social workers to advocate and negotiate on behalf of social workers, both individually and collectively within the trade union movement and with employers. The SWU offers representation from a qualified Social Worker – someone who understands the competing demands placed on the employee and the Code of Conducts governed by the four regulators of social work in the United Kingdom (Scotland, England, Wales and Northern Ireland).

== Difference between SWU and BASW ==
Membership of the SWU is a benefit for members of BASW. Despite this link, the SWU is an independent Trade Union. The SWU, unlike a professional association, can enforce the legal entitlement of representation in employers' hearings by SWU's Trade Union Officials. The SWU offers practical representation and works with BASW to offer advice and representation before regulatory bodies. This combined approach, it is claimed, "provides the best protection and best advice for social workers from social workers." SWU is a member of the General Federation of Trade Unions (GFTU), a group of 28 specialist unions with over 260,000 individual members. SWU members have access to the training provided by the GFTU [Source]. SWU campaigns with the GFTU and is represented on the GFTU's National Executive by the General Secretary (GS), currently John McGowan. SWU gained their certificate of independence from the UK Certification Officer for Trade Unions 18 October 2011.

== Formation and Leaders ==
The Social Workers Union was established on 21 June 2011. 'Pursuant to the resolution by BASW Council on 21 June 2011, it was resolved by BASW to establish a trade union which is to be called "The Social Workers Union" and to adopt rules for such trade union' (BASW AGM, 2011). There have been three General Secretary's since this time:

- Hilton Dawson: General Secretary – not elected but combined role of BASW Chief Executive Officer and SWU GS) 2011–2012
- Bridget Robb: General Secretary – not elected but combined role of BASW Chief Executive Officer and SWU GS) 2013 – 2016
- John McGowan: General Secretary – elected by the members until Sept 2021 as the first General Secretary independent of BASW employment 2016 – 2021
- John McGowan: General Secretary – re-elected July 2021 unopposed by the members 2021–present

== Annual Conference and AGMs ==
- 2012 – 1st ever Annual General Meeting: Novotel Hotel, Broad Street, Birmingham 3.30pm Thursday 14 June 2012. Meeting took place directly after the BASW Conference.
- 2013 – 2nd Annual General Meeting of the Social Workers Union held at the Riverside Centre, Derby on Thursday 27 June 2013 commencing. Meeting took place directly after the BASW Conference.
- 2014 – 3rd Annual General Meeting of the Social Workers Union held on Tuesday 10 June 2014 at LSO St Luke's, 161 Old Street, London. Meeting took place directly after the BASW Conference.
- 2015 – 4th Annual General Meeting of the Social Workers Union held on Wednesday 29 April 2015 at LSO St Luke's, 161 Old Street, London. Meeting took place directly after the BASW Conference.
- 2016 – 5th Annual General Meeting of the Social Workers Union held at the Quakers Friends House, 173–177 Euston Road, London NW1 2BJ on Friday 23 September 2016. Meeting took place directly after the BASW Conference.
- 2017 – SWU's first Conference and AGM separate from BASW 6th Annual General Meeting of the Social Workers Union held at the Queen Elizabeth ll Conference Centre, Broad Sanctuary, Westminster, London SW1P 3EE on Friday 22 September 2017.
- 2018 – SWU Conference and AGM 7th Annual General Meeting of the Social Workers Union held at The Studio 7 Cannon Street, Birmingham, B2 5EP on Friday 21 September 2018.
- 2019 – SWU Conference and AGM 8th Annual General Meeting of the Social Workers Union held at The Mechanics Centre, 103 Princess Street, Manchester, M1 6DD on Friday 27 September 2019
- 2020 – SWU AGM 9th Annual General Meeting of the Social Workers Union held online (due to COVID-19) Friday 25 September 2020.
- 2021 – SWU AGM 10th Annual General Meeting of the Social Workers Union held online (due to COVID-19) Friday 24 September 2021.
- 2022 – SWU AGM 11th Annual General Meeting of the Social Workers Union held online – Friday 23 September 2022.
- 2023 – SWU AGM 12th Annual General Meeting of the Social Workers Union held online – Friday 29 September 2023.

== Significant Campaigns ==
=== Boot out Austerity ===
The Boot out Austerity campaign, highlighted the impact of austerity on families. It saw 140 social workers and service users take part in a 100-mile walk from SWU's head office in Birmingham to the 2017 AGM venue in Liverpool, marching against austerity measures. The walk had significant impact and generated national and regional media interest, engaging with key government ministers and MPs. Since then, BASW and SWU have launched a Campaign Action Pack to encourage anti-austerity activity locally, regionally and nationally across the UK.

=== Working Conditions Campaign ===
BASW and SWU, in partnership with Bath Spa University are leading a campaign for improved working conditions for social workers. The latest research findings were launched in 2018. The campaign is ongoing and seeks to lobby Parliamentarians in Westminster, Holyrood and Cardiff Bay Parliaments. At a Westminster Parliamentary reception on 27 November 2018 over 20 MPs made a commitment at BASW/SWU's parliament event to pledge their support for social workers The aims of the campaign are to build awareness of the research which shows that social workers are strongly engaged in their work and want the very best outcomes for people that use services, but they are hampered by poor working conditions and a lack of resources.

=== Austerity Action Group ===
The Austerity Action Group consists of SWU representatives, BASW representatives, academics and social service users from among the general public. It is committed to opposing the programme of austerity implemented by Conservative governments in Britain. The Group promotes Social Justice and campaigns for those disadvantaged members of society, social workers, other allied professions and agencies adversely affected by the government's economic policies.

=== Sorry we Missed You ===
SWU advised on some aspects of the Ken Loach movie ‘Sorry we Missed You(2019)’ written by Paul Laverty and were given credits in the film. The SWU were part of the ongoing campaign and awareness-raising issues as part of the movie's release.

=== SWU Social Work's Six-Point Action Plan ===
363 social workers completed a new survey issued by the Social Workers Union to its members between 21 and 28 June 2020 which revealed the difficulties social workers faced during the COVID-19 lockdown. The research found that a third of social workers are now looking to leave the profession due to their experiences of lockdown. Thereafter SWU have promoted the 6 point Action Plan through the media and contact with UK Politicians and Social Work Local Authorities.

=== SWU 2022/23 Research and Action Plan on reflective supervision best practice ===
Social Workers Union and Bath Spa University begin new research and action plan on reflective supervision best practices: April 2021. Bath Spa University and SWU have collaborated on a new piece of research which seeks to develop and make available best practise supervision for social workers and related professionals. Over the next three to six months SWU will develop a comprehensive approach to best practise supervision by working closely with social workers from across the country as well as looking at the myriad of existing literature around reflective supervision.

=== SWU and Campaign Collective ===
The Social Workers Union (SWU) has partnered with Campaign Collective to help our members engage in activism and campaigning throughout 2022. The new SWU Campaign Fund supports our activist members by providing them with access to professional support for issues and causes they're passionate about, and is managed by Campaign Collective. SWU members can submit a campaign idea for funding by filling out the SWU Campaign Fund Application Form and returning it via email.

=== SWU Campaign Fund Updates ===
Social work neurodiversity task force meets (18 October 2023)

Social Workers Union calls on Labour to meet with students (5 October 2023, Morning Star article)

SWU Union Contacts examine campaign successes (3 October 2023)

Secure help to campaign to change the problems you see (19 September 2023)

Students in Scotland are still waiting on bursaries decision (11 September 2023)

Social worker students unable to live on inadequate bursaries (1 September 2023, Morning Star article)

"Warm words but no action" on English social work bursaries (31 August 2023)

SWU submits evidence to formal review of student bursaries in Scotland (3 August 2023)

Over 400 social work students write to ministers over bursary failures (27 July 2023)

Social work students honoured for activism (13 July 2023)

Social Workers Union calls for meeting with broadcast industry (6 July 2023)

Campaign Fund calls for bids from Wales – SWU and BASW Cymru Community of Practice (29 June 2023)

Review promised into social work student bursaries in Scotland (28 June 2023)

SWU event outlines how social workers can seek help from press regulator (20 June 2023)

Life on a social work student's income: 'I'd never buy myself something unless it was a necessity' (16 June 2023, Community Care article)

Labour urged to include social work in Manifesto plans (16 June 2023)

Campaign Fund calls for bids from Wales (9 June 2023)

Sluggish growth in part-time social work roles (9 June 2023)

A group of neurodivergent social workers is calling for fellow professionals to join them in adopting a new employers' pledge to celebrate neurodiversity in the profession (30 May 2023)

IPSO training event on 8 June is open to all – learn about the media complaints process for social workers, the rules the press must follow, and how IPSO can help social workers (30 May 2023)

Sign the open letter to support social work students across England calling for bursary reform (23 May 2023)

Event announced to help social workers understand media complaints process (16 May 2023)

SWU and BASW NI discuss future joint campaigns (4 May 2023)

Social Work Students urged to join England bursary campaign (4 May 2023)

Social workers urged to report negative media coverage to union (21 April 2023, Community Care article)

SWU and BASW call for bursary reform to be included in Labour manifesto (17 April 2023)

Reshuffle prompts social work students in Scotland to write to new ministers (13 April 2023)

Regulator's Readers' Panel discusses coverage of social workers (11 April 2023)

A cross-party committee of MSPs back social work bursaries petition (22 March 2023)

MSPs will debate a petition calling for bursaries for social work students on 22 March 2023 (16 March 2023)

Secretary of State questioned on England social work bursaries (10 March 2023)

Social work students in Scotland set for their day in Parliament (6 March 2023)

Student social workers discuss bursaries with Minister Jamie Hepburn (24 January 2023)

Social work students in England call for campaign fund support (17 January 2023)

11 campaigns launched by the SWU Campaign Fund and room for more! (16 January 2023)

Scottish Government Minister agrees to meet social work students to discuss bursaries (22 December 2022)

National Union of Journalists meets with SWU to discuss media guidelines (20 December 2022)

Petition launched after ministers snub social work students' call for fair treatment in Scotland (8 December 2022)

SWU Campaign Fund has renewed funding through 2022–2023 (29 November 2022)

SWU media guidelines take next step in gaining recognition from press (22 November 2022)

SWU webinar: Social workers help to set out stepping stones to better working conditions (21 November 2022)

SWU Campaign Fund supports social work students in Scotland to campaign on bursaries (7 November 2022)

Social Work Leaders Write to National Media (18 October 2022)

Guidelines on media reporting of social workers launched (22 September 2022)

Student led campaign increases financial support for social work students in Wales (29 July 2022)

SWU Campaign Fund 2021 – 2022 (5 July 2022)

Employers failing to advertise part-time social work roles, finds study (9 June 2022, Community Care article)

Social work employers urged to offer more part-time posts to address recruitment crisis (9 June 2022, PSW article)

7 Campaigns and room for more (19 April 2022)

1. FoodIsCare Survey: Rampant food insecurity hitting most vulnerable (15 February 2022)

Welsh Government pledges action on bursaries following student campaign (2 February 2022)

"Unmanageable" social work caseloads putting vulnerable at risk (27 January 2022)

SWU Campaign Fund launches the #FoodIsCare campaign (29 November 2021)

SWU Campaign Fund delivers first round of funding for member led campaigns (9 November 2021)

SWU Campaign Fund now accepting applications (2 September 2021)

SWU and Campaign Collective to support member led campaigns (3 August 2021)

=== SWU Media Campaign ===
The Social Workers Union (SWU) has partnered with British Association of Social Workers. New advice and guidance for journalists reporting on the work of social workers launched by SWU and BASW https://swu-union.org.uk/2022/09/guidelines-media-reporting-social-workers-launched/ The guidelines were developed after members of the Social Workers Union (SWU) and British Association of Social Workers came forward with harrowing stories about the impact of poor media reporting about the profession. The guidance were produced in consultation with the press regulator IMPRESS and IPSO.

The five principles contained in the guidelines suggest that journalists:

- Maintain accuracy and take care to report on cases involving vulnerable groups accurately and in accordance with other standards relating to legal – or potential future – legal proceedings.
- Assess risk to ensure that coverage of issues does not create harm to the public and to individuals by ensuring no social workers are individually named or identifiable as working on a particular case (unless authorised to do so by court proceedings).
- Ensure right to privacy of social workers / mental health workers.
- Recognise social workers are not spokespeople or able to breach confidentiality so cannot defend themselves from allegations or misrepresentation, by responding to or correcting the record.
- Avoid portraying law-breaking as acceptable, excusable or perpetrators as victims.

== SWU Ambassadors ==
Started in 2019, the Social Workers Union Executive Committee appoint Ambassadors to promote SWU, social work, and social workers. Ambassadors have embraced the spirit of SWU and are involved with promoting SWU's values and campaigns as determined by the executive committee. Present Ambassadors: Harry Venning. Emma Lewell-Buck MP Dr Neil Thompson Professor Jermaine Ravalier
