= Climate Change Act 2008 =

Act of Parliament of the United Kingdom

Climate Change Act 2008 (Note: Section 101.)
- Act of Parliament
- Parliament of the United Kingdom
- Long title: An Act to set a target for the year 2050 for the reduction of targeted greenhouse gas emissions; to provide for a system of carbon budgeting; to establish a Committee on Climate Change; to confer powers to establish trading schemes for the purpose of limiting greenhouse gas emissions or encouraging activities that reduce such emissions or remove greenhouse gas from the atmosphere; to make provision about adaptation to climate change; to confer powers to make schemes for providing financial incentives to produce less domestic waste and to recycle more of what is produced; to make provision about the collection of household waste; to confer powers to make provision about charging for single use carrier bags; to amend the provisions of the Energy Act 2004 about renewable transport fuel obligations; to make provision about carbon emissions reduction targets; to make other provision about climate change; and for connected purposes.
- Citation: 2008 c. 27
- Introduced by: Lord Rooker, Hilary Benn
- Territorial extent: United Kingdom (Note: Section 99.)

Dates
- Royal assent: 26 November 2008
- Commencement: Various (Note: Section 100.)
Other legislation
Amends	House of Commons Disqualification Act 1975; Scottish Public Services Ombudsman Act 2002; Energy Act 2004
Amended by	Wales Act 2017; Sentencing Act 2020

Status: Amended

History of passage through Parliament

Text of statute as originally enacted

Revised text of statute as amended

Global carbon dioxide emissions 1800–2007

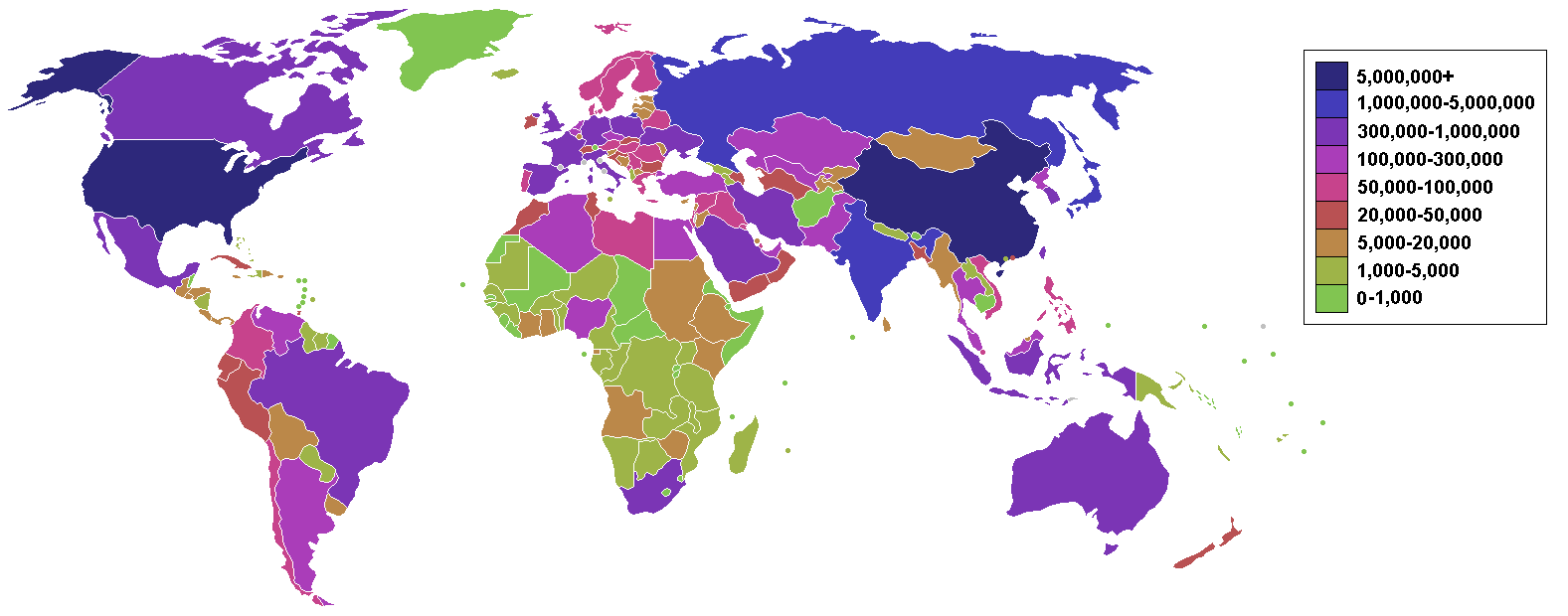
Countries by carbon dioxide emissions (blue the highest) in 2006

The Climate Change Act 2008 (c. 27) is an act of the Parliament of the United Kingdom. The act makes it the duty of the secretary of state to reduce net greenhouse gas emissions, toward avoiding dangerous climate change. The act aims to enable the United Kingdom to become a low-carbon economy and gives ministers powers to introduce the measures necessary to achieve a range of greenhouse gas reduction targets. An independent Committee on Climate Change was created under the act to provide advice to UK Government on these targets and related policies. In the act, 'Secretary of State' refers to the Secretary of State for Energy Security and Net Zero (originally the Secretary of State for Energy and Climate Change).

The original target was an 80% reduction by 2050 but in June 2019 this was strengthened to a "net zero" target of 100% reduction.

== Carbon emissions target ==
On 16 October 2008 Ed Miliband, Secretary of State for Energy and Climate Change, announced that the act would mandate an 80% cut overall in six greenhouse gases by 2050.

When first published the Government proposed that the act would set a target of a 60% cut, excluding international aviation and shipping, a figure that had been a Government ambition for some years. The original 60% figure was adopted based on the recommendation of the Royal Commission on Environmental Pollution, made in their June 2000 report Energy – The Changing Environment. If adopted by other countries too, a 60% cut by 2050 was thought likely to limit atmospheric carbon dioxide concentrations to no more than 550 parts per million which, it was generally thought at the time, would probably prevent global temperatures from rising by more than 2 °C (3.6 °F) and so avoid the most serious consequences of global warming. The Royal Commission went on to say that there should be an 80% cut by 2100, and that the 550 ppm upper limit should be 'kept under review'. They restated the importance of this in January 2006.

The Royal Commission's figures were based on a June 1996 decision of the EU Council of Ministers to limit emissions to 550 ppm, contained in their Community Strategy on Climate Change. This, in turn, was based on the 1995 IPCC Second Assessment Report, which first mentioned the 550 ppm – 2 °C connection.

A scientific assessment at the 2005 international Avoiding Dangerous Climate Change conference, held in Exeter under the UK presidency of the G8, concluded that at the level of 550 ppm it was likely that 2 °C would be exceeded, based on the projections of more recent climate models. Stabilising greenhouse gas concentrations at 450 ppm would only result in a 50% likelihood of limiting global warming to 2 °C, and that it would be necessary to achieve stabilisation below 400 ppm to give a relatively high certainty of not exceeding 2 °C.

Based on the current rate of increase – averaging about 2 ppm per year – greenhouse gas concentrations are likely to reach 400 ppm by 2016, 450 ppm by 2041, and 550 ppm by around 2091. It is because of this that environmental organisations and some political parties criticised the 60% target as being insufficiently ambitious, and why they demanded greater cuts (80%–100%), as mentioned below. The exclusion of emissions from aviation and shipping, combined with forecasts for growth in these areas, also means that the net effect of the bill would actually have only been a 35–50% total cut on 1990 levels by 2050.

Following pressure from the public, MPs and a recommendation from the Climate Change Committee, the 80% target was finally adopted.

In 2019, the Climate Change Act 2008 (2050 Target Amendment) Order 2019 (SI 2019/1056) set a higher target of 100 per cent reduction in greenhouse gases by 2050, in line with the government's focus on Net-zero emissions (see Secretary of State for Energy Security and Net Zero).

== Legislative progress ==
The procedure for enacting legislation in the United Kingdom Parliament sometimes involves numerous consultative and debating stages.

=== Previous bill ===
The 2008 Climate Change Bill was preceded by a private member's bill of the same name drafted by Friends of the Earth and brought before Parliament on 7 April 2005. Although it received widespread support the bill was unable to make progress as Parliament was dissolved ahead of the 2005 general election.

=== Early day motion ===
Shortly after the 2005 general election, 412 of the 646 Members of Parliament signed an early day motion calling for a Climate Change Bill to be introduced, to include a requirement for 3% annual cuts in carbon emissions. Only three other early day motions had ever been signed by more than 400 MPs.

=== Pre-legislative scrutiny ===
The Labour Government announced the introduction of a Climate Change Bill in the Queen's speech, on 15 November 2006. The draft bill was published on 13 March 2007, but proposed five-year 'carbon budgets' rather than the annual targets many had called for. The Government believe that varying weather conditions make annual targets impractical.

The draft bill was scrutinised by three parliamentary committees. A joint select committee of 24 members from the House of Lords and the House of Commons, chaired by Lord Puttnam, was immediately established to scrutinize the bill. The Environment, Food and Rural Affairs Select Committee of the House of Commons also carried out its own inquiry into the draft bill, as did the Environmental Audit Committee. These Committees received evidence from a series of interested parties between April and July and cast votes on the final wording of their reports.

Among the critics giving evidence was Nigel Lawson who argued that the entire concept was counter-productive because humans would easily be able to adapt to the worst predictions of a 4-degree rise in temperature by the end of the century because, with an average world economic growth of 2%, they would be "seven times as well off as we are today", therefore it was not reasonable to impose a sacrifice on the "much poorer present generation".

The government response to the report was printed in October 2007.

=== Lords debates ===
The bill was introduced to the House of Lords by the Government on 14 November 2007. The first debate on the floor of the House (Second Reading) was held on 27 November 2007 and lasted six hours. This was followed by eight sittings in the Committee Stage, four further sittings at Report Stage and one more for Third Reading. All of these sittings (including Committee stage) took place on the floor of the House and ten votes for various amendments.

One of the votes rejected a proposal by a majority of 148 to 51 to change the target for 2050 from 60% to 80% below baseline 1990 emissions on the basis that they should wait for new scientific advice from the Committee on Climate Change before changing the target from 60%.

An amendment, to remove the Secretary of State for Energy and Climate Change's absolute duty to ensure that the 2050 target was met, and replace it with a duty to propose policies to meet the target, was narrowly defeated by 132 votes to 130 in the Third Reading in the House of Lords on 31 March 2008. The bill passed to the House of Commons.

=== Commons debates ===
On 9 June 2008, following the Second Reading of the bill, only five members of the House of Commons voted against. The five were Christopher Chope, Philip Davies, Peter Lilley, Andrew Tyrie, and Ann Widdecombe.

During the debate on the Third Reading on 28 October, the government rejected an opposition amendment to allow the Secretary of State to set the maximum level of carbon dioxide that may be emitted per unit of output by any generating station. After the Committee on Climate Change's advice on the level of the 2050 target was brought forward, the 2050 target was revised from 60% of 1990 carbon dioxide emissions to 80% of the six major greenhouse gas emissions at the instigation of the government. It was also agreed that the British share of aviation and shipping emissions would form part of the target, when a method of measuring these could be agreed.

The bill passed into law on 26 November 2008.

=== Amendments ===
In 2019, by the Climate Change Act 2008 (2050 Target Amendment) Order 2019 (SI 2019/1056), section 1 of the act was amended, replacing the target to reduce greenhouse gases by 80 per cent by 2050 with a target of 100 per cent.

== Positions ==
=== Political parties ===
The opposition Conservative Party supported the concept of a bill, and proposed their own variation ahead of the Government's. One of the key differences is that they were demanding annual carbon targets, and that the Committee on Climate Change should have an enhanced role, setting targets as well as advising governments.

The Liberal Democrats took a similar stance to the Conservatives, and were also of the opinion that setting targets every five years would be an abdication of responsibility, because a government typically remains in power for only four years. They also stated that the proposed 60% cut by 2050 may not be sufficient, and that "we may well need to aim more towards about 80%".

A stronger response was provided by the Green Party of England and Wales. They considered that legislation provides a 'massive opportunity', but that the draft Bill was 'dangerously unambitious'. Among their demands were annual targets and an overall emission cut of 90% by 2050. Respect – The Unity Coalition were also in favour of a 90% cut in carbon emissions by 2050, but did not express a view on the bill.

Among the nationalist political parties whose views were known, the concept of a Climate Change Bill was supported in principle by the Scottish National Party and the Democratic Unionist Party. Welsh Plaid Cymru proposed 3% year-on-year carbon cuts for Wales in their policy statements.

The UK Independence Party believed that the bill was only necessary because of a failure to devise a viable plan for other sources of energy to replace fossil fuels. They considered that the bill was 'deeply misguided', likely to cripple the economy and that it would destroy investment in alternative technologies. Instead they believed that the Government and Opposition 'need to be looking into proper alternatives like nuclear power', and that plans to invest in renewable alternative energies such as wind power and solar power, as well as cutting carbon emissions by 60%, were 'unachievable and unnecessary'.

=== Environmental groups ===
Friends of the Earth's Big Ask Campaign was one of the factors that influenced the government to include the Climate Change Bill in their legislative programme. The organisation demanded that the bill should include legally binding targets for a reduction of at least 3% a year, amounting a total cut of around 80% by 2050. They considered that a 60% cut in carbon emissions by 2050 was not a sufficient contribution from developed countries to the international action on climate change.

The UK arm of WWF supported the bill, but launched its Get on Board campaign for the 2050 carbon reduction target to be raised to at least 80%, including the UK share of emissions from international aviation and shipping. In addition, WWF-UK called for retention of the House of Lords' amendment that at least 70% of the UK's reduction should be achieved domestically (limiting to 30% the proportion of the reduction that can be achieved through purchasing 'carbon credits').

The other 50 or so environmental, international development and other organisations belonging to the Stop Climate Chaos coalition backed the Big Ask Campaign and shared similar views. The coalition itself criticised the Government for failing to acknowledge the 'global warming danger threshold' of 2 °C. Taking this into account, they believed that the 2020 target should be a minimum of 30%, with an 80% target for 2050. They also considered that the bill should include annual 3% reduction targets, cover aviation and shipping within its scope, and ban the purchase of carbon credits from overseas, a practice which they believe exports the emissions problem elsewhere.

The Joint Public Issues Team of the Baptist, Methodist, and United Reformed churches called for an 80% reduction in carbon emissions [by 2050], for not ignoring the contribution of air and sea travel, and for reductions of the United Kingdom's own emissions rather than relying on buying carbon credits from other countries.

=== Trade unions and businesses ===
The Confederation of British Industry, which has created its own climate change task force, welcomed the proposed bill, stating that it combined two vital elements, long-term clarity on policy direction and flexibility in its delivery.

Support for the bill was also given by the Trades Union Congress.

== Committee on Climate Change ==
The Committee on Climate Change, whose powers are invested by Part 2 of the act, was formally launched in December 2008 with Lord Adair Turner as its chair. There is also an Adaptation Sub-Committee (ASC), which sets the direction for adaptation matters including independent advice on preparing for climate change. The ASC is made up of experts from all fields of climate change, science and economics and is currently chaired by Baroness Brown of Cambridge.

== Outputs/reports ==
As required by this legislation, the UK Government has produced several reports, some of which are set to be updated at regular intervals. These reports include:

- Climate Change Risk Assessment (CCRA), first report published in 2012, second report published in 2017, and the third report was published in 2022.
- National Adaptation Programme (NAP), first report published in 2013, the second in July 2018. Publication of the third National Adaptation Programme, for 2023–28, occurred in July 2023.
- Adaptation Reporting Power (ARP), first comprehensive set of reports published in 2011 (from over 100 key organisations), second round of reports have started to be published in autumn of 2015. Planning for the third round of reports has started, with a consultation document published in June 2018 and a list of organisations has been published in a policy paper on 21 December 2018.

The above reports and outputs were supported by the UK Climate Impacts Programme (now known as UKCIP), and also the UKCP09 projections. From late 2018, these projections have been superseded by UKCP18 projections.

== See also ==
- Climate Change and Sustainable Energy Act 2006 (United Kingdom)
- Climate change in the United Kingdom
- Climate and Nature Bill
