= CSO =

CSO or C.S.O. may refer to:

== Occupations ==
- Chief scientific officer
- Chief Scientist Office of the Scottish government
- Chief security officer
- Chief services officer
- Chief Signal Officer (U.S. Army)
- Chief strategy officer
- Chief sustainability officer
- Combat systems officer (U.S. Air Force)
- Community service officer
- Police community support officer
- Sales manager (chief sales officer)
- Chief of Space Operations, the head of the United States Space Force

== Orchestras ==
- Canberra Symphony Orchestra
- Canton Symphony Orchestra
- Carmel Symphony Orchestra
- Charleston Symphony Orchestra
- Charlotte Symphony Orchestra
- Chicago Symphony Orchestra
- Christchurch Symphony Orchestra
- Cincinnati Symphony Orchestra
- Colorado Symphony Orchestra
- Columbia Symphony Orchestra
- Columbus Symphony Orchestra

== Organizations ==
- Bureau of Conflict and Stabilization Operations, at the US Department of State
- Centers for Space Oceanography
- Central Statistical Organisation, India
- Central Statistics Office (Ireland)
- Central Statistics Organization, Afghanistan
- Civil society organization
- Coastal States Organization
- Community Service Organization
- Conference of Solidarity Support Organizations
- Czech Statistical Office

== Other ==
- Caltech Submillimeter Observatory, Mauna Kea, Hawaii
- Carbonyl sulfide
- CCSO Nameserver
- Colour-separation overlay, an alternative term for chroma key visual processing
- Combined sewer overflow
- Composante Spatiale Optique, a 2019 French spy satellite
- Compulsory stock obligation
- Computer Science Ontology
- Counter-Strike Online, a tactical first-person shooter video game
- CSO Online, an online publication (Computer Security Online)
- Magdeburg–Cochstedt Airport in Saxony Anhalt, Germany (IATA airport code CSO)
- Circuito Sur de Oriente, national highway of Cuba

== See also ==
- Central Statistical Office (disambiguation)
- Central Statistics Office (disambiguation)
- Court security officer (disambiguation)
