= Piotr Duda =

Polish political leader (born 1962)

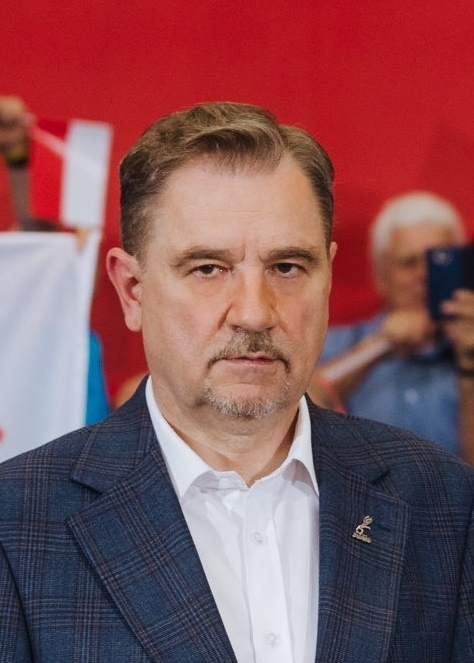
Piotr Duda in 2023.

Piotr Duda (born 15 June 1962 in Wielowieś) is a Polish activist and political leader who has been Chairman of Solidarity since 2010.

== Biography ==
Duda worked at the Huta Gliwice as a machinist since 1980. In the years 1982–1983, he served in the 6th Pomeranian Airborne Division. He participated in the Polish Military Contingent in Syria as part of the UNDOF mission. Then after his military service he returned to work at Huta Gliwice.

He has been a member Solidarity since 1980. In 1992, he was elected chairman of the works committee. In 1995, he joined the presidium of the Silesian-Dąbrowa regional board, and two years later took the position of treasurer of the regional board. At that time, he also became treasurer of the AWS Social Movement in the Katowice district (a position he held during the early period of the party's activity). In 2002, he won the election for chairman of Solidarity in the Silesian-Dąbrowa Region. He was re-elected in 2006 and 2010. He also became a member of the National Commission of Solidarity.

On 21 October 2010, he was elected chairman of the National Commission of Solidarity, defeating incumbent Janusz Śniadek, who was seeking re-election. He was re-elected to this position in 2014, 2018, and 2023. He was also the president of the board of the Foundation for the Health of Children and Youth of the Silesian-Dąbrowa Region named after Grzegorz Kolosa.

In October 2015, on behalf of Solidarity, he became a member of the newly established Council for Social Dialogue; he joined its presidium as one of the seven vice-chairmen.

== Decorations ==
- Commander's Cross with Star of the Order of Polonia Restituta – 2025
