= Court security officer =

Court security officer may refer to:

- Court security officer (England and Wales)
- Court security officers of the United States Marshals Service

== See also ==
- Bailiff
- Connecticut Judicial Marshal
- New York State Court Officers
- Officer of the court
