= Central Bureau of Statistics =

Central Bureau of Statistics may refer to:

- Central Bureau of Statistics (Aruba)
- Israel Central Bureau of Statistics
- Central Bureau of Statistics (Namibia)
- Central Bureau of Statistics (Nepal)
- Central Bureau of Statistics (North Korea)
- Palestinian Central Bureau of Statistics
- Central Bureau of Statistics (Sudan)
- Central Bureau of Statistics (Syria)
- Statistics Netherlands, formerly known as the Central Bureau of Statistics

== See also ==
- List of national and international statistical services
- Central Statistical Office
