= Solidarity (Polish trade union) =

Polish trade union formed in 1980

- Independent Self-Governing Trade Union "Solidarity"
- Niezależny Samorządny Związek Zawodowy „Solidarność”
- Solidarity logo
- Founded: 31 August 1980; 46 years ago (recognised); 17 September 1980 (1st Congress); 10 November 1980 (registered); 17 April 1989 (re-legalized)
- Type: Labour movement
- Headquarters: Gdańsk, Poland
- Location: Poland
- Members: Almost 10 million at the end of the first year 680,000 in 2010; Over 400,000 in 2011
- Key people: Anna Walentynowicz, Lech Wałęsa, Piotr Duda
- Affiliations: ITUC, ETUC, TUAC
- Website: Solidarnosc.org.pl (in English)

Solidarity (Polish: „Solidarność”, pronounced [sɔliˈdarnɔɕt͡ɕ]), full name Independent Self-Governing Trade Union "Solidarity" (Niezależny Samorządny Związek Zawodowy „Solidarność” [ɲɛzaˈlɛʐnɨ samɔˈʐɔndnɨ ˈzvjɔ̃zɛɡ zavɔˈdɔvɨ sɔliˈdarnɔɕt͡ɕ], abbreviated NSZZ „Solidarność”), is a Polish trade union founded in August 1980 at the Lenin Shipyard in Gdańsk, Poland. Subsequently, it was the first independent trade union in a Warsaw Pact country to be recognised by the state.

The union's membership peaked at 10 million in September 1981, representing one-third of the country's working-age population. In 1983 Solidarity's leader Lech Wałęsa was awarded the Nobel Peace Prize, and the union is widely recognized as having played a central role in the end of communist rule in Poland. This led to the appointment of the first noncommunist Prime Minister since the 1940s.

In the 1980s, Solidarity was a broad anti-authoritarian social movement, using methods of civil resistance to advance the causes of workers' rights and social change. The Government attempted in the early 1980s to destroy the union through the imposition of martial law in Poland and the use of political repression.

Operating underground, with substantial financial support from the Vatican and the United States, the union survived and in the late 1980s had entered into negotiations with the government. The 1989 round table talks between the government and the Solidarity-led opposition produced an agreement for the 1989 legislative elections, the country's first pluralistic election since 1947. By the end of August, a Solidarity-led coalition government was formed, and in December 1990 Wałęsa was elected President of Poland.

== History ==
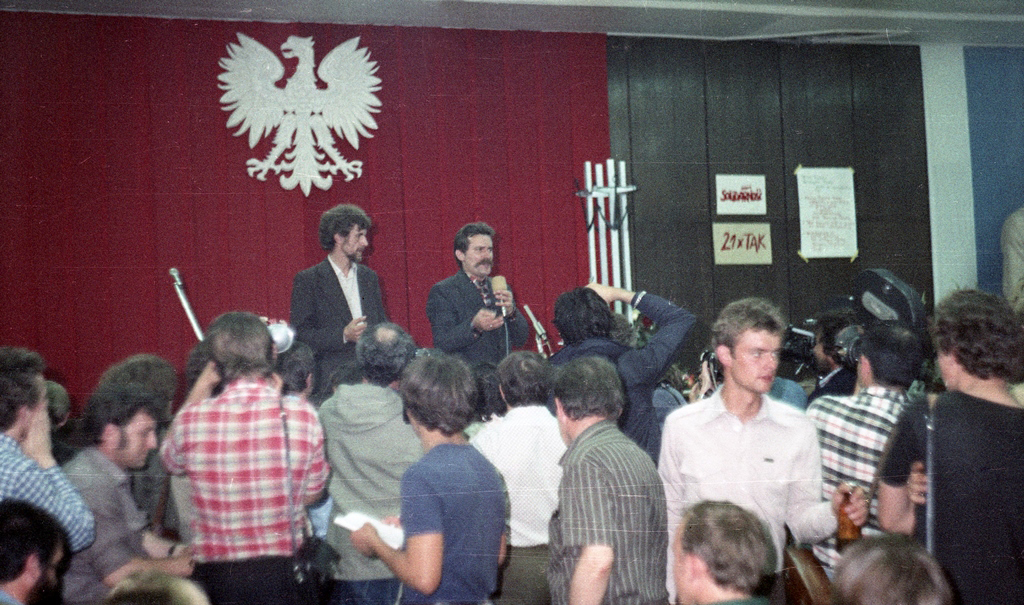
Strike committee at the Lenin Shipyard, August 1980. On stage are Bogdan Lis (left) and Lech Wałęsa (right).

In the 1970s Poland's government raised food prices while wages were stagnant. This and other stresses led to protests in 1976 and a subsequent government crackdown on dissent. The KOR, the ROPCiO and other groups began to form underground networks to monitor and oppose the government's behaviour. Labour unions formed an important part of this network. In 1979, the Polish economy shrank for the first time since World War II, by two percent. Foreign debt reached around $18 billion by 1980.

Anna Walentynowicz was fired from the Gdańsk Shipyard on 7 August 1980, five months before she was due to retire, for participation in the illegal trade union. This management decision enraged the workers of the shipyard, who staged a strike action on 14 August, defending Walentynowicz and demanding her reinstatement. She and Alina Pienkowska transformed a strike over bread and butter issues into a solidarity strike in sympathy with strikes on other establishments.

Solidarity emerged on 31 August 1980 at the Gdańsk Shipyard when the Communist government of Poland signed the agreement allowing for its existence. On 17 September 1980, over twenty Inter-factory Founding Committees of independent trade unions merged at the congress into one national organisation, NSZZ Solidarność (Solidarity). It officially registered on 10 November 1980.

Lech Wałęsa and others formed a broad anti-Soviet social movement ranging from people associated with the Catholic Church to members of the anti-Soviet left. Polish nationalism, together with pro-American liberalism, played an important part in the development of Solidarity in the 1980s. Solidarity advocated non-violence in its members' activities. In September 1981, Solidarity's first national congress elected Wałęsa as a president and adopted a republican program, the "Self-governing Republic". The government attempted unsuccessfully to destroy the union with the martial law of 1981 and several years of repression.

Roundtable Talks (from 6 February to 5 April 1989) between the government and Solidarity-led opposition led to semi-free elections on 4 June 1989. By the end of August a Solidarity-led coalition government was formed and Tadeusz Mazowiecki was elected Prime Minister. In December 1990, Wałęsa was elected President of Poland, subsequently resigning his chairmanship of the union. Since 1989, Solidarity has become a more traditional trade union, and had relatively little impact on the political scene of Poland in the early 1990s. A political arm founded in 1996 as Solidarity Electoral Action (AWS) won the parliamentary election in 1997, but lost the following 2001 election. In following years, Solidarity had little influence on Polish politics.

== Support from the United States and the European Bloc ==
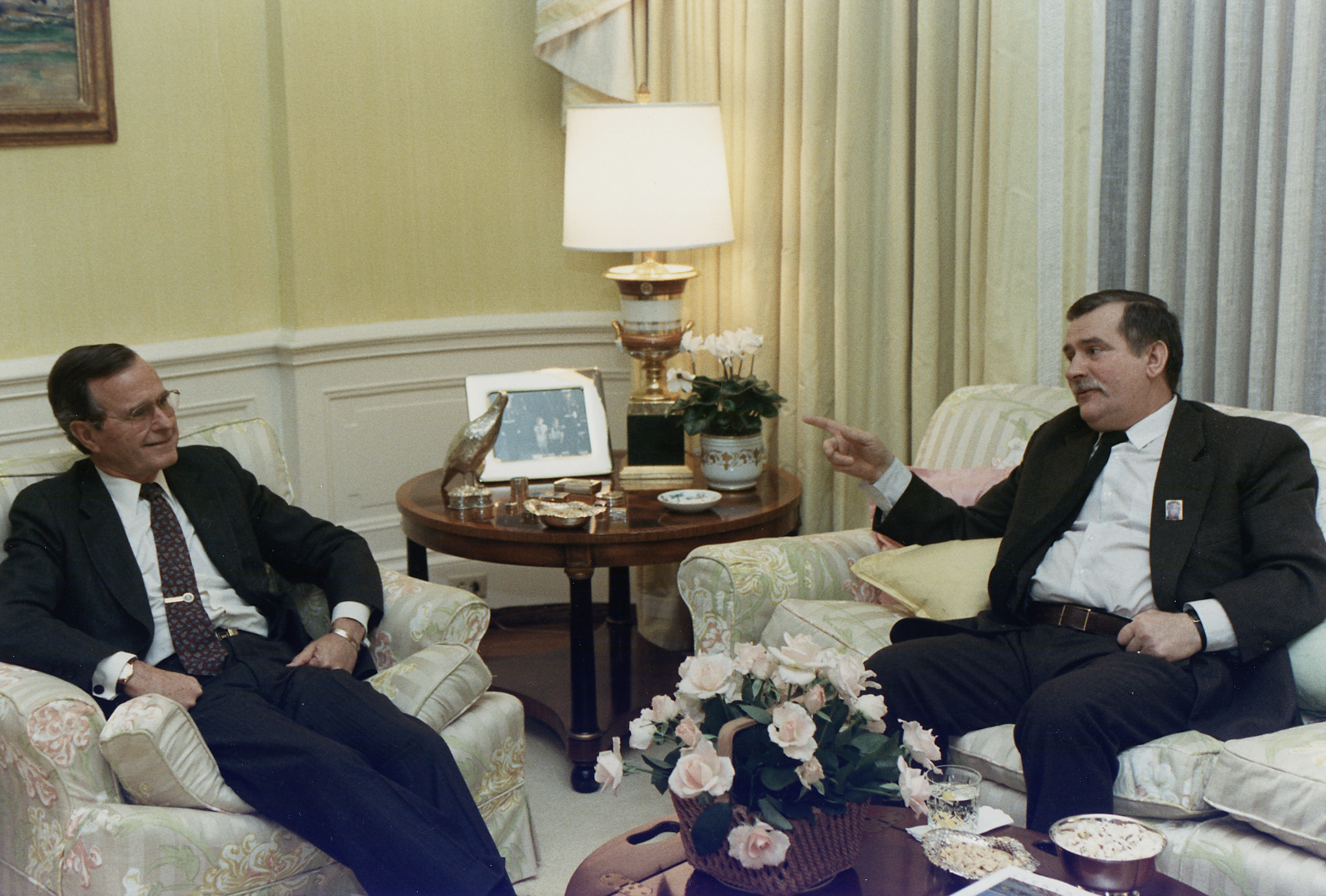
Meeting between Wałęsa and U.S. President George H. W. Bush, 1989

In the year leading up to martial law, Reagan Administration policies supported the Solidarity movement, waging a public relations campaign to deter what the Carter administration had seen as "an imminent move by large Soviet military forces into Poland." Michael Reisman from Yale Law School named operations in Poland as one of the covert regime change actions of the CIA during the Cold War. Colonel Ryszard Kukliński, a senior officer on the Polish General Staff, was secretly sending reports to CIA officer David Forden. The Central Intelligence Agency (CIA) transferred around $2 million yearly in cash to Solidarity from 1982 onwards, for a total of $10 million over five years. There were no direct links between the CIA and Solidarność, and all money was channeled through third parties. CIA officers were barred from meeting Solidarity leaders, and the CIA's contacts with Solidarność activists were weaker than those of the AFL–CIO, which raised $300,000 from its members, which were used to provide material and cash directly to Solidarity, with no control of Solidarity's use of it. The U.S. Congress authorized the National Endowment for Democracy to promote democracy, and the NED allocated $10 million to Solidarity.

The Polish government enacted martial law in December 1981, however, Solidarity was not alerted. Potential explanations for this vary; some believe that the CIA was caught off guard, while others suggest that American policy-makers viewed an internal crackdown as preferable to an "inevitable Soviet intervention." CIA support for Solidarity included money, equipment and training, which was coordinated by Special Operations. Henry Hyde, U.S. House intelligence committee member, stated that the USA provided "supplies and technical assistance in terms of clandestine newspapers, broadcasting, propaganda, money, organizational help and advice".

== Relations with the Catholic Church ==
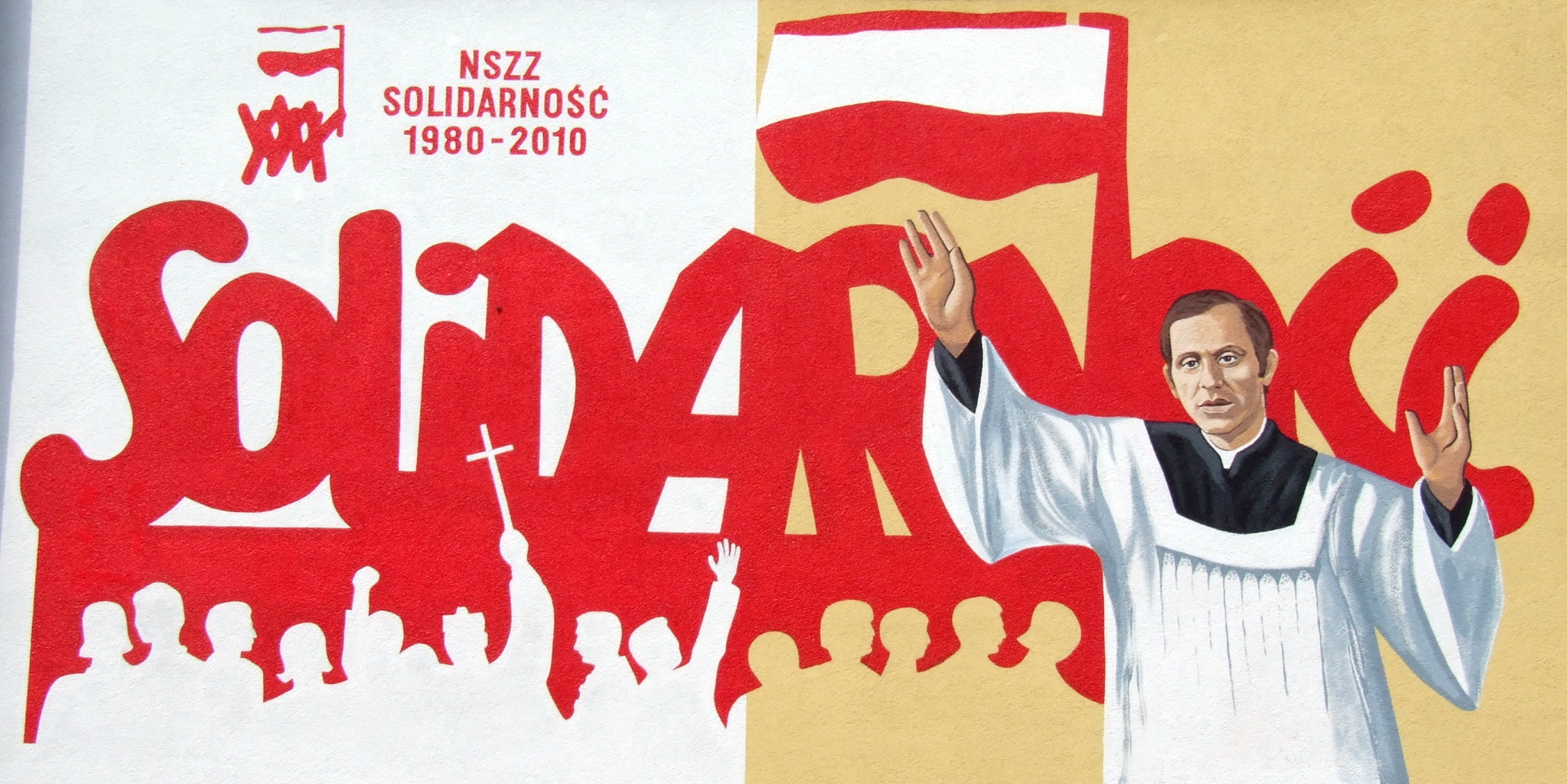
30th anniversary mural depicting the murdered priest Jerzy Popiełuszko who publicly supported Solidarity during the 1980s

In 2017, Solidarity backed a proposal to implement blue laws to prohibit Sunday shopping, a move supported by Polish bishops. A 2018 new Polish law banning almost all trade on Sundays has taken effect, with large supermarkets and most other retailers closed for the first time since liberal shopping laws were introduced in the 1990s. The Law and Justice party passed the legislation with the support of Prime Minister Mateusz Morawiecki.

Lech Wałęsa has said that Pope John Paul II, and more specifically, his 1979 visit to Poland, was a significant factor in the creation of Solidarity. As John Paul II was a Poland native, he was a figure that the citizens in Poland could identify with personally, but was beyond the reach of the Communist regime. For his actions regarding Poland and Solidarity during his pontificate, he has been named by many world leaders, including Wałęsa himself, to be one of the main causes of the downfall of not just the Polish regime, but Communism as a whole in Europe.

== Philosophical underpinnings ==
Although Leszek Kołakowski's works were officially banned in Poland, and he lived outside the country from the late 1960s, his philosophical ideas nonetheless exerted an influence on the Solidarity movement. Underground copies of his books and essays shaped the opinions of the Polish intellectual opposition. His 1971 essay Theses on Hope and Hopelessness, which suggested that self-organised social groups could gradually expand the spheres of civil society in a totalitarian state, helped inspire the dissident movements of the 1970s that led to the creation of Solidarity and provided a philosophical underpinning for the movement.

According to Kołakowski, a proletarian revolution has never occurred anywhere, as the October Revolution in Russia had nothing to do with Marxism in his view because it was achieved under the "Peace, Land and Bread" slogan. For Kołakowski, Solidarity was "perhaps closest to the working class revolution" that Karl Marx had predicted in the mid-1800s, involving "the revolutionary movement of industrial workers (very strongly supported by the intelligentsia) against the exploiters, that is to say, the state. And this solitary example of a working class revolution (if even this may be counted) was directed against a socialist state, and carried out under the sign of the cross, with the blessing of the Pope."

== Politics ==
Solidarity endorsed Karol Nawrocki the Law and Justice (PiS) candidate for the 2025 Polish presidential election, Solidarity also endorsed Andrzej Duda the Law and Justice (PiS) candidate in the 2020 Polish presidential election.

== Influence abroad ==
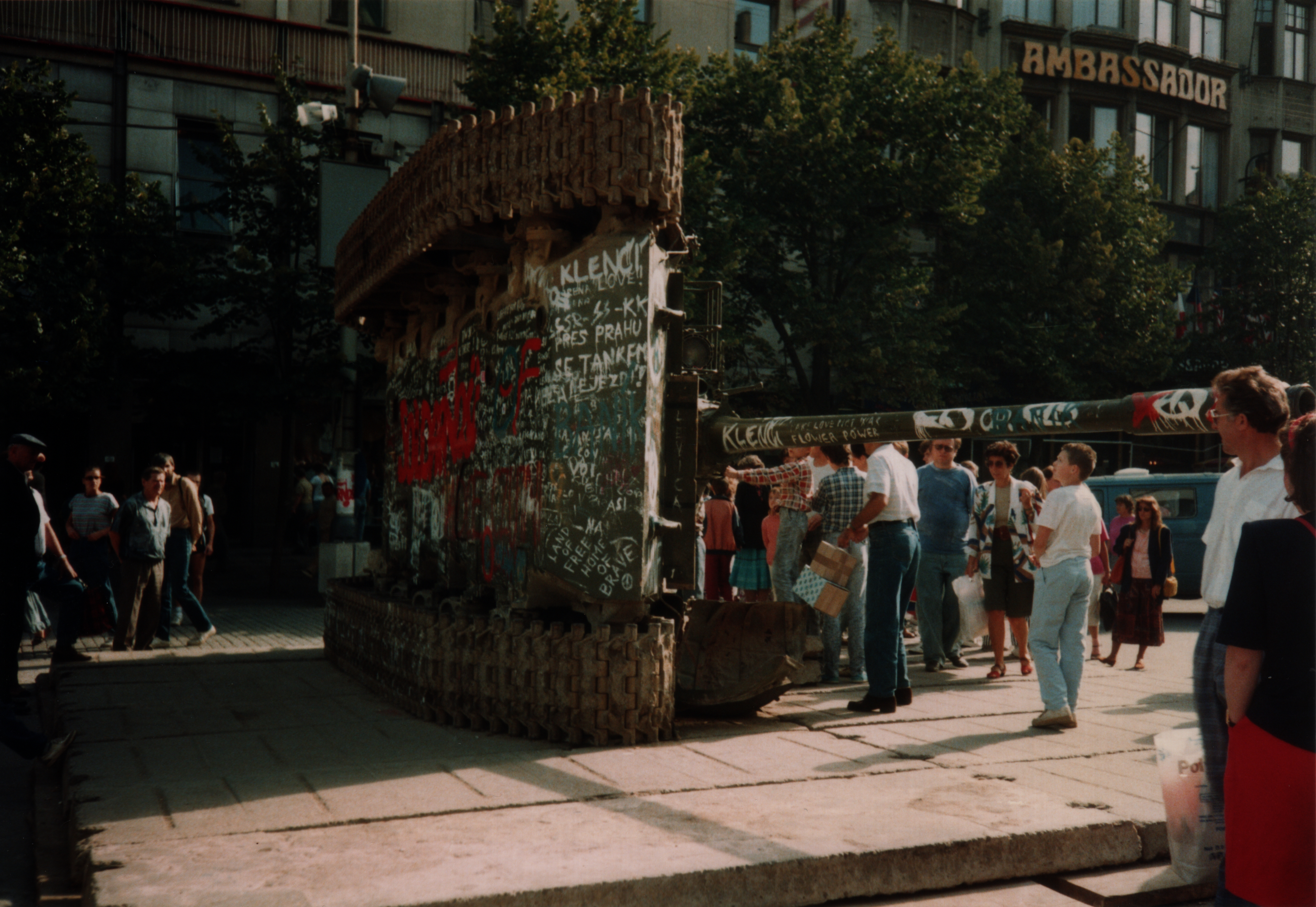
The logo of Solidarność painted on an overturned Soviet era T-55 in Prague in 1990

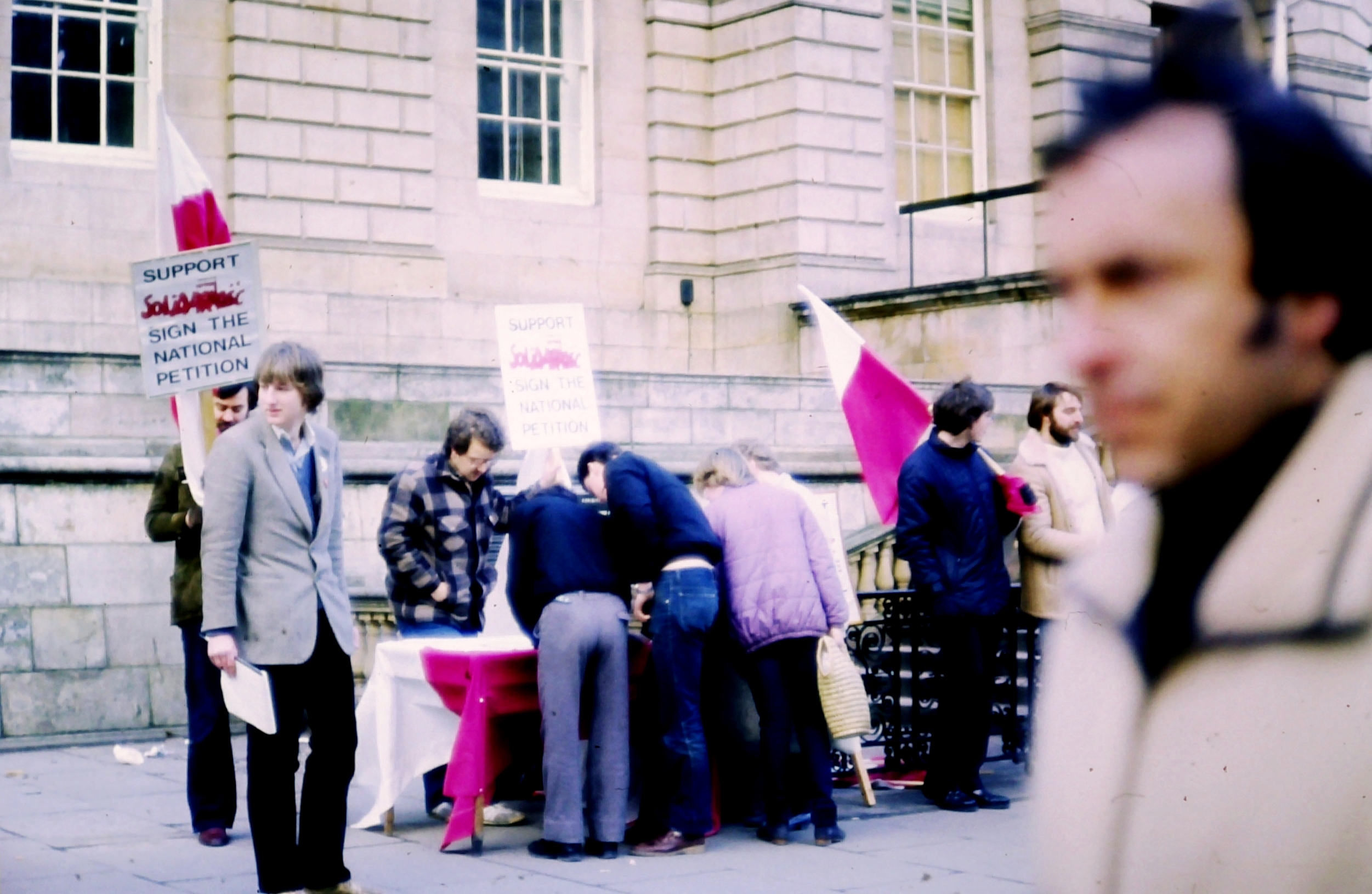
Students in Scotland collect signatures for a petition in support of Solidarity in 1981

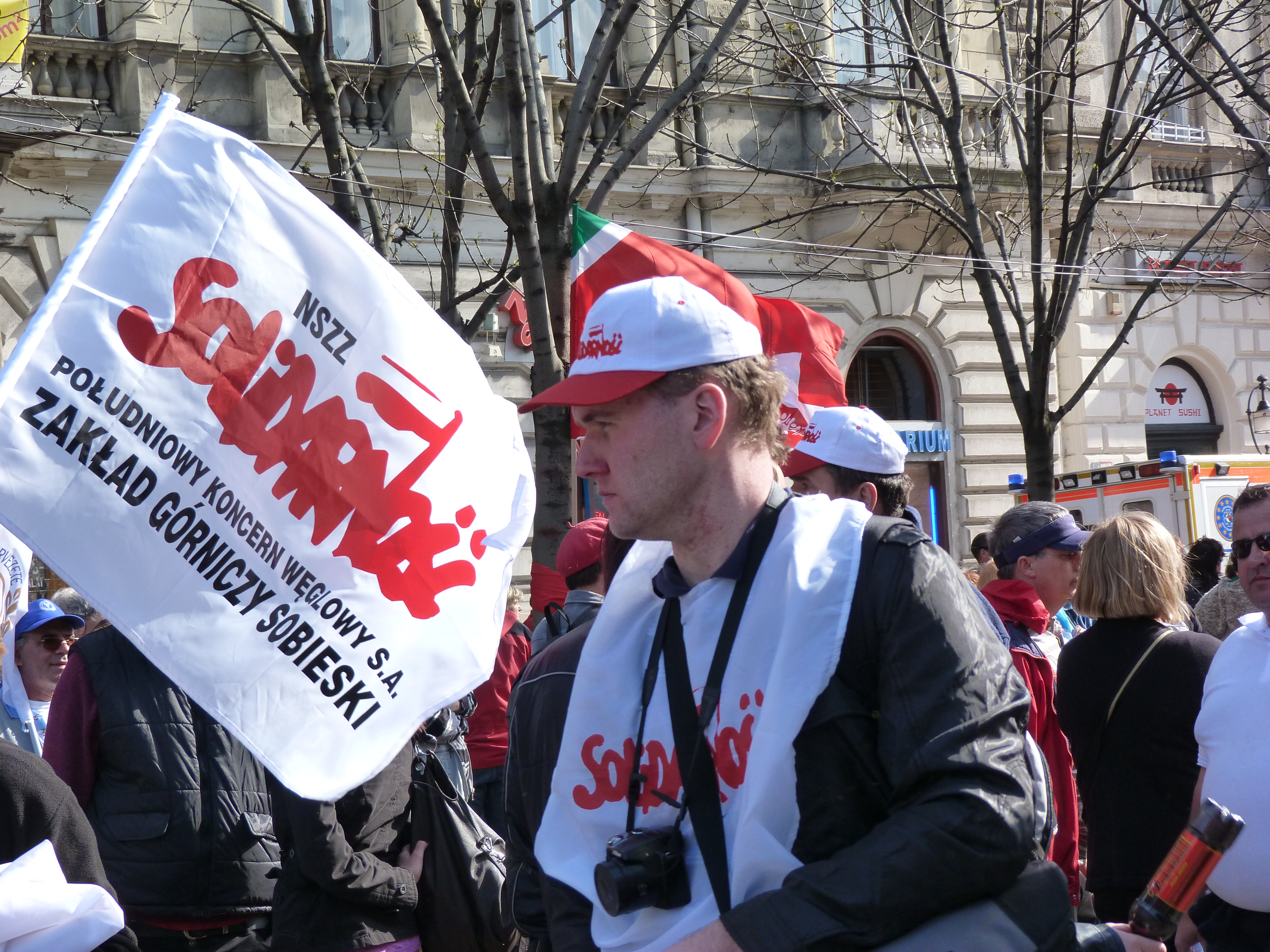
Solidarity, ETUC Demonstration—Budapest 2011

The survival of Solidarity was an unprecedented event not only in Poland, a satellite state of the USSR ruled in practice by a one-party Communist state, but the whole of the Eastern bloc. It meant a break in the hard-line stance of the Communist Polish United Workers' Party, which had bloodily ended a 1970 protest with machine-gun fire (killing over thirty and injuring over 1,000), and the broader Soviet Communist government in the Eastern Bloc, which had quelled both the 1956 Hungarian Uprising and the 1968 Prague Spring with Soviet-led invasions.

Solidarity's influence led to the intensification and spread of anti-Communist ideals and movements throughout the countries of the Eastern Bloc, weakening their Communist governments. As a result of the Round Table Agreement between the Polish government and the Solidarity-led opposition, elections were held in Poland on 4 June 1989, in which the opposition was allowed to field candidates against the Communist party—the first free elections in any Soviet bloc country. A new upper chamber (the Senate) was created in the Polish parliament and all of its 100 seats were contestable in the election, as well as one-third of the seats in the more important lower chamber (the Sejm). Solidarity won 99 of the 100 Senate seats and all 161 contestable seats in the Sejm—a victory that also triggered a chain reaction across the Soviet Union's satellite states, leading to a mostly bloodless chain of anti-communist events in Central and Eastern Europe known as the Revolutions of 1989 (Polish: Jesień Ludów, lit. 'Autumn of Nations'), which ended in the overthrow of each Moscow-imposed regime, and ultimately to the dissolution of the Soviet Union in the early 1990s.

Given the union's support from many western governments, relations with trade unions in capitalist countries could be complicated. For example, during the UK miners' strike of 1984–85, Wałęsa said that "The miners should fight, but with common sense—not with destruction" and said of Margaret Thatcher "With such a wise and brave woman, Britain will find a solution to the strike." However, David Jastrzębski, the president of Upper Silesia Solidarity, voiced his support of the striking miners: "Neither the British government's mounted police charges nor its truncheon blows, any more than the Polish junta's tanks or rifle fire, can break our common will to struggle for a better future for the working class." This was despite the fact that Arthur Scargill, president of the British National Union of Mineworkers had been highly critical of Solidarity, condemning it as an "anti-socialist organization which desires the overthrow of a socialist state". In 2005, the trade union Solidarity – The Union for British Workers was created by the far-right British National Party in honour of the original Polish union.

During the late 1980s, Solidarity had attempted to establish connections with the internal resistance to apartheid in South Africa. However, according to Wałęsa, attempts to develop links between the two forces were hampered by their geographical distance, the dearth of media coverage of events outside Poland's borders and especially in South Africa. As a result, relatively little engagement took place between the two groups.

In late 2008, several democratic opposition groups in the Russian Federation formed a Solidarity movement.

In the United States, the American Solidarity Party (formerly the Christian Democratic Party USA), a Christian democratic political party, attributes its namesake to Solidarity.

In a 2011 essay "The Jacobin Spirit" in the American magazine Jacobin, philosopher Slavoj Žižek called Solidarność' one of the "free spaces at a distance from state power" that used "defensive violence" to protect itself from state control. The notion of "defensive violence" runs in the vein of ideas postulated by Alain Badiou. In a conflict summary commissioned by the International Center on Nonviolent Conflict, Maciej Bartkowski wrote that "Solidarity always pursued its political objectives with a high degree of nonviolent discipline as well as self-imposed limitations."

== Organization ==
The union was officially founded on 17 September 1980, the union's supreme powers were vested in a legislative body, the Convention of Delegates (Zjazd Delegatów). The executive branch was the National Coordinating Commission (Krajowa Komisja Porozumiewawcza), later renamed the National Commission (Komisja Krajowa). The Union had a regional structure, comprising 38 regions (region) and two districts (okręg). At its highest, the Union had over 10 million members, which became the largest union membership in the world. During the Communist era, the 38 regional delegates were arrested and jailed when martial law came into effect on 13 December 1981 under General Wojciech Jaruzelski. After a one-year prison term the high-ranking members of the union were offered one way trips to any country accepting them (including Canada, the United States, and nations in the Middle East).

Solidarity was organized as an industrial union, or more specifically according to the One Big Union principle, along the lines of the Industrial Workers of the World and the Spanish Confederación Nacional del Trabajo (workers in every trade were organized by region, rather than by craft).

In 2010, Solidarity had more than 400,000 members. National Commission of Independent Self-Governing Trade Union is located in Gdańsk and is composed of Delegates from Regional General Congresses.

=== Regional structure ===
Solidarity is divided into 37 regions, and the territorial structure to a large degree reflects the shape of Polish voivodeships, established in 1975 and annulled in 1998 (see: Administrative division of People's Republic of Poland). The regions are:

- Gdańsk, based in Gdańsk
- Warmia-Masuria, based in Olsztyn
- Elbląg, based in Elbląg
- Lower Silesia, based in Wrocław
- Pila, based in Piła
- Western Pomerania, based in Szczecin
- Land of Łódź, based in Łódź
- Częstochowa, based in Częstochowa
- Land of Sandomierz, based in Stalowa Wola
- Płock-Kutno, based in Płock
- Lesser Poland, based in Kraków
- Opole Silesia, based in Opole
- Seashore, based in Koszalin
- Słupsk, based in Słupsk
- Zielona Góra, based in Zielona Góra
- Podbeskidzie, based in Bielsko-Biała
- Konin, based in Konin
- Southern Greater Poland, based in Kalisz
- Podlachia, based in Białystok
- Piotrków, based in Piotrków Trybunalski
- Cuiavia and Dobrzyń Land, based in Włocławek
- Carpathia, based in Krosno
- Land of Rzeszów, based in Rzeszów
- Toruń, based in Toruń
- Silesia-Zaglebie, based in Katowice
- Land of Radom, based in Radom
- Greater Poland, based in Poznań
- Gorzów, based in Gorzów Wielkopolski
- Holy Cross, based in Kielce
- Middle-East, based in Lublin
- Bydgoszcz, based in Bydgoszcz
- Jelenia Góra, based in Jelenia Góra
- Leszno, based in Leszno
- Chełm, based in Chełm
- Przemyśl-Jarosław, based in Przemyśl
- Mazovia, based in Warsaw
- Copper Basin, based in Legnica

=== Network of key factories ===
The network of Solidarity branches of the key factories of Poland was created on 14 April 1981 in Gdańsk. It was made of representatives of seventeen factories; each stood for the most important factory of every voivodeship of the pre-1975 Poland. However, there were two exceptions. There was no representative of the Koszalin Voivodeship, and the Katowice Voivodeship was represented by two factories:

Voivodeship	Represented by
Gdańsk	Vladimir Lenin Shipyard in Gdańsk
Szczecin	Szczecin Shipyard
Poznań	H. Cegielski - Poznań S.A.
Bydgoszcz	Rail Vehicles Repair Shop
Zielona Góra	Rolling Stock and Steel Works Zastal in Zielona Góra
Katowice	Wujek Coal Mine in Katowice
Katowice	The Spare Parts Factory Zgoda in Świętochłowice
Koszalin	No representative
Kraków	Vladimir Lenin Steelworks in Nowa Huta
Wrocław	Rail Carriage Factory Pafawag in Wrocław
Rzeszów	Factory of Communication Equipment WSK in Rzeszów
Białystok	Cotton Works Fasty in Białystok
Kielce	Ball Bearings Factory Iskra in Kielce
Olsztyn	Tire Company Stomil in Olsztyn
Lublin	Factory of Communication Equipment PZL in Świdnik
Łódź	Julian Marchlewski Cotton Works in Łódź
Warsaw	Ursus Factory in Warsaw
Opole	Malapanew Steelworks in Ozimek

== Chairmen ==
- Lech Wałęsa (1980–1991)
- Marian Krzaklewski (1991–2002)
- Janusz Śniadek (2002–2010)
- Piotr Duda (2010–present)

== See also ==
- 1981 warning strike in Poland
- 1988 Polish strikes
- 31 August 1982 demonstrations in Poland
- 80 Million
- Conference of Solidarity Support Organizations
- European Solidarity Centre
- Fighting Solidarity
- Hungarian Solidarity Movement
- Jastrzębie-Zdrój 1980 strikes
- Solidarity chaplaincy of Jerzy Popiełuszko
- Lublin 1980 strikes
- Polish 1970 protests
- Rural Solidarity
- Summer 1981 hunger demonstrations in Poland
