= Conference of Solidarity Support Organizations =

Conference of Solidarity Support Organizations (CSSO) was an international organization of national groups that supported the trade union Solidarność and human rights in Poland during the final years of the Polish People's Republic. Member organizations agreed to the CSSO Letter of Agreement of January 8/9, 1983, and there were eventually more than twenty international chapters.

== History ==
The CSSO emerged from a series of informal interorganizational meetings throughout 1982 among Solidarity support organizations. To provide a formal basis for cooperation, and to increase the unity of these support organizations, organizers drafted an agreement. To join the CSSO, organizations had to ratify the CSSO Letter of Agreement. In it, groups agreed to support and recognize Solidarity in Poland, along with the Coordinating Office Abroad of NSZZ Solidarnosc (based in Brussels, Belgium). Member organizations still had the freedom to support their own initiatives in Poland and were not required to support the Brussels office, nor proscribe any other links or channels with Solidarity. The CSSO ultimately included 46 organizations in 13 countries.

The CSSO was designed as a forum in which member organizations could exchange ideas and share experiences pertaining to protest activities in Poland. The organization held meetings in which member representatives would consider joint CSSO resolutions and actions. The CSSO did not control the activities or funds of the member organizations. .

== Achievements ==
The greatest impact of the CSSO was in fostering trust among the leaders of the member organizations. This did indeed foster collaboration and thus improved the efficacy of numerous initiatives and programs.

Most of the accomplishments came from the member organizations themselves. These accomplishments range from: a massive smuggling of materials to Solidarity and other groups in Poland; to the above-ground Family-to-Family assistance to the families of the imprisoned and persecuted Solidarity activists; to the Independent Polish Agency news agency providing information and photographs to the news media across the globe; to the professional periodic publications such as Kontakt (Paris), Pogląd and Meinung (West Berlin), Voice of Solidarity (London), ARKA de Informaciones (Mexico City), and Porando-geppo (Tokyo); to political action, lobbying and raising awareness activities in every country; to assistance to the Brussels Coordinating Office and activists in their work on behalf of Solidarity; to sending financial resources to Solidarity and opposition groups in Poland.

The membership of the CSSO organizations consisted primarily of the citizens of the countries where these organizations were located and usually included members who were not of Polish heritage. David Phillips, the first CSSO Secretary, was not of Polish ancestry. In fact in some organizations, the majority were not of Polish heritage, though sometimes did include non-Poles who were nevertheless fluent in Polish – Yoshiho Umeda (CSSO Asian Coordinator), and Jan Axel Stolz, who served as CSSO Secretary.

== CSSO Participating Organizations (1989) ==
- Solidarity Victorian Fellowship, Notting Hill Victoria AUSTRALIA
- Action Group in Support of Solidarity, Montreal, Quebec CANADA
- Friends of Solidarity, Kitchener, Ontario CANADA
- Friends of Solidarity Edmonton Alberta CANADA
- Friends of Solidarnosc Association Vancouver British Columbia CANADA
- Group of Solidarity in St. Catharines St. Catharines Ontario CANADA
- Polish Canadian Action Group Toronto Ontario CANADA
- Polish Socio-Political Group Independence-Solidarity Calgary Alberta CANADA
- Solidarity Support Committee of Toronto Toronto Ontario CANADA
- Solidarnosc Assistance Association Ottawa Ontario CANADA
- Stowarzyszenie Przyjaciół Solidarności - Winnipeg Winnipeg Manitoba CANADA
- Stot Solidarnosc Copenhagen DENMARK
- Edition Spotkania Paris FRANCE
- KONTAKT Vanves FRANCE
- Radio Solidarnosc Paris FRANCE
- Solidarite pour Solidarnosc Roubaix FRANCE
- Committee to Support ISTU Solidarity in Japan Tokyo JAPAN
- Comite de Apoyo a Solidarnosc Mexico DF MEXICO
- Inst. De Estudios de Culture y Sociedades Europeas Mexico DF MEXICO
- Solidaridad Mexico Mexico DF MEXICO
- Solidarity Organization in New Zealand, Inc. Auckland NEW ZEALAND
- Solidaritet Norge-Polen Oslo NORWAY
- Polen-Solidaritetskommittee I Uppsala Uppsala SWEDEN
- Svenska Stodkommitten for Solidaritet Lund SWEDEN
- Polish Solidarity Campaign London UNITED KINGDOM
- Solidarity Action Committee - Manchester Manchester UNITED KINGDOM
- Voice of Solidarity - publishing committee London UNITED KINGDOM
- Wyre Forest Polish Solidarity Campaign Kidderminster Worc. UNITED KINGDOM
- Brotherhood of Solidarity Members Chicago IL USA
- Committee in Support of Solidarity Cleveland OH USA
- Committee of Solidarity Members - Former Political Prisoners New York, NY USA
- Friends of Solidarity Families Project Buffalo NY USA
- Friends of Solidarity, Inc Washington DC USA
- Polonia Solidarity Association Reading PA USA
- Solidarity - California Los Angeles CA USA
- Solidarity and Human Rights Association Buffalo NY USA
- Solidarity International New York NY USA
- Solidarity International of Connecticut, Inc. New Britain CT USA
- Solidarity Support Committee of Rhode Island Providence RI USA
- Solidarnosc Association Seattle WA USA
- Support of Solidarity Boston MA USA
- "Solidarnosc" - Venezuela Caracas VENEZUELA
- Arbeitsgruppe "Solidarnosc" - Eschweiler Achen Eschweiler WEST GERMANY
- Gessellschaft Solidarnosc, e.V. West Berlin
- Hilfskomitte Solidarnosc Mainz WEST GERMANY
- Solidarität der freien Polen in Bayern, e.V. Munich WEST GERMANY

== Legacy ==
Papers and holdings of the CSSO have been preserved in countries where there were active chapters, or an active Polish diaspora population. This also includes Andre Blaszczynski's papers.
