= Central Statistics Office =

Central Statistics Office may refer to:

- Central Statistics Office (India)
- Central Statistics Office (Ireland)

== See also ==
- Central Statistical Office (disambiguation)
