= Central Statistical Office =

Central Statistical Office may refer to:

- Central Statistical Office (Poland)
- Central Statistical Office (United Kingdom)
- Hungarian Central Statistical Office
- Statistical Office of the Republic of Slovenia
- The Central Statistical Agency of Ethiopia, which was formerly known as the "Central Statistical Office"

== See also ==
- Central Statistics Office (disambiguation)
- Central Bureau of Statistics (disambiguation)
