= Energy Efficiency Best Practice programme =

UK Government initiative to promote energy efficiency in buildings and in industry

The United Kingdom's Energy Efficiency Best Practice programme (EEBPp) was an initiative of the Energy Efficiency Office (EEO) and was launched on 1 April 1989 with an anticipated life of ten years. The programme promoted energy efficient practices to industry and in the design and operation of buildings, through the provision of authoritative and impartial guidance aimed at carefully targeted audiences.

== Background ==
The 1973 oil crisis resulted in the UK government taking a strategic role in managing energy demand. In early 1974 a new Department of Energy was established by Edward Heath's government and was retained under Harold Wilson's premiership following the February 1974 election. In December of that year, a new energy efficiency programme was launched, that included the 'Save It' advertising campaign. In 1977 Tony Benn was appointed Energy Secretary and, in December 1977, a further four-year programme was announced including continuation of the Save It campaign. The Energy Survey Scheme, providing grants to industry for energy surveys, and the Energy Conservation Demonstration Scheme (EEDS), were introduced.

In May 1979 the Conservatives under Margaret Thatcher were elected and with their commitment to the role of free markets, some of the Labour party's initiatives were wound down. EEDS however, in which government support was provided for research, development and demonstration, was well regarded and continued although monitoring of projects was considered expensive and there were commercial risks for which government met the bill.

In 1982, the Armitage Norton Report for the Department of Energy promoted the idea of barriers to energy efficiency that might be overcome by information and awareness programmes that would improve the operation of markets. Following the re-election of the Conservatives in the 1983 General Election, Peter Walker was appointed Energy Secretary. He was regarded as an energy conservation enthusiast, while also presiding over a shift from energy conservation to energy efficiency - not 'doing without', but 'doing more with less'. He formed a new Energy Efficiency Office (EEO) in 1983, and 1986 was designed Energy Efficiency Year, with the 'Get More for Your Monergy' campaign.

In 1987, the Conservatives secured a third term, and Cecil Parkinson became Energy Secretary. A free market enthusiast, he cut the budget of the EEO and constrained its initiatives, such as information and advice, that did not interfere with the operation of free markets. Nevertheless various initiatives were introduced over the following five years including the Making a Corporate Commitment Campaign (MACC), the Energy Design Advice Scheme (EDAS), and the Energy Management Assistance Scheme (EMAS). The Energy Efficiency Best Practice programme (EEBPp) was among these. Its introduction corresponded with growing scientific concerns about global warming and a Cabinet seminar in 1989 where a strong case was presented in support of energy efficiency. The UK went on to produce its first environmental White Paper 'This Common Inheritance' in 1990, and the budget for the EEO rose from £26m in 1990 to £59m in 1992.

== Aims of the Energy Efficiency Best Practice programme ==
The aims of the Energy Efficiency Best Practice programme were given in its mission statement quoted by Rigby:

The Government’s policy on energy efficiency is to work with market and price mechanisms to encourage the take up of cost-effective energy efficiency measures which, on their own, are not achieving their market penetration potential. The EEBPp has been designed to help overcome one of the main market barriers inhibiting the successful implementation of this policy – lack of authoritative, targeted and impartial information.

While the term 'market barriers' was in widespread use, a report by the US Environmental Protection Agency introduced the term 'market failure' to explain why energy efficiency measures were not being adopted, and this was taken up by the Energy Efficiency Office to explain why energy efficiency investments failed to reach the scale regarded as cost effective. The Department of Energy presented the EEO view to the Energy Committee of the House of Commons in 1990-91. The EEO identified as a key barrier a lack of reliable and credible information, and outlined its approach of identifying and tackling specific barriers applicable to individual segments of the market and ensuring that the specific techniques and knowledge would be to hand. This became the basis of the EEBPp.

== Delivery of the programme: BRECSU and ETSU - Buildings and Industry ==
Responsibility for delivering the EEBPp was divided into two areas: the Energy Technology Support Unit (ETSU) based at Harwell focused on raising the efficiency of industrial process energy, and the Building Research Energy Conservation Support Unit (BRECSU), based at the Building Research Establishment addressed energy use in buildings.

The programme collated a wide range of technical and managerial information about energy efficiency technologies, and disseminated it in concise guidance documents to a variety of carefully targeted audiences including owners and managers, and their advisors.

Studies were also undertaken to investigate, in organisations that were large energy users, the performance of staff responsible for the selection, installation and operation of energy-using equipment. The findings implied that many energy management staff lacked the necessary practical knowledge, and the technical and analytical skills needed to ensure energy efficient operation of their facilities. The programme went on to address this gap by capacity-building: during the lifetime of the EEBPp, some 32 guidance publications and 37 case studies were produced on energy management and various national workshops were held.

Market research studies also identified that organisations lacked the knowledge to evaluate the economic potential of their energy investments, and various national workshops were held on the financial aspects of energy management.

In these ways, both BRECSU and ETSU produced a wide variety of motivational and guidance documentation, some technical, some non-technical in nature according to the target audience. The tasks of assembling the information and writing the guidance was let to specialist consultants and technical authors.

== EEBPp for buildings ==
In the buildings sector key players for targeting were identified as:

- demand side: owners, managers, occupiers and developers
- facilitators: regulators, planners, politicians, funders, fuel suppliers, educators and the media
- supply side: architects, engineers, contractors, surveyors, manufacturers, suppliers and estate agents.

The market for advice was also disaggregated into:

- building sectors: such as houses, hospitals, houses, schools factories, shops, sports centres, hotels etc
- technologies: such as condensing boilers, low energy lights, insulation types
- practices: such as air conditioning, design methods, maintenance procedures.

Sectoral strategies were devised by BRECSU with the aim of ensuring the information provided was relevant to the needs, concerns and circumstances of each sector, and that guidance would achieve the maximum impact.

For the buildings sector, four types of material were produced:

- Energy Consumption Guides - enabling owners and operators to compare their energy use against their competitors
- Good Practice Guides and Case Studies - offering guidance on how to implement energy efficiency measures illustrated by evidence of the success achieved by others
- New Practice Case Studies - reporting on the achievements of those at the cutting edge of innovation
- Future Practice - supporting pre-competitive research and development in innovative products

Promotional events were run by BRECSU to promote the guidance, which was also posted to enquirers and distributed via professional institutions.

== Legacy of the EEBPp ==
The technical and managerial guidance assembled, collated and disseminated by the Energy Efficiency Best Practice programme over a decade was remarkable. In their 2014 paper Mallaburn and Eyre say "The library of technical information we [in the UK] have accumulated is probably the most comprehensive anywhere in the world." Numerically it ran into hundreds of carefully written, well illustrated, and quality-checked publications with high production values.

The website of the Chartered Institution of Building Services Engineers contains pdf copies of 132 of the guides and some of the websites of the consultants responsible for writing them also offer copies of those they wrote. CIBSE also produced various Technical Memoranda that were either funded directly under the programme or that draw on the programme's outputs.

However there is no central record of all the guidance that was published, nor any comprehensive repository. Judging by the numbering there could easily be in excess of 500 publications. Much of it was distributed in hardcopy form and the programme ended before the storing and distribution of digital documents in pdf format had become commonplace.

== Impact assessment ==
The EEBPp had beneficial impacts on improving efficiency, and at least two papers provide estimates of the benefits.
