= Carmel Symphony Orchestra =

Symphony orchestra based in Indiana, US

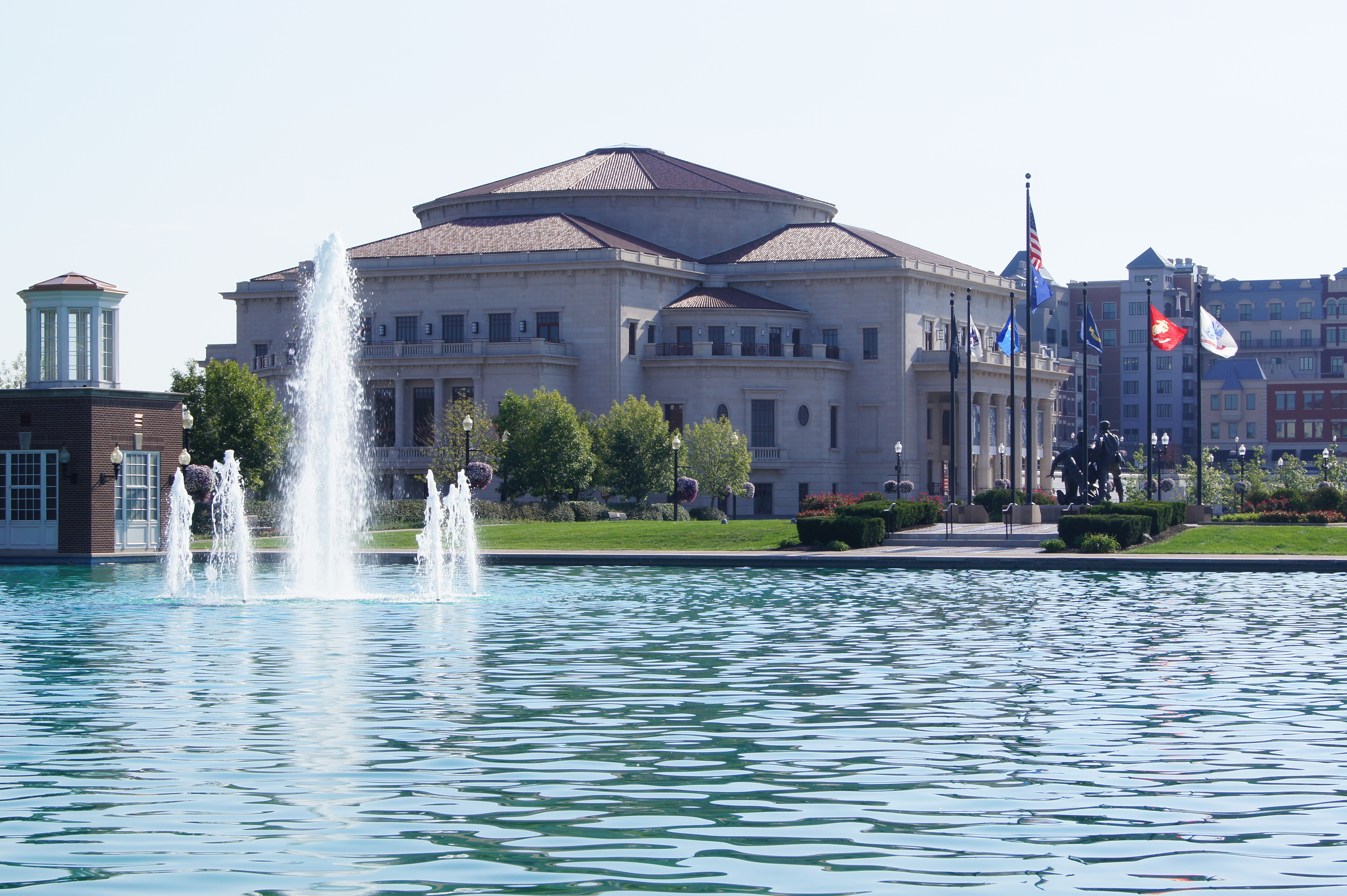
The Palladium at the Center for the Performing Arts, residence of the Carmel Symphony Orchestra (architect David M. Schwarz, 2006)

The Carmel Symphony Orchestra is a symphony orchestra based in Carmel, Indiana. In February 2011, the Carmel Symphony became the resident orchestra of the Palladium at the Center for the Performing Arts in Carmel.

In 2010, the symphony recorded with Michael Feinstein on his We Dreamed These Days album, and in 2011 performed alongside Feinstein at the Opening Gala of the Palladium, including guest artists Chris Botti, Dionne Warwick, Cheyenne Jackson and Neil Sedaka. The symphony has performed recently with Angela Brown, the winners of the Indianapolis Violin Competition, Di Wu, Sylvia McNair, Cameron Carpenter, and Dale Clevenger.

== Orchestra ==
The Carmel Symphony was launched by Latvian immigrant Viktors Ziedonis in 1976.

The Carmel Symphony Orchestra celebrated its 35th anniversary at the end of the 2010–11 season, and has continuously served the area since its founding in 1975. The Carmel Symphony is a non-profit arts organization with an 85-member orchestra. The Carmel Symphony Orchestra is composed of professional and formally trained musicians.

The symphony plays to more than 50,000 music lovers annually at concerts and large community events such as CarmelFest in Carmel, the Penrod Arts Fair in Indianapolis, Indiana, and an outdoor summer concert at Mallow Run Winery in Bargersville, Indiana.

== Education and community service ==
The Carmel Symphony participates in community service and education programs in Marion County and Hamilton County of central Indiana, including a series of performances for elementary age students called Sounds Exciting! and the annual Young Artist Competition.

== Conductors ==
Janna Hymes served as the music director and conductor with the organization from July 2017 to October 2023. The current music director and conductor is David Commanday.
