= Janusz Śniadek =

Polish labor and political leader (born 1955)

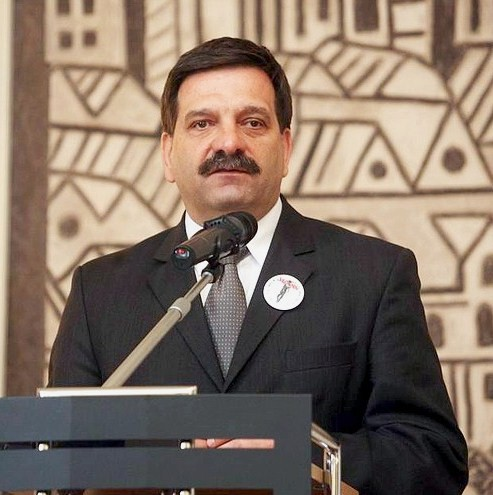
Janusz Śniadek

Janusz Józef Śniadek (Polish pronunciation: [ˈjanuʂ ˈɕɲadɛk]; born 26 May 1955 in Sopot) is a Polish labor and political leader who was Chairman of Solidarity in the years 2002-2010.

He studied in the department of shipbuilding of the Gdańsk University of Technology from 1975, and got a Master of Engineering in 1981. He worked then at the Stocznia Gdynia and joined the Solidarity anticommunist movement. During the period of Martial law in Poland, he participated in clandestine activities while contributing to the underground bulletin Kadłub.

From 1989 to 1998, he was a chairman of the Institutional Commission of Solidarity at the Stocznia Gdynia. From 1992 to 1995, he was a member of the Gdansk area's office, and from 1995 of the Union's national commission. In 1997, Janusz Śniadek became the vice-chairman of Solidarity. As an AWS member, he ran for 1997 parliamentary election but without success.

In 1998, he was selected chairman of Gdansk area's office. In 2002, he was elected as the chairman of Solidarity, replacing Marian Krzaklewski who was criticized because of AWS' defeat in the 2001 parliamentary election. Janusz Śniadek was reelected in September 2006. He supported European Constitution while considering it lacking in references to Christianity. In October 2010, Sniadek ran a third time for Chairman of Solidarity, but was beaten by Piotr Duda, who hails from Silesia.
