= Court security officer (England and Wales) =

A court security officer is, in England and Wales, a person employed by either the Lord Chancellor/Secretary of State for Justice (the role was combined in 2007) or a private company as a "court officer" and designated by the Lord Chancellor under section 51 (1) of the Courts Act 2003:

The Lord Chancellor may appoint such officers and other staff as appear to him appropriate for the purpose of discharging his general duty in relation to the courts.

== Powers ==
Court security officers may search people as they enter the court and remove them if they refuse to be searched.

They can also remove people in order to enable court business to be carried on without interference or delay, maintain order and secure the safety of any person in the court building. Reasonable force may be used in exercise of these powers.

Officers may ask a person to surrender (and failing that seize) property if they believe it may jeopardise the maintenance of order in the court, put the safety of any person in the court building at risk, or may be evidence of, or in relation to, an offence. Property that was taken for one of the first two reasons must be returned as the person leaves the court; property seized because it may be evidence of, or in relation to, an offence may be kept for up to 24 hours to enable a police constable to deal with it.

Court security officers may only exercise their powers when they are "readily identifiable", and assaulting or obstructing a court security officer in execution of his or her duties is an offence.

== Duties ==
According to the Ministry of Justice (MoJ) website, their Court Security Officers have the following duties:

- Monitoring premises and visitors via CCTV and x-ray machines, together with other security checks such as using hand-held metal detectors on court, uses and bag searches on arrival,
- Restraining someone attending court, ejecting someone from the court or excluding someone from the court,
- Controlling access doors and gates, checking of vehicles,
- Searching members of the public entering the court building,
- Checking pass holders' passes,
- Patrolling buildings and satellite buildings, keeping in contact with the control room with the use of hand-held radios,
- Securing the building when it is closed to the public,
- Escorting contractors, members of the Judiciary and VIPs etc.,
- Dealing with enquiries from Staff, Judiciary and public within the complex,
- Responding to panic alarm buttons (PABs) in Judges' rooms, courts and offices,
- Responding to any security issues within the complex and recording and reporting details of those incidents,
- Issuing security passes,
- Generally providing a secure environment.

According to the HMCTS, in 2018:

Over 350,000 banned items were confiscated or removed by HMCTS security staff.

== Officers ==
Court Security Officers may be Civil Servants who work for the Ministry of Justice - Her Majesty's Courts and Tribunals Service (HMCTS), or they may work for a private company, such as G4S or Mitie.

One of their main roles, regardless of employment, is access control and searches of people and possessions on entry.

=== Appearance and uniform ===
Generally, Court Security Officers wear uniform and have a smart, professional appearance. MoJ Court Security Officers wear a typical British police/security type uniform:

- white shirt with black clip-on tie
- black trousers
- black jacket or jumper
- any rank, identification numbers or letters are worn on epaulettes on the shoulder

Royal Courts of Justice ([commonly called the Law Courts] is a court building in London which houses the High Court and Court of Appeal of England and Wales) officers wear a "collar number" and the letters "RCJ".

Mitie Court Security Officers wear their company name on their epaulette as well as "COURT SECURITY OFFICER".

Some officers may wear stab vests.

== See also ==
- Bailiff
- Marshal
- Constable
- List of law enforcement agencies in the United Kingdom, Crown Dependencies and British Overseas Territories
