= Compulsory stock obligation =

United Kingdom oil reserve requirement

In the UK, a compulsory stock obligation (CSO) is a minimum stock of fuel reserves that must be held by a supplier in the United Kingdom against shortages or interruptions in supply. The scheme is administered by the Department of Trade and Industry (DTI). The CSO is based on the actual net imports.

== Description ==
The compulsory stock obligation was put in place due to regulations by EU, including EU Directive 2009/119/EC. Companies incur an obligation if they are a supplier of a volume of 100,000 tonnes of fuel per annum or greater. This obligation is assessed as being a holding of 67.5 days' stock (50 days for the UK).

== History ==
Section 6 of the Energy Act 1976 allows the Secretary of State for Energy and Climate Change to require oil suppliers to hold a minimum levels of oil stocks. The UK has released these stocks three times - during the lead up to the Gulf War in 1991, following the impact of Hurricanes Rita and Katrina in the US in 2005, and during the civil disruption in Libya in 2011.
