= List of statutory instruments of the United Kingdom, 1989 =

This is a complete list of all 1,534 statutory instruments published in the United Kingdom in the year 1989.

== Statutory instruments ==
=== 1-499 ===
==== 1–100 ====
- Criminal Justice Act 1988 (Commencement No. 5) Order 1989 (S.I. 1989/1)
- Food Protection (Emergency Prohibitions) (Wales) (No.5) Amendment Order 1989 (S.I. 1989/2)
- Food Protection (Emergency Prohibitions) Order 1989 (S.I. 1989/3)
- Export of Sheep (Prohibition) (No. 2) Amendment Order 1989 (S.I. 1989/5)
- Food Protection (Emergency Prohibitions) (England) Amendment Order 1989 (S.I. 1989/6)
- Dairy Produce Quotas (Amendment) Regulations 1989 (S.I. 1989/16)
- Education (Higher Education Corporations) (No. 5) Order 1989 (S.I. 1989/17)
- Criminal Appeal (Reviews of Sentencing) Rules 1989 (S.I. 1989/19)
- Horses (Landing from Northern Ireland and the Republic of Ireland) (Revocation) Order 1989 (S.I. 1989/23)
- Home Loss Payments Order 1989 (S.I. 1989/24)
- National Savings Bank (Amendment) Regulations 1989 (S.I. 1989/25)
- Social Security (Contributions and Allocation of Contributions) (Re-rating) Order 1989 (S.I. 1989/26)
- Merger Reference (GEC, Siemens and Plessey) Order 1989 (S.I. 1989/27)
- Financial Services Act 1986 (Single Property Schemes) (Exemption) Regulations 1989 (S.I. 1989/28)
- Official Listing of Securities (Units in Single Property Schemes) Order 1989 (S.I. 1989/29)
- Rules of the Air and Air Traffic Control (Fifth Amendment) Regulations 1989 (S.I. 1989/30)
- Trade Union Ballots and Elections (Independent Scrutineer Qualifications) (Amendment) Order 1989 (S.I. 1989/31)
- Personal Community Charge (Students) (Scotland) Regulations 1989 (S.I. 1989/32)
- Submarine Pipe-lines (Designated Owners) Order 1989 (S.I. 1989/33)
- Submarine Pipe-lines (Designated Owners) (No. 2) Order 1989 (S.I. 1989/34)
- Income Tax (Building Societies) (Amendment) Regulations 1989 (S.I. 1989/36)
- Anglian Water Authority (Quidenham Borehole) Order 1989 (S.I. 1989/41)
- Social Security Benefits Up-rating Order 1989 (S.I. 1989/43)
- Education (Inner London Education Authority) (Transitional and Supplementary Provisions) Order 1989 (S.I. 1989/46)
- Home Loss Payment (Specification of Amount) (Scotland) Regulations 1989 (S.I. 1989/47)
- Act of Adjournal (Consolidation Amendment) (Reference to European Court) 1989 (S.I. 1989/48)
- Fire Services (Appointments and Promotion) (Scotland) Amendment Regulations 1989 (S.I. 1989/49)
- Criminal Justice Act 1988 (Commencement No. 6) Order 1989 (S.I. 1989/50)
- National Health Service Functions (Directions to Authorities and Administration Arrangements) Regulations 1989 (S.I. 1989/51)
- Welfare of Poultry (Transport) (Amendment) Order 1989 (S.I. 1989/52)
- River Purification Boards (Establishment) Variation (Scotland) Order 1989 (S.I. 1989/59)
- County of Powys (Electoral Arrangements) Order 1989 (S.I. 1989/60)
- Local Government Reorganisation (Compensation) (West Yorkshire) Order 1989 (S.I. 1989/62)
- Personal Community Charge (Exemptions) (Scotland) Regulations 1989 (S.I. 1989/63)
- Control of Pollution (Landed Ships' Waste) (Amendment) Regulations 1989 (S.I. 1989/65)
- South Eastern Police (Amalgamation) Amendment Scheme Order 1989 (S.I. 1989/66)
- South Eastern Combined Fire Area Administration (Amendment) Scheme Order 1989 (S.I. 1989/67)
- Rate Support Grant (Scotland) (No.2) Order 1988 Approved by the House of Commons S.I. 1989/68)
- Revenue Support Grant (Scotland) Order 1988 Approved by the House of Commons S.I. 1989/69)
- Grants by Local Housing Authorities (Appropriate Percentage and Exchequer Contributions) Order 1989 (S.I. 1989/72)
- Fire Safety and Safety of Places of Sport Act 1987 (Commencement No. 5) Order 1989 (S.I. 1989/75)
- Fire Precautions (Factories, Offices, Shops and Railway Premises) Order 1989 (S.I. 1989/76)
- Fire Precautions (Application for Certificate) Regulations 1989 (S.I. 1989/77)
- Fire Precautions (Non-Certificated Factory, Office, Shop and Railway Premises) (Revocation) Regulations 1989 (S.I. 1989/78)
- Fire Precautions Act 1971 (Modifications) (Revocation) Regulations 1989 (S.I. 1989/79)
- Act of Sederunt (Consumer Arbitration Agreements) 1989 (S.I. 1989/80)
- Rent Assessment Committee (Assured Tenancies) (Scotland) Regulations 1989 (S.I. 1989/81)
- Merchant Shipping (Section 52 Inquiries) Rules (Amendment) Rules 1989 (S.I. 1989/84)
- Mostyn Docks (Pilotage) Harbour Revision Order 1989 (S.I. 1989/86)
- A483 Swansea-Manchester Trunk Road (Improvement at Bryn Sadwrn) Order 1989 (S.I. 1989/87)
- Bristol Development Corporation (Area and Constitution) Order 1988S.I. 1989/91)
- Bristol Development Corporation (Area and Constitution) (Amendment) Order 1988S.I. 1989/92)
- Bristol Development Corporation (Planning Functions) Order 1989 (S.I. 1989/93)
- The St. Edmundsbury (Parish of Haverhill) Order 1989 S.I. 1989/95
- Wireless Telegraphy (Broadcast Licence Charges and Exemption) (Amendment) Regulations 1989 (S.I. 1989/96)
- Commissioner for Local Administration in Scotland (Expenses) Regulations 1989 (S.I. 1989/98)
- Industrial Training Levy (Plastics Processing) Order 1989 (S.I. 1989/99)
- Merchant Shipping (Loading and Stability Assessment of Ro/Ro Passenger Ships) Regulations 1989 (S.I. 1989/100)

== 101–200 ==
- Public Telecommunication System Designation (Southampton Cable Limited) Order 1989 (S.I. 1989/101)
- Merchant Shipping (Provisions and Water) Regulations 1989 (S.I. 1989/102)
- Nurses, Midwives and Health Visitors (Parts of the Register) Amendment Order 1989 (S.I. 1989/104)
- Road Traffic (Carriage of Dangerous Substances in Packages etc.) (Amendment) Regulations 1989 (S.I. 1989/105)
- Civil Courts (Amendment) Order 1989 (S.I. 1989/106)
- Civil Courts (Amendment No. 2) Order 1989 (S.I. 1989/107)
- The Dartford (Parishes) Order 1989 S.I. 1989/108
- Nurses, Midwives and Health Visitors (Health Visitors—Admission to Training) Amendment Rules Approval Order 1989 (S.I. 1989/109)
- General Practice Finance Corporation (Transfer of Property etc. and Abolition) Order 1989 (S.I. 1989/110)
- Health and Medicines Act 1988 (Commencement No. 2) Order 1989 (S.I. 1989/111)
- Poisons (Amendment) Rules 1989 (S.I. 1989/112)
- Customs Duties (Standard Exchange Relief and Outward Processing Relief) (Revocation) Regulations 1989 (S.I. 1989/116)
- Highland Regional Council (River Lael and Allt Gleann a Mhadaidh) Water Order 1989 (S.I. 1989/117)
- District of South Staffordshire (Electoral Arrangements) Order 1989 (S.I. 1989/119)
- Anglian Water Authority (Bircham Newton Borehole) Order 1989 (S.I. 1989/121)
- Monopolies and Mergers Commission (Performance of Functions) Order 1989 (S.I. 1989/122)
- Wireless Telegraphy Apparatus (Receivers) (Exemption) Regulations 1989 (S.I. 1989/123)
- County Council of the Royal County of Berkshire A329 Relief Road Special Road Scheme 1988 Confirmation Instrument 1989 (S.I. 1989/124)
- Banking Act 1987 (Exempt Persons) Order 1989 (S.I. 1989/125)
- Fishing Vessels (Safety Training) Regulations 1989 (S.I. 1989/126)
- County of West Glamorgan (Electoral Arrangements) Order 1989 (S.I. 1989/127)
- Farm and Conservation Grant Scheme 1989 (S.I. 1989/128)
- A65 and A660 Trunk Roads (Burley-in-Wharfedale Bypass) Order 1989 (S.I. 1989/130)
- A65 and A660 Trunk Roads (Burley-in-Wharfedale) (Detrunking) Order 1989 (S.I. 1989/131)
- Cambridgeshire, Essex, Hertfordshire and Lincolnshire (County Boundaries) Order 1989 (S.I. 1989/133)
- Social Security (Claims and Payments and Payments on account, Overpayments and Recovery) Amendment Regulations 1989 (S.I. 1989/136)
- Home Purchase Assistance (Price-limits) Order 1989 (S.I. 1989/137)
- Local Government Act 1988 (Defined Activities) (Competition) (Wales) (Variation) Regulations 1989 (S.I. 1989/138)
- Diseases of Animals (Protein Processing) (Amendment) Order 1989 (S.I. 1989/139)
- Babies' Dummies (Safety) (Revocation) Regulations 1989 (S.I. 1989/141)
- Cod (Specified Sea Areas) (Prohibition of Fishing) Order 1989 (S.I. 1989/142)
- Diseases of Animals (Approved Disinfectants) (Amendment) Order 1989 (S.I. 1989/144)
- Inverclyde Enterprise Zones Designation Order 1989 (S.I. 1989/145)
- Assured Tenancies and Agricultural Occupancies (Forms) (Amendment) Regulations 1989 (S.I. 1989/146)
- Town and Country Planning (Use Classes) (Scotland) Order 1989 (S.I. 1989/147)
- Town and Country Planning (General Development) (Scotland) Amendment Order 1989 (S.I. 1989/148)
- Gas Cooking Appliances (Safety) Regulations 1989 (S.I. 1989/149)
- Secretaries of State (Government Oil Pipe-line and Petroleum Licences) Order 1989 (S.I. 1989/150)
- Bermuda Constitution (Amendment) Order 1989 (S.I. 1989/151)
- Consular Fees Order 1989 (S.I. 1989/152)
- Hong Kong (Legislative Powers) Order 1989 (S.I. 1989/153)
- Agricultural Levy Reliefs (Frozen Beef and Veal) Order 1989 (S.I. 1989/154)
- St. Helena Constitution Order 1989 (S.I. 1989/155)
- Naval, Military and Air Forces etc. (Disablement and Death) Service Pensions Amendment Order 1989 (S.I. 1989/156)
- Copyright (International Conventions) (Amendment) Order 1989 (S.I. 1989/157)
- Education Reform Act 1988 (Commencement No. 5) Order 1989 (S.I. 1989/164)
- Education (Grants) (Grant-Maintained Schools Limited) Regulations 1989 (S.I. 1989/165)
- Adoption Allowance Schemes Order 1989 (S.I. 1989/166)
- Electricity and Pipe-line Works (Assessment of Environmental Effects) Regulations 1989 (S.I. 1989/167)
- Precept Limitation (Prescribed Maximum) (Inner London Education Authority) Order 1989 (S.I. 1989/171)
- Petty Sessional Divisions (West Sussex) Order 1989 (S.I. 1989/172)
- Housing (Right to Buy) (Prescribed Persons) Order 1989 (S.I. 1989/174)
- Secondary Examinations Council (Designation of Staff) Order 1989 (S.I. 1989/176)
- Rules of the Supreme Court (Amendment) 1989 (S.I. 1989/177)
- Calshot Oyster Fishery (Variation) Order 1989 (S.I. 1989/178)
- Housing Support Grant (Scotland) Order 1989 (S.I. 1989/181)
- Merchant Shipping (Crew Accommodation) (Amendment) Regulations 1989 (S.I. 1989/184)
- Education (Grants for Training of Teachers and Community Education Workers) (Scotland) Regulations 1989 (S.I. 1989/185)
- Superannuation (Children's Pensions) (Earnings Limit) Order 1989 (S.I. 1989/187)
- Community Service Orders Rules 1989 (S.I. 1989/191)
- Medicines Act 1968 (Commencement No. 8) Order 1989 (S.I. 1989/192)
- Town and Country Planning (Fees for Applications and Deemed Applications) Regulations 1989 (S.I. 1989/193)
- Adoption Allowance Schemes (Scotland) Order 1989 (S.I. 1989/194)
- (A453) North East of Birmingham–Nottingham Trunk Road (Diversion at Long Hedge Lane) Order 1989 (S.I. 1989/198)
- (A453) North East of Birmingham-Nottingham Trunk Road The Birmingham-Nottingham Route (A42 Ashby-de-la-Zouch to Kegworth Section Slip Roads) Order 1989 (S.I. 1989/199)
- (A453) North East of Birmingham–Nottingham Trunk Road The Birmingham–Nottingham Route (A42 Ashby-de-la-Zouch to Kegworth Section) Order 1986 Variation Order 1989 (S.I. 1989/200)

== 201–300 ==
- Crick (Northamptonshire) to Doncaster Bypass Motorway Connecting Roads (No 2) Special Roads Supplementary Scheme 1986 Variation Scheme 1989 (S.I. 1989/201)
- North East of Birmingham–Nottingham Trunk Road (Breedon-On-The-Hill Bypass) Order 1957 Revocation Order 1989 (S.I. 1989/202)
- Housing Act 1988 (Commencement No. 3) Order 1989 (S.I. 1989/203)
- Highland Regional Council (Loch Beannach) Water Order 1989 (S.I. 1989/204)
- Certification Officer (Amendment of Fees) Regulations 1989 (S.I. 1989/205)
- Access to Personal Files (Social Services) Regulations 1989 (S.I. 1989/206)
- Building Societies (Deferred Shares) Order 1989 (S.I. 1989/207)
- Building Societies (Designated Capital Resources) (Deferred Shares) Order 1989 (S.I. 1989/208)
- Recreation Grounds (Revocation of Parish Council Byelaws) Order 1989 (S.I. 1989/209)
- Lincolnshire and Nottinghamshire (County Boundaries) Order 1989 (S.I. 1989/210)
- Building Societies (Designation of Qualifying Bodies) (Amendment) Order 1989 (S.I. 1989/215)
- Third Country Fishing (Enforcement) Order 1989 (S.I. 1989/217)
- Price Marking (Food) (Amendment) Order 1989 (S.I. 1989/218)
- Farm and Conservation Grant Regulations 1989 (S.I. 1989/219)
- Higher Education (Wales) Regulations 1989 (S.I. 1989/220)
- Local Authority Social Services (Designation of Functions) Order 1989 (S.I. 1989/222)
- City of Glasgow and East Kilbride Districts (Mid Lettrick Farm) Boundaries Amendment Order 1989 (S.I. 1989/223) (S. 22)
- Local Government Reorganisation (Croxteth Hall and Park) Order 1989 (S.I. 1989/224)
- Rate Limitation (Councils in England) (Prescribed Maximum) (Rates) Order 1989 (S.I. 1989/228)
- Severn-Trent Water Authority (Lee Brockhurst Boreholes) Order 1989 (S.I. 1989/229)
- Lothian and Borders Regions and Midlothian and Ettrick and Lauderdale Districts (Brothershiels) Boundaries Amendment Order 1989 (S.I. 1989/235) (S. 23)
- County Court (Amendment) Rules 1989 (S.I. 1989/236)
- Taunton–Fraddon Trunk Road A39 (Fairy Cross to Horns Cross Improvement) Order 1989 (S.I. 1989/237)
- Authorities for London Post-Graduate Teaching Hospitals Amendment Regulations 1989 (S.I. 1989/238)
- Housing (Right to Buy) (Prescribed Forms) (Amendment) Regulations 1989 (S.I. 1989/239)
- Housing (Right to Buy Delay Procedure) (Prescribed Forms) Regulations 1989 (S.I. 1989/240)
- Abolition of Domestic Rates (Domestic and Part Residential Subjects) (Scotland) Regulations 1989 (S.I. 1989/241)
- City of Glasgow and Eastwood Districts (Muirend Road/Netherlee Road) Boundaries Amendment Order 1989 (S.I. 1989/242) (S. 25)
- City of Glasgow and Strathkelvin Districts (Colston Road/Auchinairn Road) Boundaries Amendment Order 1989 (S.I. 1989/243) (S. 26)
- Warble Fly (England and Wales) (Amendment) Order 1989 (S.I. 1989/244)
- Misuse of Drugs (Licence Fees) (Amendment) Regulations 1989 (S.I. 1989/245)
- Export of Goods (Control) (Amendment No.2) Order 1989 (S.I. 1989/246)
- Heathrow Airport–London Noise Insulation Grants Scheme 1989 (S.I. 1989/247)
- Gatwick Airport—London Noise Insulation Grants Scheme 1989 (S.I. 1989/248)
- Access to Personal Files (Social Work) (Scotland) Regulations 1989 (S.I. 1989/251)
- Local Government Reorganisation (Capital Money) (Greater London) Order 1989 (S.I. 1989/255)
- Board of Inquiry (Army) (Amendment) Rules 1989 (S.I. 1989/256)
- Board of Inquiry (Air Force) (Amendment) Rules 1989 (S.I. 1989/257)
- High Court of Justiciary Fees Amendment Order 1989 (S.I. 1989/258)
- Sheriff Court Fees Amendment Order 1989 (S.I. 1989/259)
- Court of Session etc. Fees Amendment Order 1989 (S.I. 1989/260)
- Criminal Justice Act 1988 (Commencement No. 7) Order 1989 (S.I. 1989/264)
- Probation (Amendment) Rules 1989 (S.I. 1989/265)
- Sugar Beet (Research and Education) Order 1989 (S.I. 1989/266)
- Value Added Tax (Education) Order 1989 (S.I. 1989/267)
- The Tonbridge and Malling (Parishes) Order 1989 S.I. 1989/269
- Merchant Shipping (Weighing of Goods Vehicles and other Cargo) (Amendment) Regulations 1989 (S.I. 1989/270)
- Films (Exclusivity Agreements) Order 1989 (S.I. 1989/271)
- School Boards (Scotland) Act 1988 (Commencement) Order 1989 (S.I. 1989/272)
- School Boards (Scotland) Regulations 1989 (S.I. 1989/273)
- Industrial Training Levy (Construction Board) Order 1989 (S.I. 1989/274)
- Seeds (National Lists of Varieties) (Fees) (Amendment) Regulations 1989 (S.I. 1989/275)
- Plant Breeders' Rights (Fees) (Amendment) Regulations 1989 (S.I. 1989/276)
- Norfolk and Suffolk Broads (Staff and Property, etc.) Order 1989 (S.I. 1989/277)
- Education (Designated Institutions) Order 1989 (S.I. 1989/282)
- Carmarthen-Llandeilo Trunk Road A40 (Llandeilo Northern By-pass) Order 1989 (S.I. 1989/283)
- Bedfordshire and Hertfordshire (County Boundaries) Order 1989 (S.I. 1989/284)
- Zoonoses Order 1989 (S.I. 1989/285)
- Statutory Maternity Pay (Compensation of Employers) and Statutory Sick Pay (Additional Compensation of Employers) Amendment Regulations 1989 (S.I. 1989/286)
- Administration of Justice Act 1985 (Commencement No. 6) Order 1989 (S.I. 1989/287)
- Legal Aid Act 1988 (Commencement No.3) Order 1989 (S.I. 1989/288)
- Confirmation to Small Estates (Scotland) Order 1989 (S.I. 1989/289)
- Grampian and Highland Regions and Moray and Badenoch and Strathspey Districts (Dava/Aitnoch Farm) Boundaries Amendment Order 1989 (S.I. 1989/290) (S. 34)
- Finance Act 1986 (Stamp Duty Repeals) Order 1989 (S.I. 1989/291)
- Industrial Training Levy (Engineering Board) Order 1989 (S.I. 1989/292)
- Insurance (Fees) Regulations 1989 (S.I. 1989/293)
- Gaming Act (Variation of Fees) Order 1989 (S.I. 1989/294)
- Lotteries (Gaming Board Fees) Order 1989 (S.I. 1989/295)
- London Regional Transport (Levy) Order 1989 (S.I. 1989/296)
- Perth Harbour Revision Order 1988S.I. 1989/297)
- Teachers (Compensation for Redundancy and Premature Retirement) Regulations 1989 (S.I. 1989/298)
- Crown Court (Amendment) Rules 1989 (S.I. 1989/299)
- Magistrates' Courts (Amendment) Rules 1989 (S.I. 1989/300)

== 301–400 ==
- Local Authorities (Allowances) (Scotland) Amendment Regulations 1989 (S.I. 1989/301)
- Education (Prescribed Courses of Higher Education) (England) Regulations 1989 (S.I. 1989/302)
- Civil Aviation (Route Charges for Navigation Services) Regulations 1989 (S.I. 1989/303)
- London Government Reorganisation (Hampstead Heath) Order 1989 (S.I. 1989/304)
- Merchant Shipping (Light Dues) Regulations 1989 (S.I. 1989/305)
- National Health Service (Charges to Overseas Visitors) Regulations 1989 (S.I. 1989/306)
- National Assistance (Charges for Accommodation) Regulations 1989 (S.I. 1989/307)
- Education (National Curriculum) (Attainment Targets and Programmes of Study in Mathematics) Order 1989 (S.I. 1989/308)
- Education (National Curriculum) (Attainment Targets and Programmes of Study in Science) Order 1989 (S.I. 1989/309)
- Air Quality Standards Regulations 1989 (S.I. 1989/317)
- Control of Industrial Air Pollution (Registration of Works) Regulations 1989 (S.I. 1989/318)
- Health and Safety (Emissions into the Atmosphere) (Amendment) Regulations 1989 (S.I. 1989/319)
- Goods Vehicles (Plating and Testing) (Amendment) Regulations 1989 (S.I. 1989/320)
- Motor Vehicles (Tests) (Amendment) Regulations 1989 (S.I. 1989/321)
- Public Service Vehicles (Conditions of Fitness, Equipment, Use and Certification) (Amendment) Regulations 1989 (S.I. 1989/322)
- Merchant Shipping (Fees) Regulations 1989 (S.I. 1989/323)
- Education (Grants) (Royal Ballet School) Regulations 1989 (S.I. 1989/324)
- Wireless Telegraphy (Broadcast Licence Charges and Exemption) (Amendment No. 2) Regulations 1989 (S.I. 1989/325)
- National Health Service (Charges for Drugs and Appliances) (Scotland) Regulations 1989 (S.I. 1989/326)
- Registered Housing Associations (Accounting Requirements) (Amendment) Order 1989 (S.I. 1989/327)
- Industrial Assurance (Fees) Regulations 1989 (S.I. 1989/328)
- Education (Teachers) (Amendment) Regulations 1989 (S.I. 1989/329)
- Prison (Amendment) Rules 1989 (S.I. 1989/330)
- Young Offender Institution (Amendment) Rules 1989 (S.I. 1989/331)
- London Government Reorganisation (Pipe Subways) Order 1989 (S.I. 1989/335)
- Water Resources (Licences) (Amendment) Regulations 1989 (S.I. 1989/336)
- Health and Medicines Act 1988 (Commencement No. 3) Order 1989 (S.I. 1989/337)
- Civil Legal Aid (Assessment of Resources) Regulations 1989 (S.I. 1989/338)
- Civil Legal Aid (General) Regulations 1989 (S.I. 1989/339)
- Legal Advice and Assistance Regulations 1989 (S.I. 1989/340)
- Legal Advice and Assistance (Duty Solicitor) (Remuneration) Regulations 1989 (S.I. 1989/341)
- Legal Advice and Assistance at Police Stations (Remuneration) Regulations 1989 (S.I. 1989/342)
- Legal Aid in Criminal and Care Proceedings (Costs) Regulations 1989 (S.I. 1989/343)
- Legal Aid in Criminal and Care Proceedings (General) Regulations 1989 (S.I. 1989/344)
- Social Security (Contributions) Amendment Regulations 1989 (S.I. 1989/345)
- A51/52 North of Newcastle-under-Lyme–Nantwich–Tarporley–Tarvin Trunk Road (Nantwich Bypass) Order 1989 (S.I. 1989/346)
- A51/A52 Trunk Roads Nantwich (Detrunking) Order 1989 (S.I. 1989/347)
- A59 Samlesbury–Skipton Trunk Road (Improvement from Greengates to Gutteridge) Order 1989 (S.I. 1989/348)
- Civil Aviation (Navigation Services Charges) (Fourth Amendment) Regulations 1989 (S.I. 1989/349)
- Motor Vehicles (Type Approval and Approval Marks) (Fees) Regulations 1989 (S.I. 1989/350)
- Education (Schools and Further and Higher Education) Regulations 1989 (S.I. 1989/351)
- Education (Mandatory Awards) (Amendment) Regulations 1989 (S.I. 1989/352)
- Merchant Shipping Act 1988 (Commencement No. 3) Order 1989 (S.I. 1989/353)
- Export of Goods (Control) (Amendment No. 3) Order 1989 (S.I. 1989/354)
- Building Societies (General Charge and Fees) Regulations 1989 (S.I. 1989/355)
- Friendly Societies (Fees) Regulations 1989 (S.I. 1989/356)
- Industrial and Provident Societies (Amendment of Fees) Regulations 1989 (S.I. 1989/357)
- Industrial and Provident Societies (Credit Unions) (Amendment of Fees) Regulations 1989 (S.I. 1989/358)
- Housing Benefit (Community Charge Rebates) (Scotland) Amendment Regulations 1989 (S.I. 1989/361)
- Gaming Act (Variation of Fees) (Scotland) Order 1989 (S.I. 1989/362)
- National Health Service (Dental Charges) (Scotland) Regulations 1989 (S.I. 1989/363)
- National Health Service (Charges to Overseas Visitors) (Scotland) Regulations 1989 (S.I. 1989/364)
- PARLIAMENT S.I. 1989/365)
- Capital Allowances (Corresponding Northern Ireland Grants) Order 1989 (S.I. 1989/366)
- Housing (Change of Landlord) Regulations 1989 (S.I. 1989/367)
- Housing (Preservation of Right to Buy) Regulations 1989 (S.I. 1989/368)
- Education (Higher Education Corporations) (Designated Staff) Order 1989 (S.I. 1989/369)
- Education (Pre-Scheme Financial Statements) Regulations 1989 (S.I. 1989/370)
- Local Government Superannuation (Amendment) Regulations 1989 (S.I. 1989/371)
- Local Government (Superannuation and Compensation) (Amendment) Regulations 1989 (S.I. 1989/372)
- Motor Vehicles (Driving Licences) (Amendment) Regulations 1989 (S.I. 1989/373)
- Housing (Change of Landlord) (Prescribed Forms) Regulations 1989 (S.I. 1989/374)
- General Optical Council (Contact Lens (Qualifications etc.) (Amendment) Rules) Order of Council 1989 (S.I. 1989/375)
- Milk and Dairies and Milk (Special Designation) (Charges) (Amendment) Regulations 1989 (S.I. 1989/376)
- Education (Prescribed Public Examinations) Regulations 1989 (S.I. 1989/377)
- Teachers' Superannuation (Amendment) Regulations 1989 (S.I. 1989/378)
- Social Fund Maternity and Funeral Expenses (General) Amendment Regulations 1989 (S.I. 1989/379)
- Dairy Produce Quotas Regulations 1989 (S.I. 1989/380)
- County Court (Amendment No. 2) Rules 1989 (S.I. 1989/381)
- Family Law Reform Act 1987 (Commencement No. 2) Order 1989 (S.I. 1989/382)
- Magistrates' Courts (Custodianship Orders) (Amendment) Rules 1989 (S.I. 1989/383)
- Magistrates' Courts (Family Law Reform Act 1987) (Miscellaneous Amendments) Rules 1989 (S.I. 1989/384)
- Matrimonial Causes (Costs) (Amendment) Rules 1989 (S.I. 1989/385)
- Rules of the Supreme Court (Amendment No.2) 1989 (S.I. 1989/386)
- National Health Service (General Ophthalmic Services) (Scotland) Amendment Regulations 1989 (S.I. 1989/387)
- Criminal Legal Aid (Scotland) (Fees) Amendment Regulations 1989 (S.I. 1989/388)
- Legal Aid (Scotland) (Fees in Civil Proceedings) Amendment Regulations 1989 (S.I. 1989/389)
- Legal Aid (Scotland) (Fees in Criminal Proceedings) Amendment Regulations 1989 (S.I. 1989/390)
- Civil Legal Aid (Scotland) (Fees) Amendment Regulations 1989 (S.I. 1989/391)
- National Health Service (Optical Charges and Payments) (Scotland) Regulations 1989 (S.I. 1989/392)
- National Health Service (Travelling Expenses and Remission of Charges) (Scotland) Amendment Regulations 1989 (S.I. 1989/393)
- National Health Service (Dental Charges) Regulations 1989 (S.I. 1989/394)
- National Health Service (General Ophthalmic Services) Amendment Regulations 1989 (S.I. 1989/395)
- National Health Service (Optical Charges and Payments) Regulations 1989 (S.I. 1989/396)
- Insolvency (Amendment) Rules 1989 (S.I. 1989/397)
- Education (School Hours and Policies) (Information) Regulations 1989 (S.I. 1989/398)

== 401–500 ==
- The North Bedfordshire (Parishes) Order 1989 S.I. 1989/402
- Housing Act 1988 (Commencement No. 4) Order 1989 (S.I. 1989/404)
- Education (Bulmershe College of Higher Education Higher Education Corporation) (Dissolution) Order 1989 (S.I. 1989/408)
- Education (West Midlands College of Higher Education Higher Education Corporation) (Dissolution) Order 1989 (S.I. 1989/409)
- Education (Cambridgeshire College of Arts and Technology Higher Education Corporation) (Dissolution) Order 1989 (S.I. 1989/410)
- A627(M) (Rochdale—Lancashire/Yorkshire Motorway (M62)—Oldham) Special Roads Scheme 1989 (S.I. 1989/411)
- Personal Injuries (Civilians) Amendment Scheme 1989 (S.I. 1989/415)
- Housing Benefit (General) Amendment Regulations 1989 (S.I. 1989/416)
- Pensions Increase (Local Authorities' etc. Pensions) (Amendment) Regulations 1989 (S.I. 1989/417)
- Medicines (Fees Relating to Medicinal Products for Human Use) Regulations 1989 (S.I. 1989/418)
- National Health Service (Charges for Drugs and Appliances) Regulations 1989 (S.I. 1989/419)
- Injuries in War (Shore Employments) Compensation (Amendment) Scheme 1989 (S.I. 1989/420)
- Lloyd's Underwriters (Tax) Regulations 1989 (S.I. 1989/421)
- Housing (Scotland) (Superannuation Fund) Regulations 1989 (S.I. 1989/422)
- Right To Purchase From A Public Sector Landlord (Application Form) (Scotland) Regulations 1989 (S.I. 1989/423)
- Harbour Works (Assessment of Environmental Effects) (No.2) Regulations 1989 (S.I. 1989/424)
- Sea Fish Industry Authority (Levy) Regulations 1988 Confirmatory Order 1989 (S.I. 1989/425)
- Sea Fishing (Enforcement of Community Conservation Measures) (Amendment) Order 1989 (S.I. 1989/426)
- A62 (Gelderd Road, Gildersome Interchange) (Trunking) Order 1989 (S.I. 1989/427)
- European Parliamentary Elections (Welsh Forms) Order 1989 (S.I. 1989/428)
- Representation of the People (Welsh Forms) Order 1989 (S.I. 1989/429)
- Housing and Planning Act 1986 (Commencement No. 13) Order 1989 (S.I. 1989/430)
- Financial Services Act 1986 (Miscellaneous Exemptions) Order 1989 (S.I. 1989/431)
- National Assistance (Charges for Accommodation) (Scotland) Regulations 1989 (S.I. 1989/432)
- Grant-aided Colleges (Scotland) Grant Regulations 1989 (S.I. 1989/433)
- Act of Sederunt (Fees of Solicitors in the Sheriff Court) 1989 (S.I. 1989/434)
- Act of Sederunt (Rules of the Court of Session Amendment No.1) (Written Statements) 1989 (S.I. 1989/435)
- Act of Sederunt (Amendment of Ordinary Cause and Summary Cause Rules) (Written Statements) 1989 (S.I. 1989/436)
- Public Trustee (Fees) (Amendment) Order 1989 (S.I. 1989/437)
- Community Charges (Administration and Enforcement) Regulations 1989 (S.I. 1989/438)
- Valuation and Community Charge Tribunals Regulations 1989 (S.I. 1989/439)
- Valuation and Community Charge Tribunals (Transfer of Jurisdiction) Regulations 1989 (S.I. 1989/440)
- Valuation for Rating (Plant and Machinery) Regulations 1989 (S.I. 1989/441)
- Personal Community Charge (Exemptions) Order 1989 (S.I. 1989/442)
- Personal Community Charge (Students) Regulations 1989 (S.I. 1989/443)
- Further Education (Approved Associations) (Scotland) Grant Regulations 1989 (S.I. 1989/444)
- Act of Sederunt (Rules of the Court of Session Amendment No.2) (Solicitors' Fees) 1989 (S.I. 1989/445)
- National Health Service (Functions of Health Boards) (Scotland) Order 1989 (S.I. 1989/446)
- M1 Motorway (Stourton Interchange to Dewsbury Road Section) and Connecting Roads Scheme 1989 (S.I. 1989/447)
- M606 The Bradford (Oakenshaw–Staygate) Motorway Scheme 1967 (Revocation) Scheme 1988 Confirmation Instrument 1989 (S.I. 1989/448)
- M606 Motorway (Bradford Ring Road to M62 Chain Bar Interchange Section) and Connecting Roads Scheme 1989 (S.I. 1989/449)
- M621 Motorway (Ring Road, Beeston to Dewsbury Road Section) and Connecting Roads Scheme 1989 (S.I. 1989/450)
- Kirklees Metropolitan Council (M606 Motorway (Bradford Ring Road to M62 Chain Bar Interchange Section) and Connecting Roads) (Part) (Revocation) Scheme 1988 Confirmation Instrument 1989 (S.I. 1989/451)
- Leeds City Council (Urban Motorway) Special Road Schemes (Revocation) Scheme 1988 Confirmation Instrument 1989 (S.I. 1989/452)
- Social Security Benefits Up-rating Regulations 1989 (S.I. 1989/455)
- A15 Trunk Road (Bonby Lodge Slip Roads) Order 1989 (S.I. 1989/456)
- Health and Safety (Fees) Regulations 1989 (S.I. 1989/462)
- Grants to the Redundant Churches Fund Order 1989 (S.I. 1989/463)
- Service Subsidy Agreements (Tendering) (Amendment) Regulations 1989 (S.I. 1989/464)
- Banking Act 1987 (Exempt Transactions) (Amendment) Regulations 1989 (S.I. 1989/465)
- Capital Gains Tax (Annual Exempt Amount) Order 1989 (S.I. 1989/466)
- Income Tax (Indexation) Order 1989 (S.I. 1989/467)
- Inheritance Tax (Indexation) Order 1989 (S.I. 1989/468)
- Personal Equity Plan Regulations 1989 (S.I. 1989/469)
- Value Added Tax (Fund-Raising Events and Charities) Order 1989 (S.I. 1989/470)
- Value Added Tax (Increase of Registration Limits) Order 1989 (S.I. 1989/471)
- Value Added Tax (Self-supply of Construction Services) Order 1989 (S.I. 1989/472)
- Finance Act 1988 (Commencement) Order 1989 (S.I. 1989/473)
- North Western and North Wales Sea Fisheries District (Variation) Order 1989 (S.I. 1989/474)
- Community Charges (Information Concerning Social Security) Regulations 1989 (S.I. 1989/475)
- Community Charges (Information Concerning Social Security) (Scotland) Regulations 1989 (S.I. 1989/476)
- Pensions Increase (Review) Order 1989 (S.I. 1989/477)
- Local Authorities (Armorial Bearings) Order 1989 (S.I. 1989/478)
- Child Abduction and Custody (Parties to Conventions) Order 1989 (S.I. 1989/479)
- CSCE Information Forum (Immunities and Privileges) Order 1989 (S.I. 1989/480)
- Foreign Compensation (Financial Provisions) Order 1989 (S.I. 1989/481)
- Territorial Sea (Limits) Order 1989 (S.I. 1989/482)
- Social Security (Isle of Man) Order 1989 (S.I. 1989/483)
- Appropriation (Northern Ireland) Order 1989 (S.I. 1989/484)
- Drug Trafficking Offences Act 1986 (United States of America) Order 1989 (S.I. 1989/485)
- European Parliamentary Constituencies (England) (Miscellaneous Changes) Order 1989 (S.I. 1989/486)
- European Parliamentary Constituencies (Wales) (Miscellaneous Changes) Order 1989 (S.I. 1989/487)
- Immigration (Jersey) (Variation) Order 1989 (S.I. 1989/488)
- Interception of Communications Act 1985 (Isle of Man) Order 1989 (S.I. 1989/489)
- Laganside Development(Northern Ireland) Order 1989 (S.I. 1989/490)
- Local Elections (Variation of Limits of Candidates' Election Expenses) (Northern Ireland) Order 1989 (S.I. 1989/491)
- Nature Conservation and Amenity Lands (Amendment) (Northern Ireland) Order 1989 (S.I. 1989/492)
- Patents, Designs and Marks Act 1986 (Amendments to the Registered Designs Act 1949 and the Patents Act 1977) (Isle of Man) Order 1989 (S.I. 1989/493)
- European Parliamentary Constituencies (Scotland) (Miscellaneous Changes) Order 1989 (S.I. 1989/494)
- Transfer of Functions (Transport Tribunal) Order 1989 (S.I. 1989/495)
- General Medical Council (Constitution) Amendment Order 1989 (S.I. 1989/496)
- Registration of Births and Deaths (Amendment) Regulations 1989 (S.I. 1989/497)
- Personal and Occupational Pension Schemes (Miscellaneous Amendments) Regulations 1989 (S.I. 1989/500)

== 501–600 ==
- Education Reform Act 1988 (Commencement No. 6) Order 1989 (S.I. 1989/501)
- European Parliamentary Elections (Northern Ireland) (Amendment) Regulations 1989 (S.I. 1989/502)
- Access to Personal Files (Housing) Regulations 1989 (S.I. 1989/503)
- Testing of Poultry Flocks Order 1989 (S.I. 1989/504)
- Civil Legal Aid (Scotland) Amendment Regulations 1989 (S.I. 1989/505)
- Advice and Assistance (Scotland) Amendment Regulations 1989 (S.I. 1989/506)
- Community Charges (Deductions from Income Support) (Scotland) Regulations 1989 (S.I. 1989/507)
- Offshore Installations (Safety Zones) Order 1989 (S.I. 1989/508)
- Northern Ireland (Emergency Provisions) Acts 1978 and 1987 (Continuance) Order 1989 (S.I. 1989/509)
- Northern Ireland (Emergency Provisions) (Amendment) Regulations 1989 (S.I. 1989/510)
- Registration of Births and Deaths (Welsh Language) (Amendment) Regulations 1989 (S.I. 1989/511)
- Housing (Preservation of Right to Buy) (Amendment) Regulations 1989 (S.I. 1989/512)
- Housing (Right to Buy) (Maximum Discount) Order 1989 (S.I. 1989/513)
- National Health Service (Travelling Expenses and Remission of Charges) Amendment Regulations 1989 (S.I. 1989/517)
- M40 (London–Oxford) Motorway (Stokenchurch to Waterstock Crossroads Section) Variation Scheme 1989 (S.I. 1989/521)
- M40 London-Oxford-Birmingham Motorway (Waterstock to Wendlebury Section) and Connecting Roads Scheme 1989 (S.I. 1989/522)
- Social Security Benefit (Dependency) Amendment Regulations 1989 (S.I. 1989/523)
- Welfare Food Amendment Regulations 1989 (S.I. 1989/524)
- Workmen's Compensation (Supplementation) Amendment Scheme 1989 (S.I. 1989/525)
- Employment Protection (Variation of Limits) Order 1989 (S.I. 1989/526)
- Unfair Dismissal (Increase of Compensation Limit) Order 1989 (S.I. 1989/527)
- Unfair Dismissal (Increase of Limits of Basic and Special Awards) Order 1989 (S.I. 1989/528)
- Food Protection (Emergency Prohibitions) (Sea Fish) Order 1989 (S.I. 1989/529)
- Erskine Bridge Regulations 1989 (SI 1989/530)
- Redundancy Payments (Local Government) (Modification) (Amendment) Order 1989 (S.I. 1989/532)
- Preservatives in Food Regulations 1989 (S.I. 1989/533)
- Income Support (General) Amendment Regulations 1989 (S.I. 1989/534)
- Gaming Clubs (Hours and Charges) (Amendment) Regulations 1989 (S.I. 1989/535)
- Gaming Act (Variation of Monetary Limits) Order 1989 (S.I. 1989/536)
- Cod (Specified Sea Areas) (Prohibition of Fishing) (No. 2) Order 1989 (S.I. 1989/537)
- African Development Bank (Further Subscription to Capital Stock) Order 1989 (S.I. 1989/538)
- African Development Fund (Fifth Replenishment) Order 1989 (S.I. 1989/539)
- War Pensions (Miscellaneous Amendments) Order 1989 (S.I. 1989/540)
- Yorkshire Water Authority (Ryburn Valley Water Supply) Order 1989 (S.I. 1989/544)
- Motor Fuel (Lead Content of Petrol) (Amendment) Regulations 1989 (S.I. 1989/547)
- Civil Legal Aid (Matrimonial Proceedings) Regulations 1989 (S.I. 1989/549)
- Legal Advice and Assistance (Scope) Regulations 1989 (S.I. 1989/550)
- Legal Aid (Functions) Order 1989 (S.I. 1989/551)
- Pneumoconiosis etc. (Workers' Compensation) (Payment of Claims) (Amendment) Regulations 1989 (S.I. 1989/552)
- Plant Health (Great Britain) (Amendment) Order 1989 (S.I. 1989/553)
- Gipsy Encampments (Borough of Arfon) Order 1989 (S.I. 1989/555)
- Civil Evidence (Scotland) Act 1988 (Commencement) Order 1989 (S.I. 1989/556)
- A59 Samlesbury – Skipton Trunk Road (Improvement from East of Monk Bridge to West of Crooks House) Order 1989 (S.I. 1989/557)
- A59 Samlesbury-Skipton Trunk Road (Improvement from West of Yarlside Lane (B6251) to East of Monk Bridge) Order 1989 (S.I. 1989/558)
- Legal Advice and Assistance (Amendment) Regulations 1989 (S.I. 1989/560)
- Wireless Telegraphy (Control of Interference from Fluorescent Lighting Apparatus) (Amendment) Regulations 1989 (S.I. 1989/561)
- Wireless Telegraphy (Control of Interference from Household Appliances, Portable Tools etc.) (Amendment) Regulations 1989 (S.I. 1989/562)
- Combined Probation Areas (West Sussex) Order 1989 (S.I. 1989/563)
- Police Federation (Amendment) Regulations 1989 (S.I. 1989/564)
- Housing Benefit (General) Amendment No. 2 Regulations 1989 (S.I. 1989/566)
- Merchant Shipping (Loading and Stability Assessment of Ro/Ro Passenger Ships) (Non-United Kingdom Ships) Regulations 1989 (S.I. 1989/567)
- Merchant Shipping (Weighing of Goods Vehicles and other Cargo) (Application to non-UK Ships) Regulations 1989 (S.I. 1989/568)
- Social Security (Contributions) Amendment (No. 2) Regulations 1989 (S.I. 1989/571)
- Social Security (Contributions) Amendment (No. 3) Regulations 1989 (S.I. 1989/572)
- Coal Industry (Restructuring Grants) Order 1989 (S.I. 1989/573)
- Beef Special Premium (Protection of Payments) Order 1989 (S.I. 1989/574)
- Beef Special Premium (Recovery Powers) Regulations 1989 (S.I. 1989/575)
- Cereals Co-responsibility Levy (Amendment) Regulations 1989 (S.I. 1989/576)
- Town and Country Planning (Determination of Appeals by Appointed Persons) (Prescribed Classes) (Scotland) Amendment Regulations 1989 (S.I. 1989/577)
- Rent Officers (Additional Functions) (Scotland) Order 1989 (S.I. 1989/578)
- Preservatives in Food (Scotland) Regulations 1989 (S.I. 1989/581)
- Evidence in Divorce Actions (Scotland) Order 1989 (S.I. 1989/582)
- Medicines (Fees Relating to Medicinal Products for Animal Use) Regulations 1989 (S.I. 1989/583)
- Rent Officers (Additional Functions) Order 1989 (S.I. 1989/590)
- Consumer Credit (Cancellation Notices and Copies of Documents) (Amendment) Regulations 1989 (S.I. 1989/591)
- Consumer Credit (Total Charge for Credit and Rebate on Early Settlement) (Amendment) Regulations 1989 (S.I. 1989/596)
- Education (Listed Bodies) (Amendment) Order 1989 (S.I. 1989/597)
- Education (Recognised Awards) (Amendment) Order 1989 (S.I. 1989/598)
- British Railways Board (Vale of Rheidol) Light Railway (Amendment) Order 1989 (SI 1989/599)
- Gipsy Encampments (Borough of Dacorum) Order 1989 (S.I. 1989/600)

== 601–700 ==
- Gipsy Encampments (District of Welwyn Hatfield) Order 1989 (S.I. 1989/601)
- National Health Service (General Dental Services) (Scotland) Amendment Regulations 1989 (S.I. 1989/602)
- Town and Country Planning General Development (Amendment) Order 1989 (S.I. 1989/603)
- Wireless Telegraphy Apparatus (Low Power Devices) (Exemption) Regulations 1989 (S.I. 1989/604)
- Housing Benefit (Subsidy) Order 1989 (S.I. 1989/607)
- National Health Service (General Dental Services) Amendment Regulations 1989 (S.I. 1989/613)
- National Health Service (Travelling Expenses and Remission of Charges) Amendment (No. 2) Regulations 1989 (S.I. 1989/614)
- Road Traffic (Carriage of Explosives) Regulations 1989 (S.I. 1989/615)
- National Health Service (Travelling Expenses and Remission of Charges) (Scotland) Amendment (No.2) Regulations 1989 (S.I. 1989/616)
- A59 Samlesbury–Skipton Trunk Road (Improvement from Crooks House to Bentha Hill) Order 1989 (S.I. 1989/617)
- Food Protection (Emergency Prohibitions) (Sea Fish) (Revocation) Order 1989 (S.I. 1989/619)
- Measuring Instruments (EEC Requirements) (Fees) (Amendment) Regulations 1989 (S.I. 1989/620)
- Distress for Rates (Amendment) Order 1989 (S.I. 1989/621)
- Gaming Clubs (Hours and Charges) (Scotland) Amendment Regulations 1989 (S.I. 1989/622)
- Gaming Act (Variation of Monetary Limits) (Scotland) Order 1989 (S.I. 1989/623)
- Seed Potatoes (Fees) Regulations 1989 (S.I. 1989/632)
- European Parliamentary Elections (Amendment) Regulations 1989 (S.I. 1989/633)
- Representation of the People (Variation of Limits of Candidates' Election Expenses) Order 1989 (S.I. 1989/634)
- Electricity at Work Regulations 1989 (S.I. 1989/635)
- Merger Reference (Strong & Fisher, Hillsdown and Pittard Garnar) (Revocation) Order 1989 (S.I. 1989/636)
- Unitary Development Plans (Tyne and Wear) (Appointed Day) Order 1989 (S.I. 1989/637)
- European Economic Interest Grouping Regulations 1989 (S.I. 1989/638)
- Premium Savings Bonds (Amendment) Regulations 1989 (S.I. 1989/639)
- Pig Carcase (Grading) (Amendment) Regulations 1989 (S.I. 1989/644)
- New Street Byelaws (Extension of Operation) (Amendment) Order 1989 (S.I. 1989/645)
- National Savings Stock Register (Amendment) Regulations 1989 (S.I. 1989/652)
- A34 Winchester—Preston Trunk Road (Henley-In-Arden to Hockley Heath section) Trunking Order 1988S.I. 1989/653)
- (A4123) East of Birmingham–Birkenhead Trunk Road (De-Trunking at the Junction of Wolverhampton Road and Hagley Road West) Order 1989 (S.I. 1989/654)
- Food Protection (Emergency Prohibitions) Amendment Order 1989 (S.I. 1989/655)
- General Medical Council Preliminary Proceedings Committee and Professional Conduct Committee (Procedure) Rules (Amendment) Order of Council 1989 (S.I. 1989/656)
- A13 Trunk Road (Lakeside Link Road) Order 1989 (S.I. 1989/657)
- Food Protection (Emergency Prohibitions) (England) Amendment No. 2 Order 1989 (S.I. 1989/658)
- Export of Sheep (Prohibition) (No. 2) Amendment No. 2 Order 1989 (S.I. 1989/659)
- Food Protection (Emergency Prohibitions) (Wales) (No. 5) Amendment No. 2 Order 1989 (S.I. 1989/660)
- Processed Animal Protein Order 1989 (S.I. 1989/661)
- Merchant Shipping (Merchant Navy Reserve) Regulations 1989 (S.I. 1989/662)
- Teachers' Superannuation (Scotland) Amendment Regulations 1989 (S.I. 1989/666)
- Borough of Colwyn (Electoral Arrangements) Order 1989 (S.I. 1989/668)
- Air Navigation (General) (Third Amendment) Regulations 1989 (S.I. 1989/669)
- Town and Country Planning (Control of Advertisements) Regulations 1989 (S.I. 1989/670)
- Southern Sea Fisheries District Order 1989 (S.I. 1989/671)
- Health and Safety at Work etc. Act 1974 (Application outside Great Britain) (Variation) Order 1989 (S.I. 1989/672)
- Recognition of Trusts Act 1987 (Overseas Territories) Order 1989 (S.I. 1989/673)
- Criminal Justice Act 1987 (Guernsey) Order 1989 (S.I. 1989/674)
- Criminal Justice Act 1987 (Jersey) Order 1989 (S.I. 1989/675)
- Immigration (Guernsey) (Variation) Order 1989 (S.I. 1989/676)
- Matrimonial and Family Proceedings (Northern Ireland) Order 1989 (S.I. 1989/677)
- Matrimonial and Family Proceedings (Northern Ireland Consequential Amendment) Order 1989 (S.I. 1989/678)
- Merchant Shipping Act 1988 (Isle of Man) Order 1989 (S.I. 1989/679)
- Motor Vehicles (Wearing of Rear Seat Belts by Children) (Northern Ireland) Order 1989 (S.I. 1989/680)
- Lord Chancellor's Salary Order 1989 (S.I. 1989/681)
- Health and Safety Information for Employees Regulations 1989 (S.I. 1989/682)
- Local Government (Allowances) (Amendment) Regulations 1989 (S.I. 1989/683)
- Medicines (Fixing of Fees Relating to Medicinal Products for Human Use) Order 1989 (S.I. 1989/684)
- Assured Tenancies (Rent Information) (Scotland) Order 1989 (S.I. 1989/685)
- Sea Fish (Marketing Standards) (Amendment) Regulations 1989 (S.I. 1989/687)
- Pilotage Authorities (1988 Returns) Order 1988S.I. 1989/689)
- Gaming (Bingo) Act (Fees) (Amendment) Order 1989 (S.I. 1989/693)
- National Police Records (Recordable Offences) (Amendment) Regulations 1989 (S.I. 1989/694)

== 701–800 ==
- Meters (Certification) (Fees) Regulations 1989 (S.I. 1989/701)
- Police Cadets (Scotland) Amendment Regulations 1989 (S.I. 1989/702)
- Pensions Increase (Approved Schemes) (National Health Service) Amendment Regulations 1989 (S.I. 1989/711)
- Community Charges (Administration and Enforcement) (Amendment) Regulations 1989 (S.I. 1989/712)
- Motorcycles (Sound Level Measurement Certificates) (Amendment) Regulations 1989 (S.I. 1989/713)
- Woolwich Ferry Order 1989 (S.I. 1989/714)
- Anglian Water Authority (West Drain Discharge) Order 1989 (S.I. 1989/716)
- Gipsy Encampments (Borough of Dacorum) (No. 2) Order 1989 (S.I. 1989/717)
- Education Reform Act 1988 (Commencement No. 7) Order 1989 (S.I. 1989/719)
- Civil Legal Aid (Financial Conditions) (Scotland) Regulations 1989 (S.I. 1989/720)
- Advice and Assistance (Financial Conditions) (Scotland) Regulations 1989 (S.I. 1989/721)
- Southern Water Authority 1989 (S.I. 1989/722)
- Low Voltage Electrical Equipment (Safety) Regulations 1989 (S.I. 1989/728)
- Building Societies (Money Transmission Services) Order 1989 (S.I. 1989/730)
- Firemen's Pension Scheme (Amendment) Order 1989 (S.I. 1989/731)
- Firemen's Pension Scheme (Amendment) (No. 2) Order 1989 (S.I. 1989/732)
- Police Pensions (Amendment) Regulations 1989 (S.I. 1989/733)
- Liverpool–Leeds–Hull Trunk Road (Howden Bypass) (Revocation) Order 1989 (S.I. 1989/734)
- Community Charges (Notification of Deaths) (Scotland) Amendment Regulations 1989 (S.I. 1989/735)
- Education (Grant) (St. Augustine's School) Regulations 1989 (S.I. 1989/736)
- Returning Officers' Expenses (Amendment) Regulations 1989 (S.I. 1989/741)
- Local Government Reorganisation (Property)(West Yorkshire) Order 1989 (S.I. 1989/743)
- Removal, Storage and Disposal of Vehicles (Prescribed Sums and Charges etc.) Regulations 1989 (S.I. 1989/744)
- Vehicles (Charges for Release from Immobilisation Devices) Regulations 1989 (S.I. 1989/745)
- A38 Trunk Road (Marsh Mills Junction Improvement) Order 1989 (S.I. 1989/746)
- A38 Trunk Road (Marsh Mills Junction Improvement) (Detrunking) Order 1989 (S.I. 1989/747)
- Submarine Pipe-lines (Designated Owners) (No. 3) Order 1989 (S.I. 1989/751)
- Submarine Pipe-lines (Designated Owners) (No. 4) Order 1989 (S.I. 1989/752)
- Submarine Pipe-lines (Designated Owners) (No.5) Order 1989 (S.I. 1989/753)
- Submarine Pipe-lines (Designated Owners) (No.6) Order 1989 (S.I. 1989/754)
- Submarine Pipe-lines (Designated Owners) (No. 7) Order 1989 (S.I. 1989/755)
- Submarine Pipe-lines (Designated Owners) (No. 8) Order 1989 (S.I. 1989/756)
- Submarine Pipe-lines (Designated Owners) (No. 9) Order 1989 (S.I. 1989/757)
- Submarine Pipe-lines (Designated Owners) (No. 10) Order 1989 (S.I. 1989/758)
- Submarine Pipe-lines (Designated Owners) (No. 11) Order 1989 (S.I. 1989/759)
- Motor Vehicles (Driving Licences) (Amendment) (No. 2) Regulations 1989 (S.I. 1989/762)
- Prosecution of Offences (Custody Time Limits) (Amendment) Regulations 1989 (S.I. 1989/767)
- Food Labelling (Amendment) Regulations 1989 (S.I. 1989/768)
- Port of London Authority Harbour Revision Order 1989 (S.I. 1989/774)
- Medway Ports Authority Harbour Revision Order 1989 (S.I. 1989/775)
- Blood Tests (Evidence of Paternity) (Amendment) Regulations 1989 (S.I. 1989/776)
- Act of Sederunt (Shorthand Writers' Fees) 1989 (S.I. 1989/777)
- Act of Sederunt (Rules of the Court of Session Amendment No.3) (Shorthand Writers' Fees) 1989 (S.I. 1989/778)
- General Optical Council Contact Lens (Specification) Rules Order of Council 1989 (S.I. 1989/791)

== 801–900 ==
- Land Registration Rules 1989 (S.I. 1989/801)
- Local Government Superannuation (Scotland) Amendment Regulations 1989 (S.I. 1989/802)
- National Health Service (Superannuation) Amendment Regulations 1989 (S.I. 1989/804)
- Social Security Revaluation of Earnings Factors Order 1989 (S.I. 1989/805)
- National Health Service (Superannuation) (Scotland) Amendment Regulations 1989 (S.I. 1989/807)
- Teachers' Superannuation (Scotland) Amendment (No.2) Regulations 1989 (S.I. 1989/808)
- Food Labelling (Scotland) Amendment Regulations 1989 (S.I. 1989/809)
- Teachers' Superannuation (Amendment) (No. 2) Regulations 1989 (S.I. 1989/811)
- South Yorkshire Residuary Body (Winding Up) Order 1989 (S.I. 1989/814)
- Copyright, Designs and Patents Act 1988 (Commencement No. 1) Order 1989 (S.I. 1989/816)
- A282 Trunk Road Dartford–Thurrock Approach Roads London Road (Slip Road) Order 1989 (S.I. 1989/817)
- Yorkshire Water Authority (East Ness Boreholes) Order 1989 (S.I. 1989/818)
- Plant Health (Forestry) (Great Britain) Order 1989 (S.I. 1989/823)
- British Steel Act 1988 (Government Shareholding) Order 1989 (S.I. 1989/824)
- Education (National Curriculum) (Modern Foreign Languages) Order 1989 (S.I. 1989/825)
- Health and Medicines Act 1988 (Commencement No. 4) Order 1989 (S.I. 1989/826)
- Pensions (Miscellaneous Offices) (Requisite Benefits) (Amendment) Order 1989 (S.I. 1989/829)
- Royal Botanic Garden, Edinburgh Regulations 1989 (S.I. 1989/830)
- National Health Service (General Dental Services) Amendment (No. 2) Regulations 1989 (S.I. 1989/832)
- Bure Valley Railway Light Railway Order 1989 (S.I. 1989/835)
- Tetrachloroethylene in Olive Oil (Scotland) Regulations 1989 (S.I. 1989/837)
- Building Societies (Provision of Services) Order 1989 (S.I. 1989/839)
- Health and Safety at Work etc. Act 1974 (Application outside Great Britain) Order 1989 (S.I. 1989/840)
- Antarctic Treaty (Amendment) Order 1989 (S.I. 1989/841)
- British Antarctic Territory Order 1989 (S.I. 1989/842)
- Child Abduction and Custody (Parties to Conventions) (Amendment) Order 1989 (S.I. 1989/843)
- Consular Fees (Amendment) Order 1989 (S.I. 1989/844)
- Merchant Shipping (Confirmation of Legislation) (Falkland Islands) Order 1989 (S.I. 1989/845)
- Food (Northern Ireland) Order 1989 (S.I. 1989/846)
- Immigration (Isle of Man) (Variation) Order 1989 (S.I. 1989/847)
- London Cab Order 1989 (S.I. 1989/848)
- National Health Service (General Dental Services) (Scotland) Amendment (No.2) Regulations 1989 (S.I. 1989/851)
- Firearms (Amendment) Act 1988 (Commencement No. 2) Order 1989 (S.I. 1989/853)
- Firearms Rules 1989 (S.I. 1989/854)
- Orkney Islands Council Harbour Revision Order 1989 (S.I. 1989/860)
- Borough of Preston (Electoral Arrangements) Order 1989 (S.I. 1989/861)
- Submarine Pipe-lines (Designated Owners) (No. 12) Order 1989 (S.I. 1989/862)
- Submarine Pipe-lines (Designated Owners) (No. 13) Order 1989 (S.I. 1989/863)
- Submarine Pipe-lines (Designated Owners) (No. 14) Order 1989 (S.I. 1989/864)
- Submarine Pipe-lines (Designated Owners) (No. 15) Order 1989 (S.I. 1989/865)
- Submarine Pipe-lines (Designated Owners) (No. 16) Order 1989 (S.I. 1989/866)
- Submarine Pipe-lines (Designated Owners) (No. 17) Order 1989 (S.I. 1989/867)
- Submarine Pipe-lines (Designated Owners) (No. 18) Order 1989 (S.I. 1989/868)
- Consumer Credit (Exempt Agreements) Order 1989 (S.I. 1989/869)
- Police (Common Police Services) (Scotland) Order 1989 (S.I. 1989/870)
- Legal Aid (Functions) (No. 2) Order 1989 (S.I. 1989/871)
- Social Security (Unemployment, Sickness and Invalidity Benefit) Amendment Regulations 1989 (S.I. 1989/872)
- Blyth Harbour Revision Order 1989 (S.I. 1989/874)
- Yarmouth (Isle of Wight) Harbour Revision Order 1989 (S.I. 1989/875)
- Emulsifiers and Stabilisers in Food Regulations 1989 (S.I. 1989/876)
- Tuberculosis (Deer) Order 1989 (S.I. 1989/878)
- Movement of Animals (Records) (Amendment) Order 1989 (S.I. 1989/879)
- Stock Transfer (Gilt-edged Securities) (Exempt Transfer) Regulations 1989 (S.I. 1989/880)
- County Court (Forms) (Amendment) Rules 1989 (S.I. 1989/886)
- Offshore Installations (Safety Zones) (No. 2) Order 1989 (S.I. 1989/887)
- Smoke Control Areas (Exempted Fireplaces) (Scotland) Order 1989 (S.I. 1989/888)
- Firearms (Scotland) Rules 1989 (S.I. 1989/889)
- Parliamentary and other Pensions Act 1987 (Commencement No. 2) Order 1989 (S.I. 1989/892)
- Social Security Miscellaneous Provisions Regulations 1989 (S.I. 1989/893)
- Police (Amendment) Regulations 1989 (S.I. 1989/895)
- Folkestone-Honiton Trunk Road (A27) (Windhover Roundabout to Southampton City Boundary and Park Gate Link Detrunking) Order 1989 (S.I. 1989/897)
- Patents (Fees) Rules 1989 (S.I. 1989/899)
- Birmingham Assay Office Order 1989 (S.I. 1989/900)

== 901–1000 ==
- Education (Modification of Enactments Relating to Employment) Order 1989 (S.I. 1989/901)
- Poultry Laying Flocks (Collection and Handling of Eggs and Control of Vermin) Order 1989 (S.I. 1989/902)
- Trade Marks and Service Marks (Fees) Rules 1989 (S.I. 1989/903)
- Education (School Teachers' Pay and Conditions) Order 1989 (S.I. 1989/904)
- Wildlife and Countryside Act 1981 (Variation of Schedule) Order 1989 (S.I. 1989/906)
- Education (National Curriculum) (Attainment Targets and Programmes of Study in English) Order 1989 (S.I. 1989/907)
- Income Tax (Interest Relief) (Qualifying Lenders) Order 1989 (S.I. 1989/908)
- Register of Sasines (Microcopies) (Scotland) Regulations 1989 (S.I. 1989/909)
- Tetrachloroethylene in Olive Oil Regulations 1989 (S.I. 1989/910)
- Civil Courts (Amendment No. 3) Order 1989 (S.I. 1989/914)
- Wine and Made-wine of a Strength exceeding 1.2 per cent. and not exceeding 5.5 per cent. (Prohibition of Fortification) Regulations 1989 (S.I. 1989/916)
- Undersized Velvet Crabs Order 1989 (S.I. 1989/919)
- Motor Vehicles (Tests) (Amendment) (No. 2) Regulations 1989 (S.I. 1989/920)
- Financial Services (Disclosure of Information) (Designated Authorities) (No.5) Order 1989 (S.I. 1989/940)
- Wireless Telegraphy Apparatus (Citizens' Band European Users) (Exemption) Regulations 1989 (S.I. 1989/943)
- Capital Gains Tax (Gilt-edged Securities) Order 1989 (S.I. 1989/944)
- Emulsifiers and Stabilisers in Food (Scotland) Regulations 1989 (S.I. 1989/945)
- Teachers' Superannuation (Additional Voluntary Contributions) Regulations 1989 (S.I. 1989/946)
- Boards for Special Hospitals (Abolition) Order 1989 (S.I. 1989/947)
- Special Hospitals Service Authority (Establishment and Constitution) Order 1989 (S.I. 1989/948)
- Special Hospitals Service Authority (Functions and Membership) Regulations 1989 (S.I. 1989/949)
- European Economic Interest Grouping (Fees) Regulations 1989 (S.I. 1989/950)
- Local Land Charges (Amendment) Rules 1989 (S.I. 1989/951)
- Education (School Curriculum and Related Information) Regulations 1989 (S.I. 1989/954)
- Copyright, Designs and Patents Act 1988 (Commencement No. 2) Order 1989 (S.I. 1989/955)
- Home Purchase Assistance (Recognised Lending Institutions) Order 1989 (S.I. 1989/956)
- Mortgage Indemnities (Recognised Bodies) Order 1989 (S.I. 1989/957)
- Housing (Right to Buy) (Priority of Charges) Order 1989 (S.I. 1989/958)
- Value Added Tax (Cars) (Amendment) Order 1989 (S.I. 1989/959)
- Local Government Superannuation (Scotland) Amendment (No.2) Regulations 1989 (S.I. 1989/967)
- Erskine Bridge Tolls Order 1989 (SI 1989/968)
- Medicines (Products Other Than Veterinary Drugs) (General Sale List) Amendment Order 1989 (S.I. 1989/969)
- Magistrates' Courts (Remands in Custody) Order 1989 (S.I. 1989/970)
- Offshore Installations (Safety Representatives and Safety Committees) Regulations 1989 (S.I. 1989/971)
- Housing Benefit (Community Charge Rebates) (Scotland) Amendment (No. 2) Regulations 1989 (S.I. 1989/972)
- Kidderminster–Halesowen Principal Road (A456) Trunking Order 1989 (S.I. 1989/973)
- Local Government Reorganisation (Merseyside County Archives etc.) Order 1989 (S.I. 1989/974)
- Valuation Timetable (Scotland) Amendment Order 1989 (S.I. 1989/976)
- Industrial Training Levy (Clothing and Allied Products) Order 1989 (S.I. 1989/977)
- Offshore Installations (Included Apparatus or Works) Order 1989 (S.I. 1989/978)
- Transfer of Functions (Rag Flock and Other Filling Materials) Order 1989 (S.I. 1989/979)
- Child Abduction and Custody (Parties to Conventions) (Amendment) (No.2) Order 1989 (S.I. 1989/980)
- Copyright, Designs and Patents Act 1988 (Isle of Man) Order 1989 (S.I. 1989/981)
- Registered Designs Act 1949 (Isle of Man) Order 1989 (S.I. 1989/982)
- Criminal Justice Act 1988 (Torture) (Isle of Man) Order 1989 (S.I. 1989/983)
- Financial Provisions (Northern Ireland) Order 1989 (S.I. 1989/984)
- Summer Time Order 1989 (S.I. 1989/985)
- Double Taxation Relief (Taxes on Estates of Deceased Persons and Inheritances and on Gifts) (Sweden) Order 1989 (S.I. 1989/986)
- Reciprocal Enforcement of Foreign Judgments (Canada) (Amendment) Order 1989 (S.I. 1989/987)
- Copyright (Application to Other Countries) Order 1989 (S.I. 1989/988)
- Copyright (International Organisations) Order 1989 (S.I. 1989/989)
- Design Right (Reciprocal Protection) Order 1989 (S.I. 1989/990)
- Performances (Reciprocal Protection) (Convention Countries) Order 1989 (S.I. 1989/991)
- Transfer of Functions (Economic Statistics) Order 1989 (S.I. 1989/992)
- Motor Vehicles (International Circulation) (Amendment) Order 1989 (S.I. 1989/993)
- Royal Air Force Terms of Service (Amendment) Regulations 1989 (S.I. 1989/994)
- European Parliamentary Elections (Returning Officers' Expenses) Regulations 1989 (S.I. 1989/995)
- European Parliamentary Elections (Returning Officers' Expenses) (Northern Ireland) Regulations 1989 (S.I. 1989/996)
- London-Penzance Trunk Road A30 (Zelah Bypass and Slip Roads) Order 1989 (S.I. 1989/997)
- Estate Duty (Interest on Unpaid Duty) Order 1989 (S.I. 1989/998)
- Estate Duty (Northern Ireland) (Interest on Unpaid Duty) Order 1989 (S.I. 1989/999)
- Income Tax (Interest on Unpaid Tax and Repayment Supplement) Order 1989 (S.I. 1989/1000)

== 1001–1100 ==
- Income Tax (Official Rate of Interest on Beneficial Loans) Order 1989 (S.I. 1989/1001)
- Inheritance Tax and Capital Transfer Tax (Interest on Unpaid Tax) Order 1989 (S.I. 1989/1002)
- Stamp Duty Reserve Tax (Interest on Tax Repaid) Order 1989 (S.I. 1989/1003)
- Standard and Collective Community Charges (Scotland) Amendment Regulations 1989 (S.I. 1989/1004)
- Immigration (Variation of Leave) (Amendment) Order 1989 (S.I. 1989/1005)
- Copyright and Rights in Performances (Notice of Seizure) Order 1989 (S.I. 1989/1006)
- Copyright (Copying by Librarians and Archivists) Regulations 1989 (S.I. 1989/1009)
- Copyright (Recording for Archives of Designated Class of Broadcasts and Cable Programmes) (Designated Bodies) Order 1989 (S.I. 1989/1011)
- Copyright (Recordings of Folksongs for Archives) (Designated Bodies) Order 1989 (S.I. 1989/1012)
- Copyright (Sub-titling of Broadcasts and Cable Programmes) (Designated Body) Order 1989 (S.I. 1989/1013)
- Motor Vehicles (Designation of Approval Marks) (Amendment) Regulations 1989 (S.I. 1989/1014)
- Plant Health (Great Britain) (Amendment) (No. 2) Order 1989 (S.I. 1989/1016)
- Housing Benefit (General) Amendment No. 3 Regulations 1989 (S.I. 1989/1017)
- Act of Sederunt (Fees of Sheriff Officers) 1989 (S.I. 1989/1018)
- Act of Sederunt (Fees of Messengers-at-Arms) 1989 (S.I. 1989/1019)
- Act of Adjournal (Consolidation Amendment No.2) (Forms of Warrant for Execution and Charge for Payment of Fine or Other Financial Penalty) 1989 (S.I. 1989/1020)
- Matrimonial Causes (Costs) (Amendment No. 2) Rules 1989 (S.I. 1989/1021)
- National Maritime Museum Act 1989 (Commencement) Order 1989 (S.I. 1989/1028)
- Offshore Installations (Emergency Pipe-line Valve) Regulations 1989 (S.I. 1989/1029 – (guidance notes in support of SI 1989/1029 issued Nov 1990))
- Pensions (Miscellaneous Offices) (Preservation of Benefits) (Amendment) Order 1989 (S.I. 1989/1030)
- Copyright, Designs and Patents Act 1988 (Commencement No. 3) Order 1989 (S.I. 1989/1032)
- Family Credit and Income Support (General) Amendment Regulations 1989 (S.I. 1989/1034)
- Self-Propelled Industrial Trucks (EEC Requirements) (Amendment) Regulations 1989 (S.I. 1989/1035)
- Health and Safety (Training for Employment) (Amendment) Regulations 1989 (S.I. 1989/1039)
- Education (Inner London Education Authority) (Continuity and Offers of Employment) Order 1989 (S.I. 1989/1040)
- Set-Aside (Amendment) Regulations 1989 (S.I. 1989/1042)
- Merger Reference (Coats Viyella plc and Tootal Group plc) Order 1989 (S.I. 1989/1054)
- Lerwick Harbour Revision Order 1989 (S.I. 1989/1055)
- Medicines (Veterinary Drugs) (Pharmacy and Merchants' List) Order 1989 (S.I. 1989/1056)
- Community Charges (Miscellaneous Provisions) Regulations 1989 (S.I. 1989/1057)
- Non-Domestic Rating (Collection and Enforcement) (Local Lists) Regulations 1989 (S.I. 1989/1058)
- Non-Domestic Rating (Discretionary Relief) Regulations 1989 (S.I. 1989/1059)
- Non-Domestic Rating (Miscellaneous Provisions) Regulations 1989 (S.I. 1989/1060)
- Unichem Limited (Allotment of Shares) Order 1989 (S.I. 1989/1061)
- Public Service Vehicles (Registration of Local Services) (Amendment) Regulations 1989 (S.I. 1989/1064)
- Unitary Development Plans (West Yorkshire) (Appointed Day) Order 1989 (S.I. 1989/1065)
- Sandeels Licensing Order 1989 (S.I. 1989/1066)
- Copyright (Application of Provisions relating to Educational Establishments to Teachers) (No. 2) Order 1989 (S.I. 1989/1067)
- Copyright (Educational Establishments) (No. 2) Order 1989 (S.I. 1989/1068)
- Copyright (Copying by Librarians and Archivists) (Amendment) Regulations 1989 (S.I. 1989/1069)
- Copyright (Industrial Process and Excluded Articles)(No. 2) Order 1989 (S.I. 1989/1070)
- Public Telecommunication System Designation (East Lancashire Cablevision Limited) Order 1989 (S.I. 1989/1076)
- Petty Sessional Divisions (Harrow) Order 1989 (S.I. 1989/1077)
- Inheritance Tax (Delivery of Accounts) Regulations 1989 (S.I. 1989/1078)
- Inheritance Tax (Delivery of Accounts) (Scotland) Regulations 1989 (S.I. 1989/1079)
- Inheritance Tax (Delivery of Accounts) (Northern Ireland) Regulations 1989 (S.I. 1989/1080)
- Restrictive Trade Practices (Sale and Purchase and Share Subscription Agreements) (Goods) Order 1989 (S.I. 1989/1081)
- Restrictive Trade Practices (Services) (Amendment) Order 1989 (S.I. 1989/1082)
- Building Societies Act 1986 (Commencement No. 2) Order 1989 (S.I. 1989/1083)
- Home-Grown Cereals Authority (Rate of Levy) Order 1989 (S.I. 1989/1084)
- Criminal Justice Act 1988 (Commencement No. 8) Order 1989 (S.I. 1989/1085)
- Road Traffic Act 1988 (Appointed Day for Section 15) Order 1989 (S.I. 1989/1086)
- Town and Country Planning (Determination of Appeals by Appointed Persons)(Amendment) Regulations 1989 (S.I. 1989/1087)
- Customs Duties (ECSC) (Amendment No. 4) Order 1989 (S.I. 1989/1088)
- Unitary Development Plans (Greater London and Dudley) (Appointed Day) Order 1989 (S.I. 1989/1089)
- Elected Authorities (Northern Ireland) Act 1989 (Commencement No. 1) Order 1989 (S.I. 1989/1093)
- Roads (Scotland) Act 1984 (Commencement No.2) Order 1989 (S.I. 1989/1094)
- Road Humps (Scotland) Regulations 1989 (S.I. 1989/1095)
- Northern Ireland Act 1974 (Interim Period Extension) Order 1989 (S.I. 1989/1096)
- Outer Space Act 1986 (Commencement) Order 1989 (S.I. 1989/1097)
- Copyright (Material Open to Public Inspection) (International Organisations) Order 1989 (S.I. 1989/1098)
- Copyright (Material Open to Public Inspection) (Marking of Copies of Maps) Order 1989 (S.I. 1989/1099)
- Design Right (Semiconductor Topographies) Regulations 1989 (S.I. 1989/1100)

== 1101–1200 ==
- London Government Reorganisation (Property) Order 1989 (S.I. 1989/1101)
- Criminal Appeal (Amendment) Rules 1989 (S.I. 1989/1102)
- Crown Court (Amendment) (No. 2) Rules 1989 (S.I. 1989/1103)
- Registered Designs Rules 1989 (S.I. 1989/1105)
- Boston Fishery Orders (Continuation) Order 1989 (S.I. 1989/1106)
- Prosecution of Offences (Custody Time Limits) (Amendment) (No. 2) Regulations 1989 (S.I. 1989/1107)
- Dock Work (Compensation Payments Scheme) Regulations 1989 (S.I. 1989/1111)
- Students' Allowances (Scotland) Amendment Regulations 1989 (S.I. 1989/1112)
- Education Authority Bursaries (Scotland) Amendment Regulations 1989 (S.I. 1989/1113)
- Value Added Tax (Water) Order 1989 (S.I. 1989/1114)
- Personal Pension Schemes (Transfer Payments) (Amendment) Regulations 1989 (S.I. 1989/1115)
- Patents (Amendment) Rules 1989 (S.I. 1989/1116)
- Trade Marks and Service Marks (Amendment) Rules 1989 (S.I. 1989/1117)
- Building (Amendment of Prescribed Fees) Regulations 1989 (S.I. 1989/1118)
- Building Regulations (Amendment) Regulations 1989 (S.I. 1989/1119)
- Local Authorities' Traffic Orders (Procedure) (England and Wales) Regulations 1989 (S.I. 1989/1120)
- Consumer Credit (Advertisements) Regulations 1989 (S.I. 1989/1125)
- Consumer Credit (Quotations) Regulations 1989 (S.I. 1989/1126)
- Construction Plant and Equipment (Harmonization of Noise Emission Standards) (Amendment) Regulations 1989 (S.I. 1989/1127)
- Consumer Credit Act 1974 (Commencement No. 10) Order 1989 (S.I. 1989/1128)
- Copyright Tribunal Rules 1989 (S.I. 1989/1129)
- Design Right (Proceedings before Comptroller) Rules 1989 (S.I. 1989/1130)
- Registered Designs (Fees) Rules 1989 (S.I. 1989/1131)
- Value Added Tax (General) (Amendment) Regulations 1989 (S.I. 1989/1132)
- Education (Assisted Places) (Scotland) Regulations 1989 (S.I. 1989/1133)
- St Mary's Music School (Aided Places) Regulations 1989 (S.I. 1989/1134)
- Education (Inner London Education Authority) (Transitional and Supplementary Provisions) (No. 2) Order 1989 (S.I. 1989/1135)
- Education (School Curriculum and Related Information) (Amendment) Regulations 1989 (S.I. 1989/1136)
- Education (Reorganisation in Inner London) (Compensation) Regulations 1989 (S.I. 1989/1139)
- Non-Contentious Probate Fees (Amendment) Order 1989 (S.I. 1989/1140)
- Health and Safety (Miscellaneous Modifications) Regulations 1989 (S.I. 1989/1141)
- Water Act 1989 (Commencement No. 1) Order 1989 (S.I. 1989/1146)
- Water Supply (Water Quality) Regulations 1989 S.I. 1989/1147)
- Surface Waters (Classification) Regulations 1989 (S.I. 1989/1148)
- Controlled Waters (Lakes and Ponds) Order 1989 (S.I. 1989/1149)
- Control of Pollution (Revocations) Regulations 1989 (S.I. 1989/1150)
- Control of Pollution (Consents for Discharges etc.) (Secretary of State Functions) Regulations 1989 (S.I. 1989/1151)
- Water and Sewerage (Conservation, Access and Recreation) (Code of Practice) Order 1989 (S.I. 1989/1152)
- Director General of Water Services' Register (Inspection and Charges) Order 1989 (S.I. 1989/1154)
- Water Reorganisation (Pensions etc.) (Designated Persons) Order 1989 (S.I. 1989/1155)
- Trade Effluents (Prescribed Processes and Substances) Regulations 1989 (S.I. 1989/1156)
- Control of Pollution (Discharges by the National Rivers Authority) Regulations 1989 (S.I. 1989/1157)
- Control of Pollution (Radioactive Waste) Regulations 1989 (S.I. 1989/1158)
- Water Supply and Sewerage Services (Customer Service Standards) Regulations 1989 (S.I. 1989/1159)
- Control of Pollution (Registers) Regulations 1989 (S.I. 1989/1160)
- Water Reorganisation (Pensions etc.) Regulations 1989 (S.I. 1989/1161)
- Water Appointment (Monopolies and Mergers Commission) Regulations 1989 (S.I. 1989/1162)
- Public Telecommunication System Designation (Andover Cablevision Limited) Order 1989 (S.I. 1989/1163)
- Merchant Shipping (Accident Investigation)Regulations 1989 (S.I. 1989/1172)
- Agricultural Wages Committees (Cleveland, Durham, Northumberland and Tyne and Wear) Order 1989 (S.I. 1989/1173)
- Health and Medicines Act 1988 (Commencement No. 5) Order 1989 (S.I. 1989/1174)
- National Health Service (General Ophthalmic Services) Amendment (No. 2) Regulations 1989 (S.I. 1989/1175)
- Sight Testing (Examination and Prescription) Regulations 1989 (S.I. 1989/1176)
- National Health Service (General Ophthalmic Services) (Scotland) Amendment (No.2) Regulations 1989 (S.I. 1989/1177)
- Copyright (Customs) Regulations 1989 (S.I. 1989/1178)
- Town and Country Planning (Cardiff Bay Urban Development Area) Special Development Order 1989 (S.I. 1989/1180)
- Education (National Curriculum) (Temporary Exceptions for Individual Pupils) Regulations 1989 (S.I. 1989/1181)
- Police (Grant) (Amendment) Order 1989 (S.I. 1989/1182)
- Medicines (Data Sheet and Labelling) Amendment Regulations 1989 (S.I. 1989/1183)
- Medicines (Exemption from Licences) (Special and Transitional Cases) Amendment Order 1989 (S.I. 1989/1184)
- International Carriage of Perishable Foodstuffs (Amendment) Regulations 1989 (S.I. 1989/1185)
- Reservoirs (Panels of Civil Engineers) (Reappointment) Regulations 1989 (S.I. 1989/1186)
- Fisheries Act 1981 (Amendment) Regulations 1989 (S.I. 1989/1190)
- Hospital Complaints Procedure Act 1985 (Commencement) Order 1989 (S.I. 1989/1191)
- A6 London–Inverness Trunk Road (Barton Seagrave to West of Kettering) Detrunking Order 1989 (S.I. 1989/1197)
- A6 London–Inverness Trunk Road (Kettering Southern Bypass Slip Roads) Order 1989 (S.I. 1989/1198)
- Cereals Marketing Act (Application to Oilseeds) Order 1989 (S.I. 1989/1200)

== 1201–1300 ==
- Redundant Mineworkers and Concessionary Coal (Payments Schemes) (Amendment) Order 1989 (S.I. 1989/1201)
- Patents (Licences of Right) (Exception of Pesticidal Use) Order 1989 (S.I. 1989/1202)
- Social Security (Industrial Injuries) (Prescribed Diseases) Amendment Regulations 1989 (S.I. 1989/1207)
- Act of Sederunt (Registration Appeal Court) 1989 (S.I. 1989/1208)
- Copyright (Librarians and Archivists) (Copying of Copyright Material) Regulations 1989 (S.I. 1989/1212)
- Berkshire, Dorset and Wiltshire (County Boundaries) Order 1989 (S.I. 1989/1213)
- Lotteries (Variation of Monetary Limits) (Scotland) Order 1989 (S.I. 1989/1214)
- South West Water Authority (Whitford Bridge Treatment Works) Order 1989 (S.I. 1989/1215)
- Value Added Tax (Refund of Tax) Order 1989 (S.I. 1989/1217)
- Lotteries (Variation of Monetary Limits) Order 1989 (S.I. 1989/1218)
- Motor Vehicles (Wearing of Seat Belts by Children in Rear Seats) Regulations 1989 (S.I. 1989/1219)
- Recovery Vehicles (Number of Vehicles Recovered)Order 1989 (S.I. 1989/1226)
- Recovery Vehicles (Number of Vehicles Recovered) Order (Northern Ireland) 1989 (S.I. 1989/1227)
- Air Navigation (Restriction of Flying) (Molesworth Aerodrome) (Revocation) Regulations 1989 (S.I. 1989/1228)
- Health and Medicines Act 1988 (Commencement No. 6) Order 1989 (S.I. 1989/1229)
- Sight Testing (Examination and Prescription) (No. 2) Regulations 1989 (S.I. 1989/1230)
- Warrington and Runcorn Development Corporation (Transfer of Property and Dissolution) Order 1989 (S.I. 1989/1231)
- Telecommunications Act 1984 (Extension of Relevant Period) (No. 2) Order 1989 (S.I. 1989/1232)
- Education (Abolition of Corporal Punishment) (Independent Schools) (Amendment) Regulations 1989 (S.I. 1989/1233)
- Rate Support Grant (Scotland) Order 1989 (S.I. 1989/1234)
- Education (Assisted Places) Regulations 1989 (S.I. 1989/1235)
- Education (Grants) (Music and Ballet Schools) Regulations 1989 (S.I. 1989/1236)
- Education (Assisted Places) (Incidental Expenses) Regulations 1989 (S.I. 1989/1237)
- Social Security Act 1989 (Commencement No. 1) Order 1989 (S.I. 1989/1238)
- Occupational Pension Schemes (Transitional Provisions and Savings) Regulations 1989 (S.I. 1989/1239)
- Monopolies and Mergers Commission (Increase in Membership) Order 1989 (S.I. 1989/1240)
- Ecclesiastical Judges and Legal Officers (Fees) Order 1989 (S.I. 1989/1242)
- Faculty Jurisdiction (Amendment) Rules 1989 (S.I. 1989/1243)
- Legal Officers (Annual Fees) Order 1989 (S.I. 1989/1244)
- Parochial Fees Order 1989 (S.I. 1989/1245)
- Housing Action Trust Areas (Tenant Notification)Regulations 1989 (S.I. 1989/1246)
- Road Traffic Act 1988 (Appointed Day for Section 15) (No. 2) Order 1989 (S.I. 1989/1260)
- Education (School Records) Regulations 1989 (S.I. 1989/1261)
- Social Security Act 1989 (Commencement No. 2) Order 1989 (S.I. 1989/1262)
- Sludge (Use in Agriculture) Regulations 1989 (S.I. 1989/1263)
- Buckinghamshire County Council Fenny Stratford Southern Bypass (Canal Bridge) Scheme 1987 Confirmation Instrument 1989 (S.I. 1989/1264)
- Export of Goods (Control) (Amendment No.4) Order 1989 (S.I. 1989/1270)
- Toys (Safety) Regulations 1989 (S.I. 1989/1275)
- Banks (Administration Proceedings) Order 1989 (S.I. 1989/1276)
- Education (School Premises) (Amendment) Regulations 1989 (S.I. 1989/1277)
- Scholarships and Other Benefits (Amendment) Regulations 1989 (S.I. 1989/1278)
- Food Protection (Emergency Prohibitions) (Wales) (No. 5) Amendment No. 3 Order 1989 (S.I. 1989/1279)
- Education (Inner London Education Authority) Schools Designation Order 1989 (S.I. 1989/1280)
- Food Protection (Emergency Prohibitions) Amendment (No.2) Order 1989 (S.I. 1989/1281)
- Gipsy Encampments (Borough of Runnymede) Order 1989 (S.I. 1989/1282)
- Food Protection (Emergency Prohibitions) (England) Amendment No. 3 Order 1989 (S.I. 1989/1283)
- Sea Fish (Specified Sea Area) (Regulation of Nets and Prohibition of Fishing Methods) Order 1989 (S.I. 1989/1284)
- Undersized Bass Order 1989 (S.I. 1989/1285)
- Education (Grant-maintained Schools) (Finance) Regulations 1989 (S.I. 1989/1287)
- Education (Pre-Scheme Financial Statements) (Amendment) Regulations 1989 (S.I. 1989/1288)
- Income Tax (Employments) (No. 18) Regulations 1989 (S.I. 1989/1289)
- Income Tax (Sub-Contractors in the Construction Industry) (Amendment) Regulations 1989 (S.I. 1989/1290)
- Food Imitations (Safety) Regulations 1989 (S.I. 1989/1291)
- Copyright, Designs and Patents Act 1988 (Isle of Man) (No. 2) Order 1989 (S.I. 1989/1292)
- Copyright (Application to Other Countries) (No. 2) Order 1989 (S.I. 1989/1293)
- Design Right (Reciprocal Protection) (No. 2) Order 1989 (S.I. 1989/1294)
- Cod (Specified Sea Areas) (Prohibition of Fishing) (No. 3) Order 1989 (S.I. 1989/1295)
- Performances (Reciprocal Protection) (Convention Countries) (No. 2) Order 1989 (S.I. 1989/1296)
- Taxes (Interest Rate) Regulations 1989 (S.I. 1989/1297)
- Finance Act 1989, section 178(1), (Appointed Day No. 1) Order 1989 (S.I. 1989/1298)
- Income Tax (Stock Lending) Regulations 1989 (S.I. 1989/1299)
- Recovery of Tax in Summary Proceedings (Financial Limits) Order 1989 (S.I. 1989/1300)

== 1301–1400 ==
- Stamp Duty Reserve Tax (Amendment) Regulations 1989 (S.I. 1989/1301)
- Value Added Tax (General) (Amendment) (No. 2) Regulations 1989 (S.I. 1989/1302)
- Copyright, Designs and Patents Act 1988 (Commencement No. 4) Order 1989 (S.I. 1989/1303)
- Representation of the People (Northern Ireland) (Amendment) Regulations 1989 (S.I. 1989/1304)
- Merseyside Development Corporation (Vesting of Land) (General) Order 1989 (S.I. 1989/1305)
- Outer Space Act 1986 (Fees) Regulations 1989 (S.I. 1989/1306)
- Rules of the Supreme Court (Amendment No. 3) 1989 (S.I. 1989/1307)
- Education (National Curriculum) (Exceptions) (Wales) Regulations 1989 (S.I. 1989/1308)
- Import and Export (Plant Health Fees) (England and Wales) (Amendment) Order 1989 (S.I. 1989/1309)
- Beet Seeds (Amendment) Regulations 1989 (S.I. 1989/1310)
- Cereal Seeds (Amendment) Regulations 1989 (S.I. 1989/1311)
- Fodder Plant Seeds (Amendment) Regulations 1989 (S.I. 1989/1312)
- Oil and Fibre Plant Seeds (Amendment) Regulations 1989 (S.I. 1989/1313)
- Seeds (National Lists of Varieties) (Amendment) Regulations 1989 (S.I. 1989/1314)
- Vegetable Seeds (Amendment) Regulations 1989 (S.I. 1989/1315)
- Tuberculosis (Deer) Notice of Intended Slaughter and Compensation Order 1989 (S.I. 1989/1316)
- Atomic Energy Act 1989 (Commencement) Order 1989 (S.I. 1989/1317)
- Representation of the People Act 1989 (Commencement No.1) Order 1989 (S.I. 1989/1318)
- Education (Teachers) Regulations 1989 (S.I. 1989/1319)
- Community Charge Benefits (General) Regulations 1989 (S.I. 1989/1321)
- Community Charge Benefits (Transitional) Order 1989 (S.I. 1989/1322)
- Income Support (General) Amendment No. 2 Regulations 1989 (S.I. 1989/1323)
- Social Security (Unemployment, Sickness and Invalidity Benefit) Amendment No. 2 Regulations 1989 (S.I. 1989/1324)
- Guarantee Payments (Exemption) (No. 24) Order 1989 (S.I. 1989/1326)
- European Communities (Designation) Order 1989 (S.I. 1989/1327)
- Army, Air Force and Naval Discipline Acts (Continuation) Order 1989 (S.I. 1989/1328)
- Visiting Forces (Designation) Order 1989 (S.I. 1989/1329)
- Visiting Forces and International Headquarters (Application of Law) (Amendment) Order 1989 (S.I. 1989/1330)
- British Nationality (Pakistan) Order 1989 (S.I. 1989/1331)
- Child Abduction and Custody (Parties to Conventions) (Amendment) (No. 3) Order 1989 (S.I. 1989/1332)
- Gibraltar Supreme Court (Admiralty Practice) (Amendment) Rules Order 1989 (S.I. 1989/1333)
- Merchant Shipping Act 1988 (Bermuda) Order 1989 (S.I. 1989/1334)
- Home Guard (Amendment) Order 1989 (S.I. 1989/1335)
- Appropriation (No. 2)(Northern Ireland) Order 1989 (S.I. 1989/1336)
- Appropriation (No. 3)(Northern Ireland) Order 1989 (S.I. 1989/1337)
- Firearms (Amendment) (Northern Ireland) Order 1989 (S.I. 1989/1338)
- Limitation (Northern Ireland) Order 1989 (S.I. 1989/1339)
- Misuse of Drugs Act 1971 (Modification) Order 1989 (S.I. 1989/1340)
- Police and Criminal Evidence (Northern Ireland) Order 1989 S.I. 1989/1341)
- Social Security(Northern Ireland) Order 1989 (S.I. 1989/1342)
- Solicitors (Amendment)(Northern Ireland) Order 1989 (S.I. 1989/1343)
- Treatment of Offenders (Northern Ireland) Order 1989 (S.I. 1989/1344)
- Community Service Orders (Northern Ireland Consequential Amendments) Order 1989 (S.I. 1989/1345)
- Civil Jurisdiction and Judgments Act 1982 (Amendment) Order 1989 (S.I. 1989/1346)
- Registration of Title Order 1989 (S.I. 1989/1347)
- Arbitration (Foreign Awards) Order 1989 (S.I. 1989/1348)
- Air Navigation (Fifth Amendment) Order 1989 (S.I. 1989/1349)
- Hovercraft (Application of Enactments) Order 1989 (S.I. 1989/1350)
- Hovercraft (General) (Amendment) Order 1989 (S.I. 1989/1351)
- Education (Financial Delegation to Schools) (Mandatory Exceptions) Regulations 1989 (S.I. 1989/1352)
- Cider and Perry Regulations 1989 (S.I. 1989/1355)
- Wine and Made-wine Regulations 1989 (S.I. 1989/1356)
- Bingo Duty (Exemptions) Order 1989 (S.I. 1989/1357)
- Pool Betting Duty (Exemptions) Order 1989 (S.I. 1989/1358)
- Greater Manchester Residuary Body (Winding Up) Order 1989 (S.I. 1989/1359)
- National Health Service (General Medical and Pharmaceutical Services) Amendment Regulations 1989 (S.I. 1989/1360)
- Prevention of Terrorism (Temporary Provisions) Act 1989 (Commencement No. 1) Order 1989 (S.I. 1989/1361)
- Social Security (Attendance Allowance)Amendment Regulations 1989 (S.I. 1989/1362)
- Annual Close Time (Lossie Salmon Fishery District) Order 1989 (S.I. 1989/1363)
- Central Regional Council (The Stirlingshire and Falkirk Water Order 1957 Amendment) Water Order 1989 (S.I. 1989/1364)
- Scottish Land Court (Fees) Order 1989 (S.I. 1989/1365)
- Scottish Land Court Order 1989 (S.I. 1989/1366)
- Scottish Land Court Amendment Rules 1989 (S.I. 1989/1367)
- Excise Duties (Deferred Payment) (Amendment) Regulations 1989 (S.I. 1989/1368)
- Electricity Act 1989 (Commencement No.1) Order 1989 (S.I. 1989/1369)
- Electricity Supply (Scientists) Superannuation Scheme (Winding Up) Regulations 1989 (S.I. 1989/1370)
- Community Charges (Cross-Border Information) Regulations 1989 (S.I. 1989/1371)
- Motor Cars (Driving Instruction) (Amendment) Regulations 1989 (S.I. 1989/1373)
- Recovery Vehicles (Prescribed Purposes) Regulations 1989 (S.I. 1989/1376)
- Recovery Vehicles (Prescribed Purposes) Regulations (Northern Ireland) 1989 (S.I. 1989/1377)
- Rivers (Prevention of Pollution) Act 1951 (Continuation of Byelaws) Order 1989 (S.I. 1989/1378)
- Water and Sewerage (Works) (Advance Payments) Regulations 1989 (S.I. 1989/1379)
- Water (Local Statutory Provisions) (Consequential Amendments) Order 1989 (S.I. 1989/1380)
- Water Reorganisation (Pensions etc.) (Amendment) Regulations 1989 (S.I. 1989/1381)
- Water Reorganisation (Pensions etc.) (Designated Persons) (Amendment) Order 1989 (S.I. 1989/1382)
- Water Supply and Sewerage Services (Customer Service Standards) (Amendment) Regulations 1989 (S.I. 1989/1383)
- Water Supply (Water Quality) (Amendment) Regulations 1989 (S.I. 1989/1384)
- (A6) London–Inverness Trunk Road (Quorn–Mountsorrel Bypass and Slip Roads) Order 1989 (S.I. 1989/1387)
- (A6) London–Inverness Trunk Road (Quorn–Mountsorrel Bypass De-Trunking) Order 1989 (S.I. 1989/1388)
- Black Country Development Corporation (Vesting of Land) (Borough of Walsall) Order 1989 Approved by both Houses of ParliamentS.I. 1989/1389)
- Black Country Development Corporation (Vesting of Land) (General) Order 1989 (S.I. 1989/1390)
- London Docklands Development Corporation (Vesting of Land) (Port of London Authority and London Borough of Newham) Order 1989 (S.I. 1989/1391)
- London Docklands Development Corporation (Vesting of Land) (Thames Water Authority) Order 1989 (S.I. 1989/1392)
- Merseyside Development Corporation (Vesting of Land) (Transport Land) Order 1989Approved by both Houses of ParliamentS.I. 1989/1393)
- Sheffield Development Corporation (Vesting of Land) (British Railways Board) Order 1989 (S.I. 1989/1394)
- Black Country Development Corporation (Vesting of Land) (British Railways Board) Order 1989 (S.I. 1989/1395)
- Black Country Development Corporation (Vesting of Land) (Central Electricity Generating Board) Order 1989 (S.I. 1989/1396)
- Sandwell Borough Council (Holloway Bank Canal Bridge) Scheme 1988 Confirmation Instrument 1989 (S.I. 1989/1397)
- West of Maidenhead–Oxford Trunk Road (Crowmarsh Hill Realignment) Order 1989 (S.I. 1989/1398)
- Local Government Reorganisation (Property, etc.) (West Midlands) Order 1989 (S.I. 1989/1399)
- Agricultural Holdings (Units of Production) Order 1989 (S.I. 1989/1400)

== 1401–1500 ==
- Fire Precautions (Sub-surface Railway Stations) Regulations 1989 (S.I. 1989/1401)
- Dartford–Thurrock Crossing Tolls Order 1989 (S.I. 1989/1402)
- Leeds Development Corporation (Vesting of Land) (British Railways Board) Order 1989 Approved by both Houses of ParliamentS.I. 1989/1403)
- Leeds Development Corporation (Vesting of Land) (General) Order 1989 (S.I. 1989/1404)
- Tyne and Wear Development Corporation (Vesting of Land) (Port of Tyne Authority and British Railways Board) Order 1989 (S.I. 1989/1405)
- Tyne and Wear Development Corporation (Vesting of Land) (Various Local Authorities) Order 1989 (S.I. 1989/1406)
- Port of Tyne (Pilotage) Harbour Revision Order 1989 (S.I. 1989/1407)
- Severn-Trent Water Authority (Bradmer Hill and Budby Boreholes) Order 1989 (S.I. 1989/1419)
- Rent Officers (Additional Functions) (Amendment) Order 1989 (S.I. 1989/1430)
- London-Brighton Trunk Road (A23 Dale Hill Slip Roads) (No 2) Order 1989 (S.I. 1989/1431)
- London — Brighton Trunk Road (A23 Hickstead Slip Roads) (No 2) Order 1989 (S.I. 1989/1432)
- London–Brighton Trunk Road (A23 Warninglid Flyover–South of Bolney Slip Roads) Order 1989 (S.I. 1989/1433)
- London-Brighton Trunk Road (Bolney De-Trunking) Order 1989 (S.I. 1989/1434)
- Levens Bridge to Carlisle Trunk Road (A595 Egremont Bypass) (Detrunking) Order 1989 (S.I. 1989/1435)
- Levens Bridge to Carlisle Trunk Road (A595 Egremont Bypass) Order 1989 (S.I. 1989/1436)
- Authorised Unit Trust Scheme (Investment and Borrowing Powers) (Amendment) Regulations 1989 (S.I. 1989/1437)
- Air Navigation (Restriction of Flying) (Gruinard Island) (Revocation) Regulations 1989 (S.I. 1989/1438)
- Levens Bridge–Carlisle Trunk Road (A596 Wigton Bypass) (Detrunking) Order 1989 (S.I. 1989/1439)
- Levens Bridge–Carlisle Trunk Road (A596 Wigton Bypass) Order 1989 (S.I. 1989/1440)
- Rent Officers (Additional Functions) (Scotland) Amendment Order 1989 (S.I. 1989/1446)
- Education (Bursaries for Teacher Training) (Amendment) Regulations 1989 (S.I. 1989/1451)
- Education (Further and Higher Education Funding Schemes) (Publication and Information) Regulations 1989 (S.I. 1989/1452)
- Education (School Teachers' Pay and Conditions) (Amendment) Order 1989 (S.I. 1989/1453)
- Nurses, Midwives and Health Visitors (Parts of the Register) Amendment (No. 2) Order 1989 (S.I. 1989/1455)
- Nurses, Midwives and Health Visitors (Registered Fever Nurses Amendment Rules and Training Amendment Rules) Approval Order 1989 (S.I. 1989/1456)
- Reporting of Injuries, Diseases and Dangerous Occurrences (Amendment) Regulations 1989 (S.I. 1989/1457)
- Education (Mandatory Awards) Regulations 1989 (S.I. 1989/1458)
- Industrial Training Levy (Road Transport) Order 1989 (S.I. 1989/1459)
- Misuse of Drugs (Amendment) Regulations 1989 (S.I. 1989/1460)
- Companies Act 1985 (Modifications for Statutory Water Companies) Regulations 1989 (S.I. 1989/1461)
- Local Government Superannuation (Water) Regulations 1989 (S.I. 1989/1462)
- Colyton Grammar School (Designation of Staff) Order 1989 (S.I. 1989/1463)
- Water Authorities (Successor Companies) Order 1989 (S.I. 1989/1465)
- Education (Adult Education Centres Funding Schemes) Regulations 1989 (S.I. 1989/1468)
- Education (Grant-maintained Schools) (Publication of Proposals) Regulations 1989 (S.I. 1989/1469)
- Education (Proposed Further and Higher Education Institutions) Regulations 1989 (S.I. 1989/1470)
- A23 Trunk Road (Brighton Road, Croydon) (Prescribed Routes) Order 1989 (S.I. 1989/1471)
- Social Security (Contribution Conditions for Unemployment and Sickness Benefit) Transitional Regulations 1989 (S.I. 1989/1472)
- Car Tax (Amendment) Regulations 1989 (S.I. 1989/1473)
- Standard and Collective Community Charges (Scotland) Amendment (No.2) Regulations 1989 (S.I. 1989/1476)
- Abolition of Domestic Rates (Domestic and Part Residential Subjects) (No.2) (Scotland) Regulations 1989 (S.I. 1989/1477)
- Road Vehicles (Construction and Use) (Amendment) Regulations 1989 (S.I. 1989/1478)
- Aerodromes (Designation) (Facilities for Consultation) Order 1989 (S.I. 1989/1489)
- Civil Legal Aid (Scotland) (Fees) Regulations 1989 (S.I. 1989/1490)
- Criminal Legal Aid (Scotland) (Fees) Regulations 1989 (S.I. 1989/1491)
- Advice and Assistance (Scotland) Amendment (No.2) Regulations 1989 (S.I. 1989/1492)
- Legal Advice and Assistance (Scotland) Amendment Regulations 1989 (S.I. 1989/1493)
- Legal Aid (Scotland) (Fees in Criminal Proceedings) Amendment (No.2) Regulations 1989 (S.I. 1989/1494)
- Legal Aid (Scotland) (Fees in Civil Proceedings) Amendment (No.2) Regulations 1989 (S.I. 1989/1495)
- Central Regional Council (Denny and Dunipace Water Supply Confirmation Act 1888) Repeal Order 1989 (S.I. 1989/1498)
- Annual Close Time (River Dee (Aberdeenshire) Salmon Fishery District) Order 1989 (S.I. 1989/1499)
- River Dee (Aberdeenshire) Salmon Fishery District (Baits and Lures) Regulations 1989 (S.I. 1989/1500)

== 1501–1600 ==
- Northern Ireland (Emergency Provisions) Act 1978 (Amendment) Order 1989 (S.I. 1989/1501)
- Anglian Water Authority (Rushbrooke Borehole) Order 1989 (S.I. 1989/1502)
- Education (School Government) Regulations 1989 (S.I. 1989/1503)
- Levens Bridge–Carlisle Trunk Road (A595 Hensingham Bypass) (Detrunking) Order 1989 (S.I. 1989/1504)
- Levens Bridge – Carlisle Trunk Road (A595 Hensingham Bypass) Order 1989 (S.I. 1989/1505)
- Finance Act 1989 (Savings-Related Share Option Schemes) (Appointed Day) Order 1989 (S.I. 1989/1520)
- Savings Certificates (Yearly Plan) (Amendment) Regulations 1989 (S.I. 1989/1521)
- London–Edinburgh–Thurso Trunk Road (Bramham Moor to Grange Moor and Slip Roads) Order 1989 (S.I. 1989/1525)
- A2 and the A205 Trunk Roads (Rochester Way and Westhorne Avenue Detrunking)Order 1989 (S.I. 1989/1526)
- Water Authorities (Transfer of Functions) (Appointed Day) Order 1989 (S.I. 1989/1530)
- Water Reorganisation (Holding Companies of Successor Companies) Order 1989 (S.I. 1989/1531)
- Water Reorganisation (Successor Companies) (Transfer of Loans) Order 1989 (S.I. 1989/1532)
- Financial Services (Authorised Unit Trust Scheme) (Certificate of Compliance) Regulations 1989 (S.I. 1989/1535)
- Education (Teachers) (Amendment) (No. 2) Regulations 1989 (S.I. 1989/1541)
- Harwich Dock Company Harbour Empowerment Order 1988S.I. 1989/1545)
- Essex (District Boundaries) Order 1989 (S.I. 1989/1546)
- Landlord and Tenant Act 1954, Part II (Notices) (Amendment) Regulations 1989 (S.I. 1989/1548)
- A1079 Trunk Road (Market Weighton Bypass) Order 1989 (S.I. 1989/1549)
- A1079 Trunk Road (York Road to Weighton Hill) (Detrunking) Order 1989 (S.I. 1989/1550)
- Diseases of Animals (Approved Disinfectants) (Amendment) (No. 2) Order 1989 (S.I. 1989/1555)
- A35 Trunk Road (Yellowham Hill, Troy Town Improvement) Order 1989 (S.I. 1989/1556)
- Water Act 1989 (Commencement No. 2 and Transitional Provisions) Order 1989 (S.I. 1989/1557)
- Merger Reference (Blue Circle Industries plc and Myson Group plc) Order 1989 (S.I. 1989/1558)
- Merger Reference (Yale & Valor plc and Myson Group plc) Order 1989 (S.I. 1989/1559)
- Water Act 1989 (Commencement No. 3) (Scotland) Order 1989 (S.I. 1989/1561)
- Submarine Pipe-lines (Designated Owners) (No. 19) Order 1989 (S.I. 1989/1562)
- Submarine Pipe-lines (Designated Owners) (No. 20) Order 1989 (S.I. 1989/1563)
- Submarine Pipe-lines (Designated Owners) (No. 21) Order 1989 (S.I. 1989/1564)
- Submarine Pipe-lines (Designated Owners) (No. 22) Order 1989 (S.I. 1989/1565)
- Submarine Pipe-lines (Designated Owners) (No. 23) Order 1989 (S.I. 1989/1566)
- Submarine Pipe-lines (Designated Owners) (No. 24) Order 1989 (S.I. 1989/1567)
- Submarine Pipe-lines (Designated Owners) (No. 25) Order 1989 (S.I. 1989/1568)
- Guarantee Payments (Exemption) (No. 25) Order 1989 (S.I. 1989/1575)
- Sea Fishing (Enforcement of Community Conservation Measures) (Amendment) (No. 2) Order 1989 (S.I. 1989/1576)
- Motor Vehicles (Type Approval) (Amendment) Regulations 1989 (S.I. 1989/1578)
- Motor Vehicles (Type Approval for Goods Vehicles) (Great Britain) (Amendment) Regulations 1989 (S.I. 1989/1579)
- Motor Vehicles (Type Approval) (Great Britain) (Amendment) Regulations 1989 (S.I. 1989/1580)
- Financial Services Act 1986 (Commencement) (No. 12) Order 1989 (S.I. 1989/1583)
- Financial Services (Schemes Authorised in Designated Countries or Territories) (Notification) Regulations 1989 (S.I. 1989/1584)
- Financial Services (Schemes Constituted in Other Member States) Regulations 1989 (S.I. 1989/1585)
- Financial Services (Recognised Collective Investment Schemes from Other Member States) (Luxembourg) Order 1988 (Revocation) Order 1989 (S.I. 1989/1586)
- Insolvency Practitioners (Amendment) Regulations 1989 (S.I. 1989/1587)
- Local Government (Direct Labour Organisations) (Competition) Regulations 1989 (S.I. 1989/1588)
- Local Government (Direct Labour Organisations) (Specified Number of Employed Persons) Order 1989 (S.I. 1989/1589)
- Town and Country Planning General Development (Amendment) (No. 2) Order 1989 (S.I. 1989/1590)
- Motorcycles (Sound Level Measurement Certificates) (Amendment) (No.2) Regulations 1989 (S.I. 1989/1591)
- Petty Sessional Divisions (Essex) Order 1989 (S.I. 1989/1592)
- Criminal Justice Act 1988 (Commencement No. 9) Order 1989 (S.I. 1989/1595)
- Magistrates' Courts (Backing of Warrants) (Amendment) Rules 1989 (S.I. 1989/1596)
- Magistrates' Courts (Extradition) Rules 1989 (S.I. 1989/1597)
- A6(M) Motorway (Stockport North–South Bypass) and Connecting Roads Scheme 1989 (S.I. 1989/1598)
- A6 Trunk Road (Hazel Grove Diversion) Order 1989 (S.I. 1989/1599)
- A6 Trunk Road Hazel Grove (Detrunking) Order 1989 (S.I. 1989/1600)

== 1601–1700 ==
- A523 Trunk Road (Hazel Grove Diversion) Order 1989 (S.I. 1989/1601)
- A523 Trunk Road Hazel Grove (Detrunking) Order 1989 (S.I. 1989/1602)
- Customs Duties (ECSC) (Amendment No. 5) Order 1989 (S.I. 1989/1610)
- Special Hospitals Service Authority (Functions and Membership) Amendment Regulations 1989 (S.I. 1989/1611)
- Motor Vehicles (Driving Licences) (Amendment) (No. 3) Regulations 1989 (S.I. 1989/1612)
- Hovercraft (Fees) Regulations 1989 (S.I. 1989/1613)
- Anglian Water Authority (East Watton Borehole) Order 1989 (S.I. 1989/1614)
- Severn-Trent Water Authority (Nether Padley) Mains Order 1989 (S.I. 1989/1615)
- A47 Trunk Road (East Norton Bypass) Order 1989 (S.I. 1989/1619)
- Welsh Water Authority (Abergele Chest Hospital Waterworks) Order 1989 (S.I. 1989/1620)
- Welsh Water Authority (Parc to Glanrhyd Hospital Water Supply) Order 1989 (S.I. 1989/1621)
- Welsh Water Authority (Pendine Water Supply) Order 1989 (S.I. 1989/1622)
- Welsh Water Authority (North Wales Hospital, Denbigh, Waterworks) Order 1989 (S.I. 1989/1623)
- Local Government Superannuation (Valuation and Community Charge Tribunals) Regulations 1989 (S.I. 1989/1624)
- Bodmin Railway Centre Light Railway Order 1989 (SI 1989/1625)
- Income Support (Transitional) Amendment Regulations 1989 (S.I. 1989/1626)
- Social Security (Credits) Amendment Regulations 1989 (S.I. 1989/1627)
- Assured and Protected Tenancies (Lettings to Students) (Amendment) Regulations 1989 (S.I. 1989/1628)
- National Health Service (General Dental Services) Amendment (No. 3) Regulations 1989 (S.I. 1989/1629)
- National Health Service (Service Committees and Tribunal) Amendment Regulations 1989 (S.I. 1989/1630)
- Personal and Occupational Pension Schemes (Miscellaneous Amendments) (No. 2) Regulations 1989 (S.I. 1989/1641)
- Social Security (Abolition of Earnings Rule) (Consequential) Regulations 1989 (S.I. 1989/1642)
- Gipsy Encampments (Borough of Oadby and Wigston) Order 1989 (S.I. 1989/1647)
- Gipsy Encampments (District of Blaby) Order 1989 (S.I. 1989/1648)
- A33 Trunk Road (Chilcomb Link) Detrunking Order 1989 (S.I. 1989/1649)
- A33 Trunk Road (Popham–Kingsworthy) Detrunking Order 1989 (S.I. 1989/1650)
- Cardiff-Glan Conwy Trunk Road (A470) The Newtown-Aberystwyth Trunk Road (A44) (Trunk Roads and Junction Improvements, Llangurig) Order 1989 (S.I. 1989/1661)
- Motor Vehicles (Authorisation of Special Types) (Amendment) Order 1989 (S.I. 1989/1662)
- A406 Trunk Road (North Circular Road, Brent) (Prescribed Routes) Order 1989 (S.I. 1989/1665)
- Offshore Installations and Pipeline Works (First-Aid) Regulations 1989 (S.I. 1989/1671)
- Offshore Installations (Operational Safety, Health and Welfare and Life-Saving Appliances) (Revocations) Regulations 1989 (S.I. 1989/1672)
- Firearms (Amendment) Act 1988 (Commencement No. 2) Order (Amendment) Order 1989 (S.I. 1989/1673)
- Superannuation (Valuation and Community Charge Tribunals) Order 1989 (S.I. 1989/1674)
- Orkney Islands Council (Loch of Boardhouse) (Amendment) Water Order 1989 (S.I. 1989/1676)
- Social Security (Contributions) (Transitional and Consequential Provisions) Regulations 1989 (S.I. 1989/1677)
- Income Support (General) Amendment No. 3 Regulations 1989 (S.I. 1989/1678)
- Oxfordshire County Council (Oxford Canal, Bridge) Scheme 1987 Confirmation Instrument 1989 (S.I. 1989/1680)
- Social Security (Medical Evidence, Claims and Payments) Amendment Regulations 1989 (S.I. 1989/1686)
- Social Security (Severe Disablement Allowance (Amendment) and Local Councillors Consequential) Regulations 1989 (S.I. 1989/1687)
- Housing Benefit (Permitted Totals) Amendment Order 1989 (S.I. 1989/1688)
- Social Security (Adjudication) Amendment Regulations 1989 (S.I. 1989/1689)
- Social Security Benefit (Dependency and Computation of Earnings) Amendment Regulations 1989 (S.I. 1989/1690)
- A23 Trunk Road (Streatham High Road, Lambeth) (Prohibition of Right Turn) Order 1989 (S.I. 1989/1691)
- Cod (Specified Sea Areas) (Prohibition of Fishing) (No. 4) Order 1989 (S.I. 1989/1692)
- Goods Vehicles (Plating and Testing) (Amendment) (No. 2) Regulations 1989 (S.I. 1989/1693)
- Motor Vehicles (Tests) (Amendment) (No.2) Regulations 1989 (S.I. 1989/1694)
- Road Vehicles (Construction and Use) (Amendment) (No. 2) Regulations 1989 (S.I. 1989/1695)

== 1701–1800 ==
- Building Societies (Liquid Asset) (Amendment) Regulations 1989 (S.I. 1989/1701)
- A12 Trunk Road (Capel St. Mary Grade-Separated Junction Slip Roads) Order 1989 (S.I. 1989/1715)
- M32 Motorway (Hambrook Interchange to Lower Ashley Road Interchange) and Connecting Roads Scheme 1989 (S.I. 1989/1716)
- Merger Reference (Atlas Copco AB and Desoutter Brothers (Holdings) plc) Order 1989 (S.I. 1989/1718)
- The Wychavon (Parishes) Order 1989 S.I. 1989/1721
- Further Education (Recoupment) (Amendment) Regulations 1989 (S.I. 1989/1722)
- A65 Trunk Road (Draughton Bypass) Order 1989 (S.I. 1989/1735)
- A65 Trunk Road (Draughton Bypass De-Trunking) Order 1989 (S.I. 1989/1736)
- Great Yarmouth Port Authority Harbour Revision Order 1989 (S.I. 1989/1737)
- Education (Publication and Consultation Etc.) (Scotland) Amendment Regulations 1989 (S.I. 1989/1739)
- Police (Amendment) (No. 2) Regulations 1989 (S.I. 1989/1745)
- Immobilisation of Vehicles Illegally Parked (London Borough of Hammersmith and Fulham) Order 1989 (S.I. 1989/1746)
- A5 Trunk Road (Shrawardine Turn) Order 1989 (S.I. 1989/1747)
- Anglian Water Authority (High Pale) Boreholes Order 1989 (S.I. 1989/1748)
- National Health Service (Superannuation) (Scotland) Amendment (No.2) Regulations 1989 (S.I. 1989/1749)
- A6 Trunk Road (Market Harborough Bypass) Order 1989 (S.I. 1989/1755)
- A6 Trunk Road (Market Harborough Bypass) Detrunking Order 1989 (S.I. 1989/1756)
- City of Manchester (M56 North Cheshire Motorway) (Bowdon to Wythenshawe Airport Link Road Section) Connecting Roads Scheme 1988 Confirmation Instrument 1989 (S.I. 1989/1757)
- Local Review Committee (Scotland) Amendment Rules 1989 (S.I. 1989/1761)
- Food Protection (Emergency Prohibitions) Amendment No. 3 Order 1989 (S.I. 1989/1764)
- Protection of Wrecks (Designation No. 1 Order 1979) (Amendment) Order 1989 (S.I. 1989/1766)
- Export of Sheep (Prohibition) (No. 2) Amendment No. 3 Order 1989 (S.I. 1989/1767)
- Food Protection (Emergency Prohibitions) (England) Amendment No. 4 Order 1989 (S.I. 1989/1768)
- Smoke Control Areas (Exempted Fireplaces) Order 1989 (S.I. 1989/1769)
- Food Protection (Emergency Prohibitions) (Wales) (No. 5) Amendment No. 4 Order 1989 (S.I. 1989/1770)
- Cambridgeshire County Council (River Nene Old Course, Bodsey Bridge Reconstruction) Scheme 1989 Confirmation Instrument 1989 (S.I. 1989/1774)
- Finance Act 1989 (Repeal of Tithe Redemption Enactments) (Appointed Day) Order 1989 (S.I. 1989/1788)
- Noise at Work Regulations 1989 (S.I. 1989/1790)
- Road Vehicles Lighting Regulations 1989 (S.I. 1989/1796)
- A134 Principal Road (Thetford to Tottenhill Trunking) Order 1989 (S.I. 1989/1797)
- Merchant Shipping (Distress Signals and Prevention of Collisions) Regulations 1989 (S.I. 1989/1798)
- London Government Reorganisation (Property etc.) (No. 2) Order 1989 (S.I. 1989/1799)
- Macduff (Pilotage Powers) Order 1989 (S.I. 1989/1800)

== 1801–1900 ==
- Scottish Milk Marketing Scheme (Consolidation) Approval Order 1989 (S.I. 1989/1806)
- A6 Trunk Road (Black Lodge Improvement) Order 1989 (S.I. 1989/1807)
- A6 Trunk Road (Burton Latimer Bypass) Order 1989 (S.I. 1989/1808)
- Genetic Manipulation Regulations 1989 (S.I. 1989/1810)
- London Government Reorganisation (Pensions etc.) Order 1989 (S.I. 1989/1815)
- Building Societies (Designation of Qualifying Bodies) (Amendment) (No. 2) Order 1989 (S.I. 1989/1816)
- Building Societies (Gibraltar) Order 1989 (S.I. 1989/1817)
- Cereals Co-responsibility Levy (Amendment) (No. 2) Regulations 1989 (S.I. 1989/1823)
- Social Security (Industrial Injuries and Diseases) Miscellaneous Provisions (Amendment) Regulations 1989 (S.I. 1989/1824)
- Education (Abolition of Corporal Punishment) (Independent Schools) (Prescribed Categories of Persons) Regulations 1989 (S.I. 1989/1825)
- Civil Aviation Authority (Amendment) Regulations 1989 (S.I. 1989/1826)
- Cholsey and Wallingford Light Railway Order 1989 (SI 1989/1833)
- Newport–Shrewsbury Trunk Road A4042 (Malpas Interchange to Cwmbran Drive, De-Trunking) Order 1989 (S.I. 1989/1836)
- General Medical Council Professional Conduct Committee (EC Practitioners) (Procedure) Rules Order of Council 1989 (S.I. 1989/1837)
- County Court (Amendment No. 3) Rules 1989 (S.I. 1989/1838)
- Acquisition of Land (Rate of Interest after Entry) Regulations 1989 (S.I. 1989/1839)
- Acquisition of Land (Rate of Interest after Entry) (Scotland) Regulations 1989 (S.I. 1989/1840)
- Consumer Credit (Exempt Agreements) (Amendment) Order 1989 (S.I. 1989/1841)
- Wireless Telegraphy (Testing and Development Under Suppressed Radiation Conditions) (Exemption) Regulations 1989 (S.I. 1989/1842)
- Road Traffic (Driver Licensing and Information Systems) Act 1989 (Commencement No. 1) Order 1989 (S.I. 1989/1843)
- Public Service Vehicles (Temporary Driving Entitlement) Regulations 1989 (S.I. 1989/1844)
- East of Christchurch–Tredegar Park Motorway (Connecting Roads Special Roads) (Variation) Scheme 1989 (S.I. 1989/1846)
- M4/Newport-Shrewsbury Trunk Road A4042 (Relief of Brynglas Tunnels and Malpas Road) Order 1989 (S.I. 1989/1847)
- Wireless Telegraphy (Licence Charges) Regulations 1989 (S.I. 1989/1850)
- Offshore Installations (Safety Zones) (No. 3) Order 1989 (S.I. 1989/1851)
- Medicines (Prescription Only, Pharmacy and General Sale) Amendment Order 1989 (S.I. 1989/1852)
- Newtown-Aberystwyth Trunk Road (A489) (Mochdre Roundabout, Newtown) Order 1989 (S.I. 1989/1862)
- Road Vehicles (Construction and Use) (Amendment) (No. 3) Regulations 1989 (S.I. 1989/1865)
- Yorkshire Water Authority (Alteration of Boundaries of the Lower Ouse Internal Drainage District) Order 1989 (S.I. 1989/1866)
- East Lewis Salmon Fishery District Designation Order 1989 (S.I. 1989/1869)
- Ipswich–Norwich Trunk Road (A140) (Dickleburgh Bypass) Order 1989 (S.I. 1989/1871)
- Ipswich-Norwich Trunk Road (A140) (Dickleburgh Bypass) (Detrunking) Order 1989 (S.I. 1989/1872)
- Carriage of Passengers and their Luggage by Sea (United Kingdom Carriers) (Amendment) Order 1989 (S.I. 1989/1880)
- Merchant Shipping Act 1979 (Commencement No. 13) Order 1989 (S.I. 1989/1881)
- Merchant Shipping (Sterling Equivalents)(Merchant Shipping Act 1974) Order 1989 (S.I. 1989/1882)
- National Health Service (General Medical and Pharmaceutical Services) (Scotland) Amendment Regulations 1989 (S.I. 1989/1883)
- Health and Medicines Act 1988 (Superannuation) (Savings for Retired Practitioners) Regulations 1989 (S.I. 1989/1893)
- Health and Medicines Act 1988 (Commencement No.7) Order 1989 (S.I. 1989/1896)
- National Health Service (General Medical and Pharmaceutical Services) Amendment (No. 2) Regulations 1989 (S.I. 1989/1897)
- Excise Duties (Personal Reliefs) (Fuel and Lubricants Imported in Vehicles) Order 1989 (S.I. 1989/1898)

== 1901–2000 ==
- Land Registration (District Registries) Order 1989 (S.I. 1989/1902)
- Health and Safety (Enforcing Authority) Regulations 1989 (S.I. 1989/1903)
- Income Tax (Reserve and Auxiliary Forces) (Amendment) Regulations 1989 (S.I. 1989/1905)
- Public Telecommunication System Designation (Cable Camden Limited) Order 1989 (S.I. 1989/1912)
- Public Telecommunication System Designation (CableVision Bedfordshire Limited) Order 1989 (S.I. 1989/1913)
- Export of Goods (Control) (Amendment No. 5) Order 1989 (S.I. 1989/1914)
- County Court (Forms) (Amendment No. 2) Rules 1989 (S.I. 1989/1918)
- Severn Bridge Tolls Order 1989 (S.I. 1989/1922)
- Highland Regional Council (Allt Bail'an Tuim Bhuidhe) Water Order 1989 (S.I. 1989/1923)
- Fair Employment (Northern Ireland) Act 1989 (Commencement) Order 1989 (S.I. 1989/1928)
- Wireless Telegraphy (Licence Charges) (Amendment) Regulations 1989 (S.I. 1989/1929)
- Income Tax (Interest Relief) (Qualifying Lenders) (No. 2) Order 1989 (S.I. 1989/1932)
- Sale of Registration Marks Regulations 1989 (S.I. 1989/1938)
- Water (Pensions and Compensation) (Transfer of Liabilities) Regulations 1989 (S.I. 1989/1939)
- Offshore Installations (Life-saving Appliances and Fire-fighting Equipment) (Amendment) Regulations 1989 (S.I. 1989/1940)
- Cowes Harbour Revision Order 1989 (S.I. 1989/1941)
- Plant Health (Forestry) (Great Britain) (Amendment) Order 1989 (S.I. 1989/1951)
- Insurance Companies (Accounts and Statements) (Amendment) Regulations 1989 (S.I. 1989/1952)
- Condensed Milk and Dried Milk (Amendment) Regulations 1989 (S.I. 1989/1959)
- Sea Fishing (Enforcement of Community Quota Measures) (Amendment) Order 1989 (S.I. 1989/1960)
- Poultry Breeding Flocks and Hatcheries (Registration and Testing) Order 1989 (S.I. 1989/1963)
- Poultry Laying Flocks (Testing and Registration etc.) Order 1989 (S.I. 1989/1964)
- Water (Consequential Amendments) Regulations 1989 (S.I. 1989/1968)
- Fishguard–Bangor Trunk Road A487 (Port Dinorwic By-Pass) Order 1989 (S.I. 1989/1969)
- Condensed Milk and Dried Milk (Scotland) Amendment Regulations 1989 (S.I. 1989/1975)
- Borough of Warrington (Electoral Arrangements) Order 1989 (S.I. 1989/1976)
- Unitary Development Plans (South Yorkshire and Hounslow) (Appointed Day) Order 1989 (S.I. 1989/1979)
- Health and Medicines Act 1988 (Commencement No.8) Order 1989 (S.I. 1989/1984)
- Medicines (Pharmacies) (Applications for Registration and Fees) Amendment Regulations 1989 (S.I. 1989/1985)
- Social Security (Industrial Injuries and Diseases) Miscellaneous Provisions (Amendment) (No. 2) Regulations 1989 (S.I. 1989/1986)
- National Health Service (General Medical and Pharmaceutical Services) (Scotland) Amendment (No.2) Regulations 1989 (S.I. 1989/1990)
- Merchant Shipping (Ministry of Defence Ships) Order 1989 (S.I. 1989/1991)
- Local Authorities (Armorial Bearings) (No. 2) Order 1989 (S.I. 1989/1992)
- Falkland Islands (Territorial Sea) Order 1989 (S.I. 1989/1993)
- St. Helena and Dependencies (Territorial Sea) Order 1989 (S.I. 1989/1994)
- South Georgia and South Sandwich Islands (Territorial Sea) Order 1989 (S.I. 1989/1995)
- Turks and Caicos Islands (Territorial Sea) Order 1989 (S.I. 1989/1996)
- Copyright, Designs and Patents Act 1988 (Guernsey) Order 1989 (S.I. 1989/1997)
- Fuel and Electricity (Control) Act 1973 (Continuation) (Jersey) Order 1989 (S.I. 1989/1998)
- Licensing and Clubs (Amendment) (Northern Ireland) Order 1989 (S.I. 1989/1999)
- Judicial Committee (Fees) Order 1989 (S.I. 1989/2000)

== 2001–2100 ==
- Social Security (Isle of Man) (No. 2) Order 1989 (S.I. 1989/2001)
- Social Security (Philippines) Order 1989 (S.I. 1989/2002)
- Fraudulent Reception of Transmissions (Guernsey) Order 1989 (S.I. 1989/2003)
- Air Navigation Order 1989 (S.I. 1989/2004)
- Collision Regulations (Seaplanes) Order 1989 (S.I. 1989/2005)
- Merchant Shipping Act 1988 (Amendment) Order 1989 (S.I. 1989/2006)
- Shrewsbury–Whitchurch–Warrington Trunk Road (A49, Tarporley Road, Stretton) (Trunking) Order 1989 (S.I. 1989/2008)
- Financial Services (Disclosure of Information) (Designated Authorities) (No. 6) Order 1989 (S.I. 1989/2009)
- A406 Trunk Road (South Woodford to Barking Relief Road, Redbridge, Newham, Barking and Dagenham) (Prescribed Routes) Order 1989 (S.I. 1989/2010)
- Bristol Development Corporation (Vesting of Land) (British Railways Board) Order 1989 (S.I. 1989/2011)
- Feeding Stuffs (Amendment) Regulations 1989 (S.I. 1989/2014)
- Sea Fish Licensing Order 1989 (S.I. 1989/2015)
- Passenger and Goods Vehicles (Recording Equipment) (Approval of Fitters and Workshops) (Fees) (Amendment) Regulations 1989 (S.I. 1989/2016)
- Water Reorganisation (Capital Allowances) Order 1989 (S.I. 1989/2017)
- Water Reorganisation (Nominated Holding Companies) (Extinguishment of Loans) Order 1989 (S.I. 1989/2018)
- Renfrew and Cunninghame Districts (Caldwell House Estate) Boundaries Amendment Order 1989 (S.I. 1989/2021) (S. 140)
- Public Telecommunication System Designation (Merseyside Cablevision Limited) Order 1989 (S.I. 1989/2034)
- Public Telecommunication System Designation (Lancashire Cable Television Limited) Order 1989 (S.I. 1989/2035)
- Boston Harbour Revision Order 1989 (S.I. 1989/2036)
- Education (Areas to which Pupils and Students Belong) Regulations 1989 (S.I. 1989/2037)
- The Mid Bedfordshire (Parishes) Order 1989 S.I. 1989/2040
- National Savings Bank (Amendment) (No. 2) Regulations 1989 (S.I. 1989/2045)
- National Savings Stock Register (Amendment) (No. 2) Regulations 1989 (S.I. 1989/2046)
- Movement of Animals (Records) (Amendment) (No. 2) Order 1989 (S.I. 1989/2053)
- Education (Designated Institutions) (Amendment) Order 1989 (S.I. 1989/2055)
- Food Protection (Emergency Prohibitions) (Contamination of Feeding Stuff) (Wales) Order 1989 (S.I. 1989/2056)
- Motor Cars (Driving Instruction) Regulations 1989 (S.I. 1989/2057)
- Goods Vehicles (Authorisation of International Journeys) (Fees) (Amendment) Regulations 1989 (S.I. 1989/2058)
- London–King's Lynn Trunk Road (A10) (Brandon Creek – Southery Improvement) Order 1989 (S.I. 1989/2059)
- Food Protection (Emergency Prohibitions) (Contamination of Feeding Stuff) (England) Amendment No.2 Order 1989 (S.I. 1989/2060)
- Bovine Offal (Prohibition) Regulations 1989 (S.I. 1989/2061)
- Civil Aviation (Investigation of Air Accidents) Regulations 1989 (S.I. 1989/2062)
- Public Telecommunication System Designation (Birmingham Cable Limited) Order 1989 (S.I. 1989/2072)
- The East Lindsey (Parishes) Order 1989 S.I. 1989/2073
- Food Protection (Emergency Prohibitions) (Contamination of Feeding Stuff) (England) (No. 2) Order 1989 (S.I. 1989/2077)
- Food Protection (Emergency Prohibitions) (Contamination of Feeding Stuff) (Wales) Amendment Order 1989 (S.I. 1989/2078)
- Food Protection (Emergency Prohibitions) (Contamination of Feeding Stuff) (England) (No. 2) Amendment Order 1989 (S.I. 1989/2087)
- Food Protection (Emergency Prohibitions) (Contamination of Feeding Stuff) (England) (No. 2) Amendment No. 2 Order 1989 (S.I. 1989/2088)
- Protection of Wrecks (Designation No. 1) Order 1989 (S.I. 1989/2089)
- Chester-Bangor Trunk Road (A55) (Rhuallt Hill Improvement and Slip Roads) Order 1989 (S.I. 1989/2091)
- Food Protection (Emergency Prohibitions) (Contamination of Feeding Stuff) (Wales) (No. 2) Order 1989 (S.I. 1989/2092)
- Security Service Act 1989 (Commencement) Order 1989 (S.I. 1989/2093)
- Church Representation Rules (Amendment) (No. 1) Resolution 1989 (S.I. 1989/2094)
- Church Representation Rules (Amendment) (No. 2) Resolution 1989 (S.I. 1989/2095)
- Haddock (Specified Sea Areas) (Prohibition of Fishing) Order 1989 (S.I. 1989/2096)
- Cumbria, Northumberland and North Yorkshire (County Boundaries) Order 1989 (S.I. 1989/2097)
- Alcoholic Liquor Duties Act 1979 (Repeal of Section 31) Order 1989 (S.I. 1989/2098)
- Food Protection (Emergency Prohibitions) (Contamination of Feeding Stuff) (England) (No. 3) Order 1989 (S.I. 1989/2100)

== 2101–2200 ==
- East Surrey Water (Constitution and Regulation) Order 1989 (S.I. 1989/2101)
- Housing (Right to Buy)(Priority of Charges)(No. 2) Order 1989 (S.I. 1989/2102)
- Home Purchase Assistance (Recognised Lending Institutions) (No. 2) Order 1989 (S.I. 1989/2103)
- Mortgage Indemnities (Recognised Bodies) (No. 2) Order 1989 (S.I. 1989/2104)
- Food Protection (Emergency Prohibitions) (Contamination of Feeding Stuff) (Wales) (No. 2) Amendment Order 1989 (S.I. 1989/2105)
- Human Organ Transplants Act 1989 (Commencement) Order 1989 (S.I. 1989/2106)
- Human Organ Transplants (Establishment of Relationship) Regulations 1989 (S.I. 1989/2107)
- Human Organ Transplants (Supply of Information) Regulations 1989 (S.I. 1989/2108)
- Food Protection (Emergency Prohibitions) (Contamination of Feeding Stuff) (Wales) (No. 3) Order 1989 (S.I. 1989/2109)
- Unitary Development Plans (Greater Manchester and Sunderland) (Appointed Day) Order 1989 (S.I. 1989/2114)
- The Woking (Parish of Byfleet) Order 1989 S.I. 1989/2116
- Air Navigation (Restriction of Flying) (Security Establishments in Northern Ireland) Regulations 1989 (S.I. 1989/2117)
- Air Navigation (Restriction of Flying) (High Security Prisons) Regulations 1989 (S.I. 1989/2118)
- Shrewsbury–Whitchurch–Warrington Trunk Road (A49 Weaverham Diversion, Cheshire) Order 1989 (S.I. 1989/2119)
- Shrewsbury – Whitchurch – Warrington Trunk Road A49 Trunk Road Weaverham (Detrunking) Order 1989 (S.I. 1989/2120)
- Passenger and Goods Vehicles (Recording Equipment) Regulations 1989 (S.I. 1989/2121)
- Social Security (Unemployment, Sickness and Invalidity Benefit) Amendment No. 3 Regulations 1989 (S.I. 1989/2122)
- Social Security Benefit (Computation of Earnings) Amendment Regulations 1989 (S.I. 1989/2123)
- Food Protection (Emergency Prohibitions) (Contamination of Feeding Stuff) (England) (No.3) Amendment Order 1989 (S.I. 1989/2124)
- Edinburgh City Bypass (Sighthill, Colinton, Burdiehouse, Gilmerton and Millerhill Sections and Connecting Roads) (Speed Limit) Regulations 1989 (S.I. 1989/2125)
- Rules of Procedure (Army) (Amendment) Rules 1989 (S.I. 1989/2127)
- Police and Criminal Evidence Act 1984 Codes of Practice (Armed Forces) Order 1989 (S.I. 1989/2128)
- Rules of Procedure (Air Force) (Amendment) Rules 1989 (S.I. 1989/2129)
- Standing Civilian Courts (Amendment) Order 1989 (S.I. 1989/2130)
- Meat and Meat Products (Hormonal Substances) Regulations 1989 (S.I. 1989/2133)
- Traffic Signs (Amendment) Regulations 1989 and the Traffic Signs (Amendment) General Directions 1989 (S.I. 1989/2139)
- Sex Discrimination Act 1975 (Exemption of Special Treatment for Lone Parents) Order 1989 (S.I. 1989/2140)
- Prison (Amendment) (No. 2) Rules 1989 (S.I. 1989/2141)
- Young Offender Institution (Amendment) (No. 2) Rules 1989 (S.I. 1989/2142)
- A12 Trunk Road (Colchester Road, Havering) (Prescribed Routes) Order 1989 (S.I. 1989/2143)
- Colne Valley Water Company (Pipelaying and Other Works) (Code of Practice) Order 1989 (S.I. 1989/2144)
- Design Right (Semiconductor Topographies) (Amendment) Regulations 1989 (S.I. 1989/2147)
- Meat and Meat Products (Hormonal Substances) (Scotland) Regulations 1989 (S.I. 1989/2157)
- Revenue Support Grant (Specified Bodies) Regulations 1989 (S.I. 1989/2161)
- Guarantee Payments (Exemption) (No. 26) Order 1989 (S.I. 1989/2163)
- Insider Dealing (Public Servants) Order 1989 (S.I. 1989/2164)
- Insider Dealing (Recognised Stock Exchange) Order 1989 (S.I. 1989/2165)
- Commons Registration (General) (Amendment) Regulations 1989 (S.I. 1989/2167)
- Food Protection (Emergency Prohibitions) (Contamination of Feeding Stuff) (England) (No.3) Amendment No.2 Order 1989 (S.I. 1989/2168)
- Pressure Systems and Transportable Gas Containers Regulations 1989 (S.I. 1989/2169)
- Insolvency Practitioners (Amendment) (No.2) Regulations 1989 (S.I. 1989/2170)
- Local Government and Housing Act 1989 (Commencement No.1) Order 1989 (S.I. 1989/2180)
- Food Protection (Emergency Prohibitions) (Contamination of Feeding Stuff) (Wales) (No. 3) Amendment Order 1989 (S.I. 1989/2181)
- Public Telecommunication System Designation (East London Telecommunications Limited) Order 1989 (S.I. 1989/2182)
- Goods Vehicles (Operators' Licences) (Temporary Use in Great Britain) (Amendment) Regulations 1989 (S.I. 1989/2183)
- Goods Vehicles (Authorisation of International Journeys) (Fees) (Amendment) (No.2) Regulations 1989 (S.I. 1989/2184)
- Local Government and Housing Act 1989 (Commencement No. 2) Order 1989 (S.I. 1989/2186)
- A11 Trunk Road (Red Lodge Bypass and Slip Roads) Order 1989 (S.I. 1989/2187)
- Public Lending Right Scheme 1982 (Commencement of Variations) Order 1989 (S.I. 1989/2188)
- County Council of Suffolk (Mutford Bridges) Scheme 1989 Confirmation Instrument 1989 (S.I. 1989/2189)
- Gaming Act (Variation of Monetary Limits) (No. 2) Order 1989 (S.I. 1989/2190)
- County Council of Avon (M32 Motorway (Hambrook Interchange to Lower Ashley Road Interchange) and Connecting Roads) (Revocation) Scheme 1989 Confirmation Instrument 1989 (S.I. 1989/2191)
- Wirral Metropolitan Borough Council M53 Motorway (Moreton Spur Extension to Upton Bypass) Scheme 1988 Confirmation Instrument 1989 (S.I. 1989/2192)
- Food Protection (Emergency Prohibitions) (Contamination of Feeding Stuff) (England) (No. 3) Amendment No. 3 Order 1989 (S.I. 1989/2193)
- Pyramid Selling Schemes Regulations 1989 (S.I. 1989/2195)
- Import and Export (Plant Health Fees) (Scotland) Order 1989 (S.I. 1989/2196)

== 2201–2300 ==
- Town and Country Planning (Central Manchester Urban Development Area) Special Development Order 1989 (S.I. 1989/2203)
- Town and Country Planning (Sheffield Urban Development Area) Special Development Order 1989 (S.I. 1989/2204)
- Town and Country Planning (Bristol Urban Development Area) Special Development Order 1989 (S.I. 1989/2205)
- Town and Country Planning (Leeds Urban Development Area) Special Development Order 1989 (S.I. 1989/2206)
- Classification, Packaging and Labelling of Dangerous Substances (Amendment) Regulations 1989 (S.I. 1989/2208)
- Construction (Head Protection) Regulations 1989 (S.I. 1989/2209)
- Suppression of Terrorism Act 1978 (Designation of Countries) Order 1989 (S.I. 1989/2210)
- Gipsy Encampments (Metropolitan District of Doncaster) Order 1989 (S.I. 1989/2211)
- Preservatives in Food (Scotland) Amendment Regulations 1989 (S.I. 1989/2216)
- Taunton – Fraddon Trunk Road A361 (Landkey Link) (Detrunking) Order 1989 (S.I. 1989/2218)
- Industrial Training Levy (Hotel and Catering) Order 1989 (S.I. 1989/2219)
- Civil Aviation (Canadian Navigation Services) (Second Amendment) Regulations 1989 (S.I. 1989/2220)
- Civil Aviation (Joint Financing) (Amendment) Regulations 1989 (S.I. 1989/2221)
- Police (Scotland) Amendment Regulations 1989 (S.I. 1989/2222)
- Local Statutory Provisions (Postponement of Repeal) (Scotland) Order 1989 (S.I. 1989/2223)
- Cosmetic Products (Safety) Regulations 1989 (S.I. 1989/2233)
- Personal Community Charge (Exemption for the Severely Mentally Impaired) (Scotland) Regulations 1989 (S.I. 1989/2234)
- Combined Probation Areas (West Sussex) (No.2) Order 1989 (S.I. 1989/2238)
- Food Protection (Emergency Prohibitions) (Contamination of Feeding Stuff) (England) (No. 4) Order 1989 (S.I. 1989/2239)
- Combined Probation Areas (Lancashire) Order 1989 (S.I. 1989/2240)
- Combined Probation Areas (Warwickshire) Order 1989 (S.I. 1989/2241)
- Education (Higher Education Corporations) (No. 6) Order 1989 (S.I. 1989/2242)
- Local Government Act 1988 (Defined Activities) (Exemption) (England) Order 1989 (S.I. 1989/2243)
- Value Added Tax (Accounting and Records) Regulations 1989 (S.I. 1989/2248)
- Gaming Act (Variation of Monetary Limits) (Scotland) (No.2) Order 1989 (S.I. 1989/2249)
- Public Health (Notification of Infectious Diseases) (Scotland) Amendment Regulations 1989 (S.I. 1989/2250)
- Plant Health (Great Britain) (Amendment) (No. 3) Order 1989 (S.I. 1989/2251)
- Customs Duty (Personal Reliefs) (Amendment) Order 1989 (S.I. 1989/2252)
- Excise Duties (Small Non-Commercial Consignments) Relief (Amendment) Regulations 1989 (S.I. 1989/2253)
- Gaming Machine Licence Duty (Variation of Monetary Limits and Exemptions) Order 1989 (S.I. 1989/2254)
- Value Added Tax (Bad Debt Relief) (Amendment) Regulations 1989 (S.I. 1989/2255)
- Value Added Tax (General) (Amendment) (No. 3) Regulations 1989 (S.I. 1989/2256)
- Civil Aviation (Route Charges for Navigation Services) (Amendment) Regulations 1989 (S.I. 1989/2257)
- Supply of Beer (Loan Ties, Licensed Premises and Wholesale Prices) Order 1989 (SI 1989/2258)
- Value Added Tax (Do-It-Yourself Builders) (Refund of Tax) Regulations 1989 (S.I. 1989/2259)
- Non-Domestic Rating (Collection and Enforcement) (Central Lists) Regulations 1989 (S.I. 1989/2260)
- Non-Domestic Rating (Unoccupied Property) Regulations 1989 (S.I. 1989/2261)
- Motor Vehicles (Type Approval) (Amendment) (No.2) Regulations 1989 (S.I. 1989/2262)
- Central Rating Lists Regulations 1989 (S.I. 1989/2263)
- A47 Leicester—Great Yarmouth Trunk Road (Easton-Postwick), A11 London—Norwich Trunk Road (Cringleford—Mile End Road), A140 Ipswich—Norwich Trunk Road (South of Norwich Road—Daniels Road) (Norwich Southern Bypass) Detrunking Order 1989 (S.I. 1989/2264)
- A47 Leicester-Great Yarmouth Trunk Road (Norwich Southern Bypass and Slip Roads) (Southern and Eastern Section) Order 1989 (S.I. 1989/2265)
- A47 Leicester-Great Yarmouth Trunk Road (Norwich Southern Bypass) (River Yare Bridge) Order 1989 (S.I. 1989/2266)
- Occupational Pensions (Revaluation) Order 1989 (S.I. 1989/2267)
- Charging Authorities (Population for Precepts) (Wales) Regulations 1989 (S.I. 1989/2268)
- Food Protection (Emergency Prohibitions) (Contamination of Feeding Stuff) (Wales) (No. 4) Order 1989 (S.I. 1989/2269)
- Finance Act 1985 (Serious Misdeclaration and Interest on Tax) (Appointed Days) Order 1989 (S.I. 1989/2270)
- Finance Act 1989 (Recovery of Overpaid Tax and Administration) (Appointed Days) Order 1989 (S.I. 1989/2271)
- Value Added Tax (Finance, Health and Welfare) Order 1989 (S.I. 1989/2272)
- Value Added Tax (Small Non-Commercial Consignments) Relief (Amendment) Order 1989 (S.I. 1989/2273)
- Community Charges (Miscellaneous Provisions) (No. 2) Regulations 1989 (S.I. 1989/2274)
- Agricultural or Forestry Tractors and Tractor Components (Type Approval) (Amendment) Regulations 1989 (S.I. 1989/2275)
- Apple and Pear Development Council (Dissolution) Order 1989 (S.I. 1989/2276)
- Apple and Pear Research Council Order 1989 (S.I. 1989/2277)
- Water Act 1989 (Commencement No.4) Order 1989 (S.I. 1989/2278)
- Lancashire County Council (Improvement of Eanam/Higher Eanam, Blackburn – New Eanam Canal Bridge) Scheme 1987 Confirmation Instrument 1989 (S.I. 1989/2279)
- Surface Waters (Dangerous Substances) (Classification) Regulations 1989 (S.I. 1989/2286)
- Preservatives in Food (Amendment) Regulations 1989 (S.I. 1989/2287)
- All-Terrain Motor Vehicles (Safety) Regulations 1989 (S.I. 1989/2288)
- Pension Scheme Surpluses (Valuation) (Amendment) Regulations 1989 (S.I. 1989/2290)
- Borough of Tonbridge and Malling (Electoral Arrangements) Order 1989 (S.I. 1989/2291)
- County Councils (Library Authority Expenses) (Wales) Order 1989 (S.I. 1989/2292)
- Transport Act 1985 (Extension of Eligibility for Travel Concessions) (Amendment) Order 1989 (S.I. 1989/2293)
- Protection of Wrecks (Designation No.2) Order 1989 (S.I. 1989/2294)
- Protection of Wrecks (Designation No. 3) Order 1989 (S.I. 1989/2295)

== 2301–2400 ==
- Animals (Scientific Procedures) Act (Fees) Order 1989 (S.I. 1989/2302)
- Non-Domestic Rating (Miscellaneous Provisions) (No. 2) Regulations 1989 (S.I. 1989/2303)
- Non-Domestic Ratepayers (Consultation) Regulations 1989 (S.I. 1989/2304)
- Charging Authorities (Notification of Precept Population) (Wales) Regulations 1989 (S.I. 1989/2305)
- Animals (Scientific Procedures) Act 1986 (Commencement No. 2) Order 1989 (S.I. 1989/2306)
- Inshore Fishing (Prohibition of Fishing and Fishing Methods) (Scotland) Order 1989 (S.I. 1989/2307)
- Teaching Council (Scotland) Election Scheme 1989 Approval Order 1989 (S.I. 1989/2308)
- Housing Revenue Account General Fund Contribution Limits (Scotland) Order 1989 (S.I. 1989/2310)
- Employment Act 1989 (Amendments and Revocations) Order 1989 (S.I. 1989/2311)
- Offices, Shops and Railway Premises Act 1963 (Commencement No. 3) Order 1989 (S.I. 1989/2312)
- Suppression of Terrorism Act 1978 (Application of Provisions) (Republic of Ireland) Order 1989 (S.I. 1989/2313)
- Reservoirs Act 1975 (Application Fees) (Amendment) Regulations 1989 (S.I. 1989/2314)
- A5/A49 Trunk Roads (Shrewsbury Bypass and Improvements) (Temporary Bridge over the River Severn at Uffington, Shrewsbury) Order 1989 (S.I. 1989/2315)
- (AS) London-Holyhead Trunk Road and Slip Roads and the (A49) Newport-Shrewsbury-Whitchurch-Warrington Trunk Road (A5/A49 Shrewsbury By-Pass and Improvements) Order 1985 (Emstrey Amendment) Order 1989 (S.I. 1989/2316)
- (A5) London–Holyhead Trunk Road and Slip Roads and the (A49) Newport–Shrewsbury–Whitchurch– Warrington Trunk Road (A5/A49 Shrewsbury By-Pass and Improvements) Order 1985 (Sutton Hall Amendment) Order 1989 (S.I. 1989/2317)
- Medicines (Veterinary Drugs) (Pharmacy and Merchants' List) (No. 2) Order 1989 (S.I. 1989/2318)
- Medicines (Veterinary Drugs) (Prescription Only) Order 1989 (S.I. 1989/2319)
- Medicines (Medicated Animal Feeding Stuffs) Regulations 1989 (S.I. 1989/2320)
- Caseins and Caseinates (Amendment) Regulations 1989 (S.I. 1989/2321)
- Medicines (Exemption from Licences) (Wholesale Dealing) Order 1989 (S.I. 1989/2322)
- Medicines (Exemption from Licences) (Special and Transitional Cases) (Amendment) Order 1989 (S.I. 1989/2323)
- Medicines (Animal Feeding Stuffs) (Enforcement) (Amendment) Regulations 1989 (S.I. 1989/2324)
- Medicines (Exemptions from Licences) (Intermediate Medicated Feeding Stuffs) Order 1989 (S.I. 1989/2325)
- Bovine Spongiform Encephalopathy (No. 2) Amendment Order 1989 (S.I. 1989/2326)
- Export of Goods (Control) (Amendment No. 6) Order 1989 (S.I. 1989/2327)
- Home Purchase Assistance (Recognised Lending Institutions) (No. 3) Order 1989 (S.I. 1989/2328)
- Housing (Right to Buy) (Priority of Charges) (No. 3) Order 1989 (S.I. 1989/2329)
- Mortgage Indemnities (Recognised Bodies) (No. 3) Order 1989 (S.I. 1989/2330)
- Non-Domestic Rating (Stud Farms) Order 1989 (S.I. 1989/2331)
- A3 Trunk Road (Roehampton Vale, Wandsworth) (Speed Limits) Order 1989 (S.I. 1989/2332)
- Education (Publication of Schemes for Financing Schools) Regulations 1989 (S.I. 1989/2335)
- Collection Fund (England) Regulations 1989 (S.I. 1989/2336)
- Consumer Credit (Exempt Agreements) (Amendment) (No.2) Order 1989 (S.I. 1989/2337)
- Income Tax (Reduced and Composite Rate) Order 1989 (S.I. 1989/2339)
- Income Support (Transitional) Amendment No. 2 Regulations 1989 (S.I. 1989/2340)
- Channel Tunnel Act (Competition) Order 1989 (S.I. 1989/2345)
- Oral Snuff (Safety) Regulations 1989 (S.I. 1989/2347)
- A34 Winchester-Preston Trunk Road (North of Oxford to Monkspath) De-Trunking Order 1989 (S.I. 1989/2348)
- A41 London–Birmingham Trunk Road (Bicester to South of Knowle) De-Trunking Order 1989 (S.I. 1989/2349)
- A43 Oxford—Market Deeping Trunk Road (Weston-on-the-Green to South of Baynard's Green) De-Trunking Order 1989 (S.I. 1989/2350)
- A423 North of Oxford–South of Coventry Trunk Road (Kidlington to East Adderbury) De-Trunking Order 1989 (S.I. 1989/2351)
- Essex and Suffolk (County Boundaries) Order 1989 (S.I. 1989/2352)
- Value Added Tax (General) (Amendment) (No.4) Regulations 1989 (S.I. 1989/2355)
- Furniture and Furnishings (Fire) (Safety) (Amendment) Regulations 1989 (S.I. 1989/2358)
- Public Service Vehicles (Conditions of Fitness, Equipment, Use and Certification) (Amendment) Regulations 1989 (S.I. 1989/2359)
- Road Vehicles (Construction and Use) (Amendment) (No. 4) Regulations 1989 (S.I. 1989/2360)
- Valuation (Stud Farms) (Scotland) Order 1989 (S.I. 1989/2361)
- Community Water Charges (Scotland) Amendment Regulations 1989 (S.I. 1989/2362)
- Collection Fund (Wales) Regulations 1989 (S.I. 1989/2363)
- Commonwealth Development Corporation (Additional Enterprises) (Variation) Order 1989 (S.I. 1989/2364)
- Public Telecommunication System Designation (West Country Cable Limited) Order 1989 (S.I. 1989/2365)
- Teachers' Pay and Conditions Act 1987 (Continuation) Order 1989 (S.I. 1989/2366)
- Health and Safety (Fees) (Amendment) Regulations 1989 (S.I. 1989/2367)
- Marriage Fees (Scotland) Regulations 1989 (S.I. 1989/2368)
- Health and Medicines Act 1988 (Superannuation) (Savings for Retired Practitioners) (Scotland) Regulations 1989 (S.I. 1989/2369)
- Registration of Births, Deaths and Marriages (Fees) (Scotland) Order 1989 (S.I. 1989/2370)
- Registration of Births, Deaths, Marriages and Divorces (Fees) (Scotland) Regulations 1989 (S.I. 1989/2371)
- Dartford–Thurrock Crossing Regulations 1989 (S.I. 1989/2372)
- Export of Goods (Control) Order 1989 (S.I. 1989/2376)
- Sutton District Water Company (Constitution and Regulation) Order 1989 (S.I. 1989/2379)
- Financial Services (Designated Countries and Territories) (Overseas Insurance Companies) Order 1989 (S.I. 1989/2380)
- A12 London – Great Yarmouth Trunk Road (Gorleston Relief Road and Slip Roads) Order 1989 (S.I. 1989/2381)
- Milk and Dairies (Semi-skimmed and Skimmed Milk) (Heat Treatment and Labelling) (Amendment) Regulations 1989 (S.I. 1989/2382)
- Milk (Special Designation) Regulations 1989 (S.I. 1989/2383)
- Foreign Fields (Specification) Order 1989 (S.I. 1989/2384)
- Valuation Roll and Valuation Notice (Scotland) Order 1989 (S.I. 1989/2385)
- Valuation Timetable (Scotland) Order 1989 (S.I. 1989/2386)
- Private Medical Insurance (Tax Relief) Regulations 1989 (S.I. 1989/2387)
- Social Fund Cold Weather Payments (General) Amendment Regulations 1989 (S.I. 1989/2388)
- Private Medical Insurance (Disentitlement to Tax Relief and Approved Benefits) Regulations 1989 Laid before the House of Commons S.I. 1989/2389)
- Supply of Beer (Tied Estate) Order 1989 (SI 1989/2390)
- European Communities (Designation) (No. 2) Order 1989 (S.I. 1989/2393)
- Exempt Charities Order 1989 (S.I. 1989/2394)
- Air Navigation (Overseas Territories) Order 1989 (S.I. 1989/2395)
- Brunei (Appeals) Order 1989 (S.I. 1989/2396)
- Cayman Islands (Territorial Sea) Order 1989 (S.I. 1989/2397)
- Continental Shelf (Designation of Areas) Order 1989 (S.I. 1989/2398)
- Falkland Islands Courts (Overseas Jurisdiction) Order 1989 (S.I. 1989/2399)
- Merchant Shipping Act 1979 (Overseas Territories) Order 1989 (S.I. 1989/2400)

== 2401–2500 ==
- Montserrat Constitution Order 1989 (S.I. 1989/2401)
- Appropriation (No. 4) (Northern Ireland) Order 1989 (S.I. 1989/2402)
- Broadcasting Act 1981 (Isle of Man) Order 1989 (S.I. 1989/2403)
- Companies (Northern Ireland) Order 1989 (S.I. 1989/2404)
- Insolvency (Northern Ireland) Order 1989 (S.I. 1989/2405)
- Education Reform(Northern Ireland) Order 1989 (S.I. 1989/2406)
- Fishery Limits Act 1976 (Guernsey) Order 1989 (S.I. 1989/2407)
- Human Organ Transplants (Northern Ireland) Order 1989 (S.I. 1989/2408)
- Insolvency Act 1986 (Guernsey) Order 1989 (S.I. 1989/2409)
- Merchant Shipping (Distress Signals and Prevention of Collisions) (Guernsey) Order 1989 (S.I. 1989/2410)
- Sea Fish (Conservation) (Channel Islands) (Amendment) Order 1989 (S.I. 1989/2411)
- Sea Fisheries (Channel Islands) (Amendment) Order 1989 (S.I. 1989/2412)
- Youth Service (Northern Ireland) Order 1989 (S.I. 1989/2413)
- King George's Fund for Sailors (Amendment of Charter) Order 1989 (S.I. 1989/2414)
- Copyright (Application to Other Countries) (No. 2) (Amendment) Order 1989 (S.I. 1989/2415)
- Ministerial and other Salaries Order 1989 (S.I. 1989/2416)
- Friendly Societies (Modification of the Corporation Tax Acts) Regulations 1989 (S.I. 1989/2417)
- Education (Higher Education Corporations) (No. 7) Order 1989 (S.I. 1989/2418)
- Borough of Colchester (Electoral Arrangements) Order 1989 (S.I. 1989/2419)
- Sex Discrimination Act 1975 (Exemption of Police Federation Constitutional and Electoral Arrangements) Order 1989 (S.I. 1989/2420)
- Customs Duties (ECSC) (Quota and Other Reliefs) Order 1989 (S.I. 1989/2421)
- River Hamble Harbour Revision Order 1989 (S.I. 1989/2422)
- Credit Unions (Increase in Limits of Shareholding, of Deposits by persons too young to be members and of Loans) Order 1989 (S.I. 1989/2423)
- Community Charges (Notification of Deaths) Regulations 1989 (S.I. 1989/2424)
- Disabled Persons (Services, Consultation and Representation) Act 1986 (Commencement No. 5) Order 1989 (S.I. 1989/2425)
- County Court (Amendment No. 4) Rules 1989 (S.I. 1989/2426)
- Rules of the Supreme Court (Amendment No. 4) 1989 (S.I. 1989/2427)
- Portland Harbour Fishery Order 1989 (S.I. 1989/2428)
- Petty Sessional Divisions (North Yorkshire) Order 1989 (S.I. 1989/2429)
- The East Devon (Parishes) Order 1989 S.I. 1989/2430
- Veterinary Surgeons and Veterinary Practitioners (Registration) (Amendment) Regulations Order of Council 1989 (S.I. 1989/2431)
- Merger Reference (Blue Circle, Yale and Myson) (Revocation) Order 1989 (S.I. 1989/2432)
- Sports Grounds and Sporting Events (Designation) (Scotland) Amendment Order 1989 (S.I. 1989/2433)
- Safety of Sports Grounds (Designation) (Scotland) Order 1989 (S.I. 1989/2434)
- Non-Domestic Rating Contributions (England) Regulations 1989 (S.I. 1989/2435)
- Non-Domestic Rates and Community Charges (Timetable) (Scotland) Amendment Regulations 1989 (S.I. 1989/2436)
- Standard Community Charge (Scotland) Regulations 1989 (S.I. 1989/2437)
- Excise Duties (Hydrocarbon Oil) (Travelling Showmen) Relief Regulations 1989 (S.I. 1989/2439)
- Non-Domestic Rating Contributions (Wales) Regulations 1989 (S.I. 1989/2441)
- Medicines (Intermediate Medicated Feeding Stuffs) Order 1989 (S.I. 1989/2442)
- Undersized Crabs (Variation) Order 1989 (S.I. 1989/2443)
- National Savings Bank (Investment Deposits) (Limits) (Amendment) Order 1989 (S.I. 1989/2444)
- Local Government and Housing Act 1989 (Commencement No. 3) Order 1989 (S.I. 1989/2445)
- Education Support Grants (Amendment) Regulations 1989 (S.I. 1989/2446)
- Mackerel (Specified Sea Areas) (Prohibition of Fishing) Order 1989 (S.I. 1989/2447)
- Electricity Act 1989 (Nominated Companies) (Scotland) Order 1989 (S.I. 1989/2448)
- Anglerfish (Specified Sea Areas) (Prohibition of Fishing) Order 1989 (S.I. 1989/2449)
- Brunei (Appeals) Act 1989 (Commencement) Order 1989 S.I. 1989/2450)
- Town and Country Planning (Liverpool and Wirral Urban Development Area) Special Development Order 1989 (S.I. 1989/2454)
- A30 Trunk Road (Eastern Green to Market Place, Penzance) (Detrunking) Order 1989 (S.I. 1989/2455)
- Non-Domestic Rates (Scotland) Regulations 1989 (S.I. 1989/2462)
- Limits on Rent Increases (Housing Associations) (Scotland) Order 1989 (S.I. 1989/2468)
- Limits on Rent Increases (Scotland) Order 1989 (S.I. 1989/2469)
- Merseyside Residuary Body (Winding Up) Order 1989 (S.I. 1989/2470)
- British Gas plc (Rateable Values) Order 1989 (S.I. 1989/2471)
- British Waterways Board (Rateable Values) Order 1989 (S.I. 1989/2472)
- Docks and Harbours (Rateable Values) Order 1989 (S.I. 1989/2473)
- Electricity Generators (Rateable Values) Order 1989 (S.I. 1989/2474)
- Electricity Supply Industry (Rateable Values) Order 1989 (S.I. 1989/2475)
- Non-Domestic Rating (Transitional Period) (Appropriate Fraction) Order 1989 (S.I. 1989/2476)
- Railways (Rateable Values) Order 1989 (SI 1989/2477)
- Telecommunications Industry (Rateable Values) Order 1989 (S.I. 1989/2478)
- Water Undertakers (Rateable Values) Order 1989 (S.I. 1989/2479)
- Human Organ Transplants (Unrelated Persons) Regulations 1989 (S.I. 1989/2480)
- Local Government Act 1988 (Competition in Sports and Leisure Facilities) Order 1989 (S.I. 1989/2488)
- Oldham Metropolitan Borough Council (A627(M) Rochdale-Lancashire/Yorkshire Motorway (M62)-Oldham Special Roads) Revocation Scheme 1989 Confirmation Instrument 1989 (S.I. 1989/2490)
- Rochdale Borough Council (A627(M) Rochdale—Lancashire/Yorkshire Motorway (M62)—Oldham Special Roads) Revocation Scheme 1989 Confirmation Instrument 1989 (S.I. 1989/2491)
- Caernarfon Harbour Revision Order 1989 (S.I. 1989/2493)
- Submarine Pipe-lines (Designated Owners) (No. 26) Order 1989 (S.I. 1989/2495)
- Submarine Pipe-lines (Designated Owners) (No. 27) Order 1989 (S.I. 1989/2496)
- Submarine Pipe-lines (Designated Owners) (No. 28) Order 1989 (S.I. 1989/2497)
- Submarine Pipe-lines (Designated Owners) (No. 29) Order 1989 (S.I. 1989/2498)
- Submarine Pipe-lines (Designated Owners) (No. 30) Order 1989 (S.I. 1989/2499)
- Submarine Pipe-lines (Designated Owners) (No. 31) Order 1989 (S.I. 1989/2500)

== 2501–2600 ==
- Submarine Pipe-lines (Designated Owners) (No. 32) Order 1989 (S.I. 1989/2501)
- Submarine Pipe-lines (Designated Owners) (No. 33) Order 1989 (S.I. 1989/2502)
- Submarine Pipe-lines (Designated Owners) (No. 34) Order 1989 (S.I. 1989/2503)
- Submarine Pipe-lines (Designated Owners) (No. 35) Order 1989 (S.I. 1989/2504)
- Submarine Pipe-lines (Designated Owners) (No. 36) Order 1989 (S.I. 1989/2505)
- Submarine Pipe-lines (Designated Owners) (No. 37) Order 1989 (S.I. 1989/2506)
- Submarine Pipe-lines (Designated Owners) (No. 38) Order 1989 (S.I. 1989/2507)
- Submarine Pipe-lines (Designated Owners) (No. 39) Order 1989 (S.I. 1989/2508)
- Copyright (Recording for Archives of Designated Class of Broadcasts and Cable Programmes) (Designated Bodies) (No. 2) Order 1989 (S.I. 1989/2510)

== See also ==
- List of statutory instruments of the United Kingdom
