= Atomic Energy Act =

Atomic Energy Act may refer to:

== United Kingdom legislation ==
- Atomic Energy Act 1946
- Atomic Energy (Miscellaneous Provisions) Act 1981
- Atomic Energy Act 1989

== United States legislation ==
- Atomic Energy Act of 1946
- Atomic Energy Act of 1954

== See also ==
- Atomic Energy Authority Act
- Energy law
- List of short titles
