= National Institute for Research in Nuclear Science =

UK Government establishment

- Successor: Nuclear Physics Board
- Formation: 1957
- Dissolved: 1965
- Type: Governmental Organisation
- Purpose: Nuclear Energy Research
- Headquarters: Harwell
- Services: Provision of facilities and equipment for nuclear research
- Fields: Atomic Energy
- Chairman: Lord Bridges

The National Institute for Research in Nuclear Science was a UK Government establishment that provided equipment and facilities for nuclear research that would otherwise be beyond the financial capability of individual universities and other nuclear research establishments. It operated from 1957 to 1965.

== Establishment ==
The Institute was established in March 1957 by the UK Government after consultation with the University Grants Committee, the Atomic Energy Authority and Government Research Departments. It had four objectives:

- to provide common facilities beyond the scope of individual universities and institutions carrying out research in nuclear science;
- to encourage the use of the facilities by scientists from universities, the United Kingdom Atomic Energy Authority (UKAEA), and industrial laboratories;
- to co-operate with UKAEA to address specific problems requiring the use of these facilities;
- to develop the Institute as a national asset for training scientists and engineers, and to disseminate scientific and technical knowledge.

The Institute was granted its Royal Charter on 7 May 1958.

== Governance ==
The governing board comprised:

- Chairman (Lord Bridges);
- 7 members representing Universities;
- 2 members representing the University Grants Committee;
- 1 member representing the Royal Society;
- 3 members representing the UKAEA;
- 2 members representing the Department of Scientific and Industrial Research.

== Operation ==
The Institute’s first laboratory was the Rutherford High Energy Laboratory adjacent to the UKAEA Site. Equipment at the laboratory included a proton linear accelerator and a synchrotron. It was envisaged that the machines would be operated by Institute staff for research workers.

In 1961 the Rutherford Laboratory of the National Institute for Research in Nuclear Science assumed responsibility for developing particle accelerators, from the Atomic Energy Research Establishment at Harwell. The annual budget for the National Institute in 1961 was £6,211,000.

A second laboratory was opened at Daresbury near Warrington in 1962.

The model developed by the National Institute of providing expensive equipment for the use of researchers was adopted elsewhere. The Advisory Council on Scientific Policy suggested that a number of national institutes should be established, for example in Radio Astronomy.

The rationalisation of the structure of government sponsored civil science was proposed in 1963. However, the change of government in 1964 delayed the implementation of the necessary legislation.

=== Dissolution ===
The Science and Technology Act 1965 established the Science Research Council. The Council took over the functions of the National Institute for Research in Nuclear Science, and established a Nuclear Physics Board which supervised the activities formerly undertaken by the National Institute.

The documentary records of the National Institute for Research in Nuclear Science are held by The National Archives in class AY 33.

== See also ==
- Atomic Energy Authority Act
- United Kingdom Atomic Energy Authority
- Nuclear power in the United Kingdom
- Atomic Energy Research Establishment
- Science Research Council
