= Atomic Energy Authority Act 1959 =

Act of the Parliament of the United Kingdom

Atomic Energy Authority Act 1959 (Note: Section 4.)
- Act of Parliament
- Parliament of the United Kingdom
- Long title: An Act to increase the maximum number of members of the United Kingdom Atomic Energy Authority, and to enable the Authority to include in their pension schemes staff of the National Institute for Research in Nuclear Science.
- Citation: 8 & 9 Eliz. 2. c. 5
- Introduced by: 18 November 1959 (Second Reading) by Sir David Eccles (Commons); 3 December 1959 (Second Reading) by Viscount Hailsham (Lords)
- Territorial extent: United Kingdom

Dates
- Royal assent: 17 December 1959
- Commencement: 17 December 1959 (Note: The Acts of Parliament (Commencement) Act 1793.)
Other legislation
Amends	Atomic Energy Authority Act 1954
Amended by	Science and Technology Act 1965

Status: Amended

Text of statute as originally enacted

Revised text of statute as amended

Text of the Atomic Energy Authority Act 1959 as in force today (including any amendments) within the United Kingdom, from legislation.gov.uk.

The Atomic Energy Authority Act 1959 (8 & 9 Eliz. 2. c. 5) is an act of the Parliament of the United Kingdom which amended and extended the constitution and powers of the United Kingdom Atomic Energy Authority.

== Background ==
The Atomic Energy Authority Act 1954 (2 & 3 Eliz. 2. c. 32) had established the United Kingdom Atomic Energy Authority (UKAEA). The work of the Authority had increased over the five years since it was founded. For example, the number of staff had increased from 17,000 to 37,000. There had also been internal reorganisation of divisions. The Authority therefore thought it was expedient to make provision for a greater number of members on its governing body.

The National Institute for Research in Nuclear Science, was established in 1957 to manage research into nuclear physics undertaken by the UKAEA. However, there was no provision for staff to benefit from the Authority’s pension scheme.

== Provisions ==
The Atomic Energy Authority Act 1959 received royal assent on 17 December 1959. Its long title is: ’An Act to increase the maximum number of members of the United Kingdom Atomic Energy Authority, and to enable the Authority to include in their pension schemes staff of the National Institute for Research in Nuclear Science.’

The act comprises four sections.

- Section 1. Increase of maximum number of members of Authority. The 1954 Act had specified that the Authority shall consist of a Chairman and not more than 10 members. The 1959 Act increased this to not more than 15.
- Section 2. Provision of pensions for staff of the National Institute for Research in Nuclear Science. Applied the provisions of UKAEA’s pension to staff of the Institute.
- Section 3. Expenses. Additional expenses resulting from this Act were to be defrayed from money’s provided by Parliament.
- Section 4. Short title and citation. Atomic Energy Authority Act 1959.

== Subsequent developments ==
The act was amended by the Science and Technology Act 1965 (c. 4).

== See also ==
- Atomic Energy Authority Act
- United Kingdom Atomic Energy Authority
- Nuclear power in the United Kingdom
- Atomic Energy Research Establishment

== Bibliography ==
- "The Atomic Energy Authority Act, 1959". Halsbury's Statutes of England. Second Edition. Butterworth & Co (Publishers) Ltd. 1960. Volume 39 (Continuation Volume 1959). pp 1314 & 1315. See also pp 1304 & 1324.
- "The Atomic Energy Authority Act 1959". Halsbury's Statutes of England. Third Edition. Butterworths. London. 1972. Volume 37. Page 400. See also pp 8, 369, 387 & 397.
- Halsbury's Statutes of England and Wales. Fourth Edition. 2009 Reissue. LexisNexis. Volume 17(1). Page 325. See also pp 27, 60, 106, 110 & 117.
- "Atomic Energy Authority Act, 1959". Current Law Statutes Annotated 1959. Sweet & Maxwell. Stevens & Sons. London. W Green & Son. Edinburgh. Page 8 E 2 c 5/1-4.
- "Atomic Energy Authority Act, 1959" in "The Statutes 1959-60" (1960) 230 The Law Times 145 (9 September 1960)
- "Atomic Energy Authority Act 1959" in "Statutes" in "Weekly Review" (1960) 110 The Law Journal 136 (26 February 1960)
- "Atomic Energy Authority Act, 1959" (1960) Notes on Current Politics, issues 13-24, p 6
- Halsbury's Laws of England. Fourth Edition. 2007 Reissue. LexisNexis Butterworths. Volume 19(3). para 1364 at p 56, and para 1375 at p 64.
- F R Frame and Harry Street. Law Relating to Nuclear Energy. Butterworths. London. 1966. pp 18, 19 & 225.
- Nuclear Legislation: Analytical Study. OEDC. 1969. p 213.
- John J Clarke. "Atomic Energy Authority Act, 1959". Outlines of Central Government. Fourteenth Edition. Sir Isaac Pitman & Sons. London. 1965. pp 88 & 89.
- G Eaves. Principles of Radiation Protection. (Nuclear reactor technology series, vol 2). Iliffe Books. London. 1964. p 156.
- I G Anderson. Councils, Committees, & Boards. Edition 4. CBD Research. 1980. p 333.
- W Thornhill. The Nationalized Industries. Nelson. 1968. p 233.
- British Industry, 1967, p 15
- "Atomic Energy Authority Act, 1959" Whitaker's Almanack. 1961. p 348.
- Joint Committee on Atomic Energy. Scientific Research in Great Britain. United States Government Printing Office. Washington. 1960. p 283.
- Energy Research Abstracts. Volume 7. No 05. p 1273.
- Is it in Force?, Winter 2007, p 88.
