= Atomic Energy Authority (Special Constables) Act 1976 =

Act of the Parliament of the United Kingdom

Atomic Energy Authority (Special Constables) Act 1976 (Note: Section 4(1).)
- Act of Parliament
- Parliament of the United Kingdom
- Long title: An Act to extend the powers relating to firearms of special constables appointed on the nomination of the United Kingdom Atomic Energy Authority; to extend the property in respect of which, and the places where, they may exercise those and their other powers; to make certain minor amendments about their powers; and for connected purposes.
- Citation: 1976 c. 23
- Introduced by: Secretary of State for Energy (Mr. Anthony Wedgwood Benn) Second Reading 26 February 1976 (Commons)
- Territorial extent: England and Wales; Scotland; (Note: Section 4(4).)

Dates
- Royal assent: 10 June 1976
- Commencement: 10 June 1976 (Note: The Acts of Parliament (Commencement) Act 1793.)
- Repealed: 1 April 2005 (Note: The Energy Act 2004 (Commencement No. 5) Order 2005 (SI 2005/877).)
Other legislation
Amends	Atomic Energy Authority Act 1954; Nuclear Installations Act 1965; Atomic Energy Authority Act 1971
Repealed by	Anti-terrorism, Crime and Security Act 2001; Energy Act 2004

Status: Repealed

Text of statute as originally enacted

Revised text of statute as amended

The Atomic Energy Authority (Special Constables) Act 1976 (c. 23) was an act of the Parliament of the United Kingdom. The effect of the act was to extend and amend the powers of special constables carrying firearms and the places that they may exercise their powers.

== Rationale ==
The act was intended to address the potential impact of terrorism at places where nuclear material was stored or used.

The act received royal assent on 10th June 1976.

== Provisions ==
The act comprised four sections:

- Section 1. Extension of powers of special constables as regards firearms.
- Section 2. Extension of property in respect of which special constables may exercise their powers.
- Section 3. Extension of places where special constables may exercise their powers.
- Section 4. Citation, interpretation, minor amendments and extent.

== Subsequent developments ==
Section 3 of the act was repealed by section 125 of, and part 5 of schedule 8 to, the Anti-terrorism, Crime and Security Act 2001, which came into force on 14 December 2001.

Sections 1, 2 and 4 of the act were repealed on 1 April 2005 under the provisions of the Energy Act 2004.

== See also ==
- United Kingdom Atomic Energy Authority Constabulary
- United Kingdom Atomic Energy Authority
- Atomic Energy Authority Act
- Atomic Energy Research Establishment
- Atomic Weapons Research Establishment
- Nuclear weapons and the United Kingdom
