= Atomic Energy (Miscellaneous Provisions) Act 1981 =

Act of the Parliament of the United Kingdom

Atomic Energy (Miscellaneous Provisions) Act 1981 (Note: Section 4(2).)
- Act of Parliament
- Parliament of the United Kingdom
- Long title: An Act to extend the power of the United Kingdom Atomic Energy Authority to dispose of shares held by them in any company and the power of the Secretary of State to dispose of shares held by him in companies engaged in activities in the field of atomic energy or radioactive substances; to extend the power of the Secretary of State with respect to the application of sums received by the Authority; and for connected purposes.
- Citation: 1981 c. 48
- Introduced by: Under Secretary of State for Energy (Norman Lamont) Second Reading 10 February 1981 (Commons)
- Territorial extent: England and Wales; Scotland; Northern Ireland (except section 1(6) to (8)); (Note: Section 4(3).)

Dates
- Royal assent: 27 July 1981
- Commencement: 27 July 1981 (Note: Section 4(b) of the Interpretation Act 1978.)
Other legislation
Amends	Atomic Energy Authority Act 1954; Atomic Energy Authority Act 1971
Amended by	Radioactive Substances Act 1993; Energy Act 2004

Status: Amended

Text of statute as originally enacted

Revised text of statute as amended

Text of the Atomic Energy (Miscellaneous Provisions) Act 1981 as in force today (including any amendments) within the United Kingdom, from legislation.gov.uk.

The Atomic Energy (Miscellaneous Provisions) Act 1981 (c. 48) is an act of the Parliament of the United Kingdom. The effect of the act was to allow the United Kingdom Atomic Energy Authority, and the secretary of state for energy, to sell, or otherwise dispose of, shares in relevant companies held by them.

== Rationale ==
The principal aim of the act was to enable the United Kingdom Atomic Energy Authority (UKAEA) and the secretary of state for energy to dispose of shares in companies working with radioactive substances. Under the provisions of the Atomic Energy Authority Act 1971 the UKAEA's interest in radioactive substances used for medicine was transferred to The Radiochemical Centre (TRC). It was envisaged that TRC would eventually have a private shareholding free from government intervention. Although the UKAEA and secretary of state had powers to buy shares in relevant companies there was no power to dispose of shares. The 1971 act provided for a majority of shares in TRC to be in the public sector, however, the government now thought it expedient that the private holding may have a majority interest. The 1981 act provided for these requirements.

== Provisions ==
Long title: "An Act to extend the power of the United Kingdom Atomic Energy Authority to dispose of shares held by them in any company and the power of the Secretary of State to dispose of shares held by him in companies engaged in activities in the field of atomic energy or radioactive substances; to extend the power of the Secretary of State with respect to the application of sums received by the Authority; and for connected purposes."

The act received royal assent on 27 July 1981.

The act comprised four sections:

1. Extension of power of Atomic Energy Authority and Secretary of State to dispose of shares etc.
2. Application of Authority's receipts.
3. Expenses.
4. Interpretation, short title, and extent.

Section 1 of the act applies to the power of the UKAEA to dispose of shares it holds in any company, and the power of the Secretary of State to dispose of shares he holds in any company whose activities include the development of atomic energy, research connected with it, or the production, treatment, storage or disposal of radioactive substances. Both powers may be exercised whether or not the disposal is consistent with the functions of the Authority or, for the Secretary of State, with promoting or controlling the development of atomic energy, and whether the disposal extends to some or all of the shares held. Where the Authority is of the opinion that a disposal would not be consistent with its functions, it may only make the disposal if the Secretary of State is of the opinion that it will promote the national interest, and then only under directions given by him under section 3 of the Atomic Energy Authority Act 1954 (2 & 3 Eliz. 2. c. 32). A disposal by the Secretary of State that he considers inconsistent with promoting or controlling the development of atomic energy may only be made if he is of the opinion that it will promote the national interest.

Section 1(6) of the act disapplied section 11(3) of the Atomic Energy Authority Act 1971 (which required the Authority and the Secretary of State to continue to hold shares carrying more than half the voting rights in the Nuclear Fuels Company, British Nuclear Fuels, and the Radiochemical Company) in the case of the Radiochemical Company, which the act defines as Amersham International Limited, formerly The Radiochemical Centre Limited. Section 1(7) of the act provides that if the Authority and the Secretary of State cease to hold shares in the Radiochemical Company carrying more than half the voting rights, section 14 of the 1971 act (laying of accounts before Parliament) no longer applies to the company. Section 1(8) of the act amended section 11(5) of the 1971 act so that sums received by the Secretary of State on the disposal of shares, as well as in right of shares, are paid into the Consolidated Fund.

Section 2 of the act amended section 4(2) of the Atomic Energy Authority Act 1954, with retrospective effect, so that the sums to be applied as the Secretary of State directs with the approval of the Treasury are any sums received by the Authority, and not only its revenues. Section 3 of the act provides for any increase in the administrative expenses of the Secretary of State, and in sums payable under other acts, that is attributable to the act to be paid out of money provided by Parliament. Section 4(3) of the act extends the act, except section 1(6) to (8), to Northern Ireland.

== Subsequent developments ==
Section 1(6) of the act was repealed by section 198(2) of, and part 1 of schedule 23 to, the Energy Act 2004, which came into force on 5 October 2004.

== See also ==
- Atomic Energy Authority Act
- Atomic Energy Research Establishment
- Atomic Weapons Research Establishment
- Nuclear weapons and the United Kingdom
