= List of acts of the Parliament of the United Kingdom from 1959 =

This is a complete list of acts of the Parliament of the United Kingdom for the year 1959.

Note that the first parliament of the United Kingdom was held in 1801; parliaments between 1707 and 1800 were either parliaments of Great Britain or of Ireland. For acts passed up until 1707, see the list of acts of the Parliament of England and the list of acts of the Parliament of Scotland. For acts passed from 1707 to 1800, see the list of acts of the Parliament of Great Britain. See also the list of acts of the Parliament of Ireland.

For acts of the devolved parliaments and assemblies in the United Kingdom, see the list of acts of the Scottish Parliament, the list of acts of the Northern Ireland Assembly, and the list of acts and measures of Senedd Cymru; see also the list of acts of the Parliament of Northern Ireland.

The number shown after each act's title is its chapter number. Acts passed before 1963 are cited using this number, preceded by the year(s) of the reign during which the relevant parliamentary session was held; thus the Union with Ireland Act 1800 is cited as "39 & 40 Geo. 3 c. 67", meaning the 67th act passed during the session that started in the 39th year of the reign of George III and which finished in the 40th year of that reign. Note that the modern convention is to use Arabic numerals in citations (thus "41 Geo. 3" rather than "41 Geo. III"). Acts of the last session of the Parliament of Great Britain and the first session of the Parliament of the United Kingdom are both cited as "41 Geo. 3". Acts passed from 1963 onwards are simply cited by calendar year and chapter number.

== 7 & 8 Eliz. 2 ==
Continuing the fourth session of the 41st Parliament of the United Kingdom, which met from 28 October 1958 until 18 September 1959.

=== Public general acts ===
Short title	Citation	Royal assent
Long title
Navy, Army and Air Force Reserves Act 1959 (repealed)	7 & 8 Eliz. 2. c. 10	19 February 1959
An Act to extend until the end of June, nineteen hundred and sixty-four the liability for service in the reserve of the persons specified in paragraph (a) of subsection (1) of section one of the Navy, Army and Air Force Reserves Act, 1954; (Note: Navy, Army and Air Force Reserves Act 1954 (2 & 3 Eliz. 2. c. 10)) and to amend the law accordingly. (Repealed by Navy, Army and Air Force Reserves Act 1964 (c. 11))
European Monetary Agreement Act 1959 (repealed)	7 & 8 Eliz. 2. c. 11	19 February 1959
An Act to make certain provisions of a financial nature in connection with the operation of the European Monetary Agreement, and for purposes connected therewith. (Repealed by International Monetary Fund Act 1979 (c. 29))
Agriculture (Small Farmers) Act 1959 (repealed)	7 & 8 Eliz. 2. c. 12	19 February 1959
An Act to provide for the making of grants for the purpose of increasing the efficiency of small farm businesses; and for purposes connected with the matters aforesaid. (Repealed by Statute Law (Repeals) Act 1986 (c. 12))
Marriage (Secretaries of Synagogues) Act 1959	7 & 8 Eliz. 2. c. 13	19 February 1959
An Act to amend the definition of “secretary of a synagogue” in section sixty-seven of the Marriage Act, 1949. (Note: Marriage Act 1949 (12, 13 & 14 Geo. 6. c. 76))
Malta (Letters Patent) Act 1959 (repealed)	7 & 8 Eliz. 2. c. 14	19 February 1959
An Act to remove the limitation of Her Majesty's power to revoke or amend the Malta (Constitution) Letters Patent, 1947. (Repealed by Malta Independence Act 1964 (c. 86))
Consolidated Fund Act 1959 (repealed)	7 & 8 Eliz. 2. c. 15	25 March 1959
An Act to apply certain sums out of the Consolidated Fund to the service of the years ending on the thirty-first day of March, one thousand nine hundred and fifty-eight, one thousand nine hundred and fifty-nine and one thousand nine hundred and sixty. (Repealed by Statute Law Revision Act 1964 (c. 79))
Transport (Borrowing Powers) Act 1959 (repealed)	7 & 8 Eliz. 2. c. 16	25 March 1959
An Act to increase the limits imposed by paragraph (b) of subsection (1) of section twenty-six of the Transport Act, 1953, (Note: Transport Act 1953 (1 & 2 Eliz. 2. c. 13)) and by subsection (4) of section one of the Transport (Railway Finances) Act, 1957, (Note: Transport (Railway Finances) Act 1957 (5 & 6 Eliz. 2. c. 9)) on the borrowing powers of the British Transport Commission. (Repealed by Transport Act 1962 (10 & 11 Eliz. 2. c. 46))
International Bank and Monetary Fund Act 1959 (repealed)	7 & 8 Eliz. 2. c. 17	25 March 1959
An Act to enable effect to be given to proposed increases in the quotas of the International Monetary Fund and in the capital stock of the International Bank for Reconstruction and Development. (Repealed by Overseas Development and Co-operation Act 1980 (c. 63))
Family Allowances and National Insurance Act 1959 (repealed)	7 & 8 Eliz. 2. c. 18	25 March 1959
An Act to amend the law with respect to the determination of questions requiring decision for the purposes of the Family Allowances Act, 1945, (Note: Family Allowances Act 1945 (8 & 9 Geo. 6. c. 41)) or the National Insurance Acts, 1946, and in connection therewith to modify the provision made by the said Act of 1945 as to the commencement and termination of allowances thereunder; and for other purposes connected with the matters aforesaid. (Repealed by Statute Law Revision (Consequential Repeals) Act 1965 (c. 55))
Emergency Laws (Repeal) Act 1959	7 & 8 Eliz. 2. c. 19	25 March 1959
An Act to repeal certain emergency laws and, in particular, the enactments providing for the continuation of Defence Regulations; to continue in force for a limited period and with modifications certain Defence Regulations and other emergency provisions; to give permanent effect to an emergency provision; and for purposes connected with the matters aforesaid.
Electricity (Borrowing Powers) Act 1959 (repealed)	7 & 8 Eliz. 2. c. 20	25 March 1959
An Act to increase the statutory limits imposed on the amounts outstanding in respect of borrowings by the Electricity Council and Electricity Boards. (Repealed by Electricity and Gas Act 1963 (c. 59))
Intestate Husband's Estate (Scotland) Act 1959 (repealed)	7 & 8 Eliz. 2. c. 21	25 March 1959
An Act to increase the sum to which a surviving husband or wife is entitled by virtue of the Intestate Husband's Estate (Scotland) Acts, 1911 and 1919, and section five of the Law Reform (Miscellaneous Provisions) (Scotland) Act, 1940. (Note: Law Reform (Miscellaneous Provisions) (Scotland) Act 1940 (3 & 4 Geo. 6. c. 42)) (Repealed by Succession (Scotland) Act 1964 (c. 41))
County Courts Act 1959 (repealed)	7 & 8 Eliz. 2. c. 22	25 March 1959
An Act to consolidate, with corrections and improvements made under the Consolidation of Enactments (Procedure) Act, 1949, (Note: Consolidation of Enactments (Procedure) Act 1949 (12, 13 & 14 Geo. 6. c. 33)) certain enactments relating to county courts. (Repealed by County Courts Act 1984 (c. 28))
Overseas Resources Development Act 1959 (repealed)	7 & 8 Eliz. 2. c. 23	25 March 1959
An Act to consolidate the Overseas Resources Development Acts, 1948 to 1958, other than the provisions thereof relating to the Overseas Food Corporation. (Repealed by Commonwealth Development Corporation Act 1978 (c. 2))
Building (Scotland) Act 1959 (repealed)	7 & 8 Eliz. 2. c. 24	30 April 1959
An Act to make as respects Scotland new provision for safety, health and other matters in respect of the construction of buildings and for safety in respect of the conduct of building operations; for these purposes to establish buildings authorities for burghs and landward areas of counties and to amend the law relating to dean of guild courts; to amend the powers of local authorities in relation to buildings which are below prescribed standards or dangerous; and for purposes connected with the matters aforesaid. (Repealed by Building (Scotland) Act 2003 (asp 8))
Highways Act 1959 (repealed)	7 & 8 Eliz. 2. c. 25	30 April 1959
An Act to consolidate with amendments certain enactments relating to highways, streets and bridges in England and Wales, including certain enactments commonly contained in local Acts, and to make consequential amendments of the common law. (Repealed by Highways Act 1980 (c. 66))
Terms and Conditions of Employment Act 1959 (repealed)	7 & 8 Eliz. 2. c. 26	30 April 1959
An Act to repeal the Catering Wages Act, 1943, (Note: Catering Wages Act 1943 (6 & 7 Geo. 6. c. 24)) and to convert wages boards under that Act into wages councils; to make further provision with respect to wages councils and statutory minimum remuneration and with respect to the observance of recognised terms or conditions of employment; and for purposes connected with the matters aforesaid. (Repealed by Wages Councils Act 1959 (7 & 8 Eliz. 2. c. 69) and Employment Protection Act 1975 (c. 71))
Sea Fisheries (Compensation) (Scotland) Act 1959 (repealed)	7 & 8 Eliz. 2. c. 27	30 April 1959
An Act to make further provision as to compensation for any loss or damage occasioned to fishing nets or gear detained by sea fishery officers in Scotland. (Repealed by Inshore Fishing (Scotland) Act 1984 (c. 26))
Income Tax (Repayment of Post-War Credits) Act 1959	7 & 8 Eliz. 2. c. 28	30 April 1959
An Act to make further provision for the repayment of post-war credits (including credits to building societies), and to provide for the payment of interest thereon.
Colonial Development and Welfare (Amendment) Act 1959 (repealed)	7 & 8 Eliz. 2. c. 29	30 April 1959
An Act to make further provision with respect to the development and welfare of colonies and other territories. (Repealed by Colonial Development and Welfare Act 1959 (7 & 8 Eliz. 2. c. 71))
National Assistance (Amendment) Act 1959	7 & 8 Eliz. 2. c. 30	30 April 1959
An Act to amend sections twenty-four and twenty-nine of the National Assistance Act, 1948. (Note: National Assistance Act 1948 (11 & 12 Geo. 6. c. 29))
Agricultural Improvement Grants Act 1959 (repealed)	7 & 8 Eliz. 2. c. 31	30 April 1959
An Act to empower the Minister of Agriculture, Fisheries and Food and the Secretary of State to make provision by regulations as to the payment of improvement grants under the Hill Farming and Livestock Rearing Acts, 1946 to 1956, and as to the payment of grants and contributions under certain other enactments; and for purposes connected therewith. (Repealed by Agriculture Act 1970 (c. 40))
Eisteddfod Act 1959 (repealed)	7 & 8 Eliz. 2. c. 32	30 April 1959
An Act to make further provision for contributions by local authorities in Wales (including Monmouthshire) towards the expenses of the Royal National Eisteddfod. (Repealed by Statute Law (Repeals) Act 2004 (c. 14))
House Purchase and Housing Act 1959 (repealed)	7 & 8 Eliz. 2. c. 33	14 May 1959
An Act to authorise Exchequer advances to, and the deposit of trust funds with, designated building societies; to enlarge the power of local authorities to make advances under the Small Dwellings Acquisition Acts, 1899 to 1923, the Small Dwellings Acquisition (Scotland) Acts, 1899 to 1923, section forty-three of the Housing (Financial Provisions) Act, 1958, (Note: Housing (Financial Provisions) Act 1958 (6 & 7 Eliz. 2. c. 42)) and section seventy-five of the Housing (Scotland) Act, 1950; (Note: Housing (Scotland) Act 1950 (14 Geo. 6. c. 34)) to make further provision for grants by local authorities and Exchequer contributions to local authorities towards the improvement of dwellings; to amend the provisions of the said Act of 1958 and the said Act of 1950, with respect to Exchequer contributions and grants by local authorities towards the provision of dwellings by the conversion of houses and other buildings and towards the improvement of dwellings, and with respect to the conditions to be observed where assistance has been given under Part II of the said Act of 1958 or Part VII of the said Act of 1950; and for purposes connected with the matters aforesaid. (Repealed for England and Wales by Housing (Consequential Provisions) Act 1985 (c. 71) and for Scotland by Housing (Scotland) Act 1987 (c. 26))
Housing (Underground Rooms) Act 1959 (repealed)	7 & 8 Eliz. 2. c. 34	14 May 1959
An Act to make provision as to the circumstances in which underground rooms are to be deemed for the purposes of section eighteen of the Housing Act, 1957, (Note: Housing Act 1957 (5 & 6 Eliz. 2. c. 56)) to be unfit for human habitation. (Repealed by Housing (Consequential Provisions) Act 1985 (c. 71))
Small Lotteries and Gaming Act 1956 (Amendment) Act 1959 (repealed)	7 & 8 Eliz. 2. c. 35	14 May 1959
An Act to amend the law with respect to the holding of small lotteries on licensed premises. (Repealed by Betting and Gaming Act 1960 (c. 60))
Rating and Valuation Act 1959 (repealed)	7 & 8 Eliz. 2. c. 36	14 May 1959
An Act to postpone the coming into force of new valuation lists under Part III of the Local Government Act, 1948, (Note: Local Government Act 1948 (11 & 12 Geo. 6. c. 26)) and to restrict proposals for altering the current lists; to postpone the date as from which relief under section eight of the Rating and Valuation (Miscellaneous Provisions) Act, 1955, (Note: Rating and Valuation (Miscellaneous Provisions) Act 1955 (4 & 5 Eliz. 2. c. 9)) can be terminated or reduced; and for purposes connected with the matters aforesaid. (Repealed by General Rate Act 1967 (c. 9))
Restriction of Offensive Weapons Act 1959	7 & 8 Eliz. 2. c. 37	14 May 1959
An Act to amend the law in relation to the making and disposing and importation of flick knives and other dangerous weapons.
Police Federation Act 1959 (repealed)	7 & 8 Eliz. 2. c. 38	14 May 1959
An Act to amend the provisions of the Schedule to the Police Act, 1919, (Note: Police Act 1919 (9 & 10 Geo. 5. c. 46)) with respect to the dates of elections of Branch Boards and of annual meetings of Branch Boards and Central Conferences of the Police Federation. (Repealed by Police Act 1964 (c. 48))
Supreme Court of Judicature (Amendment) Act 1959 (repealed)	7 & 8 Eliz. 2. c. 39	14 May 1959
An Act to amend the law relating to the restriction of vexatious actions. (Repealed by Senior Courts Act 1981 (c. 54))
Deer (Scotland) Act 1959 (repealed)	7 & 8 Eliz. 2. c. 40	14 May 1959
An Act to consolidate the legislation relating to deer in Scotland. (Repealed by Deer (Scotland) Act 1996 (c. 58))
Criminal Justice Administration (Amendment) Act 1959 (repealed)	7 & 8 Eliz. 2. c. 41	9 July 1959
An Act to amend the law relating to the formation of additional courts of quarter sessions in boroughs. (Repealed by Criminal Justice Administration Act 1962 (10 & 11 Eliz. 2. c. 15))
Solicitors (Amendment) Act 1959 (repealed)	7 & 8 Eliz. 2. c. 42	9 July 1959
An Act to make provision for an increase in the membership of the disciplinary committee constituted under section forty-six of the Solicitors Act, 1957. (Note: Solicitors Act 1957 (5 & 6 Eliz. 2. c. 27)) (Repealed by Solicitors (Amendment) Act 1974 (c. 26))
Post Office Works Act 1959	7 & 8 Eliz. 2. c. 43	9 July 1959
An Act to vest in the Postmaster General certain underground works constructed in London, Manchester and Birmingham in the exercise of emergency powers; and for purposes connected therewith.
Fire Services Act 1959	7 & 8 Eliz. 2. c. 44	9 July 1959
An Act to amend the Fire Services Act, 1947, (Note: Fire Services Act 1947 (10 & 11 Geo. 6. c. 41)) and make further provision as to the pensions of persons transferring to or from the fire service and as to members of fire brigades becoming temporary instructors in training establishments. (Repealed for England and Wales by Fire and Rescue Services Act 2004 (c. 21) and for Scotland by Fire (Scotland) Act 2005 (asp 5))
Metropolitan Magistrates' Courts Act 1959	7 & 8 Eliz. 2. c. 45	9 July 1959
An Act to increase the maximum number of the metropolitan stipendiary magistrates; to authorise the appointment of acting stipendiary magistrates for the metropolitan stipendiary court area; to enable the Receiver to provide premises required for the probation system within the said area; and to make further provision with respect to the power of the Receiver to borrow money.
Nuclear Installations (Licensing and Insurance) Act 1959 (repealed)	7 & 8 Eliz. 2. c. 46	9 July 1959
An Act to make provision for the regulation of certain installations capable of emitting ionising radiations and with respect to the incidence of, and the provision of cover for, liability in respect of any such radiations emitted from, or in connection with the use of, any such installation; and for purposes connected with the matters aforesaid. (Repealed by Nuclear Installations Act 1965 (c. 57))
National Insurance Act 1959 (repealed)	7 & 8 Eliz. 2. c. 47	9 July 1959
An Act to alter the contributions payable to the National Insurance Fund under the National Insurance Acts, 1946 to 1957, and the retirement benefits payable under those Acts, and in particular to provide for payment of a graduated retirement benefit in return for contributions related to the amount of a person's remuneration, and for purposes connected therewith. (Repealed by Statute Law Revision (Consequential Repeals) Act 1965 (c. 55))
Cotton Industry Act 1959 (repealed)	7 & 8 Eliz. 2. c. 48	9 July 1959
An Act to enable schemes made with a view to eliminating excess capacity in the cotton industry to provide for paying compensation for any such elimination and for raising the sums required for that and other purposes by levies on the industry; to enable the Board of Trade to make contributions towards any such compensation and to make grants for the re-equipment of the industry; and for purposes connected therewith. (Repealed by Statute Law (Repeals) Act 1977 (c. 18))
Chevening Estate Act 1959	7 & 8 Eliz. 2. c. 49	9 July 1959
An Act to confirm and give effect to a vesting deed and trust instrument relating to the Chevening Estate and other property, and for purposes connected therewith.
Pensions (Increase) Act 1959 (repealed)	7 & 8 Eliz. 2. c. 50	9 July 1959
An Act to provide for increases of certain pensions. (Repealed by Pensions (Increase) Act 1971 (c. 56))
Licensing (Scotland) Act 1959 (repealed)	7 & 8 Eliz. 2. c. 51	9 July 1959
An Act to consolidate certain enactments which relate to licensing in Scotland and to matters connected therewith, with corrections and improvements made under the Consolidation of Enactments (Procedure) Act, 1949. (Repealed by Licensing (Scotland) Act 1976 (c. 66))
National Assistance Act 1959 (repealed)	7 & 8 Eliz. 2. c. 52	9 July 1959
An Act to empower the Minister of Pensions and National Insurance to make orders increasing any of the amounts specified in paragraph 3 or 5 of the Second Schedule to the National Assistance Act, 1948, and making certain consequential provision. (Repealed by Ministry of Social Security Act 1966 (c. 20))
Town and Country Planning Act 1959	7 & 8 Eliz. 2. c. 53	16 July 1959
An Act to make further provision as to compensation in respect of the compulsory acquisition of land, and as to other matters relating to the acquisition, appropriation and disposal of land by public authorities; to make provision as to proceedings in respect of certain matters arising under the Town and Country Planning Acts, 1947 to 1954, and the Town and Country Planning (Scotland) Acts, 1947 to 1954, as to applications for planning permission under those Acts, and as to enforcement notices thereunder; to make further provision as to procedure in connection with statutory inquiries, as to compensation for damage to requisitioned land, and as to advances to highway authorities in respect of land acquired for highways; and for purposes connected with the matters aforesaid.
Weeds Act 1959	7 & 8 Eliz. 2. c. 54	16 July 1959
An Act to consolidate certain enactments relating to injurious weeds.
Dog Licences Act 1959 (repealed)	7 & 8 Eliz. 2. c. 55	16 July 1959
An Act to consolidate certain enactments and Orders in Council relating to the licensing of dogs kept in Great Britain. (Repealed by Local Government Act 1988 (c. 9))
Rights of Light Act 1959	7 & 8 Eliz. 2. c. 56	16 July 1959
An Act to amend the law relating to rights of light, and for purposes connected therewith.
Street Offences Act 1959	7 & 8 Eliz. 2. c. 57	16 July 1959
An Act to make, as respects England and Wales, further provision against loitering or soliciting in public places for the purpose of prostitution, and for the punishment of those guilty of certain offences in connection with refreshment houses and those who live on the earnings of or control prostitutes.
Finance Act 1959	7 & 8 Eliz. 2. c. 58	29 July 1959
An Act to grant certain duties, to alter other duties, and to amend the law relating to the National Debt and the Public Revenue, and to make further provision in connection with Finance.
Appropriation Act 1959 (repealed)	7 & 8 Eliz. 2. c. 59	29 July 1959
An Act to apply a sum out of the Consolidated Fund to the service of the year ending on the thirty-first day of March, one thousand nine hundred and sixty, and to appropriate the supplies granted in this Session of Parliament. (Repealed by Statute Law Revision Act 1964 (c. 79))
Education Act 1959 (repealed)	7 & 8 Eliz. 2. c. 60	29 July 1959
An Act to enlarge the powers of the Minister of Education to make contributions, grants and loans in respect of aided schools and special agreement schools, and for purposes connected therewith. (Repealed by Education Act 1996 (c. 56))
National Galleries of Scotland Act 1959	7 & 8 Eliz. 2. c. 61	29 July 1959
An Act to authorise the payment under section seven of the National Galleries of Scotland Act, 1906, (Note: National Galleries of Scotland Act 1906 (6 Edw. 7. c. 50)) out of moneys provided by Parliament of expenditure incurred by the Board of Trustees for the National Galleries of Scotland in the performance of such functions, in addition to the management of the National Gallery and the National Portrait Gallery, as are conferred on them by or under that Act.
New Towns Act 1959 (repealed)	7 & 8 Eliz. 2. c. 62	29 July 1959
An Act to make, as respects England and Wales, new provision in place of section fifteen of the New Towns Act, 1946, (Note: New Towns Act 1946 (9 & 10 Geo. 6. c. 68)) as to the disposal of the undertakings of development corporations and other matters arising when a development corporation has achieved or substantially achieved the purposes for which it is established; to amend the law relating to development corporations by increasing the limit on the advances which may be made to them under sub section (1) of section twelve of that Act, by providing for housing subsidies to be wholly or partly withheld in respect of dwellings disposed of by them, and by authorising them to make contributions towards the provision of amenities; and for purposes connected with the matters aforesaid. (Repealed for Scotland by New Towns (Scotland) Act 1968 (c. 16) and for England and Wales by House of Commons Disqualification Act 1975 (c. 24) and New Towns Act 1981 (c. 64))
Export Guarantees Act 1959 (repealed)	7 & 8 Eliz. 2. c. 63	29 July 1959
An Act to increase the amount of the liabilities which may be undertaken by the Board of Trade in respect of guarantees under sections one and two of the Export Guarantees Act, 1949. (Note: Export Guarantees Act 1949 (12, 13 & 14 Geo. 6. c. 14)) (Repealed by Export Guarantees Act 1964 (c. 6))
Landlord and Tenant (Furniture and Fittings) Act 1959 (repealed)	7 & 8 Eliz. 2. c. 64	29 July 1959
An Act further to regulate the requiring of payments for furniture, fittings or other articles as a condition of the grant, renewal, continuance or assignment of tenancies of dwellings. (Repealed for England and Wales by Rent Act 1968 (c. 23) and for Scotland by Rent (Scotland) Act 1971 (c. 28))
Fatal Accidents Act 1959 (repealed)	7 & 8 Eliz. 2. c. 65	29 July 1959
An Act to amend the Fatal Accidents Act, 1846, (Note: Fatal Accidents Act 1846 (9 & 10 Vict. c. 93)) and the Carriage by Air Act, 1932, (Note: Carriage by Air Act 1932 (22 & 23 Geo. 5. c. 36)) by enlarging the class of persons for whose benefit an action may be brought thereunder, and to provide for certain benefits to be left out of account in assessing damages in such an action. (Repealed by Statute Law (Repeals) Act 1989 (c. 43))
Obscene Publications Act 1959	7 & 8 Eliz. 2. c. 66	29 July 1959
An Act to amend the law relating to the publication of obscene matter; to provide for the protection of literature; and to strengthen the law concerning pornography.
Factories Act 1959 (repealed)	7 & 8 Eliz. 2. c. 67	29 July 1959
An Act to amend the Factories Acts, 1937 (Note: Factories Act 1937 (1 Edw. 8. & 1 Geo. 6. c. 67)) and 1948, (Note: Factories Act 1948 (11 & 12 Geo. 6. c. 55)) and make further provision as to the health, safety and welfare of persons employed in factories or in premises or operations to which those Acts apply; to revoke Regulation 59 of the Defence (General) Regulations, 1939, and for connected purposes. (Repealed by Factories Act 1961 (c. 34))
Statute Law Revision Act 1959 (repealed)	7 & 8 Eliz. 2. c. 68	29 July 1959
An Act to revise the statute law by repealing obsolete, spent, unnecessary or superseded enactments. (Repealed by Statute Law (Repeals) Act 1974 (c. 22))
Wages Councils Act 1959 (repealed)	7 & 8 Eliz. 2. c. 69	29 July 1959
An Act to consolidate the enactments relating to Wages Councils. (Repealed by Wages Councils Act 1979 (c. 12))
Town and Country Planning (Scotland) Act 1959	7 & 8 Eliz. 2. c. 70	29 July 1959
An Act to re-enact in the form in which they apply to Scotland the provisions of the Town and Country Planning Act, 1959. (Note: Town and Country Planning Act 1959 (7 & 8 Eliz. 2. c. 53))
Colonial Development and Welfare Act 1959 (repealed)	7 & 8 Eliz. 2. c. 71	29 July 1959
An Act to consolidate the Colonial Development and Welfare Acts, 1940 to 1959. (Repealed by Statute Law (Repeals) Act 1976 (c. 16))
Mental Health Act 1959	7 & 8 Eliz. 2. c. 72	29 July 1959
An Act to repeal the Lunacy and Mental Treatment Acts 1890 to 1930, and the Mental Deficiency Acts 1913 to 1938, and to make fresh provision with respect to the treatment and care of mentally disordered persons and with respect to their property and affairs; and for purposes connected with the matters aforesaid.
Legitimacy Act 1959 (repealed)	7 & 8 Eliz. 2. c. 73	29 July 1959
An Act to amend the Legitimacy Act, 1926, (Note: Legitimacy Act 1926 (16 & 17 Geo. 5. c. 60)) to legitimate the children of certain void marriages, and otherwise to amend the law relating to children born out of wedlock. (Repealed by Family Law Reform Act 1987 (c. 42))

=== Local acts ===
Short title	Citation	Royal assent
Long title
Angle Ore and Transport Company Act 1959	7 & 8 Eliz. 2. c. viii	25 March 1959
An Act to empower the Angle Ore and Transport Company Limited to construct works and to acquire lands and for other purposes.
Railway Clearing System Superannuation Fund Act 1959	7 & 8 Eliz. 2. c. ix	30 April 1959
An Act to empower the Railway Clearing System Superannuation Fund Corporation to allow Coras Iompair Eireann (Note: Córas Iompair Éireann (CIÉ) is the state transport provide for the Republic of Ireland, and operator of a cross-border railway service into Northern Ireland.) to subscribe to the fund of that Corporation in respect of certain contributing members to the fund passing into their service and for other purposes.
Tees Conservancy Act 1959	7 & 8 Eliz. 2. c. x	30 April 1959
An Act to extend the time for the completion by the Tees Conservancy Commissioners of certain works and for other purposes.
Glamorgan County Council Act 1959 (repealed)	7 & 8 Eliz. 2. c. xi	30 April 1959
An Act to confer further powers on the Glamorgan County Council in relation to the superannuation fund maintained by the Council and for other purposes. (Repealed by West Glamorgan Act 1987 (c. viii))
Gloucestershire County Council Act 1959	7 & 8 Eliz. 2. c. xii	30 April 1959
An Act to confer further powers on the Gloucestershire County Council in relation to their superannuation fund and for other purposes.
All Saints Chelsea Act 1959	7 & 8 Eliz. 2. c. xiii	30 April 1959
An Act to vest part of the churchyard appurtenant to the church of All Saints Chelsea in the London Diocesan Fund as custodian trustee of the Parochial Church Council of All Saints Chelsea to authorise the erection of a building thereon and for other purposes.
Hospital of St. Mary Magdalene and other Charities (Newcastle-upon-Tyne) Charity Scheme Confirmation Act 1959	7 & 8 Eliz. 2. c. xiv	14 May 1959
An Act to confirm a Scheme of the Charity Commissioners for the application or management of the Charity called the Hospital of St. Mary Magdalene and other Charities in the City and County of Newcastle upon Tyne.
	Scheme for the Application or Management of the following Charities in the City and County of Newcastle upon Tyne:—: 1. The Charity called The Hospital of St. Mary Magdalene, comprised in the Saint Mary Magdalene Hospital Act, 1867, 30 and 31 Vict. c. vii (Local) (Note: St. Mary Magdalene Hospital, Newcastle-upon-Tyne Act 1867 (30 & 31 Vict. c. vii)) as amended by the Saint Mary Magdalene Hospital (Newcastle-upon-Tyne) Act, 1940, (Note: Saint Mary Magdalene Hospital (Newcastle-upon-Tyne) Act 1940 (3 & 4 Geo. 6. c. xxxv)) and a Scheme of the Charity Commissioners of the 3rd June 1955; 2. The Charity called The Hospital of the Holy Jesus, regulated by the Holy Jesus Hospital Act, 1847, (Note: Holy Jesus Hospital, Newcastle-upon-Tyne Act 1847 (10 & 11 Vict. c. 34 Pr.)) and comprised in a Scheme of the said Commissioners of the 12th July 1935; 3. The Charity known as the Hospital of Thomas Davison; 4. The Charity known as the Hospital of Ann Davison; 5. The Charity known as the Hospital of Sir Walter Blackett.	
Hospital of St. Nicholas (Salisbury) Charity Scheme Confirmation Act 1959	7 & 8 Eliz. 2. c. xv	14 May 1959
An Act to confirm a Scheme of the Charity Commissioners for the application or management of the Charity known as the Hospital of St. Nicolas, in the City of Salisbury.
	Scheme for the Application or Management of the following Charity:— The Charity known as the Hospital of St. Nicholas, in the City of Salisbury, refounded by Letters Patent of 3rd April 8 James I.	
Jesus Hospital (Rothwell) Charity Scheme Confirmation Act 1959	7 & 8 Eliz. 2. c. xvi	14 May 1959
An Act to confirm a Scheme of the Charity Commissioners for the application or management of the Charity known as Jesus Hospital, at Rothwell, in the County of Northampton.
	Scheme for the Application or Management of the following Charity:— The Charity known as Jesus Hospital, at Rothwell, in the County of Northampton, regulated by a Charter dated the 29th June 38 Elizabeth I and comprised in a Scheme of the Charity Commissioners of the 23rd May 1865.	
Poor's Coal Charity (Wavendon) Charity Scheme Confirmation Act 1959	7 & 8 Eliz. 2. c. xvii	14 May 1959
An Act to confirm a Scheme of the Charity Commissioners for the application or management of the Charity known as the Poor's Coal Charity, in the Ancient Parish of Wavendon, in the Counties of Buckingham and Bedford.
	Scheme for the Application or Management of the following Charity:— The Charity known as the Poor's Coal Charity, in the Ancient Parish of Wavendon, in the Counties of Buckingham and Bedford, comprised in an agreement dated the 24th April 1809 and the Act, 50 Geo. 3 cap. cxcv (Local and Personal). (Note: Duke of Bedford's Estate (Poor's Coal Charity (Wavendon) Act 1810 (50 Geo. 3. c. cxcv))	
Ministry of Housing and Local Government Provisional Order Confirmation (West Hertfordshire Main Drainage) Act 1959	7 & 8 Eliz. 2. c. xviii	14 May 1959
An Act to confirm a Provisional Order of the Minister of Housing and Local Government relating to Colne Valley Sewerage Board.
	West Hertfordshire Main Drainage Order 1959 Provisional Order altering a Local Act. (Note: Hertfordshire County Council (Colne Valley Sewerage, &c.) Act 1937 (1 Edw. 8 & 1 Geo. 6. c. lxxxix))	
Calvinistic Methodist or Presbyterian Church of Wales (Amendment) Act 1959	7 & 8 Eliz. 2. c. xix	14 May 1959
An Act to amend certain provisions of the Calvinistic Methodist or Presbyterian Church of Wales Act 1933 (Note: Calvinistic Methodist or Presbyterian Church of Wales Act 1933 (23 & 24 Geo. 5. c. xxxvii)) by enlarging the powers of investment conferred on the properties board thereby constituted and to confirm the validity of certain conveyances assignments and other assurances and for other purposes.
Glasgow Corporation Order Confirmation Act 1959	7 & 8 Eliz. 2. c. xx	9 July 1959
An Act to confirm a Provisional Order under the Private Legislation Procedure (Scotland) Act 1936 (Note: Private Legislation Procedure (Scotland) Act 1936 (26 Geo. 5 & 1 Edw. 8. c. 52)) relating to Glasgow Corporation.
	Glasgow Corporation Order 1959 Provisional Order to extend the time for the compulsory purchase of lands for the construction of the sewer authorised by the Glasgow Corporation Order 1953 to empower the Corporation of the city of Glasgow to discontinue supplies of water under pressure for the purpose of hydraulic power to confer powers on the said Corporation as to the fixing of rates tolls charges and rents in respect of certain of their markets and for other purposes.	
Royal Wanstead School Act 1959	7 & 8 Eliz. 2. c. xxi	9 July 1959
An Act to confer further powers on the Royal Wanstead School and for other purposes.
Birmingham Corporation Act 1959 (repealed)	7 & 8 Eliz. 2. c. xxii	9 July 1959
An Act to authorise the lord mayor aldermen and citizens of the city of Birmingham to provide and use an exhibition hall and for other purposes. (Repealed by National Exhibition Centre and Birmingham Municipal Bank Act 1976 (c. xix))
Round Oak Steel Works (Level Crossings) Act 1959	7 & 8 Eliz. 2. c. xxiii	9 July 1959
An Act to authorise Round Oak Steel Works Limited to divert a level crossing confirmed by the Round Oak Steel Works (Level Crossings) Act 1948 (Note: Round Oak Steel Works (Level Crossings) Act 1948 (11 & 12 Geo. 6. c. xiii)) to amend that Act and for other purposes.
Railway Passengers Assurance Act 1959	7 & 8 Eliz. 2. c. xxiv	9 July 1959
An Act to amend the Railway Passengers Assurance (Consolidation) Act 1918 (Note: Railway Passengers Assurance (Consolidation) Act 1918 (8 & 9 Geo. 5. c. xiv)) and for other purposes.
North Devon Water Act 1959	7 & 8 Eliz. 2. c. xxv	9 July 1959
An Act to authorise the North Devon Water Board to construct additional waterworks and to acquire lands to confer further powers upon the Board and for other purposes.
Thames Conservancy Act 1959	7 & 8 Eliz. 2. c. xxvi	9 July 1959
An Act to amend the Thames Conservancy Acts 1932 (Note: Thames Conservancy Act 1932 (22 & 23 Geo. 5. c. xxxvii)) and 1950 (Note: Thames Conservancy Act 1950 (14 Geo. 6. c. l)) to extend the powers and make further provision for the revenue of the Conservators of the river Thames and for other purposes.
Middlesex County Council Act 1959	7 & 8 Eliz. 2. c. xxvii	9 July 1959
An Act to enable parts of a metropolitan common in the county of Middlesex to be used for the making or improvement of highways and to enable parts of other metropolitan commons in the said county to be used for the improvement of highways and to enact provisions incidental thereto.
Port of London Act 1959 (repealed)	7 & 8 Eliz. 2. c. xxviii	9 July 1959
An Act to confer further powers on the Port of London Authority and for other purposes. (Repealed by Port of London Act 1968 (c. xxxii))
Bradford Corporation Act 1959 (repealed)	7 & 8 Eliz. 2. c. xxix	9 July 1959
An Act to make further provision with respect to the misuse of certificates and reports of the Bradford Conditioning House established under the Bradford Corporation (Various Powers) Act 1887 (Note: Bradford Corporation (Various Powers) Act 1887 (50 & 51 Vict. c. cxxxii)) and the admission in evidence of such certificates and reports to amend the said Act of 1887 and for other purposes. (Repealed by West Yorkshire Act 1980 (c. xiv))
Finsbury Square Act 1959 (repealed)	7 & 8 Eliz. 2. c. xxx	9 July 1959
An Act to amend the Finsbury Square Act 1957 (Note: Finsbury Square Act 1957 (5 & 6 Eliz. 2. c. xl)) to make further provision with reference to the use of Finsbury Square and for other purposes. (Repealed by Local Law (Greater London Council and Inner London Boroughs) Order 1965 (SI 1965/540))
London County Council (Money) Act 1959	7 & 8 Eliz. 2. c. xxxi	9 July 1959
An Act to regulate the expenditure on capital account and lending of money by the London County Council during the financial period from the first day of April nineteen hundred and fifty-nine to the thirtieth day of September nineteen hundred and sixty and for other purposes.
Bucks Water Board Act 1959	7 & 8 Eliz. 2. c. xxxii	16 July 1959
An Act to provide for the transfer to the Bucks Water Board of the water undertakings of the Marlow Water Company and the councils of the boroughs of Brackley and High Wycombe of the urban districts of Bletchley Newport Pagnell and Wolverton and of the rural districts of Brackley Newport Pagnell Towcester and Wycombe to alter the constitution of the Board to confer further powers upon and extend the limits of supply of the Board and for other purposes.
Reading and Berkshire Water, &c. Act 1959	7 & 8 Eliz. 2. c. xxxiii	16 July 1959
An Act to constitute a joint board to supply water in the county borough of Reading and in parts of the administrative counties of Berks Oxford and Hampshire; to vest in the said board the water undertakings of certain of the constituent councils part of the water undertaking of the council of the rural district of Faringdon and the undertakings of the Henley-on-Thames Water Company Limited the Hungerford Waterworks Company Limited and the South Oxfordshire Water Company and part of the undertaking of the Mid-Wessex Water Company to confer further powers on the mayor aldermen and burgesses of the county borough of Reading and on the county council of the administrative county of Berks and for other purposes.
Edinburgh College of Art Order Confirmation Act 1959	7 & 8 Eliz. 2. c. xxxiv	29 July 1959
An Act to confirm a Provisional Order under the Private Legislation Procedure (Scotland) Act 1936 relating to the Edinburgh College of Art.
	Edinburgh College of Art Order 1959 Provisional Order to incorporate a governing body for the Edinburgh College of Art and to transfer the said college and the endowments held in connection therewith by the Corporation of the city of Edinburgh as governors of the said college to the said governing body and to confer powers on them with respect thereto and for other purposes.	
Leith Harbour and Docks Order Confirmation Act 1959 (repealed)	7 & 8 Eliz. 2. c. xxxv	29 July 1959
An Act to confirm a Provisional Order under the Private Legislation Procedure (Scotland) Act 1936 relating to Leith Harbour and Docks. (Repealed by Statute Law (Repeals) Act 1986 (c. 12))
	Leith Harbour and Docks Order 1959 Provisional Order to authorise the Commissioners for the harbour and docks of Leith to construct a work to amend the provisions of the Leith Harbour and Docks Orders 1935 to 1952 relating to rates and charges to confer further powers on the Commissioners and for other purposes.	
British Transport Commission Order Confirmation Act 1959	7 & 8 Eliz. 2. c. xxxvi	29 July 1959
An Act to confirm a Provisional Order under the Private Legislation Procedure (Scotland) Act 1936 relating to the British Transport Commission.
	British Transport Commission Order 1959 Provisional Order to empower the British Transport Commission to construct works and to acquire lands to confer further powers on the Commission and for other purposes.	
Pier and Harbour Order (Gloucester) Confirmation Act 1959	7 & 8 Eliz. 2. c. xxxvii	29 July 1959
An Act to confirm a Provisional Order made by the Minister of Transport and Civil Aviation under the General Pier and Harbour Act, 1861, (Note: General Pier and Harbour Act 1861 (24 & 25 Vict. c. 45)) relating to Gloucester.
	Gloucester Harbour Order 1959 Provisional Order to confer further powers on the Gloucester Harbour Trustees and for other purposes.	
Pier and Harbour Order (Medway Lower Navigation) Confirmation Act 1959 (repealed)	7 & 8 Eliz. 2. c. xxxviii	29 July 1959
An Act to confirm a Provisional Order made by the Minister of Transport and Civil Aviation under the General Pier and Harbour Act 1861 relating to the Medway Lower Navigation. (Repealed by Medway Ports Reorganisation Scheme 1968 Confirmation Order 1969 (SI 1969/1045))
	Medway Lower Navigation Order 1959 Provisional Order to authorise the Medway Lower Navigation Company to increase the total sum standing to the credit of its contingency fund.	
Joseph Rowntree Memorial Trust Act 1959	7 & 8 Eliz. 2. c. xxxix	29 July 1959
An Act to extend the objects and powers of the Joseph Rowntree Village Trust, to change the name thereof and for other purposes.
Falmouth Docks Act 1959	7 & 8 Eliz. 2. c. xl	29 July 1959
An Act to consolidate with amendments the statutory powers of the Falmouth Docks and Engineering Company to confer further powers upon the Company and for other purposes.
Bootle Corporation Act 1959	7 & 8 Eliz. 2. c. xli	29 July 1959
An Act to confer further powers upon the mayor aldermen and burgesses of the borough of Bootle to make further provision for the improvement health local government and finances of the borough and for other purposes.
Tees Valley and Cleveland Water Act 1959	7 & 8 Eliz. 2. c. xlii	29 July 1959
An Act to authorise the Tees Valley and Cleveland Water Board to construct additional waterworks and to acquire lands to amend provisions relating to the discharge of compensation water by that Board and other provisions and for other purposes.
Mid-Wessex Water Act 1959	7 & 8 Eliz. 2. c. xliii	29 July 1959
An Act to authorise the transfer to the Mid-Wessex Water Company of the water undertaking of the mayor aldermen and burgesses of the borough of Basingstoke to extend the limits of supply of the Company and for other purposes.
British Transport Commission Act 1959	7 & 8 Eliz. 2. c. xliv	29 July 1959
An Act to empower the British Transport Commission to construct works and to acquire lands and the Liverpool Corporation to defray the cost of certain works to authorise the closing for navigation of ports of certain inland waterways to repeal and amend certain enactments relating to Holyhead Harbour to authorise the Commission to guarantee loans to certain pilotage authorities to make provision in respect of certain charges in connection with the undertaking of the Fishguard and Rosslare Railways and Harbours Company to extend the time for the compulsory purchase of certain lands to confer further powers on the Commission and for other purposes.
Portsmouth Corporation Act 1959	7 & 8 Eliz. 2. c. xlv	29 July 1959
An Act to authorise the lord mayor aldermen and citizens of the city of Portsmouth to construct quay works and street improvements to purchase lands compulsorily for those and other purposes to make provision with regard to lands streets and buildings and the local government health welfare improvement and finances of the city to confer further powers upon them and to make further provision with reference to their Camber Dock and Flathouse Wharf undertakings and Langstone Harbour and for other purposes.
Humber Bridge Act 1959	7 & 8 Eliz. 2. c. xlvi	29 July 1959
An Act to provide for the construction and maintenance of a bridge across the river Humber with approach roads and other works to constitute a Board and for other purposes.
Shell-Mex and B.P. (London Airport Pipeline) Act 1959	7 & 8 Eliz. 2. c. xlvii	29 July 1959
An Act to empower Shell-Mex and B.P. Limited to construct pipelines between Walton-on-Thames and London Airport and to acquire lands and for other purposes.
Halifax Corporation Act 1959 (repealed)	7 & 8 Eliz. 2. c. xlviii	29 July 1959
An Act to make further provision for the improvement health and local government of the county borough of Halifax and for other purposes. (Repealed by West Yorkshire Act 1980 (c. xiv))
City of London (Various Powers) Act 1959	7 & 8 Eliz. 2. c. xlix	29 July 1959
An Act to make further provision with respect to the presentation and swearing of the Lord Mayor of London to confer powers upon the Corporation of London with respect to the provision of storage facilities for horticultural produce and containers the acquisition of land and the use of the Metropolitan Cattle Market Islington therefor to amend the law relating to distress for rates in the said city to make provision with respect to deer sanctuaries nuisances superannuation and other matters and for other purposes.
South Wales Transport Act 1959	7 & 8 Eliz. 2. c. l	29 July 1959
An Act to provide for the closing of the Oystermouth railway and the Mumbles railway the dissolution of the Swansea and Mumbles Railways Limited and the Mumbles Railway and Pier Company to confer further powers upon the South Wales Transport Company Limited and for other purposes.
Lee Valley Water Act 1959	7 & 8 Eliz. 2. c. li	29 July 1959
An Act to incorporate the Lee Valley Water Company to transfer to that company the undertakings of the Barnet District Water Company the Herts and Essex Water Company and the Royston Water Company Limited and the water undertakings of the First Garden City Limited the trustees of a settlement by Lady Margaret Hermione Millicent Cobbold the mayor aldermen and burgesses of the borough of Hertford the Stevenage Development Corporation the Baldock Urban District Council the Hitchin Urban District Council the Ware Urban District Council the Welwyn Garden City Urban District Council the Braughing Rural District Council the Hertford Rural District Council the Hitchin Rural District Council the Ware Rural District Council and the Welwyn Rural District Council to confer powers upon the Company and for other purposes.
London County Council (General Powers) Act 1959	7 & 8 Eliz. 2. c. lii	29 July 1959
An Act to confer further powers upon the London County Council and other authorities and for other purposes.

=== Sources ===
- The Journals of the House of Commons (PDF). Vol. 214 (October 1958 – September 1959). pp. 3–327 – via parliament.uk.
- Chronological Table of the Statutes: Covering the Period from 1235 to the End of 1971. London: Her Majesty's Stationery Office. 1972. pp. 1151–1172. ISBN 978-0-11-840096-1 – via Google Books.
- "UK Public General Acts from 1959". legislation.gov.uk. The National Archives.
- "UK Local Acts from 1959". legislation.gov.uk. The National Archives.
- "Chronological Tables of Local Acts: Part 180 (1958-1960)". legislation.gov.uk. The National Archives.

== 8 & 9 Eliz. 2 ==
The first session of the 42nd Parliament of the United Kingdom, which met from 20 October 1959 until 27 October 1960.

=== Public general acts ===
Short title	Citation	Royal assent
Long title
Mr. Speaker Morrison's Retirement Act 1959 (repealed)	8 & 9 Eliz. 2. c. 1	17 December 1959
An Act to settle and secure annuities upon the Right Honourable William Shepherd Morrison, and after his death upon his wife, Catherine Allison Morrison, in consideration of his eminent services. (Repealed by Statute Law (Repeals) Act 1986 (c. 12))
Post Office and Telegraph (Money) Act 1959 (repealed)	8 & 9 Eliz. 2. c. 2	17 December 1959
An Act to provide further money for expenses of the Post Office properly chargeable to capital account; and for purposes connected therewith. (Repealed by Post Office Act 1961 (9 & 10 Eliz. 2. c. 15))
Marshall Scholarships Act 1959	8 & 9 Eliz. 2. c. 3	17 December 1959
An Act to increase the number of Marshall scholarships which may be provided in each year.
Expiring Laws Continuance Act 1959 (repealed)	8 & 9 Eliz. 2. c. 4	17 December 1959
An Act to continue certain expiring laws. (Repealed by Statute Law Revision Act 1963 (c. 30))
Atomic Energy Authority Act 1959	8 & 9 Eliz. 2. c. 5	17 December 1959
An Act to increase the maximum number of members of the United Kingdom Atomic Energy Authority, and to enable the Authority to include in their pension schemes staff of the National Institute for Research in Nuclear Science.
Commonwealth Scholarships Act 1959 (repealed)	8 & 9 Eliz. 2. c. 6	17 December 1959
An Act to make provisions for matters arising out of the Commonwealth Education Conference. (Repealed by Overseas Development and Co-operation Act 1980 (c. 63))
Sea Fish Industry Act 1959 (repealed)	8 & 9 Eliz. 2. c. 7	17 December 1959
An Act to increase the aggregate amounts of grants made in pursuance of schemes under sections one and five of the White Fish and Herring Industries Act, 1953, (Note: White Fish and Herring Industries Act 1953 (1 & 2 Eliz. 2. c. 17)) and section three of the White Fish and Herring Industries Act, 1957, (Note: White Fish and Herring Industries Act 1957 (5 & 6 Eliz. 2. c. 22)) and otherwise to amend the provisions as to schemes under those Acts; to authorise measures for the increase or improvement of marine resources; to make further provision for regulating the catching of sea-fish and for licensing fishing-boats; and for purposes connected with those matters. (Repealed by Sea Fish Industry Act 1970 (c. 11))
Lord High Commissioner (Church of Scotland) Act 1959 (repealed)	8 & 9 Eliz. 2. c. 8	17 December 1959
An Act to increase the allowance payable to Her Majesty's High Commissioner to the General Assembly of the Church of Scotland. (Repealed by Lord High Commissioner (Church of Scotland) Act 1974 (c. 19))
Judicial Pensions Act 1959	8 & 9 Eliz. 2. c. 9	17 December 1959
An Act to amend the law with respect to the pensions and other benefits attaching to certain high judicial offices, to regulate the age of retirement from such offices, and to increase certain pensions and other benefits granted to or in respect of persons who have held such offices.

=== Local acts ===
Short title	Citation	Royal assent
Long title
Aberdeen Harbour Order Confirmation Act 1959 (repealed)	8 & 9 Eliz. 2. c. i	17 December 1959
An Act to confirm a Provisional Order under the Private Legislation (Scotland) Act 1936 (Note: Private Legislation Procedure (Scotland) Act 1936 (26 Geo. 5 & 1 Edw. 8. c. 52)) relating to Aberdeen Harbour. (Repealed by Aberdeen Harbour Order Confirmation Act 1960 (9 & 10 Eliz. 2. c. i))
	Aberdeen Harbour Order 1959 Provisional Order to extend the period of duration of the Aberdeen Harbour Acts 1895 to 1957 and for purposes connected therewith.	
Clyde Navigation Order Confirmation Act 1959 (repealed)	8 & 9 Eliz. 2. c. ii	17 December 1959
An Act to confirm a Provisional Order under the Private Legislation (Scotland) Act 1936 relating to Clyde Navigation. (Repealed by Statute Law (Repeals) Act 1986 (c. 12))
	Clyde Navigation Order 1959 Provisional Order to extend the period for the compulsory purchase of certain lands by the Trustees of the Clyde Navigation and for other purposes.	

=== Sources ===
- The Journals of the House of Commons (PDF). Vol. 215 (October 1959 – October 1960). pp. 3–342 – via parliament.uk.
- Chronological Table of the Statutes: Covering the Period from 1235 to the End of 1971. London: Her Majesty's Stationery Office. 1972. p. 1172. ISBN 978-0-11-840096-1 – via Google Books.
- "UK Public General Acts from 1959". legislation.gov.uk. The National Archives.
- "UK Local Acts from 1959". legislation.gov.uk. The National Archives.
- "Chronological Tables of Local Acts: Part 180 (1958-1960)". legislation.gov.uk. The National Archives.

== See also ==
- List of acts of the Parliament of the United Kingdom
