= Science and Technology Act 1965 =

Act of the Parliament of the United Kingdom

Science and Technology Act 1965 (Note: Section 7.)
- Act of Parliament
- Parliament of the United Kingdom
- Long title: An Act to make further provision with respect to the responsibility and powers in relation to scientific research and related matters of the Secretary of State, the Minister of Technology and certain chartered bodies and other organisations, and for purposes connected therewith.
- Citation: 1965 c. 4
- Introduced by: 4 February 1965 Lord Champion (Lords)
- Territorial extent: United Kingdom

Dates
- Royal assent: 23 March 1965
- Commencement: 23 March 1965 (Note: The Acts of Parliament (Commencement) Act 1793.)

Other legislation
- Amends: Geological Survey Act 1845; Ministry of Health Act 1919; Mining Industry Act 1926; Petroleum (Production) Act 1934; Ministry of Supply Act 1939; Water Act 1945; Water (Scotland) Act 1946; National Health Service Act 1946; Radioactive Substances Act 1948; National Parks and Access to the Countryside Act 1949; Income Tax Act 1952; Protection of Birds Act 1954; Agricultural Research Act 1956; House of Commons Disqualification Act 1957; Atomic Energy Authority Act 1959; Deer (Scotland) Act 1959; Agricultural Research etc. (Pensions) Act 1961; Deer Act 1963; Water Resources Act 1963
- Repeals/revokes: Department of Scientific and Industrial Research Act 1956
- Amended by: Capital Allowances Act 1968; Industrial Expansion Act 1968; Minister of Technology Order 1969; Income and Corporation Taxes Act 1970; Radiological Protection Act 1970; Secretary of State for Trade and Industry Order 1970; Ministry of Aviation Supply (Dissolution) Order 1971; Nature Conservancy Council Act 1973; Nature Conservancy Council Act 1973; Statute Law (Repeals) Act 1974; Water (Scotland) Act 1980; Electricity Act 1989; Water Consolidation (Consequential Provisions) Act 1991; Transfer of Functions (Science) Order 1992; Transfer of Functions (Science) Order 1995; Statute Law (Repeals) Act 1998; Courts Act 2003; Public Services Reform (Scotland) Act 2010; Higher Education and Research Act 2017

Status: Amended

Text of statute as originally enacted

Revised text of statute as amended

Text of the Science and Technology Act 1965 as in force today (including any amendments) within the United Kingdom, from legislation.gov.uk.

The Science and Technology Act 1965 (c. 4) is an act of the Parliament of the United Kingdom which established the Science Research Council and the Natural Environment Research Council, and made provision for their financing; it reallocated certain responsibilities for research, and gave powers to the Minister of Technology.

== Background ==
The United Kingdom Government recognised in the early 1960s that there were a number of agencies responsible for conducting civil scientific research, yet these were fragmented and responsibilities were divided. These agencies had been established over the past 50 years and varied in status, scope and autonomy. The government believed that the modernisation of British industry, and the revitalisation of the economy through science and technology, could not be implemented effectively under these arrangements.

In March 1962 the government appointed a Committee of Inquiry chaired by Sir Burke Trend to examine whether any, and what, changes in the arrangements were desirable; the relative importance of the national interest for the promotion of civil scientific research; and the methods of financing of these agencies. The committee reported in October 1963. It recommended disbanding the Department of Scientific and Industrial Research (established 1915) and its council and distributing their functions to three new agencies. These were to be: the Science Research Council, the Natural Resources Research Council, and the Industrial Research and Development Authority.

The Trend Committee identified that the Medical Research Council (1913), the Agricultural Research Council (1931), the National Research Development Corporation (1948) and the UK Atomic Energy Authority (1954) should remain largely unchanged.

The Trend Committee report was accepted by the Conservative government. However, the enabling legislation could not be passed before the general election was called in October 1964. The incoming Labour government largely endorsed the Trend Committee recommendations, with the exception of the proposals for industrial research, for which the government established the Ministry of Technology.

The 1965 act established the other agencies identified by the Trend Committee: the Science Research Council and the Natural Environment (not Resources) Research Council.

== Science and Technology Act 1965 ==
The Science and Technology Act 1965 (c. 4) received royal assent on 23 March 1965. Its long title is: ‘An Act to make further provision with respect to the responsibility and powers in relation to scientific research and related matters of the Secretary of State, the Minister of Technology and certain chartered bodies and other organisations, and for purposes connected therewith.’

=== Provisions ===
The act comprises 7 sections and 4 schedules.

- Section 1. The Research Councils. The Research Councils shall be the Agricultural Research Council and the Medical Research Council; and two bodies to be established: the Science Research Council and the Natural Environment Research Council; the roles of these bodies.
- Section 2. Expenses, accounts etc. of Research Councils. The Secretary of State may pay the Research Councils out of money provided by Parliament.
- Section 3. Re-allocation of activities connected with scientific research. The Department of Scientific and Industrial Research shall be dissolved and its functions taken over by an appropriate Research Council; the National Institute for Research in Nuclear Science shall be taken over by the Science Research Council; the activities of the Nature Conservancy and the National Oceanographic Council shall be taken over by the Natural Environment Research Council.
- Section 4. Extension of research functions of Atomic Energy Authority. Functions shall include the undertaking of scientific research in matters not connected with atomic energy.
- Section 5. Further powers of Secretary of State and Minister of Technology. The Secretary of State and the Minister of Technology may defray out of moneys provided by Parliament any expenses which, with the consent of the Treasury, they may incur.
- Section 6. Supplementary. Defines ‘scientific research’, and amends the legislation specified in Schedule 4.
- Section 7. Short title.

Schedules

- Schedule 1. Reports, Accounts etc. of Research Councils. Keeping and submission of accounts to the Minister and Secretary of State.
- Schedule 2. Minor and consequential Amendments. Minor legislative amendments.
- Schedule 3. Transitional Provisions on Redistribution of Activities of existing Organisations. Transfer of all property, rights, liabilities and obligations on an agreed transfer date.
- Schedule 4. Repeals. Repeal of legislation.

== Aftermath ==
The Agricultural Research Council (ARC) was reformed as the Agricultural and Food Research Council (AFRC) in 1983, which became part of the Biotechnology and Biological Sciences Research Council (BBSRC) in 1994.

The Science Research Council (SRC) became the Science and Engineering Research Council (SERC) in 1984.

The Medical Research Council and the Natural Environment Research Council both still operate under their original names.

== Subsequent developments ==
Schedule 4 to the act, except the entry relating to the Atomic Energy Authority Act 1959, together with parts of schedule 2, were repealed by section 1 of, and part XI of the schedule to, the Statute Law (Repeals) Act 1974, which came into force on 27 June 1974.
