= Atomic Energy Authority Act 1954 =

Act of the Parliament of the United Kingdom

Atomic Energy Authority Act 1954 (Note: Section 10.)
- Act of Parliament
- Parliament of the United Kingdom
- Long title: An Act to provide for the setting up of an Atomic Energy Authority for the United Kingdom, to make provision as to their powers, duties, rights and liabilities, to amend, consequentially on the establishment of and otherwise in connection with that Authority, the Atomic Energy Act, 1946, the Radioactive Substances Act, 1948, and certain other enactments, and for purposes connected with the matters aforesaid.
- Citation: 2 & 3 Eliz. 2. c. 32
- Introduced by: Second Reading 1 March 1954 by the Minister of Works (Sir David Eccles) (Commons)
- Territorial extent: England and Wales; Scotland; Northern Ireland (Note: Section 9.)

Dates
- Royal assent: 4 June 1954
- Commencement: 4 June 1954 (Note: The Acts of Parliament (Commencement) Act 1793.)
Other legislation
Amends	Atomic Energy Act 1946; Radioactive Substances Act 1948; Patents Act 1949
Amended by	Atomic Energy Authority Act 1959; Income and Corporation Taxes Act 1970; Atomic Energy Authority (Weapons Group) Act 1973; Atomic Energy Authority (Special Constables) Act 1976; Nuclear Safeguards and Electricity (Finance) Act 1978; Atomic Energy (Miscellaneous Provisions) Act 1981; Acquisition of Land Act 1981; Energy Act 1983; Atomic Energy Authority Act 1986; Official Secrets Act 1989; Statute Law (Repeals) Act 1993; Nuclear Safeguards Act 2000; Statute Law (Repeals) Act 2004

Status: Amended

Text of statute as originally enacted

Revised text of statute as amended

Text of the Atomic Energy Authority Act 1954 as in force today (including any amendments) within the United Kingdom, from legislation.gov.uk.

The Atomic Energy Authority Act 1954 (2 & 3 Eliz. 2. c. 32) is an act of the Parliament of the United Kingdom which established the United Kingdom Atomic Energy Authority with powers to produce, use and dispose of atomic energy and to carry out research into this and related matters.

== Background ==
From 1948, the regulation of atomic energy was principally governed by two acts of Parliament: the Atomic Energy Act 1946 (9 & 10 Geo. 6. c. 80) and the Radioactive Substances Act 1948 (11 & 12 Geo. 6. c. 37). The 1946 act had transferred the responsibility for work on atomic energy from the Department of Scientific and Industrial Research to the Ministry of Supply. In December 1953, Parliament agreed to the transfer of ministerial responsibility for atomic energy from the Minister of Supply to the Lord President of the Council. This was expedient as the Lord President was a senior member of the Cabinet who had no departmental interest in the use of atomic energy.

The 1954 act further developed government oversight, it transferred powers relating to research, development and disposal of radioactive substances from the Lord President to the new United Kingdom Atomic Energy Authority established under the act. Under this arrangement the duties of the Minister and the Authority were clearly defined. Policy remained the responsibility of the Government while the Authority was given the freedom to operate that policy strategically and efficiently.

== Provisions ==
The act comprises ten sections and three schedules.

- Section 1. The United Kingdom Atomic Energy Authority. Established the UKAEA, its chairman and members, remuneration.
- Section 2. Functions of the authority. To produce, use and dispose of atomic energy and carry out research; to manufacture or otherwise produce any radioactive substances.
- Section 3. Power and duties of the Lord President of the Council in relation to the authority. To promote and control the development of atomic energy; the power to give the authority directions.
- Section 4. Financial provisions as to the Authority. The Lord President to pay the authority monies provided by Parliament.
- Section 5. Powers as to purchase of land, carrying out works, etc. The Lord President may authorise the authority to purchase compulsorily any land.
- Section 6. Miscellaneous provisions as to the Authority. Land to be deemed Crown property; application of Official Secrets Act 1911 to properties.
- Section 7. Machinery for settling terms and conditions of employment of staff, etc. Terms and conditions of employment; safety, health and welfare of persons
- Section 8. Interpretation. Interpretation of the Atomic Energy Act 1946, and the Radioactive Substances Act 1948.
- Section 9. Application to Northern Ireland. The Act applied to Northern Ireland.
- Section 10. Short title and citation. The act may be cited as the Atomic Energy Authority Act 1954

Schedules

- First schedule. Provisions as to the United Kingdom Atomic Energy Authority. Comprising nine paragraphs.
- Second schedule. Transfer of property rights and liabilities from the Lord President of the council to the authority. Comprising four paragraphs.
- Third schedule. Adaptations and modifications of enactments. The Atomic Energy Act 1946, the Radioactive Substances Act 1948, and the Official Secrets Act 1911, plus others

== Aftermath ==
The United Kingdom Atomic Energy Authority (UKAEA) was established on 19 July 1954 with the power "to produce, use and dispose of atomic energy and carry out research into any matters therewith".

The UKAEA developed a civil nuclear reactor programme including two nuclear power stations in 1957 (Berkeley and Bradwell), a further two in 1959 and eight more in the early 1960s.

The act was amended by the Atomic Energy Authority Act 1959 (8 & 9 Eliz. 2. c. 5), the Atomic Energy (Miscellaneous Provisions) Act 1981, and the Atomic Energy Authority Act 1986.

== See also ==
- Atomic Energy Authority Act
- United Kingdom Atomic Energy Authority
- UK Atomic Energy Authority Constabulary
- Nuclear power in the United Kingdom
- Atomic Energy Research Establishment
