= Atomic Energy Authority Act 1971 =

Act of the Parliament of the United Kingdom

Atomic Energy Authority Act 1971 (Note: Section 25(1).)
- Act of Parliament
- Parliament of the United Kingdom
- Long title: An Act to provide for the transfer to British Nuclear Fuels Limited and The Radiochemical Centre Limited of parts of the undertaking of the United Kingdom Atomic Energy Authority and of property, rights, liabilities and obligations appertaining to those parts of the Authority's undertaking; to make provision with respect to persons employed by the Authority and engaged in those parts of the Authority's undertaking, with respect to the control and finances of the said companies, and with respect to the application of pension schemes maintained by the Authority; to amend the provisions of the Nuclear Installations Act 1965 relating to permits under section 2 of that Act; to make provision relating to factories, offices, building operations and other works on sites in respect of which such permits are in force; to provide for the application of security provisions where such permits are in force and also where companies are designated by the Secretary of State in connection with an agreement relating to the gas centrifuge process for producing enriched uranium; and for purposes connected with those matters.
- Citation: 1971 c. 11
- Introduced by: Sir John Eden, Minister for Industry, Second Reading 17 December 1970 (Commons)
- Territorial extent: England and Wales; Scotland; Northern Ireland (in part); (Note: Section 25(2).)

Dates
- Royal assent: 16 March 1971
- Commencement: 16 March 1971 (Note: The Acts of Parliament (Commencement) Act 1793.)
Other legislation
Amends	Nuclear Installations Act 1965
Amended by	Atomic Energy Authority (Special Constables) Act 1976; Nuclear Industry (Finance) Act 1977; Atomic Energy (Miscellaneous Provisions) Act 1981; Official Secrets Act 1989; Statute Law (Repeals) Act 1993; Employment Tribunals Act 1996; Employment Rights Act 1996; Anti-terrorism, Crime and Security Act 2001; Statute Law (Repeals) Act 2004; Energy Act 2004; Companies Act 2006 (Commencement No. 3, Consequential Amendments, Transitional Provisions and Savings) Order 2007

Status: Amended

Text of statute as originally enacted

Revised text of statute as amended

Text of the Atomic Energy Authority Act 1971 as in force today (including any amendments) within the United Kingdom, from legislation.gov.uk.

The Atomic Energy Authority Act 1971 (c. 11) is an act of the Parliament of the United Kingdom. The principal effect of the act was to transfer certain functions, property and responsibilities of the United Kingdom Atomic Energy Authority to two newly established organisations, namely the British Nuclear Fuels Limited and The Radiochemical Centre Limited.

== Rationale ==
The government believed the Fuel Production Group and the Radiochemical Centre of the United Kingdom Atomic Energy Authority would be better served if they were run as ordinary companies with powers to raise capital and enter into partnerships.

== Provisions ==
The Atomic Energy Authority Act 1971 (c. 11) received royal assent on 16 March 1971.

The act comprises 25 Sections in four Parts, plus one Schedule.

Transfer of parts of Authority's undertaking

- 1. Transfer of part of Authority's undertaking to Nuclear Fuels Company
- 2. Transfer of part of Authority's undertaking to Radiochemical Company
- 3. Exclusions from transfers in respect of patents and other industrial property
- 4. Use of certain lands, premises, apparatus, facilities and services
- 5. Powers of Secretary of State in relation to transfers under sections 1 and 2
- 6. Supplementary provisions relating to transfers
- 7. Issue of shares in consideration of transfers

Provisions as to employees

- 8. Employees in transferred parts of undertaking
- 9. Machinery for settling terms and conditions of employment
- 10. Supplementary provisions relating to contracts of employment

Control and finances of the companies

- 11. Provisions as to shares in the companies
- 12. Loans by Secretary of State to the companies
- 13. Limits on payments under Sections 11 and 12
- 14. Accounts of companies to be laid before Parliament
- 15. Powers for Authority to provide services and facilities for the companies
- 16. Treatment of transferred assets for purposes of investment grants

Miscellaneous and supplementary provisions

- 17. Permits under Nuclear Installations Act 1965, Section 2
- 18. Inspection of factories, works and offices on sites for which permits are in force
- 19. Application of security provisions to companies established in connection with agreement on gas centrifuge process
- 20. Pension schemes
- 21. Savings and transitional provisions
- 22. Stamp duty
- 23. Financial provisions
- 24. Interpretation and supplementary provisions
- 25. Short title and extent

Schedule

Insert as Schedule 1 to the Nuclear Installations Act 1965

== Consequences of the act ==
British Nuclear Fuels Limited (BNFL) was established in February 1971. Under the provisions of the Atomic Energy Authority Act 1971 the nuclear fuel business of the Production Group of the UKAEA was transferred to BNFL. This included the nuclear fuel and weapons material producing activities and the Calder Hall and Chapelcross nuclear stations, together with the facilities at Capenhurst, Springfields and Windscale. BNFL started independent activity on 1 April 1971. At the same time the production of medical and industrial radioisotopes was transferred from UKAEA to the Radiochemical Centre Limited which became Amersham International Limited in 1981. Following these demergers the UKAEA remit was solely for atomic energy research activities.

Various sections and subsections of the 1971 Act have been repealed.

== See also ==
- United Kingdom Atomic Energy Authority
- Atomic Energy Authority Act
- Atomic Energy Research Establishment
- Atomic Weapons Research Establishment
- Nuclear weapons and the United Kingdom
- Amersham plc
