= Atomic Energy Authority Act 1986 =

Act of the Parliament of the United Kingdom

Atomic Energy Authority Act 1986 (Note: Section 10(1).)
- Act of Parliament
- Parliament of the United Kingdom
- Long title: An Act to put the finances of the United Kingdom Atomic Energy Authority on a trading fund basis; and for connected purposes.
- Citation: 1986 c. 3
- Introduced by: Under Secretary of State for Energy (Mr Alistair Goodlad) Second Reading (Commons)
- Territorial extent: England and Wales; Scotland; Northern Ireland; (Note: Section 10(3).)

Dates
- Royal assent: 19 February 1986
- Commencement: 1 April 1986 (Note: Section 10(2).)
Other legislation
Amends	Atomic Energy Authority Act 1954
Amended by	Copyright, Designs and Patents Act 1988; Companies Act 1989; Companies Act 2006 (Consequential Amendments, Transitional Provisions and Savings) Order 2009

Status: Amended

Text of statute as originally enacted

Revised text of statute as amended

Text of the Atomic Energy Authority Act 1986 as in force today (including any amendments) within the United Kingdom, from legislation.gov.uk.

The Atomic Energy Authority Act 1986 (c. 3) is an act of the Parliament of the United Kingdom. The effect of the act was to put the finances of the United Kingdom Atomic Energy Authority (UKAEA) on a trading fund basis, such that what the Authority charged its customers included an element of profit.

The act received royal assent on 19 February 1986.

== Rationale ==
In 1984 the Secretary of State for Energy instigated a review of the UKAEA. This established that about half of the UKAEA's annual expenditure of £400 million was grant-in-aid from the Department of Energy. The remainder was from contract work from the electricity supply industry, BNFL and others. The review recommended that the Authority should be operated on a fully commercial basis and that more work should be funded by the nuclear industry. The act made the net assets of the Authority a debt due to the Secretary of State. The Authority was empowered to borrow up to £150 million, or £200 million with the consent of the Secretary of State.

== Provisions ==
The act comprised ten sections in three parts:

The authority's finances

1. Commencing capital debt

2. Borrowing powers

3. Limit on borrowing

4. Loans from the Secretary of State

5. Treasury guarantees

Other provisions relating to the authority

6. Supervisory powers of Secretary of State

7. Remuneration and compensation of members of the Authority

8. Powers of Authority with respect to exploitation of results of research

General

9. Interpretation

10. Short title, commencement and extent

Section 1 of the act required the UKAEA to assume, in respect of its net assets on 1 April 1986, a "commencing capital debt" due to the Secretary of State, of an amount that he specified by notice in writing after consulting the Authority and with the approval of the Treasury. The debt was deemed to have been assumed on that date, and a sum equal to it was deemed to have been issued to the Secretary of State out of the National Loans Fund. Section 2 of the act allows the Authority to borrow in sterling from the Secretary of State, to borrow in any currency from other persons with his consent or under a general authority given by him, and to borrow from a wholly owned subsidiary without any consent. The Authority must control its subsidiaries so that they do not borrow from anyone outside the group without the same consent or authority.

Section 3 of the act limits the aggregate principal outstanding in respect of borrowing by the Authority and its wholly owned subsidiaries, guarantees of borrowing, the commencing capital debt, and sums issued by the Treasury in fulfilment of guarantees, to £150 million or such greater sum, not exceeding £200 million, as the Secretary of State specifies by order. Section 4 of the act allows the Secretary of State to lend to the Authority, with the approval of the Treasury, repayable with interest as he directs, and requires him to prepare an annual account of the loans for examination by the Comptroller and Auditor General. Section 5 of the act allows the Treasury to guarantee borrowing by the Authority and its subsidiaries from persons other than the Secretary of State, requires statements of guarantees to be laid before each House of Parliament, and requires the Authority or subsidiary to repay with interest any sums issued in fulfilment of a guarantee.

Section 6 of the act requires the Authority to act on lines settled with the approval of the Secretary of State, to settle general programmes of work involving capital outlay, and not to carry out a project involving substantial capital outlay except in accordance with an approved programme. It does not affect the power of the Secretary of State to give directions under section 3 of the Atomic Energy Authority Act 1954 (2 & 3 Eliz. 2. c. 32). Section 7 of the act amended section 1 of the 1954 act by repealing subsection (8), the duty to lay statements of members' remuneration before Parliament, and by inserting subsections (8A) and (8B), which allow the terms of appointment of a member to entitle him to compensation on ceasing to be a member and allow the Secretary of State, with the approval of the Treasury, to require the Authority to pay compensation in special circumstances. Section 8 of the act gives the Authority power, and deems it always to have had power, to exploit commercially intellectual property resulting from its research and development or at its disposal under arrangements for exchanging or collaborating on research.

Section 9 of the act defines "the Authority" and gives "subsidiary" and "wholly owned subsidiary" the meaning they have in company law. Section 10 of the act provides the short title, brings the act into force on 1 April 1986 or, if later, the day it was passed, and extends it to England and Wales, Scotland and Northern Ireland.

== Subsequent developments ==
The limit in section 3(1) of the act was raised to £200 million, the maximum that the section permits, by the United Kingdom Atomic Energy Authority (Limit on Borrowing) Order 1991 (SI 1991/1736), which came into force on 25 July 1991.

== See also ==
- Atomic Energy Authority Act
- Atomic Energy Research Establishment
- Atomic Weapons Research Establishment
- Nuclear weapons and the United Kingdom
