= Nuclear Installations Act 1969 =

Act of the Parliament of the United Kingdom

Nuclear Installations Act 1969 (Note: Section 5(1).)
- Act of Parliament
- Parliament of the United Kingdom
- Long title: An Act to Make in the Nuclear Installations Act 1965 Certain Amendments Necessary to Bring that Act into Conformity with International Agreements
- Citation: 1969 c. 18
- Territorial extent: United Kingdom

Dates
- Royal assent: 16 May 1969
- Commencement: 16 May 1969 (Note: The Acts of Parliament (Commencement) Act 1793.)
- Repealed: 1 January 2022

Other legislation
- Amended by: Energy Act 1983
- Repealed by: Nuclear Installations (Liability for Damage) Order 2016

Status: Repealed

Text of statute as originally enacted

Revised text of statute as amended

The Nuclear Installations Act 1969 (c. 18) was an act of the Parliament of the United Kingdom. Its effect was to amend the Nuclear Installations Act 1965 to make it comply with international agreements. The act was subsequently repealed.

== Rationale ==
The act made amendments to the Nuclear Installations Act 1965 in compliance with three International Conventions:

- the International Atomic Energy Agency's Vienna Convention of May 1963
- the Organisation for European Co-operation and Development's Paris Convention of July 1960
- the Organisation for European Co-operation and Development's Brussels Convention of January 1964

The conventions address the liability for third-party damage in the event of a nuclear accident.

== Provisions ==
The long title of the act is "An Act to Make in the Nuclear Installations Act 1965 Certain Amendments Necessary to Bring that Act into Conformity with International Agreements".

The act received royal assent on 16 May 1969.

The act consisted of five sections:

- Section 1. Restriction of liability for certain damage.
- Section 2. Adjustment of certain amounts.
- Section 3. Extension of compensation in certain cases.
- Section 4. Expenses.
- Section 5. Citation.

The act was repealed by the Nuclear Installations (Liability for Damage) Order 2016 (S.I. 2016/562).

== See also ==
- Atomic Energy Authority Act
- Atomic Energy Research Establishment
- Atomic Weapons Research Establishment
- Nuclear weapons and the United Kingdom
