= Atomic Energy Authority (Weapons Group) Act 1973 =

Act of the Parliament of the United Kingdom

Atomic Energy Authority (Weapons Group) Act 1973 (Note: Section 10.)
- Act of Parliament
- Parliament of the United Kingdom
- Long title: An Act to transfer to the Secretary of State the Weapons Group of the United Kingdom Atomic Energy Authority, and for connected purposes; and to modify section 2 of the Atomic Energy Authority Act 1954 in respect of the Authority’s power to do work on explosive nuclear devices.
- Citation: 1973 c. 4
- Introduced by: Minister of State for Defence (Mr. Ian Gilmour) Second Reading 30 January 1973 (Commons)
- Territorial extent: United Kingdom

Dates
- Royal assent: 6 March 1973
- Commencement: 6 March 1974 (Note: The Acts of Parliament (Commencement) Act 1793.)

Other legislation
- Amends: Registered Designs Act 1949; Atomic Energy Authority Act 1954
- Amended by: Patents Act 1977; Statute Law (Repeals) Act 2004

Status: Amended

Text of statute as originally enacted

Revised text of statute as amended

Text of the Atomic Energy Authority (Weapons Group) Act 1973 as in force today (including any amendments) within the United Kingdom, from legislation.gov.uk.

The Atomic Energy Authority (Weapons Group) Act 1973 (c. 4) is an act of the Parliament of the United Kingdom. The effect of the act was to transfer the functions, property, liabilities and responsibilities related to atomic weapons from the Weapons Group of the United Kingdom Atomic Energy Authority to the Ministry of Defence.

== Rationale ==
In 1971 the Government had commissioned a committee to inquire into the effectiveness of the organisation of government and defence procurement. The committee, chaired by Sir Derek Rayner, reported that defence procurement activities from research to production should be brought together within the Ministry of Defence. The Government accepted the recommendations of the Rayner report and the Atomic Energy Authority (Weapons Group) Act 1973 was enacted to formally transfer the Weapons Group of the United Kingdom Atomic Energy Authority to the Ministry of Defence.

== Provisions ==
The Atomic Energy Authority (Weapons Group) Act 1973 received Royal Assent on 6 March 1973. It comprises ten Sections plus one Schedule.

- Section 1. Transfer of Atomic Energy Authority Weapons Group to Secretary of State.
- Section 2. Weapons Group employees.
- Section 3. Powers of Secretary of State in relation to transfer under Section 1.
- Section 4. General transitional provisions.
- Section 5. Additional provision as to technical information, etc.
- Section 6. Powers of Authority in relation to atomic weapons development, etc.
- Section 7. Stamp duty.
- Section 8. Financial provisions.
- Section 9. Interpretation and supplementary provisions.
- Section 10. Citation.

Schedule

Patent and other Rights reserved to Atomic Energy Authority

=== Subsequent repeals ===
Various sections and subsections of the 1973 Act have subsequently been repealed.

== See also ==
- United Kingdom Atomic Energy Authority
- Atomic Energy Authority Act
- Atomic Energy Research Establishment
- Atomic Weapons Research Establishment
- Nuclear weapons and the United Kingdom
