= UK Atomic Energy Authority Constabulary =

Former police service of the United Kingdom

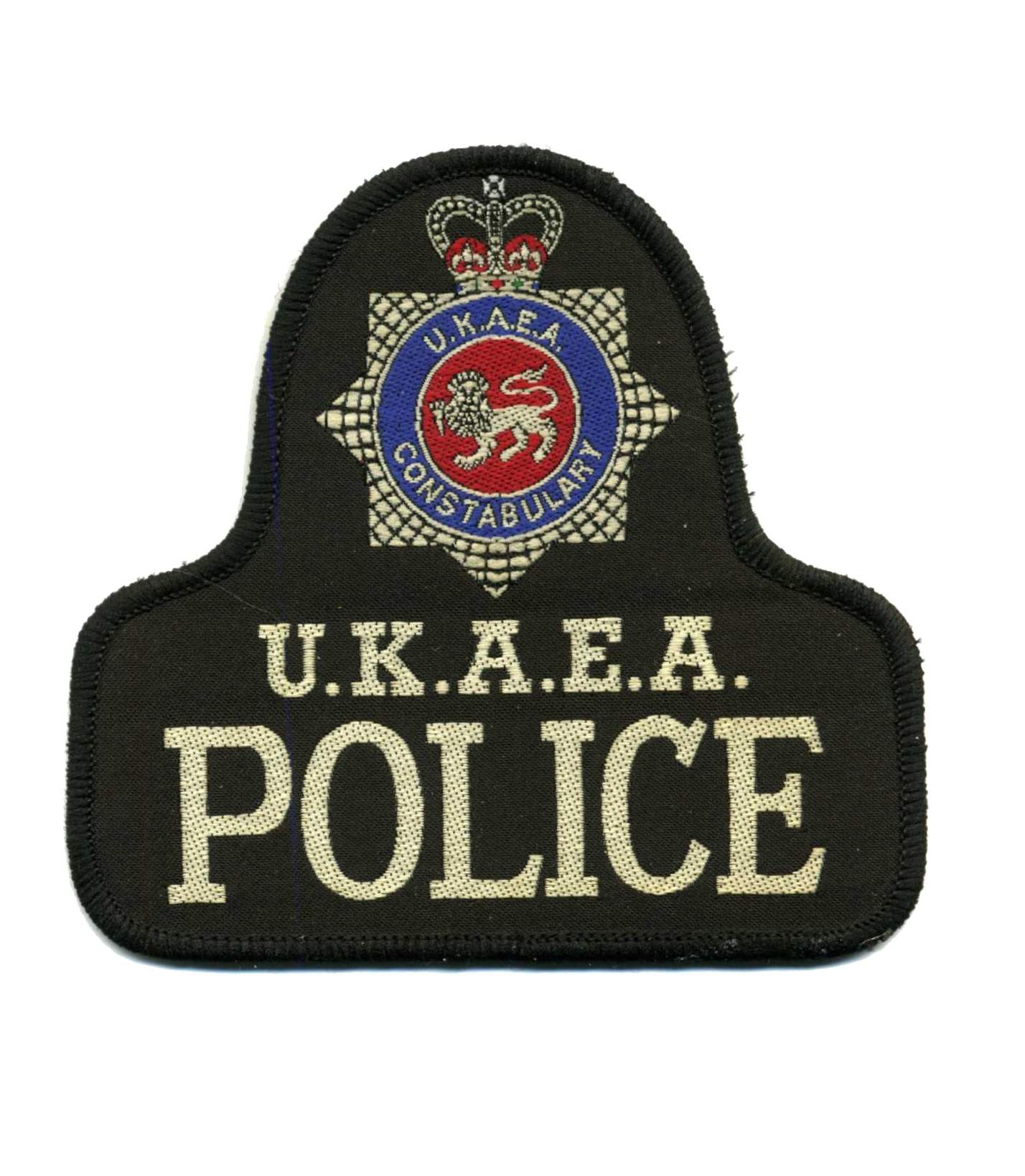
Constabulary's patch

The United Kingdom Atomic Energy Authority Constabulary was the armed security police force of the United Kingdom Atomic Energy Authority. The force existed for 50 years, operating from 1955, until 1 April 2005.

== Establishment ==
The constabulary was established under the provisions of the Atomic Energy Authority Act 1954 (2 & 3 Eliz. 2. c. 32) which had established the United Kingdom Atomic Energy Authority. The powers of the constabulary were extended by the Atomic Energy Authority (Special Constables) Act 1976 (c. 23).

== Organisation ==
The force was made up of 650 armed personnel (the majority of whom were from the UKAEA Constabulary), protecting sixteen atomic sites and protecting transportation of nuclear materials around the United Kingdom and abroad. At that time UKAEAC/CNC came under the Department for Trade and Industry.

== Abolition ==
On 1 April 2005, the Civil Nuclear Constabulary (CNC) was established in adherence to the Energy Act 2004, replacing the UKAEA Constabulary. The new force was intended to have specialist attributes needed to combat the possibility of terrorist threats and it was seen as an essential part of making the force independent of any one of the nuclear operators.
