= Remote Applications in Challenging Environments =

Robotics test centre near Oxford, England

RACE
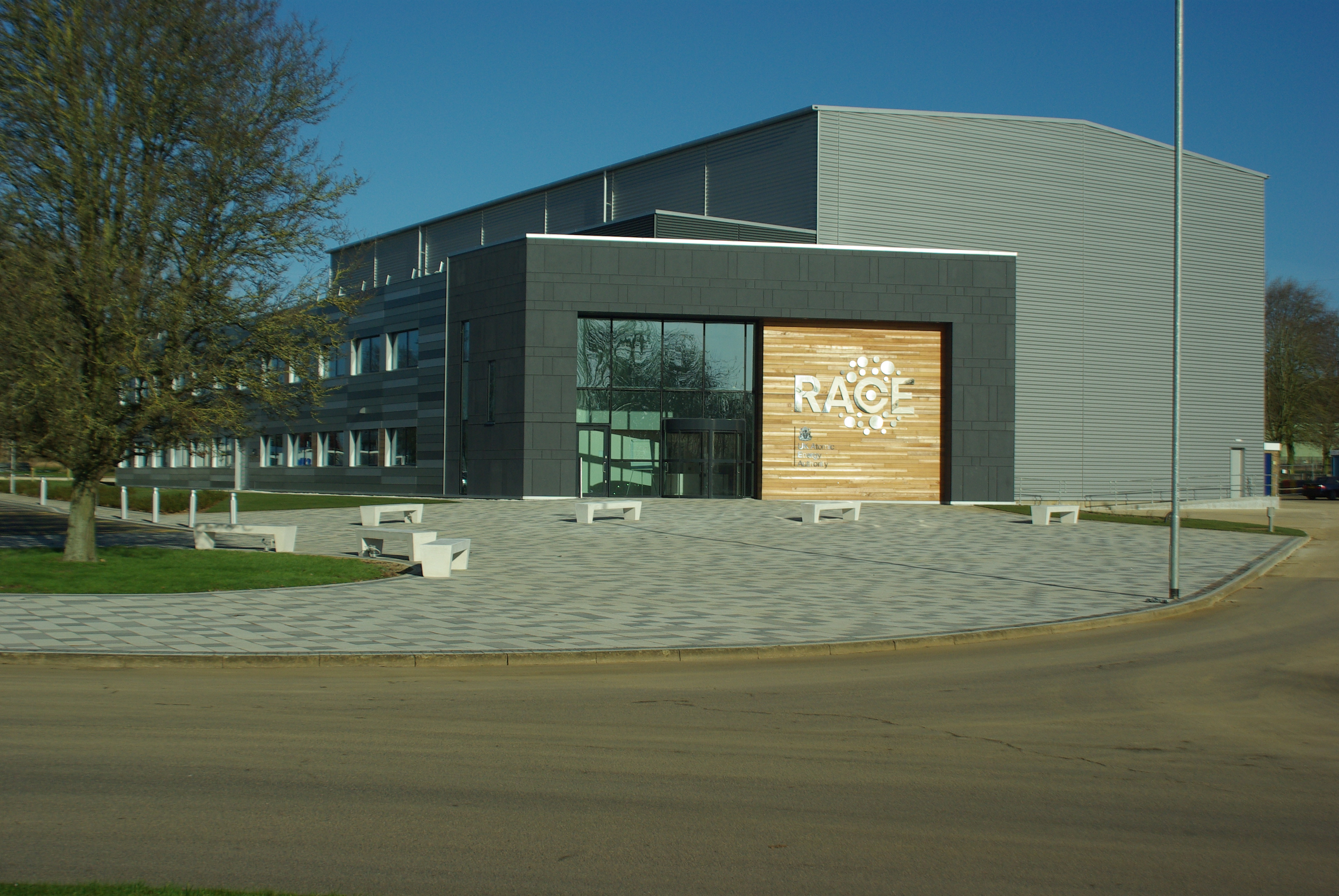
- RACE (Remote Applications in Challenging Environments)
- Abbreviation: RACE
- Formation: 2014
- Type: Research association/institute
- Location: Culham Centre for Fusion Energy Culham, Oxfordshire, United Kingdom
- Region served: Worldwide
- Parent organization: UKAEA
- Affiliations: The Welding Institute, National Physical Laboratory (United Kingdom)
- Website: http://www.race.ukaea.uk/

Remote Applications in Challenging Environments (RACE) is a remote handling and robotics test facility located at Culham Science Centre near Oxford, UK, operated by UKAEA. As part of the UK Government's Robotics and Autonomous Systems Strategy (RAS) this is one of the initiatives that is supporting development and growth in remote handling. RACE uses the broad range of expertise from UKAEA and CCFE's past experience in remote handling used on JET (Joint European Torus).

RACE defines a ‘challenging environment’ as one in which conditions make it impossible or unacceptable for people to conduct useful work. The physical challenges to overcome might include high radiation, extreme temperatures, limited access, operation in vacuum and magnetic fields. Combinations of such conditions are routinely found in sectors including nuclear, space, petrochemical, construction and mining. RACE is partnering with industry and academia to use other skills in robotics and remote handling to develop solutions that work reliably, safely and cost effectively in the most extreme environments imaginable. RACE's long-term goal is to design and operate plant and machinery for long periods with zero manual intervention.

== History ==
While its current form was created in 2014, RACE traces its origins to UKAEA Remote Handling (also known as Telerobotics) teams which have supported the Joint European Torus nuclear fusion experiment since the 1980s. Remote operations in-vessel at JET have included, cutting, welding, bolting and handling of approximately 7000 components in the change of all the tiles in JET to the ITER-like wall.

== Directors ==
- 2014–present: Dr Rob Buckingham

== Current activities ==
=== Typical RACE activities ===
- Use extensive design, application and operations expertise to develop solutions that work reliably, safely and cost effectively.
- Develop complete operational management systems that allow critical, delicate and complex components to be maintained and replaced, reliably and remotely.
- Collaborate with academia to create an innovation pipeline for new ideas.
- Partner with industry, offering technical consultancy, mechanical design, control systems and operations expertise.

=== Supporting the Remote Handling of JET ===
JET is the world's largest operation experimental tokamak nuclear fusion reactor. Bombardment by high-energy neutrons produced in the nuclear fusion reactions are able to activate some components and support structures, rendering them radioactive for long periods of time. This was most severe after the first DT (Deuterium/Tritium) experiments on JET in 1997. Furthermore, many plasma facing tiles are covered in beryllium, which, if breathed in as dust, poses a further hazard to anyone working inside the reactor. Therefore, JET has always placed great emphasis on its Remote Handling, to ensure a maximum of tasks can be carried out fully remotely.

Two 12m long snake-like booms reach into the vacuum vessel delivering cameras and tools to enable operators to work remotely.

The primary tool is MASCOT, a haptic Local-Remote manipulator, that allows the operator to feel every action, such as carrying a new component or tightening a bolt. Nine shutdowns have been completed using this system.

The JET machine is a complex device where the detailed configuration changes as the physics experimental requirements dictate. The Remote Handling system is required to fulfil two functions:

- Repair of any system failure stops the experiment
- Modification of torus components for new experiments

Experience shows that Remote Handling interventions achieve higher precision and introduce less impurities than sending people inside the torus as they did in the past.

JET is a challenging environment for robotics: high radiation dose, elevated temperatures, limited access, large complex equipment and some critical path inspection and maintenance procedures that must be completed reliably and without failure.

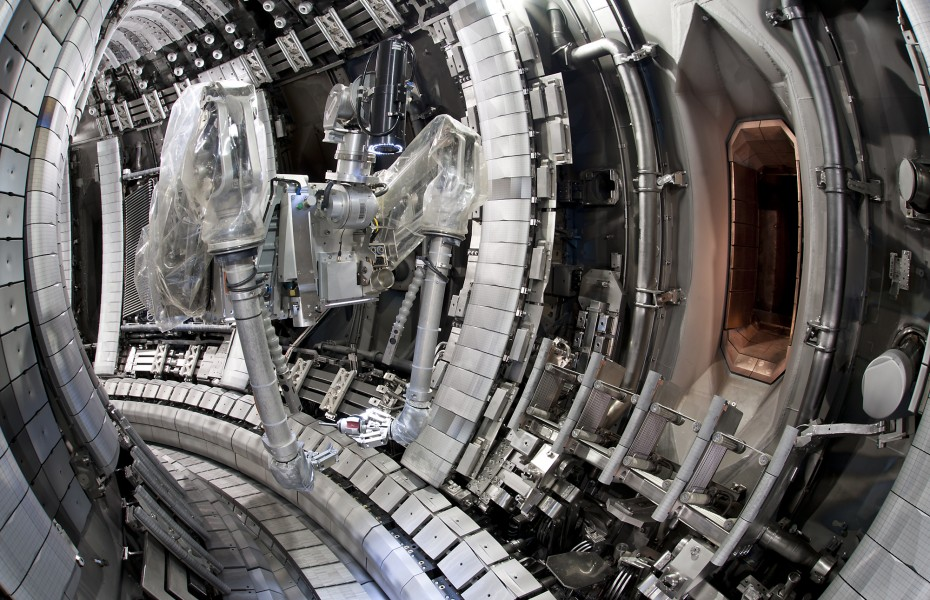
MASCOT Telemanipulator in JET (Joint European Torus) vessel

=== Development for ITER ===
RACE will be developing robotics solutions for the ITER international fusion experiment in Cadarache, France.

Remote operations and maintenance will be critical for the effective and efficient operation of the ITER machine in the full nuclear phase. Some areas that require inspection or maintenance will not be manually accessible due to radiation and lack of space and will require deployment of bespoke remote maintenance systems. RACE is supporting industry in the development of a number of critical remote handling systems including the Divertor Remote Handling System (RHS), Neutral Beam RHS and Cask & Plug RHS.

=== Developing the Remote Handling strategies for DEMO ===
DEMO is the conceptual demonstration fusion power plant using all of the knowledge gained in nuclear fusion to create a commercial power plant.

After ITER, DEMO will supply fusion electricity to the grid and will demonstrate fusion's feasibility as a power source. RACE plays a leading role in developing DEMO's Remote Handling concepts. It is recognised that remote maintenance will be device defining and mission critical for future fusion power plants. A fusion reactor must be designed to be maintained remotely by bespoke remotely operated tools. Furthermore, during operations any failure of these tools will affect plant availability and hence impact commercial viability.

RACE has refurbished a large manipulator, called the Telescopic Articulated Remote Manipulator (TARM), to use as a research test bed for heavy payload manipulation with a flexible, hyper redundant mechanism. This research will establish whether the concepts have potential to be developed into validated engineering designs that can be delivered within cost and reliability parameters required to deliver commercially viable base load electricity from fusion.

=== European Spallation Source Active Cell Facility ===
RACE in partnership with the Science & Technology Facilities Council is facilitating a major contract to design, manufacture and install remotely operated equipment in the Active Cell Facility of the European Spallation Source (ESS) which is under construction in Lund, Sweden.

The Active Cell Facility will receive activated components from the ESS target station which contains a rotating tungsten target wheel. The target wheel will need to be exchanged every few years. It needs to be processed and packaged before being shipped to a long-term waste store.

Due to the size of the target wheel the Active Cell Facility is a 12m by 12m by 12m reinforced concrete cell. Operations within a closed box of this size cannot be conducted using through-wall manipulators so the design relies on remotely operated equipment delivered by two remotely operated cranes. The cell has no windows, so operators sat in adjacent rooms will use multiple cameras to control the various handling and size reduction processes. Equipment in the cell will consist of cutting equipment for size reduction, power manipulators (aka robots), cranes, shielding and transit cases. Tasks to be conducted include processing, repair, refurbishment, testing and disposal of large activated components.

=== System of systems control ===
A common thread in all of RACE's activities is ‘system of systems’ control. JET, ITER, DEMO and ESS are examples of complex systems reliant on efficient, collaborative operation of multiple robotic devices.

As the complexity of robotics and autonomous systems grows, systems will need to be adapted and combined in different ways to achieve unique functionalities. Furthermore, the ability to plan to cope with regular software and hardware updates and equipment obsolescence is required. RACE has developed integrated digital tools including virtual reality, augmented reality, haptics, operations management and condition monitoring for simulation and real hardware control. At the heart of this digital toolkit is a ‘system of systems’ network protocol.

This software has been designed to enable ‘self-describing’ hardware to offer and request data from other members. This addresses the perennial problem of obsolescence and rapidly changing networks and it also enables software tools, including user interfaces, to access and control the full range of hardware devices and sensors. The prototype software has been used to control bespoke and commercial off-the shelf equipment from multiple vendors. It enables the use of all modern technologies regardless of the vendor or the platform type.

=== Hosting autonomous vehicle testing ===
With such a new technology it is essential to establish test facilities that allow interested stakeholders to explore the technical, commercial, ethical, legal and social issues. RACE has access to 10 kilometres of roads, junctions, roundabouts, traffic lights and pedestrian crossings within the secure Culham site.

In partnership with Millbrook (part of Spectris Plc) RACE has won funding from the Centre for Connected and Autonomous Vehicles to host part of the UK's CAV Testbed. Four locations will be promoted globally by Meridian and used to explore all issues regarding the deployment of autonomous vehicles including mobility as a service.

RACE is also part of the DRIVEN consortium which is developing a fleet of six vehicles which will drive autonomously (with an onboard safety driver) from Oxford to London in 2019. Oxbotica, the autonomous vehicle spin out from Oxford University, has been using the roads around RACE for more than 12 months and has accumulated more than 5000 km of Level 4 autonomous vehicle driving.

Additional investment has been secured to develop a ‘CAV Pit Lane’ for use by developers. RACE will become a hub for autonomous vehicle testing working with vehicle manufacturers, software companies, insurers, regulators, councils, service providers and the public.

=== RACE TEST - Testing, Evaluating, Standardising and Training ===
The comprehensive suite of standard test methods enables independent evaluation of robotic capabilities with quantifiable results. Standards have been developed to measure remote systems’ mobility, sensors, energy consumption, communications, dexterity, durability, reliability, logistics, safety, autonomy, and operator proficiency.

These methods will help robotics developers evaluate performance against user needs, help guide purchasing and deployment decisions, and provide focused training for operators.

RACE TEST is a neutral test facility that is independent from manufacturers, enabling an open comparison of system performance.
