= Nuclear Installations Act 1965 =

Act of the Parliament of the United Kingdom

Nuclear Installations Act 1965 (Note: Section 30(1).)
- Act of Parliament
- Parliament of the United Kingdom
- Long title: An Act to consolidate the Nuclear Installations Acts 1959 and 1965.
- Citation: 1965 c. 57
- Territorial extent: United Kingdom

Dates
- Royal assent: 5 August 1965
- Commencement: various (Note: Section 30(2).)
Other legislation
Amends	See § Repealed enactments
Repeals/revokes	See § Repealed enactments
Amended by	Nuclear Installations Act 1969; Atomic Energy Authority Act 1971; Carriage of Goods by Sea Act 1971; Northern Ireland Constitution Act 1973; Statute Law (Repeals) Act 1974; Nuclear Installations Act 1965 etc. (Repeals and Modifications) Regulations 1974; Atomic Energy Authority (Special Constables) Act 1976; Congenital Disabilities (Civil Liability) Act 1976; Nuclear Safeguards and Electricity (Finance) Act 1978; Merchant Shipping Act 1979; Energy Act 1983; Ministry of Defence Police Act 1987; Motor Vehicles (Compulsory Insurance) Regulations 1987; Official Secrets Act 1989; Atomic Energy Act 1989; Nuclear Installations Act 1965 (Repeal and Modifications) Regulations 1990; Scotland Act 1998 (Consequential Modifications) (No.2) Order 1999; Nuclear Safeguards Act 2000; Anti-terrorism, Crime and Security Act 2001; Energy Act 2004; Energy Act 2013; Nuclear Installations (Liability for Damage) Order 2016; Environmental Permitting (England and Wales) Regulations 2016; Environmental Authorisations (Scotland) Regulations 2018; Sentencing Act 2020; Criminal Justice Act 2003 (Commencement No. 33) and Sentencing Act 2020 (Commencement No. 2) Regulations 2022; Energy Act 2023; Judicial Review and Courts Act 2022 (Magistrates’ Court Sentencing Powers) Regulations 2023; Infrastructure (Wales) Act 2024 (Consequential Amendments) Order 2025; Nuclear Installations (Compensation for Nuclear Damage) (Amendment) Regulations 2025

Status: Amended

Text of statute as originally enacted

Revised text of statute as amended

Text of the Nuclear Installations Act 1965 as in force today (including any amendments) within the United Kingdom, from legislation.gov.uk.

The Nuclear Installations Act 1965 (c. 57) is an act of the Parliament of the United Kingdom which enacted certain international conventions and consolidated legislation on nuclear installations made under the Nuclear Installations Acts 1959 and 1965.

== Background ==
The act was to amend the Nuclear Installations (Licensing and Insurance) Act 1959 (7 & 8 Eliz. 2. c. 46) and the Nuclear Installations (Amendment) Act 1965 (c. 6) to make them comply with international conventions on damage caused by nuclear energy accidents.

There are three relevant international conventions:

The International Atomic Energy Agency convention (Vienna, May 1963)

The Organisation for European Co-operation and Development conventions (Paris, July, 1960) and (Brussels, January 1964).

== Provisions ==
Long title: An Act to consolidate the Nuclear Installations Acts 1959 and 1965.

The act received royal assent on 5 August 1965.

The act comprises 30 sections under 7 headings:

Control of certain nuclear installations and operations

- Section 1. Restriction of certain installations to licensed sites
- Section 2. Prohibition of certain operations except under permit

Nuclear site licences

- Section 3. Grant and variation of nuclear site licences
- Section 4. Attachment of conditions to licences
- Section 5. Revocation and surrender of licences
- Section 6. Maintenance of list of licensed sites

Duty of licensee, etc., in respect of nuclear occurrences

- Section 7. Duty of licensee of licensed site
- Section 8. Duty of Authority
- Section 9. Duty of Crown in respect of certain sites
- Section 10. Duty of certain foreign operators
- Section 11. Duty of other persons causing nuclear matter to be carried

Right to compensation in respect of breach of duty

- Section 12. Right to compensation by virtue of Sections 7 to 10
- Section 13. Exclusion, extension or reduction of compensation in certain cases
- Section 14. Protection for ships and aircraft

Bringing and satisfaction of claims

- Section 15. Time for bringing claims under Sections 7 to 11
- Section 16. Satisfaction of claims by virtue of Sections 7 to 10
- Section 17. Jurisdiction, shared liability and foreign judgments

Cover for compensation

- Section 18. General cover for compensation by virtue of Sections 7 to 10
- Section 19. Special cover for licensee's liability
- Section 20. Furnishing of information relating to licensee's cover
- Section 21. Supplementary provisions with respect to cover for compensation in respect of carriage

Miscellaneous and general

- Section 22. Reporting of and inquiries into dangerous occurrences
- Section 23. Registration in connection with certain occurrences
- Section 24. Inspectors
- Section 25. Offences-general
- Section 26. Interpretation
- Section 27. Northern Ireland
- Section 28. Channel Islands, Isle of Man etc.

Repeals and savings

- Section 29. The Nuclear Installations (Licensing and Insurance) Act 1959 and others
- Section 30. Short title and commencement

Schedule: Inquiries under Section 22(5)

=== Repealed enactments ===
Section 29(1) of the act repealed 2 enactments, listed in that section.

Enactments repealed by section 29(1)
Citation	Short title	Extent of repeal
1959 c. 46	Nuclear Installations (Licensing and Insurance) Act 1959	The whole act.
1965 c. 6	Nuclear Installations (Amendment) Act 1965	The whole act except section 17(2).

== Subsequent developments ==
Section 29(1) of the act was repealed by section 1 of, and part XI of the schedule to, the Statute Law (Repeals) Act 1974, which came into force on 27 June 1974.

== See also ==
- Atomic Energy Authority Act
- Atomic Energy Research Establishment
- Atomic Weapons Research Establishment
- Nuclear weapons and the United Kingdom
