= Nuclear Industry (Finance) Act 1977 =

Act of the Parliament of the United Kingdom

Nuclear Industry (Finance) Act 1977 (Note: Section 7.)
- Act of Parliament
- Parliament of the United Kingdom
- Long title: An Act to make further financial provision for and in respect of British Nuclear Fuels Limited, The Radio-chemical Centre Limited and the National Nuclear Corporation Limited.
- Citation: 1977 c. 7
- Introduced by: Secretary of State for Energy (Mr. Anthony Wedgwood Benn); Second Reading 8 February 1977 (Commons)
- Territorial extent: United Kingdom

Dates
- Royal assent: 30 March 1977
- Commencement: 30 March 1977 (Note: The Acts of Parliament (Commencement) Act 1793.)
Other legislation
Amends	Atomic Energy Authority Act 1971
Amended by	Nuclear Industry (Finance) Act 1981; Atomic Energy Act 1989; Energy Act 2004; Deregulation Act 2015

Status: Amended

Text of statute as originally enacted

Revised text of statute as amended

Text of the Nuclear Industry (Finance) Act 1977 as in force today (including any amendments) within the United Kingdom, from legislation.gov.uk.

The Nuclear Industry (Finance) Act 1977 (c. 7) is an act of the Parliament of the United Kingdom. Its effect was to amend the financial provision for three of the United Kingdom's nuclear organisations.

== Provisions ==
Its long title is: An Act to make further financial provision for and in respect of British Nuclear Fuels Limited, The Radio-chemical Centre Limited and the National Nuclear Corporation Limited.

It received royal assent on 30 March 1977.

The act comprises four sections:

- Section 1. Government guarantee of companies' borrowing, etc.
- Section 2. Financial limits.
- Section 3. National Nuclear Corporation Limited.
- Section 4. Citation.

== Effects ==
The financial limits for British Nuclear Fuels Limited (BNFL) was £300 million, but could be increased to not exceeding £500 million The financial limits for The Radio-chemical Centre Limited (TRCL) was £5 million but could be increased to not exceeding £15 million.

The act has subsequently been amended.

== See also ==
- Atomic Energy Authority Act
- Atomic Energy Research Establishment
