= Atomic Energy Act 1946 =

Act of the Parliament of the United Kingdom

Atomic Energy Act 1946 (Note: Section 21.)
- Act of Parliament
- Parliament of the United Kingdom
- Long title: An Act to provide for the development of atomic energy and the control of such development, and for purposes connected therewith.
- Citation: 9 & 10 Geo. 6. c. 80
- Introduced by: Clement Attlee (Prime Minister) 8 October 1946 (Second Reading) (Commons)
- Territorial extent: United Kingdom (Note: Sections 19 and 20.)

Dates
- Royal assent: 6 November 1946
- Commencement: 6 November 1946 (Note: The Acts of Parliament (Commencement) Act 1793.)

Other legislation
- Amended by: Criminal Justice Act 1948; Patents and Designs Act 1949; Criminal Justice (Scotland) Act 1949; Criminal Justice Act (Northern Ireland) 1953; Atomic Energy Authority Act 1954; Northern Ireland Act 1962; Statute Law Revision Act 1963; Northern Ireland Constitution Act 1973; Statute Law (Repeals) Act 1974; Supply Powers Act 1975; Patents Act 1977; Statute Law (Repeals) Act 2004; Energy Act 2013; Deregulation Act 2015

Status: Amended

Text of statute as originally enacted

Revised text of statute as amended

Text of the Atomic Energy Act 1946 as in force today (including any amendments) within the United Kingdom, from legislation.gov.uk.

The Atomic Energy Act 1946 (9 & 10 Geo. 6. c. 80) is an act of the Parliament of the United Kingdom which vested in the Minister of Supply the power to control and promote the development of atomic energy in the UK.

== Background ==
Following the pioneering development of atomic energy, and the atomic bombings of Hiroshima and Nagasaki, it was thought expedient to vest the control of the development and production of atomic energy in the UK government. The primary concern was national security: the power of atomic energy could be used to jeopardise the safety of the state. The Act gave the government control over what was envisaged to became a wide field of industrial activity, and to protect the country from the danger of a possible hostile attack.

== Provisions ==
Long title: 'An Act to provide for the development of atomic energy and the control of such development, and for purposes connected therewith.'

The act received royal assent on 6 November 1946.

The act comprises 21 Sections under six headings plus two schedules:

General Functions of Minister of Supply

- Section 1. General duty of Minister of Supply
- Section 2. General powers of Minister
- Section 3. Grants and loans of Minister

Powers to obtain information and to inspect

- Section 4. Power to obtain information of materials, plant and processes
- Section 5. Power of entry and inspection

Power to search for and work minerals and acquire property

- Section 6. Power to do work for purpose of discovering minerals
- Section 7. Compulsory acquisition of rights to work minerals
- Section 8. Compulsory acquisition of prescribed substances, stocks of minerals and plant
- Section 9. Compulsory acquisition of rights under contract

Control of production and use of atomic energy and publication of information

- Section 10. Control of production and use of atomic energy
- Section 11. Restriction on disclosure of information relating to plant

Special provisions as to inventions

- Section 12. Special provisions as to inventions

General Provisions

- Section 13. Disclosure of information obtained under Act
- Section 14. Offences and penalties
- Section 15. Provisions as to orders
- Section 16. Expenses
- Section 17. Service of notices
- Section 18. Definitions
- Section 19. Application to Scotland
- Section 20. Application to Northern Ireland
- Section 21. Short title

Schedules

- First Schedule - Compensation for Work done in Searching for Minerals
- Second Schedule - Compulsory Acquisition of Certain Property

== See also ==
- Atomic Energy Authority Act
- Atomic Energy Research Establishment
