= Atomic Energy Act 1989 =

Act of the Parliament of the United Kingdom

Atomic Energy Act 1989 (Note: Section 7(1).)
- Act of Parliament
- Parliament of the United Kingdom
- Long title: An Act to alter the financial limit imposed by section 2(1) of the Nuclear Industry (Finance) Act 1977 in relation to British Nuclear Fuels plc; to make provision with respect to the recovery of certain expenses by the Health and Safety Executive; to amend sections 18 and 19 of the Nuclear Installations Act 1965; to make provision in connection with the Convention on Assistance in the Case of a Nuclear Accident or Radiological Emergency; and for connected purposes.
- Citation: 1989 c. 7
- Introduced by: Parliamentary Under-Secretary of State for Energy (Mr. Michael Spicer) House of Commons 22 May 1989 Third Reading (Commons)
- Territorial extent: England and Wales; Scotland; Northern Ireland; (Note: Section 7(3)–(5).)

Dates
- Royal assent: 25 May 1989
- Commencement: 1 September 1989 (Note: Section 7(4). The Atomic Energy Act 1989 (Commencement) Order 1989 (SI 1989/1317))

Other legislation
- Amends: Nuclear Installations Act 1965; Health and Safety at Work etc. Act 1974; Nuclear Industry (Finance) Act 1977; Health and Safety at Work (Northern Ireland) Order 1978
- Repeals/revokes: Nuclear Industry (Finance) Act 1981

Status: Amended

Text of statute as originally enacted

Revised text of statute as amended

Text of the Atomic Energy Act 1989 as in force today (including any amendments) within the United Kingdom, from legislation.gov.uk.

The Atomic Energy Act 1989 (c. 7) is an act of the Parliament of the United Kingdom. The act amended the financial limits of British Nuclear Fuels plc; the expenses of the Health and Safety Executive; the compensation available from public funds; and the provisions for mutual assistance in the event of a nuclear accident or emergency.

== Rationale ==
The act raised the financial limit of British Nuclear Fuels plc from £1.5 billion to £2 billion. This allowed BNF plc to progress its investment in the Thermal Oxide Reprocessing Plant (THORP). This facility had over £4 billion of advance contracts in 1989. An investment of £500 million was required to reduce radioactive discharges to virtually zero.

The act enabled the Health and Safety Executive to recover the costs associated with issuing nuclear licenses. The act amended legislation and allowed the UK to ratify the convention on assistance in the case of a nuclear accident or radiological emergency.

== Provisions ==
Long title: An Act to alter the financial limit imposed by section 2(1) of the Nuclear Industry (Finance) Act 1977 in relation to British Nuclear Fuels plc; to make provision with respect to the recovery of certain expenses by the Health and Safety Executive; to amend sections 18 and 19 of the Nuclear Installations Act 1965; to make provision in connection with the Convention on Assistance in the Case of a Nuclear Accident or Radiological Emergency; and for connected purposes.##2

The act received royal assent on 25 May 1989.

The act comprised seven sections and a schedule.

Financial limit of British Nuclear Fuels plc

- Section 1. Financial limit of British Nuclear Fuels plc.

Recovery of expenses by Health and Safety Executive

- Section 2. Recovery of expenses by Health and Safety Executive.

Amendment of sections 18 and 19 of the Nuclear Installations Act 1965

- Section 3. Nuclear installations: cover for compensation.
- Section 4. Effect of grant of new nuclear site licence to existing licensee.

Mutual Assistance Convention

- Section 5. Mutual Assistance Convention.

Supplementary

- Section 6. Consequential amendments and repeals.
- Section 7. Short title, commencement and extent.

Schedule. Provisions of Article 8 of the Mutual Assistance Convention having the force of law in the United Kingdom

== See also ==
- Atomic Energy Authority Act
- Atomic Energy Research Establishment
- Atomic Weapons Research Establishment
- Nuclear weapons and the United Kingdom
