= Energy Act 2004 =

Act of the Parliament of the United Kingdom

Energy Act 2004 (Note: Section 198(1).)
- Act of Parliament
- Parliament of the United Kingdom
- Long title: An Act to make provision for the decommissioning and cleaning up of installations and sites used for, or contaminated by, nuclear activities; to make provision relating to the civil nuclear industry; to make provision about radioactive waste; to make provision for the development, regulation and encouragement of the use of renewable energy sources; to make further provision in connection with the regulation of the gas and electricity industries; to make provision for the imposition of charges in connection with the carrying out of the Secretary of State's functions relating to energy matters; to make provision for giving effect to international agreements relating to pipelines and offshore installations; and for connected purposes.
- Citation: 2004 c. 20
- Territorial extent: England and Wales; Scotland; Northern Ireland (in part); (Note: Section 198(3)–(4))

Dates
- Royal assent: 22 July 2004
- Commencement: Various (Note: Section 198(2).)
Other legislation
Amends	Nuclear Installations Act 1965; Atomic Energy Authority Act 1971; House of Commons Disqualification Act 1975; Atomic Energy Authority (Special Constables) Act 1976; Nuclear Industry (Finance) Act 1977; Water (Scotland) Act 1980; Official Secrets Act 1989; Water Industry Act 1991; Water Resources Act 1991; Land Drainage Act 1991; Police Act 1996; Petroleum Act 1998; Terrorism Act 2000; Anti-terrorism, Crime and Security Act 2001
Amended by	Scotland Act 2016; Policing and Crime Act 2017; Wales Act 2017; Corporate Insolvency and Governance Act 2020; Sentencing Act 2020; Energy Act 2023

Status: Amended

Text of statute as originally enacted

Revised text of statute as amended

The Energy Act 2004 (Note: Section 198(1).) (c. 20) is an act of the Parliament of the United Kingdom concerned with nuclear power, renewable and sustainable energy and energy regulation. Royal assent was granted on 22 July 2004.

== Provisions ==
The act established the Civil Nuclear Constabulary. The act also established the Nuclear Decommissioning Authority.

The act contained measures to simplify regulations and to provide investor confidence in relation to marine renewable energy.

The act placed a duty on Ofgem to have regard to sustainable development.

Microgeneration was defined as the generation of electricity or heat from co-generation or renewable sources with an electrical capacity of less than 50 kW by the act.

=== Section 184 ===
Section 184 creates a scheme to reduce the cost of electricity distribution in areas with high electricity distribution costs. The AAHEDC scheme specifically covers the north of Scotland, currently the only area which receives assistance. Part of the tariff covers Shetland, and the remaining tariff covers the rest of the north of Scotland area. Tariffs for the scheme are published by 15 July each year but they take effect retrospectively from the preceding 1 April. The scheme is operated by National Grid Electricity System Operator (ESO), the national transmission system operator, a subsidiary of National Grid plc. The tariff in 2022/23 is 0.040670p per kwh.

== Part 4 ==
=== Section 198 - Short title, commencement and extent ===
The following orders have been made under this section:

- The Energy Act 2004 (Commencement No. 1) Order 2004 (SI 2004/1973 (C. 87))
- The Energy Act 2004 (Commencement No. 2) Order 2004 (SI 2004/2184 (C. 95))
- The Energy Act 2004 (Commencement No. 3) Order 2004 (SI 2004/2575 (C. 110))
- The Energy Act 2004 (Commencement No. 4) Order 2005 (SI 2005/442 (C. 20))
- The Energy Act 2004 (Commencement No. 5) Order 2005 (SI 2005/877 (C. 38))
- The Energy Act 2004 (Commencement No. 6) Order 2005 (SI 2005/2965 (C. 127))
- The Energy Act 2004 (Commencement No. 7) Order 2006 (SI 2006/1964 (C. 66))
- The Energy Act 2004 (Commencement No. 8) Order 2007 (SI 2007/1091 (C. 47)
- The Energy Act 2004 (Commencement No. 9) Order 2009 (SI 2009/1269 (C. 67))
- The Energy Act 2004 (Commencement No. 10) Order 2010 (SI 2010/1889 (C. 98))

== Sources ==
- "Energy Act 2004". Halsbury's Statutes of England and Wales. Fourth Edition. 2007 Reissue. Volume 33(2). Page 618.
- "Energy Act 2004". Current Law Statutes 2004. Sweet & Maxwell. London. W Green. Edinburgh. 2005. Volume 1. Chapter 20.
