= Atomic Energy Authority Act =

Stock short title used for UK legislation

Atomic Energy Authority Act (with its variations) is a stock short title used for legislation in the United Kingdom relating to the United Kingdom Atomic Energy Authority. The first Act was the Atomic Energy Act 1946, 9 & 10 Geo. 6. c. 80. The most recent such Act is the Atomic Energy Authority Act 1995, 1995 c. 37. The most recent United Kingdom energy law is the Great British Energy Act 2025, 2025, c. 16.

The Bill for an Act with this short title will have been known as an Atomic Energy Authority Bill during its passage through Parliament.

== List ==
- The Atomic Energy Authority Act 1995 (c. 37)
- The Atomic Energy Act 1989 (c. 7)
- The Atomic Energy Authority Act 1986 (c. 3)
- The Atomic Energy (Miscellaneous Provisions) Act 1981 (c. 48)
- The Atomic Energy Authority (Special Constables) Act 1976 (c. 23)
- The Atomic Energy Authority (Weapons Group) Act 1973 (c. 4)
- The Atomic Energy Authority Act 1971 (c. 11)
- The Atomic Energy Authority Act 1959 (8 & 9 Eliz. 2. c. 5)
- The Atomic Energy Authority Act 1954 (2 & 3 Eliz. 2. c. 32)
- The Atomic Energy Act 1946 (9 & 10 Geo. 6. c. 80)

=== Other nuclear energy legislation ===
- Nuclear Energy (Financing) Act 2022 (2022 c. 15)
- Nuclear Safeguards Act 2018 (2018 c. 15)
- Energy Act 2013 (2013 c. 32)
- Nuclear Safeguards Act 2000 (2000 c. 5)
- Nuclear Explosions (Prohibition and Inspections) Act 1998 (1998 c. 7)
- Nuclear Material (Offences) Act 1983 (1983 c. 18)
- Nuclear Safeguards and Electricity (Finance) Act 1978 (1978 c. 25)
- Nuclear Industry (Finance) Act 1977 (1977 c. 7)
- Nuclear Installations Act 1969 (repealed) (1969 c. 18)
- Nuclear Installations Act 1965 (1965 c. 57)
- Nuclear Installations (Amendment) Act 1965 (1965 c. 6)
- Nuclear Installations (Licensing and Insurance) Act 1959 (7 & 8 Eliz. 2. c. 46)

== See also ==
- List of short titles
- Energy law
