= United Kingdom Atomic Energy Authority =

UK government research organisation

- Type: Non-departmental public body
- Location: Abingdon-on-Thames
- Official language: British English
- Key people: Dennis Whyte (CEO)
- Subsidiaries: Culham Centre for Fusion Energy; RACE (Remote Applications in Challenging Environments)
- Budget: £202 million (2019/20)
- Website: www.gov.uk/government/organisations/uk-atomic-energy-authority

The United Kingdom Atomic Energy Authority is a UK government research organisation responsible for the development of fusion energy. It is an executive non-departmental public body of the Department for Energy Security and Net Zero (DESNZ).

The authority focuses on United Kingdom and European fusion energy research programmes at Culham in Oxfordshire, including the world's most powerful operating fusion device, the Joint European Torus (JET). The research aims to develop fusion power as a commercially viable, environmentally responsible energy source for the future.

A record 59 megajoules of sustained fusion energy was demonstrated by scientists and engineers working on JET in December 2021. In JET's final deuterium-tritium experiments (DTE3), high fusion power was consistently produced for 5 seconds, resulting in a ground-breaking record of 69 megajoules using a mere 0.2 milligrams of fuel. JET has now ceased operating and decommissioning has commenced.

United Kingdom Atomic Energy Authority owns the Culham Science Centre and has a stake in the Harwell Campus, and is involved in the development of both sites as locations for science and innovation-based business.

On its formation in 1954, the authority was responsible for the United Kingdom's entire nuclear programme, both civil and defence, as well as the policing of nuclear sites. It made pioneering developments in nuclear (fission) power, overseeing the development of nuclear technology and performing much scientific research. However, since the early 1970s its areas of work have been gradually reduced, with functions transferred to other government organisations as well as to the private sector.

UKAEA has also been involved in undertaking safety and reliability assessments for outside bodies, due to its long running experience in such work within the nuclear field.

== History ==
The authority was established on 19 July 1954, when the Atomic Energy Authority Act 1954 received royal assent and gave the authority the power "to produce, use and dispose of atomic energy and carry out research into any matters therewith".

The United Kingdom Atomic Energy Authority was formed from the Ministry of Supply, Department of Atomic Energy and inherited its facilities and most of its personnel on its formation.

The first chairman was Sir Edwin Plowden, with board members running the three major divisions:

- Industrial Group: Sir Christopher Hinton
- Research Group: Sir John Cockcroft
- Weapons Group: Sir William Penney

The authority inherited nearly 20,000 employees, which doubled to 41,000 by 1961. Most of the authority's early activities were related to the United Kingdom's nuclear weapons programme, and the need for plutonium, highly enriched uranium, and materials for hydrogen bombs. Between 1952 and 1958 UKAEA carried out 21 nuclear weapon tests in Australia and the Pacific.

Following the Atomic Energy Authority Act 1971, the authority was split into three, with only research activities remaining with the authority. The Radiochemical Centre Ltd took over production of medical and industrial radioisotopes and was later privatised in 1982 as Amersham plc. British Nuclear Fuels Ltd (BNFL) took over nuclear fuel and weapons material producing activities: the manufacturing plant at Springfields, the enrichment plant at Capenhurst, the spent-fuel facility at Windscale, and the dual-purpose Calder Hall and Chapelcross military plutonium producing reactors.

The Atomic Energy Authority (Weapons Group) Act 1973 transferred responsibility for management of the UK's nuclear deterrent, including the Atomic Weapons Research Establishment at Aldermaston, directly to the Ministry of Defence.

In 1982 the authority was involved in the creation of Nirex, to develop and operate radioactive waste disposal facilities in the United Kingdom.

The Atomic Energy Authority Act 1986 put the authority into trading fund mode, requiring it to act and account as though it were a commercial enterprise and become self-financing.

Atomic Energy Authority Act 1995 (Note: Section 14(1).)
- Act of Parliament
- Parliament of the United Kingdom
- Long title: An Act to make provision for the transfer of property, rights and liabilities of the United Kingdom Atomic Energy Authority to other persons; and for connected purposes.
- Citation: 1995 c. 37
- Territorial extent: United Kingdom (Note: Section 14(2).)

Dates
- Royal assent: 8 November 1995
- Commencement: 8 November 1995 (Note: Section 4(b) of the Interpretation Act 1978.)
Other legislation
Amends	House of Commons Disqualification Act 1975

Status: Amended

Text of statute as originally enacted

Revised text of statute as amended

Text of the Atomic Energy Authority Act 1995 as in force today (including any amendments) within the United Kingdom, from legislation.gov.uk.

The authority was then split again by the Atomic Energy Authority Act 1995, with the more commercial parts transferred into a public company AEA Technology, which was then floated on the London Stock Exchange in 1996. The nuclear facilities used for the UK's research and development programme, which held large decommissioning liabilities, were retained. The role of the authority became to decommission these nuclear assets and to restore the environment around the sites. From the early 1990s the authority completed more decommissioning work than anyone in Europe, and had considerable success in regenerating former nuclear sites for commercial use.

=== 21st century ===
Following the Energy Act 2004, on 1 April 2005 the UK's specialist nuclear police force, the UK Atomic Energy Authority Constabulary, was reconstituted as the Civil Nuclear Constabulary. Responsibility for the force was also removed from the authority and transferred to the Civil Nuclear Police Authority. The 2004 Act also established the Nuclear Decommissioning Authority (NDA), which on 1 April 2005 took ownership and responsibility for the liabilities relating to the cleanup of UK nuclear sites. The authority became a contractor for the NDA for the decommissioning work at Dounreay, Harwell, Windscale, Winfrith and the JET facilities at Culham.

On 1 April 2008, the Authority announced a major re-structuring to meet its decommissioning obligations with the NDA. A new wholly owned subsidiary, UKAEA Limited, was formed with established expertise from the existing company, to focus on nuclear decommissioning and environmental restoration management and consultancy in the United Kingdom and international markets.

At the same time, Dounreay Site Restoration Limited (DSRL) was formed out of the existing Authority team at Dounreay and was licensed by the Health and Safety Executive to operate the site and carry out its decommissioning under the Authority's management. DSRL became a subsidiary of United Kingdom Atomic Energy Authority Limited.

In parallel with these changes, the site at Windscale in Cumbria was transferred to Sellafield Ltd, a site licence company under contract to the NDA, following close review and scrutiny by the Health and Safety Executive and environmental and security regulators. The majority of authority employees at the site transferred to Sellafield Ltd.

On 2 February 2009, the authority announced the next stage in restructuring. Research Sites Restoration Limited (RSRL), was formed from the existing teams at Harwell in Oxfordshire and Winfrith in Dorset and licensed by the Health and Safety Executive to operate those sites. RSRL continued the decommissioning programmes for Harwell and Winfrith on behalf of the NDA. RSRL also became a subsidiary of UKAEA Limited.

In October 2009, Babcock International Group plc acquired UKAEA Limited, the nuclear clean-up subsidiary of the authority, including its subsidiary companies DSRL and RSRL.

In 2009 the Culham Centre for Fusion Energy (CCFE) was launched as the new name for the home of United Kingdom fusion research.

In 2014 UKAEA announced the creation of a new branch of research, using expertise gained from the remote handling system created for JET to form a new centre for robotics known as RACE (Remote Applications in Challenging Environments).

The Authority has continued to expand its facilities at Culham in recent years, with the opening of a Materials Research Facility in 2016 and creation of the Oxfordshire Advanced Skills apprentice training centre.

On 7 September 2023, the UK Government announced that, "In line with the preferences of the UK fusion sector, the UK has decided to pursue a domestic fusion energy strategy instead of associating to the EU’s Euratom programme."

== Current activities ==
United Kingdom Atomic Energy Authority states its mission as "To lead the delivery of sustainable fusion energy and maximise the scientific and economic benefit." Its research programmes include a number of laboratories and other facilities at the Culham site.

=== Facilities and programmes ===
==== Culham Centre for Fusion Energy (CCFE) ====
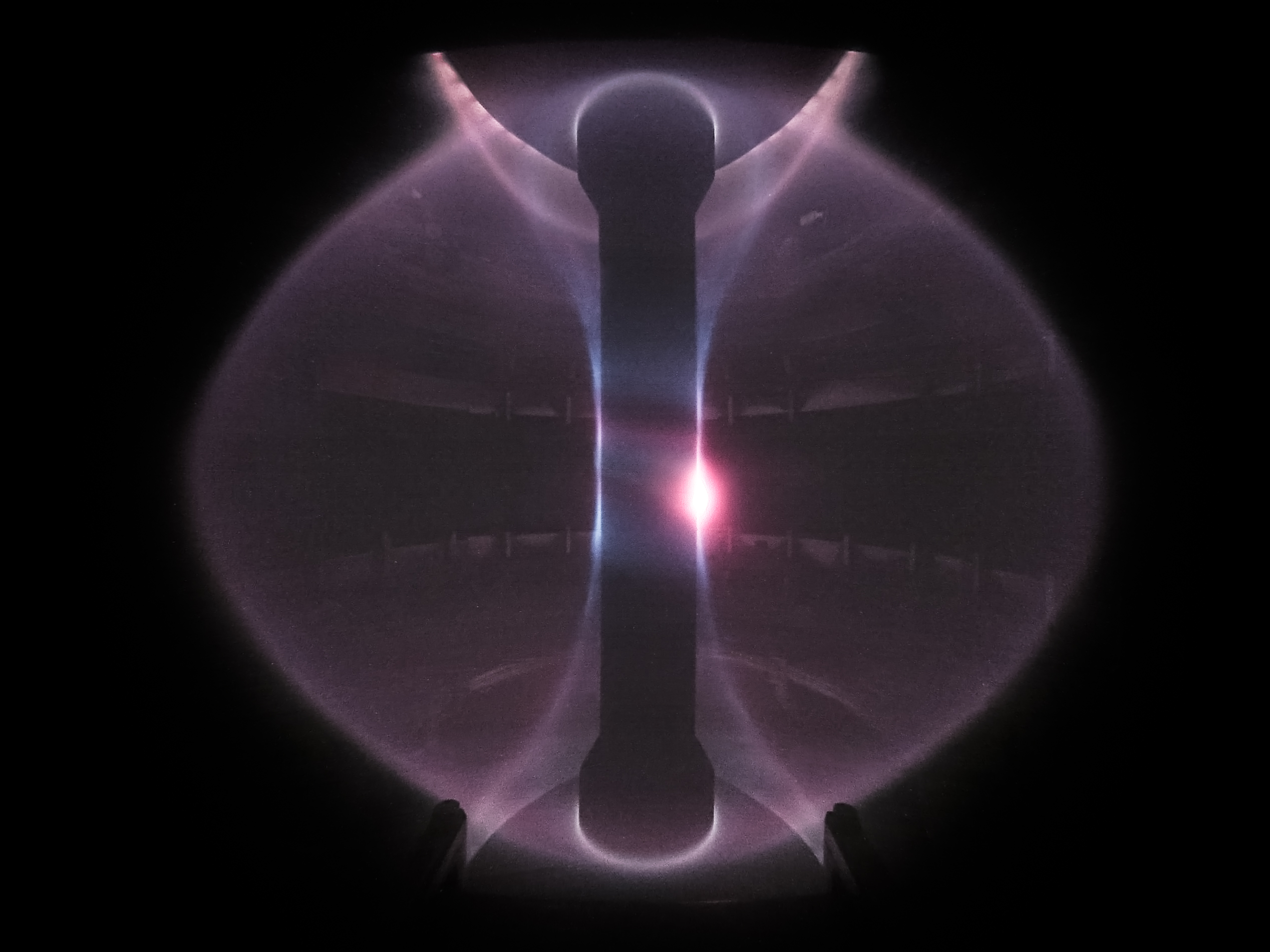
A plasma test in the MAST experiment at Culham Centre for Fusion Energy, 2013

The UK's national laboratory for fusion research, CCFE undertakes plasma theory and modelling studies to establish the physics basis for future fusion powerplants. It also studies the materials and engineering technology of tokamak fusion reactors. The centrepiece of CCFE's programme is the MAST Upgrade spherical tokamak experiment - the successor to the MAST device - which is expected to begin operation in 2019.

CCFE also operates and maintains the Joint European Torus (JET) for its research partners around Europe, and is a member of the co-ordinated R&D programme led by the EUROfusion consortium.

==== Materials Research Facility ====
UKAEA's Materials Research Facility carries out micro-characterisation of radioactive materials for researchers in both fusion energy and nuclear fission. It is open to users from academic and commercial organisations, aiming to bridge the gap between university laboratories and those at nuclear licensed sites. It is part of the National Nuclear Users' Facility and has received funding from the Henry Royce Institute. On the 14th of October 2022 the Materials Research Facility opened its extension.

==== Oxfordshire Advanced Skills ====
A partnership between United Kingdom Atomic Energy Authority and the Science & Technology Facilities Council, Oxfordshire Advanced Skills is an apprentice training centre located at Culham Science Centre. It offers training for technicians in engineering and hi-tech disciplines, with the intention of providing employers with highly skilled recruits ready to enter the workplace. Training is provided by the Manufacturing Technology Centre.

==== Remote Applications in Challenging Environments (RACE) ====
RACE is a test facility for robotics and autonomous systems. It grew out of UKAEA's remote handling operations at the JET nuclear fusion device, which date back to the 1990s. The UK Government funded the construction of the RACE centre at Culham with the intention of taking the knowledge gained at JET into other industries with 'challenging environments' where it is difficult for humans to perform work. RACE currently works with organisations in nuclear fusion and fission, with large physics facilities and with autonomous vehicle developers.

==== Spherical Tokamak for Energy Production (STEP) ====
The £220 million STEP programme aims to accelerate the delivery of fusion power to the energy market. STEP will be a prototype powerplant capable of demonstrating fusion as a viable technology for electricity generation. It uses the compact 'spherical tokamak' concept developed by UKAEA at Culham Centre for Fusion Energy. STEP is currently in a five-year conceptual design phase and is expected to be constructed and operational by 2040.

== H3AT and FTF ==
In December 2017, UKAEA announced plans for two further fusion research centres: Hydrogen-3 Advanced Technology (H3AT) and Fusion Technology Facilities. H3AT, located at Culham, will study the processing and storage of tritium, one of the two fuels expected to supply commercial fusion reactors. The Fusion Technology Facilities, based at both Culham and at a new UKAEA Yorkshire site in Rotherham, South Yorkshire, carries out thermal, mechanical, hydraulic and electromagnetic tests on prototype components to replicate the conditions experienced inside fusion reactors.

== Coat of arms ==
Coat of arms of United Kingdom Atomic Energy Authority
Adopted 12 April 1955 Crest On a wreath argent and sable, A sun in splendour of thirty-two points Or charged with a voided escutcheon gules, therein a martlet sable Escutcheon Sable semee of plates, a pile barry dancetty Or and gules Supporters On either side a pantheon gules, unguled Or, semee of mullets, thirteen of six points, two of seven, and gorged with a crown palisado, affixed thereto and reflexed over the back a chain gold

== Locations ==
Authority site locations:

- Culham Science Centre, Culham, Oxfordshire
- Harwell Science and Innovation Campus, Oxfordshire
- Advanced Manufacturing Park, Rotherham

Historical site locations:

- Atomic Weapons Establishment, Aldermaston, Berkshire
- Capenhurst (near Chester)
- Chapelcross nuclear power station, Chapelcross (near Annan, Dumfries and Galloway)
- Culcheth (near Warrington)
- Daresbury Laboratory, Daresbury (near Warrington)
- Dounreay, Caithness
- Windscale (now part of Sellafield)
- Risley (near Warrington)
- Springfields (near Preston)
- Winfrith, Dorset

== See also ==
- Atomic Energy Authority Act
- Atomic Energy Research Establishment
- Atomic Weapons Research Establishment
- Nuclear weapons and the United Kingdom
- BNFL
- John Dolphin
- Nuclear Decommissioning Authority
- Nuclear power in the United Kingdom
- UK Atomic Energy Authority Constabulary
- Campaign for Nuclear Disarmament
- United States Atomic Energy Commission
