= Energy policy of the United Kingdom =

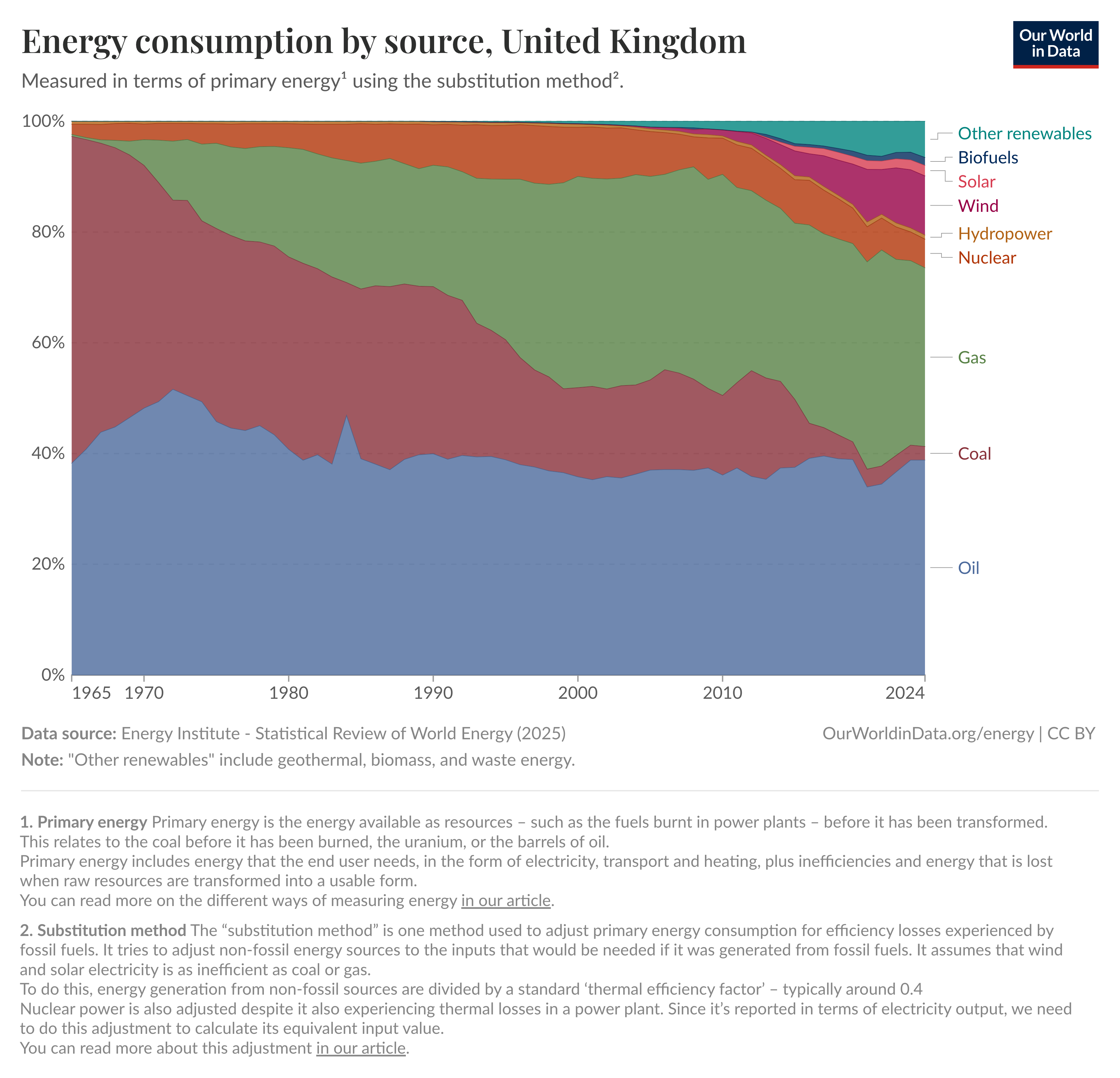
Change in primary energy mix between 1965 and 2024 in the United Kingdom

The energy policy of the United Kingdom refers to the United Kingdom's efforts towards reducing energy intensity, reducing energy poverty, and maintaining energy supply reliability. The United Kingdom has had success in this, though energy intensity remains high. There is an ambitious goal to reduce carbon dioxide emissions in future years, but it is unclear whether the programmes in place are sufficient to achieve this objective. Regarding energy self-sufficiency, UK policy does not address this issue, other than to concede historic energy security is currently ceasing to exist (due to the decline of North Sea oil production).

The United Kingdom historically has a good policy record of encouraging public transport links with cities, despite encountering problems with high speed trains, which have the potential to reduce dramatically domestic and short-haul European flights. The policy also encourages the uptake of electric vehicles, options which represent viable means to moderate rising transport fossil fuel consumption. Regarding renewable energy, the United Kingdom has goals for wind and tidal energy. The 2007 White Paper on Energy set a target that 20% of the UK's energy must come from renewable sources by 2020.

The current energy policy of the United Kingdom is the responsibility of the Department for Energy Security and Net Zero (DESNZ), after the Department for Business, Energy and Industrial Strategy was split into the Department for Business and Trade and the Department for Science, Innovation and Technology in 2023. Energy markets are regulated by the Office of Gas and Electricity Markets (Ofgem).

Areas of focus for energy policy by the UK government have changed since the Electricity Act 1989 and the Gas Act 1986 privatised these utilities. The policy focuses of successive UK governments since the full liberalisation of gas and electricity markets in 1998 and 1999 have included managing energy prices, decarbonisation, the rollout of smart meters, and improving the energy efficiency of the country's building stock.

== Overview ==
The 2007 white paper: "Meeting the Energy Challenge" set out the government's international and domestic energy strategy to address the long term energy challenges faced by the UK, and to deliver four policy goals:

1. To put the UK on a path to cut carbon dioxide emissions 60% by 2050, with real progress by 2020;
2. To maintain reliable energy supplies;
3. To promote competitive markets in the UK and beyond, helping to raise the rate of sustainable economic growth and to improve productivity; and
4. To ensure that every home is adequately and affordably heated.

The scope of energy policy includes the production and distribution of electricity, transport fuel usage, and means of heating (significantly Natural Gas). The policy states: "Energy is essential in almost every aspect of our lives and for the success of our economy. We face two long-term energy challenges:

- Tackling climate change by reducing carbon dioxide emissions both within the UK and abroad; and
- Ensuring secure, clean and affordable energy as we become increasingly dependent on imported fuel."

The policy also recognises that the UK will need around 30–35 GW of new electricity generation capacity over the next two decades as many current coal and nuclear power stations, built in the 1960s and 1970s, reach the end of their lives and are set to close.

The 2006 Energy Review reintroduced the prospect of new nuclear power stations in the UK. Following a judicial review requested by Greenpeace, on 15 February 2007 elements of the 2006 Energy Review were ruled 'seriously flawed', and 'not merely inadequate but also misleading'. As a result, plans to build a new generation of nuclear power stations were ruled illegal at that time. (See Nuclear power in the United Kingdom for details). In response, the government ran "The Future of Nuclear Power" consultation from May to October 2007. The Government's response to the consultation conclusions, published in January 2008, state "set against the challenges of climate change and security of supply, the evidence in support of new nuclear power stations is compelling."

The January 2008 Energy Bill updated the legislative framework in the UK to reflect government policy towards the energy market and the challenges faced on climate change and security of supply. Key elements of the bill addressed nuclear, carbon capture and storage, renewables, and offshore gas and oil. A framework to encourage investment in nuclear power within a new regulatory environment was simultaneously published in the January 2008 nuclear white paper.

In October 2008, the government created the Department of Energy and Climate Change to bring together energy policy (previously with the Department for Business, Enterprise and Regulatory Reform), and climate change mitigation policy (previously with the Department for Environment, Food and Rural Affairs).

=== Scotland ===
Though energy policy is an area reserved to the UK government under the Scotland Act 1998 that established devolved government for Scotland, the Scottish Government has an energy policy for Scotland at variance with UK policy, and has planning powers to enable it to put some aspects of its policy priorities into effect.

== Net Zero strategy since 2021 ==
In 2021, the UK government published its strategy to reduce the country's carbon dioxide emissions to net zero by 2050 compared to the 1990 baseline. The strategy set out a path for sectors and industry in the UK to reach net zero, addressing power, fuel supply and hydrogen, industry, transport, heat and buildings, and reduction of greenhouse gas emissions. The document was an update to the 2008 Climate Change Act.

Published in December 2024, the Clean Power 2030 Action Plan outlines the newly elected Labour party's approach through creating new energy infrastructure, changing the planning system, and reforming energy markets. Great British Energy, a publicly owned energy company, was formally established in May 2025; the new body would co-invest in clean energy projects and improve Britain's energy independence. In September 2025, the Secretary of State published the Statement of Strategic Priorities, where GBE's core objectives were laid out. These include developing clean energy projects, exapnding public ownership of those projects, and facilitating high-quality employment.

The National Energy System Operator, launched in October 2024, replaced the Electricity System Operator. It is the United Kingdom's state-owned electricity and gas system planner and operator. It is meant to make whole-system planning more coordinated, while being independent from both government and the energy industry.

The UK government revised the National Planning Policy Framework in July and December in 2024, as it relates to onshore wind. The changes mean local councils are no longer required to demonstrate that all community concerns have been addressed, so now a single objection cannot block a new onshore wind project. The revised policy also considers wind projects to be appropriate anywhere, removing the necessity for local councils to allocate specific areas for projects. These changes were implemented to compress project timelines and ultimately contribute to the Clean Power 2030 Action Plan.

== Energy markets ==
A Research and Markets review estimated the 2006 total market value of UK inland energy consumption was £130.73bn. Consumption by the energy sector was valued at £28.73bn, while the value of consumption by the non-energy sector was £128.2bn, with transport being the largest component of the non-energy sector. The UK is currently proposing wide-ranging reforms of its electricity market, including measures such as contracts for difference for generators and a capacity market to ensure security of supply in the latter half of this decade.

== Primary energy sources of electricity supply ==
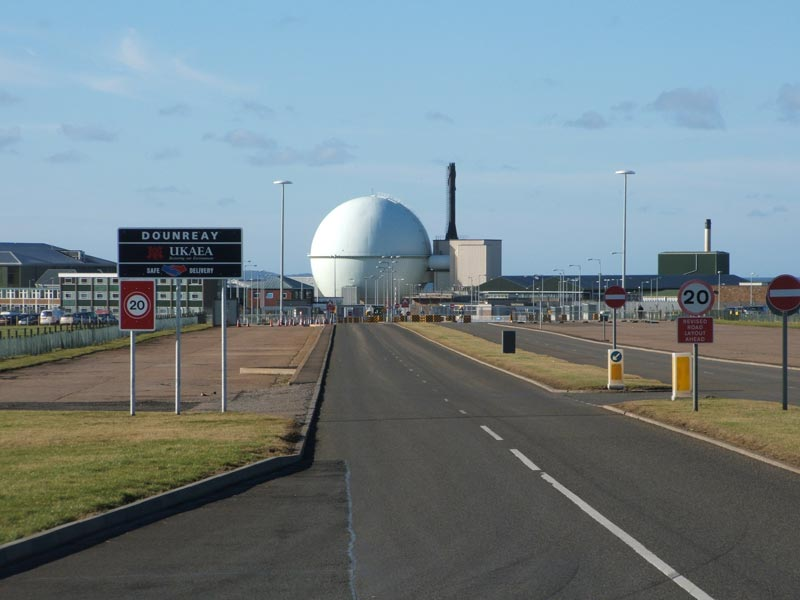
Decommissioned Dounreay nuclear power complex

The UK's electricity demand stabilised in 2017, with consumption reaching 307.9 terawatt-hours (TWh), marking a 12% decrease from 2007. Consumption was evenly distributed among the residential, commercial, and industrial sectors, with each accounting for roughly one-third. The industrial sector experienced a significant reduction of 18% in consumption, dropping from 113 TWh in 2007 to 93 TWh in 2017. Meanwhile, residential sector consumption decreased by 14%, influenced by higher prices and the adoption of energy-efficient appliances, whereas the commercial sector saw a more modest decline of 4%.

In 2024, the percentage of electricity supply derived from primary energy sources was as follows:

- Natural gas: 25.9%
- Wind: 29.3%
- Solar: 5.0%
- Hydro: 1.3%
- Nuclear: 13.7%
- Biomass: 6.7%
- Coal: 0.6%
- Oil: 0.5%.
- Imports: 15.7%
- Other sources: 1.3%

=== Coal ===
In November 2015, it was announced by the UK Government that all coal-fired power stations would be closed by 2025.

Ironbridge ceased operations in late 2015. Then in 2016, three power stations closed at Rugeley, Ferrybridge and Longannet. Eggborough closed in 2018 and has been granted consent to convert into a gas-fired power station. Lynemouth power station was converted to run on biomass in 2018 and Uskmouth is being converted. It has been announced that Cottam will close in 2019 and Kilroot will also close imminently.

In May 2016, for the first time solar power produced more electricity than coal, producing 1.33 TWh over the month compared to 0.9 TWh from coal. On 21 April 2017, for the first time since the 19th century, the UK had a 24-hour period without any generation from coal power. As of 2018, the use of coal power is decreasing to historic lows not seen since before the Industrial Revolution. Coal supplied 5.4% of UK electricity in 2018, down from 7% in 2017, 9% in 2016, 23% in 2015 and 30% in 2014.

In September 2024, the UK's last coal-fired power station, Ratcliffe on Soar in Nottinghamshire, closed, marking the end of an era in British energy policy.

=== Gas ===
During the 1980s and early 1990s, there was a massive expansion in gas-fired generation capacity, known as the Dash for Gas. The rapidity of construction of gas-fired plants (compared to coal-fired or nuclear plants) was especially attractive due to the high interest rates of the period.

Natural gas looks set to take a smaller part in providing future UK energy needs. Domestic production from the North Sea gas fields continues to lessen. And despite investment to enhance pipelines and storage of imported natural gas (mostly from Norway) there is a reluctance to allow too great a reliance on Russia and its gas exports for energy needs.

By 2021, North Sea oil and natural gas production is predicted to slip 75 percent from 2005 levels to less than one million barrels per year. Oil and coal reserves for all of Europe are among the most tenuous in the developed world: for example, Europe's reserves to annual consumption ratio stands at 3.0, perilously low by world standards.

A new "dash for gas" was announced by energy secretary Amber Rudd in November 2015. This is required to fill the gap between the closure of all coal-fired power stations by 2025 and the delayed opening of new nuclear power stations.

=== Nuclear power ===
Following the UK Government's January 2008 decision to support the building of new nuclear power stations, EDF announced that it plans to open four new plants in the UK by 2017. It is unlikely that more nuclear power stations will be built in Scotland as the Scottish Government is opposed.

=== Renewable energy ===
From the mid-1990s renewable energy began to contribute to the electricity generated in the United Kingdom, adding to a small hydroelectricity generating capacity. Renewable energy sources provided for 6.7% of the electricity generated in the United Kingdom in 2009, rising to 11.3% in 2012.

By mid-2011, the installed capacity of wind power in the United Kingdom was over 5.7 gigawatts and the UK was ranked as the world's eighth largest producer of wind power. Wind power is expected to continue growing in the UK for the foreseeable future, RenewableUK estimates that more than 2 GW of capacity will be deployed per year for the next five years. Within the UK, wind power is the second largest source of renewable energy after biomass.

UK electricity generation from renewable energy in 2012
Source	GWh	%
Onshore wind	12,121	29.4
Offshore wind	7,463	18.1
Shoreline wave/tidal wind	4	0.0
Solar photovoltaics	1,188	2.9
Small scale hydro	653	1.6
Large scale hydro	4,631	11.2
Bioenergy	15,198	36.8
Total	41,258	100

In 2017, the UK's renewable energy contribution to the total primary energy supply (TPES) was 9.7%, closely aligning with the International Energy Agency's (IEA) average of 9.9% for the same period. Moreover, renewables accounted for 29.6% of the UK's total electricity production, surpassing the IEA's average of 24.6% for electricity generated from renewable sources.

From 2020 an expansion of grid scale battery storage has been underway, helping to cope with the variability in wind and solar power. As of May 2021, 1.3 GW of grid storage batteries was active, along with the traditional pumped storage at Dinorwig, Cruachan and Ffestiniog.

== Energy end usage ==
See main article Energy use and conservation in the United Kingdom

For 2005, the breakdown of UK energy usage by sector was approximately:

- Transport: 35%
- Space heating: 26%
- Industrial: 10%
- Water heating: 8%
- Lighting/small electrics: 6%

There is a steady increase of fuel usage driven by an increasingly affluent and mobile population, so that fuel use increased by ten percent in the decade ending 2000. This trend is expected to be mitigated by increased percentage of more efficient diesel and hybrid vehicles.

United Kingdom space and hot water heating consume a greater share of end use compared to the US and more mild southern European or tropical climates. With regard to building and planning issues affecting energy use, the UK has developed guidance documents to promote energy conservation through local councils, especially as set forth in Part L of the Building Regulations (Conservation of Fuel and power). The associated document. Part 2B, addresses commercial uses, and is generally complete as to heating issues; the guidance is lacking on lighting issues, except with guidelines for local switching of lighting controls. In particular there are no standards set forth for illumination levels, and over-illumination is one of the most significant unneeded costs of commercial energy use.

From June 2007, buildings in England and Wales have to undergo Energy Performance Certification (EPC) before they are sold or let, to meet the requirements of the European Energy Performance of Buildings Directive (Directive 2002/91/EC).

In 2017, the Total Primary Energy Supply (TPES) in the UK primarily consisted of natural gas at 38.6% and oil at 34.5%. Nuclear energy accounted for 10.4%, while coal was at 5.4%, and electricity contributed a smaller share of 0.7%. Renewables, encompassing biofuels, wind, solar, and hydro, collectively made up 10.4%. Overall, this marked a 16.7% reduction in the TPES since 2007.

== Energy market policy history ==
=== 1980s market liberalisation ===
Under the Conservatives during the 1980s and 1990s, government policy was one of market liberalisation linked to the privatisation of state-controlled energy companies and the dismantling of the Department of Energy.

As a consequence, government no longer has the ability to directly control the energy markets. Regulation is now carried out through the Office of Gas and Electricity Markets (Ofgem) in Great Britain, and the Northern Ireland Authority for Utility Regulation (NIAUR), while energy policy is largely limited to influencing the operation of the market. Such influence is exerted through taxation (such as North Sea Oil Tax), subsidy (such as the Renewables Obligation), incentives, planning controls, the underwriting of liabilities (such as those carried by the Nuclear Decommissioning Authority), grants, and funding for research.

=== 1990s to 2000s ===
The UK Government continued to make reforms throughout the 1990s in the interests of creating a competitive energy market. VAT was first applied to domestic energy in 1994.

When the Labour Government came to power in 1997, the commitment to creating a competitive energy market was maintained, with new Energy Minister John Battle MP also emphasising the government's social obligation to protect the poorest households and its environmental commitments.

The Labour Government introduced Winter Fuel Payments for people aged over 60 and, in its first major piece of energy legislation, passed the Utilities Act 2000. This legislation implemented a licensing system for energy suppliers and created the Gas and Electricity Market Authority and Ofgem as a regulator, and the Gas and Electricity Consumer Council (known as Energywatch) as a statutory body with responsibility for protecting and promoting the interests of gas and electricity consumers in Great Britain.

In 1999, the process of full liberalisation of the gas and electricity markets had been completed when all UK households were able to switch their gas or electricity supplier. Households were encouraged to save money on their gas and electricity bills by switching between different energy providers, with about a third of gas and electricity customers switching between 1998 and 2003. By the mid-2000s, the market was dominated by what became known as the Big Six energy suppliers, consisting of British Gas, EDF Energy, E.ON, Npower, Scottish Power, and SSE.

Parliament also passed the Warm Homes and Energy Conservation Act 2000, a private member's bill introduced by Conservative MP David Amess, which set out the government's Fuel Poverty Strategy – defining "fuel poverty" as any household living on a lower income in a home which cannot be kept warm at reasonable cost – with a commitment to eliminate fuel poverty by 2016.

In 2008, Ofgem launched its Energy Supply Probe as its first major investigation of competition in the electricity and gas markets since the full liberalisation of the two markets. The probe found there were a range of features in these markets that weakened competition, but found no evidence of a cartel or that retail energy price rises could not be justified by wholesale costs.

=== 2010 to 2017: Energy Act 2010 ===
In the run-up to the 2010 election, the Labour Government passed the Energy Act 2010. Among other reforms, this introduced the Warm Home Discount scheme, which came into effect in 2011, and which placed a legal obligation on larger energy suppliers to deliver support to people living in fuel poverty or in a fuel poverty risk group. This replaced a number of other schemes giving reduced tariffs to some low-income customers.

Partly in response to increasing concerns about the pricing of energy tariffs by suppliers, Ofgem followed up its Energy Supply Probe with a Retail Market Review, which it launched in November 2010. The review found that complexity in the gas and electricity markets was a barrier to consumers and competition. It found that 75% of consumers were on their supplier's standard "evergreen" tariffs (also called "Standard Variable Tariffs" or SVTs), the more expensive default option than fixed-term tariffs that would save them money over a set period of time. It also found that energy prices tended to rise in response to wholesale cost increases more quickly than they fell with decreases, and that competition was weakened by significant barriers that were preventing new suppliers from entering the market. They proposed a series of measures including changing some license conditions of suppliers, to make pricing more transparent and reduce barriers for new suppliers to compete for customers, as well as working to improve consumer trust in price comparison websites.

The Coalition Government elected in 2010 published their own white paper on energy in 2011, which focused on decarbonisation and security of supply, but which backed Ofgem's findings and proposed reforms. Advocates for further reform included the consumer group Which? and Consumer Focus (later Consumer Futures), the statutory body formerly known as Energywatch.

The government later announced its intention to force energy suppliers to offer their cheapest tariffs to consumers, and subsequently made amendments in the Energy Act 2013 to give Ofgem greater powers. In 2014, the government amended the legislative Fuel Poverty Strategy for England to target improving as many fuel poor homes as is reasonably practicable to a minimum energy efficiency rating of Band C, by the end of 2030.

On 24 September 2013, the Leader of the Labour Party and former Secretary of State for Energy, Ed Miliband, announced plans to freeze energy bills for 20 months if Labour won the next general election, saying the move would save average households £120 and businesses £1,800. The announcement was criticised by energy suppliers, and labelled "Marxist" and potentially "catastrophic" by the government, but was supported by around two-thirds of the British public.

By the end of the year, the government acknowledged that there was largescale dissatisfaction among the British public about the perception that the large energy suppliers were overcharging their customers.

After working with the Office of Fair Trading and the newly established Competition and Markets Authority (CMA), to again assess competition in the energy market, on 26 June 2014, Ofgem referred the energy market in Great Britain to the CMA for an investigation. An interim report by the CMA, published in 2015, claimed that energy suppliers were overcharging customers by as much as £1.7 billion. The CMA's findings and proposed remedies, published in 2016, included a price cap for energy customers who were on prepayment meters – but were widely criticised for not going far enough.

By March 2017, Citizens Advice, which had taken on the funding and responsibilities of Consumer Futures to advocate for energy consumers, was calling for the government to extend the prepayment meter cap to more low-income households.

=== 2018 to present: Default tariff energy price cap ===
In the run-up to the 2017 general election, Prime Minister Theresa May made a commitment that the Conservative Party manifesto would include a policy to apply price controls to energy bills. May wrote in The Sun newspaper that "the energy market is not working for ordinary working families" and that if she was re-elected she would introduce a price cap policy that would save households up to £100 each.

The Domestic Gas and Electricity (Tariff Cap) Bill 2018 had its first reading on 26 February 2018, following a period of pre-legislative scrutiny from the cross-party Business, Energy and Industrial Strategy Select Committee. The legislation completed its passage through Parliament on 18 July 2018 and received royal assent the next day as the Domestic Gas and Electricity (Tariff Cap) Act 2018 (c. 21).

In August 2022, the Labour Party and the Liberal Democrats called for the energy price cap to be "frozen" to reduce the cost of living. The Green Party announced plans to nationalise the "big 5" energy suppliers.

In September 2022, the Truss ministry announced plans to freeze the price cap under an "energy price guarantee", with the government paying the difference to suppliers. The guarantee would last for two years at an estimated cost of £60bn, and was announced as part of the mini-budget, where the Government had not sought the advice of the Office for Budget Responsibility. Four weeks later, Jeremy Hunt's reversal of most of the mini-budget measures included reducing the duration of the guarantee to six months.

The price cap policy only applies in Great Britain because electricity in Northern Ireland is separately regulated. Arrangements were made for an "equivalent" policy to the energy price guarantee to be implemented in Northern Ireland. Suppliers of gas and electricity subsequently reduced their prices.

=== 2022–23: Government support for households ===
In response to the marked increase in the default tariff cap from April 2022, on 3 February the Chancellor, Rishi Sunak, announced measures to support domestic gas and electricity customers in England, Wales and Scotland. There would be a £200 discount on energy bills, to be given in the autumn and paid back by customers in later years. In addition, from April a non-repayable £150 council tax rebate was given to households in England in tax bands A to D (estimated to be 80% of homes), and local councils received £144 million to provide discretionary funding to other residents. The devolved administrations received around £715 million so they could provide comparable support, and there was an expansion of the Warm Homes Discount scheme.

With further price rises expected in October, Sunak announced a further package on 26 May. The bills discount was doubled to £400 and changed to a non-repayable grant, instead of a loan; other "cost of living" support included a £650 payment to households on means-tested benefits, £300 to pensioner households and £150 to individuals receiving disability benefits. The £400 discount would be paid to domestic electricity customers in England, Scotland and Wales as six monthly rebates (or vouchers for non-smart prepayment meters) of £66 or £67, from October 2022 to March 2023 inclusive.

Following her appointment as Prime Minister on 6 September 2022, Liz Truss announced on 8 September 2022 that a new "Energy Price Guarantee" effective from 1 October 2022 to 30 September 2024 would pay a subsidy to energy and gas suppliers, in order to limit typical household energy costs to £2,500 per year. Comparable support would be offered to businesses, public sector organisations (under a six-month scheme running to 31 March 2023) and to households who do not pay directly for electricity or mains gas, such as those in park homes or on heat networks. The cost of this package of support was uncertain since it depended on future wholesale prices, but was estimated at over £100bn per year by the Institute for Fiscal Studies. On 17 October, cost-saving measures indicated by incoming chancellor Jeremy Hunt included limiting universal assistance to six months, ending on 1 April 2023, with support beyond then to be determined by a Treasury-led review. On 17 November 2022, Hunt announced in his autumn statement that the subsidy would be reduced from April 2023, increasing the costs for a typical household to £3,000 per year, but in his March 2023 budget the chancellor reversed this decision and kept the subsidy at the £2,500 level until the end of June.

Several economists argued that the UK’s response relied too heavily on untargeted price subsidies, which greatly inflated the fiscal cost and weakened incentives to save energy. Analysis of the Energy Price Guarantee (EPG) found that, because higher-income households tend to consume more energy, a universal unit-price cap disproportionately benefited better-off and high-use “super-consumers”, while blunting incentives for efficiency investments; alternative, more targeted designs (e.g., two-tier tariffs or means-tested support) could have delivered protection at far lower cost and with stronger conservation signals. Lack of data and analytical capacity within government may have been a driver for the choice of an inefficient design.

== Energy supply and decarbonisation policy history ==
=== Early 2000s: climate change rises up the agenda ===
In 2005, the Chancellor Gordon Brown commissioned Nicholas Stern to look into the economics of climate change. The influential Stern Report concluded that climate change was the "greatest and widest-ranging market failure ever seen".

Joining over 170 other nations, the UK committed to reduction of carbon dioxide emissions, with consequent constraints to its energy policy. The UK produced four percent of the world's greenhouse gases as of 2003, compared to 23 percent by the US and 20 percent for the rest of Europe. The long-term reduction goal for carbon emissions is 80 percent decrease by 2050. A scheme of trading for carbon emission credits has been developed in Europe that will allow some of the reduction to arise from economic transactions.

Road transport emissions reduction has been stimulated since 1999 by the banding of Vehicle Excise Duty. Bands for new vehicles are based on the results of a laboratory test, designed to calculate the theoretical potential emissions of the vehicle in grammes of CO_{2} per kilometre travelled, under ideal conditions.

Aviation fuel is not regulated under the Kyoto Protocol, so that if the UK is successful in carbon emission reduction, aviation will constitute 25 percent of UK generated greenhouse gases by 2030.

The UK government has one project in the planning stage for natural gas fed power generation with carbon capture by seawater. This facility is contemplated at Peterhead, Scotland, a relatively remote exposure to the North Sea.

Prof Kevin Anderson raised concern about the growing effect of air transport on the climate in a paper and a presentation in 2008. Anderson holds a chair in Energy and Climate Change at the School of Mechanical, Aerospace and Civil Engineering at the University of Manchester in the UK. Anderson claims that even at a reduced annual rate of increase in UK passenger air travel and with the government's targeted emissions reductions in other energy use sectors, by 2030 aviation would be causing 70% of the UK's allowable CO_{2} emissions.

=== Energy white paper, 2003 ===
The UK Government published its white paper on energy ("Our Energy Future – creating a Low Carbon Economy") in 2003, establishing a formal energy policy for the UK for the first time in 20 years. Essentially, the white paper recognised that a limitation of carbon dioxide (CO_{2} – the main gas contributing to global climate change) was going to be necessary. It committed the UK to working towards a 60% reduction in carbon dioxide emissions by 2050, and identified business opportunities in so doing: a recurrent theme throughout the document was "cleaner, smarter energy". It also claimed to be based on four pillars: the environment, energy reliability, affordable energy for the poorest and competitive markets.

The White Paper focused more on analysing the issues than in providing detailed policy responses. Some detail began to filter through in a series of follow-on documents, including an Energy Efficiency Implementation Plan (April 2004) and the DTI Microgeneration Strategy "Our Energy Challenge" (March 2006). Nonetheless, most of the policies were a continuation of business as usual, with emphasis on market-led solutions and an expectation that consumers act rationally, for example in installing energy efficiency measures to make running cost savings.

In November 2005 it was announced that the government, under DTI leadership, would undertake a full-scale energy review, and over 500 organisations and individuals made detailed submissions as part of this review. Officially, the review was to take stock of the outcomes to date of the white paper, which a particular focus on cutting carbon (emissions of which remained stubbornly high) and to look in more detail at security of supply, as the UK's oil and gas production from the North Sea had peaked, and Russia was seen as being a high-risk supplier of gas.

Unofficially, it was widely felt that the real reason behind the review was to allow nuclear power back into the energy debate, as it had been sidelined in the 2003 white paper. That document had said "This white paper does not contain specific proposals for building new nuclear power stations. However, we do not rule out the possibility that at some point in the future new nuclear build might be necessary if we are to meet our carbon targets. Before any decision to proceed with the building of new nuclear power stations, there will need to be the fullest public consultation and the publication of a further white paper setting out our proposals." The energy review was therefore to be this public consultation.

=== European Union Emissions Trading Scheme 2005 ===
The European Union Emissions Trading Scheme (EU ETS) is a cap and trade system covering the European electricity generation sector and energy intensive industries. Introduced in 2005, it provides a mechanism through which the European price of carbon can be gradually increased to take into account negative externalities, such as the social and environmental impact of emissions, which would not normally be considered.

The inability of the market to reflect the full cost of carbon is known as a market failure. The importance of accounting for the full cost of carbon in investment decisions was highlighted by the influential Stern Review of the Economics of Climate Change which found that the cost of taking action to reduce emissions now is much less than the cost to the economy if no action is taken and adaptation is required at a later date.

The EU ETS operates by setting an overall cap on emissions and allocating tradable permits to participants in the scheme. If a participant wishes to emit more than their allocation they must purchase additional permits from a participant who does not require their full allocation. The price of carbon is escalated slowly by reducing the amount of credits in circulation, gradually increasing the incentive for businesses to seek low-carbon alternatives.

Rather than forcing all participants to reduce emissions by a set amount, cap and trade systems allow individual organisations to respond in the most effective way, whether by reducing emissions or buying extra permits, thereby reducing the overall cost of achieving emissions reductions.

In practice however, whilst providing certainty over the pace and scale of EU emissions reductions, the EU ETS has failed to raise the price of carbon sufficiently to steer behaviour away from carbon-intensive practices. This failure can be attributed to the presence of a surplus amount of credits in the system, both due to the application of the principle of precedent, whereby free permits were allocated to actors whose business is completely dependent on producing emissions, and a lack of data on actual emissions when the original cap was set.

The failures identified are not failures of the cap and trade system itself, rather failures in its implementation. Emissions trading remains the Government’s preferred option for reducing emissions, an approach also supported by the Stern Review. Steps can be taken to improve the effectiveness of the EU ETS, in fact, the presence of surplus credits would start to be addressed from 2013, after which the cap will be tightened each year and the number of credits in the system reduced. However, given that the initial cap appears to have been set too high, the carbon price may remain low, and subject to volatility, for some time after this date until the cap is tightened sufficiently.

Due in part to failures in the implementation of the EU ETS and a discrepancy between EU and UK emissions reduction targets, the EU scheme is not consistent with the pace and scale of change required to meet UK decarbonisation targets. As such, the carbon price set by the EU ETS has not been certain or high enough to encourage sufficient investment in low-carbon electricity generation in the UK. The UK Government has therefore identified that additional incentives are required to ensure that progress towards meeting the UK emissions reduction targets continues to be made. Furthermore the measures should be coherent with the EU ETS so that the UK can continue operating within the scheme until an additional incentive is no longer required. The introduction of the Carbon Price Floor is intended to achieve these aims.

Setting a Carbon Price Floor will prevent the price of carbon in the UK falling below a target level by topping up the carbon price set by the EU ETS when necessary. The target level chosen by the Government must be high enough to provide a strong signal to investors that low-carbon electricity generation represents a secure, long-term investment. A secondary aim is to encourage a change in dispatch decisions for existing generation, favouring the use of less carbon-intensive generation over more traditional forms when both are available. The carbon price floor is intended to provide greater certainty on future carbon prices, protecting investors in UK low-carbon initiatives from the volatility of the EU carbon price. This has the effect of reducing the amount of risk that investors are exposed to and decreasing the cost of capital for low-carbon investment.

In setting the Carbon Floor Price, the Government must achieve a balance between encouraging investments in low-carbon generation without unfairly impacting existing generators, undermining the competitiveness of UK industry or increasing electricity prices unduly. For these reasons, the introduction of a Carbon Floor Price is insufficient on its own to deliver sufficient investment and is supplemented by a proposed change in the support mechanism for low-carbon generation to a form of feed-in tariff, discussed below.

=== Energy Review, 2006 ===
In the light of a fast-changing world energy context, increasing dependence on oil and gas imports, concerns about carbon emissions, and a need to accelerate investment in electricity infrastructure and power stations, the UK Government undertook the 2006 Energy Review. One aspect of the review dealt with development of nuclear power. Greenpeace challenged the government's process of consultation on proposals to develop nuclear power, and following a judicial review requested by Greenpeace, on 15 February 2007 the consultation process was ruled 'seriously flawed', and 'not merely inadequate but also misleading'. As a result, plans to build a new generation of nuclear power plants were delayed while the UK Government reran the consultation process in a way that complied with the court's decision.

==== Contents ====
The Energy Review Report 2006 was a broader and more balanced document than critics (in advance) had expected. It started by reiterating the government's four long-term goals for energy policy:

- To put the UK on a path to cut carbon dioxide emissions by some 60% by about 2050, with real progress by 2020;
- To maintain reliable energy supplies;
- To promote competitive markets in the UK and beyond, helping to raise the rate of sustainable economic growth and to improve productivity; and
- To ensure that every home is adequately and affordably heated.

It then identified two major long-term energy challenges:

- Tackling climate change, along with other nations, as global carbon emissions from human activity continue to grow; and
- Delivering secure, clean energy at affordable prices, as we become increasingly dependent on imports for our energy needs.

The Review took an internationalist response, stressing that the world's economies need to get on a path to being significantly less carbon-intensive, and noting rising global demand, especially from countries such as India and China. This means using less energy in products and services and changing the way energy is produced so that more of it comes from low-carbon sources. It also identified the need for a fairer distribution of energy around the world, and identified that many resources, especially of fossil fuels which are concentrated in just a few countries.

It placed its main concerns and proposals into three groups:

Saving Energy

The starting point for reducing carbon emissions is to save energy. The challenge is to secure the heat, light and energy we need in homes and businesses in a way that cuts the amount of oil, gas and electricity used and the carbon dioxide emitted. Actions proposed include:

- Increasing information, e.g. through Home Information Packs
- Raising basic standards, removing inefficient goods from the market
- Making best use of the EU Emissions Trading Scheme and Climate Change Levy
- Making the government estate carbon neutral by 2012
- Increasing the focus on energy efficient transport

Cleaner Energy

Cost-effective ways of using less energy will help move towards the carbon reduction goal. But on their own they will not provide the solution to the challenges faced: there is also a need to make the energy used cleaner. Under this head, the government considered:

- more distributed energy generation including low-carbon heat
- more use of community based systems, including CHP
- a strong commitment to carbon pricing in the UK, through improving the operation of the EU Emissions Trading Scheme
- a strengthened commitment to the Renewables Obligation
- proposals for reform of the planning regime for electricity projects
- a clear statement of our position on new nuclear build
- support for carbon capture and storage
- developing alternative fuels for transport

The Energy Security Challenge

The challenges of reducing carbon emissions and ensuring security of supply are closely linked. Security of supply requires that we have good access to available fuel supplies, the infrastructure in place to transport them to centres of demand and effective markets so that supply meets demand in the most efficient way. Many of the measures already described for tackling carbon emissions also contribute to the healthy diversity of energy sources that is necessary for meeting the energy security challenge.

There are two main security of supply challenges for the UK:

- Managing increased dependence on oil and gas imports, especially in the light of the global distribution of energy reserves and growing international demand; and
- Ensuring that the market delivers substantial and timely investment in electricity generating capacity and networks so that households and businesses have the electricity they need at affordable prices.

=== Energy white paper, 2007 ===
The 2007 energy white paper: Meeting the Energy Challenge was published on 23 May 2007. The 2007 white paper outlines the government's international and domestic strategy for responding to two main challenges:

- cutting carbon emissions to tackle global warming
- ensuring secure, clean and affordable energy as imports replace declining production from North Sea oil and gas

It seeks to do this in a way that is consistent with its four energy policy goals:

- cutting the UK's carbon dioxide emissions by some 60% by about 2050, with real progress by 2020;
- maintaining the reliability of energy supplies;
- promoting competitive markets in the UK and beyond, helping to raise the rate of sustainable economic growth and to improve productivity; and
- ensuring that every home is adequately and affordably heated.

The paper anticipates that it will be necessary to install 30–35 GW of new electricity generation capacity within 20 years to plug the energy gap resulting from increased demand and the expected closure of existing power plants. It also states that, based on existing policies, renewable energy is likely to contribute around 5% of the UK's consumption by 2020, rather than the 20% target mentioned in the 2006 Energy Review.

==== Proposed energy strategy ====
In summary, the government's proposed strategy involves six components:

- Establishing an international framework to tackle climate change, including the stabilisation of atmospheric greenhouse gas concentrations and a stronger European Union Emissions Trading Scheme
- Providing legally binding carbon targets for the whole UK economy, reducing emissions through the implementation of the Climate Change Bill.
- Making further progress in achieving fully competitive and transparent international markets, including further liberalisation of the European Union energy market.
- Encouraging more energy saving through better information, incentives and regulation
- Providing more support for low carbon technologies, including increased international and domestic public-private sector collaboration in the areas of research, development, demonstration and deployment – for example though the launch of the Energy Technologies Institute and the Environmental Transformation Fund.

To achieve the government's aims, the white paper proposes a number of practical measures, including:

===== Energy conservation =====
Businesses:

- A new mandatory cap and trade scheme for organisations consuming more than 6,000 MWh of electricity per year, to be known as the Carbon Reduction Commitment.
- The introduction of Energy Performance Certificates for business premises and Display Energy Certificates for public sector organisations.
- The extension of smart metering to most business premises within 5 years.

Homes:

- A requirement for all new homes to be zero-carbon buildings as soon as practically possible and preferably by 2016.
- Improving the energy efficiency of existing homes.
- Improving the efficiency of consumer electronics and domestic appliances, and the possible phase-out of inefficient light bulbs by around 2011.
- Increasing the Carbon Emission Reduction Target for the electricity and gas industries for 2008–2011.
- A requirement that new domestic electricity meters should have real time displays from 2008, and a commitment to upgrade existing domestic meters on request.

Transport:

- The introduction of a Low Carbon Transport Innovation Strategy
- Support for including aviation within the EU Emissions Trading Scheme

===== Energy supply =====
- The introduction of a Biomass Strategy to expand the use of biomass as an energy source.
- Measures to grow distributed electricity generation and distributed heat generation alongside the centralised system.
- A reconfirmation that, under the Renewables Obligation, renewable energy should supply 10% of electricity generation by 2010, an 'aspiration' to achieve 20% by 2020, together with the introduction of bands within the Obligation to support different renewable technologies.
- The launch in November 2007 of a competition to demonstrate commercial-scale carbon capture and storage technology
- A 'preliminary view is that it is in the public interest to give the private sector the option of investing in new nuclear power stations'. A consultation on this was launched at the same time as the White Paper.
- The introduction of the Renewable Transport Fuel Obligation in 2008–2009, with a commitment that biofuels should provide 5% of transport fuel by 2010–2011.
- Measures to support the recovery of the remaining oil and gas reserves from the North Sea.
- Removing barriers to developing new energy infrastructure and power plants through reform of planning permission processes, as detailed in the 2007 Planning White Paper: Planning for a Sustainable Future.

==== Response of the Scottish Government ====
The Scottish Government responded to the UK government paper by making clear that it was against new nuclear power stations being built in Scotland and had the power to prevent any being built. In a statement to the Scottish Parliament, Energy Minister Jim Mather stated "Members will be aware that Greenpeace, backed by the courts, have forced the UK Government to consult properly on the future role of nuclear power. We will respond and we will make clear that we do not want and do not need new nuclear power in Scotland. If an application were to be submitted for a new nuclear power station that will be for Scottish Ministers to determine. We would be obliged to look at it – but given our policy position, our generating capacity, our multiplicity of energy sources and our strong alternative strategies such an application would be unlikely to find favour with this administration."

=== Climate Change Act, 2008 ===
On 13 March 2007, a draft Climate Change Bill was published following cross-party pressure over several years, led by environmental groups. The Act puts in place a framework to achieve a mandatory 80% cut in the UK's carbon emissions by 2050 (compared to 1990 levels), with an intermediate target of between 26% and 32% by 2020. Decarbonisation of electricity generation was seen as a major part of this reduction, essential before other sectors of the economy can be successfully decarbonised. The Bill was passed into law in November 2008. With its passing the United Kingdom became the first country in the world to set such a long-range and significant carbon reduction target into law, or to create such a legally binding framework.

The Committee on Climate Change, whose powers are invested by Part 2 of the Act, was formally launched in December 2008 with Lord Adair Turner as its chair.

In April 2009 the Government set a requirement for a 34% cut in emissions by 2020, in line with the recommendations of the Committee on Climate Change, and announced that details of how this would be achieved would be published in the summer.

=== UK Low Carbon Transition Plan, 2009 ===
Published on 15 July 2009, the UK Low Carbon Transition Plan details the actions to be taken to cut carbon emissions by 34% by 2020, based on 1990 levels (of which 21% had been achieved at the time of publication). As a result, by 2020 is it envisaged that:

- Over 1.2 million people will be employed in green jobs.
- The efficiency of 7 million homes will have been upgraded, with over 1.5 million of them generating renewable energy.
- 40% of electricity will be generated from low carbon sources (renewables, nuclear power and clean coal).
- Gas imports will be 50% lower than would otherwise have been the case.
- The average new car will emit 40% less carbon compared to 2009 levels.

=== 2011 white paper ===
The Government’s proposals for electricity market reform, published in a White Paper in July 2011, included three initiatives to encourage decarbonisation of electricity generation in the UK: A Carbon Price Floor to complement the European Union Emissions Trading Scheme (EU ETS); Feed-in tariffs which will eventually replace the Renewables Obligation; and an Emissions Performance Standard to restrict future use of the most carbon-intensive forms of generation. In implementing these proposals, the Government aims to attract investment in low-carbon generation, deliver security of supply through an appropriate mix of electricity sources and ensure a minimum amount of impact on consumer bills; all this at a time when security of supply is threatened by scheduled closures of existing plants and both the demand for, and subsequently the price of, electricity is increasing. The Government published Planning Our Electric Future: A White Paper for Secure, Affordable and Low-Carbon Electricity in July 2011. The paper contained three proposals designed to encourage decarbonisation of the UK electricity sector, the rationale behind the introduction and potential impacts of a Carbon Price Floor, Feed-in tariffs and an Emissions Performance Standard are discussed in turn below.

=== Feed-in tariff ===
A Feed-in tariff (FIT) provides a fixed level of income for a low-carbon generator over a specified period of time. There are three main types: a Premium FIT offers a static payment in addition to the revenue gained by selling electricity on the market; a Fixed FIT provides a static payment designed to replace any revenue from selling in the electricity market; and a FIT with a contract for difference (CfD), where a variable payment is made to ensure that the generator receives the agreed tariff assuming they sell their electricity at market price.

A FIT with CfD is the Government’s preferred choice as it is deemed to be the most cost-effective whilst retaining an appropriate amount of exposure to market forces. The requirement to sell electricity on the market encourages operators to make efficient decisions about dispatch and maintenance given that revenues above the agreed tariff can be achieved if electricity is sold at above the average market price. Contact with the market would be completely removed under a Fixed FIT, potentially leading to sub-optimal operational decisions, and too great under a Premium FIT, over-exposing operators to future electricity price uncertainty.

It is proposed that Feed-in tariffs with Contracts for Difference (FIT CfD) will replace the current support mechanism, the Renewables Obligation (RO), in 2017 after running in parallel from 2013. The Renewables Obligation encourages the generation of electricity from renewable energy sources by awarding Renewable Obligation Certificates (ROCs) to generators. Renewables Obligation Certificates provide an additional source of income in that they can be sold to suppliers who are obligated to source an increasing amount of the electricity they provide from renewable energy sources.

The Renewables Obligation has been successful in encouraging the development of well established forms of renewable energy such as landfill gas and onshore wind but has been less successful in bringing through less well developed technologies to market competitiveness. Modelling of future deployment scenarios indicates that a significant contribution would be required from less mature technologies which lacked sufficient incentive to develop into feasible alternatives under the original Renewables Obligation scheme. The Renewables Obligation also does not apply to nuclear generation.

Further criticism of the Renewables Obligation in its original form included uncertainty over the price of a Renewables Obligation Certificate, which varies depending on demand and could reduce significantly if the amount of electricity produced from renewable energy sources approaches the obligation level. The presence of this risk acted as a perverse incentive for the market not to meet the obligation.

The Renewables Obligation has also been criticised for acting as a barrier to entry for small generators, with only large companies able to overcome the high transaction costs and high investment risks associated with the mechanism. Any reduction in risk would improve access to capital markets which is especially important for small companies who can’t finance projects from their balance sheet alone.

Reforms of the Renewables Obligation since its introduction in 2002 have aimed to address these issues. The introduction of banding in 2009 allowed the incentives for renewable energy technologies that are further from market to be increased whilst the amount of support for well established technologies could be reduced to avoid over-subsidisation. The introduction of guaranteed headroom, also in 2009, eliminated the risk of a significant drop in ROC prices by setting the obligation level to ensure that there is always sufficient demand for ROCs. Feed-in tariffs were introduced in 2010 as an alternative to the Renewables Obligation for projects of less than 5 MW with the aim of simplifying the process and removing barriers to access for smaller generators. The Renewables Obligation scheme was also extended to alleviate concerns over the finite and limited duration of subsidies.

Mitigating some of the risks associated with the support mechanism is an alternative to raising the level of support. Despite the reforms to the Renewables Obligation detailed above, some risks, such as uncertainty over future electricity prices, remained. The introduction of a feed-in tariff to support all low-carbon generation successfully addresses this risk, which should translate into a reduced cost of capital. The introduction of a feed-in tariff is therefore intended to reduce the cost of delivering low-carbon electricity supply. Feed-in tariffs may not be as efficient in the short term but provide long term stability, incentives and resources for efficiency savings allowing tariffs to be reduced in the future.

Policy uncertainty can be created due to excessive change in the support mechanism. The Government has taken steps to mitigate this risk by publishing timetables and consulting with industry on the scale and pace of reforms, conducting an impact assessment, overlapping the introduction of feed-in tariffs with the Renewables Obligation for a period of four years and pledging to continue providing support for existing schemes under the Renewables Obligation. Despite these measures, the introduction of a new incentive scheme runs the risk of triggering a hiatus in investment if investors are unsure about how the scheme will work or uncertain whether it represents a good investment.

In addition to reforming the support mechanism, the Government is simultaneously taking steps to address other barriers to deployment, such as delays caused by the planning system and availability of grid connections. The Renewable Energy Roadmap, published by the Government in 2011, identifies the main barriers to deployment and potential deployment levels for each form of renewable energy and details how these barriers will be overcome.

=== Emissions performance standard ===
The decarbonisation incentives provided by the Carbon Price Floor and Feed-In Tariffs are further supplemented by the proposed introduction of an Emissions Performance Standard (EPS) to limit the amount of carbon dioxide that new power stations can emit per kWh of electricity generated. An Emissions Performance Standard is deemed to be required in the event that the market incentives detailed above are not sufficient in themselves to steer the electricity sector away from the most carbon intensive forms of generation.

The level at which the EPS is set recognises that fossil fuel generation currently still has an important role to play in ensuring security of supply, providing stable base-load and flexibility, whilst at the same time retaining consistency with decarbonisation objectives by preventing the construction of new coal-fired power stations without carbon capture and storage technology and maintaining affordable electricity prices.

The proposed EPS only applies to electricity generation, and is set at a level to balance the delivery of decarbonisation targets against the cost of electricity. Using the argument that decarbonising electricity is key to decarbonising UK energy supplies, many commentators have criticised H.M.Government for not introducing a far more onerous 2030 electricity EPS. This argument is based on the incorrect assumption that gas cannot be decarbonised economically at large scale.

Typically methane synthesis produces around 55% CO_{2} and 45% CH_{4}. Separating these gases into two streams in order to inject Synthetic Natural Gas (SNG) into the gas grid leaves high purity, high pressure CO_{2} as a waste by-product readily available for use for CCS at near zero marginal cost of capture and compression. If 45% biogenic:55%fossil mixed fuel is used to produce SNG with CCS, zero net CO_{2} emissions are produced. This concept is called Low Carbon Gas (LCG). In USA, it is called Carbon Neutral SNG. The typical marginal abatement cost of carbon for LCG making is around 40 to 50p/tonne supercritical CO_{2}.

Gas is a storable primary energy resource, whereas electricity is an instantaneous secondary energy vector. Energy flows from the gas grid, but vice versa. 250 times more energy is stored as gas in UK than as electricity. The capital cost of gas transmission is 1/15th the cost per MWkm of electricity transmission. 5 times more energy flows through the gas grid than the electricity grid at the Winter demand peak.

Gas is typically 1/3rd the cost per unit energy of electricity. Carbon negative gas can be produced from mixed wastes, biomass and coal at large scale at a cost of around 45 to 50 p/therm, 1/6th DECC and OFGEM's projected 2030 cost per unit energy of decarbonised electricity of £100/MWh.

The technology to produce large quantities of low cost Synthetic Natural Gas (SNG) was developed jointly between HM Ministry of Fuel and Power and British Gas Corporation between 1955 and 1992, with a view to supplying the whole of UK gas demand post-2010 when it was foreseen that North Sea gas would run out. Key elements of British Gas SNG technology are currently in use at the World's largest and longest-running SNG plant with Carbon Capture and Sequestration (CCS) at Great Plains in Dakota, and are being developed at industrial scale in China under the current 2010 to 2015 Five Year Plan.

A simple modification to the British Gas SNG technology will enable carbon-negative SNG to be produced at 60 bar pressure, and high-purity supercritical CO_{2} to be produced at 150 bar pressure, at near zero net loss of energy efficiency, or additional cost. Carbon-negative SNG can be used to generate carbon-negative electricity at lower cost than incumbent fossil gas or electricity. Given that electricity and gas can both be decarbonised with equal facility, and at nearly equal low costs, there is no need to introduce an onerous EPS with a view to largely "squeezing" gas-fired electricity generation off the grid by 2030. Instead it is proposed that technology neutral equal renewables and decarbonisation targets are introduced for both low-carbon gas and electricity, with Contracts for Differences for both low-carbon gas and low-carbon electricity, the relative "strike prices" to be set by reference to the historic gas-to-electricity price ratio. This will spread cost-effective decarbonisation equally over both the gas and electricity grids, and their associated infrastructure.

The final enacted version of The Energy Act 2013 included a late amendment: Schedule 4 to Section 57 of the Act. Schedule 4 enables any gasification plant, CCS plant, and any two or more associated power plants, or any part thereof, to be considered as a single system for the determination of net anthropogenic CO_{2} emissions, and low carbon electricity generation. The Schedule is silent about what fuel may be used for gasification; how the gasification and CCS plants operate or are inter-connected, and what type of gaseous energy vector flows from the gasification and CCS plants to the two or more power plants, or any part thereof. Typically, gaseous energy vectors used for power generation are: synthesis gas (aka Syngas or town gas - a mixture of CO, CO_{2}, H_{2} and CH_{4}); Hydrogen (H_{2}), or methane (aka natural gas, synthetic natural gas or biomethane - CH_{4}).

Any of the above gas vectors could comply with the terms of Schedule 4. In reality, the only gas transmission network in the UK connecting two or more power plants is the existing UK gas grid. Provided, therefore, that methane injected into the grid has had its anthropogenic carbon emissions offset at source by the use of either biogenic fuels, CCS or a combination of both, such methane will comply with the terms of The Energy Act, and generators burning such gas to produce low carbon electricity will be eligible for support by Contracts for Differences. DECC has confirmed that such a scheme is eligible for support by CfD.

As carbon offset methane injected into the high pressure gas transmission grid will be distributed equally to all gas end users: transport, heat, industry and power generators, enhanced revenue earned by CfD supported gas-fired power stations can be used to underwrite the decarbonising of the gas grid.

=== Energy Bill, 2012–2013 ===
The Energy Bill 2012–2013 aims to close a number of coal power stations over the next two decades, to reduce dependence on fossil fuels and has financial incentives to reduce energy demand. The construction of a new generation of nuclear power stations will be facilitated, helped by the establishment of a new Office for Nuclear Regulation. Government climate change targets are to produce 30% of electricity from renewable sources by 2020, to cut greenhouse gas emissions by 50% on 1990 levels by 2025 and by 80% on 1990 levels by 2050.

=== Select Committee report, 2016 ===
The Energy and Climate Change Select Committee reported on 15 October 2016 on upcoming challenges for energy and climate policy. The committee recommended investment in energy storage on the supply side and in efficiency technologies that smooth out demand peaks, by switching devices off and on and running them at lower power during times of stress, for example.

=== Salix Finance Ltd. ===
Salix Finance Ltd. provides government funding to the public sector to improve energy efficiency, reduce carbon emissions and lower energy bills. Salix is a non-departmental public body, owned wholly by the government, and funded by the Department for Business, Energy and Industrial Strategy, the Department for Education, the Welsh Government and the Scottish Government.

=== Energy white paper, 2020 ===
The 2020 energy white paper sets a target to achieve net zero within the UK by 2050, in efforts to halt the progress of climate change. The UK government aim to do this by:

- Investing heavily in renewable energy sources with a goal of 40 GW (about 60% of the UK's energy consumption) of offshore wind by 2030
- Getting one large-scale nuclear project to its investment decision by the end of the parliamentary session
- Growing the rate at which electric heatpumps are installed
- Supporting the deployment of carbon capture and storage
- Establishing a new UK emissions system
- Debating whether to end connections to the gas grid for new homes

The government also issued the "Ten Point Plan for a Green Industrial Revolution", in which Prime Minister Boris Johnson stated it would "mobilise £12 billion of government investment, and potentially three times as much from the private sector, to create and support up to 250,000 green jobs" and "turn the UK into the world's number one centre for green technology and finance".

=== Implementing policy: government oversight ===
Government supervision of the coal, gas and electricity industries was established in the 19th century. Since then, specific departments of state and regulatory bodies have had responsibility for policy implementation, regulation and control.

=== History ===
The supply of energy in the nineteenth century – in the form of coal, gas and electricity – was largely by private companies and municipal gas and electricity undertakings. Public control of these supplies was generally in the hands of local authorities. Such control was exercised through limiting prices and dividends and by encouraging competition. State intervention was through legislation such as the Mines and Collieries Act 1842, and the Gasworks Clauses Act 1847 which restricted company dividends to ten per cent. The Electric Lighting Act 1882 established control over electricity supply industry from its earliest days. It required undertakings to obtain a license or order from the Board of Trade to generate and supply electricity. The Board of Trade and the Home Office therefore provided early oversight and control of the energy industries.

=== New government bodies ===
Between 1919 and 1941 the newly created Ministry of Transport assumed control of the electricity industry. Under wartime conditions the Ministry of Fuel and Power was established in 1942 to coordinate energy supplies. UK Government policy was enacted through a succession of ministries and departments. These are summarised in the following table.

Government ministry / department with responsibility for energy matters
Regulatory body	Established	Abolished / status	Political party	Tenure from	Tenure to	Notes
Board of Trade	–	Continued	Various	c. 1847	1942	Gas and electricity industries
Home Office	–	Continued	Various	1842	1920	Coal industry
Ministry of Transport	1919	Continued	Various	1919	1941	Electricity supply only
Board of Trade (Secretary for Mines)	1920	1942 transferred to Ministry of Fuel and Power, Board of Trade continued	Various	1920	1942	
Board of Trade (Secretary for Petroleum)	1940	1942 transferred to Ministry of Fuel and Power, Board of Trade continued	National	1940	1942	
Board of Trade	–	October 1970 became DTI	National	1941	1942	
Ministry of Fuel and Power	3 June 1942	13 January 1957 renamed Ministry of Power	National	June 1942	July 1945	
Ministry of Fuel and Power	3 June 1942	13 January 1957 renamed Ministry of Power	Labour	August 1945	October 1951	
Ministry of Fuel and Power	3 June 1942	13 January 1957 renamed Ministry of Power	Conservative	October 1951	January 1957	
Ministry of Power	13 January 1957	6 October 1969 merged with Ministry of Technology	Conservative	January 1957	October 1964	
Ministry of Power	13 January 1957	6 October 1969 merged with Ministry of Technology	Labour	October 1964	October 1969	
Ministry of Technology (MinTech)	18 October 1964	15 October 1970	Labour	October 1969	June 1970	
Ministry of Technology (MinTech)	18 October 1964	15 October 1970	Conservative	June 1970	October 1970	
Department of Trade and Industry (DTI)	15 October 1970	January 1974 transferred to DoE, DTI continued	Conservative	October 1970	January 1974	
Department of Energy	8 January 1974	11 April 1992	Conservative	January 1974	March 1974	
Department of Energy	8 January 1974	11 April 1992	Labour	March 1974	4 May 1979	
Department of Energy	8 January 1974	11 April 1992	Conservative	May 1979	April 1992	
Department of Trade and Industry	(11 April 1992)	June 2007 transferred to BERR, DTI continued	Conservative	April 1992	May 1997	
Department of Trade and Industry	(11 April 1992)	June 2007 transferred to BERR, DTI continued	Labour	May 1997	June 2007	
Department of Business, Enterprise and Regulatory Reform	28 June 2007	October 2008 transferred to DECC 2008, BERR continued	Labour	June 2007	October 2008	
Department of Energy and Climate Change	3 October 2008	14 July 2016	Labour	October 2008	May 2010	
Department of Energy and Climate Change	3 October 2008	14 July 2016	Coalition	May 2010	May 2015	
Department of Energy and Climate Change	3 October 2008	14 July 2016	Conservative	May 2015	July 2016	
Department for Business, Energy and Industrial Strategy	14 July 2016	current	Conservative	July 2016	February 2023	
Department for Energy Security and Net Zero	7 February 2023	current	Conservative	February 2023	current	

=== Other statutory bodies ===
In addition to the above ministries and departments a number of regulatory bodies have been established to regulate and supervise specific aspects of energy policy and operation. These include:

- HM Inspectorate of Mines (1842–date),
- Electricity Commissioners (1919–48) to secure regional coordination,
- Central Electricity Board (1926–48) to control supplies and construct own and operate the national grid,
- National Coal Board (1947–87), owned and managed coal mining industry,
- British Electricity Authority (1948–55) to own and operate electricity generation and transmission,
- Gas Council (1948–1973), to provide supervisory and advisory function on policy,
- Central Electricity Authority (1955–57) to own and operate electricity generation and transmission outside Scotland,
- Electricity Council (1958–1990), provide supervisory and advisory function on policy,
- Office of Electricity Regulation (Offer) (1990–2000), economic regulator independent of government,
- Office of Gas Supply (Ofgas) (1986–2000), economic regulator independent of government,
- Office of Gas and Electricity Markets (Ofgem) (2000– date), to protect the interests of consumers, where possible by promoting competition,
- Gas and Electricity Markets Authority (GEMA) (2000– date),
- Offshore Regulator for Environment and Decommissioning (OPRED),
- Oil and Gas Authority (2015–date), to regulate, influence and promote the UK oil and gas industry to maximise the economic recovery of resources.

== Fossil energy public support ==
David Cameron announced subsidies for the North Sea oil and gas industry in March 2014 resulting in the production of 3-4bn more barrels of oil "than would otherwise have been produced".

== Renewable energy targets ==
The first targets for renewable energy, 5% of by the end of 2003 and 10% by 2010 'subject to the cost to consumers being acceptable' were set by Helen Liddell in 2000.

The UK Government's goal for renewable energy production is to produce 20% of electricity in the UK by 2020. The 2002 Energy Review set a target of 10% to be in place by 2010/2011. The target was increased to 15% by 2015 and most recently the 2006 Energy Review further set a target of 20% by 2020.

Subsequently, the Low Carbon Transition Plan of 2009 made clear that by 2020 the UK would need to produce 30% of its electricity, 12% of its heat and 10% of its fuels from renewable sources.

For Scotland, the Scottish Government has a target of generating 100% of electricity from renewables by 2020. Renewables located in Scotland count towards both the Scottish target and to the overall target for the UK.

Although renewable energy sources have not played a major role in the UK historically, there is potential for significant use of tidal power and wind energy (both on-shore and off-shore) as recognised by formal UK policies, including the Energy White Paper and directives to councils in the form of PPS 22. The Renewables Obligation acts as the central mechanism for support of renewable sources of electricity in the UK, and should provide subsidies approaching one billion pounds sterling per annum by 2010. A number of other grants and smaller support mechanisms aim to support less established renewables. In addition, renewables have been exempted from the Climate Change Levy that affects all other energy sources.

The amount of renewable generation added in 2004 was 250 megawatts and 500 megawatts in 2005. There is also a program established for micro-generation (less than 50 KWe (kilowatt electrical) or 45 KWt (kilowatt thermal) from a low carbon source) as well as a solar voltaic program. By comparison both Germany and Japan have photovoltaic (solar cell) programmes much larger than the installed base in the UK. Hydroelectric energy is not a viable option for most of the UK due to terrain and lack of force of rivers.

=== Biofuels ===
The government has established a goal of five percent of the total transport fuel that must be from renewable sources (e.g. ethanol, biofuel) by 2010 under the Renewable Transport Fuel Obligation. This goal may be ambitious, without the necessary infrastructure and paucity of research on appropriate UK crops, but import from France might be a realistic option.

In 2005 British Sugar announced that it will build the UK's first ethanol biofuel production facility, using British grown sugar beet as the feed stock. The plant in Norfolk will produce 55,000 metric tonnes of ethanol annually when it is completed in the first quarter of 2007. It has been argued that even using all the UK's set-aside land to grow biofuel crops would provide less than seven per cent of the UK's present transport fuel usage.

== Fuel poverty ==
Reducing occurrence of fuel poverty (defined as households paying over ten percent of income for heating costs) is one of the four basic goals of UK energy policy. In the prior decade substantial progress has been made on this goal, but primarily due to government subsidies to low-income families rather than through fundamental change of home design or improved energy pricing. The following national programs have been specifically instrumental in such progress: Winter Fuel Payment, Child Tax Credit and Pension Credit. Some benefits have resulted from the Warm Front Scheme in England, the Central Heating Programme in Scotland and the Home Energy Efficiency Scheme in Wales. These latter programs provide economic incentives for physical improvement in insulation, etc.

== Public opinion ==
The UK is largely supportive of renewable energy and this is primarily driven by concerns about climate change and dependence on fossil fuels.

In July 2013, the UK Energy Research Centre published a national survey of public attitudes towards energy in the UK.

- 74% of participants were very or fairly concerned about climate change.
- 82% were worried about the UK becoming too dependent upon energy from other countries.
- 79% wanted to see a reduction in the use of fossil fuels over the next few decades.
- 81% expressed a desire to reduce their energy use.
- 85% supported solar energy.
- 75% supported wind energy.
- 42% had never heard of carbon capture and storage (CCS) and when given further information many expressed concern, viewing it as a "non transition" – a continuation of unsustainable practices associated with fossil fuels.
- The public was undecided on the role of nuclear power in the future energy mix. Over half (54%) said they would oppose the building of a new nuclear power station in their area.
- A majority (53%) were willing to use electric vehicles, rising to 75% if they performed as well as conventional models.

This can be compared with a similar study from the 1st Annual World Environment Review, published in June 2007, which revealed that:

- 81% are concerned about climate change.
- 79% think their government should do more to tackle global warming.
- 73% think that the UK is too dependent on fossil fuels.
- 77% think that the UK is too reliant on foreign oil.
- 87% think that a minimum 25% of electricity should be generated from renewable energy sources.
- 24% think that the Government should do more to expand nuclear power.
- 56% are concerned about nuclear power.
- 76% are concerned about carbon dioxide emissions from developing countries.
- 61% think it appropriate for developed countries to demand restrictions on carbon dioxide emissions from developing countries.

== Oil and gas ==
Oil and gas production peaked in 1999, but in 2023 licensed more oil and gas exploration was licensed.

== Analysis and criticism ==
A 2016 paper argues that current UK energy policy is a contradictory mix of free market policies and government interventions, with an undue emphasis on electricity. It concludes that the government needs to develop a clearer strategy if it is to address the three goals of economic effectiveness, environmental protection, and energy security.

In its 2022 Net zero Review the government was criticised again, with the main issue identified being a lack of consistent policy commitments and a start-stop approach to various schemes.

== See also ==
UK only

- United Kingdom National Renewable Energy Action Plan, 2009
- Campaign to Electrify Britain’s Railways
- Climate change in the United Kingdom
- Energy efficiency in British housing
- Electricity sector in the United Kingdom
- Energy switching services in the UK
- List of renewable resources produced and traded by the United Kingdom
- Merton Rule
- Timeline of the UK electricity supply industry
- UK Energy Research Centre
- UK enterprise law

UK and beyond

- Avoiding dangerous climate change
- Energy policy of the European Union
- Energy policy of the United States
- Energy Saving Trust
- Financial incentives for photovoltaics
- Low Carbon Building Programme
- National Energy Action (NEA)
- The Carbon Trust
