= Energy bill =

Energy bill might refer to:

- The United States' Energy Policy Act of 1992
- The United States' Energy Policy Act of 2005

or

- The United Kingdom's
  - Energy Act 2004
  - Energy Act 2010
  - Energy Bill 2012 - 2013
