= Nuclear Safeguards Act 2018 =

Act of the Parliament of the United Kingdom

Nuclear Safeguards Act 2018 (Note: Section 7.)
- Act of Parliament
- Parliament of the United Kingdom
- Long title: An Act to make provision about nuclear safeguards; and for connected purposes.
- Citation: 2018 c. 15
- Introduced by: Greg Clark MP, Secretary of State for Business, Energy and Industrial Strategy (Commons); Lord Henley, for and Parliamentary Under-Secretary of State of the Department for Business, Energy and Industrial Strategy (Lords)
- Territorial extent: England and Wales; Scotland; Northern Ireland; (Note: Section 5.)

Dates
- Royal assent: 26 June 2018
- Commencement: 26 June 2018 (sections 3 and 5–7); Various; (Note: Section 6.)
Other legislation
Amends	Nuclear Safeguards Act 2000; Energy Act 2013
Relates to	European Union (Withdrawal) Act 2018; Nuclear Safeguards Act 2000; Nuclear Safeguards and Electricity (Finance) Act 1978

Status: Amended

History of passage through Parliament

Text of statute as originally enacted

Revised text of statute as amended

The Nuclear Safeguards Act 2018 (c. 15) is an act of the Parliament of the United Kingdom relating to the regulation of the nuclear industry.

== Background ==
The Prime Minister gave notification on 29 March 2017 that the United Kingdom would be leaving Euratom.

== Provisions ==
The act makes legal provision to enable the continuation of nuclear safeguards after the United Kingdom's withdrawal from the European Atomic Energy Community as part the implementation of the country's exit from the European Union (Brexit).

The act received royal assent on 26 June 2018, coincidentally on the same day as the European Union (Withdrawal) Act 2018 to which it contains several references.

== See also ==
- Brexit
