= NABERS =

Australian government program for energy efficiency rating

- National Australian Built Environment Rating System

Agency overview
- Formed: 1999; 27 years ago
- Preceding agencies: Australian Building Greenhouse Rating (AGBR); Sustainable Energy Development Authority (SEDA)
- Type: Government initiative
- Jurisdiction: Australian Government
- Headquarters: 4 Parramatta Square, 12 Darcy Street, Parramatta, New South Wales 2150
- NSW Government responsible: Clare McLaughlin, Government Chair
- Parent department: Department of Climate Change, Energy, the Environment and Water (New South Wales)
- Website: www.nabers.gov.au

NABERS, the National Australian Built Environment Rating System is an Australian national initiative, managed by the Government of New South Wales' Department of Climate Change, Energy, the Environment and Water (New South Wales) on behalf of the Australian Government, that measures and compares the environmental performance of Australian buildings and tenancies.

There are NABERS rating tools for buildings across various sectors to measure greenhouse gas emissions, energy efficiency, water efficiency, waste efficiency and indoor environment quality. Some sectors include offices, hotels and apartments.

== Accredited Assessors ==
A key feature of the initiative is the use of independent 'Accredited Assessors' to conduct ratings. Assessors are required to attend training, pass an exam and complete two supervised assessments before they receive full accreditation. While there are no formal pre-requisites to attend the training, most Assessors have experience in the building services, property or energy management industries. Building owners and tenants can use the online 'self-assessment' tool, however they cannot promote these results. Only ratings that have been certified by the NABERS National Administrator can be promoted using the NABERS trademark.

== Rating System ==
NABERS rating helps you to accurately measure, understand, and communicate the environmental performance of your building while identifying areas for cost savings and future improvements. It provides a rating that is valid for twelve months from one to six stars for building efficiency across these measures:

- Energy
- Water
- Waste
- Indoor environment

Ratings can be applied to the following built environment sectors:

- Office Buildings and Tenancies
- Shopping Centres
- Apartment Buildings
- Hospitals (public)
- Hotels
- Data Centres
- Residential Aged Care
- Retirement Living
- Warehouses and Cold Stores
- Schools
- Retail Stores

The vision statement of NABERS is 'To support a more sustainable built environment through a relevant, reliable and practical measure of building performance'.

=== Offices ===
The NABERS tools attempt to provide an accurate measurement of how efficiently building owners and tenants are providing their services without penalising them for factors that are beyond their control.

For example, if the primary service that an office building owner provides is safe, lit and comfortable office space the NABERS Energy for offices tool would consider how much space is being used, how much energy is being used to supply services to the space, and then statistically adjusts for factors like the climate - which will influence how much energy is used for heating and cooling.

==== Energy ====
To obtain a NABERS Energy for offices rating, consumption data for the building (such as electricity and gas bills) is collected by Accredited Assessors along with data about a number of other aspects of the building such as its size, hours of occupation, climate location and density of occupation. Data requirements are set out in a document called 'The NABERS Energy and Water for Offices Rules for Collecting and Using Data v.3.0'. This data is then input into the NABERS rating calculator which statistically adjusts for these factors so that the building can have its consumption fairly benchmarked against its peers. The result of this calculation is a star rating on a six-star scale, where zero is very poor performance and six is market-leading.

==== Water ====
The procedure for an office water rating is similar to conducting an office energy rating. The main differences are that it is water rather than energy bills that are used, and some data such as the hours of operation are not required. Unlike office energy ratings, which can either be for the base building, tenancies or whole building, office water ratings are only available for whole buildings.

=== Data centres ===
==== Energy ====
Like NABERS for offices, NABERS Energy for data centres has three distinct rating types to reflect the different interests and responsibilities from data centres owners, operators and tenants – Infrastructure (co-location owner), Whole Facility (data centre owner) and IT Equipment (data centre tenant) ratings. The tool is designed to rate the majority of data centres in Australia, provide a direct comparison with other rateable data centres, and allow an individual data centre to measure and compare performance over time.

The NABERS Data Centre IT Equipment Rating is designed for organisations that control and manage their own IT equipment (servers, storage and networking devices). The IT Equipment rating measures features that are closely related to the primary functions of a data centre (processing, storage and networking) and that all data centres provide, regardless of how they provide them. NABERS uses two IT equipment metrics:

- Processing capacity: number of server cores × clock speed in gigahertz (GHz) and
- Storage capacity (total unformatted storage capacity in terabytes).

The NABERS performance benchmark model predicts the industry median greenhouse gas emissions for a given amount of data centre processing and storage capacity. This means that if a data centre consumes more energy than the benchmark model predicts, the site is less energy efficient than the industry median (set at 3 stars), while if it consumes less energy it is more efficient than the median. To obtain a NABERS Energy for data centres IT Equipment rating, energy consumption data for the IT equipment over a 28- to 40-day period is collected by Accredited Assessors along with data about the total unformatted storage capacity and total processing capacity as above.

The Infrastructure Rating measures the energy efficiency in delivering support services to the IT equipment, using the widely accepted industry Power Usage Effectiveness (PUE) ratio that is converted into kilogram of emissions with some modification for climate and shared cooling services. To obtain an infrastructure rating, 12 months of energy consumption data for IT equipment and infrastructure services is collected by Accredited Assessors along with the climate location of the data centre.

The Whole Facility rating measures the energy efficiency of the whole data centre by assessing the processing and storage capacity and the industry median energy efficiency for infrastructure services compared with the overall energy consumption of the data centre. It is a combination of both the IT Equipment and Infrastructure rating benchmarks To obtain a NABERS Energy for data centres Whole Facility rating, 12 months of energy consumption data for the data centre is collected by Accredited Assessors along with the processing and storage capacity and climate location of the data centre.

== Comparison to other building rating systems ==
There are a number of building environmental certification systems across the world, such as LEED, Green Star, BRE Environmental Assessment Method (BREEAM) and Display Energy Certificates (DECs). The key features of NABERS as a system are that it is based on performance rather than design, assessments are carried out by third-party 'Accredited Assessors', it is based on third party verifiable data (such as utility bills), ratings undergo government quality assurance checks and it distinguishes between the environmental impact of a building's shared services and its tenancies. While other rating systems across the world share some of these features, none share all of them.

== Adoption ==
=== Use in Australian energy programs & policy ===
While NABERS Energy is a voluntary rating scheme for buildings, its success has been at least partly driven by its extensive use in energy initiatives by government and industry throughout Australia. Some programs include:

- The NSW Government Resource Efficiency Policy (GREP): The most recent iteration of a series of NSW government procurement policies that set out NABERS targets in government leasing criteria. In the GREP, government tenants require a building to have a 4.5-star NABERS rating. It also states a 4.5-star energy rating as a minimum criterion for government data centres. Similar policies are in place other states and territories, as well as the Australian government (the 'Energy Efficiency in Government Operations' policy).
- Emissions Reduction Fund: the centrepiece of Australia's carbon abatement strategy, began operating in early 2015. NABERS Energy is used in the commercial buildings methodology, to calculate and ensure the carbon abatement achieved by project proponents is real
- Energy Savings Scheme (ESS): a New South Wales state energy program where commercial buildings can obtain Energy Saving Certificates (ESC) for energy efficiency projects, which can be sold to the market. A NABERS Energy ratings are used to demonstrate the energy savings achieved by the project.
- Green Building Fund: a former Australian Government program, where commercial buildings could obtain up to 50% of capital funding for energy efficiency projects. The program used NABERS Energy ratings to ensure the savings effectively occurred, as well as to calculate the total amount of energy and emissions saved.
- City Switch: an initiative that supports commercial office tenants to improve energy efficiency, run by a coalition of local councils throughout Australia. City Switch uses NABERS Energy as its key indicator of energy performance and provides assistance to its members to achieve a rating of 4 stars or higher

=== Use in Australian legislation ===
- The Building Energy Efficiency Disclosure Act 2010: Australian government legislation that requires owners of office buildings to disclose the energy efficiency of the building to prospective tenants or buyers. Known operationally as the Commercial Building Disclosure (CBD) program, a certified NABERS Energy rating is the main energy efficiency indicator required of building owners.

=== Use internationally ===
- NABERSNZ: The Energy Efficiency and Conservation Authority (EECA) in New Zealand licensed NABERS in 2013 to create NABERSNZ.
- The Global Real Estate Sustainability Benchmark (GRESB): The GRESB is a global standard for portfolio-level sustainability assessment in real estate. The GRESB benchmark addresses issues including corporate sustainability strategy, policies and objectives, environmental performance monitoring, and the use of high-quality voluntary rating tools such as NABERS.
- The Climate Bonds Initiative (CBI): The CBI creates Climate Bonds Standards, which provide a Fair Trade-like labelling system for bonds, designed to make it easier for investors to work out what sorts of investments genuinely contribute to addressing climate change. Data from NABERS Energy rating reports can be used in Climate Bond reporting under the Climate Bonds Standard for Low Carbon Commercial Buildings.
- NABERS IE in India: One NABERS Indoor Environment rating has been conducted in India, at the Paraharpur Business Centre. The rating was certified in May 2015.

== Program success ==
NABERS Energy for offices is considered by many to have been successful, as over 82% of the Australian national office market has now been rated with either a base building or whole building rating. Factors behind the success of the tool are largely attributed to its ability to differentiate between the base building and tenants energy end uses and strong government support. Far fewer tenancy energy ratings have been conducted however and there has also been far less uptake of the other tools.

Australian government legislation that requires owners of office buildings to disclose the energy efficiency of the building to prospective tenants or buyers. Known operationally as the Commercial Building Disclosure (CBD) program, a certified NABERS Energy rating is the main energy efficiency indicator required of building owners.
