= The Bemrose School =

Coordinates: 52°58′N 1°19′W

Location
- Uttoxeter New Road; Derby, Derbyshire, DE22 3HU; England

Information
- Type: Foundation school
- Motto: Learning together, working together, achieving together
- Established: 1930
- Local authority: Derby City Council
- Department for Education URN: 112951 Tables
- Ofsted: Reports
- Chair of Governors: David Parnham
- Head teacher: Neil Wilkinson
- Houses: Chatsworth, Haddon, Hardwick, Kedleston
- Website: https://www.bemrose.derby.sch.uk

The Bemrose School is a foundation trust all-through school located on Uttoxeter New Road, Derby, England, with an age range of pupils from 3 to 19. Opened as a boys' grammar school in 1930, it became a co-educational comprehensive school in 1975. It then became an all-through school with the addition of a primary phase in 2014.

== History ==
A new school called the Derby Municipal Secondary School for Boys was founded in Abbey Street, Derby, and opened on 12 September 1902. In December 1923, a new site for the school was acquired in Uttoxeter Road, Derby, and for some years was used for games. New school buildings designed by the architect Alexander Macpherson were built on the new site in 1928–1930 at a cost of £71,746, and when the school moved into them in 1930 it was renamed Bemrose School, in honour of the services to education of the Bemrose family of Derby, and in particular of Henry Howe Bemrose. The new school was officially opened on 11 July 1930 by Sir Charles Trevelyan, President of the Board of Education.

A memorial to the sixty-eight old boys of the former Derby Municipal Secondary School who died in the First World War was moved to the new school's main corridor where it remains to this day.

The school was originally divided into seven houses, each with its own colour and motto: Burke (Nil nisi bene), Drake (Semper audacter), Gainsborough (Vis unita fortior), Nelson, Newton (Consilio et animis), Sidney (Animo et fide), and Wellington (Pactum serva). By 1958 these seven houses had been reduced to four: Burke, Newton, Sidney and Wellington. In present times, the houses remain but they are now named after stately homes in Derbyshire – Chatsworth, Hardwick, Haddon, Kedleston.

The school became a grammar school, until in 1975 it was merged with Rykneld Boys' Secondary Modern School to make a new comprehensive school, when girls were first admitted, named Bemrose Community School. When Bemrose became a Foundation Trust school, its name was changed to The Bemrose School.

In 2015, a new building was built and a Primary Phase was opened, making Bemrose an all-through school for ages 3–19. Work began in 2017 on a £14 million three-year refurbishment and expansion program that will create places for an additional 700 pupils at the school.

== Headteachers ==
- 1930–1951: W. A. Macfarlane MA (Oxon.) (previously head of the Derby Municipal Secondary School for Boys, 1923–1930)
- 1951–1957: Eric G. Bennett MA (Cantab.)
- 1958–1971: W. Raymond C. Chapman (Innsbruck), previously head master of Firth Park Grammar School, Sheffield
- 1972–1983: W. M. Wearne MA, previously head master of the Anglo-Colombian School, Bogotá
- 1983–1993: Robert Hobson
- 1993–1997: Robert Kenney
- 1998–2000: Julian Chartres
- 2001–2003: Richard Feist
- 2004–2016: Joanne Ward
- 2016– : Neil Wilkinson (Executive Headteacher)

== Old Bemrosians ==
See also Old Bemrosians.

=== Boys' grammar school ===
- Prof F. S. Northedge (1918–85), Professor of International Relations from 1968 to 1985 at the London School of Economics (LSE)
- Tommy Powell (1925–1998), Derby County attacker 1942–1961
- Michael Knowles (born 1937), actor Dad's Army, It Ain't Half Hot Mum; co-adapter Dad's Army (radio series)
- James Bolam (born 1935), actor
- Richard Turner (artist) (1940–2013)
- John Tilley (1941–2005), Labour MP
- Stephen Marley (born 1946), novelist
- Sir Nigel Rudd (born 1947), industrialist
- Prof Joe Andrew (born 1948), Professor of Russian Literature at Keele University
- Prof John Loughhead OBE FREng (born 1948), Chief Scientific Adviser since 2014 of DECC, and President from 2007 to 2008 of the IET
- Trevor East (born 1950), presenter from 1973 to 1978 of Tiswas, Deputy Managing Director from 1995 to 2005 of Sky Sports, and Director of Sport from 2005 to 2009 of Setanta Sports
- Steve Powell (born 1955), Derby County midfielder 1971–1985
- Major General Garry Robison CB (born 1958), Commandant-General from 2006 to 2009 of the Royal Marines, and Commandant from 2004 to 2006 of the Commando Training Centre Royal Marines

== Bibliography ==
- Grimshaw, Frank, It Was Different in My Day (2002)
- Baker, Thompson and Sarfras, The History of Bemrose School 1930–2005 (2009)

== Elmtree ==
In 2010 The Bemrose School opened Elmtree, a specialist autism unit, a separate unit to ERF opened some years ago.
