= John Loughhead =

British businessman

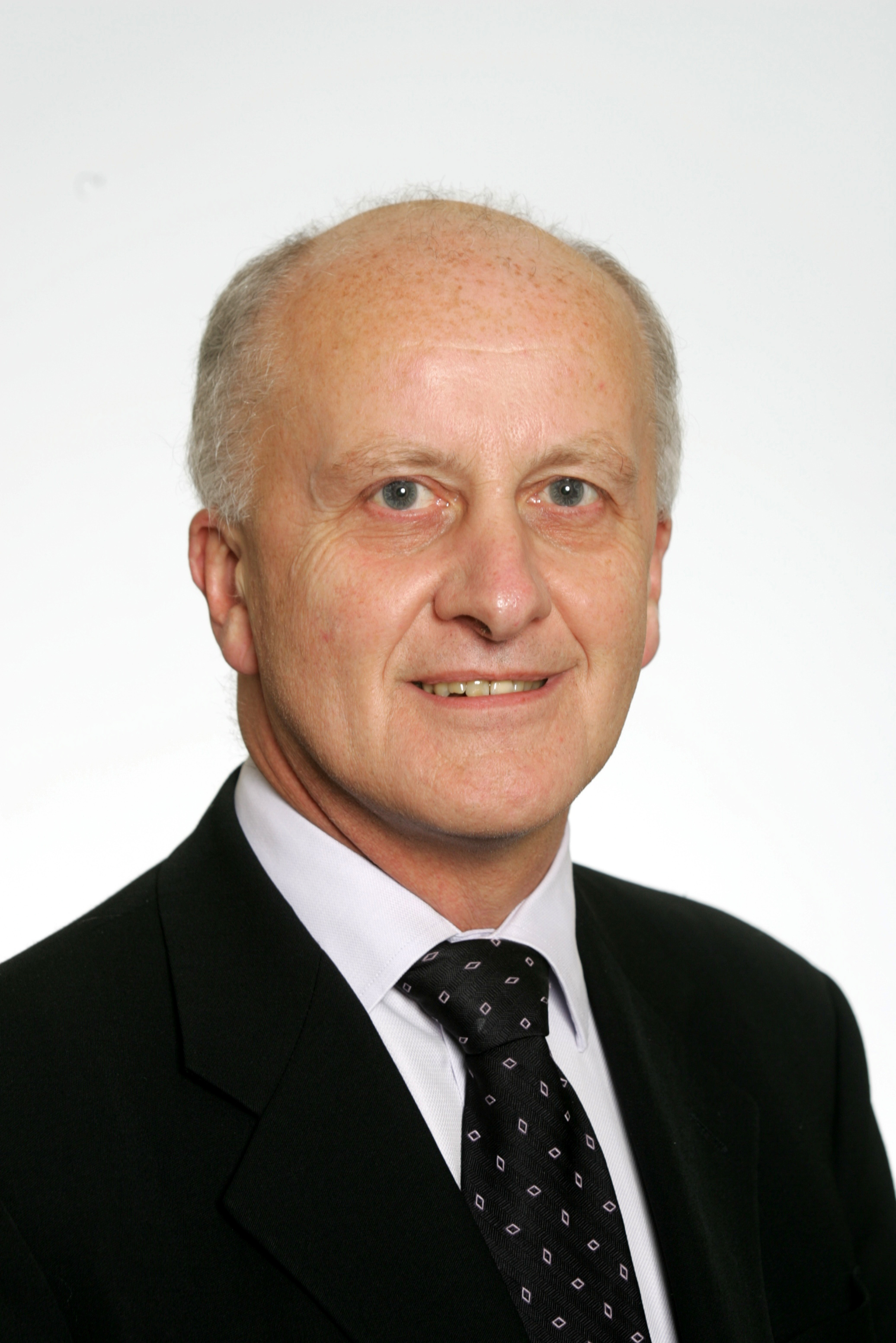
- Born: 24 of September 1948; Adelaide
- Known for: Chief Scientific Adviser at the Department for Business, Energy and Industrial Strategy (2014-2020); Executive Director of UK Energy Research Centre (2004-date)
- Website: twitter.com/JohnLoughhead1 www.ukerc.ac.uk

John Neil Loughhead (born 24 September 1948) is a British engineer and businessman. He is Industrial Professor of Clean Energy at University of Birmingham, Chair of the Redwheel-Turquoise ClimateTech Investment Committee, and Council member at the University of York. He is a Fellow of the Royal Academy of Engineering, of the Australian Academy of Technology and Engineering, and of the Chinese Academy of Engineering. He was formerly Chief Scientific Adviser to Department for Business, Energy and Industrial Strategy (BEIS) and to Department of Energy & Climate Change. He was appointed OBE for services to Technology in 2011 and CB in 2018. In 2014, he was voted as one of the Top 500 Most Influential People in Britain by Debrett's and The Sunday Times.

== Education ==
He attended Bemrose Grammar School in Derby, a boys' grammar school.

John Loughhead graduated in Mechanical Engineering from Imperial College London, where he also spent five years in computational fluid dynamics research. He is Honorary Professor of Cardiff University, Honorary Fellow of Queen Mary University of London, Fellow of the UK, Australia, and China national Academies of Engineering, and a Freeman of the City of London.

== Career ==
John Loughhead was Corporate Vice-President of Technology and Intellectual Property at Alstom. He joined the UK Energy Research Centre in 2004 as executive director. He was then the UK member of the European Energy Research Alliance, a member of the European Advisory Group on Energy, and Advisor to the European Commission Directorate-General Research, Assessor for the Technology Strategy Board, Non-Executive Director of the Ministry of Defence (United Kingdom) Research & Development Board, and a member of the UK's Energy Research Partnership. He was also Co-Chair of the Implementation Panel of the European Commission Hydrogen and Fuel Cell Technology Platform, which produced the future plan for European fuel cell commercialisation, and Co-Chair of the Implementation Committee of the International Partnership for the Hydrogen Economy. He was previously a member of EPSRC Council and Past-President of the UK's Institution of Engineering and Technology.

In 2013, John Loughhead was appointed as the UK's Focal Point contact for China in the area of energy and renewables until January 2015. Later in 2013 he was appointed chair of an independent science board overseeing a trans-European hydraulic fracturing research project.

In October 2014, John Loughhead was appointed Chief Scientific Adviser to the UK Department of Energy and Climate Change (DECC), which was merged with the Department for Business, Innovation and Skills in 2016 to become the Department for Business, Energy and Industrial Strategy (BEIS), where his responsibility was to ensure that the Department's policies and operations, and its contributions to wider Government issues, were underpinned by the best science and engineering advice available. He is presently Industrial Professor of Clean Energy at the University of Birmingham, Chair of the Redwheel-Turquoise ClimateTech Investment Committee, a member of University of York Council, and non-executive Director of Carbon Management Canada Ltd in addition to serving on a number of public and private sector advisory boards.

== Awards ==
John is a Chartered Engineer, a Fellow of the Royal Academy of Engineering, a Fellow and Past-President (2008) of the Institution of Engineering and Technology, and Fellow of the Institution of Mechanical Engineers, the City & Guilds of London Institute, and the Royal Society of Arts. He is also a Fellow of the Australian Academy of Technological Sciences & Engineering, of the Chinese Academy of Engineering, of the Chinese Society for Electrical Engineering, and Distinguished Visiting Professor at Nanjing University.

He was appointed an OBE for services to Technology in Queen's Birthday Honours List in June 2011. In January 2014, he was voted as one of the Top 500 Most Influential People in Britain by Debrett's and The Sunday Times.

He was made a Companion of the Order of the Bath for services to Research and Development in the Energy Sector in the Queen's Birthday Honours List in June 2018.

== See also ==
- Alstom
- UK Energy Research Centre
- Department of Energy and Climate Change
