= Alexander MacPherson =

British architect

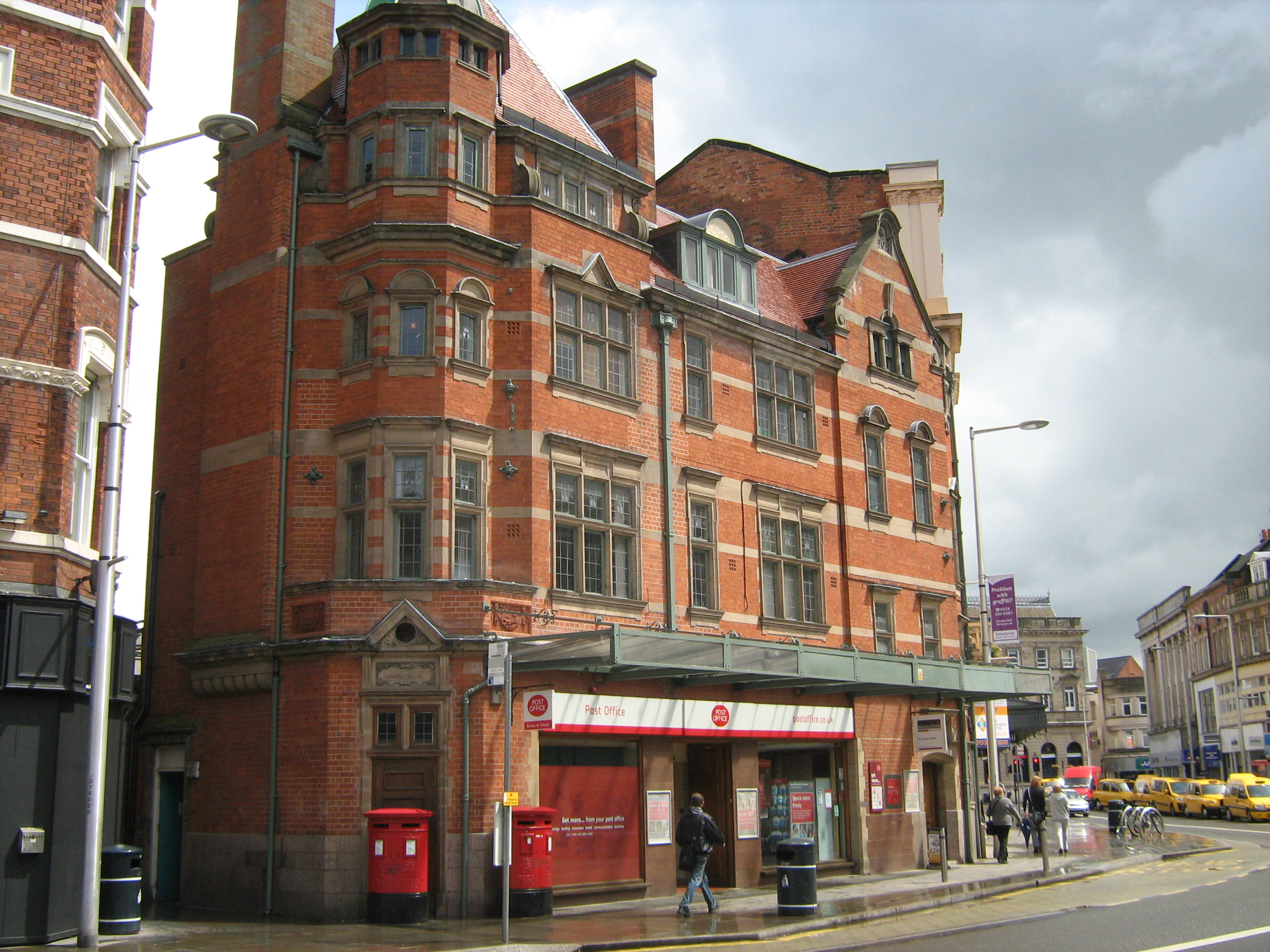
Tramway Offices, Victoria Street, Derby 1904 (now Post Office)

Alexander MacPherson (1847 – 17 December 1935) was an English architect. Although born in Nottingham he worked for the majority of his career in and around Derby, where he had moved in 1880. He served as president of the Nottinghamshire and Derbyshire Architectural Society.

== Career ==
For many years, he worked in partnership with architect W. E. Richardson. He also worked in conjunction with surveyor John Ward, who subcontracted architectural work to him, although Ward sometimes signed drawings produced by MacPherson.

MacPherson worked in a variety of styles from the baroque of department stores such as the Co-Operative Central Halls he designed in Derby and elsewhere, to the 'Queen Anne' of the now demolished Children's Hospital in Derby. He was however, perhaps happiest designing in the Tudor style made popular during the Arts and Crafts movement. Buildings such as Littleover Old Hall, Derbyshire (1898), Reginald Street Public Baths, Derby (1904), Victoria Street Tramways Office, Derby (1904), and the workers' houses he built for the Liversage Charity Estate and Haslam foundry in Derby are characteristic of this style. MacPherson's interiors were often crammed with richly carved woodwork. His rooms in Aston Hall, Aston upon Trent, and the Friary, Friargate, Derby, are good surviving examples of this style.

In later years he increasingly adopted the classical style, his work for the Walker Okeover family of Osmaston Manor, Derbyshire, being a good example of this period in his career. His last known major work, Bemrose School in Derby, is a powerful essay in the pared down classical style (1928–30), which has recently been altered.

Many of MacPherson's buildings have been destroyed. Two conservation areas within the city of Derby, Chester Green and Nottingham Road, have, however, been created to protect his buildings.

== Notable works ==
- Derbyshire Hospital for Sick Children 1882-83
- St George's Church, Derby 1890
- Stud House, Lime Avenue, Osmaston Manor, Derbyshire 1897
- Littleover Old Hall 1898
- Derby Friendly and Trade Societies’ Hall (Unity Hall), Normanton Road/Burton Road, Derby 1903 (demolished)
- Reginald Street Public Baths, Derby 1904
- New School for Weak Minded Children, Osmaston Road, Derby 1904
- Co-operative Central Warehouse, Wood Street, Derby 1904
- Victoria Street Tramways Office, Derby 1903-04 (now Post Office)
- Memorial railing at “The Boden Pleasance”, Bold Street, Derby 1910 (north east of St Werburgh’s Church - now covered by a multi-storey car park)
- T.E. Yeomans and Sons, tobacconists, St. Peter’s Street, Derby 1914
- Co-operative Society Stores, East Street/Exchange Street, Derby 1914
- Derbyshire Hospital for Sick Children, North Street, Derby 1914 (new outpatients department)
- Bemrose School, Uttoxeter New Road, Derby 1928-30
