= Nuclear Safeguards Act 2000 =

Act of the Parliament of the United Kingdom

Nuclear Safeguards Act 2000 (Note: Section 12(1).)
- Act of Parliament
- Parliament of the United Kingdom
- Long title: An Act to enable effect to be given to the protocol signed at Vienna on 22nd September 1998 additional to the agreement for the application of safeguards in the United Kingdom in connection with the Treaty on the Non-Proliferation of Nuclear Weapons; to allow effect to be given to that agreement in certain territories outside the United Kingdom; and for connected purposes.
- Citation: 2000 c. 5
- Introduced by: Second Reading 4 October 2000, the Parliamentary Under-Secretary of State for Trade and Industry, Dr. Kim Howells (Commons)
- Territorial extent: England and Wales; Scotland; Northern Ireland; Jersey (Note: The Nuclear Safeguards (Jersey) Order 2004 (SI 2004/1288).); Isle of Man (Note: The Nuclear Safeguards (Isle of Man) Order 2004 (SI 2004/1289).); Guernsey (Note: The Nuclear Safeguards (Guernsey) Order 2004 (SI 2004/1290).); (Note: Section 12(4)–(5).)

Dates
- Royal assent: 25 May 2000
- Commencement: Various (Note: Section 12(2)–(3).)
Other legislation
Amends	Atomic Energy Authority Act 1954; Nuclear Installations Act 1965; Nuclear Safeguards and Electricity (Finance) Act 1978
Amended by	Criminal Justice and Police Act 2001; Energy Act 2013; Nuclear Safeguards Act 2018; Nuclear Safeguards (EU Exit) Regulations 2019

Status: Amended

Text of statute as originally enacted

Revised text of statute as amended

The Nuclear Safeguards Act 2000 (c. 5) is an act of the Parliament of the United Kingdom concerning nuclear regulation.

== Background ==
Prior to the Gulf war Iraq had been undertaking a secret nuclear weapons programme, despite having a safeguards agreement with the International Atomic Energy Agency. It was therefore thought appropriate to strengthen the international nuclear safeguards system by allowing the agency rights of access to nuclear facilities. These new powers were enacted by the provisions of the Treaty on the Non-Proliferation of Nuclear Weapons of 22 September 1998.

== Provisions ==
The act gives the UK Government the power to provide a strengthened nuclear safeguards system in the United Kingdom. It provides an additional protocol to the nuclear safeguards agreement with the European Atomic Energy Community and the International Atomic Energy Agency. This protocol was to the 1998 Treaty on the Non-Proliferation of Nuclear Weapons.

The act comprises 12 sections:

- Section 1. Interpretation.
- Section 2. Information and records for purposes of the Additional Protocol.
- Section 3. Identifying persons who have information.
- Section 4. Powers of entry in relation to Additional Protocol information.
- Section 5. Rights of access etc. for Agency inspectors.
- Section 6. Restriction on disclosure.
- Section 7. Giving false or misleading information.
- Section 8. Power to search and obtain evidence.
- Section 9. Penalty for offences and offences by bodies corporate.
- Section 10. Service of notices.
- Section 11. Minor and consequential amendments.
- Section 12. Short title etc.

== Commencement ==
The act came into force in 2004.

== See also ==
- Atomic Energy Authority Act
- Atomic Energy Research Establishment
- Atomic Weapons Research Establishment
- Nuclear weapons and the United Kingdom
