= Energy Act 2013 =

Act of the Parliament of the United Kingdom

Energy Act 2013 (Note: Section 157.)
- Act of Parliament
- Parliament of the United Kingdom
- Long title: An Act to make provision for the setting of a decarbonisation target range and duties in relation to it; for or in connection with reforming the electricity market for purposes of encouraging low carbon electricity generation or ensuring security of supply; for the establishment and functions of the Office for Nuclear Regulation; about the government pipe-line and storage system and rights exercisable in relation to it; about the designation of a strategy and policy statement; about domestic supplies of gas and electricity; for extending categories of activities for which energy licences are required; for the making of orders requiring regulated persons to provide redress to consumers of gas or electricity; about offshore transmission of electricity during a commissioning period; for imposing fees in connection with certain costs incurred by the Secretary of State; and for connected purposes.
- Citation: 2013 c. 32
- Introduced by: Ed Davey MP, Secretary of State for Energy and Climate Change (Commons); Baroness Verma (Lords)
- Territorial extent: England and Wales; Scotland; Northern Ireland (in part); (Note: Section 155.)

Dates
- Royal assent: 18 December 2013
- Commencement: Various (Note: Section 156.)
Other legislation
Amends	Explosives Act 1875; Atomic Energy Act 1946; Nuclear Installations Act 1965; House of Commons Disqualification Act 1975; Nuclear Safeguards and Electricity (Finance) Act 1978; Civil Aviation Act 1982; Water Industry Act 1991; Water Resources Act 1991; Scotland Act 1998; Nuclear Safeguards Act 2000; Anti-terrorism, Crime and Security Act 2001; Railways Act 2005; National Health Service Act 2006; Borders, Citizenship and Immigration Act 2009
Amended by	Inquiries into Fatal Accidents and Sudden Deaths etc. (Scotland) Act 2016; Policing and Crime Act 2017; Wales Act 2017; Space Industry Act 2018; Nuclear Safeguards Act 2018; Sentencing Act 2020
Relates to	Energy Act 2010

Status: Amended

History of passage through Parliament

Text of statute as originally enacted

Revised text of statute as amended

The Energy Act 2013 (c. 32) is an act of the Parliament of the United Kingdom, relating to the energy sector. It succeeded the Energy Act 2010. The Act focuses on setting decarbonisation targets for the UK, and reforming the electricity market. The act was intended by Secretary of State for Energy and Climate Change Ed Davey to "attract investment to bring about a once-in-a-generation transformation of our electricity market".

== History ==
The Energy Bill was introduced by the government in the House of Commons for first reading on 29 November 2012, and passed a vote at third reading with cross-party support on 4 June 2013. The bill received royal assent on 18 December 2013.

== Aims ==
The Act aims to maintain a stable electricity supply as coal-fired power stations are retired. This includes facilitating the building of a new set of nuclear power stations and the establishment of a new regulator, the Office for Nuclear Regulation.

The act proposed a delay in setting decarbonisation targets under the Climate Change Act 2008, until 2016. Businesses and analysts criticised the uncertainty this caused for investors, notably Balfour Beatty and Ernst & Young. Conservative MP Tim Yeo and Labour MP Barry Gardiner tabled amendments to the Bill to reinsert a 2030 decarbonisation target for the power sector by 2014.

The act also enabled the government to privatise the Government Pipelines and Storage System.

== See also ==
- Energy policy of the United Kingdom
- Nuclear power in the United Kingdom
