= Richard Turner (artist) =

English painter

Richard Turner (29 December 1940 – 11 January 2013), also known as Turneramon, was a British artist and poet.

== Life and work ==
Richard Turner was born in Derby, England and was educated at Bemrose Grammar School, before moving to study at the School of Navigation in Warsash, Southampton. In 1958, he went on to join the Merchant Navy, as a Navigation Cadet Officer, sailing with Ellerman Lines. In 1960, he decided on a career change, and enrolled at the Derby College of Art. Turner won the J. Andrew Lloyd scholarship for Landscape, enabling him to study at the Royal College of Art in London, from 1963. There, he was tutored by Carol Weight and Sir Peter Blake. He graduated in 1966 with an Associate of the Royal College of Art Degree, as well as prizes in Life Drawing, Life Painting, and Landscape Painting.

For the next two years, Turner was a lecturer at the Guildford School of Art; working on environmental installation projects with Australian artist Tony Underhill. He was introduced to etching by Peter Olley and Norman Ackroyd. In 1968, he was employed as an epigraphic artist and photographer by the Oriental Institute of the University of Chicago. For five years, he was based at Chicago House in Luxor, Egypt; making facsimile drawings of the reliefs on the walls of the Temple of Khonsu, Karnak and Medenet Habu, adjacent to the Valley of the Queens.

In 1973, Turner returned to England, lecturing at Salisbury College of Art for three years, before being re-employed in Egypt by the University of Chicago, for a further four years. During this time he made full scale tracings of all columns in hypostyle hall of Luxor Temple. In 1980 he moved to the USA; built a split-level chalet style house in Big Bear, California, and ran his own gallery, named Minnelusa Gallery, on the shores of Big Bear Lake. He also worked as a graphic designer with Treasure Chest Advertising, based in Los Angeles.

Four years later, Turner returned to the United Kingdom, and briefly lived in Edinburgh, before moving south, to become a teacher at Vandyke Upper School in Leighton Buzzard, for five years. He returned to Scotland in 1989, and ran an "art holiday" home business from Park House in Kirkcudbright, as well as lecturing part-time in various colleges and schools. In 1993, Turner met Queen Elizabeth II and Prince Philip, at the opening of Tolbooth Art Centre in Kirkcudbright. Prince Philip commented on Turneramon's work saying it looked "refreshingly different".

== Style and influences ==
Richard Turner's work is mainly figurative painting, including some nudity, within Arcadian landscape settings similar to the compositions in renaissance and mannerist art. Turneramon's first stay in Egypt had a significant effect on his painting style and content. His change from hard edge abstraction to synthetic renaissance is evident in his 5×7 ft. painting, The Resurrection of Tutankhamen, leading to his work being labelled post modernist.

== Publications and notable works ==
- 1972 – Commissioned Mural for The Mummy Room in the British Museum, together with fellow epigraphic artist, Reg Coleman.
- 1978 – The Resurrection of Tutankhamen: Influenced by English scholar and mystic Om Seti.

=== Publications ===
- Ka Ka Ranish and the Twins of Time
- The Twins of Time and the Golden Grotto
- The Twins of Time and the Bridge of Time
- The Twins of Time and the Seven Seas of Time
- The Sacred Eyes of Time (#1 Trilogy of Nethertime)
- The Obelisk of Time (#2 Trilogy of Nethertime)
- The Twins of Time (#3 Trilogy of Nethertime)
- Arcadian Sunset (a collection of Turneramon's paintings and poetry)

== Exhibitions ==
=== Group shows ===
- 1962 "Artists of Promise", Midland Group Gallery, Nottingham, UK
- 1963 "Artists working in London", Imperial College, London, UK
- 1964 "R.C.A. Artists University College", London, UK
- 1965 "Young Contemporaries", London, UK
- 1965 Arts Council Travelling Exhibition
- 1966 "Young Contemporaries", London, UK
- 1966 Arts Council Travelling Exhibition
- 1967 "Summer Exhibition", Piccadilly Gallery, London, UK
- 1967 "Staff of Guilford School of Art", Battersea College of Technology
- 1968 "Four Painters", Reid Gallery, Guildford, UK
- 1968 Bradford Biennale
- 1968 Ashbarn Gallery, Stroud
- 1970 L’atelier Du Caire, Cairo
- 1975 "Fresh Fields and Pastures New", Young Gallery, Salisbury
- 1976 Saint Edmond's Art Centre, Salisbury
- 1977 Annely Juda Fine Art
- 1980 Files Gallery, Big Bear, CA. USA
- 1981 Bear Valley Artists' Gallery, Big Bear, CA. USA
- 1981 Calico Art's Fair, Calico Ghost Town, CA. USA
- 1982 Edward Dean Museum, Cherry Valley, CA. USA
- 1982 Patrick's Gallery, San Francisco, CA. USA
- 1982 Files Gallery, Big Bear, CA. U.S.A
- 1982 Shambles Gallery, Lake Havasu, AR. USA
- 1982 Battenberg Gallery, Big Bear, CA. USA
- 1983 Lake Arrowhead Country Club, CA. USA
- 1983 San Bernardino Country Museum, CA. USA
- 1984 Minnilusa Gallery, CA. USA
- 1986 Bedford College Touring Exhibition to Greece and Mediterranean
- 1995 High Street Gallery, Kirkcudbright, Scotland
- 2002 Beaumont Hall Studios, Buckinghamshire, UK
- 2002 Van Wedenburgh, Beverly Hills, USA (Exhibition still in place)
- 2004 "Skin Two" Barbican Centre London, UK
- 2006 War Rooms, Whitehall, London, UK

=== Solo shows ===
- 1967 Totem One Gallery, Manchester, UK
- 1970 L'Atelier Du Caire, Cairo, Egypt
- 1971 Safar Khan Gallery, Zamelek, Cairo, Egypt
- 1972 Gallery Tabac, Paris, France
- 1972 Safar Khan Gallery, Zamelek, Cairo, Egypt
- 1973 Safar Khan Gallery, Zamelek, Cairo, Egypt
- 1974 Derby Art Gallery, Derbyshire, UK
- 1974 Saint Edmond's Art Centre, Salisbury, UK
- 1975 International Art Centre, London, UK
- 1975 Pentagon Gallery, Stoke on Trent, Staffordshire, UK
- 1976 Banbury College of Art, Banbury, UK
- 1976 International Art Centre, London, UK
- 1976 Saint Edmond's Art Centre, Salisbury, UK
- 1977 Safar Khan Gallery, Zamalek, Cairo, Egypt
- 1977 "Oriental Ladies in Classical Landscapes", St. Edmunds Art Centre, Salisbury, UK
- 1978 Etap Hotel, Luxor, Egypt
- 1978 Gallery El Nil, Cairo, Egypt
- 1979 Gallery El Nil, Cairo, Egypt
- 1980 359 Gallery, Nottingham, UK
- 1980 Donington Manor, Leicestershire, UK
- 1981 Patricks Gallery, San Francisco, CA. USA
- 1981 Lake Arrowhead Country Club, San Bernardino, California, USA
- 1982 Minnilusa Gallery, CA. USA
- 1983 San Bernardino Country Museum, CA. USA
- 1983 The Ebell of Los Angeles, USA
- 1983 The Nelson Rockefeller Collection, Palm Springs, CA. USA
- 1984 The Ebell of Los Angeles, USA
- 1984 San Bernardino County Museum, San Bernardino, California, USA
- 1993 Tolbooth Art Centre, Kirkcudbright, Scotland (opened by H.R.H. The Queen)
