= Environmental Transformation Fund =

Fund dealing with climate change in the United Kingdom

The Environmental Transformation Fund (ETF) is the UK’s financial commitment to tackling climate change within the UK and developing countries. There are two parts to the fund, managed separately, to reflect the different challenges of its international and national elements. The UK element of the ETF was formally launched in April 2008, its focus being to accelerate development of new low carbon energy and energy efficient technologies in the UK. The fund is administered by DECC (which was created from parts of both BIS and DEFRA).

The international element of the ETF is managed jointly by DEFRA and DFID.
