= Joe Andrew (academic) =

British academic

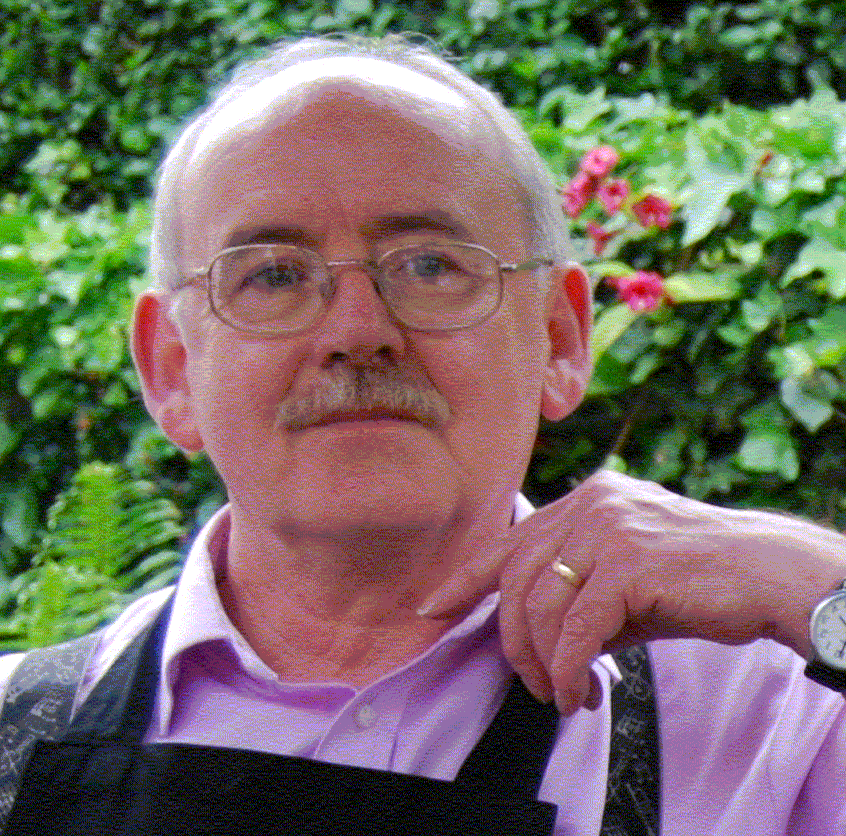
- Born: 1 June 1948 (age 77); Derby, Derbyshire, England
- Education: Bemrose Grammar School, Derby, University College, Oxford, Wolfson College, Oxford
- Occupation: Professor of russian literature at keele university
- Spouse: Barbara

Joe Andrew (born Joseph Matthew Andrew, 1 June 1948) is a British academic whose main research interests are 19th-century Russian literature, feminist approaches to literature, and women writers.

Andrew is Professor of Russian Literature at Keele University. His publishing history includes 24 books (monographs, single authored research translations, single edited books, co-edited books, and co-translated books), 61 articles (single authored articles in refereed journals, single authored chapters in books, and co-authored chapters in books), 57 translations, and 58 reviews.

== Early life ==
Joe Andrew was born in Derby, where he attended Bemrose School. He came from a non-intellectual, Roman Catholic, middle-class family. He won a scholarship to study at University College, Oxford, and, in 1969, he was awarded a first-class honours degree in Modern languages.

In 1971, whilst researching the history of the Russian literary language at Wolfson College, Oxford, Andrew joined the recently formed 'Neo-Formalist Circle'. His membership of the Circle, and his interest in Russian formalism, has continued to the present- day.

== Academic career ==
Joe Andrew was appointed lecturer in Russian studies at Keele University 1972. He became a senior lecturer in 1989 and reader in 1993. In 1995, he was elevated to professor.

Andrew's teaching has included courses on Anton Chekhov, Fyodor Dostoevsky, Nikolai Gogol, Mikhail Lermontov, Alexander Pushkin, Leo Tolstoy, Ivan Turgenev and women in Russian literature. He has delivered 70 invited lectures & conference papers all around the world.

Joe Andrew, and his departmental colleague Chris Pike, began organising the Neo-Formalist Circle from Keele University in the mid-1970s. This led to a "considerable consolidation of the Neo-Formalist Circle, to the extent that it is now very much a fixture on the British and international academic scenes" The Circle's twice-a-year journal Essays in Poetics first appeared in April 1976 and was edited by Andrew and Pike. In 1990, Robert Reid replaced Pike as both the Circle's co-chair and the journal's joint editor. Andrew remained Chair and joint editor until 2006.

During Andrew's leadership of the Neo-Formalist Circle it has organised several special conferences, on literary figures such as Chekhov, Gogol, Platonov and Pushkin. These conferences have led to the publication of a number of edited volumes.

== Activities outside the academy ==
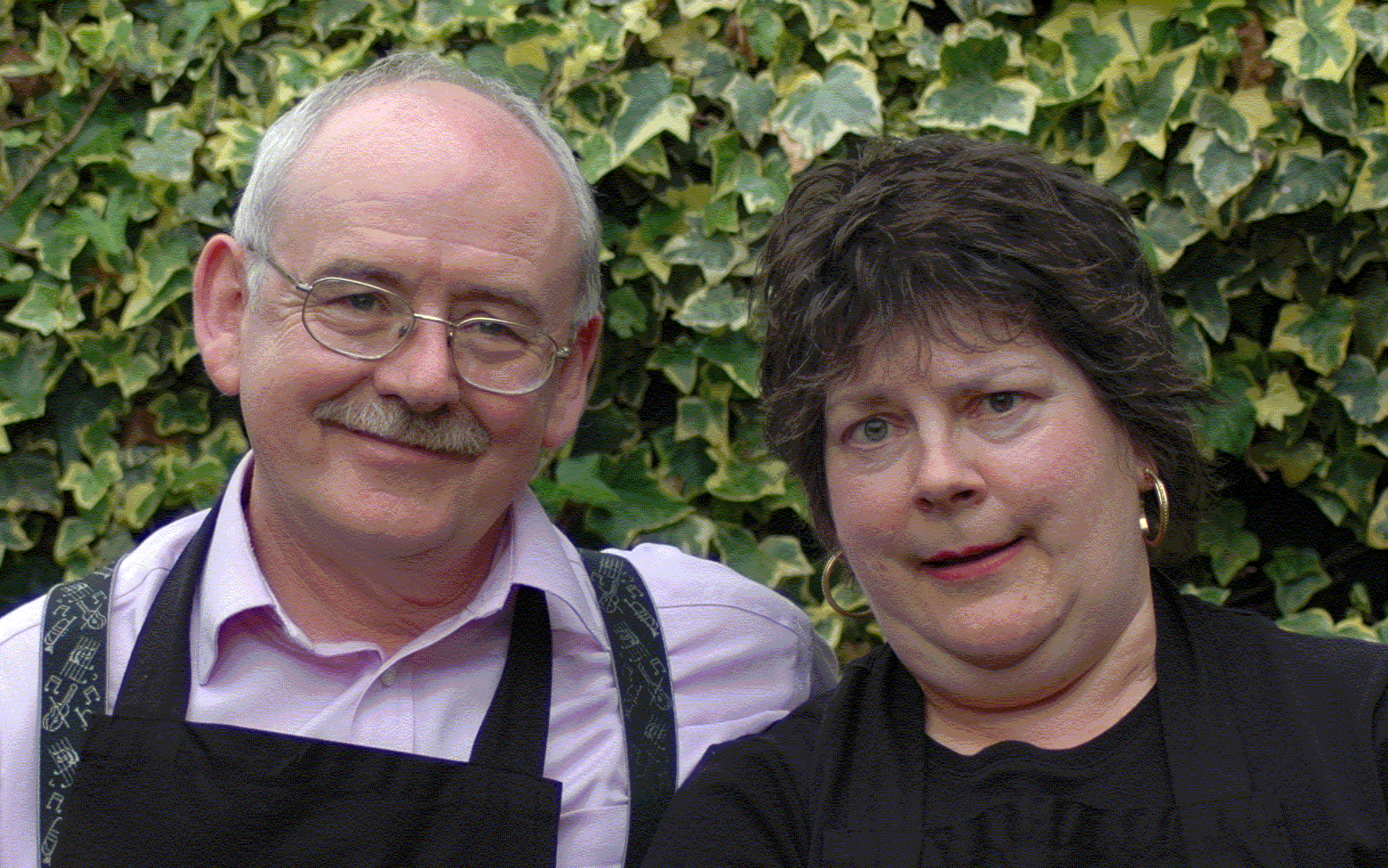
Joe Andrew and his wife Barbara

Joe Andrew has had a long history of involvement in voluntary sector organisations set up to tackle homelessness in north Staffordshire. From 1983 to 1991 he was on the voluntary board of management for Potteries Housing Association (a special needs housing charity which ran an emergency direct-access hostel in Hanley). He was a member of the North Staffs Homelessness Forum, the North Staffs Review Team for the Closure of DHSS Resettlement Units and the National Advisory Steering Group for the Closure of DHSS Resettlement Units. He served as vice-chair (1986–89) and Chair (1989–92) of North Staffs Standing Conference on Homelessness.

From 1987 to 2006, Andrew also served as the Chair of Committee of Resettlement Project North Staffs (which later became 'ARCH North Staffs), a Charitable organisation providing a range of services to vulnerable people.

Andrew rediscovered his Catholicism after meeting his wife. He is a committed campaigner for CAFOD and an active lay Catholic.

He and his wife Barbara live in Hartshill, Stoke-on-Trent. In 2022, he appeared on the BBC Two quiz show, Mastermind.

== Selected publications ==
=== Monographs ===
- Writers & Society During the Rise of Russian Realism, (Macmillan, 1980), xv + 190pp.
- Russian Writers & Society in the Second Half of the Nineteenth Century, (Macmillan, 1982), xvii+ 238 pp.
- Women in Russian Literature: 1780–1863, (Macmillan, 1988),206 pp.
- Narrative & Desire in Russian Literature, 1822–1849: The Feminine and the Masculine (Macmillan 1993), viii + 257pp
- Narrative, Space and Gender in Russian Fiction, 1846–1903, Rodopi, Amsterdam and New York, 2007, viii + 195 pp.

=== Single-authored research translation ===
- Russian Women's Shorter Fiction. An Anthology, 1835–1860 (translated and introduced, OUP, 1996), xvii + 469pp.

=== Single-edited books ===
- The Structural Analysis of Russian Narrative Fiction, (EIP Publications, 1984) ed. & intro., xxix + 165 pp.
- Poetics of the Text: Essays to Celebrate Twenty Years of the Neo-Formalist Circle (ed., and intro., Rodopi, Amsterdam, 1992), xx + 213pp.

=== Co-edited books ===
- Literary Tradition & Practice in Russian Culture (Papers from an International Conference on the Occasion of the Seventieth Birthday of Yury Mikhailovich Lotman. Edited with Valentina Polukhina & Robert Reid : Rodopi, Amsterdam, 1993), xii + 341 pp.
- Structure & Tradition in Russian Society. (Papers from an International Conference on the Occasion of the Seventieth Birthday of Yury Mikhailovich Lotman. Edited with Robert Reid & Valentina Polukhina: Slavica Helsingiensia 14, Helsinki, 1994), viii + 186 pp
- Essays in Honour of Yury Lotman (Russian Literature Special Number I. Edited with Robert Reid & Valentina Polukhina), Russian Literature, XXXVI-III, October 1994, pp. 243–369.
- Essays in Honour of Yury Lotman (Russian Literature Special Issue II. Edited with Robert Reid & Valentina Polukhina), Russian Literature, XXXVI-IV, November 1994, pp. 371–434.
- Neo-Formalist Papers. (edited with Robert Reid: Rodopi, Amsterdam, 1998), xi + 337pp. (ISBN 90-420-0631-5).
- Why Europe? Problems of Culture & Identity. Volume 1: Political and Historical Dimensions (edited with Malcolm Crook & Michael Waller: Macmillan, Houndmills, 2000), xi + 204pp. (0-312-22793-0).
- Why Europe? Problems of Culture & Identity. Volume 2: Media, Film, Gender, Youth & Education (edited with Malcolm Crook, Diana Holmes & Eva Kolinsky: Macmillan, Houndmills, 2000), xiii + 297pp. (0-312-22794-0).
- Two Hundred Years of Pushkin. Volume 1: ‘Pushkin’s Secret’: Russian Writers Reread and Rewrite Pushkin, edited with Robert Reid, Rodopi, Amsterdam-New York, 2003, xi + 213 pp. (90-420-0884-9)
- Two Hundred Years of Pushkin. Volume 2: Alexander Pushkin: Myth and Monument, edited with Robert Reid, Rodopi, Amsterdam-New York, 2003, x + 211 pp. (90-420-1135-1)
- Two Hundred Years of Pushkin. Volume 3: Pushkin's Legacy, edited with Robert Reid, Rodopi, Amsterdam-New York, 2004, x + 228 pp. (90-420-0958-6)
- Gogol 2002. Volume 1: Gogol and Others, edited with Robert Reid, Essays in Poetics Publications, Volume 8, 2003, ii + 220 pp.
- Gogol 2002. Volume 2: Aspects of Gogol, edited with Robert Reid, Essays in Poetics Publications, Volume 9, 2004, iv + 181 pp. ISBN 0-9509080-8-8
- Chekhov 2004. Volume 1: Aspects of Chekhov, edited with Robert Reid, Essays in Poetics Publications, Volume 10, 2005, v + 253 pp. ISBN 0-9509080-9-6
- Chekhov 2004. Volume 2: Chekhov and Others, edited with Robert Reid, Essays in Poetics Publications, Volume 11, 2006, vi + 368 pp. ISBN 0-9553138-0-5
- Turgenev and Russian Culture. Essays to Honour Richard Peace, edited with Derek Offord and Robert Reid, Rodopi, Amsterdam-New York, 2008, 372 pp. (978-90-420-2399-4)

=== Co-translated books ===
- The Futurists, the Formalists & the Marxist Critique (Ink Links, 1979): translated with C.R.Pike. 259 pp
