= Display Energy Certificate =

UK requirement to show a certificate rating energy performance in public buildings

Display Energy Certificates (DECs) are records of the actual energy usage of public buildings, introduced by a number of European governments in response to the EU Energy Performance of Buildings Directive, which all EU member states had to implement by January 2009. DECs are designed to increase transparency about the energy efficiency of public buildings. The certificate looks similar to the energy labels provided on new cars and electrical appliances such as fridges and freezers – it uses a similar scale for energy efficiency, i.e. from A to G with A being the most efficient and G the least. The aim of the Energy Performance of Buildings Directive is for the public to receive energy information about a building they are visiting.

In Ireland, the display of a DEC became mandatory for all public buildings over 1,000m² from 1 January, 2009. Since 9 July 2015, all public buildings in the UK over 250m² must display a DEC prominently at all times. Where the building has a total useful floor area of more than 1,000m², a UK DEC is valid for 12 months. The accompanying advisory report is valid for seven years. Where the building has a total useful floor area of between 250m² and 999m², the DEC and advisory report are valid for 10 years.

DECs are not required in public buildings in Scotland. EPCs are used instead.

DECs are designed to promote the improvement of the energy performance of buildings. The A3 sized certificate is valid for one year and is accompanied by an Advisory Report (AR) which is valid for seven years. The advisory report is designed to help building owners and occupiers to improve the energy efficiency of their buildings so that future DECs show a better rating. ARs do not need to be displayed, but must be available.

DECs and ARs must be undertaken by an accredited energy assessors using approved software. In order to produce the DEC the energy assessor needs to know the gross internal floor area of the building and the operating hours together with actual meter readings or consignment notes for all fuels used during the year of assessment. It is, therefore, important for owners and occupiers of public buildings over 1,000m² to maintain good records of fuel used. If the energy assessor does not have access to suitable and sufficient information then a DEC cannot be produced.

== United Kingdom ==
The option to generate a default G rating was withdrawn in the UK on April 16, 2011.

The penalty for each breach is £500 for failing to display a DEC at all times in a prominent place clearly visible to the public and £1,000 for failing to have possession of a valid advisory report. In addition to these penalties, it is still necessary to commission a DEC and an advisory report.

In the future the Government is expected to extend the requirement for DECs large privately owned buildings which the public have access to, such as supermarkets.

DEC_Guildance

== See also ==
- Energy Performance Certificate
- Energy use and conservation in the United Kingdom
- Energy White Paper
