= Nuclear Safeguards and Electricity (Finance) Act 1978 =

Act of the Parliament of the United Kingdom

Nuclear Safeguards and Electricity (Finance) Act 1978 (Note: Section 6(1).)
- Act of Parliament
- Parliament of the United Kingdom
- Long title: An Act to make provision for giving effect to an International Agreement for the application of Safeguards in the United Kingdom in connection with the Treaty on the Non-Proliferation of Nuclear Weapons; and to authorise contributions by the Secretary of State to expenditure by the Central Electricity Generating Board in connection with the construction of the second stage of the Board's generating station at Drax.
- Citation: 1978 c. 25
- Introduced by: Anthony Wedgewood Benn, Secretary of State for Energy, on 24 April 1978 (Second Reading) (Commons)
- Territorial extent: United Kingdom (Note: Section 6(2).)

Dates
- Royal assent: 30 June 1978
- Commencement: 30 June 1978 (Note: The Acts of Parliament (Commencement) Act 1793.)
Other legislation
Amends	Atomic Energy Authority Act 1954; Nuclear Installations Act 1965
Amended by	Electricity Act 1989; Statute Law (Repeals) Act 1993; Nuclear Safeguards Act 2000; Energy Act 2013; Nuclear Safeguards (EU Exit) Regulations 2019

Status: Amended

Text of statute as originally enacted

Revised text of statute as amended

Text of the Nuclear Safeguards and Electricity (Finance) Act 1978 as in force today (including any amendments) within the United Kingdom, from legislation.gov.uk.

The Nuclear Safeguards and Electricity (Finance) Act 1978 (c. 25) is an act of the Parliament of the United Kingdom which gave effect to safeguards associated with the international agreement on nuclear weapons. It also authorised the financing of Drax power station.

== Background ==
The Treaty on the Non-proliferation of Nuclear Weapons was made on 6 September 1976. In an agreement between the European Atomic Energy Community and the International Atomic Energy Agency the UK had a Safeguards Agreement in connection with the Treaty. This Act gave effect to that agreement.

Parliament agreed that the Central Electricity Generating Board could use up to £50 million to build the second stage of the Drax power station in Yorkshire.

== provisions ==
The act received Royal Assent on 30 June 1978. Its long title is ‘An Act to make provision for giving effect to an International Agreement for the application of Safeguards in the United Kingdom in connection with the Treaty on the Non-Proliferation of Nuclear Weapons; and to authorise contributions by the Secretary of State to expenditure by the Central Electricity Generating Board in connection with the construction of the second stage of the Board’s generating station at Drax.’

The act comprised six sections:

- Section 1 The Safeguards Agreement. Agreement initially presented to Parliament on 3 March 1977.
- Section 2 Rights of Agency inspectors. Making an inspection, prohibited places controlled by the Atomic Energy Authority, making false statements, fines.
- Section 3 Regulations for giving effect to certain provisions of Safeguards Agreement. The Secretary of State empowered to make regulations associated with the Safeguards Agreement.
- Section 4 Offences by bodies Corporate, Offences by individuals and bodies corporate.
- Section 5 Contributions by Secretary of State towards expenditure in connection with stage two of Drax power station
- Section 6 Short title and extent. The act extends to Northern Ireland

== Effects ==
The construction of stage two of Drax power station was completed in May 1986. The Safeguards Agreement has been periodically revised; the current (2022) version was made in Vienna on 7 June 2018. The Nuclear Safeguards were extended to Guernsey, Jersey and Isle of Man in 2004. There is an altered relationship between the UK and the European Union as a result of Brexit.

== Amendment ==
The act has been amended to include updated versions of the Safeguards Agreement, and the inclusion of the Crown Dependencies under the terms of the act. Section 5 of the Safeguards Act was repealed by the Electricity Act 1989.

== See also ==
- Timeline of the UK electricity supply industry
