= UK Energy Research Centre =

Consortium for sustainable energy research

- Abbreviation: UKERC
- Formation: April 2004 (22 years ago)
- Locations: London; Bath; Birmingham; Cardiff; Edinburgh; Exeter; Leeds; Newcastle; Norwich; Plymouth; Strathclyde; Warwick
- Region served: United Kingdom
- Director: Robert Gross
- Affiliations: UK Research and Innovation
- Website: www.ukerc.ac.uk

The UK Energy Research Centre (UKERC) carries out interdisciplinary research into sustainable future energy systems. Its whole systems research programme addresses the challenges and opportunities presented by the transition to a net zero energy system and economy.

The centre is funded by the UK Research and Innovation Energy Programme. UKERC is a distributed centre with researchers at over 20 different institutions throughout the UK, its headquarters are based at Imperial College London.

Currently in its fifth phase of funding (2024-2029), UKERC’s activities are overseen by a committee consisting of the UKERC Director, Professor Rob Gross, and eleven Co-Directors, and is advised by an independent Advisory Board.

== History ==
UKERC was established in April 2004, following a recommendation from the 2002 Energy Review initiated by Sir David King, the UK Government's Chief Scientific Advisor. The centre was set up to address key controversies in the energy field through comprehensive assessments of the current state of knowledge. The first phase of the Centre ran from 2004 - 2009.

In March 2009, £18.5 million was allocated to support the second phase of work at the UK Energy Research Centre for 2009 – 2014. Under the second phase of funding, UKERC focused on five themes: Energy Demand, Energy Supply, Energy Systems, Energy and Environment, and Technology and Policy Assessment.

In May 2014, the UK Energy Research Centre was awarded funding for a third phase of work, which ran from 2014 to 2019. This research programme focused on six core themes: future energy system pathways; resources and vectors; energy systems at multiple scales; energy, economy and societal preferences; decision making; technology, policy and assessment - with an HQ function aimed at engaging with the wider UK energy research community, policy makers and energy industry.

UKERC's interdisciplinary research studentships have enabled whole-systems interdisciplinary research across scientific, engineering and socio-economic boundaries.

== Current Activity ==
Currently in its fifth phase of funding, UKERC's research programme encompasses a variety of different activities that address the challenges and opportunities presented by the transition to a net zero energy system.

This research includes major themes on global energy challenges and their implications for the UK; the role of local and regional energy systems; interdependencies between energy systems and the environment; decarbonisation of specific sectors including transport, heat and industry; and transitions in energy infrastructures.

Alongside these activities UKERC undertakes systematic evidence reviews, hosts and curates energy data, maps and monitors public engagement with energy systems, and improves the transparency and understanding of energy models.

In July 2022, the UKERC launched a so‑called public engagement observatory designed to track public engagement efforts across the United Kingdom.

In 2024, UKERC entered its fifth phase of operation, conducting research up until 2029.

== Recent Research ==
- Review of Energy Policy 2024, Rob Gross et al, 2024.
- Energy Modelling in the UK: The modelling landscape. Neil Strachan and Pei-Hao Li, 2021.
- Review of Energy Policy 2020. Rob Gross et al., 2020.
- The Pathway to Net Zero Heating in the UK. Jan Rosenow et al., 2020.
- Financing Community Energy Case Studies. Iain Cairns et al., 2020
- Fostering Successful Policy Engagements: recommendations for PhD and ECR schemes. Sioned Haf et al., 2020.
- Progressing New Voices and Gender Balance in Energy Research. Programme report, 2019.
- Review of Energy Policy 2019. Jim Watson et al., 2019.
