= Energy Act 2010 =

Act of the Parliament of the United Kingdom

Energy Act 2010 (Note: Section 39.)
- Act of Parliament
- Parliament of the United Kingdom
- Long title: An Act to make provision relating to the demonstration, assessment and use of carbon capture and storage technology; to make provision about reports on decarbonisation of electricity generation and development and use of carbon capture and storage technology; to make provision for requiring benefits to be provided by holders of gas or electricity supply licences; to make provision about functions of the Gas and Electricity Markets Authority; to make provision about general duties of the Secretary of State in relation to gas and electricity markets; to make provision about electricity generation licences; to make provision about persons authorised to supply gas or electricity; and for connected purposes.
- Citation: 2010 c. 27
- Introduced by: Ed Miliband, Secretary of State for Energy and Climate Change (Commons); Lord Hunt of Kings Heath, Minister of State for Sustainable Development, Climate Change Adaptation and Air Quality (Lords)
- Territorial extent: England and Wales; Scotland; (Note: Section 37.)

Dates
- Royal assent: 8 April 2010
- Commencement: 8 April 2010 (in part); 8 June 2010 (rest of act); (Note: Section 38.)
Other legislation
Amended by	Scotland Act 2016

Status: Amended

History of passage through Parliament

Text of statute as originally enacted

Revised text of statute as amended

The Energy Act 2010 (c. 27) is an act of the Parliament of the United Kingdom pertaining to the regulation of energy usage and markets, with amendments to similar pieces of previous legislation. The act was granted royal assent on 8 April 2010 along with a series of other bills during the wash-up period prior to the 2010 general election.

== History ==
=== House of Commons ===
Introduced by Ed Miliband MP, the then-Secretary of State for Energy and Climate Change, the Energy Bill had its first reading on 19 November 2009. On 7 December of the same year, the Bill received its second reading and first debate, during which the Labour Party and the Liberal Democrats agreed on the continuation of the Energy Bill to become law, while facing opposition from the Conservative Party. While Miliband received questions over grid access, gas storage, and the Government's support of the European "super-grid," the Bill was passed to the committee stage.

== Legislation ==
The Energy Act 2010 is subdivided into four parts: carbon capture storage and regulation, schemes for reducing fuel poverty, regulations of gas and electricity markets, and final provisions. Each of these parts contains a number of sections and clauses, with a total of 39 sections throughout the act.

=== Carbon capture energy and storage ===
Part one of the Act details the powers of the Secretary of State for Energy and Climate Change to provide funding for carbon capture and storage (CCS) projects, at the same time being allowed to withhold or cease funding CCS demonstrations. There are also provisions for the Secretary of State to impose a "supply levy" upon those who use supplies of electricity. Further, section five requires that the Secretary of State provide a report every three years on the state of both decarbonising electricity and the development of new carbon capturing technologies.
