= Department of Energy and Climate Change =

Former department of the UK Government

Department of Energy and Climate Change Welsh: Yr Adran Ynni a Newid yn yr Hinsawdd

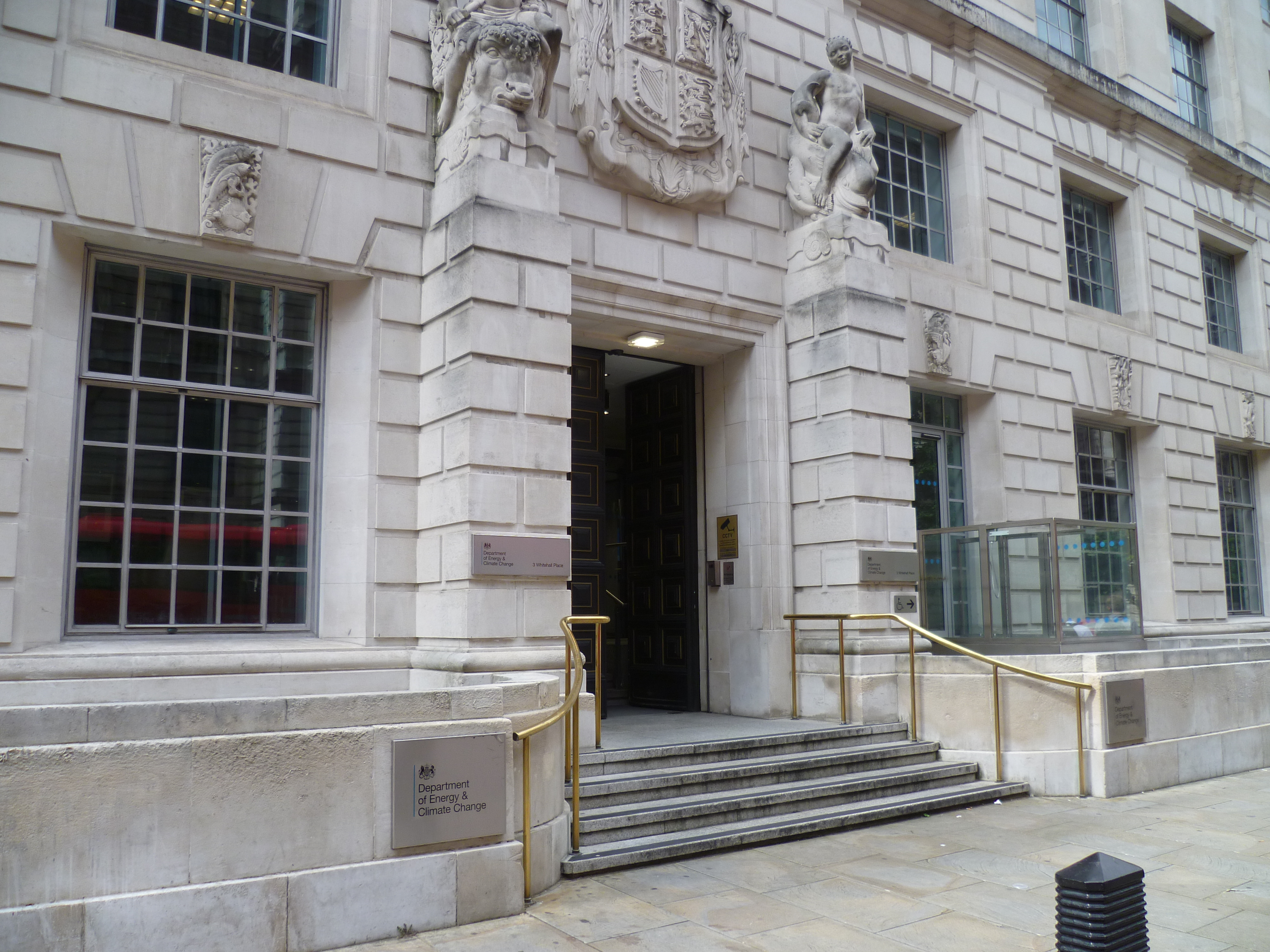
- 3 Whitehall Place, London

Department overview
- Formed: 2008
- Dissolved: 14 July 2016
- Jurisdiction: United Kingdom
- Headquarters: 3 Whitehall Place, London
- Annual budget: £1.5 billion (current) & £1.5 billion (capital) in 2011–12
- Child Department: Oil and Gas Authority
- Website: www.gov.uk/decc

The Department of Energy and Climate Change (DECC) was a department of the government of the United Kingdom created on 3 October 2008, by Prime Minister Gordon Brown to take over some of the functions related to energy of the Department for Business, Enterprise and Regulatory Reform, and those relating to climate change of the Department for Environment, Food and Rural Affairs.

It was led at time of closure by the secretary of state for energy and climate change, Amber Rudd MP. Following Theresa May's appointment as Prime Minister in July 2016, Rudd became Home Secretary and the department was disbanded and merged with the Department for Business, Innovation and Skills, to form the Department for Business, Energy and Industrial Strategy under Greg Clark MP.

The department released a major White Paper in July 2009, setting out its purpose and plans. The majority of DECC's budget was spent on managing the historic nuclear sites in the United Kingdom, in 2012/13 this being 69% of its budget spent through the Nuclear Decommissioning Authority. The costs to the government of nuclear decommissioning are expected to increase when the last of the United Kingdom's Magnox reactors are shut down and no longer produce an income.

The department was somewhat resurrected in February 2023 with the creation of the Department for Energy Security and Net Zero, carrying almost the same responsibilities as this department once did.

== Ministers ==
=== Secretaries of State ===
- Ed Miliband (2008–10)
- Chris Huhne (2010–12)
- Ed Davey (2012–15)
- Amber Rudd (2015–16)

=== Ministers of State ===
- Mike O'Brien (2008–09)
- Joan Ruddock (2009–10)
- Charles Hendry (2010–12)
- John Hayes (2012–13)
- Michael Fallon (2013–14)
- Matthew Hancock (2014–15)
- Andrea Leadsom (2015–16)

== Management ==
- Permanent Secretary (7 January 2013 – 14 July 2016) Stephen Lovegrove.
- Acting Permanent Secretary (1 November 2012 – January 2013) Phil Wynn Owen.
- Chief Scientific Advisor (October 2014 – 14 July 2016) John Loughhead; (October 2009 – 31 July 2014) David J. C. MacKay.

== Department of Energy and Climate Change (Abolition) Bills 2014–15 and 2015–16 ==
In July 2014, a private member's bill was proposed in Parliament, sponsored by Conservative MP Peter Bone, to abolish the Department of Energy and Climate Change and absorb its portfolio into the Department for Business, Innovation and Skills. In the House of Commons, it was scheduled for a second reading on 6 March 2015. However, as a private members bill, it was unlikely to be passed without government support, which in the event it failed to get.

Mr Bone reintroduced his Bill on 29 June 2015. It did not progress beyond its first reading. However, the proposed disbanding and merger did occur, shortly after the appointment of Theresa May as Prime Minister.

== Devolution ==
The devolution of energy policy varies around the United Kingdom; most aspects in Great Britain are decided at Westminster. Key reserved and excepted energy matters (i.e. not devolved) are as follows:

Scotland

- electricity
- oil and gas
- coal
- climate change
- nuclear energy
- energy efficiency

Northern Ireland

Nuclear energy is excepted.

The Department of Enterprise, Trade and Investment is responsible for general energy policy.

Wales

Under the Welsh devolution settlement, specific policy areas are transferred to the National Assembly for Wales rather than reserved to Westminster.

== See also ==
- Department of Energy (UK)
- Climate change in the United Kingdom
- Energy and Climate Change Select Committee
- Energy policy of the United Kingdom
- Energy use and conservation in the United Kingdom
