= 2016 New Year Honours =

Award of British honours

The New Year Honours 2016 were appointments by some of the 16 Commonwealth realms to various orders and honours to recognise and reward good works by citizens of those countries. The New Year Honours are awarded as part of the New Year celebrations at the start of January. The official lists of the 2016 New Year Honours for civilians and military were announced on 31 December.

The recipients of honours are displayed as they were styled before their new honour and arranged by the country (in order of precedence) whose ministers advised The Queen on the appointments, then by honour with grades i.e. Knight/Dame Grand Cross, Knight/Dame Commander etc. and then divisions i.e. Civil, Diplomatic and Military as appropriate.

== United Kingdom ==
Below are the individuals appointed by Elizabeth II in her right as Queen of the United Kingdom with honours within her own gift and with the advice of the Government for other honours.

- 1,196 people were awarded honours.
- The majority of the recipients (1,044) received OBE (243), MBE (472) or British Empire Medal (329) awards.
- 578 of the honorees are women, representing 48% of the total.
- 5.7% of the recipients are ethnic minorities.
- The youngest recipient is 13-year-old Jonjo Heuerman, who was awarded the British Empire Medal for raising more than £235,000 (~USD$350k) for cancer research.

=== Member of the Order of Merit (OM) ===
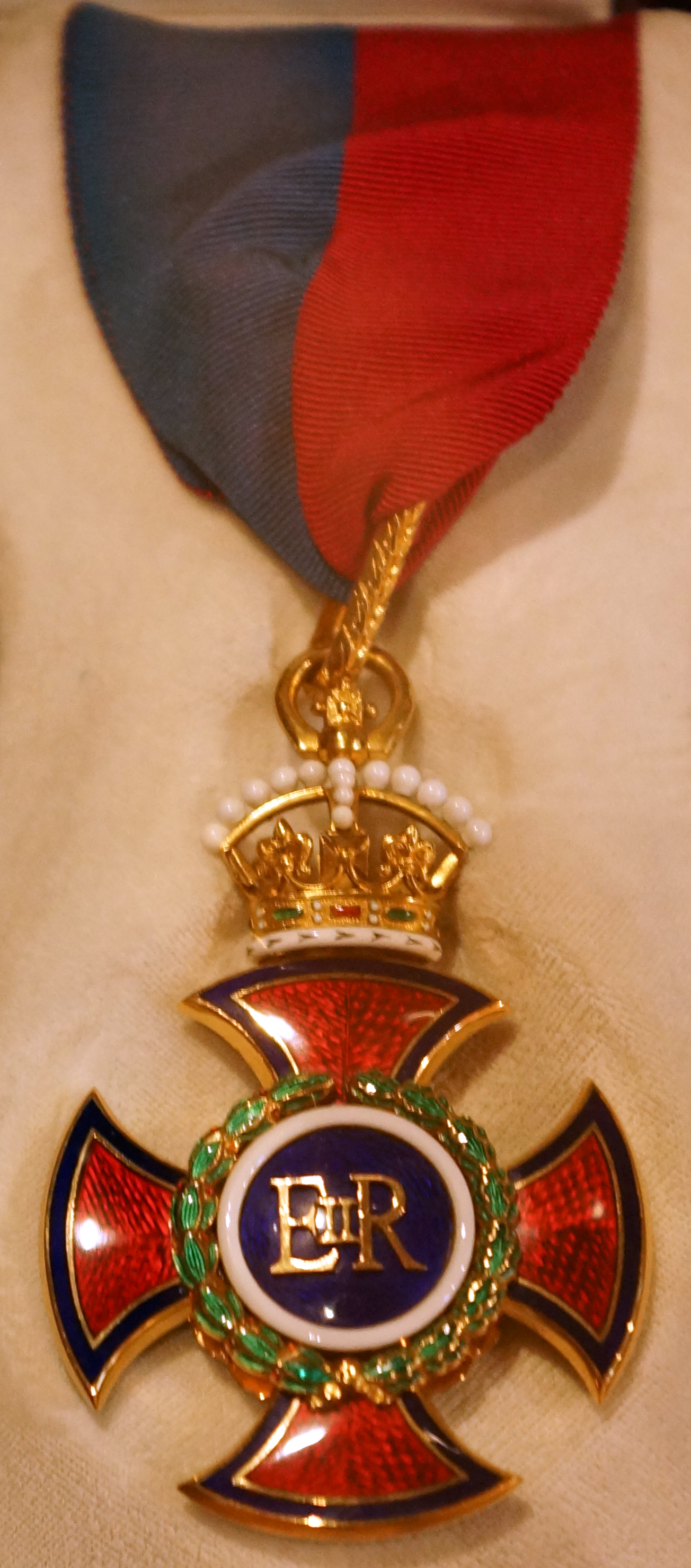
The riband and badge of the Order of Merit

- The Right Honourable The Lord Darzi of Denham KBE PC FRS, for medicine
- Dame Ann Dowling DBE FRS, for engineering
- Sir James Dyson CBE FRS, for design

=== Member of the Order of the Companions of Honour (CH) ===
- Sir Roy Strong – For services to Culture.

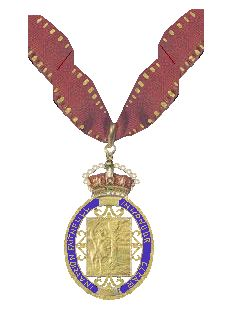
The riband and badge of a Member of the Order of the Companions of Honour

=== Knight Bachelor ===
- Henry Campbell Bellingham, MP, Member of Parliament for North West Norfolk. For political and parliamentary service.
- Matthew Christopher Bourne, OBE, Choreographer. For services to Dance.
- Colin Nigel Callender, CBE, Television, film and theatre producer. For services to the British creative industries, promoting British film, theatre and television in international markets.
- Dr. David John Collins, CBE, Further Education Commissioner. For services to Further Education.
- Clive Cowdery, Philanthropist and Founder, Resolution Foundation. For services to Children and Social Mobility.
- Lynton Keith Crosby, AO, Lately Campaign Director, Conservative Party. For political service.
- Professor Paul James Curran, Vice-Chancellor, City University London. For services to Higher Education.
- The Right Honourable Edward Jonathan Davey. For political and public service.
- Jonathan Stephen Day, CBE, Lately Chair, Joint Intelligence Committee, Cabinet Office. For public service.
- William Robert Fittall. For services to the Church of England.
- The Honourable Nicholas James Forwood, QC, Judge of the General Court, Court of Justice of the European Union. For services to European justice
- Paul Edward Grice, Clerk and Chief Executive, Scottish Parliament. For services to the Scottish Parliament and voluntary service to Higher Education and the community in Scotland.
- Dr Michael Graham Jacobs, Clinical Lead in Infectious Diseases, Royal Free London NHS Foundation Trust. For services to the Prevention and Treatment of Infectious Diseases.
- Harpal Singh Kumar, Chief Executive, Cancer Research UK. For services to Cancer Research.
- Steve Lancashire, Founder and chief executive officer, REAch2 and Executive Headteacher, Hillyfield Primary Academy, London Borough of Waltham Forest. For services to Education.
- Martyn John Dudley, CBE. For services to the Voluntary and Charitable Sectors particularly the Hospice Movement.
- Professor David John Cameron MacKay, Regius Professor of Engineering, Cambridge University Engineering Department. For services to Scientific Advice in Government and Science Outreach.
- Anthony Peter McCoy, OBE. For services to Horse Racing.
- Harvey Andrew McGrath. For services to Economic Growth and Public Life.
- David Ronald Norgrove, chair, Low Pay Commission and chair, Family Justice Board. For services to the Low Paid and the Family Justice System.
- Jack Petchey, CBE. For services to Young People in East London and Essex through the Jack Petchey Foundation.
- Norman Kelvin Stoller, CBE. For philanthropic service.
- Robert Talma Stheeman, CB, chief executive officer, Debt Management Office. For services to UK Government Debt Management.
- John Michael Leal Uren, OBE. For philanthropic service.
- Alan Colin Drake Yarrow, lately Lord Mayor of London. For services to International Business, Inclusion and the City of London.

=== Order of the Bath ===
==== Knight Grand Cross of the Order of the Bath (GCB) ====
Military Division

Royal Navy

- Admiral Sir George Zambellas KCB DSC ADC DL – First Sea Lord

Royal Air Force

- Air Chief Marshal Sir Andrew Pulford KCB CBE ADC – Chief of the Air Staff

==== Knight / Dame Commander of the Order of the Bath (KCB / DCB) ====
Military Division

Army

- Lt Gen James Rupert Everard CBE – Late The Queen's Royal Lancers.

Civil Division

- Robert Devereux – Permanent Secretary of the Department for Work and Pensions and lately of the Department for Transport; for services to Transport and welfare and for voluntary service in Kilburn, London.
- Lin Homer CB – Lately Chief Executive, HM Revenue and Customs; for public service, particularly to Public Finance.

==== Companion of the Order of the Bath (CB) ====
Military Division

Royal Navy

- Rear Admiral James Anthony Morse OBE – Assistant Chief of Naval Staff (Capability) and Controller of the Navy

Army

- Lt Gen Timothy Paul Evans CBE DSO – Late The Light Infantry.
- Maj Gen Jeremy Francis Rowan OBE QHS – Late Royal Army Medical Corps.

Royal Air Force

- Air Vice-Marshal Timothy Lawrence John Bishop OBE – Air Officer Commanding 38 Group
- Air Vice-Marshal Martin Adrian Clark – Director (Technical) Military Aviation Authority

Civil Division

- Susan Jane Baldwin – Director, Academies and Maintained Schools Group, Department for Education. For services to Education.
- Professor Paul Anthony Cosford – Director for Health Protection and medical director, Public Health England. For services to Public Health.
- Stephen Gooding – Lately Director-General, Roads, Traffic and Local Group, Department for Transport. For public service to Transport.
- Dr. Ruth Hussey OBE – chief medical officer for Wales and medical director, NHS Wales. For services to Healthcare.
- Prof. Nick Jennings – Chief Scientific Adviser for National Security and Regius Professor, University of Southampton. For services to Computer Science and National Security Science.
- Dr. Carl Niel Kempson – Director, Foreign and Commonwealth Office. For services to British foreign policy
- Clare Moriarty – Lately Director-General, Rail Executive, Department for Transport. For services to Transport.

=== Order of Saint Michael and Saint George ===
==== Knight / Dame Grand Cross of the Order of St Michael and St George (GCMG) ====
- Sir Simon Fraser KCMG – Former Permanent Under Secretary, Foreign and Commonwealth Office. For services to the FCO and the pursuit of British foreign policy interests

==== Knight / Dame Commander of the Order of St Michael and St George (KCMG / DCMG) ====
- Malcolm Evans OBE – chair, United Nations Subcommittee for the Prevention of Torture. For services to torture prevention and religious freedom
- Judith Macgregor CMG LVO – High Commissioner, Pretoria, South Africa. For services to British diplomacy
- Ivan Rogers – Permanent Representative to the European Union. For services to British European and International Policy

==== Companion of the Order of St Michael and St George (CMG) ====
- Dr. John Freeman – HM Ambassador, Buenos Aires, Argentina. For services to the promotion and defence of British interests in Argentina
- Denis Keefe – HM Ambassador, Belgrade, Serbia. For services to British foreign policy
- John James Rankin – Former High Commissioner, Colombo, Sri Lanka and the Maldives. For services to British foreign policy
- Paul John Ritchie – Director, Foreign and Commonwealth Office. For services to enhancing Diplomacy and National Security
- Caroline Elizabeth Wilson – Consul General, Hong Kong and Macao. For services to British foreign policy

=== Royal Victorian Order ===
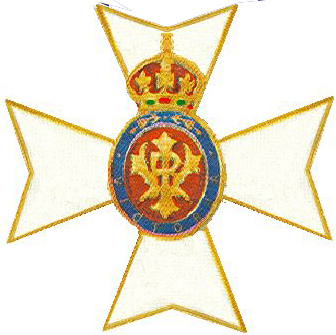
Star of a Commander or Lieutenant of the Royal Victorian Order

==== Commander of the Royal Victorian Order (CVO) ====
- Brian Leslie Davies, LVO, formerly Official Secretary to the Governor of New South Wales, Australia.
- Alexander Matheson, OBE, Lord-Lieutenant of the Western Isles.
- Jeremy Patrick Bagwell Purefoy, LVO, Assistant Secretary (Insignia), Central Chancery of the Orders of Knighthood.
- Jean Douglas Tulloch, Lord Lieutenant of Dumfries.
- Gerrard Tyrrell, MVO, Solicitor, Harbottle and Lewis.
- Professor Howard John Williamson, CBE, formerly Trustee, The Duke of Edinburgh's Award Scheme.

==== Lieutenant of the Royal Victorian Order (LVO) ====
- Christopher John Adcock – chief financial officer, Duchy of Lancaster.
- Lucinda Katharine Elizabeth Baker – Deputy Private Secretary to The Duchess of Gloucester.
- Sophia Louisa Densham – Assistant Private Secretary to the Duchess of Cornwall.
- Allison Sharaon Patricia Derrett MVO – Assistant Archivist, Royal Archives.
- Dr. Timothy Hugh David Evans – Apothecary to The Queen and to the Royal Households.
- Commodore John Rowland Hance CBE – formerly Gentleman Usher to The Queen.
- Major General Alasdair Ian Gordon Kennedy CB CBE – formerly Gentleman Usher to The Queen.
- David Kim Parry – Director, Outward Bound Trust.
- David Paul Pogson MVO – Senior Communications Officer, Royal Household.
- Sarah Squire – Head of HR Services, Royal Household.
- Dr. Richard Charles David Staughton – Consultant Dermatologist.

==== Member of the Royal Victorian Order (MVO) ====
- Harry Ian Collins – For services to the Duke of Edinburgh's International Award.
- Alan William Goodship RVM – Kennel Man, Sandringham Estate.
- Ruth Marguerite Hackney – formerly Personal Assistant to the Deputy Ranger, Windsor Great Park.
- Lorraine Denise King – Deputy Clerk to the Lieutenancy of Essex.
- Simon David Metcalf – Armourer, Royal Collection.
- Barry John Mitford RVM – The Queen's Page.
- Martin Paul Oates RVM – Senior Carriage Restorer, Royal Mews.
- Stewart Charles Reginald Parvin – Dressmaker to The Queen.
- Tracy Richardson – Enterprise Executive, The Prince's Trust.
- Ian David Arthur Russell – Registrar and Seneschal of the Cinque Ports.
- Paul Anthony Lynden Singer – Director of Operations, Government House, Canberra.
- Sergeant Andrew David Thomas – Metropolitan Police. For services to Royalty Protection.
- Margaret Rose Walker – Housekeeper, Birkhall.
- Brian Redvers Watts – Volunteer, The Prince's Trust.

=== Royal Victorian Medal (RVM) ===
Gold Medal

- David Berwick RVM – Valet to The Duke of Edinburgh.
- Cecil John Nelson MVO RVM – formerly Coaching Instructor, Royal Mews.

Silver Medal

- Ian Leslie Bullock – Fire and Security Officer, Palace of Holyroodhouse.
- Dugald Cameron – Storeman, Aberdovey Centre, Outward Bound Trust.
- Constable Gary Robert Copeland – Metropolitan Police. For services to Royalty Protection.
- Joanne Dermott – Assistant Dresser to The Queen.
- Keven Rodger Dunger – Senior Stud Hand, Royal Studs.
- Peter John Gillan – Visitor Services Assistant, Balmoral Castle.
- Clive John Lockyer – Senior Gardener, Government House, Perth.
- Daren James Palmer – Gardener, Sandringham Estate.
- Neil Leslie Turner – Senior Attendant, Windsor Castle.
- Constable James Michael Williams – Metropolitan Police. For services to Royalty Protection.

=== The Most Excellent Order of the British Empire ===
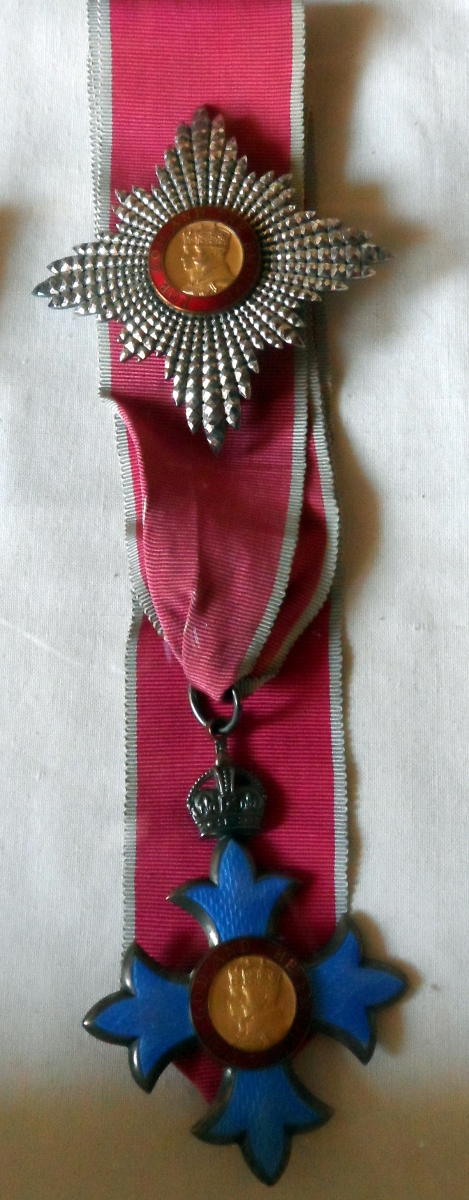
Insignia of a Knight Commander of the Order of the British Empire

==== Knight Grand Cross of the Order of the British Empire (GBE) ====
Military Division

- Air Chief Marshal Sir Stuart William Peach KCB CBE ADC DL – Vice-Chief of the Defence Staff

==== Dame Commander of the Order of the British Empire (DBE) ====
- Professor Lesley Jean Fallowfield, Director, Sussex Health Outcomes Research and Education in Cancer, University of Sussex. For services to Psycho-Oncology.
- Judith Elizabeth Hackitt, CBE FREng, chair, Health and Safety Executive. For services to Engineering and Health and Safety.
- Susan Jowett, Chief Executive, The Spencer Academies Trust and Executive Principal, George Spencer Academy, Nottinghamshire. For services to Education.
- Professor Georgina Mary Mace, CBE FRS, Professor of Biodiversity and Ecosystems and Director, Centre for Biodiversity and Environment Research, University College London. For services to Science.
- Natalie Sara Massenet, MBE, Internet Entrepreneur and Founder, Net-a-Porter Group. For services to the Fashion and Retail Industries.
- Carolyn Julia McCall, OBE, chief executive officer, easyJet. For services to the Aviation Industry.
- Professor Henrietta Louise Moore, FBA, Director, UCL Institute for Global Prosperity, and chair, Culture, Philosophy and Design, University College London. For services to Social Sciences.
- Jane Elizabeth Ailwen (Sian) Phillips, CBE, Actress. For services to Drama.
- Heather Victoria Rabbatts, CBE. For public service and services to Football and Equality.
- Glenys Jean Stacey (Mrs Kyle), Chief Regulator and Chief Executive, Ofqual (Office for Qualifications and Examinations Regulation). For services to Education.
- Professor Margaret McRae Whitehead, Head, Department of Public Health and Policy, Institute of Psychology, Health and Society, University of Liverpool. For services to Public Health.
- Barbara Windsor, MBE. For services to charity and Entertainment.
- The Right Honourable Rosalie (Rosie) Winterton, MP, Member of Parliament for Doncaster Central and Opposition Chief Whip. For political and parliamentary service.
- Professor Til Hilary Margaret Wykes, Vice-Dean of Psychology and Systems Sciences and Professor of Clinical Psychology and Rehabilitation, King's College London. For services to Clinical Psychology.

==== Knight Commander of the Order of the British Empire (KBE) ====
- Air Marshal Sir Simon John Bollom CB – Chief of Materiel – Air at the Defence Equipment and Support

==== Commander of the Order of the British Empire (CBE) ====
Military Division

Royal Navy

- Rear Admiral Malcolm Charles Cree – Chief of Staff (Integrated Change Programme)
- Rear Admiral Thomas Michael Karsten – UK National Hydrographer
- Rear Admiral Benjamin John Key – Flag Officer Sea Training and Assistant Chief of Naval Staff (Training)

Army

- Colonel Tom Yori Griffiths – Late Army Air Corps
- Brigadier Mark Charles van der Lande OBE – Late the Life Guards.
- Colonel Malcolm Paul Llewellyn OBE – Late Royal Corps of Signals.
- Brigadier Gary Stephen Morris – Late Adjutant General's Corps (Educational and Training Services Branch)

Royal Air Force

- Air Commodore Jonathan Nigel Ager – Commanding Officer, Air Mobility Force
- Air Commodore David Joseph Waddington – Force Commander, Tornado and Air Commodore, F35B Lightning
- Group Captain Paul Joseph Warwick – Chief British military support to the National Ebola Response Centre situation room, in Freetown, Sierra Leone

Civil Division

- Peta Joyce Ash, chief executive officer, Southampton Voluntary Services. For services to the Voluntary Sector.
- Richard James Atkins, Principal, Exeter College and President, Association of Colleges. for services to Further Education.
- His Honour Michael Findlay Baker QC DL, lately Resident Judge, Crown Court, St. Albans and Deputy Circuit Judge. For services to the Administration of Justice and to the community in Hertfordshire
- Professor Phyllida Barlow, Sculptor. For services to Art.
- Rhona Julia Barnfield, chief executive officer, the Howard Partnership Trust and Executive Head, Howard of Effingham School, Thomas Knyvett College and Oxted School, Surrey. For services to Education.
- John Baxter, lately Group Head of Engineering, BP International plc. For services to Engineering, Education and the Energy Sector.
- Graham John Beale, chief executive officer, Nationwide Building Society. For services to the Financial Services Sector.
- Robert Fredrick Behrens, Chief Executive and Independent Adjudicator, Office of the Independent Adjudicator for Higher Education. For services to Higher Education.
- Professor Vivienne Jane Bennett, Chief Nurse, Public Health England. For services to Nursing.
- Guy Gibson Beringer, Non-Executive Chairman, UK Export Finance. For services to Export Finance and Pro Bono Work in the Legal Sector.
- Conrad Bird, Director, GREAT Britain Campaign. For services to UK Government Communications and Trade.
- Sharon Tracey Blackburn, Policy and Communications Director, National Care Forum. For services to Nursing and the Not-ForProfit Care Sector.
- Roy Terence Blatchford, Director, National Education Trust. For services to Education.
- Professor Paul Joseph Boyle, lately Chief Executive, Economic and Social Research Council and President and Vice Chancellor, University of Leicester. For services to Social Science.
- Dr Timothy John Gilby Brooks, Head, Rare and Imported Pathogens Laboratory, Public Health England. For services to Public Health.
- Dorothy Marie Brown, Director for Personal Tax Operations, H.M. Revenue and Customs. For services to Taxpayers.
- Professor Christopher John Kent Bulstrode, emeritus Professor, Green Templeton College, University of Oxford and Volunteer, Doctors of the World. For services to Humanitarian Medicine.
- Professor Wendy Joan Carlin, Professor of Economics, University College London and Member, Expert Advisory Panel, Office for Budget Responsibility. For services to Economics and Public Finance.
- Professor Barry Carpenter OBE, International Professor of Learning Disabilities. For services to Special Educational Needs.
- Professor Steven Kenneth Chapman, lately Principal and Vice- Chancellor, Heriot-Watt University. For services to Higher Education.
- Zameer Mohammed Choudrey. For services to the UK Wholesale Industry and charity in the UK and Abroad.
- Professor David Alastair Standish Compston, Professor of Neurology, University of Cambridge. For services to Multiple Sclerosis Treatment.
- Dr Vivienne Cox. For services to the UK Economy and Sustainability.
- Professor John Coyne, lately Vice-Chancellor, University of Derby. For services to Higher Education.
- Professor Charles Frank Craddock, Professor of Haemato- Oncology, University of Birmingham and Consultant Haematologist, Queen Elizabeth Hospital, Birmingham. for services to Medicine and Medical Research.
- Professor Melanie Jane Davies, Professor of Diabetes Medicine, University of Leicester and Honorary Consultant, University Hospitals of Leicester. For services to Diabetes Research.
- Samir Desai, Peer to Peer and Financial Inclusion Innovator. For services to Financial Services.
- Air Commodore Martin Terry Doel OBE, Chief Executive, Association of Colleges. For services to Further Education.
- Ian Gareth Dormer, lately National Chairman, Institute of Directors. For services to Business particularly in the North East.
- Rowan Malcolm Douglas, chief executive officer, Capital Science and Policy Practice, Willis Group. For services to the Economy through Risk, Insurance and Sustainable Growth.
- Simon Charles Dow, Group Chief Executive, the Guinness Partnership. For services to Housing and Homeless People.
- Timothy James Dutton QC, Barrister, Recorder and Deputy High Court Judge. For services to the UK Legal System.
- Catherine Patricia Dyer, Crown Agent and Chief Executive, Crown Office and Procurator Fiscal Service. For services to Law and Order in Scotland.
- Dr Ian Webber Evett, Consultant Forensic Scientist. For services to Forensic Science.
- Paul David Charles Farmer, Chief Executive, Mind. For services to Mental Health.
- Paul Maurice Fuller QFSM, Chief Fire Officer, Bedfordshire Fire and Rescue Service. For services to the Fire and Rescue Service.
- Professor Nigel Paul Gibbens, Chief Veterinary Officer, Department for Environment, Food and Rural Affairs. For services to the Veterinary Profession and Animal Welfare.
- Jacqueline Gold, Chief Executive, Ann Summers and Knickerbox. For services to Entrepreneurship, Women in Business and Social Enterprise.
- Dr Caroline Harper OBE, chief executive officer, Sightsavers. For services to Visually Impaired People Abroad.
- Councillor Simon Antony Henig, Leader, Durham County Council. For political and public service.
- Dr Barry Keith Humphreys, lately chairman, British Air Transport Association. For services to Aviation and charity.
- David Neil Jameson, executive director, Citizens UK. For services to Community Organising and Social Justice.
- Timothy Lloyd Jones, lately chief executive officer, National Employment Savings Trust. For services to the Pensions Industry and Pension Provision.
- David Joseph, chair and chief executive officer, Universal Music UK and Ireland. For services to the UK Music Industry.
- Sandra Jane Keene, Director of Adult Social Services and President, Leeds City Council and ADASS. For services to Social Care.
- Professor Deirdre Anne Kelly, Consultant Paediatric Hepatologist, Birmingham Children's Hospital NHS Foundation Trust. For services to Children and Young People with Liver Disease.
- Julia Killick, Governor. H.M. Prison Holloway. For services to HM Prison Service.
- David Christopher Lane, lately vice-president, Professional Association for Childcare and Early Years. For services to Childcare and Social Work.
- Professor David Michael Lane, Professor of Autonomous Systems Engineering, Heriot Watt University and Founding Director, Edinburgh Centre for Robotics. For services to Engineering.
- Gerald Lavery, lately Senior Finance Director, Department of Agriculture and Rural Development, Northern Ireland Executive. For services to the Agri-Food Industry in Northern Ireland.
- Denis Law. For services to Football and charity.
- Francis Henry Lee. For services to Football and charity.
- Dr Tracy Elisabeth Long, Founder, Boardroom Review Ltd. For services to Public and Private Sector Governance.
- Professor Karen Anne Luker, lately Dean, School of Nursing, Midwifery and Social Work, University of Manchester. For services to Nursing and Midwifery.
- Radu Lupu – Pianist. For services to Music.
- Professor Catherine Elizabeth MacPhee, Professor of Biological Physics, University of Edinburgh. For services to Women in Physics.
- Professor Peter John Matthews OBE, chair, Natural Resources Wales. For services to Environmental Management.
- Professor Linda Margaret McDowell, Professor of Human Geography, University of Oxford. For services to Geography and Higher Education.
- Gillian McGregor, deputy director, Immigration Enforcement for Scotland and Northern Ireland, Home Office. For services to Immigration Management and Counter Terrorism.
- Mark McInnes, Director, Scottish Conservatives. For political service.
- Professor David Kenneth Miles, lately Member, Monetary Policy Committee. For services to Monetary Policy.
- Andrew Noel Moffat, Chief Executive, Port of Tyne. For services to the North East England Economy and UK Ports.
- Susan Jane Moore, Director, DWP Corporate Change, Department for Work and Pensions. For services to Public Administration.
- Peter Julian Robin Morgan, Screenwriter and Playwright. For services to Drama.
- Professor Peter Gordon Morris, Professor of Physics and Head of Magnetic Resonance Centre, University of Nottingham. For services to Science and Medicine.
- Professor Karen Ann Mumford (Mrs Smith). For services to Economics and Labour Market Diversity.
- Councillor Susan Christine Murphy, Deputy Leader, Manchester City Council. For political and public service.
- Maxwell George Murray, lately Senior Civil Servant, Department of Justice. For services to the Northern Ireland Prison Service.
- Professor Paul O'Brien FRS, Professor of Inorganic Materials Chemistry, University of Manchester. For services to Science and Engineering.
- Neil O'Connor, Director, Fire, Resilience and Emergencies, Department for Communities and Local Government. For services to Fire Safety and Flood Resilience.
- Jean Davies Oglesby. For services to Philanthropy in the North West.
- Bobby Paton, managing director, Accenture (North East). For services to the Promotion of IT Skills and Apprenticeships.
- Carolyn Mary (Lyndy) Payne (Mrs. Clifford). For services the Advertising and Marketing Communications Industry.
- Sarah Payne, Director, National Offender Management Service, Wales, Ministry of Justice. For services to Prisons, Probation and the community in Wales.
- Annamarie Phelps, chairman, British Rowing. For services to Rowing.
- Anthony Charles Preston, Founder, Pets at Home. For services to UK Business, Entrepreneurship and philanthropic service to charity.
- Professor Susan Ann Price, lately Vice-Chancellor, Leeds Beckett University. For services to Higher Education.
- Charles David Randell, External Member, Prudential Regulation Authority and Non-Executive Director, DECC. For services to Financial Stability and Climate Change Policy.
- Dr Raminder Singh Ranger MBE, chairman, Sun Mark Ltd. For services to Business and Community Cohesion.
- Andrew Scallan, Director of Electoral Administration, Electoral Commission. For services to Electoral Democracy.
- Professor Julia Teresa Selwyn, Professor and Director, The Hadley Centre for Adoption and Foster Care Studies, Bristol University. For services to Adoption and Children's Social Care.
- (Lucy) Nicola Shaw, chief executive officer, HighSpeed 1, and lately Non-Executive Director, Aer Lingus plc. For services to Transport.
- Jill Ann, Lady Shaw Ruddock. For philanthropic services to Older People.
- Yasmin Sheikh MBE, co-founder, British Community Honours Awards. For services to Women and Social Integration.
- William Matthew Timothy Stephen Sieghart. For services to Public Libraries.
- Dr Nina Maria Skorupska, Chief Executive, Renewable Energy Association and Non-Executive Director, WISE Campaign. For services to Renewables and Equality in the Energy Industry.
- Adrian Smith, deputy director, National Offender Management Service, East of England. For services to HM Prison Service.
- Andrew John Smith OBE, Chief Executive, Hampshire County Council. For services to Local Government.
- Imelda Mary Philomena Bernadette Staunton OBE, Actress. For services to Drama.
- Christopher Berkeley Stephens, chairman, Judicial Appointments Commission. For services to the Judiciary.
- James Stewart, Treasurer, Scottish Conservatives. For political service.
- Dr Geraldine Mary Strathdee OBE, National Clinical Director for Mental Health, NHS England. For services to Mental Health
- John Surtees OBE. For services to Motorsport.
- Marion Margaret (Margie) Taylor, Chief Dental Officer for Scotland. For services to Dental Health in Scotland.
- Dr Maurice Vincent Taylor, Chief Executive, Chardon Trading. For services to Business and to charity.
- Caroline Helen Theobald (Mrs. Morse), Founder and managing director, Bridge Club Ltd. For services to Business and Entrepreneurship.
- Hugh Osborn Thornbery – Chief Executive, Adoption UK. For services to Children and Families.
- Angela Mary Fone (Jill) Tookey MBE, Founder and artistic director, National Youth Ballet of Great Britain. For services to Dance and Young People.
- Simon Richard Trace, chief executive officer, Practical Action. For services to International Development.
- Professor David Tregar Ulph FRSE, Professor of Economics and Director, Scottish Institute for Research in Economics, University of St. Andrews. For services to Economics and Social Sciences.
- Beryl Frances Vertue OBE, Producer and chair, Hartswood Films. For services to Television Drama.
- Edward Victor, Founder, Ed Victor Literary Agency. For services to the Publishing Industry.
- Professor Joanna Marguerite Wardlaw FRSE. Professor of Applied Neuroimaging and Honorary Consultant Neuroradiologist, University of Edinburgh and NHS Lothian. For services to Neuroimaging and Clinical Science.
- Professor Andrew Brian Wathey, Vice-Chancellor, Northumbria University. For services to Higher Education.
- Simon Weston OBE. For charitable services.
- Professor Keith Malcolm Willett, National Director for Acute Care, NHS England and Professor of Orthopaedic Trauma Surgery, University of Oxford. For services to the NHS.

==== Officer of the Order of the British Empire (OBE) ====
Military Division

Royal Navy/Royal Marines

- Brig David Mark Mortimer Evans.
- Lt Col Gary Edward Green.
- Cdr Lee Charles Hardy.
- Capt Michael John Hawthorne.
- Cdr (Acting Capt) Daniel Gordon Howard.
- Capt Richard Gordon Ingram.
- Cdr Ross Spooner.

Army

- Col David Desmond Casey. Late Corps of Royal Engineers
- Col Kristien Irwin Chafer. Late Army Air Corps
- Acting Col John Richard Collinge, ADC. Late Royal Regiment of Artillery.
- Col Martyn William Forgrave, QGM. Late The Mercian Regiment.
- Acting Col Ashley Raymond Fulford. Army Cadet Force
- Lt Col Michael Alexander Evanson-Goddard. The Royal Logistic Corps
- Lt Col Gavin Paul Hatcher. Corps of Royal Engineers
- Maj Albert Thomas Keeling, MBE. Royal Army Medical Corps.
- Lt Col Colette Kathleen MacDonald. Adjutant General's Corps (Educational and Training Services Branch)
- Lt Col Michael William Shervington. The Parachute Regiment
- Lt Col Dean Alexander Stevens. The Royal Logistic Corps
- Col Ian Tinsley. Late Royal Regiment of Artillery

Royal Air Force

- Wing Commander Daniel Beard
- Group Captain Philip Charles Berkeley Harding
- Group Captain Jeremy Dalton Holmes
- Wing Commander Paul Antony Kendall
- Wing Commander Andrew James Knight
- Wing Commander Rachel Louise Pudney
- Air Commodore Lincoln Scott Taylor

Civil Division

- Eugenie Rosemary Adams, Headteacher, Baskerville Special and Residential School, Birmingham. For services to Special Educational Needs and Disabilities.
- Sinclair Aitken. For services to Culture and to the community in Dundee.
- Damon Albarn, Singer-Songwriter, Composer, Musician and Producer. For services to Music.
- Fiona Margaret Alfred, executive director, Association of Women in Property. For services to Women in the Property and Construction Industry.
- Murdo Allan, Director of Health, Safety, Sustainability and Technical Training, UK Power Networks. For services to Skills in the Energy Industry.
- Alison Allden, lately Chief Executive, Higher Education Statistics Agency Limited. For services to Higher Education.
- Edgar Robin Allies, co-founder, Allies and Morrison. For services to Architecture.
- Geoffrey Wilfred Allister, executive director, Highway Term Maintenance Association. For services to Highway Engineering in Northern Ireland.
- Giles Edward Charles Andrews, Peer to Peer and Financial Inclusion Innovator. For services to Financial Services.
- Amanda Helen Ariss, lately Chief Executive, Diversity and Equality Forum. For services to Equality.
- Stephen John Ashby, lately Policy Adviser, International Plant Health, Department for Environment, Food and Rural Affairs. For services to Protecting Plant Health
- Roger Frederick Atkinson, assistant director, Counter-Avoidance, H.M. Revenue and Customs. For services to Taxpayers.
- John Ayres, Principal, Eden Multi-Academy Trust, Middlesex. For services to Education.
- Clive Blackmore Barda, Photographer. For services to Photography.
- Susan Barker, MBE, Sports Commentator. For services to Broadcasting and charity.
- Maree Lisette Barnett, Head of Emerging Infections, Department of Health. For services to Public Health.
- Dr William Barton, chief executive officer, WillB Consulting. For services to Innovation and Manufacturing.
- David Derek Bartram, Assistant Headteacher, Lampton School, Hounslow, London. For services to Special Educational Needs and Disabilities.
- Pamela Jane Baxter, deputy director, National Portrait Gallery. For services to the Arts.
- Juliana Beattie, Founder, The Art Room. For services to Education.
- Steuart John Rudolf Bedford, Conductor. For services to Music.
- Professor Jill Belch, Professor of Vascular Medicine, University of Dundee. For services to Medicine.
- William Sloan Bell, Head of Child Protection, Save the Children UK. For Humanitarian services to Children.
- Lester Benjamin, deputy director of Operations, Palace of Westminster. For parliamentary service.
- Ellen Frances Bennett, Senior Research and Teaching Fellow, Department of Social Policy and Intervention, University of Oxford. For services to Social Science.
- Judith Anne Bennett, lately Director, National Governors' Association and vice-chair of Governors, Chalgrove Community Primary School, Oxfordshire. For services to Education.
- Neil Richard Bentley, Head of Specialist Microbiology Technical Services, Public Health England. For services to Public Health.
- Evelynne Ann Berger, Primary Director, Harris Federation and Lead Adviser, London Challenge, Department for Education, H.M. Inspector of Schools. For services to Education.
- Lorraine Bewes, Chief Financial Officer, Chelsea and Westminster NHS Foundation Trust. For services to NHS Financial Management.
- Diane Margaret Birch, H.M. Inspector, Immigration Enforcement, Home Office. For services to the Care and Assistance of Homeless Foreign and European Economic Area Nationals.
- Dr Susan Elizabeth Black, Honorary Senior Research Associate in Computer Science, University College London. For services to Technology.
- Nigel Blackler, Head of Strategy, Enterprise and Environment, Cornwall Council. For services to Transport in Cornwall.
- Clare Emma Blampied, managing director, Sacla UK Ltd. For services to the Food Industry.
- Amanda Boyle, Founder and chief executive officer, Bloom VC. For services to Business.
- Simon Anthony Lee Brett, Author. For services to Literature.
- Martin Russell Bromiley, Founder, Clinical Human Factors Group. For services to Patient Safety.
- Christine Joyce Bromley, lately Senior Information Systems Service Delivery Manager, Land Registry. For services to Public Service IT and to charity.
- Lynn Brown, executive director, Financial Services, Glasgow City Council. For services to Local Government and charity.
- John Cameron, Head of Helplines, Child Protection Operations, NSPCC Helpline. For services to Child Protection.
- Alistair Colvin Campbell, Director, Bellair (Scotland) Ltd. For services to the Economy and Town Centre Regeneration.
- Dr Nicholas Capstick, chief executive officer, White Horse Federation. For services to Education.
- Hannah Ellis Carmichael. Trustee, Depaul UK. For services to Homeless and Vulnerable Young People.
- Dr Robert Leslie Caul. For services to Education and Sport in Northern Ireland.
- Lynn Anne Chesterman. Trustee and Chief Executive, Grandparents Plus. For services to Children and Families.
- Lynn Churchman, Founding Trustee, National Numeracy. For services to Maths and Numeracy Education.
- David Clarke, lately Treasurer, Police and Crime Commissioners for Warwickshire and West Mercia. For services to Policing Finance.
- Neil Henry Clephan, Headteacher, Roundhay School, Leeds. For services to Education.
- Elaine Mary Colquhoun, Executive Principal, Academy Trust, Walthamstow, London. For services to Education.
- Anne Marie Connolly, chair, Northern Ireland Policing Board. For services to Policing and Education in Northern Ireland.
- Sally Elizabeth Cooke. For services to Further Education, Accessibility and Inclusion.
- Dr Adrienne Cooper, Strategic Director, Adult Social Services, Housing and Health, Sutton Borough Council. For services to Adult Social Services.
- Andrew James Corcoran, lately Senior Executive Of cer, Ministry of Defence. For services in Support of Military Operations.
- Professor David Anthony Cowan, Professor of Pharmaceutical Toxicology and Director, Drug Control Centre, King's College London. For services to Anti-Doping Science.
- Mark Edwin Crabtree, Grade 7, Ministry of Defence. For services to the Defence Asset Management Programme.
- Terence Martin Cross, chairman, Delta Print and Packaging. For services to the Economy and voluntary service to the community in Northern Ireland.
- Timothy Cullen, Head, Local Growth Communication and Engagement, Department for Business, Innovation and Skills. For services to the Life Sciences Sector.
- Rachael Helen Cummings, Senior Humanitarian Health Adviser, Save the Children UK. For services to Emergency Health Crises Abroad.
- Professor Margaret Jane Dallman, Associate Provost (Academic Partnerships), Imperial College London. For services to Bioscience.
- James Trevor Dannatt. For services to Architecture and Architectural Education.
- Malgwyn Davies. Chair, St David's Hospice Care, Newport. For voluntary service to Palliative Care and for services to the community in South East Wales and Powys.
- Edward Philip Julian Davis, Adviser, Department for International Development. For services to the Ebola Crisis Response in West Africa.
- Charles Ian Paul Denyer, MVO, Deputy Clerk of the Crown in Chancery, Crown Office, Ministry of Justice. For services to Constitutional and Ceremonial Administration.
- Simon Devonshire, Entrepreneur. For services to Enterprise, Enterprise Promotion and Humanitarian Issues.
- Helen Dickinson. Chief Executive, British Retail Consortium. For services to the Retail Industry.
- Professor William Donachie. For services to Animal and Veterinary Biosciences.
- Benjamin Donaldson, Ministry of Defence. For services to Defence.
- Terence Thomas Robin Douglas, Chair of Trustees, The Who Cares? Trust, London. For services to Children and Young People.
- James Dunbar, Founder and Chief Executive, New Start Highland. For services to Economic and Community Development in the Highlands and Islands.
- Tania Eagle, Programme Director, Association of Police and Crime Commissioners, London. For services to Policing.
- Leslie Charles East, lately Chief Executive, Associated Board of the Royal Schools of Music. For services to Musicians and Music Education.
- Celia Ann Malcolm Edey, Non-Executive Director, University Campus Suffolk. For services to Higher Education and the community in Essex and Suffolk.
- Shaun Edgerley, Adviser, CHASE Operations Team. For services to the Ebola Crisis Response in West Africa.
- Professor William John Edmunds, Professor, London School of Hygiene and Tropical Medicine. For services to Infectious Disease Control particularly the Ebola Crisis Response in West Africa.
- Stephen Paul Edwards, Senior Project Manager, Manchester, H.M. Revenue and Customs. For services to Public Sector Change Programmes.
- Idrissa Akuna Elba, Actor. For services to Drama.
- David Philip Ereira, chairman, Insolvency Service and Vice Chairman of Trustees, Marie Curie. For services to the Insolvency Regime and to Charity.
- Councillor Tudor Evans, Leader, Plymouth City Council. For political service and services to Local Government.
- Dr Josephine Farrar, Chief Executive, Bath and North East Somerset Council. For services to Local Government.
- Councillor Peter Fleming, Leader, Sevenoaks District Council and lately chairman, Improvement and Innovation Board, Local Government Association. For services to Local Government.
- (Betty) Ann Flintham, Magistrate and lately Deputy Chief Executive, Magistrates' Association. For services to the Administration of Justice.
- Katherine Foster, Senior Humanitarian Adviser, Department for International Development. For services in to the Ebola Crisis Response in West Africa.
- Alan William Frame, Head of Customer Management, H.M. Passport Office. For services to Public Administration.
- Christopher Clive Froome, Professional Road Racing Cyclist. For services to Cycling.
- Georgette Fulton. For services to Care of Police Survivors, St Andrew's First Aid and the community in New Cumnock, Ayrshire.
- Alan Gemmell – Director of the British Council in Israel for services to Arts and Science
- Dr John Calum MacDonald Gillies, lately chairman, Royal College of General Practitioners Scotland. For services to General Practice.
- Dr Christine Alexandra Goodall, Senior Clinical Lecturer, University of Glasgow and co-founder, Medics Against Violence. For services to Violence Prevention and Victims of Crime.
- Sarah Louisa Goodall, deputy director, National Crime Agency. For services to Law Enforcement.
- Benjamin Charles Goss, chairman, Give Them a Sporting Chance and Founder, The Chaffinch Trust. For services to People with Disabilities and Disadvantaged People in the UK and Abroad.
- Nicola Ann Gott, Founder and Director, SHE'S GOTT IT. For services to Women into Business and Female Entrepreneurship in the North East.
- Stephen Groves, National Head of Preparedness, Resilience and Response, NHS England. For services to Public Health.
- Piers Inigo Haggard. For services to Film, Television and Theatre.
- Andrew Haines, Chief Executive, Civil Aviation Authority. For services to Transport.
- Dr Jennifer Margaret Harries, Director, South of England, Public Health England. For services to Public Health.
- Jeffrey Martin Hart, lately Head, Dangerous Goods Division, Department for Transport. For services to Transport.
- Dr Roger John Head. For services to charity and to the community in Gloucestershire.
- Ann Hebden, lately Ministry of Defence. For services to Defence.
- Karen Henning, Ministry of Defence. For services to Defence.
- Catherine Mary Hill, Deputy Principal, Blackpool and The Fylde College. For services to Further Education.
- Robert Holt. For services to Disabled and Disadvantaged People in the UK and Abroad.
- Professor Maurice Howard, Professor of Art History, University of Sussex. For services to Higher Education and Architectural Heritage.
- Robert Ellis Howden, President, British Cycling. For services to Cycling.
- Professor Amanda Caroline Howe, Professor of Primary Care, University of East Anglia and President-Elect, World Organisation of Family Doctors (WONCA). For services to Primary Care.
- Gay Huey Evans, Financial Services and Regulatory Expert. For services to Financial Services and Diversity.
- Grace Jackson, Sierra Leone Programme Manager, Department for International Development. For services to the Ebola Crisis Response in West Africa.
- Pauline Andrea Jarvis, CCTV Evidence Investigator, Nottinghamshire Police. For services to Policing and Major Crime Investigations.
- Councillor Peter Charles John, Leader, Southwark Council. For political service and services to Local Government.
- Dr Helen Mary Jones, Headteacher, Beacon Hill School and Business and Enterprise College, Tyne and Wear. For services to Children with Special Educational Needs and Disabilities.
- Wayne Jones, chief executive officer, MAN PrimeServ Diesel. For services to the North West and Supporting Young People.
- David Robert Jordan, lately executive director of Operations, Environment Agency. For services to the Environment and International Environmental Protection.
- Ruth Kaufman. For services to Operational Research.
- Rosaleen Clare Kerslake, Chief Executive, The Prince's Regeneration Trust. For services to British Heritage.
- Edmund King, President, the Automobile Association. For services to Road Safety.
- Carolyn Kirby, President, Mental Health Review Tribunal for Wales and chairman, Cancer Information Support Services, South West Wales. For services to Justice and Cancer Care.
- Judith Kirkland, chief executive officer, Business Enterprise Support Ltd. For services to Business and Enterprise in Staffordshire.
- Dr Emrys Kirkman, Principal Scientist, Physiology, Defence Science and Technology Laboratory. For services in Support of Military Medical Treatment.
- Bernadette Knill, lately Headteacher, Priory Woods Special School, Middlesbrough. For services to Children with Special Educational Needs.
- Richard Ladd-Jones, Grade 6, Ministry of Defence. For services in support of Defence Policy and Operations.
- Daljit Lally, Deputy Chief Executive, Northumberland County Council and Joint Executive Director, Northumbria Healthcare NHS Foundation Trust. For services to Integrated Care.
- Clive Lawton. For services to the Jewish Community particularly through Limmud UK.
- Marion Naomi Little, Campaign Specialist, Conservative Party. For political service.
- Paulette Long. For services to the Music Industry.
- Trevor Anthony Long, lately Chief Enforcement Officer, Northern Ireland Courts and Tribunals Service, Northern Ireland Executive. For services to Law Enforcement and voluntary service to Young People.
- Jennifer Jane Lonsdale, Director, Environmental Investigation Agency. For services to the Environment particularly Whales and Dolphins Protection.
- Professor Nancy Adaline Loucks, Chief Executive, Families Outside and visiting professor, University of Strathclyde Centre. For Law, Crime and Justice for services to Education and Human Rights.
- Norman MacDonald, QGM, lately Ministry of Defence. For services to Defence.
- Roderick MacDonald. For services to Consultancy and Engineering.
- Dr Daniel Stuart Martin, Critical Care Director, Royal Free London NHS Foundation Trust. For services to the Prevention of Infectious Diseases.
- Maureen Martin, Headteacher, Coloma Convent Girls' School, Croydon. For services to Education.
- Malcolm Martineau, Pianist. For services to Music and Young Singers.
- Gerard Anthony Mason, chief executive officer, Morson Group. For services to Engineering and Design.
- Philip Steven Mason, Senior Anti-Corruption Adviser, Department for International Development. For services to International Anti-Corruption Policy.
- Michael John May, Founder and chief executive officer, Blue Sky Development and Regeneration. For services to Ex-Offenders.
- Professor Irene (Helen) McAara-McWilliam, Head, School of Design and Director, Design Innovation, Glasgow School of Art. For services to Art and Design.
- Brian McCarthy, Strategic Relationship Manager, Innovate UK. For services to Business and Innovation.
- William Bruce McLernon. For services to Social Care and Local Government particularly in Carmarthenshire.
- Gerard Arthur Damien McQuillan, MBE, lately Senior Adviser, Acquisitions, Exports, Loans and Collections, Acceptance in Lieu Scheme, Arts Council England. For services to Public Arts Collections.
- Professor Susan McVie, FRSE, Professor of Quantitative Criminology, University of Edinburgh and Director, Applied Quantitative Methods Network in Scotland. For services to Social Sciences.
- Peter Mileham, DL. For services to the community in Lancashire.
- Michelle Mitchell, Chief Executive, Multiple Sclerosis Society, For services to Older People and the Voluntary Sector
- Pauline Monaghan, Chief Executive, the Rise Trust, Chippenham. For services to Children and Families.
- John Thomas (Sean) Moore, Co-ordinator, UK Fire Service Urban Search and Rescue. For services to Search and Rescue in the UK and Abroad.
- Malcolm Morley, Chief Executive, Harlow Council. For services to Local Government.
- Graham Morrison – for services to Architecture.
- Dr Norman Cecil Morrow, co-founder, Allies and Morrison. For services to the Pharmaceutical Profession in Northern Ireland.
- Dr Patricia Jane Mucavele, Head of Nutrition, Children's Food Trust Charity. For services to Children and Families and to charity.
- Jonathan Andrew Macfie Muirhead, DL, chairman, Scottish Leather Group. For services to the Leather Industry.
- Kevin Leslie Murphy, lately chair, Excel London. For services to Business Tourism.
- Christopher Lennox Napier, chair, Hampshire Branch, Campaign to Protect Rural England. For services to the Environment and the Rural Community in Southern England.
- Rajender Nayyar, Policy Adviser, London, H.M. Revenue and Customs. For services to Tax Policy.
- William James Nesbitt. For services to Drama and to the community in Northern Ireland.
- Terry Michael Neville, Chief Operating Officer, University of Northampton. For services to Higher Education.
- Professor Helen Margaret Odell-Miller, Professor of Music Therapy and Director, Music Therapy Research Centre, Anglia Ruskin University. For services to Music Therapy.
- Keith Alistair Oliver, lately Head of Maritime Operations, Maritime and Coastguard Agency. For services to Maritime Safety.
- Anne O'Reilly, lately Manager, Women's Aid Federation Northern Ireland. For services to Older People and the Voluntary Sector in Northern Ireland.
- Ronald Antonio O'Sullivan, Professional Snooker Player. For services to Snooker.
- Marc Russell Owen, Director, Border Force, Heathrow. For services to Border Security and Immigration Policy Development.
- Paul William Owen, lately Chief Executive, British Canoe Union. For services to Canoeing.
- David Oyelowo, Actor. For services to Drama.
- Helen Samantha Parrett, Principal, Bromley College of Further and Higher Education. For services to Further Education.
- Kala Patel, managing director, Kiddycare Limited (Nurseries). For services to the Childcare Business.
- Dr Martin Julian Pearce, Fellow, Defence Science and Technology Laboratory. For services in Support of Military Operations.
- Sally Peck. For services to the community through Education and Sport in Bedford and the Eastern Region.
- Daniel Peltz. For philanthropic and charitable services.
- Lynne Alison Pepper, Headteacher, Herringthorpe Infants School, Rotherham, and Enterprise Champion. For services to Education.
- Professor Alison Jean Petch, lately Director, Institute for Research and Innovation in Social Sciences. For services to Social Services in Scotland.
- Susan Patricia Pettigrew, Director, St. Michael's Fellowship, London. For services to Children and Families.
- Ian William Pigott, Farmer and Founder, Open Farm Sunday and chairman, Farming and Countryside Education. For services to Agricultural and Countryside Education.
- Carolyn Mary Elizabeth Pike, Director of Legal Services, University of Birmingham. For services to Higher Education and Legal Services.
- Dr Spencer Simpson Pitfield, Volunteer, Conservative Party. For political service.
- John William Raine, Head, Port Loko District Ebola Response Centre, Sierra Leone. For services to the Ebola Crisis Response in West Africa.
- Prathibha Ramsingh, District Operations Manager, Work Services Directorate, Department for Work and Pensions. For services to Jobseekers and Employer Engagement in London.
- Janet Rees, co-founder, Foster Care Associates and Non-Executive Director, Core Assets Group. For services to Children and Families.
- Helen Richards, District Adviser, CHASE Operations Team, Kambia District Ebola Response Centre, Sierra Leone. For services to the Ebola Crisis Response in West Africa.
- Colonel Timothy Stewart Richmond, MBE, TD, DL. For services to Reserve Forces' and Cadets' Associations and the community in Nottinghamshire.
- Councillor John Robert Riddle, chairman, Northumberland National Park. For services to the community, Environment, and Business in Northumberland.
- Susan Margaret Riley, District Manager, Merseyside Jobcentre Plus. For public service.
- Dr Gillian Margaret Ring, Grade 6, Ministry of Defence. For services to the Ebola Crisis Response in West Africa.
- Professor Ronald James Ritchie, Chair of Board, Cabot Learning Federation Academies Trust and lately Pro Vice-Chancellor, University of the West of England. For services to Education.
- Paul David Roberts, Chief Executive, LGBT Consortium. For services to Lesbian, Gay, Bisexual and Transgender Communities.
- Gillian Robinson, Executive Headteacher, Castle Hill School, Huddersfield. For services to Children with Special Educational Needs and Disabilities.
- Michael George Robson, District Adviser, CHASE Operations Team, Port Loko, Sierra Leone. For services to the Ebola Crisis Response in West Africa.
- Peter Michael Rogers, JP, Director of Operations and Quality, 4Children, and for services to Scouting. For services to Children and Families and voluntary service to Young People.
- Jeanette Rosa Rosenberg, Head, Sensitive Casework Team, Export Control Organisation and chair, Disability Advisory Group, Department for Business, Innovation and Skills. For services to the Civil Service Disability Network.
- The Reverend Professor Kenneth Rankin Ross, chair, Scotland Malawi Partnership. For services to the community in Malawi and to Scottish-Malawi Relations.
- Jacqueline Mary Rowell, Network Manager, Universal Credit Operations Directorate, Department for Work and Pensions. For services to Public Administration.
- Robin Rowland, Chief Executive, YO! Sushi. For services to the Restaurant and Hospitality Industry.
- Professor Nichola Jane Katharine Rumsey, Professor of Appearance Psychology, University of the West of England. For services to People Affected by an Altered Appearance.
- Catherine Mary Sabin, President, Lawn Tennis Association. For services to Tennis.
- Sandra Samuels, Councillor, Wolverhampton City Council. For political service and services to Local Government.
- Jane Thursa Sanderson, Chief Executive, Drake Music Scotland. For services to Music Education and People with Disabilities.
- Susannah Claire Schofield. For services to Small Businesses, Young People and Women in Business.
- Professor William Scott, lately Chief Pharmaceutical Officer, Scottish Government. For services to Healthcare.
- Sally Ann Sealey, Grade 7, Integration and Faith Directorate, Department for Communities and Local Government. For services to Interfaith Relations and Holocaust Remembrance.
- Philip David Shadbolt, managing director, Zeta Specialist Lighting Ltd. For services to Business and Innovation.
- Dr Oliver John Shanley, executive director, Quality and Safety, Hertfordshire Partnership University NHS Foundation Trust. For services to Mental Health and Disabilities Nursing.
- Dr Emily Fleur Shuckburgh. For services to Science and Public Communication of Science.
- Professor David Sigsworth, lately chairman, Scottish Environment Protection Agency. For services to the Environment and Sustainable Futures.
- Gurmukh Singh, Patron, Khalsa Aid. For services to Community Cohesion and charity.
- Danielle Skelley, Director, Asset Management, Transport for London. For services to Transport in the UK.
- Paul Anthony Smith. For charitable services.
- Professor Stephen William Smye, Theme Lead, National Institute for Health Research, Clinical Research Network. For services to Healthcare Research.
- Colonel Carron Edward Mordaunt Snagge, Chief Executive, Reserve Forces and Cadets Association, Yorkshire and the Humber. For services to the Reserves and Cadets.
- Lesley Spuhler, Chief Executive, Foundation of Light. For services to Education and Improving Lives in the North East.
- Jessica Macdonald Steele, Director, Jericho Road Solutions. For services to Community Assets in the UK.
- Giselle Elizabeth Stewart. For services to the Computer Games Industry in the North East.
- Sarah Lesley Stewart, Chief Executive, NewcastleGateshead Initiative. For services to the Economy in the North East.
- Annabel Margaret, Lady Stilgoe, JP. For charitable services.
- Patricia Helen Ann Straughen. For services to charity and Cancer Care in the North East of Scotland.
- Heather Patricia Strawbridge, chair, South Western Ambulance Service NHS Foundation Trust. For services to Health and Care.
- Professor John Phillip Sumpter, Professor of Ecotoxicology and Head, Institute for the Environment, Brunel University. For services to the Science of Ecotoxicology in the Aquatic Environment.
- Professor Kathleen Elizabeth Tanner, Professor of Biomedical Materials, University of Glasgow. For services to Biomedical Engineering.
- Paul Tennant, chief executive officer, Orbit. For services to Housing.
- Ian Thornley, Non-Executive Director, Remploy Ltd. For services to disabled people.
- Charles Basil Tilley, chief executive officer, Chartered Institute of Management Accountants. For services to the Economy.
- Dr Nicholas Roden Todd, Inspector, Education and Training Inspectorate, Department of Education, Northern Ireland Executive. For services to Education in Northern Ireland.
- Jane Tomkinson, Chief Executive, Liverpool Heart and Chest Hospital NHS Foundation Trust. For services to NHS Financial Management.
- Councillor Katharine Tracey, Cabinet Member for Education and Children's Services, Wandsworth Borough Council. For services to Local Government.
- Dr Alan Turnbull, FRS, Senior Fellow, Electrochemistry and Corrosion, National Physical Laboratory. For services to Science and Industry.
- Professor Meena Upadhyaya. For services to Medical Genetics and the Welsh Asian community.
- Joanna Van Heyningen. For services to Architecture and the Built Environment.
- John Christian Varley, TD. Estate Director, Clinton Devon Estates. For services to Agriculture, the Environment and the Rural Community.
- Cedric Philip Wake, Chief Executive, Nautical Institute. For services to the Maritime Industry.
- Councillor Keith Ivor Wakefield, lately Leader, Leeds City Council. For political service and services to Local Government.
- Professor Annalu Waller, chair, Human Communication Technologies, University of Dundee. For services to people with Complex Communication Needs.
- Richard John Ward, Head of Offender Learning, Department for Business, Innovation and Skills. For services to Adult Education.
- Andrew Ronald Watson, Detective Sergeant, Thames Valley Police. For services to Policing and Counter Terrorism.
- Richard Wentworth Watson, Founder and Director, Energise Sussex Coast. For services to the community in Sussex.
- Councillor John Keith Weighell, lately Leader, North Yorkshire County Council. For services to Local Government.
- Michael Arthur Welch, Founder, Blackcircles.com. For services to Business and voluntary service to Adoption and Fostering.
- Christine Ann Wellington, MBE, former Triathlete, and Ironman World Champion. For services to Sport and charity.
- Angela White, Chief Executive, Sefton Council for Voluntary Service. For services to Community Action.
- Professor Paul Ellis White, DL, lately Deputy Vice-Chancellor, University of Sheffield. For services to Higher Education.
- Michael John Whitehouse, Chief Operating Officer, National Audit Office. For services to Public Sector Audit.
- Gary John Wilder, Executive Headteacher, Furze Warren Hard Federation, Romford. For services to Education.
- Antonia Katharine Williams, lately Deputy Head, Policy Unit, Prime Minister's Office. For public service.
- Gareth James Williams. For public and voluntary service in Wales.
- Peter Bryan Gurmin Williams. For services to Poverty Reduction particularly through the Trust for London.
- Venessa Willms, Director of Primary Education, ARK Schools. For services to Education.
- Dr Alan Roy Willson, lately Director, the 1000 Lives Improvement Service, Public Health Wales. For services to the Quality and Safety of Healthcare in Wales.
- Denise Wilson, chief executive officer, Lord Davies' Steering Group. For services to Women and Equality.
- Godfrey James Worsdale, lately Director and Chief Executive, Baltic Centre for Contemporary Art. For services to Visual Arts in the North East.
- Janetta Wray (Janetta Hunter), Director, Housing Rights Service. For services to the community in Northern Ireland.
- Anita Zabludowicz, Philanthropist. For services to the Arts.

==== Member of the Order of the British Empire (MBE) ====
Military Division

Royal Navy/Royal Marines

- WO Class 1 Warfare Specialist (Abovewater Warfare Tactical) Mark Alan Barker.
- Lt Cdr Martin John Collis.
- Lt Cdr Martin John Ford AFC
- Lt Cdr (Acting Cdr) Christopher Stephen Franks.
- Lt Col (now Col) Graeme William Fraser.
- WO Class 1 Joseph John Gillespie.
- Lt Cdr David James Joyce.
- WO Class 1 Logistics (Catering Services) Trevor Llewellyn.
- Cdr Alan James MacKie RNR Combined Cadet Force
- Lt Cdr Paul Allan Thomson.
- Lt Cdr Samantha Truelove.
- WO Class 1 Engineering Technician (Marine Engineering) Thomas Ward.
- CPO Medical Assistant Marc Alan Wilkins.

Army

- Maj Lucy Theresa Anderson. The Royal Logistic Corps.
- Maj Christopher Richard Ankers. Corps of Royal Engineers.
- Maj Peter William Stanhope Baines. The Rifles.
- Maj Sarah Ann Ballantyne. Adjutant General's Corps (Royal Military Police).
- WO Class 1 Gary Binks. The Royal Logistic Corps Army Reserve.
- Maj Mark William Brett. Royal Regiment of Artillery.
- Capt Wayne Keith Burnard. Corps of Royal Electrical and Mechanical Engineers.
- Capt Andrew Butcher. Grenadier Guards.
- Capt Graeme Campbell. Royal Corps of Signals.
- Maj Benedict Edward Casson. The Rifles.
- Maj Roy John Conyer. Royal Logistic Corps.
- Capt Roderick Duncan Cowan. Royal Corps of Signals Army Reserve.
- Maj Verity Jayne Crompton. Royal Logistic Corps.
- Maj Robert Peter Cutler. The Rifles.
- Maj Karl Dawson. Welsh Guards.
- Colour Sgt Robert Edward Delamar. The Duke of Lancaster's Regiment.
- Maj David James Dray. Adjutant General's Corps (Royal Military Police).
- WO Class 2 Michelle Howe-Ellis. The Royal Logistic Corps.
- Chaplain to the Forces 3rd Class Reverend James Francis. Royal Army Chaplains' Department.
- Maj Robert Bruce Frost. Corps of Royal Engineers.
- Colour Sgt Colin George Graham. The Royal Regiment of Scotland Army Reserve.
- Maj Alan Trigg Grant. The Royal Regiment of Scotland.
- Acting Capt Susan Elizabeth Karran. Army Cadet Force.
- Capt Francisco Savvaki Kyriakou. Adjutant General's Corps (Royal Military Police) Army Reserve.
- Maj Owain David Luke. The Royal Welsh.
- Maj Sean David Matten. Corps of Royal Engineers.
- Cpl Carl Martin McAvoy. The Rifles.
- Lt Col Neil Patrick Morgan. Corps of Army Music.
- Maj Phillip Charles Moxey. The Royal Anglian Regiment.
- Capt Naveed Muhammad. Royal Corps of Signals Army Reserve.
- Maj Jonathan Roger Oates. Royal Regiment of Artillery.
- WO Class 2 Hitesh Oza. The Royal Yeomanry Army Reserve.
- Maj Timothy William Joe Pittaway. Army Air Corps.
- Lt Col Kieron Michael Potts. The Royal Regiment of Scotland.
- Capt Stephen Anthony Robinson. The Royal Logistic Corps Army Reserve.
- Maj John Grant Sheerin QGM. The Parachute Regiment.
- Maj Mark Steven Spencer. Corps of Royal Electrical and Mechanical Engineers.
- Maj John Duncan Sullivan. The Parachute Regiment.
- Maj Anna Claire Swales. The Royal Logistic Corps.
- WO Class 1 Simon Shane Sykes. Corps of Royal Electrical and Mechanical Engineers.
- Maj Adrian Richard Thompson. The Mercian Regiment.
- Maj Alasdair Edmond John Wills. General List Army Reserve.
- Maj Andrew Albert Wood. The Rifles.

Royal Air Force

- Squadron Leader Timothy Peter Carter
- Squadron Leader Duncan John Clarke
- Warrant Officer Mark Christopher Cunningham
- Squadron Leader Paul Barry Davis
- Flight Lieutenant Thomas Edward Dunlop
- Squadron Leader Timothy James Robert Ellis
- Warrant Officer Elisha Marie Evans
- Sergeant Adam John Foster
- Squadron Leader Martin Rhoderick Humphrey
- Squadron Leader Alexandra Louise Hyatt
- Warrant Officer Clive Alan Martland
- Squadron Leader Sarah Louise Maskell
- Master Aircrew David Ian Neale

Civil Division

- Stephen Thomas Richard Absalom. For services to the community and to the Environment in Neath Port Talbot.
- David William Acheson. For services to the Families of Police Officers and to charity.
- Peter Robin Adams. For voluntary services to the Conservation of Flora and Fauna in South West Essex and East London.
- Fayyaz Ahmed. For services to Interfaith and Community Cohesion in Preston.
- Zlakha Ahmed. For services to Women's Rights and Community Cohesion in Rotherham, South Yorkshire.
- Christopher Phillip Aitken. For services to Defence.
- Rula Al-Adasani. For charitable services.
- Barbara Mary Anderson. For services to Education.
- Yvonne Janet Anderson. For services to the Special Olympics.
- Catherine Arlidge. For services to Music Education.
- Julie Catherine Armstrong. For services to Defence.
- Jacqueline Arnold. For services to the Economy in Cumbria.
- Kim Arrowsmith. For services to Children and Families.
- Ian Michael Ashbolt. For services to the community in Cheshire and Staffordshire.
- (Ahmed Jamal) Nasir Awan. For services to Business and International Trade.
- Hedy-Joy Babani. For charitable services to Disabled and Disadvantaged Children.
- Christine Judith Bailey. For services to the community in Cheshire.
- John Leonard Hawthorne Bailey. For services to the community in Wellingborough, Northamptonshire.
- Marc Bailey. For services to Business and International Trade.
- James Milne Banks. For services to Bagpiping and voluntary service in Scotland.
- Patricia Margaret Blackett Barber. For services to Armed Forces Heritage.
- Beverley Barclay. For services to Nursing, particularly Young Adults with Life-Limiting Conditions.
- Jonathan Haveloch Barden. For Humanitarian services to the Ebola Crisis Response in West Africa particularly through UK-Med.
- Jacqueline Anne Barnett. For services to Children and Families.
- John Barrowman. For services to the Manufacturing Industry.
- David Anthony John Bartlett. For services to Children and Young People in the North East.
- Maralyn Barton-Kronman. For services to the Performing Arts.
- Robert Charles Bass. For services to Education.
- Linda Ann Bateman. For public service and services to the Supportive Treatment of Migrants in the UK.
- George Robert Batts. For voluntary service to Veterans.
- Carolyn Baxendale. For services to Music and the community in Bolton.
- Helen Baynham. For services to Pre-school Education.
- Ian Alexander Moore Beattie. For services to charity and to the community in Bristol.
- Ian Hugh Beggs. For services to Rugby.
- Felicity Belfield. For services to Supporting Musicians and Dancers.
- Clifford Alan Bennett. For services to Children and Families.
- Jacqueline Bennett. For services to Children and Families.
- Margherita Joan Biller. For services to Mathematics in Further Education.
- Mervyn John Bishop. For services to Victim Support and to Young People in East and North Yorkshire.
- David Anthony Blackiston. For services to Major Incident Administration.
- Colin Blair. For services to Higher Education and the community in Huddersfield.
- Dr Nisreen Hanna Booya. For services to Healthcare particularly Mental Health.
- Patrick Borer. For services to Architecture.
- Anthony Robert William Bostock. For services to Angling and the Environment in the River Severn Catchment Area.
- Ailsa Margaret Bosworth. For services to People with Rheumatoid Arthritis.
- Carol Mary Bottomley. For services to Education and voluntary service to Sport in Darlington.
- Robert Edward Brain. For charitable services to the community in Nelson, Caerphilly.
- Terence Donald Bravin. For voluntary and charitable services to Young People in South West Wales.
- Dolores Bray-Ash. For services to Children and Families.
- Rebecca Bright. For services to App Development for People with Communication Difficulties.
- Damian John Broughton. For services to Small Businesses and Sole Traders and to the community in Lancashire.
- Helen Broughton. For services to Small Businesses and Sole Traders and to the community in Lancashire.
- Susan Mary Broughton. For services to Children with Special Educational Needs.
- Marion Denise Brown. For services to the community in Hertfordshire.
- Sandra Ann Brown. For services to Culture and the community in Bridport, Dorset.
- Timothy John Brown. For services to Business and Apprenticeships and charitable services in Southern England.
- Jeffrey Brownhut. For services to the Leisure and Tourism Industry in Northern Ireland.
- Roger David Bucknall. For services to Guitar Making, Music and Heritage Crafts.
- David Barlow Buik. For services to Financial Services.
- Barry Bullas. For services to Public Administration and charity.
- Anthony Frederick Burgess. For services to Higher Education Governance and Fundraising.
- Janet Burns. For services for the Promotion of Dignity in Care for All.
- Jane Lee Burt. For voluntary service to Carers and Criminal Justice.
- Sinead Butters. For services to Housing.
- Rita Byrne. For services to Education.
- Jo-Ann Clare Cahill. For services to Young People in Swansea.
- John Joseph Callaghan. For services to Partnership Working in Healthcare.
- James Ebenezer Callander. For voluntary service to Athletics.
- Mary Elizabeth Cameron. For services to the community in Northern Ireland.
- Patricia Agnes Campfield. For charitable services to the community in Southend-on-Sea.
- Professor Robert Carachi. For services to Medicine.
- Dr Reginald Carr. For services to the community in Blyth, Northumberland.
- Anthony Emoabino Chaba. For services to Minority Ethnic Communities in Manchester.
- Ray Chapman. For services to Maritime Safety.
- Stuart Chapman. For services to Tenants in Walsall, West Midlands.
- Colonel Michael Stewart Cheetham. For services to the community in Derbyshire.
- Paul Anthony Chubb. For services to Career Education and Guidance.
- Aftab Ahmed Chughtai. For services to Business and Community Relations in Birmingham.
- Dorothy Mary Clark. For services to the community in Greatham Village, Co. Durham.
- Trevor Martin Clarke. For services to Disabled and Disadvantaged People through Outdoor Education.
- Ian Christopher Clayton. For services to Education.
- John Clemson. For services to Music in Birmingham.
- Jane Collier. For voluntary service to First Aid through St John Ambulance.
- Anne Conlon. For services to Musical Education and Conservation in the UK and Abroad.
- Delinda Virginia Conlon. For services to Science and Science Education in North East England.
- Gregory Martin Cook. For political service.
- Kevin Andrew Courtie. For services to Preventing Tax Evasion and to the Scottish Fishing Industry.
- David Matthew Cowell. For services to Vocational Education.
- Ronald Morton Crank. For services to the Business Community in London and the South East.
- Kathleen Elizabeth Crawford. For services to Education.
- Roy Croasdaile. For services to Law and Order in London.
- Lady Rose Maureen Crossman. For voluntary service to Maritime Safety.
- Mark Cueto. For services to Rugby Union.
- Angus Howard Cundey. For services to the Bespoke Tailoring Trade and Tailors Charities.
- Dr Colin Currie. For services to the Management of Hip Fractures in Older People.
- Richard Malcolm Dale. For services to the Maritime Industry.
- David John Davies. For voluntary service to Reserve Forces and Cadets in Yorkshire and the Humber.
- Lawrence Frederick Davies. For services to the Automotive Industry and to the community in Bedfordshire.
- Philippa Davies. For services to Nursing.
- Jane Sarah Prosser Davies-Slowik. For services to Improving Oral Health of Disadvantaged People
- Stacey Serene Davis. For services to Law and Order particularly Equality and Diversity.
- Stella Barbara Dean. For voluntary services to the Fishing Community in Hampshire, Dorset and the Isle of Wight.
- Kathleen Carroll Derbyshire. For services to the community in Preston, Lancashire.
- Edwin John Derriman. For services to Marine Conservation
- Avril Mary Devaney. For services to Nursing of People with Mental Health Problems.
- Mary Christine Devine. For voluntary services to the community in Castlemilk, Glasgow.
- Maurice John Devine. For services to the Nursing Profession and the Field of Learning Disabilities.
- Hilary Dobbie. For services to Children with Special Educational Needs and Disabilities.
- Maurice Bruce Dodd. For voluntary service to the Scottish Fire and Rescue Service in the North East of Scotland.
- Roger Jolyon David Dodgson. For services to Music and to the Rural Community in Cumbria.
- Claire Doherty. For services to the Arts in South West England.
- Brian James Doick. For services to the Park Home Industry.
- Henry Donn. For services to the community in Manchester.
- Shirley Nadine Dooley. For services to the Immigration System.
- Francis Joseph Doran. For services to the community in Liverpool.
- John Forrest Youden Duffy. For services to charity and the community in Southport, Merseyside.
- Janice Carol Eaglesham. For services to Disability Sport.
- Sallie Jane Eastick. For services to Families with Children with Severe and Life Limiting Disabilities.
- Brian Robert Edwards. For services to Local Government.
- Edwina Mary Edwards. For services to the community in Derbyshire.
- Michael Bernard Elkerton. For services to People with Disabilities and to charity in North West England.
- Reverend Paul Anthony Epton. For services to the community and Building Regeneration in Birkenhead, Merseyside.
- Ian Eva. For services to Vocational Education.
- Anne-Marie Evans. For services to Botanical Art and Education.
- Stephen Mark Evans. For services to First Response and voluntary service to Young People.
- Peter Gregory Eversden. For services to community engagement in planning for London
- Cmde William David Murray Fairbairn. For services to Young People.
- Jeremy Paul Farrell. For services to Education.
- Roger Arnold Fennemore. For services to Sport.
- Christopher Mark Fenwick. For political service.
- Julie Flaherty. For services to Paediatric Nursing in Greater Manchester.
- Roger William Flitcroft. For services to Scouting, the Samaritans and the Freemasons.
- Ann Marie Forbes. For services to Education in the UK and Uganda.
- Ian Forbes. For voluntary service to the RUCGC Foundation.
- Professor Alfred Paul Forster. For services to Patients with Prostate Cancer.
- John Fothergill. For services to Immigration and Border Management.
- (Cyril) Jeffrey Fox. For services to the Association of Jewish Ex-Servicemen and charitable service.
- Carl Frampton. For services to Boxing.
- Vivian June Isoult French. For services to Literature, Literacy, Illustration and the Arts.
- Elizabeth Susan Friend. For public service and for voluntary service to the community in Sheffield.
- Dr Rachel Jane Furley. For services to Sick and Disabled Children in the UK and Belarus.
- The Honourable Heather Margaret Anne Galloway Galbraith. For services to Equestrianism in Ayrshire.
- Pamela Bruce Gallant. For services to People with Special Needs in Aberdeen particularly through Sport.
- Shaun Gettings. For services to Prisoners.
- Lawrence Gibbons. For services to Law Enforcement particularly Tackling the Illegal Drugs Trade.
- Kathleen Philomena Gilbert. For services to Children and Families.
- Philip John Gilbert. For services to Children and Families.
- Deborah Glover. For services to Nursing and Nursing Journalism.
- Rita Ann Gooch. For services to Law Enforcement.
- Keith Edward Goodger. For services to The Air Training Corps and to the community in Hampton, Middlesex.
- Rosalind Diane Elizabeth Gordon. For services to Public Administration.
- Linda June Gorn. For services to the Economy in Banffshire.
- Donald Edward Graham. For services to Vocational Training for Young Adults with Learning Disabilities.
- Jeremy Clayton Grammer RD. For voluntary service to Teignmouth Harbour Users.
- Barbara Ann Gray. For voluntary service to the community in Oxfordshire through the Women's Institute.
- Barbara Caroline Green. For services to the Development of Energy Policy and voluntary service to the community in London.
- Barbara Kathleen Green. For services to Special Education.
- Karen Lynn Green. For services to Young People in Wirral and West Cheshire.
- Lady Milena Grenfell-Baines. For services to Music.
- Richard Paul Griffin. For services to Health and Care.
- Philippa Claire Griffith. For voluntary and public service to the community in Shrewsbury and Shropshire.
- Joanne Lesley Griffiths. For services to Young People and the community in St Helens, Merseyside.
- Nigel James Grimshaw. For services to Policing and the community in Northern Ireland.
- Richard John Groom. For services to the community particularly Disabled Young People.
- Agnes Grunwald-Spier JP. For services to the Jewish Community and Holocaust Awareness.
- Colin Trevor Gurnett. For voluntary service to the community in Kent.
- Andrew Graham Guy. For services to the Hospitality Industry and charity.
- Maria Teresa Hackett. For services to Skills Development in South West Northern Ireland.
- Joan Patricia Anne Hailes. For services to Journalism, Broadcasting and to the community in Northern Ireland.
- Linette Denise Haines. For services to Defence.
- Malcolm Copley Hall. For services to Business.
- Paul Yeomans Hamey. For services to the Regulation of Pesticides.
- Andrew Scott Hamilton. For services to Economic Regeneration and Community Empowerment.
- Maxine Hammond. For services to Service Personnel and their Families.
- Keith Michael Hampson. For services to Young People in Manchester through Scouting.
- Frederick John Hanson. For services to Children and Families.
- Marie Hanson. For services to Young People and to Survivors of Abused women in Wandsworth.
- Violet Shirley Hanson. For services to Children and Families.
- Wilma Carol Grant Harper. For public and voluntary services to the Forestry Sector.
- Clare Elizabeth Harrigan. For services to Further Education and the Construction Industry.
- Trudi (Gertrude Elizabeth Cairns) Harris. For services to Children with Special Educational Needs and Disabilities.
- Roy Harrison. For voluntary service to Cricket in Northern Ireland.
- (Peter) Duncan Haworth. For services to Education.
- John Charles Hayes. For services to the community in Bishopthorpe Road, York.
- Ayesha Hazarika. For political service.
- Dr Charles Thomas Heatley. For services to Primary Healthcare.
- Penelope Ann Hedley Lewis. For voluntary service to the British Red Cross.
- Bradley Hemmings. For services to Culture and Disability Arts particularly in London.
- Margaret Ann Hickish. For services to People with Disabilities.
- Stephen Neil Hodgkinson. For services to the community in Congleton, Cheshire.
- Claire Hodgson. For services to Inclusion and Integration in the Arts and Cultural Sectors.
- David Peter Hong. For services to Optometry particularly voluntary service to Optometry Abroad.
- Elaine Hopkins. For services to Defence.
- Patrick Barron Hopkirk. For services to Motoring and Young People.
- Brian Michael Hosier. For services to the Scout Association and the community in London.
- Stephanie Jayne "Steph" Houghton. For services to Football.
- Linda Houston. For public and voluntary service to Education.
- Christopher Howard. For services to Special Educational Needs.
- Martin Philip Howarth. For services to Children and Education.
- Sydney John Howarth. For services to the community in Newton Aycliffe, County Durham.
- John Howe. For services to Diabetes UK and the community in Trafford, Manchester.
- Jane Carol Howorth. For services to Battery Hen Welfare.
- Anthony Joseph Hubbard. For services to Heritage and the community in Woodbridge, Suffolk.
- David Hughes. For services to charity.
- Nigel Auriol Hughes. For services to the Business Community in London.
- Stephen Paul Humble. For services to Education.
- John Hutchison. For services to People with Learning Disabilities.
- Christopher Hutton. For services to Education.
- Alina Ibragimova. For services to Music.
- Gail Inglis. For services to the Administration of Justice and the community in Cumbria.
- Lucille Ingman. For services to the community and to charity in Leeswood, Flintshire.
- Doreen Anne Irving. For parliamentary services.
- Sonia Jacob. For services to the Magistry and the Voluntary Sector in West Sussex.
- Rosalie Mary James. For services to Agriculture in Wales.
- Elizabeth Claire Jamieson. For services to Students with Dyslexia and Dyspraxia in UK Higher Education.
- Jeanette De Beir Jarratt. For services to the community in Birmingham, West Midlands.
- Oluwayemisi Olivia Jenkins. For services to Border Security and Wellbeing in the Workplace.
- Martin Dudley Johnson. For services to Local Government.
- Susan Johnson JP. For services to Supporting Patients with Cancer.
- Professor Michael Andrew Henry Johnston. For services to the Dairy Industry in Northern Ireland.
- Elizabeth Tina Jones. For services to Childcare and Early Learning in Denbighshire.
- Enid Stella Jones. For services to the community in Dorchester, Dorset.
- Gaynor Jones. For voluntary service to Golf and the Development of Women's Golf in Wales.
- Lyndon Richard Jones. For political service.
- Bryony Jordan. For services to Occupational Therapy for Children with Disabilities.
- John Michael Joseph. For services to Disadvantaged Young People and to People with Disabilities in the Jewish Community.
- Michael Josephson. For charitable services to Children.
- Michael Anthony Breitheamh Judge. For services to charity, Coventry University and the community in Dunchurch, Warwickshire.
- Gurmeet Kalsi. For parliamentary services and voluntary services to the Sikh Community in Surrey.
- Arnold Mark Kaplan. For charitable services particularly through the Gentlemen's Night Out.
- Priscilla Anne Kealy. For services to the community in Ripon, North Yorkshire.
- Janet Ashley Kelly. For services to Maritime Safety.
- Professor Roger John Kemp. For services to Engineering.
- Miranda Kirschel. For services to Equal Opportunities in the Nuclear Industry.
- Stephen Alex Knox. For services to Prisoners.
- Adrian Michael Koe. For voluntary service to Young People through the Downside Fisher Youth Club, Bermondsey, London.
- Eva Margaret Lambert. For services to Sport, Education and Health in the community in Huddersfield, West Yorkshire.
- Councillor David Anthony Lancaster, Councillor, Salford City Council. For services to the community in Salford and charitable services to Elderly People through the Salfordian Hotel Trust.
- Rosemary Lancaster. For charitable services through the Lancaster Foundation.
- John Victor Laverick, vice-president, Wilts and Berks Canal Trust. For voluntary service to Waterways Management and Restoration.
- Tony Kwok Fai Law, President, South East Essex Chinese Association. For services to the Chinese Community in Southend.
- Martin Lawrence, Volunteer and University Ambassador, Crimestoppers. For voluntary service to Crime Prevention in Northamptonshire.
- Janet Margaret Leach, Head of Disabled Children's Services, London Borough of Enfield. For services to Children with Special Educational Needs.
- Patricia Leadbeater. For voluntary service to First Aid through St John Ambulance in the West Midlands.
- Philip Anthony Leason, Customer Service Adviser, Staffordshire. For services to Royal Mail and to the community in Stone, Staffordshire.
- Brian Russell Lee, chair, Football Conference Trust and President, Football Conference. For services to Football.
- Elizabeth Lees, deputy director, Nursing and Patient Experience, East and North Hertfordshire NHS Trust. For services to Nursing.
- David Lenagan. For services to Greater Manchester Fire and Rescue Service and the Children's Burns Foundation.
- Alice Lester, Programme Manager, Planning Advisory Service. For services to Planning.
- Professor David Levin, Founder, The Capital Hotel. For services to Hospitality and Youth Training.
- Alison Lewy, Founder, Fashion Angel. For services to the Fashion Industry.
- Susan Patricia Liburd. For services to Business, Charities and Voluntary Organisations.
- John Alan Little, Founder Member, Helping Others Worldwide. For voluntary and charitable services Abroad.
- John William Lockwood, Honorary Chairman, Lincolnshire Agricultural Society. For services to Agriculture in Lincolnshire.
- Laura Margaret Logan Wood. For services to the community in Chelmsford, Essex.
- Gina Maria Long. For charitable services in East Anglia.
- Eddie Peter Lynch. For services to Vulnerable and Disabled People through Bromley Mencap.
- Thomas Anthony Lynch, Officer, Border Force, Home Office. For services to Border Security and to charity.
- Rowena Orr Macaulay. For services to Higher Education.
- Janice Irene Rosabelle MacBeath. For services to Education and the community in Dores, Inverness-shire.
- Elizabeth Ruth Maclay. For services to People with Disabilities, Children and the community in Hampshire.
- Marion Catherine MacLeod. For services to Healthcare.
- Kenneth Ian MacNab. For services to the Fishing Industry in Scotland.
- Georgina Claire Maitland. For services to Medical Emergencies.
- Helen Marriage. For services to the Arts and Outdoor Performance.
- Austen Neil Marsh. For services to Border Security.
- Sandra Marston. For services to the community in Tameside, Greater Manchester.
- Matthew Thomas Martin. For services to the Charitable Sector and the community in Norfolk.
- Christopher George Matthews-Maxwell TD, For services to the Voluntary Sector.
- Wendy Penelope Maxwell. For services to Carers.
- Ruth Elizabeth Mays. For services to People with Visual Impairments and to Education in Leicestershire.
- Michael Andrew McCarthy. For services to Music in Wales.
- Councillor Patrick McCarthy. For services to Local Government and Community Cohesion in Belfast.
- Cyd McCarthy-Akrill. For services to People with Learning Disabilities and Complex Needs in Hull and Yorkshire.
- Jane McClelland. For services to Taxpayers and voluntary service to Cancer Awareness.
- Carmel Bridget McConnell. For services to School Food.
- Christine Ann McCoy. For services to Social Equality.
- Diane McCrea. For services to the Water Industry and its Customers.
- Isabella Kean McCue. For services to the Arts and Disadvantaged People in Scotland.
- Anita Christina Teresa McGowan. For services to Further Education and to the community in Sutton and Croydon.
- Judith Barbara McGregor. For services to Health Education in the NHS.
- Vivienne McGuire. For services to Anatomy Bequeathal.
- Anne McIlveen. For services to the community in Glasgow.
- Colin McKeown. For services to Drama Production and the community in Liverpool.
- Heather Lyn McKissack. For services to Education.
- Dianne McMillan. For services to Swimming and Disability Awareness.
- Edwin James Bratten McMurran. For services to Education in Northern Ireland.
- Peter McQuade. For services to Charity and Sports Fundraising.
- Rekha Mehr. For services to Entrepreneurship and Enterprise.
- Dr Jayshree Mehta. For services to the community and Community Cohesion in Peterborough.
- Alison Mihail. For services to Young People.
- Stephen James Miller. For services to Sport.
- Ian Mirfin. For services to Disability Sport.
- Cedric Moon. For services to Equality and voluntary service to the Deaf Community in South Wales.
- Audrey May Moore. For public and voluntary services to the Royal Marines.
- Sandra Ann Morgan. For services to the community in Worplesdon, Surrey.
- Cargin Nevil Moss. For services to Taekwondo, community and charity.
- Rev'd Canon Brian Mountford. For services to Ecclesiastical Heritage.
- Douglas Moutrie. For services to People with Disabilities in Kent.
- Nathan Wayne Munson. For services to Counter-Terrorism.
- Anthony Harkness Murray. For services to the community in Wooler and the County of Northumberland.
- Christopher John Murray. For services to Skills in the Energy and Utility Sector and to charity.
- Lorraine Murray. For services to Industry and the community in Ayrshire.
- Saravanamuttu Mylvaganam. For public service and services to the Tamil community in the UK and Sri Lanka.
- Satpal Singh Nahl. For services to Taxpayers and Public Administration.
- Yasmin Mohammed Farooq Nathani. For services to the Empowerment of Women in Leicester.
- John Nelson. For services to the community in Belper, Derbyshire.
- Joseph Martin Neville. For services to Competitive Shooting.
- Tracey Neville. For services to Netball.
- Carol Nice. For services to Children with Special Educational Needs and Disabilities.
- Blanche Nicolson. For services to People with Learning Difficulties and their Families.
- Roger Hugh Nield. For services to Neighbourhood Policing particularly through Social Media.
- Rosanna Mary Noad. For services to Child Protection.
- Jacqueline Anne Oatley. For services to Broadcasting and Diversity in Sport.
- Asha Odedra. For services to Law and Order.
- Peter James Ogden. For services to Public Administration and voluntary service to Young People and charity.
- Christina Ruth O'Keeffe. For services to the community in Lewes, East Sussex.
- Annie Brenda Ollivierre-Smith. For services to Cardiac Nursing.
- Kathleen Rose O'Rourke. For services to Further Education.
- Paulette Jean Osborne. For services to Education.
- Judith Ower. For services to Entrepreneurship.
- Professor Allan Anthony Pacey. For services to Reproductive Medicine.
- Justin James Packshaw. For services to Expeditions, Youth Development and charity.
- Janice Anne Pallas. For charitable services to Children and Families.
- Lt Cdr Geoffrey David Palmer RN (RTD). For voluntary service to Young People through the Sea Cadet Corps.
- Karnail Singh Pannu. For services to the community in Windsor and Maidenhead, Berkshire.
- Benjamin Anthony Parker. For voluntary service to the community in Salisbury, Wiltshire.
- Douglas Alan Parker. For services to the community in Congleton, Cheshire.
- John Parle. For services to Education and to the community in Widnes, Cheshire.
- Janet Elizabeth Parsons. For services to Disabled and Disadvantaged People in Bristol, South Gloucestershire and North Somerset.
- Juliette Paton. For services to charity in Aberdeenshire.
- Kristine Farquhar Pawson. For voluntary and charitable service in Aberdeenshire.
- June Yvonne Pearson. For services to the community in Devon and Wiltshire.
- David Peck. For services to Education.
- Maureen Phillips Perera. For services to Disabled Children in Sri Lanka.
- Carol Maria Phillips. For services to Industry in Northern Ireland.
- Paula Phillips. For services to Mental Health Nursing.
- Richard Escricke Phillips. For services to Music and the Arts.
- Gillian Patricia Platt. For services to Floral Art and the community in Bolton.
- Steven Pleasant. For services to the Welfare and Housing of Asylum Seekers and Refugees.
- Susan Pollack. For services to Holocaust Education.
- Robert John Pooley. For services to Business and to Aviation.
- Clifford Joseph "Goldie" Price. For services to Music and Young People.
- Diane Marie Price. For services to Children and Young People with Special Educational Needs and Disabilities and their Families in Blackburn with Darwen, Lancashire.
- Terence Priest. For services to Laboratory Animal Care and Welfare.
- David William Prout. For services to Community Mental Health Nursing.
- Michael Pusey. For services to Youth Sport in South London.
- Jaz Rabadia. For services to Sustainability in the Energy Management Sector and Diversity in the STEM Sectors.
- Michael Patrick Rafferty. For services to Music in Wales.
- Susan Caroline Raftree. For services to Military Heritage and Commemoration.
- Afsheen Kabir Rashid. For services to Renewable Energy Projects in Deprived London Communities.
- Edith Nellie Ethel Ray. For services to Education.
- Shaun Rayner JP. For services to the Administration of Justice and the community in Essex.
- Asad Razzaq. For services to Young People and the community in Harehills, Leeds.
- Abdullah Rehman. For services to the community in Balsall Heath, Birmingham.
- William David Reilly. For services to Education.
- Martin John Rigley. For services to Business and Innovation.
- Caroline Elizabeth Roberts. For political service.
- Bryan Walter Robinson. For services to the community in Donington, Lincolnshire.
- Katrina Robinson. For services to Social Housing.
- Linda June Robinson. For services to Children and Families.
- Daniel James Roddy. For services to Business and the community in Derry, Londonderry.
- Brian John Rolfe. For services to the community in Lawford and Tendring, Essex.
- Eric Rooney. For services to Dentistry.
- Peter Anthony Rose. For services to Musical Education and Conservation in the UK and Abroad.
- Philip James Round. For services to Apprenticeships and Skills.
- Lindsey Jane Rousseau. For services to Special Educational Needs.
- Oonagh Rowden. For services to Benefit Claimants and services to the community and charity in Downpatrick, County Down.
- Julia Aline Samuel. For services to Bereaved Children.
- Paula Kathleen Sansom. For Humanitarian services to Emergency Healthcare Abroad.
- John McCree Scott JP. For services to the Administration of Justice and to the Railway Community.
- Michael Seabourne. For voluntary service to Armed Forces Personnel and their Families.
- John Wilson Senior TD. For services to the community in Scarborough and to the Armed Forces through Heroes Welcome.
- Anne Seymour. For services to Asylum Seekers and Refugees in South Tyneside.
- David Manuel Shalit. For services to the City of London Corporation and voluntary service to Older People in London.
- Elizabeth Shapland. For voluntary service to Bereaved Offenders and their Families.
- Darren John Share. For services to the Environment in Birmingham.
- Mukesh Sharma DL. For services to the Travel Trade in Northern Ireland.
- Malcolm Ernest Sharp. For services to Town and Country Planning in England.
- Kathleen Shayler. For services to Children and Families.
- Roy Shayler. For services to Children and Families.
- Jane Short. For services to the Art and Craft of Enamelling.
- Tim Sigsworth. For services to Homeless Young Lesbian, Gay, Bisexual and Transgender People.
- Anne Patricia Simpson. For services to the Treatment of Postnatal Depression in the Highlands.
- Zara Smart. For services to Public Administration.
- Enza Smith. For services to Children and Families.
- Michael Anthony Smith. For services to the Reduction of Knife and Gun Crime.
- Dr Philip Henry Smith. For services to Business and to the community in Milton Keynes, Buckinghamshire.
- Helen Rosemary Smyth. For services to Education.
- Sheila Somerville. For services to Patients and their Families in Edinburgh.
- Margaret Diane Southworth. For services to Education.
- Samuel David Sowden. For services to Young People through Scouting in West Yorkshire.
- Kenrick Parker Grant Spencer. For services to the community in Burnley, Lancashire.
- Richard Spindler. For services to Maritime Safety.
- Maureen Spowart Davies. For voluntary service to People with Mental Health Challenges.
- Elizabeth Hansford Spreadbury. For services to the community particularly Survivors of Abuse.
- Maureen Stephen. For services to Business and the community in Aberdeenshire.
- Peter John Stephens. For services to Business and the community in Nottingham.
- Alexander James Stewart. For voluntary service in Perth and Kinross.
- David Charles Stewart. For services to the Scotch Whisky Industry.
- Carol Ann Stonham. For services to Nursing.
- David Anthony Street. For services to Community-based Democracy in Wales.
- Gordon Herbert Stubberfield. For services to Education.
- Peter Sunderland DL. For voluntary service to the Yorkshire Air Ambulance and the community in West Yorkshire.
- Clare Frances Sutcliffe. For services to Technology Education.
- Graham Kent Sutton. For services to Education in Northern Ireland.
- Christine Jane Swan. For services to Education and Interfaith Relations in Oadby, Leicestershire.
- Samantha Jane Swinglehurst. For services to Child and Adolescent Mental Health Services.
- Leslie Alexander Tait. For services to Sea Fishing.
- Jean Taylor. For services to Higher Education and Economic Development in Cornwall.
- Louise Anne Catherine Third. For services to Enterprise and charity.
- Barrie Terence Thomas. For services to Education and to the community in Bingham, Nottinghamshire.
- Patrice Thomas. For services to Children and Families.
- Dr Lesley Thompson. For services to Research.
- Sheila Jacqueline Mary Thompson. For voluntary service to Botanical Research.
- Ella Daphne Tilley. For services to the Food Industry particularly Welsh Lamb.
- Catherine Mary Tindall. For services to Children in Special Educational Needs and Disabilities.
- Sidny Botevyle Tingley. For services to Community Music Theatre particularly through Act One Scene One.
- Heather Tobin. For services to Public Protection in the West Midlands.
- Jennefer Tobin. For services to the Care of Wounded Soldiers.
- Richard Graham Tovey. For services to Education.
- Gilbert Joseph Tunney. For services to the Motor Industry and the community in Trillick, County Tyrone and Enniskillen, County Fermanagh.
- William John Turner. For services to Higher Education.
- Gregory James Valerio. For services to the UK and Fairtrade Gold Sectors in Colombia and East Africa.
- Sally Anne Varah DL. For voluntary service to the community in Surrey.
- Dr Suresh Chandra Vasishtha. For services to the community in the London Borough of Redbridge.
- Valerie Villa. For services to the community in Chelmsford, Essex.
- Philip Vincent-Barwood. For services to the Environment and the community in Hyndburn, Lancashire.
- Dr Ian Stuart Viney. For services to Research Funding and Evaluation.
- Erika Walker. For voluntary services to the community and Social Enterprises in Ammanford, Carmarthenshire.
- Thomas Walsh. For services to the community in Wigan, Greater Manchester.
- Joelle Warren. For services to Business.
- Diane Elaine Watt. For services to the Childrenﾒs Hearings System in Scotland.
- Lucy Alexandra Watts. For services to Young People with Disabilities.
- Yvonne Mary Weatherhead. For services to Education.
- Dr Sharon Helen Webb. For services to Heritage and Archaeology in Scotland.
- Ronald Denholm Webster. For services to Tennis in Scotland.
- Dr Adrian Robert Weston. For services to the community and charity in Leicestershire.
- Sara Catherine Wheeler. For services to Government Administration and voluntary service to the community in South Westminster.
- Graeme Kendal Whippy. For services to People with Dementia and Disabilities.
- (Jonathan) Paul White. For charitable services especially to the Willow Foundation.
- Marion White. For services to charity in Scotland.
- Anne Whitworth. For services to Hockey in the North East.
- John Geoffrey Whyman. For services to the Sick and Terminally Ill through Art Therapy.
- Helen Macpherson Young Wilcox. For services to Social Care.
- Jeremy John Edwin Wilding. For services to Music through the Three Choirs Festival in Herefordshire.
- Carol Dorothy Wiles. For services to the community in Harleston, South Norfolk.
- Dr Anthony Ffoulkes Williams. For services to Nutrition in Infants and Children.
- Christopher Williams. For services to Special Educational Needs.
- Emlyn Tysill Williams. For public and political service in Barry, Glamorgan.
- Fara Williams. For services to Women's Football and charity.
- Owain Tudor Williams. For public and voluntary service to Community Cohesion in Wales.
- Hillary Frances Willmer. For voluntary service to Disadvantaged Communities in West Yorkshire.
- Adrian Wills. For services to the community in Leicester.
- Anne Catherine Wilson. For services to Engineering in Yorkshire.
- Jeanette Ross Wilson. For services to the Holiday Parks Industry.
- Pauline Marie Wilson. For services to Education.
- Robert Allan David Wilson. For services to the Music Industry and charity.
- Stephen Richard Mallett Wilson DL Suffolk. For charitable and voluntary service to the community in Suffolk.
- Paul Winter. For services to Skills and Employment of Young People.
- Philip Rowland Wolfe. For services to Renewable Energy and the Energy Sector.
- Professor Kim Wolff. For public service to Road Safety.
- Howard Antony Wood. For services to Education.
- Joseph Wood. For voluntary service to the British Red Cross.
- Frederick Wood-Brignall. For services to the community in Lydd and Romney Marsh, Kent.
- Jill Woodhouse. For services to Children.
- Emma Jane Lewis Woods. For services to Rural Business and Skills in North Yorkshire.
- Nigel Leonard Woolner. For services to the Arts and Education.
- John Fraser Worthington. For services to Urban Regeneration and voluntary service to Transport.
- Jean Elizabeth Yates. For political service and service to the community in Lancashire.
- Laura Naomi Young. For services to Chronically Ill Children in Scotland.
- The Reverend Terence John Young. For services to the community in Darwen, Lancashire.

Diplomatic and Overseas List

- John Jackie Barclay, British Honorary Consul, Port Elizabeth. For services to British nationals in the Eastern Cape, South Africa.
- David Iain Drummond Bennett, Regional Supervisor, Turkey, Commonwealth War Graves Commission. For services to the Gallipoli centenary commemorations.
- Ms Greta Beresford, Safe Childbirth Programme Co-ordinator. For services to improving midwifery, principally in Russia, Uzbekistan and Azerbaijan.
- Richard Bogg, Branch Vice President, SSAFA. For services to the British Service community in France.
- The Reverend Canon Malcolm McNeille Bradshaw, Senior Chaplain, Anglican Church in Greece. For services to interfaith understanding and community charities in Greece.
- Gillian Margaret Norah, Mrs. Brion, British Vice Consul, Balearics, Palma. For services to British nationals travelling to and living in the Balearic Islands, Spain.
- Ms Catherine Contain, Head of Arts, British Council, Egypt. For services to UK-Egyptian cultural relations in the area of Arts.
- Harold Thomas Edwards, First Secretary, Foreign and Commonwealth Office. For services to British foreign policy.
- Jacqueline Rose, Mrs. Ellick, Coordinator, Ascension Island Turtle Group. For services to the environment and the community on Ascension Island.
- Miss Katie Ann Gatward, Volunteer Nurse. For nursing services to Ebola victims in West Africa.
- Dawit Wolde Michael Gebre-Ab, Senior Director, Strategic Planning, Djibouti Ports and Free Zone Authority. For services to British Djibouti trade relations.
- Margaret Mary, Mrs. Golding, Consultant in Autism. For services to Special Needs Education and to Autism.
- Robin Walter Hill, chairman and Founder, New Hope Foundation. For services to saving lives and palliative care for orphan children in China.
- Dr. Amy Harriet Hughes, Trainee Specialist in Emergency Medicine. For services to humanitarian and emergency medicine.
- Ms Catherine Mary Inglehearn, Former Deputy Head, Ebola Task Force, Foreign and Commonwealth Office. For services to UK foreign policy in Africa.
- Stephen Arthur Logan, Station Manager, South Wales Fire and Rescue Service. For services to British Serbian relations and assistance to the Serbian fire services.
- Donat Kieran James Morgan, formerly President, National Association of British Schools in Spain. For services to British education in Spain.
- Ms Dima Naaman, Political Officer, Syria Office, Istanbul, Foreign and Commonwealth Office. For services to British interests in Syria.
- Ms Fiona Rose Peacey, Clinic Nurse, British High Commission, Lilongwe. For services to healthcare in Malawi.
- Professor Paul Thomas Rishworth, Attorney General of Pitcairn Islands. For legal services to the Pitcairn Islands.
- Peter Raymond Scawen, Equitable Life Compensation campaigner. For services to the British community in France.
- Ms Mona Nashman Smith, Retired Superintendent of the American British Academy, Muscat. For services to the promotion of education on Oman and to community relations.
- Miss Serena Stone, Political Officer, British Embassy, Mogadishu, Somalia. For services to international peace and security.
- Ms Judith Orissa Summers, Justice of the Peace, Falkland Islands. For services to justice in the Falkland Islands.
- The Right Honourable Roger Mynors Swinfen Eady, Baron Swinfen, Director, Swinfen Charitable Trust UK (Kent). For services to international telemedicine.
- Ms Susan Thain, Honorary Consul, Lanzarote and managing director, Lanzarote Weddings. For services to the British Embassy and the British community in the Canary Islands, Spain.
- Ms Urszula Barbara Ann Wojciechowska, executive director, British American Business Council of New England. For services to British, American and international business communities in North America and the United Kingdom.

=== British Empire Medal (BEM) ===
- Sandra Elizabeth Adams – for services to the Girl Guides.
- Sylvia Phyllis Ainsworth – President, Plymouth and District Federation of Ex-Services Associations. For services to the Plymouth Festival of Remembrance.
- Dorothy Helen Alexander – for services to the community in Bourne, Lincolnshire.
- Aatin Ashok Anadkat – Managing Director, Hotel Maiyango, Leicester. For services to Entrepreneurship in Leicestershire.
- Charles Frederick Andrews – for voluntary service to the Poppy Appeal in London.
- Leroy Christopher Kenneth Angel – Rugby Volunteer. For services to Rugby.
- Isabella Apsley – for services to St John Ambulance and the Red Cross in Northern Ireland.
- Joseph Peter Austin – for services to the community in Northern Ireland.
- Trevor John Avery – for services to Heritage in the Lake District.
- Roger James Godfray Bacon – chairman, SSAFA Bereaved Families Support Group. For voluntary service to Service Families.
- Sarah Elizabeth Airey Bain – President, Black Down and Hindhead Supporters Group, National Trust. For services to Conservation in Surrey and West Sussex.
- Kenneth Ball – Station Manager, Consett Fire Station, County Durham and Darlington Fire and Rescue Service. For services to Fire and Rescue and the community in County Durham.
- Samantha Barlow – Founder, Fitmums and Friends. For services to Fitness in East Yorkshire.
- Valerie Ann Barr – Secretary, Faculty of Social Sciences, University of Ulster. For services to Higher Education and to the community in Northern Ireland.
- Michael Beard – Water Polo Coach and chair, Solihull Swimming Club. For voluntary service to Swimming and Water Polo.
- Harold Atkinson Beckinsale – for voluntary service to Education in Northern Ireland.
- Stuart Geoffrey Bell – for services to the community in Lincolnshire.
- Harriet Katherine Bennett – for services to Music and the community in Felixstowe.
- Alexander William Bertram – Rehabilitation Instructor, Carstairs Hospital. For services to Psychiatric Care.
- Christine Mcdiarmid Black – Badminton Development Officer, East Lothian Council. For services to Badminton in Scotland.
- Sharon Lesley Blackman – Head Coach, Chichester Fencing Club. For services to Fencing.
- Valerie Blake – for services to the Arrow Riding Centre for the Disabled in Dartford, Kent.
- Valerie Ann Bolt – for services to charity and the community in Cholsey, Oxfordshire.
- Danny Bonwitt – for services to voluntary organisations in the UK.
- John Jarvis Bosley – for charitable and community service in Warminster, Wiltshire particularly through the Royal British Legion.
- Adrian George Botham – chairman, Pantonic All Stars Steel Orchestra and Community Volunteer. For services to Education.
- Veronica Box – for services to the community in Burntwood, Staffordshire.
- Mary Elizabeth Maureen Brewer – Volunteer, Neighbourhood Watch. For services to Crime Prevention in West Yorkshire.
- Councillor Roger Keith Trillo Bright – for voluntary service to the community in Knighton and District Powys.
- Henrietta Fraser Brown – for voluntary service in Ross-shire particularly through The Queen Mother's Clothing Guild.
- Jean Brown – for services to the community in Belfast.
- Patricia Margaret Brown – for services to community through the Linskill Centre, Tyne and Wear and the Scouting Movement.
- Paul Anthony Brown – lately Police Constable, South Yorkshire Police. For services to Law and Order and the community in South Yorkshire.
- David Ian Buchanan – Secretary, Oban Saints Amateur Football Club. For voluntary service to Football.
- Janet Bucknell – lately School Support Worker, Lonsdale School, Stevenage. For services to Special Educational Needs and Disabilities.
- Joan Margaret Buller – for services to the community in Staplehurst, Kent.
- Mary Burch – for voluntary service in Dunbartonshire.
- June Mary Elizabeth Burke – for voluntary service through the Tenovus Cancer Charity, Cardiff.
- Rosemary Ann Burns – for services to Local Government and to the community in Sussex.
- Anne Connor Butterworth – for services to the community in St Leonards, Hertfordshire and to the Spinal Muscular Atrophy Trust.
- Ailsa Elizabeth Button – Founder, The Gemmery Mother and Toddler Group, Walton on Thames, Surrey. For services to Children and Families.
- Bridget Kathleen Carey Cameron – for services to Young People and Families of Offenders in the West Midlands.
- Anne Elizabeth Campbell – for services to the Multiple Sclerosis Society in the Scottish Borders.
- Patricia Anne Campbell – Civic Officer, Banbury Town Council. For services to Local Government.
- Michael Andrew Carey – for voluntary service to the community in Silsden, West Yorkshire.
- Lady Margaret Ann Carter – for services to the community in Stock, Essex.
- Peter John George Chambers – for voluntary service to Music in Coventry.
- Helena Charles – for voluntary service to the community in Blaengarw, Bridgend.
- Maurice Charlesworth – Senior Volunteer, Age UK Lambeth. For services to Older People in Lambeth, London.
- Paul Chidgey – Chair of Governors, The Barlow Roman Catholic High School and Specialist Science College, Manchester. For services to Education.
- Wendy Angharad Churchouse – Arrhythmia Nurse, Morriston Hospital, Swansea. For services to Cardiac Patients in South West Wales.
- Gerard Paul Cleary – Administrative Officer, Personal Tax Operations, East Kilbride, H.M. Revenue and Customs. For services to Taxpayers and voluntary services to Thalidomide Awareness.
- Gaynor Ellen Mary Clegg – Senior Lunchtime Supervisor, Ravensthorpe Church of England (Controlled) Junior School, Dewsbury. For services to Education.
- Janet Colquhoun – Crossing Patrol Warden, Dunrobin Primary School, Airdrie. For services to Education.
- (Valerie) Joy Cook – for voluntary service to the community in Borth, Ceredigion.
- Elizabeth Sally Coot – for services to Fundraising and to the community in Constantine, Cornwall.
- Rosemary Corbett Thomas – District Cub Scout Leader, Llangollen, Wrexham. For services to the Scout Movement in Llangollen District, Wrexham.
- Dr Elisabeth Marjorie Cotton – for services to the community in Cranfield, Bedfordshire.
- Sheila Frances Coulson – for services to the community in Hackness, North Yorkshire.
- Agnes Forsyth Robb Craig – chair, Save the Children, Wigtownshire. For voluntary and charitable services.
- Ruth Craig – for voluntary and charitable services to the community in Ballygowan, County Down.
- Robert Crangle – for services to Young People in Northern Ireland through the Boys' Brigade.
- Ronald Crangle – for services to Young People in Northern Ireland through the Boys' Brigade.
- Maisie Crawford – for services to the community in County Londonderry, Northern Ireland.
- Alan Crocker – Founder, Derry Hill United Football Club. For services to Football in Wiltshire.
- William Crowe – for services to the community and Children's Charities in Dumbarton, Strathclyde.
- (Elizabeth) Ann Cumming – for charitable services through the Calvert Trust, Exmoor.
- Elizabeth Maud Cunningham – Member, North West Mountain Rescue Team. For voluntary service to the community in County Fermanagh, Northern Ireland.
- Heather Constance Cunningham – for services to the Arts and the community in the East Neuk of Fife.
- Neil Alexander Currie – Physical Education Instructor, H.M. Prison Barlinnie. For public and charitable services.
- Mary Elizabeth Cutler – for charitable services to Grove House Hospice, St Albans, Hertfordshire.
- Suzanne Jane Dando Reynolds – for services to charity.
- Dr Darren Frazer Daniels – Chief Executive, The UK Sepsis Trust. For services to Improving Services for people with sepsis.
- Janice Catherine Davidson – Personal Assistant to Chief Operating Officer, Translink. For services to Public Transport in Northern Ireland.
- Helen Josephine Davies – for services to Animal Welfare in Northern Ireland through the Rainbow Centre, Eglinton, Londonderry.
- Leonard John Robert Davies – for services to Rugby Union in the North West.
- Patricia Margery Davies – for services to the community in Llangynidr, Brecon, Powys.
- Richard Anthony Davies – Coroner's Officer, Western District of Somerset. For services to the Bereaved.
- Susan Mary Deborah Davies – for services to the community in Barton in Fabis, Nottinghamshire.
- Dennis Joseph Davison – for services to Second World War Commemoration and Memorialisation.
- Margaret Dawson – for services to the Hambleton District Show and to charity.
- Anthony James Day – for services to the community in Norton St Philip, Somerset.
- Nick William Charles Dermott – for services to Heritage and Conservation in Thanet.
- Maureen Elizabeth Dobbie – for services to the community in Teesdale, County Durham.
- Terence Gabriel Doherty – for services to Community Safety and Public Protection in Northern Ireland.
- Pauline Anne Donaldson – Treasurer, Tyne and Wear ME/CFS Support Group. For services to People with Myalgic Encephalomyelitis and Chronic Fatigue Syndrome and their Carers.
- Maureen Lilian Dougall – for services to the community in Brundall, Norfolk.
- Mary Dovey – Volunteer, Hughenden Manor. For services to Heritage in Buckinghamshire.
- Patricia Joan Easthope – for voluntary services to the community in Royston, Hertfordshire.
- Lilly Ebert – for services to Holocaust Education and Awareness.
- Fay Mary Edwards – chair, Chelsea Tenant Management Organisation. For services to the community in Kensington and Chelsea, London.
- Derek Samuel Walter Elliott – for services to the community in Devizes, Wiltshire.
- Sylvia Margaret Emmott – for public and political service.
- Dean Vincent Evans – for services to the community in Blackwater, Cornwall.
- Philip Everett – for services to The New Appeals Organisation, Nottingham.
- Christine Ann Eyre – for services to the community in Sutton, Macclesfield.
- Ruth Mary Fagan – Policy Adviser, Cycling Policy, Department for Transport. For services to Transport and to charity.
- John Thomas Fall – for services to the community in Kirklington, North Yorkshire.
- Chaim Ferster – for services to Holocaust Education.
- Peter Fish – for services to the Elderly in Hollingworth, and Hyde, Cheshire and Glossop, Derbyshire
- Ann Foat – chair, Ash Heritage Group. For services to the community in Ash, Kent.
- Angela Margaret Forder-Stent – for services to the community in Twyford, Hampshire.
- Helen Fowler – Volunteer Reading Assistant, St. George's Infant School and Woodside Junior School, Amersham. For services to Children and Reading.
- Helen Mary Francis – for charitable services in Trefonen, Shropshire.
- The Reverend Kwaku Frimpong-Manson – for services to the community in Tottenham, London.
- Glenda Frost – for services to the community in Willand and Cullompton, Devon.
- Fiona Fry – Lead Specialist Nurse in Hepatology, Royal Devon and Exeter NHS Foundation Trust. For services to Nursing.
- Michael Stuart Galloway-Allbut – Governor and lately Chair of Governors, Catherine Infant School, Leicester. For services to Education.
- John Gardner – for services to the community in High Bradfield and Low Bradfield, South Yorkshire.
- Elizabeth Heather Gibbons – for services to Riding for the Disabled in South West Cornwall.
- David Roy Gifford – for services to the community in King's Lynn, Norfolk.
- Sheila Glass – for services to the community in Ramsbury and Axford, Wiltshire.
- Patricia Mary Glazebrook – Vice President, Sick Children's Trust. For services to Sick Children and their Families in Cambridge.
- James Sydney Goodman – for services to Music through the Britannia Band and Londonderry Musical Society, Londonderry.
- Maureen Gould – Chair of Governors, Oak View School, Loughton. For services to Education.
- Peter Cyril Goulding – Clerk, Carlton-in-Lindrick Parish Council. For services to the community in Nottinghamshire.
- Alison Ruth Grant – chair, Hillingdon Slipstreamers Cycling Club. For services to Cycling.
- Henry Sinclair Gray – chair, Wick Heritage Society. For voluntary service in Wick, Caithness.
- Jean Greatorex – for services to the community in Ashbourne, Derbyshire.
- Jody Louisa Green – Mentor, Community Led Initiatives, Manchester. For services to the Resettlement of Ex-Offenders.
- Margaret Anderson Green – for services to the community in Oldmeldrum, Aberdeenshire particularly through Bourtie Rural Women's Institute.
- Pauline Griffiths – Curator, Narberth Museum. For services to Heritage and the community in Pembrokeshire.
- Samantha Groom – lately Festivals and Events Manager, Visit Cornwall. For services to Tourism in Falmouth and Cornwall.
- Alexander John Gunn – for services to Heritage and the community in Caithness.
- Pamela Patricia Ann Gunn – for services to First Aid through St John Ambulance Service, Enniskillen Division.
- Richard Hadden – Beadle, St Michael's Church, Inveresk. For services to the community in East Lothian.
- Alan Stuart Hague – Leader, 16th Morecambe and Heysham Scout Group. For services to Young People through Scouting in Lancashire.
- Gail Hall – Leader, 16th Morecambe and Heysham Scout Group. For services to Children and Young People with Special Educational Needs and Disabilities.
- David Melvyn Hando – for services to the community in Newport and to Newport County Association Football Club.
- Joan Harding – for services to the community in Beighton, Sheffield.
- Alan Clive Hargreaves – Technical Services and Facilities Manager, Department of Civil and Environmental Engineering, Imperial College London. For services to Engineering Research.
- Reginald Keith Hart – for services to the community in Lympsham, Somerset.
- Kay Harvey – for voluntary and charitable services to Children, Young People and Families in Badersfield, Norfolk.
- Michael Lawrence Harwood – for services to the community in Warwick.
- Kenneth Hayes – for services to Elderly and Vulnerable People in Hartlepool.
- John Boyd Henderson – for services to the community in Severn Stoke, Worcestershire.
- John Joe Heuerman – Ambassador, Bobby Moore Fund. For services to Cancer Research.
- Ann Catherine Inglis Hickman – for services to the community in Retford, Nottinghamshire and to the Royal British Legion.
- Philip Highley – for services to the community in Kenilworth, Warwickshire.
- Keelie Jayne Hill – Teaching Assistant, Sherbourne Fields School, Coventry and Sherbourne Stars Coach. For services to Children with Special Educational Needs and Disabilities.
- Cllr William Hill – for services to the community and charity in Horden, County Durham.
- John Edwin Hilsum – for voluntary service to Cricket and the community in the Isle of Wight.
- Donald Hollands – for services to the community in Wimpole, Cambridgeshire.
- Shirley Holt – School Volunteer, Chorley New Road Primary School, Horwich, Bolton and Community Volunteer. For services to Education.
- Pamela Susan Hopkins – for charitable and voluntary services to the community in Llanhilleth, Blaenau Gwent.
- Clive Hubery – Chair of Governors, The Oaks Secondary School, Spennymoor, Co Durham. For services to Education.
- Anthony Hudson – for services to the communities in Monk Fryston and Hillam, North Yorkshire.
- Jacqueline Humphries – for services to the community in the West Midlands.
- Julia Margaret Hurrell – Executive Officer, Ministry of Defence. For services to Defence and to charity.
- Canon Keith Cyril Ineson – Agricultural Chaplain and Coordinator, Cheshire Farm Community Network. For services to the Farming Community in Cheshire.
- Anthony Paul Ingle – for voluntary and charitable services to the community in Cambridgeshire through Church Music.
- Alderman Elizabeth Ingram – Armagh City, Banbridge and Craigavon District Council. For services to Local Government and the community.
- Anthony Mark Ives – for services to Youth Clubs and the community in Dorset.
- Lynda Jeffrey – Founder, Stenton Singers Choir. For services to Music and charity in Stenton, East Lothian.
- George Andrew Johnston – for services to the community in Portadown, Northern Ireland.
- Amanda Jolliffe – Badger Set Leader, Griffithstown, Gwent. For voluntary service to First Aid through St John Ambulance.
- Cy Jones – for services to the community in Ludlow, Shropshire.
- Georgina Jones – lately Church Organist, St. Gwyddelan's Church, Dolwyddelan. For voluntary service to the Church and the community in Dolwyddelan, Conwy.
- Rita Janet Jones – Secretary, The Trees Estate Residents' Association. For services to the community in Stretford, Greater Manchester.
- Vanessa Ann Jones – chair, Bredhurst Parish Council, and chair, Bredhurst Woodland Action Group. For services to Woodland Management and the community in Kent.
- Jack Kagan – for services to Holocaust Education and Awareness.
- Agatha Kalisperas – for services to the Greek community in London.
- Elizabeth Kilpatrick – for voluntary service to First Aid and the community in Kilwinning, Ayrshire.
- Richard Henry King – Retained Watch Manager, Lincolnshire Fire and Rescue Service. For services to Fire and Rescue and to Emergency Medical Care.
- Sybil King – for services to the community in Thaxted, Essex.
- Pamela Kirkbride – for services to the community in Coniston, Cumbria.
- Isobel Kirkwood – Volunteer, Erskine Homes. For services to Veterans in Scotland.
- Fred Knoller – for services to Holocaust Education and Awareness.
- The Reverend Robert Alan Knox – for services to the Royal British Legion and the community in Londonderry.
- Anne Whitworth Lampson – for services to Young People through the Girl Guides, and to the community in Meare, Somerset.
- Michael George Laskey – for services to Contemporary Poetry.
- Gillian Mary Laws – for services to the community in Exmouth, Devon.
- Margaret Susan Leckey – for services to Children through Fostering and the Kiddy Winks Mums and Toddlers Group, County Down.
- Michael Jason Lee – Volunteer, Kennet and Avon Canal Trust. For services to the Restoration of the Kennet and Avon Canal.
- Penry Alan Lewis – for services to Conservation and Angling in Mid Wales.
- Christian Evelyn Lindsay – for services to the community in East Linton, East Lothian.
- Anthony Clive Linger – for services to the community in Sutton Coldfield, West Midlands.
- Marion Lockhart – Honorary Industrial Secretary, Glendale Show. For services to the Glendale Show and the community in Wooler, Northumberland.
- Marie Teresa Lomas – Teaching Assistant, William Hulme's Grammar School, Manchester. For services to Education and to the community in Greater Manchester.
- Glenys Lord – Domestic Services Manager, University of Cumbria. For services to Higher Education.
- Samuel Thomas Loughrey – for services to Golf in Northern Ireland.
- Amelia Elaine Luffrum – for services to Homeless and Deprived People in South Tyneside.
- Dr Ashley Stuart Lupin – for Humanitarian services to Medical Training in Uganda.
- Rebecca Lyne – Voluntary Co-ordinator, The Bank. For services to the community in Eye, Suffolk.
- Elizabeth Janet Campbell Lyttle – for services to the community in Portaferry, County Down.
- Ruaraidh Peter Macdonagh – for services to Healthcare particularly voluntary service to Healthcare Provision in Zanzibar.
- Calina Graham Macdonald – for services to Business and Horticulture in Skye and Lochalsh.
- Andrew David Ross Mackenzie – for services to the community in Dornoch, Sutherland.
- John Ronald Macleod – for voluntary service to Dingwall Museum and the community in Ross-shire.
- Pamela Jane Cherie Martin – for services to the community in Mitcheldean, Gloucestershire.
- Susan Martin – for services to Young People in Northern Ireland through the Girls' Brigade.
- David Edward Mason – for services to charity and the community in Sutton, Surrey.
- Mary Susan Matthews – for services to Young People through the Girls' Brigade in Hextable, Kent.
- Maureen Frances Matthews – for services to the community in Winscombe, Somerset and charitable services to the Children's Society.
- Margaret Maureen Mcadam – for services to Portadown Ladies' Choir and to Girl Guiding in County Armagh.
- Sean Mccarthy – for voluntary service to the Poppy Appeal in London.
- Angus Campbell Mcconnell – for voluntary service to Sport in Scotland.
- Mary Jane Mcfarland – for voluntary service to South West Acute Hospital and the community in Enniskillen, Northern Ireland.
- Anthony Joseph Mcgeehan JP – for services to the community in Greenisland, County Antrim.
- Liam Mchugh – for services to the Cystic Fibrosis Trust.
- Samuel Mcilwrath – for services to the community in Comber, Northern Ireland.
- Graham Mcinnes – for services to Church Music and the Wellingborough Talking Newspaper.
- Mary Mckinney – for services to the community in the City and County of Londonderry.
- Helen Clare Meehan – lately Specialist Palliative Care Nurse, Heart of England NHS Foundation Trust. For services to Palliative Care.
- Maureen Frances Jane Meehan – for voluntary service to Crime Prevention in Birmingham.
- Sarfraz Alam Mian – chief executive officer, Neue Schule Limited. For services to UK Trade.
- Christopher Miles – for services to the community in Packington, Leicestershire.
- Dorothy Mitchinson – for services to community through the Linskill Community Centre, Tyne and Wear.
- Kenneth Charles Monk – for services to the community in Ardingly, West Sussex.
- Margaret Jean Morgan – lately co-chair, The Ascot, Sunninghill and Sunningdale Neighbourhood Plan Delivery Group Committee. For services to the community in Berkshire.
- Karin Morris – for voluntary service to Tenovus Cancer Charity and to the community in Cardiff.
- Marny Mowatt – lately Secretary, Orkney Agricultural Society. For services to the Orkney County Show.
- Robert Charles Henry Mudway – for services to the community in Brocton, Staffordshire.
- William Theodore Cecil Mullen – for services to the Lough Neagh Rescue Service.
- Sarah Jane Munro – for services to Business and the community in Macclesfield particularly through the Treacle Market.
- Paul Anthony Myers – Mayor, Midsomer Norton. For services to the community.
- Sybil Janet Naylor – for services to the community in Dronfield, Derbyshire.
- Elizabeth Sharon Mary Neely – for services to People with Dementia and their Families through the Alzheimer's Society.
- Minnie Florence Newcombe – for services to the community in Barton Turf and Neatishead, Norfolk.
- Marilyn Winifred Nolan – for voluntary service to the community in Newhaven, East Sussex.
- Ian Robert Northcott – lately Police Constable, West Midlands Police. For services to the community particularly Homeless People in the West Midlands.
- Ronke Oke – for services to Business and charity
- Jean Margaret Olney – for services to the community in Mayfield, East Sussex.
- Brian Thomas O'Neill – Co-chairman, 3rd Regiment Royal Horse Artillery Past and Present Members Association. For voluntary service to Ex-Service Personnel.
- Mary Theresa O'Neill – for charitable services in Glasgow.
- Rudolf Oppenheimer – for services to Holocaust Education and Awareness.
- Harold Sidney Osborne – for services to the community in Crowle, North Lincolnshire.
- Keith Lionel Ottywill – School Volunteer, Centre Academy East Anglia, Ipswich. For services to Education.
- Noushabeh Pakpour-Samari – for services to the Ladies' Creative Centre and the community in Ealing, London.
- Dennis William Parker – for services to the community in Uttoxeter and Denstone, Staffordshire.
- Harry Aubrey Parkes – Designer and Campaigner, Bevin Boys Memorial. For services to the Bevin Boys Commemoration.
- Mary Freeman Parry – Rrustee, Wrexham Care Association. For services to Elderly People in Wrexham.
- David Charles Payne – for services to Education and Scouting in Pinner, Middlesex.
- Alison Jane Peak – for services to the community in Gloucester, Gloucestershire.
- Ernest Albert Pearce – for charitable services through the Lions Club in Stowmarket and District and to the community in Bacton, Suffolk.
- Rosemary Peaty – for services to the community in Blakeney, Gloucestershire.
- Gillian Penwell – for services to Elderly and Bereaved People in Weymouth, Dorset.
- Ivor Perl – for services to Holocaust Education.
- Jane Pettigrew – for services to Tea Production and History.
- Colin William Picken – lately County Poppy Appeal Co-ordinator, Derbyshire. For voluntary service to the Royal British Legion.
- David Robert Pike – Firefighter, Greater Manchester Fire and Rescue Service. For services to the Fire and Rescue Service and the community in Greater Manchester.
- Robert Godfrey Pither – for services to the community in Pontesbury and the Shrewsbury Macular Support Group, Shropshire.
- Rev'd Canon David Michael Power – St. Cuthbert's Church. For services to the community in Portsmouth.
- Basil Edward Priest – for voluntary service to Holme Towers Marie Curie Hospice, Penarth, Vale of Glamorgan.
- Deborah Ruth Quinn – for services to Business and the community in Macclesfield particularly through the Treacle Market.
- Sajid Rashid – for services to the community and charitable fundraising in Burton-on-Trent, Staffordshire.
- Gurdev Singh Rayat – for services to the community in Greenwich, London.
- Violet Elizabeth Razzell – for services to Healthcare and the community in Perry, Cambridgeshire.
- Colin Charles Rea – for services to Young People through the Scout Association.
- Brian Keith Reader – lately Surrey Area Footpath Secretary, The Ramblers. For services to promoting the Rights of Way Network in Surrey.
- Habib Rehman – for services to Business and Community Relations in Birmingham.
- Pearly May Reid – for services to the community in West Bromwich, West Midlands.
- Freda Alice Ridgway – for services to the community in Prees and Fauls, Shropshire.
- Graham Riley – for services to the community in Shropshire.
- Norman James Rimmer – Director of Music, Holy Trinity Church, Llandudno. For services to Music and the community in North Wales.
- Alan James Roberts – for services to the community in Manchester.
- Dilys Elizabeth Roberts – for services to the Girl Guides and the community in Rhyl, Denbighshire.
- Joseph William Roberts – for services to the community in Chesterfield.
- Thomas Delwyn Roberts – for voluntary service to the community in Llangollen, Wrexham.
- Kirsty Robson – for services to Taxpayers and charitable services to Cancer Research and Awareness.
- Alan Henry George Rowe – for services to the community in Cobham, Kent through the Parish Council.
- Justin Rowe – for services to the community and to charity in Malton, North Yorkshire.
- John Wooldridge Rowland – for services to the community in Bassingham, Lincolnshire.
- Valerie Rowland – for services to the community in Borossa Common, Surrey.
- (Rene) Rywka Salt – for services to Holocaust Survivors, Education and Awareness.
- Malcolm Victor Scothern – chairman, East Midlands Branch, Queen's Royal Lancers Regimental Association. For voluntary service to Ex-Service Personnel.
- William Scott – Founder and artistic director, Miracle Theatre Company. For services to the Arts in Cornwall.
- Elizabeth Joan Sexton – chairman, League of Friends of Chippenham Hospital. For services to the community in Chippenham, Wiltshire.
- Carol Daphne Seymour – for voluntary service to Art and People with Disabilities in Stirlingshire.
- Marilyn Rosemary Sharp – for services to the community in Ivybridge, Devon.
- Zygmunt Shipper – for services to Holocaust Education and Awareness.
- Jacqueline Simpson – for services to Older People in Lincoln.
- Pauline Anne Simpson – Secretary, National FEPOW Fellowship Welfare Remembrance Association. For voluntary service to the Former Far East Prisoners of War Community.
- Neil Owen Skelton – for services to the Preservation and Conservation of Imber Church, Wiltshire.
- Brenda Margaret Slade – for services to Westminster Abbey and the Creation and Preservation of Ceremonial Garments.
- (Ward Westley) Gary Smart – Owner, Harbour Park. For services to the Tourism and Leisure Park Industry.
- Linda Margaret Smith – Parish and District Councillor, Chalfont St. Peter. For services to Local Government and the community in Chalfont St. Peter, Buckinghamshire.
- Nicholas Andrew Smith – Woodland Officer, Forestry Commission. For services to the Forestry and Environmental Sectors in Herefordshire and to Ornithology.
- Sharon Winifred Smith – for services to History and the community in Uffington, Oxfordshire.
- Gordon James Speer – for services to Peace-Building and Community Cohesion in Castlederg, County Tyrone.
- Jean Spence – for services to Education and the community in Rishton, Lancashire.
- Elizabeth Anne Spruce – for services to Young People and the community in Alva, Clackmannanshire.
- Marian Jane Stapley – Volunteer, The Chernobyl Children's Lifeline. For services to charity.
- Dorothy Hana Start – for services to the community in Friern Barnet, Hertfordshire and to charity.
- (Norman) Alan Stennett – Broadcaster. For services to the Farming Industry and Broadcasting in Lincolnshire.
- Elizabeth Esther Steven – for services to the community in Loughborough, Leicestershire and charitable service to Disadvantaged People in Nepal.
- Thomas Mccaig Stevenson – Project Manager, Mull of Galloway Trail. For voluntary services to Walkers in the West of Scotland.
- Brian James Stone – for service to community in Northampton.
- Jessie Roy Stuart – for services to Scottish Country Dancing and Old Time Dancing.
- Wendy Ann Taaffe – for services to the community in Wirral particularly through Guiding.
- (Patricia) Brenda Taylor – Founder, Brenda Taylor School of Dance. For services to Dance.
- Susan Nicola Templeman – for services to Heritage.
- Mary Diana Ethel Thornley – for services to Equestrianism.
- Lisa Wendy Towers – Senior Executive Officer, Home Office and co-founder, Break the Stigma. For services to Mental Health Awareness.
- Kathleen Sylvia Tracey – for services to Charitable Fundraising in County Armagh.
- George Troup – chairman, TS Queen Elizabeth. For services to the Sea Cadets and the community in Clydebank, Dunbartonshire.
- Hazel Elise Turay – for services to the community in Tulse Hill, London.
- Peter Twyman – Music Teacher, Lipson Co-Operative Academy, Plymouth, Devon. For services to Young People and Music.
- Erica Joyce Ellen Tye – for services to the community in Sunbury-on-Thames, Middlesex.
- Richard John Charles Tyler – Lead Service Manager, Event First Aid and Emergency Response. For services to the British Red Cross in Kent and Sussex.
- Leslie Underdown – for services to the community in Cropredy, Oxfordshire.
- Elizabeth Versi – Grade 6, Home Office and co-founder, Break the Stigma. For services to Mental Health Awareness.
- Craig Gordon Vidler – for services to charities.
- Kathryn Ruth Vowden – lately Nurse Consultant, Bradford Teaching Hospitals NHS Foundation Trust. For services to Nursing.
- Natalie Frances Wade – Founder and Director, Small Green Shoots. For services to the Creative Industries.
- Canon Alfred Derrick Walkden – for services to the community in Preston, Lancashire.
- Elizabeth Walker – Volunteer, ChildLine Glasgow. For services to Children and Young People.
- Ann Walsh – for charitable services particularly through Cancer Research UK.
- George Walsh – Volunteer, ChildLine Glasgow. For services to the community in Belfast.
- Bryan Ellis Wardley – Treasurer, St. Margaret's Institute. For services to the community in Oxford.
- John Ernest Warren – for services to the Art of Wood Carving.
- Ian Washburn – Drum Major, Devon and Somerset Ceremonial Unit, Devon and Somerset Fire and Rescue Services. For voluntary services to Music and Firefighters' Welfare.
- Christopher West – Manager and chair, Disability Network Advisory Group, National Crime Agency. For services to Equality and Diversity Issues.
- Sandra Anne White – for services to Elderly People in Shirehampton, Bristol.
- David Anthony Whiteley – Coxswain, Hoylake Lifeboat, RNLI. For services to Maritime Safety.
- Mark Sheldon Whitfield – for voluntary service to People and Animals Abroad.
- Sheila Helen Mary Whitty – Board Member, Circle Housing. For services to the community in Surrey.
- Dr Adrian Charles Whitwood – Departmental Computing Officer and X-Ray Crystallographer, University of York. For services to Scientific Research and to St John Ambulance in Selby.
- Linda Whitworth – for services to the community in Blackpool, Lancashire.
- The Reverend Heather Susan Widdows – Vicar, St. Maelrubha's Episcopal Church, Poolewe. For services to the community in Gairloch, Ross-shire.
- Barbara Jean Wilkins – Owner, Jack and Jill Pre-school, Essex. For services to Children and Families.
- Lynn Willmott – Volunteering Development Manager, Mottisfont Abbey. For voluntary services to Heritage in Hampshire.
- Ronald Wiltshire – for services to charitable Fundraising.
- Frances Mary Winterflood – for voluntary service to Young People in Lancashire through the Duke of Edinburgh's Award Scheme.
- Deborah Wolfe – Data Protection Manager, Police Service of Northern Ireland. For services to Policing and the community in Northern Ireland.
- Raymond Derek Wood – for services to the community in the London Borough of Redbridge.
- Hazel Dawn Woodbridge – for services to Carriage Driving in Wiltshire.
- Robin Basil Woodd – for services to the community in Hemel Hempstead particularly through the Samaritans and St. Mary's Church.
- Alison Wrigley – Director, Just So Singers Choir, Surrey. For services to Education.

==== Diplomatic Service And Overseas List ====
- Allan Joseph Alman – Performing Arts Promoter and Benefactor, Gibraltar. For services to music and to the community in Gibraltar.
- Alice Ballard – Volunteer Prison Visitor, Taipei. For services to British and foreign prisoners in Taiwan.
- Roger John Barlow – chairman, Royal British Legion, Chile. For services to the British community and veterans in Chile.
- Robin Terry Brown – chairman, Telecoms Eastern European Challenge. For services to improving the lives of children in vulnerable communities in Moldova.
- Hamish Roy Douglas – chairman, Anglo-Bavarian Club. For services to British commercial interests in Germany.
- Bridget Galsworthy Estavillo – Writer and Historian. For services to the heritage of the Cornish community in Mexico.
- Alan Frank Harrisson – Volunteer Caseworker, Royal British Legion. For services to the Royal British Legion in the Republic of Ireland.
- Sarah Bronwen Jones – Founder and director, Children of Fire. For services to young survivors of burn injuries in Africa.
- Christine Ogle Hall Marigonda – Secretary, Circolo Italo-Britannico, Venice. For services to the British-Italian community in Venice, Italy.
- Barbara Ann Patterson – Community and Charity volunteer. For services to the British community, the elderly and ex-servicemen and women in Spain.
- Anthony William (Tony) Porter – chief executive officer, Oasis Cars. For services to the British community in Qatar.
- David Graham Thomas – President, Safe Communities, Portugal. For services to crime prevention and awareness within the British and international community in Portugal.
- Russell Adrian Vickers – Residence Manager, British Embassy, Baghdad. For services to British/Iraqi relations.
- Rachel Mary Williamson – District Nursing Sister, Falkland Islands. For services to the community in the Falkland Islands.

=== Queen's Police Medal (QPM) ===
Ribbon bar of the Queen's Police Medal for Merit, as awarded for Distinguished Service

England and Wales

- Simon Robert Bailey. Chief constable, Norfolk constabulary.
- Simon Byrne. Chief constable, Cheshire constabulary.
- Steven Craddock. Former detective sergeant, West Midlands police.
- Ian Christopher Dyson. Assistant commissioner, City of London police.
- Alan Humphries. Former neighbourhood inspector, Greater Manchester police.
- Neil Hibberd. Detective sergeant, Metropolitan police.
- Martin Jelley. Chief Constable, Warwickshire police.
- Claire Michelle Johnston. Chief superintendent, Metropolitan police.
- Sarah King. Sergeant, Metropolitan police.
- Timothy Madgwick. Deputy chief constable, North Yorkshire police.
- Paul Clifford Morrison. Formerly chief superintendent, Sussex and Surrey police.
- Keith Niven. Detective chief superintendent, Metropolitan police.
- Zuleika Payne. Constable, South Yorkshire police.
- Olivia Clare Pinkney. Deputy chief constable, Sussex police.
- Gareth Pritchard. Deputy chief constable, North Wales police.
- Andrew Rhodes. Deputy chief constable, Lancashire constabulary.
- Darren Tuthill. Constable, Metropolitan police.
- Martin Smith-Wightman. Constable, Metropolitan police.

Scotland

- Eleanor Mitchell. Chief superintendent, Police Scotland.
- Andrew Morris. Chief superintendent, Police Scotland.
- Louise Raphael. Detective superintendent, Police Scotland.

Northern Ireland

- Alan Alfred Dickson. Temporary detective chief inspector, PSNI.
- Eric Raymond Murray. Chief superintendent, PSNI.
- Philip Heatley Shepherd. Inspector, PSNI.

=== Queen's Fire Service Medal (QFSM) ===
Ribbon bar of the Queen's Fire Service Medal for Merit, as awarded for Distinguished Service

England and Wales

- David Stanley Brown. Director of operations prevention and response, London Fire Brigade
- Thomas Capeling. Chief fire officer, Tyne and Wear Fire and Rescue Service.
- Simon Gerald Routh-Jones. Chief fire officer, Wiltshire Fire and Rescue Service
- David Roger Walton. Assistant chief fire officer, West Yorkshire Fire and Rescue Service.

Scotland

- Peter Murray. Assistant chief officer, Scottish Fire and Rescue Service.
- Sarah O'Donnell. Director of finance and contractual Services, Scottish Fire and Rescue Service.

Jersey

- Mark Charles James. Chief fire officer, states of Jersey Fire and Rescue Service.

=== Queen's Ambulance Service Medal (QAM) ===
Ribbon bar of the Queen's Ambulance Service Medal for Merit, as awarded for Distinguished Service

England and Wales

- Colin Robert Jeffery. Head of operations, Hywel Dda area, Welsh Ambulance Service.
- Stephen Payne. Former paramedic, South East Coast Ambulance Service NHS foundation trust.
- David Whitmore. Senior clinical adviser, London Ambulance Service NHS trust.

Scotland

- Paul Bassett. General manager, Scottish Ambulance Service.

Northern Ireland

- Thomas McGarey. Risk manager, Northern Ireland Ambulance Service.

=== Queen's Volunteer Reserves Medal (QVRM) ===
Ribbon bar of the Queen's Volunteer Reserves Medal

- WO Class 2 Stephen John Davies. Royal Marines reserve
- Staff Sgt Alison Lesley Cartwright. The Royal Logistic Corps army reserve.
- Maj Simon Mervyn Cassells. The Royal Irish Regiment army reserve.
- Maj Michael Dean Deck. The Royal Logistic Corps army reserve.
- Capt William MacIsaac. General List army reserve.
- Sqn Ldr Francis Shannon. Royal Air Force reserve.

=== Associate Royal Red Cross (ARRC) ===
Ribbon bar of the Royal Red Cross

- Lt Cdr Suzanne Lorraine Gardner-Clark, Queen Alexandra's Royal Naval Nursing Service.
- Squadron Leader Therese Anne Bridgit Kelly-Raper, Royal Air Force

=== Overseas Territories Police Medal ===
Ribbon bar of the Overseas Territories Police Medal for Merit, as awarded for Meritorious Service

- Malcolm Figueras. Sergeant, Royal Gibraltar Police.
- William Pulham. Constable, Royal Gibraltar Police.

== Crown Dependencies ==
=== The Most Excellent Order of the British Empire ===
==== Officer of the Order of the British Empire (OBE) ====
Guernsey

- Howard Edward Roberts QC – for services to The Crown.

==== Member of the Order of the British Empire (MBE) ====
Isle of Man

- John Richard Aspden – for services to Financial Supervision.
- John Hugh Davidson – for services to Charities and to the Manx community.
- David Allan Vick – for services to Insurance and Pensions.

Jersey

- Philip Austin – for services to the community as the Chairman of the Organising Committee of the Island Games 2015.
- Clive Jones – for services to Jersey Heritage.

=== British Empire Medal (BEM) ===
Isle of Man

- Dorothea Lilian Gell – for services to the Manx community and to Charities.

Guernsey

- Richard Stephen Le Page – for services to the sport of Target Shooting in Guernsey.
- Katharine Ann Russell – for services to heritage and culture in Alderney and Normandy.

Jersey

- Angela Francey – for services to the reconciliation of the community of Jersey and of Bad Wurzach.
- Jean McLaughlin – for services to the recognition of Evacuees during the Occupation.

== Antigua and Barbuda ==
Below are the individuals appointed by Elizabeth II in her right as Queen of Antigua and Barbuda, on advice of her ministers in Antigua and Barbuda.

=== The Most Excellent Order of the British Empire ===
==== Member of the Order of the British Empire (MBE) ====
- Agnes Meeker – for services to St. John's Hospice and to the National Archives and Museum of Antigua and Barbuda.

== The Bahamas ==
Below are the individuals appointed by Elizabeth II in her right as Queen of The Bahamas, on advice of the Bahamian Government.

=== The Most Distinguished Order of Saint Michael and Saint George ===
==== Knight Commander of the Order of St Michael and St George (KCMG) ====
- Edward Charles Carter – for services to broadcasting and the media.
- Franklyn Roosevelt Wilson CMG – for services to business and philanthropy.

==== Companion of the Order of St Michael and St George (CMG) ====
- Dr. Leonard A. Johnson – for services to the church.

=== The Most Excellent Order of the British Empire ===
==== Dame Commander of the Order of the British Empire (DBE) ====
- Justice Anita Mildred Allen – for services to the Bahamas Court of Appeal and Judiciary.

==== Officer of the Order of the British Empire (OBE) ====
- Cleophas R.E. Adderley – for services to music.
- James Catalyn – for services to culture and acting.
- The Reverend Dr. Philip Arthur Rahming JP – for civic service and services to religion.
- Telator Cumi Strachan – for services to crafts and entrepreneurism.

==== Member of the Order of the British Empire (MBE) ====
- Thomas A. Basden – for services to business and commerce.
- Joshua Emerald Culmer JP – for services to civic affairs and community development.
- Romeo Farrington – for services to business and to tourism.
- Dennis Hall – for services to the community.
- George Gilbert E. Pinder – for services to commerce and fishing.
- The Reverend Dr. Marina Princess Sands – for services to the community and to religion.
- Ansil Saunders – for services to the historic and cultural development of the island of Bimini.

=== British Empire Medal (BEM) ===
- Hilton Alexander Bowleg – for services to the community.
- Carmetta Burns – for community development and social services.
- Doris Farah – for community development and social services.
- Everette Ferguson – for services to sport.
- The Reverend Revy Francis – for services to the community through religion and civic service.
- Curtis Dazel Hanna – for services to business and commerce.
- Sister Agatha Hunt – for services to religion and to education.

=== Queen's Police Medal (QPM) ===
- Hulan Hanna – for services to the Royal Bahamas Police Force.
- Steven Seymour – for services to the Royal Bahamas police Force.

== Barbados ==
Below are the individuals appointed by Elizabeth II in her right as Queen of Barbados, on advice of the Barbadian Government.

=== Knight Bachelor ===
- Paul Bernard Altman – for services to the preservation of historic building and real estate development.

== Belize ==
Below are the individuals appointed by Elizabeth II in her right as Queen of Belize, on advice of the Belizean Government.

=== The Most Distinguished Order of Saint Michael and Saint George ===
==== Companion of the Order of St Michael and St George (CMG) ====
- Michael Harwell Manfield Bowen – for services to business and industry.

=== The Most Excellent Order of the British Empire ===
==== Officer of the Order of the British Empire (OBE) ====
- Dilcia Christina Feinstein – for services to business and the community.
- Eleanor Rubina Herrera Hulse – for services to education.

==== Member of the Order of the British Empire (MBE) ====
- Emelda Leticia August – for services to nursing.
- Janet Patricia Gibson – for services to environmental protection.
- Dr Aaron Paul Lewis – for services to science.
- Juan Cansillo Nunez – for services to education and to sport.
- Sarita Elena Westby – for services to education and to the community.

== Grenada ==
Below are the individuals appointed by Elizabeth II in her right as Queen of Grenada, on advice of the Grenadian Government.

=== Order of Saint Michael and Saint George ===
==== Knight / Dame Commander of the Order of St Michael and St George (KCMG / DCMG) ====
- Justice Lyle Kevin St. Paul – for public service and services to the Judiciary

=== The Most Excellent Order of the British Empire ===
==== Officer of the Order of the British Empire (OBE) ====
- Dr. Chamarthy Subbarao – for services to the Medical Profession.

==== Member of the Order of the British Empire (MBE) ====
- Willan Dewsbury – for services to culture.
- Anna Margaret Wilson – for services to education and to the community.

=== British Empire Medal (BEM) ===
Civil Division

- Luret Clarkson – for services to nursing and to trade unionism.
- Jean Lambert – for services to nursing.

== Saint Christopher and Nevis ==
Below are the individuals appointed by Elizabeth II in her right as Queen of Saint Kitts and Nevis, on advice of the Kittian and Nevisian Government.

=== The Most Excellent Order of the British Empire ===
==== Commander of the Order of the British Empire (CBE) ====
- Bishop Kelvin C. Jones – for services to the community in the field of religion.

==== Officer of the Order of the British Empire (OBE) ====
- Clarita Violetta Richards – for services to education, music and public administration.

==== Member of the Order of the British Empire (MBE) ====
- Ruperta Patricia Richards-Leader – for her contribution to the Health Care service.
- Keith Scarborough – for cultural and community service.

== Solomon Islands ==
Below are the individuals appointed by Elizabeth II in her right as Queen of the Solomon Islands, on advice of the Solomon Islands Government.

=== The Most Excellent Order of the British Empire ===
==== Officer of the Order of the British Empire (OBE) ====
- Robinson S. Fugui – for services to Government in the areas of Environmental Health and Community Development.

==== Member of the Order of the British Empire (MBE) ====
- Angeline Merle Aqorau – for services to the community and to the women of Solomon Islands.
- Alick Butula – for services to commerce and to Community Development.
- Chief Alfred Hairiu – for services to teaching, the Church, politics and to Community Development.

=== British Empire Medal (BEM) ===
Civil Division

- David Manea – for services to teaching and to Community Development.
- Allen Christian Tarai – for services to teaching and to Community Development.

=== Queen's Police Medal (QPM) ===
- Deputy Commissioner Juanita Matanga – for services to the Police and to Community Development.

== Tuvalu ==
Below are the individuals appointed by Elizabeth II in her right as Queen of Tuvalu, on advice of the Tuvalu Government.

=== The Most Excellent Order of the British Empire ===
==== Officer of the Order of the British Empire (OBE) ====
- The Honourable Namoliki Sualiki Neemia MBE – for public and community service.

==== Member of the Order of the British Empire (MBE) ====
- Rev. Elder Suamalie Naisali Tafaki Iosefa Naisali – for public and community service.
- Piita Polapola – for public and community service.
- Susana Semu Taafaki – for public and community service.

=== British Empire Medal (BEM) ===
Civil Division

- Andrew Paialii Ionatana – for public and community service.
- Matanile Iosefa – for public and community service.
- Roger Moresi – for public and community service.
