= Heuerman =

Heuerman is a surname of German origin, meaning "hired worker". It may refer to:

- Jeff Heuerman (born 1992), American professional football tight end
- Jonjo Heuerman (born 2002), English charity fundraiser
