= John Sumpter =

British ecotoxicologist

John Philip Sumpter OBE is a distinguished professor of Brunel University, UK. He is an ecotoxicologist, and was amongst the team that first discovered endocrine disruption in fish, and the role of endocrine disrupting chemicals. He also developed the yeast estrogen assay (YES).

In 2009, Sumpter received an honorary doctorate from ETH Zurich. He was appointed Officer of the Order of the British Empire (OBE) in the 2016 New Year Honours for services to ecotoxicology in the aquatic environment.

In 2024 Sumpter received an honorary doctorate from Bangor University for services to education. He he also completed his undergraduate and postgraduate degrees at University of Wales, Bangor.
