= Susan Jowett =

British education advisor

Dame Susan Jowett DBE is a British education advisor and former chief executive officer. In the 2016 New Year Honours, she was appointed a Dame Commander of the Order of the British Empire, for services to education.
