= Carmel McConnell =

British author and campaigner

Carmel Bridget McConnell MBE FRSA (born 17 August 1961) is a British author and campaigner, with a focus on child poverty, education and well-being.

== Biography ==
McConnell was born in Romford, Essex on 17 August 1961. Her parents are Gerald McConnell and Patricia Donaghey. She attended Sacred Heart Convent in Dagenham and received her MBA from Cass Business School. She was a technologist at BT from 1989 to 1994 and then a management consultant at Holistic Management from 1995 to 2001.

Previously a Greenham Common activist, McConnell was inspired to found the Magic Breakfast by the impact of hunger and poverty on children's school attainment in the East End of London. In 2001, she founded the social enterprise Magic Outcomes that engages businesses in supporting primary schools in deprived areas, and the children's food poverty charity Magic Breakfast. It provides free healthy breakfasts for UK primary schools where more than 35% of the pupils qualify for free school meals. The goal is to ensure that no child is too hungry to learn.

McConnell is a director of the UK School Food Trust, and a Fellow of the Royal Society of Arts. She has published five business management books. She is in a civil partnership with Catherine Purkiss.

== Awards and honours ==
- In April 2014, she was named as one of Britain's most influential women in the BBC Woman's Hour power list 2014.
- McConnell was appointed Member of the Order of the British Empire (MBE) in the 2016 New Year Honors for services to school food.
