= Jonjo Heuerman =

English charity fundraiser (born 2002)

Jonjo Heuerman BEM (born 2 January 2002) is an English charity fundraiser.

Inspired to start charity fundraising following the death of his grandmother in 2009 from bowel cancer, by 2015 Heuerman, from Dartford, Kent had raised over £400,000 for the Bobby Moore cancer fund. Aged 13 he was the youngest recipient of an award in the 2016 New Year Honours list when he was awarded the British Empire Medal.. In 2016 he walked and cycled from Germany to Wembley to mark the 50th anniversary of the 1966 World Cup win. Jonjo still fundraises to this day.

== Fund raising achievements ==
In 2014 Heuerman, an avid football fan and supporter of West Ham United, dribbled a football for 50 miles from Roots Hall the ground of Southend United to the Boleyn Ground, the home of West Ham. In 2015 he cycled 700 miles (1,100 km) to visit all of the Premier League football clubs in England returning to London for a 50 miles (80 km) walk between the Premier League clubs in London. His efforts were rewarded by British Prime minister, David Cameron who awarded Heuerman Britain's 230th Points of Light award.
