= Roger Kemp (engineer) =

British engineer and academic

Roger John Kemp MBE FREng CEng FIET is a professorial fellow in engineering at Lancaster University. He was engineering manager for the Docklands Light Railway in London and managed the design and development team at Eurostar.
