= Vestibule (architecture) =

Small room leading into a larger space

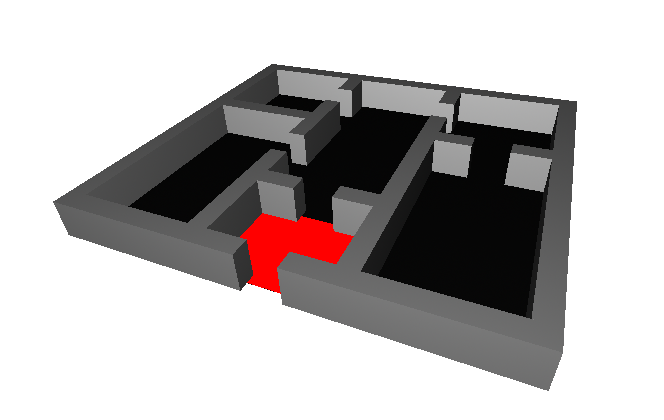
A floor plan with a modern vestibule shown in red

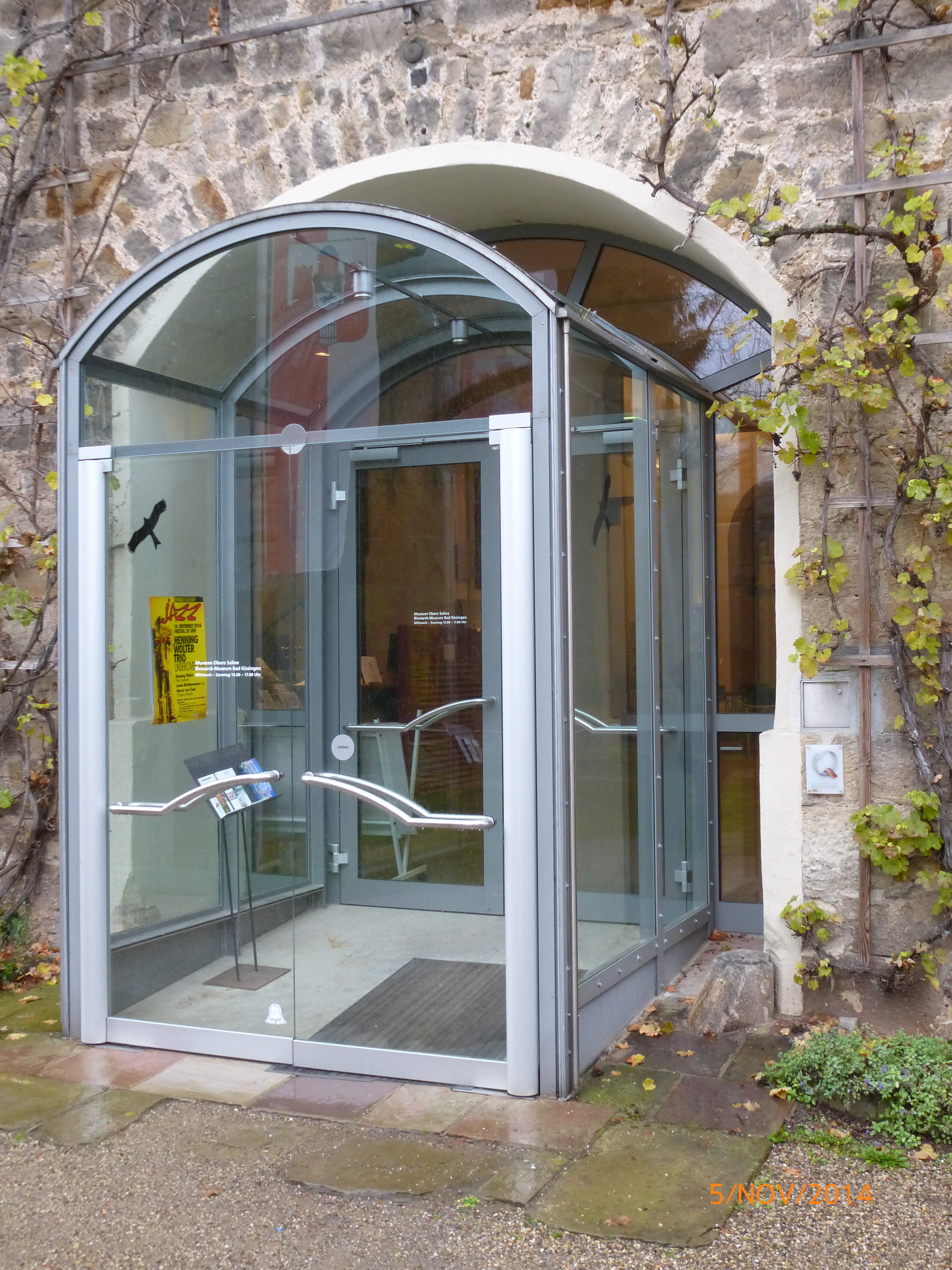
Vestibule in Germany.

A vestibule (also anteroom, antechamber, outer room, windbreak room, air-lock entry, or foyer) is a small room leading into a larger space such as a lobby, entrance hall, or passage, for the purpose of waiting, withholding the larger space from view, reducing heat loss (air trap, windbreak), providing storage space for outdoor clothing (mudroom), etc. The term applies to structures in both modern and classical architecture since ancient times.

In antiquity, antechambers were employed as transitional spaces leading to more significant rooms, such as throne rooms in palaces or the naos in temples. In ancient Roman architecture, a vestibule (Latin: vestibulum) was a partially enclosed area between the interior of the house and the street.

In modern architecture, a vestibule is typically a small room next to the outer door and connecting it with the interior of the building. In Christian churches, the same area is known as the narthex.

== Ancient usage ==
=== Ancient Greece ===
Vestibules were common in ancient Greek temples. Due to the construction techniques available at the time, it was not possible to build large spans. Consequently, many entranceways had two rows of columns that supported the roof and created a distinct space around the entrance.

In ancient Greek houses, the prothyrum was the space just outside the door of a house, which often had an altar to Apollo or a statue, or a laurel tree.

In elaborate houses or palaces, the vestibule could be divided into three parts, the prothyron (πρόθυρον), the thyroreion (θυρωρεῖον; lit. 'porter's lodge'), and the proaulion (προαύλιον).

The vestibule in ancient Greek homes served as a barrier to the outside world, and also added security to discourage unwanted entrance into the home and unwanted glances into the home. The vestibule's alignment at right angles of private interior spaces, and the use of doors and curtains also added security and privacy from the outside. The Classical Period marked a change in the need for privacy in Greek society, which ultimately led to the design and use of vestibules in Greek homes.

=== Ancient Rome ===
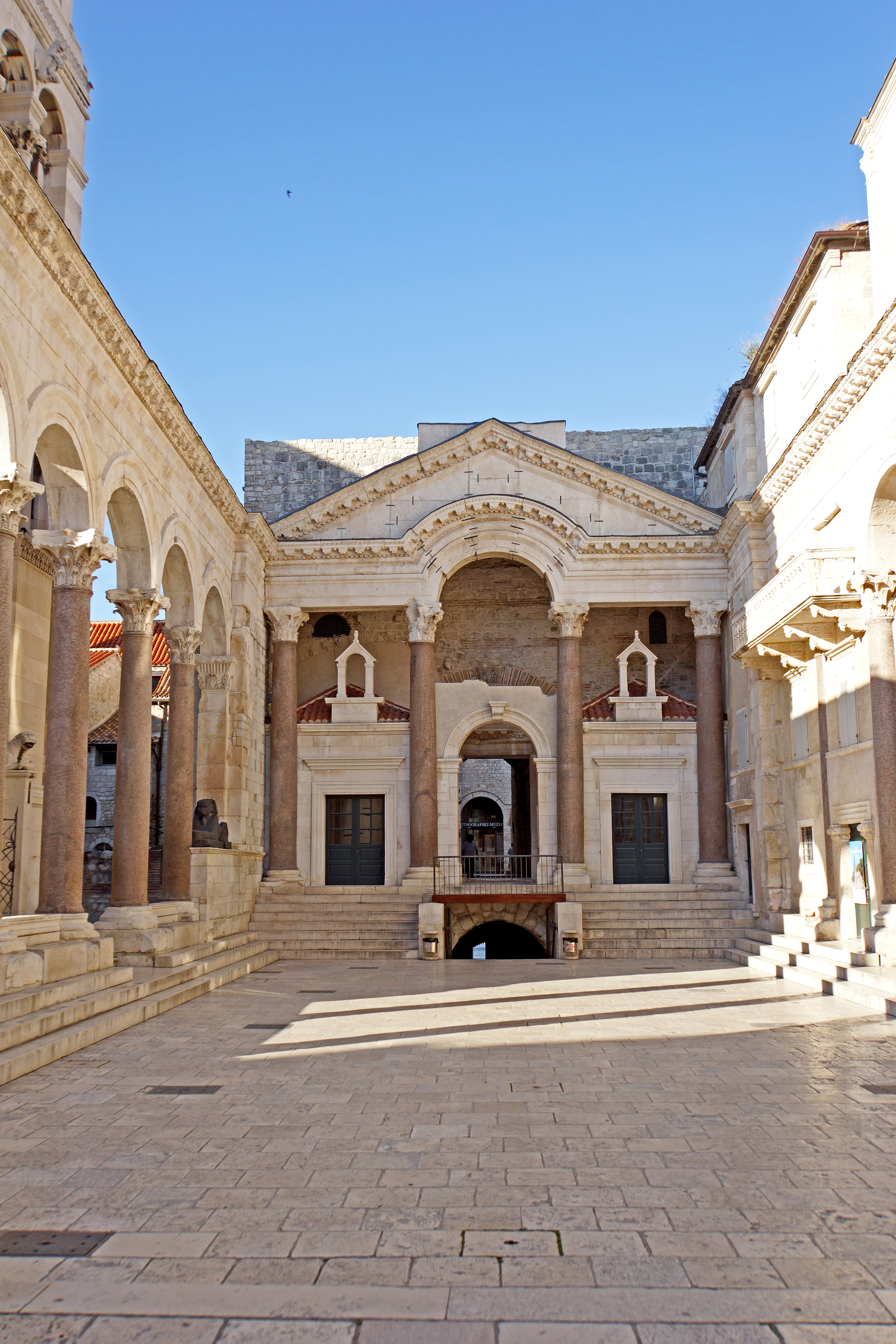
Prothyron of Diocletian's Palace (Split, Croatia), leading to the Vestibule

In ancient Roman architecture, where the term originates, a vestibule (Latin: vestibulum) was a space that was sometimes present between the interior fauces of a building leading to the atrium and the street. Vestibules were common in ancient architecture. A Roman house was typically divided into two different sections: the first front section, or the public part, was introduced with a vestibule. These vestibules contained two rooms, which usually served as waiting rooms or a porters' lodge where visitors could get directions or information. Upon entering a Roman house or domus, one would have to pass through the vestibule before entering the fauces, which led to the atrium.

The structure was a mixture between a modern hall and porch.

== Church architecture ==
In the architecture of Christian churches, the vestibule is known as the narthex. In early Christian architecture, the vestibule replaced the more extravagant atrium or quadriporticus in favor of a more simplified area to house the vase of holy water. From the 5th century onward, churches of Eastern and Western Christianity utilized vestibules. In European Roman Catholic churches, the purpose of the vestibule was not to provide a resting place for penitents, but to deaden the noise from outside. In western Europe, it was generally a narrow, open antechamber with a sloping roof. In the East, especially in Syria, this antechamber was given a fine façade and flanked by two towers.

In medieval Italy, the simple open chamber with sloping roof was common. North of the Alps, however, the vestibule developed into a projecting structure united with the main building, recalling the Syrian churches. The method of construction shown in the Palatine Chapel in Aachen, an ante-structure of several stories between the two western round towers, was adopted in the early Romanesque period, especially by the Cluniac monks. The Romanesque architecture also made use of a covered ante-structure placed before the west front. This style was first used on a large scale at Speyer Cathedral, where the vestibule has three stories.

In Italy, the architecture of the Renaissance and of the Rococo style used the vestibule. Architect Leon Battista Alberti considered its use necessary on all occasions. The basilicas of Saint John Lateran and Santa Maria Maggiore received new porticoes, constructed as covered galleries (loggias) in two stories. The Carmelite church at Arezzo has a vestibule with columns built by Benedetto da Majano.

== Palace architecture ==
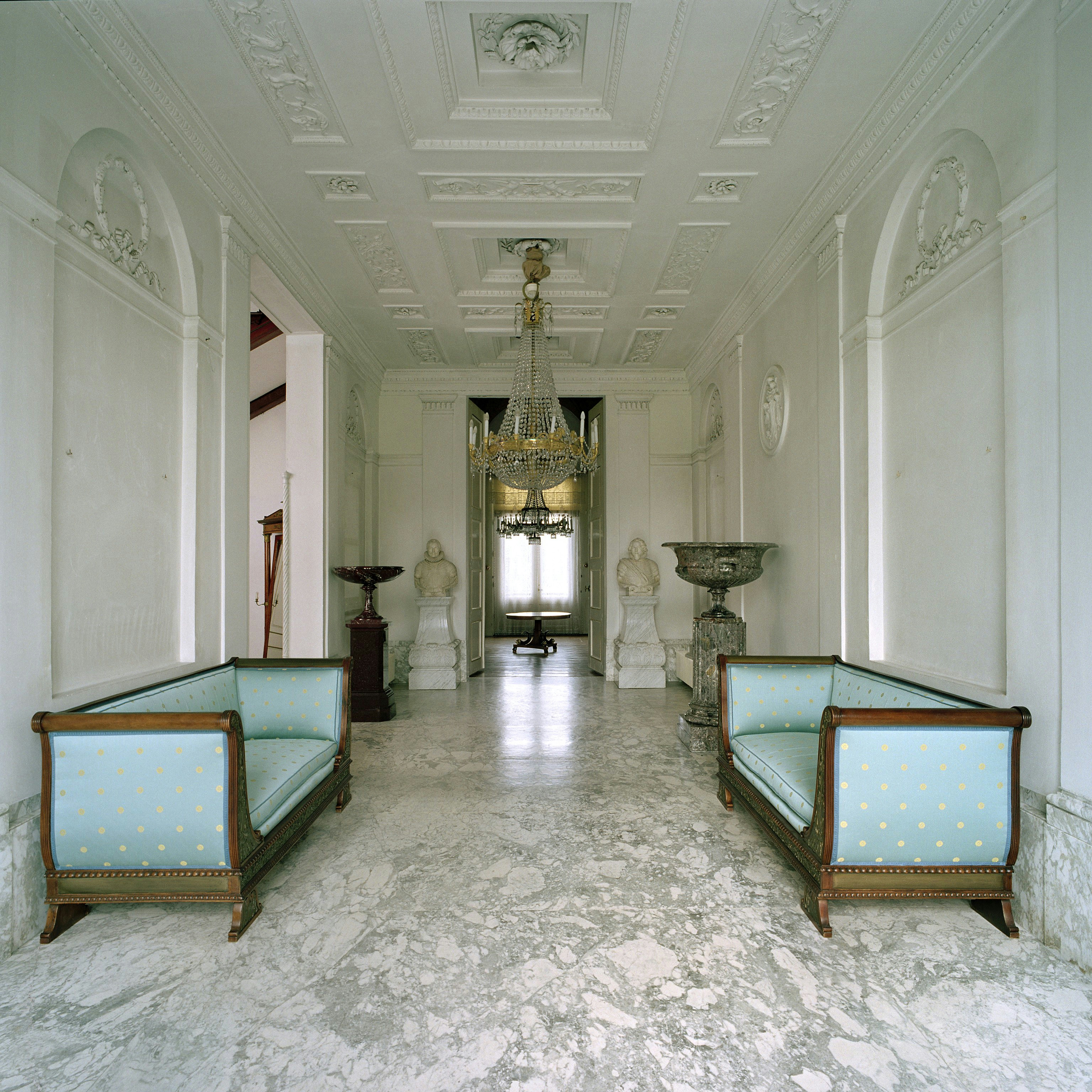
The Vestibule in Palace Soestdijk in Baarn, (the Netherlands)

Vestibules are common in palace architecture. The style of vestibule used in Genoa, Italy, was transformed from a previously modest design to a more ornamental structure, which satisfied Genoese aristocracy, while becoming an influential transformation for Italian palaces. The Genoese vestibule became a prominent feature of their palace architecture. These vestibules would sometimes include a fountain or large statue. The Genoese vestibule was large and exaggerated, and seemed "rather designed to accommodate a race of giants".

== Modern usage ==
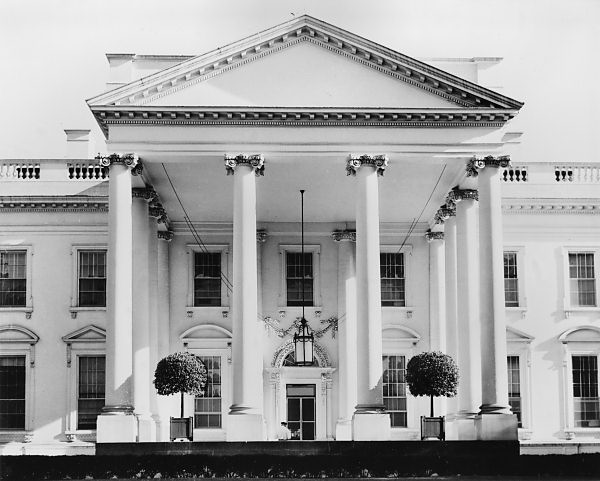
North portico of the White House (Washington, D.C.). The vestibule is just inside the exterior doors.

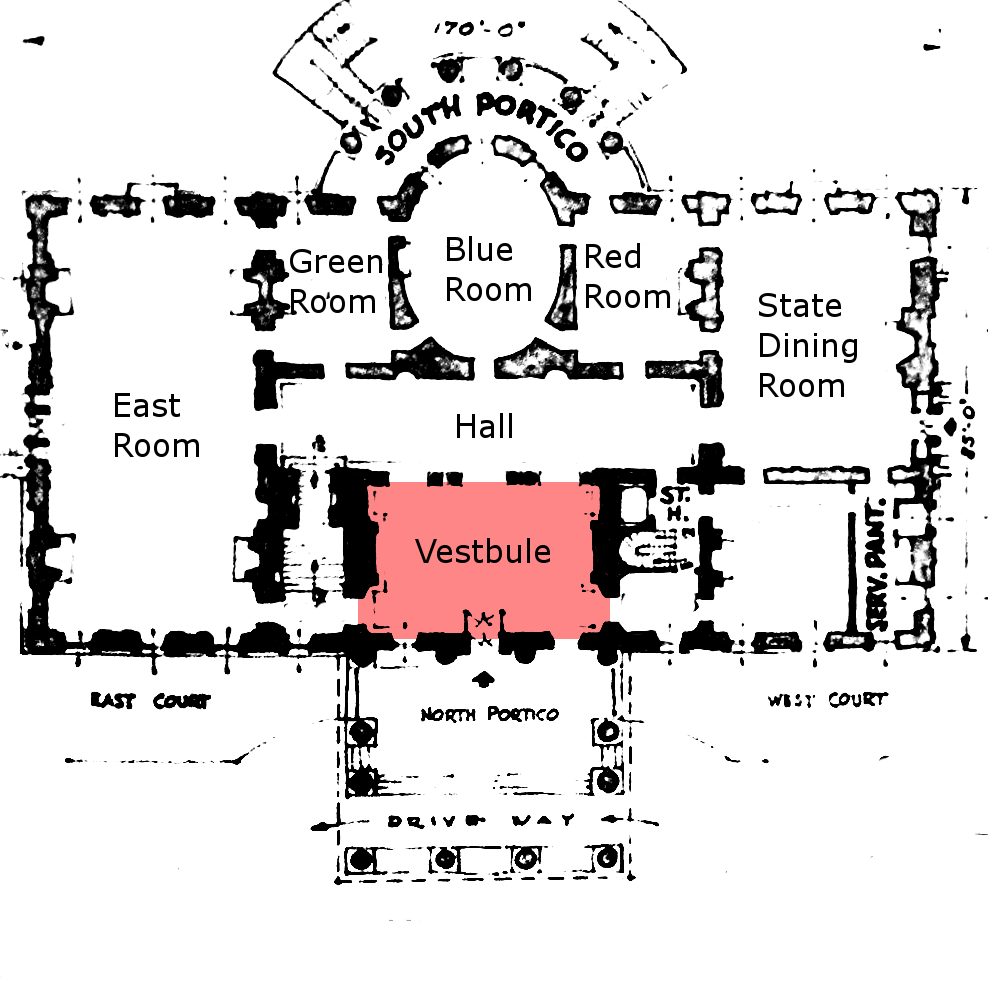
Plan of the White House with the vestibule shown in red

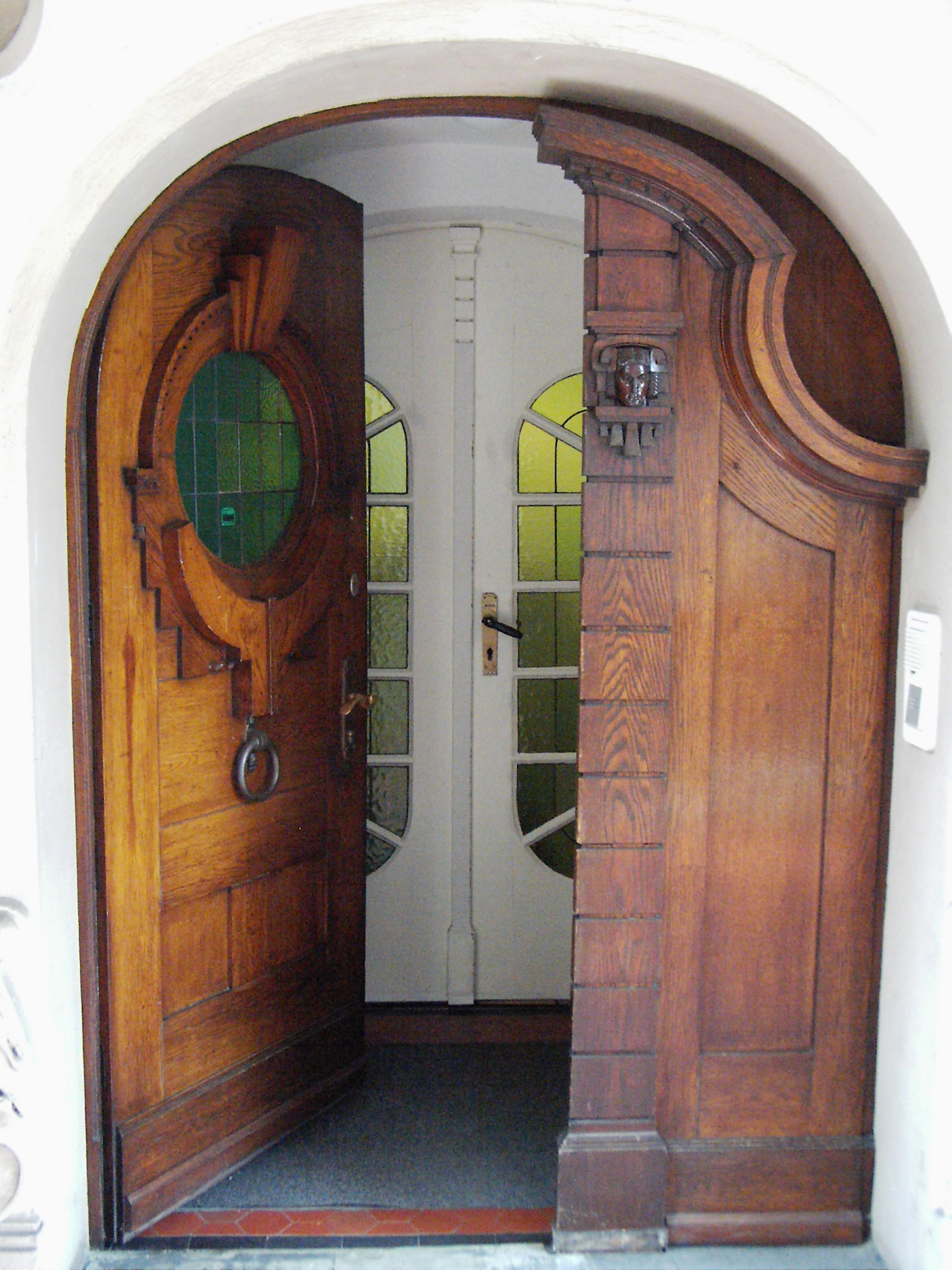
Entrance to a house with small vestibule

In modern usage, the term vestibule refers to a small room or antechamber between a building's entrance and main hall; it can also refer to the anteroom of any large apartment. Often it connects the doorway to a lobby or passage. It is the space one occupies once passing the door, but not yet in the main interior of the building.

Although vestibules such as a modified mud room are common in private residences, they are especially prevalent in more opulent buildings, such as government ones, designed to elicit a sense of grandeur by contrasting the vestibule's small space with the following greater one, and by adding the aspect of anticipation. The residence of the White House in the United States is such an example. At the north portico, it contains a tiny vestibule between the doors flushed with the outer and inner faces of the exterior wall of, and in the past inside, the Entrance Hall (called incorrectly Vestibule) separated from the not much bigger Cross Hall by just 2 double columns. The difference in sizes between a vestibule and the following space is better illustrated by the—so called—entrance (15) to the main gallery in the Solomon R. Guggenheim Museum by Frank Lloyd Wright. Many government buildings mimic the classical architecture from which the vestibule originates.

A purely utilitarian use of vestibules in modern buildings is to create an airlock entry. Such vestibules consist of a set of inner doors and a set of outer doors, the intent being to reduce air infiltration to the building by having only one set of doors open at any given time.

=== ATM vestibule ===
An ATM vestibule is an enclosed area with an automated teller machine (ATM) that is attached to the outside of a building, but typically features no further entrance to the building and is not accessible from within. There may be a secure entrance to the vestibule which requires a card to open.

ATM vestibules may also contain security devices, such as panic alarms and closed-circuit television to help prevent criminal activity.

=== Railway use ===
The vestibule on a railway car is an enclosed area at the end of the car body, usually separated from the main part of the interior by a door, which is power-operated on most modern equipment. Entrance to and exit from the car is through the side doors, which lead into the vestibule. When passenger cars are coupled, their vestibules are joined by mating faceplate and diaphragm assemblies to create a weather-tight seal for the safety and comfort of passengers who are stepping from car to car. In British usage the term refers to the part of the carriage where the passenger doors are located; this can be at the ends of the carriage (on long-distance stock) or at the 1/4 and 3/4 of length positions (typical on modern suburban stock).

=== Commercial buildings ===
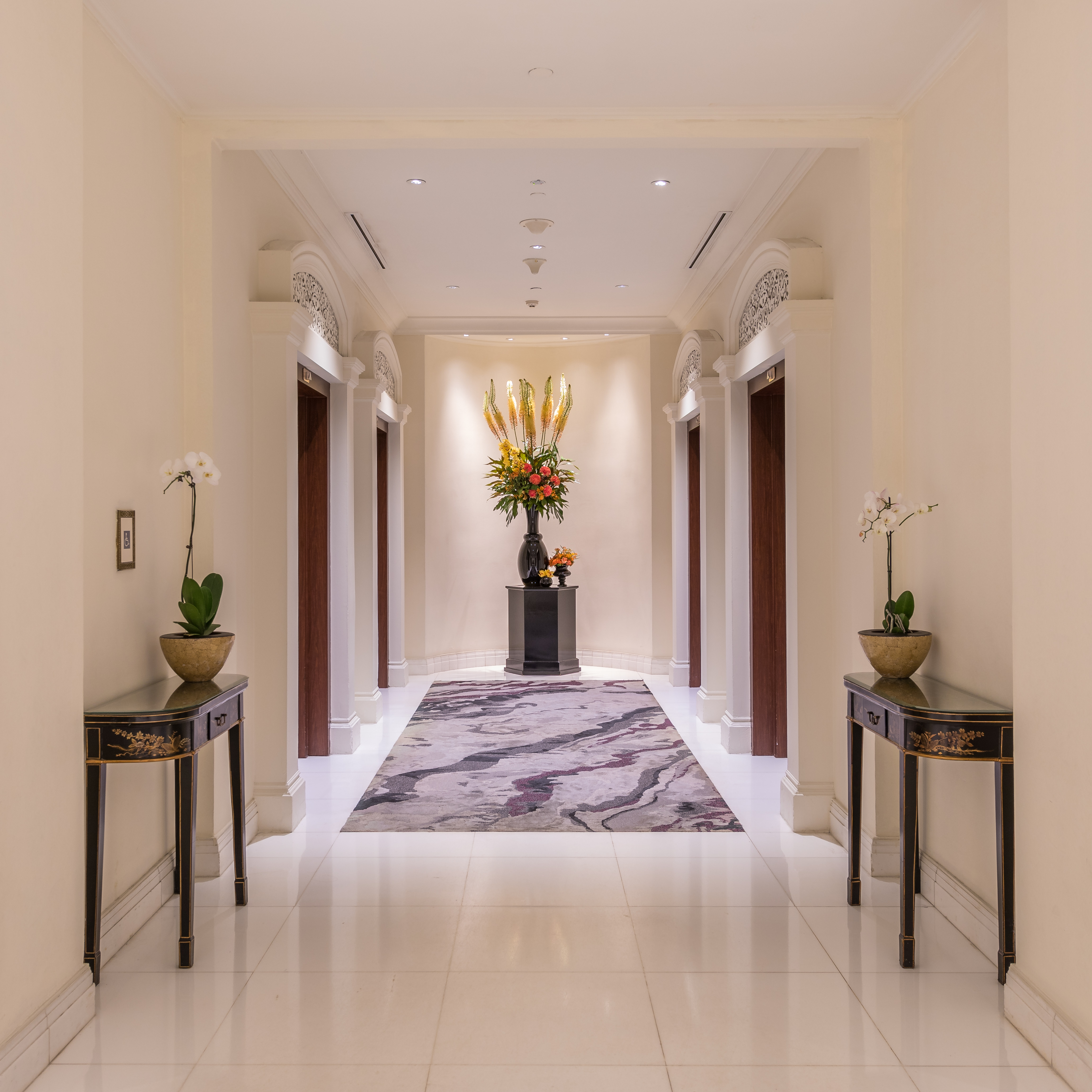
Elevator vestibule at the InterContinental Hotel, Singapore

The U.S. Department of Energy Building Energy Codes Program released a publication in 2012 detailing the requirements of a vestibule to be used in commercial buildings. The publication states it requires vestibules to reduce the amount of air that infiltrates a space in order to aid in energy conservation, as well as increasing comfort near entrance doors. By creating an air lock entry, vestibules reduce infiltration losses or gains caused by wind.

Designers of commercial buildings must install a vestibule between the main entry doors leading to spaces that are greater than or equal to 3,000 square feet (280 m^{2}). One other requirement of the design is that it is not necessary for both sets of door to be open in order to pass through the vestibule, and they should have devices that allow for self-closing.

An example of such is in New York City where in the winter, temporary sidewalk vestibules are commonly placed in front of entrances to restaurants to reduce cold drafts from reaching customers inside.

== See also ==
- Antarala – vestibule in certain Hindu temples
- Genkan – entryway area in Japanese buildings
- Propylaeum – monumental gateway in Ancient Greek architecture
- Revolving door – used for similar functions
