= Philip Wolfe (engineer) =

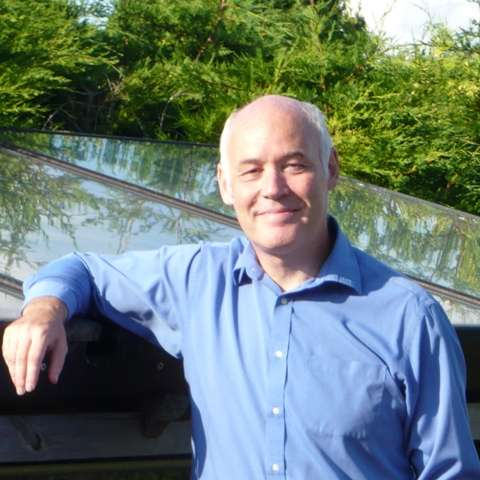
- Philip Wolfe in 2012
- Born: 1950 (age 75–76); Maidenhead, United Kingdom
- Education: Master of Arts in Engineering, Cambridge University
- Occupations: Renewable energy developer, author

Philip Rowland Wolfe MBE is one of the pioneers of the British renewable energy sector.

He first became involved in the 1970s, leading various photovoltaics companies until the turn of the century. As Director-General of the Renewable Energy Association he led the campaign for Feed-in Tariffs and the Renewable Heat Incentive.

He has written many publications and is responsible for a number of innovations and initiatives.

He was appointed Member of the Order of the British Empire (MBE) in the 2016 New Year Honours for services to renewable energy and the energy sector.

== Sustainable energy policy ==
The campaign for the introduction of the Renewable Heat Incentive and Feed-in tariffs in the United Kingdom was led by Friends of the Earth and the Renewable Energy Association, when Philip Wolfe was Director General, between 2003 and 2009. He edited the first blueprint for these measures to assist early government drafting.

He first proposed the Energy hierarchy, and initiated the consumer assurance REAL Code (since renamed Renewable Energy Consumer Code) for microgeneration.

== Renewable energy industry ==
As general manager of Lucas Industries' solar power subsidiary in the early 1970s, Philip Wolfe negotiated the joint venture with BP to create what became BP Solar and was its first Chief Executive.

He was a founding director of the European Photovoltaic Industry Association (EPIA, since renamed Solar Power Europe) and its third President from 1987 to 1989. He was a founding director of the Renewable Energy Association and its Director General from 2002 to 2009.

He is an expert on solar parks and has pioneered their introduction in the UK. Following the publication of his book on the subject, he founded the information resource on utility-scale solar power, Wiki-Solar. A series of articles in 2019 explained the differences between individual power plants, solar parks and clusters, and identified the largest in the world at the time.

== Community Energy ==
His background in utility-scale solar power led to Wolfe's involvement in the community sector when he was appointed as chairman of Westmill Solar Co-operative and led the public offering and acquisition of the world's largest community-owned solar power station.

He was subsequently involved in the creation of Community Energy England, to represent the community energy sector in the United Kingdom, and was its first elected chairman in 2014. He was a member of the British government's Shared Ownership Taskforce, and appointed its vice-chair in 2015.

== Innovation ==
Amongst Philip Wolfe's innovations were the UK's first: grid-connected solar power station at Marchwood, building-integrated renewables at Energy World in Milton Keynes (opened by then Prime Minister, Margaret Thatcher), and solar roofing slate.

== Publications ==
=== Books ===
The Solar Generation, Wiley-IEEE

Solar Photovoltaic Projects in the mainstream energy market, Routledge

Sustainable Energy Options for business, DōShorts

=== Policy papers ===
Energy hierarchy

Priorities for low carbon transition, The Policy Network

Preliminary blueprint: Feed-in Tariffs and Renewable Heat Incentive, Renewable Energy Association
