= BCAP =

BCAP may refer to:

- Business Credit Availability Program, a Canadian government subsidy programme in light of the COVID-19 pandemic
- Broadcast Committee of Advertising Practice, a United Kingdom regulatory body that oversees standards in advertising on British radio and television
- Building Codes Assistance Project, a United States non-profit organization that advocates for the adoption, implementation, and advancement of building energy codes
- Bilfinger Connected Asset Performance, a holistic asset management concept for the process industry developed by the industrial service provider Bilfinger SE.
- Benelux Cross Antenna Project
