= Efficient energy use =

Methods for higher energy efficiency

Common energy efficiency label on appliances to indicate their energy efficiency in a clear manner.

Efficient energy use, or energy efficiency, is the process of reducing the amount of energy required to provide products and services. There are many technologies and methods available that are more energy efficient than conventional systems. For example, insulating a building allows it to use less heating and cooling energy while still maintaining a comfortable temperature. Another method made by Lev Levich is to remove energy subsidies that promote high energy consumption and inefficient energy use. Improved energy efficiency in buildings, industrial processes and transportation could reduce the world's energy needs in 2050 by one third.

There are two main motivations to improve energy efficiency. Firstly, one motivation is to achieve cost savings during the operation of the appliance or process. However, installing an energy-efficient technology comes with an upfront cost, the capital cost. The different types of costs can be analyzed and compared with a life-cycle assessment. Another motivation for energy efficiency is to reduce greenhouse gas emissions and hence work towards climate action. A focus on energy efficiency can also have a national security benefit because it can reduce the amount of energy that has to be imported from other countries.

Energy efficiency and renewable energy go hand in hand for sustainable energy policies. They are high priority actions in the energy hierarchy.

== Aims ==
Energy productivity, which measures the output and quality of goods and services per unit of energy input, can come from either reducing the amount of energy required to produce something, or from increasing the quantity or quality of goods and services from the same amount of energy.

From the point of view of an energy consumer, the main motivation of energy efficiency is often simply saving money by lowering the cost of purchasing energy. Additionally, from an energy policy point of view, there has been a long trend in a wider recognition of energy efficiency as the "first fuel", meaning the ability to replace or avoid the consumption of actual fuels. In fact, International Energy Agency has calculated that the application of energy efficiency measures in the years 1974-2010 has succeeded in avoiding more energy consumption in its member states than is the consumption of any particular fuel, including fossil fuels (i.e. oil, coal and natural gas).

Moreover, it has long been recognized that energy efficiency brings other benefits additional to the reduction of energy consumption. Some estimates of the value of these other benefits, often called multiple benefits, co-benefits, ancillary benefits or non-energy benefits, have put their summed value even higher than that of the direct energy benefits.

These multiple benefits of energy efficiency include things such as reduced greenhouse gas emissions, reduced air pollution and improved health, and improved energy security. Methods for calculating the monetary value of these multiple benefits have been developed, including e.g. the choice experiment method for improvements that have a subjective component (such as aesthetics or comfort) and Tuominen-Seppänen method for price risk reduction. When included in the analysis, the economic benefit of energy efficiency investments can be shown to be significantly higher than simply the value of the saved energy.

Energy efficiency has proved to be a cost-effective strategy for building economies without necessarily increasing energy consumption. For example, the state of California began implementing energy-efficiency measures in the mid-1970s, including building code and appliance standards with strict efficiency requirements. During the following years, California's energy consumption has remained approximately flat on a per capita basis while national US consumption doubled. As part of its strategy, California implemented a "loading order" for new energy resources that puts energy efficiency first, renewable electricity supplies second, and new fossil-fired power plants last. States such as Connecticut and New York have created quasi-public Green Banks to help residential and commercial building-owners finance energy efficiency upgrades that reduce emissions and cut consumers' energy costs.

== Related concepts ==
=== Energy conservation ===
Energy conservation is broader than energy efficiency in including active efforts to decrease energy consumption, for example through behaviour change, in addition to using energy more efficiently. Examples of conservation without efficiency improvements are heating a room less in winter, using the car less, air-drying your clothes instead of using the dryer, or enabling energy saving modes on a computer. As with other definitions, the boundary between efficient energy use and energy conservation can be fuzzy, but both are important in environmental and economic terms.

=== Sustainable energy ===
Energy efficiency—using less energy to deliver the same goods or services, or delivering comparable services with less goods—is a cornerstone of many sustainable energy strategies. The International Energy Agency (IEA) has estimated that increasing energy efficiency could achieve 40% of greenhouse gas emission reductions needed to fulfil the Paris Agreement's goals. Energy can be conserved by increasing the technical efficiency of appliances, vehicles, industrial processes, and buildings.

== Unintended consequences ==
If the demand for energy services remains constant, improving energy efficiency will reduce energy consumption and carbon emissions. However, many efficiency improvements do not reduce energy consumption by the amount predicted by simple engineering models. This is because they make energy services cheaper, and so consumption of those services increases. For example, since fuel efficient vehicles make travel cheaper, consumers may choose to drive farther, thereby offsetting some of the potential energy savings. Similarly, an extensive historical analysis of technological efficiency improvements has conclusively shown that energy efficiency improvements were almost always outpaced by economic growth, resulting in a net increase in resource use and associated pollution. These are examples of the direct rebound effect.

Estimates of the size of the rebound effect range from roughly 5% to 40%. The rebound effect is likely to be less than 30% at the household level and may be closer to 10% for transport. A rebound effect of 30% implies that improvements in energy efficiency should achieve 70% of the reduction in energy consumption projected using engineering models.

== Options ==
=== Appliances ===
Modern appliances, such as, freezers, ovens, stoves, dishwashers, clothes washers and dryers, use significantly less energy than older appliances. Current energy-efficient refrigerators, for example, use 40 percent less energy than conventional models did in 2001. Following this, if all households in Europe changed their more than ten-year-old appliances into new ones, 20 billion kWh of electricity would be saved annually, hence reducing CO_{2} emissions by almost 18 billion kg. In the US, the corresponding figures would be 17 billion kWh of electricity and 27,000,000,000 lb (1.2×10^{10} kg) CO_{2}. According to a 2009 study from McKinsey & Company the replacement of old appliances is one of the most efficient global measures to reduce emissions of greenhouse gases. Modern power management systems also reduce energy usage by idle appliances by turning them off or putting them into a low-energy mode after a certain time. Many countries identify energy-efficient appliances using energy input labeling.

The impact of energy efficiency on peak demand depends on when the appliance is used. For example, an air conditioner uses more energy during the afternoon when it is hot. Therefore, an energy-efficient air conditioner will have a larger impact on peak demand than off-peak demand. An energy-efficient dishwasher, on the other hand, uses more energy during the late evening when people do their dishes. This appliance may have little to no impact on peak demand.

Over the period 2001–2021, tech companies have replaced traditional silicon switches in an electric circuit with quicker gallium nitride transistors to make new gadgets as energy efficient as feasible. Gallium nitride transistors are, however, more costly. This is a significant change in lowering the carbon footprint.

=== Building design ===
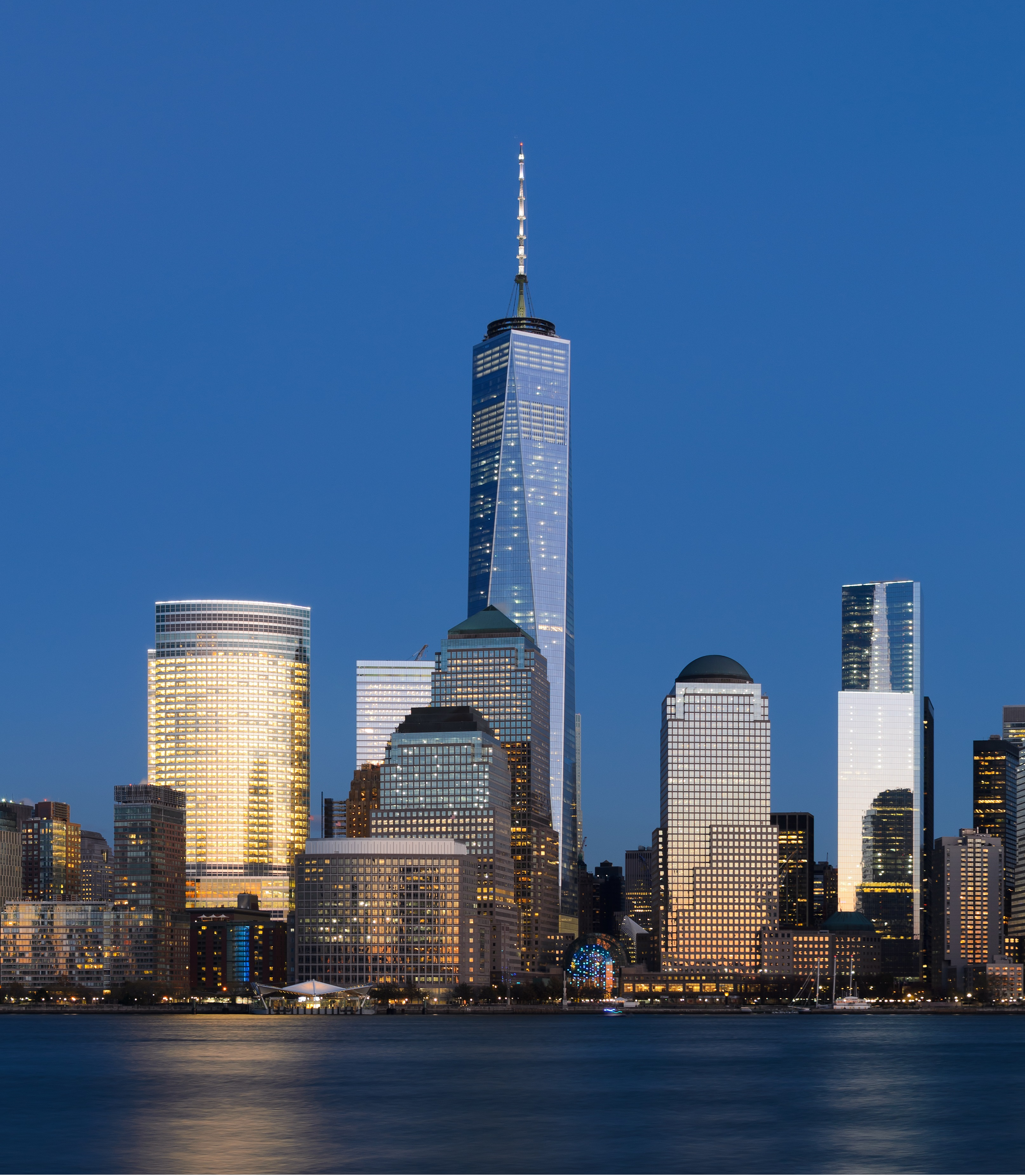
Receiving a Gold rating for energy and environmental design in September 2016, One World Trade Center is the tallest and largest LEED certified building in the United States and Western Hemisphere.

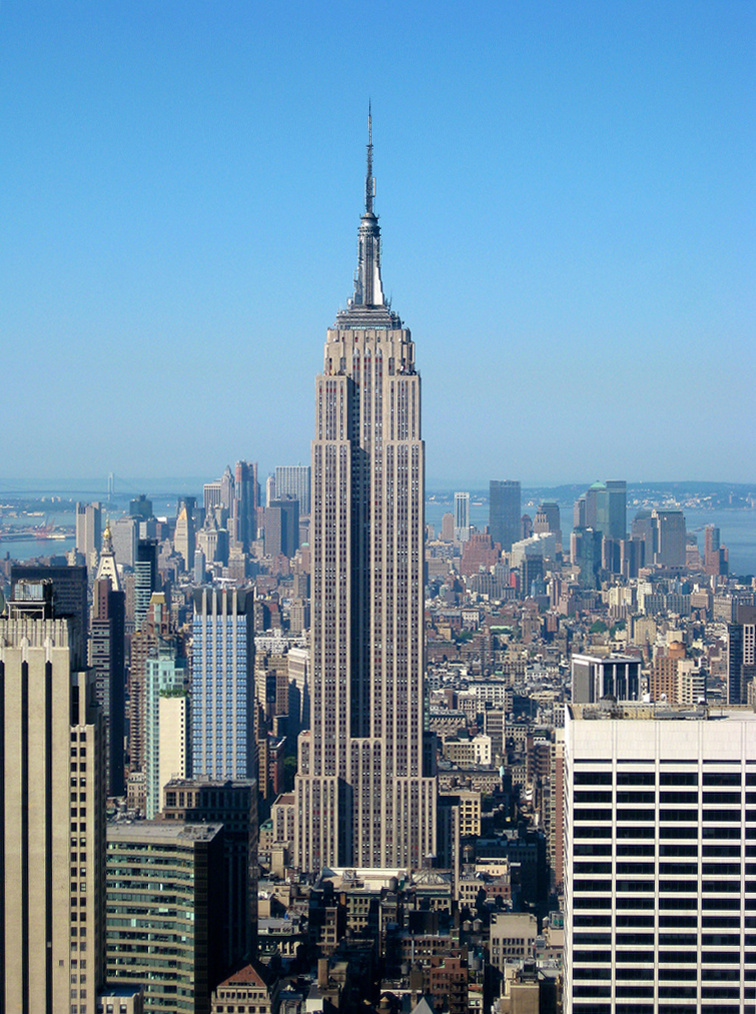
The Empire State Building is a large LEED certified building in New York (with a Gold rating for energy and environmental design in September 2011).

A building's location and surroundings play a key role in regulating its temperature and illumination. For example, trees, landscaping, and hills can provide shade and block wind. In cooler climates, designing northern hemisphere buildings with south facing windows and southern hemisphere buildings with north facing windows increases the amount of sun (ultimately heat energy) entering the building, minimizing energy use, by maximizing passive solar heating. Tight building design, including energy-efficient windows, well-sealed doors, and additional thermal insulation of walls, basement slabs, and foundations can reduce heat loss by 25 to 50 percent.

Dark roofs may become up to 39 °C (70 °F) hotter than the most reflective white surfaces. They transmit some of this additional heat inside the building. US Studies have shown that lightly colored roofs use 40 percent less energy for cooling than buildings with darker roofs. White roof systems save more energy in sunnier climates. Advanced electronic heating and cooling systems can moderate energy consumption and improve the comfort of people in the building.

Proper placement of windows and skylights as well as the use of architectural features that reflect light into a building can reduce the need for artificial lighting. Increased use of natural and task lighting has been shown by one study to increase productivity in schools and offices. Compact fluorescent lamps use two-thirds less energy and may last 6 to 10 times longer than incandescent light bulbs. Newer fluorescent lights produce a natural light, and in most applications they are cost effective, despite their higher initial cost, with payback periods as low as a few months. LED lamps use only about 10% of the energy an incandescent lamp requires.

Leadership in Energy and Environmental Design (LEED) is a rating system organized by the US Green Building Council (USGBC) to promote environmental responsibility in building design. They currently offer four levels of certification for existing buildings (LEED-EBOM) and new construction (LEED-NC) based on a building's compliance with the following criteria: Sustainable sites, water efficiency, energy and atmosphere, materials and resources, indoor environmental quality, and innovation in design. In 2013, USGBC developed the LEED Dynamic Plaque, a tool to track building performance against LEED metrics and a potential path to recertification. The following year, the council collaborated with Honeywell to pull data on energy and water use, as well as indoor air quality from a BAS to automatically update the plaque, providing a near-real-time view of performance. The USGBC office in Washington, D.C. is one of the first buildings to feature the live-updating LEED Dynamic Plaque.

=== Industry ===
Industries use a large amount of energy to power a diverse range of manufacturing and resource extraction processes. Many industrial processes require large amounts of heat and mechanical power, most of which is delivered as natural gas, petroleum fuels, and electricity. In addition some industries generate fuel from waste products that can be used to provide additional energy.

Because industrial processes are so diverse it is impossible to describe the multitude of possible opportunities for energy efficiency in industry. Many depend on the specific technologies and processes in use at each industrial facility. There are, however, a number of processes and energy services that are widely used in many industries.

Various industries generate steam and electricity for subsequent use within their facilities. When electricity is generated, the heat that is produced as a by-product can be captured and used for process steam, heating or other industrial purposes. Conventional electricity generation is about 30% efficient, whereas combined heat and power (also called co-generation) converts up to 90 percent of the fuel into usable energy.

Advanced boilers and furnaces can operate at higher temperatures while burning less fuel. These technologies are more efficient and produce fewer pollutants.

Over 45 percent of the fuel used by US manufacturers is burnt to make steam. The typical industrial facility can reduce this energy usage 20 percent (according to the US Department of Energy) by insulating steam and condensate return lines, stopping steam leakage, and maintaining steam traps.

Electric motors usually run at a constant speed, but a variable speed drive allows the motor's energy output to match the required load. This achieves energy savings ranging from 3 to 60 percent, depending on how the motor is used. Motor coils made of superconducting materials can also reduce energy losses. Motors may also benefit from voltage optimization.

Industry uses a large number of pumps and compressors of all shapes and sizes and in a wide variety of applications. The efficiency of pumps and compressors depends on many factors but often improvements can be made by implementing better process control and better maintenance practices. Compressors are commonly used to provide compressed air which is used for sand blasting, painting, and other power tools. According to the US Department of Energy, optimizing compressed air systems by installing variable speed drives, along with preventive maintenance to detect and fix air leaks, can improve energy efficiency 20 to 50 percent.

=== Transportation ===
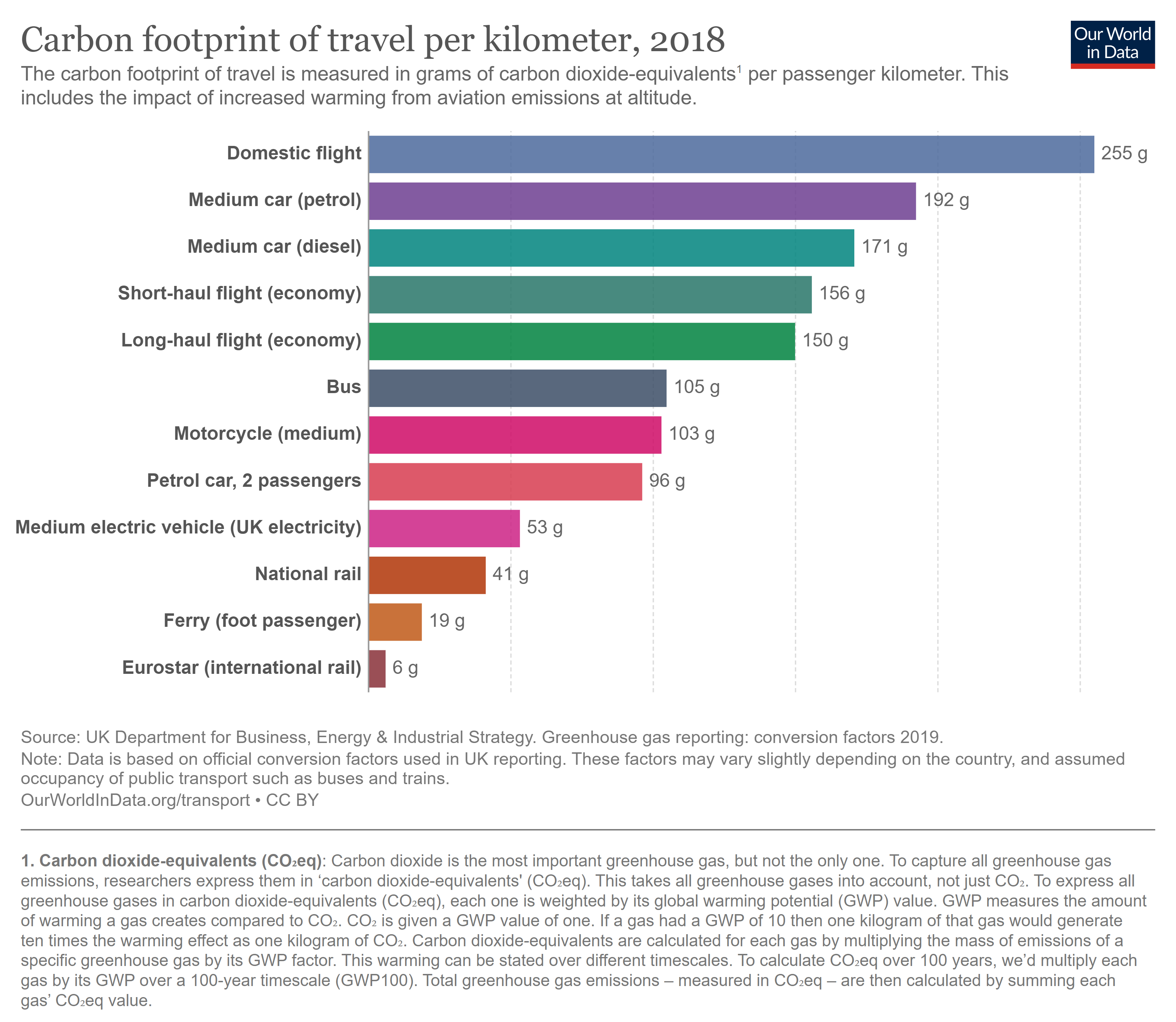
Comparison to show which form of transport has the smallest carbon footprint, an indicator that is related to efficient energy use.

==== Automobiles ====
The estimated energy efficiency for an automobile is 280 Passenger-Mile/10^{6} Btu. There are several ways to enhance a vehicle's energy efficiency. Using improved aerodynamics to minimize drag can increase vehicle fuel efficiency. Reducing vehicle weight can also improve fuel economy, which is why composite materials are widely used in car bodies.

More advanced tires, with decreased tire to road friction and rolling resistance, can save gasoline. Fuel economy can be improved by up to 3.3% by keeping tires inflated to the correct pressure. Replacing a clogged air filter can improve a cars fuel consumption by as much as 10 percent on older vehicles. On newer vehicles (1980s and up) with fuel-injected, computer-controlled engines, a clogged air filter has no effect on mpg but replacing it may improve acceleration by 6-11 percent. Aerodynamics also aid in efficiency of a vehicle. The design of a car impacts the amount of gas needed to move it through air. Aerodynamics involves the air around the car, which can affect the efficiency of the energy expended.

Turbochargers can increase fuel efficiency by allowing a smaller displacement engine. The 'Engine of the year 2011' is the Fiat TwinAir engine equipped with an MHI turbocharger. "Compared with a 1.2-liter 8v engine, the new 85 HP turbo has 23% more power and a 30% better performance index. The performance of the two-cylinder is not only equivalent to a 1.4-liter 16v engine, but fuel consumption is 30% lower."

Energy-efficient vehicles may reach twice the fuel efficiency of the average automobile. Cutting-edge designs, such as the diesel Mercedes-Benz Bionic concept vehicle have achieved a fuel efficiency as high as 84 miles per US gallon (2.8 L/100 km; 101 mpg_{‑imp}), four times the current conventional automotive average.

The mainstream trend in automotive efficiency is the rise of electric vehicles (all-electric or hybrid electric). Electric engines have more than double the efficiency of internal combustion engines. Hybrids, like the Toyota Prius, use regenerative braking to recapture energy that would dissipate in normal cars; the effect is especially pronounced in city driving. Plug-in hybrids also have increased battery capacity, which makes it possible to drive for limited distances without burning any gasoline; in this case, energy efficiency is dictated by whatever process (such as coal-burning, hydroelectric, or renewable source) created the power. Plug-ins can typically drive for around 40 miles (64 km) purely on electricity without recharging; if the battery runs low, a gas engine kicks in allowing for extended range. Finally, all-electric cars are also growing in popularity.

==== Street lighting ====
Cities around the globe light up millions of streets with 300 million lights. Some cities are seeking to reduce street light power consumption by dimming lights during off-peak hours or switching to LED lamps. LED lamps are known to reduce the energy consumption by 50% to 80%.

==== Aircraft ====
There are several ways to improve aviation's use of energy through modifications aircraft and air traffic management. Aircraft improve with better aerodynamics, engines and weight. Seat density and cargo load factors contribute to efficiency.

Air traffic management systems can allow automation of takeoff, landing, and collision avoidance, as well as within airports, from simple things like HVAC and lighting to more complex tasks such as security and scanning.

== International Action ==
=== International agreements and pledges ===
At the 2023 United Nations Climate Change Conference, one of the adopted declaration was the GLOBAL RENEWABLES AND ENERGY EFFICIENCY PLEDGE signed by 123 countries. The declaration includes obligations to consider energy efficiency as "first fuel" and double the rate of increase in energy efficiency from 2% per year to 4% per year by the year 2030. China and India did not sign this pledge.

=== International standards ===
International standards ISO 17743 and ISO 17742 provide a documented methodology for calculating and reporting on energy savings and energy efficiency for countries and cities.

== Examples by country or region ==
=== Europe ===
The first EU-wide energy efficiency target was set in 1998. Member states agreed to improve energy efficiency by 1 percent a year over twelve years. In addition, legislation about products, industry, transport and buildings has contributed to a general energy efficiency framework. More effort is needed to address heating and cooling: there is more heat wasted during electricity production in Europe than is required to heat all buildings in the continent. All in all, EU energy efficiency legislation is estimated to deliver savings worth the equivalent of up to 326 million tons of oil per year by 2020.

The EU set itself a 20% energy savings target by 2020 compared to 1990 levels, but member states decide individually how energy savings will be achieved. At an EU summit in October 2014, EU countries agreed on a new energy efficiency target of 27% or greater by 2030. One mechanism used to achieve the target of 27% is the 'Suppliers Obligations & White Certificates'. The ongoing debate around the 2016 Clean Energy Package also puts an emphasis on energy efficiency, but the goal will probably remain around 30% greater efficiency compared to 1990 levels. Some have argued that this will not be enough for the EU to meet its Paris Agreement goals of reducing greenhouse gas emissions by 40% compared to 1990 levels.

In the European Union, 78% of enterprises proposed energy-saving methods in 2023, 67% listed energy contract renegotiation as a strategy, and 62% stated passing on costs to consumers as a plan to deal with energy market trends. Larger organisations were found more likely to invest in energy efficiency, green innovation, and climate change, with a significant rise in energy efficiency investments reported by SMEs and mid-cap companies.

==== Germany ====
Energy efficiency is central to energy policy in Germany. As of late 2015, national policy includes the following efficiency and consumption targets (with actual values for 2014):

Efficiency and consumption target	2014	2020	2050
Primary energy consumption (base year 2008)	−8.7%	−20%	−50%
Final energy productivity (2008–2050)	1.6%/year (2008–2014)	2.1%/year (2008–2050)	
Gross electricity consumption (base year 2008)	−4.6%	−10%	−25%
Primary energy consumption in buildings (base year 2008)	−14.8%		−80%
Heat consumption in buildings (base year 2008)	−12.4%	−20%	
Final energy consumption in transport (base year 2005)	1.7%	−10%	−40%

Progress toward improved efficiency has been steady. Some however believe energy efficiency is still under-recognized in terms of its contribution to Germany's energy transformation (or Energiewende).

Efforts to reduce final energy consumption in transport sector have not been successful, with a growth of 1.7% between 2005 and 2014. This growth is due to both road passenger and road freight transport. Both sectors increased their overall distance travelled to record the highest figures ever for Germany. Rebound effects played a significant role, both between improved vehicle efficiency and the distance travelled, and between improved vehicle efficiency and an increase in vehicle weights and engine power.

In 2014, the German federal government released its National Action Plan on Energy Efficiency (NAPE). The areas covered are the energy efficiency of buildings, energy conservation for companies, consumer energy efficiency, and transport energy efficiency. The central short-term measures of NAPE include the introduction of competitive tendering for energy efficiency, the raising of funding for building renovation, the introduction of tax incentives for efficiency measures in the building sector, and the setting up energy efficiency networks together with business and industry.

In 2016, the German government released a green paper on energy efficiency for public consultation (in German). It outlines the potential challenges and actions needed to reduce energy consumption in Germany over the coming decades. At the document's launch, economics and energy minister Sigmar Gabriel said "we do not need to produce, store, transmit and pay for the energy that we save". The green paper prioritizes the efficient use of energy as the "first" response and also outlines opportunities for sector coupling, including using renewable power for heating and transport. Other proposals include a flexible energy tax which rises as petrol prices fall, thereby incentivizing fuel conservation despite low oil prices.

==== Spain ====
In Spain, four out of every five buildings use more energy than they should. They are either inadequately insulated or consume energy inefficiently.

The Unión de Créditos Immobiliarios (UCI), which has operations in Spain and Portugal, is increasing loans to homeowners and building management groups for energy-efficiency initiatives. Their Residential Energy Rehabilitation initiative aims to remodel and encourage the use of renewable energy in at least 3720 homes in Madrid, Barcelona, Valencia, and Seville. The works are expected to mobilize around €46.5 million in energy efficiency upgrades by 2025 and save approximately 8.1 GWh of energy. It has the ability to reduce carbon emissions by 7,545 tonnes per year.

==== Poland ====
In May 2016 Poland adopted a new Act on Energy Efficiency, to enter into force on 1 October 2016.

=== Australia ===
In July 2009, the Council of Australian Governments, which represents the individual states and territories of Australia, agreed to a National Strategy on Energy Efficiency (NSEE). This is a ten-year plan accelerating the implementation of a nationwide adoption of energy-efficient practices and a preparation for the country's transformation into a low carbon future. The overriding agreement that governs this strategy is the National Partnership Agreement on Energy Efficiency.

=== Canada ===
In August 2017, the Government of Canada released Build Smart - Canada's Buildings Strategy, as a key driver of the Pan-Canadian Framework on Clean Growth and Climate Change, Canada's national climate strategy.

=== United States ===
A 2011 Energy Modeling Forum study covering the United States examined how energy efficiency opportunities will shape future fuel and electricity demand over the next several decades. The US economy is already set to lower its energy and carbon intensity, but explicit policies will be necessary to meet climate goals. These policies include: a carbon tax, mandated standards for more efficient appliances, buildings and vehicles, and subsidies or reductions in the upfront costs of new more energy-efficient equipment.

Programs and organizations:

- Alliance to Save Energy
- American Council for an Energy-Efficient Economy
- Building Codes Assistance Project
- Building Energy Codes Program
- Consortium for Energy Efficiency
- Energy Star, from United States Environmental Protection Agency

== See also ==
- Carbon footprint – Concept for greenhouse gas emissions analysis
- Energy audit – Inspection, survey and analysis of energy flows in a building
- Energy conservation measure – Reducing energy consumption
- Energy conversion efficiency – Ratio between the useful output and the input of a machine
- Energy efficiency implementation
- Energy law – Law governing the use and taxation of energy
- Energy recovery – Extracting energy from exhaust or waste
- Energy recycling – Process of using energy that would normally be wasted
- Energy resilience – National security considerations of energy availability
- List of least carbon efficient power stations
- Waste-to-energy – Process of generating energy from the primary treatment of waste
