= The Solar Generation =

2018 book by Philip R Wolfe

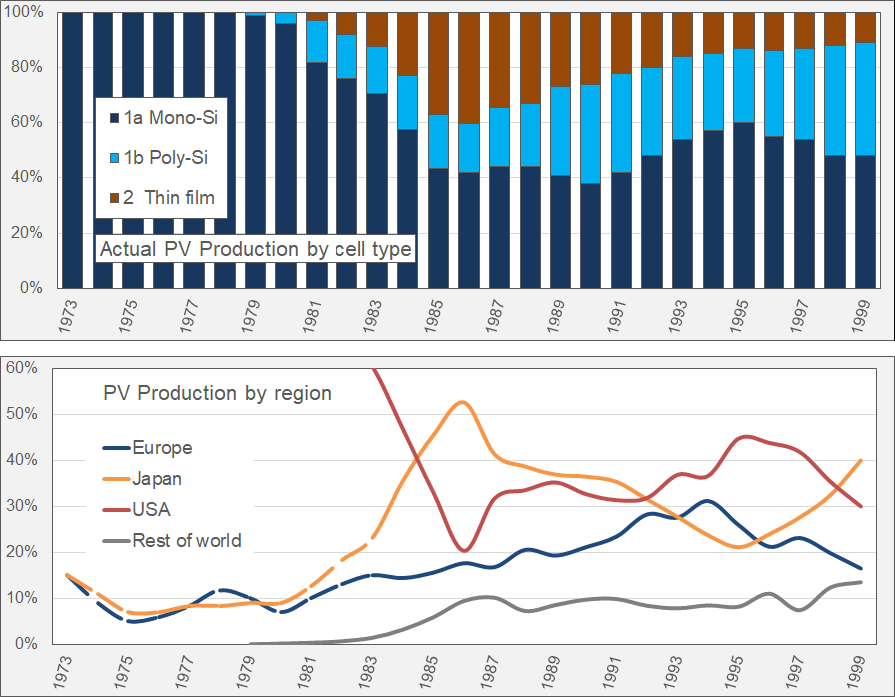
- Technology and regional trends (Figs 5.3 and 5.4 from the book)
- Author: Philip R Wolfe
- Language: English
- Subject: Solar energy Renewable Energy
- Publisher: John Wiley & Sons; copyright IEEE
- Publication date: 2018
- Publication place: USA (author UK)
- Media type: paperback and electronic versions
- Pages: 411
- ISBN: 978-1-119-42558-8

The Solar Generation: Childhood and Adolescence of Terrestrial Photovoltaics is a 2018 book by Philip R Wolfe published by John Wiley & Sons and the IEEE. It describes the early years of the solar power sector, covering in particular the years between 1973 and 1999.

The author's foreword says this was a period when solar power was "discounted as an irrelevance", but he "confidently predicts that it will be the world's largest energy source" within his lifetime.

The book covers specifically solar photovoltaic power generation for terrestrial uses. It does not deal with space applications of solar cells, nor solar thermal energy including CSP.

== Book Volumes and Chapters ==
The book is presented in three parts:

=== Part I: A biography of terrestrial photovoltaics ===
This part tells the story of the period from various perspectives; research and technology, industrial development, applications of solar generation, economics and the geo-political context.

It has chapters entitled:

1. Origins of terrestrial solar power;
2. What is photovoltaics?;
3. Terrestrial solar applications;
4. Photovoltaic research;
5. PV business and markets;
6. Economics of solar generation;
7. Solar industry participants;
8. Geo-politics of the early solar sector; and
9. The next generation

=== Part II: Encyclopaedia; People, organisations, events ===
Central to this section is a 'Who's Who' of the leading participants in the early solar sector:

- Profiles of sixty-six leading pioneers of the time. In total over 200 people are mentioned.
- Profiles of forty-two companies active in the early PV sector; together with thirteen leading research institutions; and ten national and international agencies. Nearly 100 others are also mentioned.

Part II also includes compendia enumerating specific records and achievements in research and technology; national and international policies towards the sector; prizes, awards, conferences and expositions.

=== Part III: Dictionary; References, glossary and indexes ===
This very comprehensive reference section includes Acknowledgements; Citations; Bibliography; Glossary and Indexes

== See also ==
- Solar photovoltaics
- Solar Power
- Renewable energy commercialization
- List of books about renewable energy
