= Nina Skorupska =

British engineer (born 1961)

Nina Maria Skorupska CBE FREng (born 1961) is a British engineer, and former chief executive of the Renewable Energy Association, a member of the board of Transport for London, and former deputy chair of the WISE Campaign.

== Personal life and education ==
Skorupska is the daughter of a Polish immigrant. Influenced by Star Trek she chose to study astronomy and astrophysics at university, "But I realised my mathematics wasn't as hot as it needed to be". She has a BSc (1983) and a PhD (1987), both in Chemistry, from Newcastle University; her PhD thesis title was Coal Combustibility. She married Martin Tedd in 1991 and they "have fulfilled a life-long dream to renovate a beautiful building on the coast and make it our eco home". They formed the company Elysian Ark together in June 2013 with the aim to "create opportunities for business and for society in the areas of energy, health and sustainability". Skorupska is vegetarian.

== Career ==
Skorupska entered the energy industry, becoming RWE's first female manager of a UK power station, at Didcot B. Within the RWE group she moved on to work in Germany as Director of Performance Improvement and in the Netherlands as Chief Technology Officer at Essent until December 2012. In July 2013, she became the chief executive of the Renewable Energy Association (REA, in full the Association for Renewable Energy and Clean Technology). She was a visiting professor at London Metropolitan University 2013–2016, and a non-executive director and deputy chair of the WISE Campaign (Women Into Science and Engineering), 2014–2020.

In 2016, Skorupska joined the board of Transport for London and in 2021 she joined the Supervisory Board of Royal BAM Group. In 2020 she became one of the inaugural members of the UK government's Jet Zero Council, "a partnership between industry and government ... with the aim of delivering zero-emission transatlantic flight within a generation".

== Recognition ==
In 2016, Skorpuska was recognised by the Women's Engineering Society as one of the "Top 50 women in engineering".

Skorupska was appointed CBE in the 2016 New Year Honours "For services to Renewables and Equality in the Energy Industry.", and is described in the citation as "Chief Executive, Renewable Energy Association and Non-Executive Director, WISE Campaign."

In 2026 she was elected a Fellow of the Royal Academy of Engineering.
