= Alliance to Save Energy =

Environmental organization

- Formation: March 18, 1977; 49 years ago
- Headquarters: Washington, DC, USA
- Honorary Chair: Jeanne Shaheen (D-NH)
- Chair: Christopher Womack, President, Chairman, & CEO Georgia Power
- President: Paula R. Glover
- Key people: Charles H. Percy (founding chair), Hubert Humphrey (co-founder)
- Website: www.ase.org

The Alliance to Save Energy is a bipartisan, nonprofit coalition of business, government, environmental, and consumer groups based in Washington, D.C. The Alliance states that it advocates for "energy-efficiency policies that minimize costs to society and individual consumers, and that lessen greenhouse gas emissions and their impact on the global climate." The Alliance's chief activities include public relations, research, and lobbying to change U.S. energy policy.

The Alliance was established on March 18, 1977, with the support of then U.S. President Jimmy Carter. It was the initiative of Senators Charles Percy (R-Ill.) and Hubert Humphrey (D-Minn.).

== Member organizations ==
The Alliance includes more than 100 organizations committed to energy efficiency as a primary way to achieve the nation's environmental, economic, energy security, and affordable housing goals. Members include a wide variety of companies, nonprofits, industry groups, and government organizations.

== Federal policy ==
The Alliance's primary activity is developing, vetting, and advocating for federal, bipartisan energy efficiency policies. Areas of policy work include tax incentives for energy efficiency, appropriations for federal energy efficiency programs at the Department of Energy's Office of Energy Efficiency & Renewable Energy and the Environmental Protection Agency, clean transportation solutions, federal energy management, funding for research and development, and more.

Over its four decades of work, the Alliance has had a hand in shaping of number of significant pieces of energy legislation. In recent years, these have included the Energy Act of 2020, the American Recovery and Reinvestment Act of 2009, the Energy and Tax Extenders Act of 2008, the Energy Independence and Security Act of 2007, the Energy Policy Act of 2005, the Energy Policy Act of 1992, and the National Appliance Energy Conservation Act of 1987. The Alliance also applauded the enactment of the Paris Climate Agreement in 2015.

=== 117th Congress ===
The Alliance states that it supports a suite of energy efficiency policies designed to both reduce carbon emissions and fuel economic recovery in the wake of the COVID-19 pandemic. In August 2021, the Alliance supported the introduction of the Main Street Efficiency Act of 2021 in the House by Rep. Peter Welch (D-Vt.) and in the Senate by Sen. Catherine Cortez Masto (D-Nev.). The bill would, "require the Secretary of Energy to establish a grant program to incentivize small business participation in demand side management programs."

The Alliance additionally supported the introduction of the Open Back Better Act of 2021 by Rep. Lisa Blunt Rochester (D-Del.) and Sen. Tina Smith (D-Minn.), which would "provide grants to federal and state agencies and tribal organizations to implement building projects that increase resiliency, energy efficiency, renewable energy, and grid integration."

Additional legislation supported by the Alliance in the 117th Congress includes the HOPE for HOMES Act, NO EXHAUST Act, and the Blue Collar to Green Collar Jobs Development Act.

== Alliance to Save Energy initiatives ==
=== 50x50 ===
The Alliance convened the 50x50 Commission on U.S. Transportation Sector Efficiency from 2017 to 2019 with the stated goal to reduce energy use in the transportation sector 50% by 2050. The Commission released two reports, "50x50: Reinventing U.S. Mobility," and "Building the Foundation for 50x50: A Policy Proposal for Infrastructure and Surface Transportation Authorization." Following release of the latter, the 50x50 Transportation Action Network was formed to implement the recommendations from the reports. The recommendations include a number of federal policy actions intended to encourage electric vehicle adoption, invest in sustainable infrastructure, improve port and airport efficiency, strengthen public transit and rail systems, and accelerate research and development.

=== Active Efficiency ===
In September 2019, the Alliance launched the Active Efficiency Collaborative, a group of industry leaders, NGOs, and public sector institutions that works to accelerate the adoption of Active Efficiency. Active Efficiency optimizes the use of energy by integrating the benefits of traditional energy efficiency measures with the opportunities presented by digital technologies. The Collaborative aims to take advantage of new advances in the energy sector, including digitalization, distributed energy resources, beneficial electrification, and smart devices to achieve deeper decarbonization and reduced energy burdens. According to the initiative's website, its activities include "deepening collaboration among stakeholders, cultivating champions, and developing strategies and policies to scale up Active Efficiency." In 2021, the Collaborative was chaired by Sarah Orban Salati of the New York Power Authority and Bert Van Hoof of Microsoft.

=== CarbonCount ===
CarbonCount is a metric developed by the Alliance to Save Energy that quantifies the impact of investments in U.S.-based energy-efficiency and renewable-energy projects given the expected reduction in carbon dioxide (CO_{2}) emissions resulting from each $1,000 of investment. In 2015, Bloomberg New Energy Finance honored CarbonCount with its Finance for Resilience (FiRE) award. FiRE is an open and action-oriented platform that collects, develops and helps implement powerful ideas to accelerate finance for clean energy, climate, sustainability and green growth. FiRe singles out ideas that have the potential for incremental finance of at least $1bn in clean energy in the first three years of implementation, that are achievable within 1–3 years. Hannon Armstrong's 2015 issuance of Sustainable Yield Bonds secured by a portion of its utility scale solar and wind real estate related assets was the first investment to be certified under the CarbonCount methodology, receiving a CarbonCount score of 0.39 metric tons of CO_{2} offset per $1000 of investment. In 2016, Deutsche Bank received a CarbonCount score of 0.18 metric tons of CO_{2} offset per $1000 of investment in a portfolio of rooftop solar PV systems.

=== EmPowered Schools ===
Since 1996, the Alliance has led energy efficiency education programs in schools. In 2021, the EmPowered Schools program was active in more than 200 schools across the country, teaching students the fundamentals of energy efficiency and about opportunities in green careers. According to the Alliance, schools that participate in the EmPowered program generally see 5-15% energy savings on their energy bills.

=== Energy Efficiency Forums and Summits ===
The Alliance hosts an annual forum for leaders in energy efficiency. The Energy Efficiency Global Forum website states that the event, "brings together the brightest minds in energy efficiency to discuss pressing issues, identify emerging trends, and connect with peers from dozens of countries around the globe." The forum is typically hosted in Washington, D.C., but in 2018 it was held in Copenhagen, and in 2020 and 2021 it took place virtually due to the COVID-19 pandemic. The Alliance recently hosted Policy Summits in 2020 and 2022 with a focus on federal energy policies and priorities.

=== Stars of Energy Efficiency Awards ===
Since 1993, the Alliance has awarded progress in energy efficiency with its annual Star of Energy Efficiency Awards. Typically awarded at an annual dinner gala in Washington, D.C., winners have included individuals, government organizations, corporations, nonprofits, and utilities who demonstrated a commitment to advancing energy efficiency.

== Board of directors ==
The Alliance to Save Energy board includes CEOs, presidents, and senior executives of companies, associations, consumer, and environmental organizations, as well as officials from state government, universities, and law firms.

The first board of directors and board of advisors were chaired by Senator Percy and Henry A. Kissinger, respectively. Honorary chairmen included Senators Daniel J. Evans, H. John Heinz III and Timothy E. Wirth.

The current board Honorary Board of Advisors is chaired by Sen. Jeanne Shaheen (D-N.H.). Sen. Rob Portman (R-Ohio) and Sen. Chris Coons (D-Del.) serve as honorary vice-chairs. Honorary Board members include Rep. Michael Burgess, M.D. (R-Texas), Sen. Susan M. Collins (R-Maine), Rep. Mike Kelly (R-Pa.), Rep. Adam Kinzinger (R-Ill.), Sen. Edward Markey (D-Mass.), Rep. David McKinley (R-W. Va.), Sen. Lisa Murkowski (R-Alaska), Rep. Bobby Rush (D-Ill.), Rep. Paul Tonko (D-N.Y.), Sen. Mark Warner (D-Va.), Rep. Peter Welch (D-Vt.), Sen. Ron Wyden (D-Ore.), and Kandeh Yumkella.

The Board of Directors is chaired by Georgia Power President, Chairman, and CEO Christopher Womack. Other officers include Puget Sound Energy President and CEO Mary Kipp, Johnson Controls Vice President of Global Consumer Relations Katie McGinty, EnerGreen Capital Management LLC Founder and Managing Partner Carolyn Green, and Alliance President Paula Glover.

The Chair Emeritus is Gil Quiniones, CEO of ComEd.

== See also ==
- Energy conservation
- Energy conversion efficiency
- Sustainable energy
- Energy poverty
