= Building Energy Codes Program =

The U.S. Department of Energy’s (DOE's) Building Energy Codes Program (BECP) was established in 1991 (originally called the Building Standards and Guidelines Program), with its activities defined by the Energy Conservation and Production Act (ECPA) (Pub. L. No 94-385), as amended, and the Energy Independence and Security Act (EISA) (Pub. L. No 110-140). These statutes direct DOE to participate in industry processes to develop model building energy codes, issue determinations as to whether updated codes result in energy savings, and provide technical assistance to states to implement and comply with the codes. The BECP is part of DOE's Energy Efficiency and Renewable Energy Building Technologies Office.

== Program Areas ==
BECP focuses on three key building energy code areas: model code development, adoption, and compliance.

=== Model Code Development ===
DOE is directed by statute to review the technical and economic basis of building energy codes and participate in processes for their review and modification, including adoption of all technologically feasible and economically justified energy efficiency measures.

=== Adoption ===
DOE is directed by statute to provide technical assistance to states implementing building energy codes, including the adoption of all technologically feasible and economically justified efficiency measures, as well as encouraging states to adopt updated building energy codes.

=== Compliance ===
DOE is directed by statute to provide technical assistance to states implementing energy codes.

== See also ==
- American Society of Heating, Refrigerating and Air-Conditioning Engineers
- Building Codes Assistance Project
- Energy Conservation and Production Act
- International Code Council
- International Energy Conservation Code
- United States Energy Building Codes
- United States Department of Energy
