= Association for Renewable Energy and Clean Technology =

UK non-governmental energy trade association

The Association For Renewable Energy and Clean Technology
- Abbreviation: REA
- Formation: 26 June 2001
- Type: Trade association
- Legal status: Non-profit company (No. 04241430)
- Purpose: Renewable energy industry in the UK
- Headquarters: London
- Region served: UK
- Members: c. 500 companies
- Chief Executive: Nina Skorupska
- Main organ: REA Board
- Staff: 20-30

The Association for Renewable Energy and Clean Technology, previously known as Renewable Energy Association (REA), is a renewable energy and clean technology trade association in the UK encompassing all of renewables industry in the United Kingdom. REA covers renewable power & flexibility, heat and cooling, circular bioresources and transport. The REA is a not-for-profit company.

== History ==
The Renewable Power Association was established in 2001 as a not-for-profit trade association, representing British renewable energy producers and promoting the use of renewable energy in the UK. The company changed its name in November 2005 to Renewable Energy Association. Renewable Energy Association was merged with the Association for Organics Recycling (AfOR) in September 2012, the latter becoming the "Organics Recycling Group" under REA. The Company name was officially changed again to The Association for Renewable Energy and Clean Technology in October 2019.

== Activities ==
=== Lobbying and Regulation ===
All-Party Parliamentary Group (APPG) on Energy Storage, for which the REA was the secretariat between its founding in July 2015 and its last registration in November 2019.

All-Party Parliamentary Group (APPG) on Electric Vehicles, for which the REA is the secretariat since November 2017.

The campaign for net-zero aviation in the UK, led by the Jet Zero Council, which is a partnership between industry and the UK Government with the aim of delivering zero-emission transatlantic flight within a generation. Dr Nina Skorupska CBE is a member of this council in her capacity as the CEO of the REA.

REA has reported significant reduction in greenhouse gases can be obtained by use of biofuels rather than fossil fuels.

=== Government Criticism ===
REA has been critical of the UK Governments' lack of funding for the production of electricity from organic waste, a failure to define policies to meet the European-wide energy targets, reductions to the Feed-in tariff and the lack of a robust framework for renewables.

REA supported the environmental audit committee in calling for the government to cut VAT on repairs fort electrical goods and green home improvements.

On 21 September 2021 REA published its report Energy Transition Readiness Index 2021 and warned that urgent action was needed make the UK Electricity grid more flexible to cate for more variable types of energy coming online, one of the points raised that as electricity storage facilities were treated as generators and charge both for transmission of electricity to and from the storage over the grid which was a disincentive for investment in the technology.

=== Safety ===
The REA provides guidance on health and safety at operational sites.

During the COVID-19 pandemic, the REA aimed to support its members and others by making the UK Government aware of the impact of the pandemic and lockdown restrictions on industry, networking between members to dispose of additional food and drinks waste caused by the closure of restaurants, and providing details to members of financial support available.

=== Standards ===
The British Standard's Institute (BSI) Publicly Available Specifications (PAS) 100 & 110, concerning compost quality and anaerobic digestate quality.

REA, through its subsidiary, launched the UK's first Electric Vehicle Consumer Code (EVCC) in 2020, a voluntary scheme for domestic charge point installers.

=== Conventions ===
Green Gas Day, which is the UK's largest green gas industry gathering, organised in collaboration with CNG Services Ltd, and hosted since 2012 at the National Motorcycle Museum in Birmingham, UK.

=== Biofuels ===
Biofuels are one area within REA's scope and some elements have proved controversial. In 2014 REA was criticised for encouraging reliance on large non renewable energy company members including the operators of Drax power station and Eggborough power station and lobbying to expand the use of food crops as biofuels including palm oil and soya.
