= List of acts of the Parliament of the United Kingdom from 1976 =

This is a list of acts of the Parliament of the United Kingdom passed in 1976.

Acts passed since 1963 are cited by calendar year, as opposed to the convention used for earlier acts of citing the regnal year(s) in which the relevant parliamentary session was held. Each act passed in a respective year is given a chapter number (abbreviated "c."), denoted by Arabic numerals in the case of public general acts, lowercase Roman numerals in the case of local acts, or italicised Arabic numerals in the case of personal acts. These run as separate series.

124 acts of Parliament were passed in 1976: 86 public general acts and 38 local acts.

indicates that an act has been transcribed on Wikisource, indicates that an act is available to view at legislation.gov.uk, and indicates the location of the original act in the Parliamentary Archives.

== Public general acts ==
Short title	Citation	Royal assent
Long title
National Coal Board (Finance) Act 1976	1976 c. 1	4 March 1976
An Act to increase the limit on the borrowing powers of the National Coal Board; to provide for reimbursing to the Board out of public money certain expenditure of theirs in respect of the mineworkers' pension scheme; and to extend the purposes for which grants may be made, under section 7 of the Coal Industry Act 1973, (Note: Coal Industry Act 1973 (c. 8)) towards the cost of stock-piling coal and coke.
Consolidated Fund Act 1976	1976 c. 2	25 March 1976
An Act to apply certain sums out of the Consolidated Fund to the service of the years ending on 31st March 1975 and 1976.
Road Traffic (Drivers' Ages and Hours of Work) Act 1976	1976 c. 3	25 March 1976
An Act to amend the Road Traffic Act 1972 (Note: Road Traffic Act 1972 (c. 20)) in so far as it relates to drivers' licences and the minimum age for driving certain classes of vehicles and to amend Part VI of the Transport Act 1968 (Note: Transport Act 1968 (c. 73)) and for connected purposes.
Trustee Savings Banks Act 1976 (repealed)	1976 c. 4	25 March 1976
An Act to establish a Trustee Savings Banks Central Board; to confer wider powers on trustee savings banks; to transfer to the Registrar of Friendly Societies certain functions previously exercised by other persons; and for purposes connected therewith. (Repealed by Trustee Savings Banks Act 1981 (c. 65))
Education (School-leaving Dates) Act 1976 (repealed)	1976 c. 5	25 March 1976
An Act to make further provision with respect to school-leaving dates; and for connected purposes. (Repealed by Education Act 1996 (c. 56))
Solicitors (Scotland) Act 1976 (repealed)	1976 c. 6	25 March 1976
An Act to make provision as to the powers of the Law Society of Scotland to intervene in the professional practice and conduct of solicitors; to make provision for the appointment of a lay observer to examine the Society's treatment of complaints about solicitors and the appointment of lay members of the Scottish Solicitors Discipline Tribunal; to extend the powers of that Tribunal; to make provision as to the indemnity of solicitors against professional liability; to amend the Solicitors (Scotland) Acts 1933 to 1965; and for connected purposes. (Repealed by Statute Law (Repeals) Act 1989 (c. 43))
Trade Union and Labour Relations (Amendment) Act 1976 (repealed)	1976 c. 7	25 March 1976
An Act to repeal (in whole or in part), replace or amend sections 5, 6, 7, 8, 13, 29 and 30 of the Trade Union and Labour Relations Act 1974 (Note: Trade Union and Labour Relations Act 1974 (c. 52)) and paragraph 6 of Schedule 1 to that Act and to provide for a charter on matters relating to the freedom of the press. (Repealed by Trade Union and Labour Relations (Consolidation) Act 1992 (c. 52))
Prevention of Terrorism (Temporary Provisions) Act 1976	1976 c. 8	25 March 1976
An Act to repeal and re-enact with amendments the provisions of the Prevention of Terrorism (Temporary Provisions) Act 1974.
Water Charges Act 1976 (repealed)	1976 c. 9	25 March 1976
An Act to make provision for the refund of certain charges made by water authorities in England and Wales in respect of the financial years 1974–75 and 1975–76 and as to the scope of the powers of such authorities to make charges. (Repealed by Water Act 1989 (c. 15))
Post Office (Banking Services) Act 1976 (repealed)	1976 c. 10	25 March 1976
An Act to extend the powers of the Post Office to provide banking services; to make capital available for the provision of those services; to reduce the capital debt of the Post Office; and for connected purposes. (Repealed by Postal Services Act 2000 (c. 26))
Housing (Amendment) (Scotland) Act 1976	1976 c. 11	13 April 1976
An Act to amend section 25(1) of the Housing (Financial Provisions) (Scotland) Act 1968. (Note: Housing (Financial Provisions) (Scotland) Act 1968 (c. 31))
Statute Law Revision (Northern Ireland) Act 1976 (repealed)	1976 c. 12	13 April 1976
An Act to revise the statute law of Northern Ireland by repealing obsolete, spent, unnecessary or superseded enactments. (Repealed by Statute Law (Repeals) Act 1998 (c. 43))
Damages (Scotland) Act 1976 (repealed)	1976 c. 13	13 April 1976
An Act to amend the law of Scotland relating to the damages recoverable in respect of deaths caused by personal injuries; to define the rights to damages in respect of personal injuries and death which are transmitted to an executor; to abolish rights to assythment; to make provision relating to the damages due to a pursuer for patrimonial loss caused by personal injuries whereby his expectation of life is diminished; and for purposes connected with the matters aforesaid. (Repealed by Damages (Scotland) Act 2011 (asp 7))
Fatal Accidents and Sudden Deaths Inquiry (Scotland) Act 1976 (repealed)	1976 c. 14	13 April 1976
An Act to make provision for Scotland for the holding of public inquiries in respect of fatal accidents, deaths of persons in legal custody, sudden, suspicious and unexplained deaths and deaths occurring in circumstances giving rise to serious public concern. (Repealed by Inquiries into Fatal Accidents and Sudden Deaths etc. (Scotland) Act 2016 (asp 2))
Rating (Caravan Sites) Act 1976	1976 c. 15	13 April 1976
An Act to allow for the valuation and rating as a single unit in certain cases of caravan sites or portions of caravan sites inclusive of parts separately occupied by caravanners and of their caravans; and for purposes connected therewith.
Statute Law (Repeals) Act 1976	1976 c. 16	27 May 1976
An Act to promote the reform of the statute law by the repeal, in accordance with recommendations of the Law Commission and the Scottish Law Commission, of certain enactments which (except in so far as their effect is preserved) are no longer of practical utility, and to make other provision in connection with the repeal of those enactments.
Land Drainage (Amendment) Act 1976	1976 c. 17	27 May 1976
An Act to amend the Land Drainage Act 1930, (Note: Land Drainage Act 1930 (20 & 21 Geo. 5. c. 44)) the Land Drainage Act 1961, (Note: Land Drainage Act 1961 (9 & 10 Eliz. 2. c. 48)) Part IV of the Agriculture (Miscellaneous Provisions) Act 1968 (Note: Agriculture (Miscellaneous Provisions) Act 1968 (c. 34)) and related enactments.
Licensing (Amendment) Act 1976 (repealed)	1976 c. 18	27 May 1976
An Act to amend the law relating to premises for which special hours certificates may be granted under the Licensing Act 1964. (Note: Licensing Act 1964 (c. 26)) (Repealed by Licensing Act 2003 (c. 17))
Seychelles Act 1976	1976 c. 19	27 May 1976
An Act to make provision for, and in connection with, the attainment by Seychelles of fully responsible status as a Republic within the Commonwealth.
Education (Scotland) Act 1976 (repealed)	1976 c. 20	10 June 1976
An Act to make further provision with respect to school commencement and leaving dates and the supply of milk in schools; to provide for the remuneration of members of Independent Schools Tribunals; to make provision with respect to the construction of educational endowment schemes; to make minor amendments to the Education (Scotland) Act 1962 (Note: Education (Scotland) Act 1962 (10 & 11 Eliz. 2. c. 47)) and the Education (Scotland) Act 1969; (Note: Education (Scotland) Act 1969 (c. 49)) and for connected purposes. (Repealed by Education (Scotland) Act 1980 (c. 44))
Crofting Reform (Scotland) Act 1976	1976 c. 21	10 June 1976
An Act to confer new rights on crofters and cottars to acquire subjects tenanted or occupied by them; to confer rights on crofters to share in the value of land resumed by landlords or taken possession of compulsorily; to protect the interests of crofters and cottars from planning blight; to make further provision as to financial assistance for crofters, cottars and certain owner-occupiers of certain land; to make further provision as to the removal of land from crofting tenure; to amend the law with respect to common grazings; to extend the powers of the Scottish Land Court; to make provision for pensions and compensation for members of the Crofters Commission; and for connected purposes.
Freshwater and Salmon Fisheries (Scotland) Act 1976 (repealed)	1976 c. 22	10 June 1976
An Act to make new provision with respect to freshwater and salmon fisheries in Scotland; and for connected purposes. (Repealed by Salmon and Freshwater Fisheries (Consolidation) (Scotland) Act 2003 (asp 15))
Atomic Energy Authority (Special Constables) Act 1976	1976 c. 23	10 June 1976
An Act to extend the powers relating to firearms of special constables appointed on the nomination of the United Kingdom Atomic Energy Authority; to extend the property in respect of which, and the places where, they may exercise those and their other powers; to make certain minor amendments about their powers; and for connected purposes.
Development Land Tax Act 1976	1976 c. 24	22 July 1976
An Act to impose a new tax on the realisation of the development value of land; to provide for the termination of the charges on capital gains from land imposed by Chapters I and II of Part III of the Finance Act 1974; (Note: Finance Act 1974 (c. 30)) and for connected purposes.
Fair Employment (Northern Ireland) Act 1976 (repealed)	1976 c. 25	22 July 1976
An Act to establish an Agency with the duties of promoting equality of opportunity in employments and occupations in Northern Ireland between people of different religious beliefs and of working for the elimination of discrimination which is unlawful by virtue of the Act; to render unlawful, in connection with such employments and occupations, certain kinds of discrimination on the ground of religious belief or political opinion; and for connected purposes. (Repealed by Fair Employment and Treatment (Northern Ireland) Order 1998 (SI 1998/3162))
Explosives (Age of Purchase &c.) Act 1976	1976 c. 26	22 July 1976
An Act to restrict further the sale to young persons of explosive substances, including fireworks, and to increase the penalties provided by sections 31 and 80 of the Explosives Act 1875. (Note: Explosives Act 1875 (38 & 39 Vict. c. 17))
Theatres Trust Act 1976	1976 c. 27	22 July 1976
An Act to establish a Theatres Trust for the better protection of theatres; and for purposes connected therewith.
Congenital Disabilities (Civil Liability) Act 1976	1976 c. 28	22 July 1976
An Act to make provision as to civil liability in the case of children born disabled in consequence of some person's fault; and to extend the Nuclear Installations Act 1965, (Note: Nuclear Installations Act 1965 (c. 57)) so that children so born in consequence of a breach of duty under that Act may claim compensation.
Representation of the People (Armed Forces) Act 1976 (repealed)	1976 c. 29	22 July 1976
An Act to make provision for the registration for electoral purposes of members of the armed forces and the wives and husbands of such members. (Repealed by Representation of the People Act 1983 (c. 2))
Fatal Accidents Act 1976	1976 c. 30	22 July 1976
An Act to consolidate the Fatal Accidents Acts.
Legitimacy Act 1976	1976 c. 31	22 July 1976
An Act to consolidate certain enactments relating to legitimacy.
Lotteries and Amusements Act 1976 (repealed)	1976 c. 32	22 July 1976
An Act to consolidate certain enactments relating to lotteries, prize competitions and amusements with prizes. (Repealed by Gambling Act 2005 (c. 19))
Restrictive Practices Court Act 1976 (repealed)	1976 c. 33	22 July 1976
An Act to consolidate certain enactments relating to the Restrictive Practices Court. (Repealed by Competition Act 1998 (c. 41))
Restrictive Trade Practices Act 1976 (repealed)	1976 c. 34	22 July 1976
An Act to consolidate the enactments relating to restrictive trade practices. (Repealed by Competition Act 1998 (c. 41))
Police Pensions Act 1976	1976 c. 35	22 July 1976
An Act to consolidate the Police Pensions Act 1948 (Note: Police Pensions Act 1948 (11 & 12 Geo. 6. c. 24)) and certain other enactments relating to the pensions to be paid to and in respect of members of police forces.
Adoption Act 1976	1976 c. 36	22 July 1976
An Act to consolidate the enactments having effect in England and Wales in relation to adoption.
Food and Drugs (Control of Food Premises) Act 1976 (repealed)	1976 c. 37	22 July 1976
An Act to amend the Food and Drugs Act 1955 (Note: Food and Drugs Act 1955 (4 & 5 Eliz. 2. c. 16)) by prohibiting the sale, etc., of food in certain circumstances. (Repealed by Food Act 1984 (c. 30))
Dangerous Wild Animals Act 1976	1976 c. 38	22 July 1976
An Act to regulate the keeping of certain kinds of dangerous wild animals.
Divorce (Scotland) Act 1976	1976 c. 39	22 July 1976
An Act to amend the law of Scotland relating to divorce and separation; to facilitate reconciliation of the parties in consistorial causes; to amend the law as to the power of the court to make orders relating to financial provision arising out of divorce and to settlements and other dealings by a party to the marriage, and as to the power of the court to award aliment to spouses in actions for aliment; to abolish the oath of calumny; and for purposes connected with the matters aforesaid.
Finance Act 1976	1976 c. 40	29 July 1976
An Act to grant certain duties, to alter other duties, and to amend the law relating to the National Debt and the Public Revenue, and to make further provision in connection with Finance.
Iron and Steel (Amendment) Act 1976 (repealed)	1976 c. 41	29 July 1976
An Act to make provision with respect to the limit on the sums borrowed by, or paid by the Secretary of State to, the British Steel Corporation and the publicly-owned companies, with respect to the powers of the Corporation to lend and borrow and the powers of those companies to borrow and with respect to the Corporation's accounts; and for connected purposes. (Repealed by Iron and Steel Act 1982 (c. 25))
Protection of Birds (Amendment) Act 1976	1976 c. 42	29 July 1976
An Act to amend further the Protection of Birds Act 1954. (Note: Protection of Birds Act 1954 (2 & 3 Eliz. 2. c. 30))
Appropriation Act 1976	1976 c. 43	6 August 1976
An Act to apply a sum out of the Consolidated Fund to the service of the year ending on 31st March 1977, to appropriate the supplies granted in this Session of Parliament, and to repeal certain Consolidated Fund and Appropriation Acts.
Drought Act 1976 (repealed)	1976 c. 44	6 August 1976
An Act to confer fresh powers to meet deficiencies in the supply of water due to exceptional shortage of rain and for connected purposes. (Repealed by Water Act 1989 (c. 15))
Rating (Charity Shops) Act 1976	1976 c. 45	6 August 1976
An Act to amend section 40 of the General Rate Act 1967 (Note: General Rate Act 1967 (c. 9)) and section 4 of the Local Government (Financial Provisions etc.) (Scotland) Act 1962 (Note: Local Government (Financial Provisions etc.) (Scotland) Act 1962 (10 & 11 Eliz. 2. c. 9)) as respects charity shops.
Police Act 1976	1976 c. 46	6 August 1976
An Act to Establish a Police Complaints Board with functions relating to complaints from the public against members of police forces in England and Wales; to amend the law relating to the discipline of those forces; and for connected purposes.
Stock Exchange (Completion of Bargains) Act 1976	1976 c. 47	12 October 1976
An Act to amend and clarify the law relating to the transfer of securities and to companies, trustees and personal representatives with a view to simplifying the activities connected with the periodic completion of bargains made on stock exchanges; and for purposes connected therewith.
Parliamentary and other Pensions and Salaries Act 1976	1976 c. 48	12 October 1976
An Act to amend the Parliamentary and other Pensions Act 1972; (Note: Parliamentary and other Pensions Act 1972 (c. 48)) to make further provision with respect to the salaries and pensions payable to or in respect of the Comptroller and Auditor General, the Parliamentary Commissioner for Administration and the Health Service Commissioners; and for connected purposes.
Chronically Sick and Disabled Persons (Amendment) Act 1976	1976 c. 49	26 October 1976
An Act to amend the Chronically Sick and Disabled Persons Act 1970; (Note: Chronically Sick and Disabled Persons Act 1970 (c. 44)) and to provide access and parking facilities for disabled persons at newly provided places of employment in order to improve employment opportunities for disabled persons.
Domestic Violence and Matrimonial Proceedings Act 1976 (repealed)	1976 c. 50	26 October 1976
An Act to amend the law relating to matrimonial injunction; to provide the police with powers of arrest for the breach of injunction in cases of domestic violence; to amend section 1(2) of the Matrimonial Homes Act 1967; (Note: Matrimonial Homes Act 1967 (c. 75)) to make provision for varying rights of occupation where both spouses have the same rights in the matrimonial home; and for purposes connected therewith. (Repealed by Trusts of Land and Appointment of Trustees Act 1996 (c. 47))
Maplin Development Authority (Dissolution) Act 1976 (repealed)	1976 c. 51	26 October 1976
An Act to dissolve the Maplin Development Authority; and for purposes connected therewith. (Repealed by Statute Law (Repeals) Act 1981 (c. 19))
Armed Forces Act 1976	1976 c. 52	26 October 1976
An Act to continue the Army Act 1955, (Note: Army Act 1955 (3 & 4 Eliz. 2. c. 18)) the Air Force Act 1955 (Note: Air Force Act 1955 (3 & 4 Eliz. 2. c. 19)) and the Naval Discipline Act 1957; (Note: Naval Discipline Act 1957 (5 & 6 Eliz. 2. c. 53)) to amend those Acts and other enactments relating to the armed forces; to authorise the establishment of courts for the trial outside the United Kingdom of civilians subject to Part II of the Army Act 1955 or Part II of the Air Force Act 1955; to make provision for the powers of the courts so authorised in relation to such civilians; to make further provision for the powers of courts-martial in relation to such civilians and to civilians subject to Parts I and II of the Naval Discipline Act 1957; to make further provision as to the disqualification of members of the forces for membership of the House of Commons or the Northern Ireland Assembly; to make further provision for Greenwich Hospital; and for connected purposes.
Resale Prices Act 1976 (repealed)	1976 c. 53	26 October 1976
An Act to consolidate those provisions of the Resale Prices Act 1964 (Note: Resale Prices Act 1964 (c. 58)) still having effect, Part II of the Restrictive Trade Practices Act 1956, (Note: Restrictive Trade Practices Act 1956 (4 & 5 Eliz. 2. c. 68)) and related enactments; and to repeal the provisions of the Resale Prices Act 1964 and the Restrictive Trade Practices Act 1968 (Note: Restrictive Trade Practices Act 1968 (c. 66)) which have ceased to have any effect. (Repealed by Competition Act 1998 (c. 41))
Trinidad and Tobago Republic Act 1976	1976 c. 54	26 October 1976
An Act to make provision in connection with Trinidad and Tobago becoming a republic within the Commonwealth.
Agriculture (Miscellaneous Provisions) Act 1976	1976 c. 55	15 November 1976
An Act to dissolve the Sugar Board; to provide for increasing the amount which may be advanced under section 2 of the Agricultural Mortgage Corporation Act 1956; (Note: Agricultural Mortgage Corporation Act 1956 (4 & 5 Eliz. 2. c. 38)) to amend the provisions of Part I of the Agriculture Act 1967 (Note: Agriculture Act 1967 (c. 22)) relating to the Meat and Livestock Commission and their committees; to provide for the making of grants in connection with proficiency tests in crafts related to agriculture; to authorise measures to restrict the growing of male hop plants; to make further provision for obtaining agricultural statistics; to provide for the adaptation of certain enactments to metric units; to provide for regulating the exportation of animals in the interests of their welfare; to make further provision for preventing the transmission of disease from wild life to animals and poultry; to amend the law relating to agricultural holdings; to amend section 29(4) of the Agriculture Act 1970; (Note: Agriculture Act 1970 (c. 40)) and for purposes connected with those matters.
Supplementary Benefit (Amendment) Act 1976 (repealed)	1976 c. 56	15 November 1976
An Act to amend paragraph 23 of Schedule 2 to the Supplementary Benefit Act 1966 (Note: Supplementary Benefit Act 1966 (c. 20)) as respects the earnings of the parent in a one-parent family, and paragraph 24 of that Schedule as respects certain social security and other allowances for children. (Repealed by Supplementary Benefits Act 1976 (c. 71))
Local Government (Miscellaneous Provisions) Act 1976	1976 c. 57	15 November 1976
An Act to make amendments for England and Wales of provisions of the law which relates to local authorities or highways and is commonly amended by local Acts; to alter certain supplemental provisions of the enactments relating to public health; to provide for certain powers of local authorities to execute works to be exercisable outside their areas; to provide for certain future local enactments and orders to have effect subject to certain other enactments; to amend section 126 of the Housing Act 1974; (Note: Housing Act 1974 (c. 44)) and for purposes connected with the matters aforesaid.
International Carriage of Perishable Foodstuffs Act 1976	1976 c. 58	15 November 1976
An Act to enable the United Kingdom to accede to the Agreement on the International Carriage of Perishable Foodstuffs and on the Special Equipment to be Used for such Carriage (ATP); and for purposes connected therewith.
National Health Service (Vocational Training) Act 1976 (repealed)	1976 c. 59	15 November 1976
An Act to require medical practitioners seeking to provide general medical services under the National Health Service Act 1946 (Note: National Health Service Act 1946 (9 & 10 Geo. 6. c. 81)) or the National Health Service (Scotland) Act 1947 (Note: National Health Service (Scotland) Act 1947 (10 & 11 Geo. 6. c. 27)) to be suitably experienced, and for connected purposes. (Repealed for England and Wales by National Health Service Act 1977 (c. 49) and for Scotland by National Health Service (Scotland) Act 1978 (c. 29))
Insolvency Act 1976 (repealed)	1976 c. 60	15 November 1976
An Act to amend the law relating to insolvency; and for connected purposes. (Repealed by Statute Law (Repeals) Act 2004 (c. 14))
Electricity (Financial Provisions) (Scotland) Act 1976 (repealed)	1976 c. 61	15 November 1976
An Act to increase the statutory limits on the amounts outstanding in respect of borrowings by the Scottish Electricity Boards, and to make provision for compensating the North of Scotland Hydro-Electric Board for deficits incurred or to be incurred by that Board in supplying electricity to the British Aluminium Company Limited for the operation of that Company's aluminium reduction plant at Invergordon. (Repealed by Electricity Act 1989 (c. 29))
Motor-Cycle Crash Helmets (Religious Exemption) Act 1976 (Note: Although the term "Crash Helmets" is unhyphenated in the heading to the Queen's Printer edition (which is how the act is invariably cited), the section granting the short title in the act itself deems that the act is the "Motor-Cycle Crash-Helmets (Religious Exemption) Act 1976".) (repealed)	1976 c. 62	15 November 1976
An Act to exempt turban-wearing followers of the Sikh religion from the requirement to wear a crash-helmet when riding a motor-cycle. (Repealed by Road Traffic (Consequential Provisions) Act 1988 (c. 54))
Bail Act 1976	1976 c. 63	15 November 1976
An Act to make provision in relation to bail in or in connection with criminal proceedings in England and Wales, to make it an offence to agree to indemnify sureties in criminal proceedings, to make provision for legal aid limited to questions of bail in certain cases and for legal aid for persons kept in custody for inquiries or reports, to extend the powers of coroners to grant bail and for connected purposes.
Valuation and Rating (Exempted Classes) (Scotland) Act 1976	1976 c. 64	15 November 1976
An Act to make provision as regards Scotland for the exclusion from the valuation roll of lands and heritages which lie wholly or partly on, over or under the bed of the sea; and for connected purposes.
Retirement of Teachers (Scotland) Act 1976 (repealed)	1976 c. 65	15 November 1976
An Act to make further provision as regards Scotland with respect to the age of retirement of teachers. (Repealed by Education (Scotland) Act 1980 (c. 44))
Licensing (Scotland) Act 1976 (repealed)	1976 c. 66	15 November 1976
An Act to make provision as respects the licensing law of Scotland; and for connected purposes. (Repealed by Licensing (Scotland) Act 2005 (asp 16))
Sexual Offences (Scotland) Act 1976 (repealed)	1976 c. 67	15 November 1976
An Act to consolidate certain enactments relating to sexual offences in Scotland. (Repealed by Crime and Punishment (Scotland) Act 1997 (c. 48))
New Towns (Amendment) Act 1976 (repealed)	1976 c. 68	15 November 1976
An Act to provide for the transfer to district councils of the interest of the Commission for the New Towns and development corporations in dwellings and of any associated property, rights, liabilities and obligations; to increase the maximum number of members of development corporations; and for connected purposes. (Repealed by New Towns Act 1981 (c. 64))
Companies Act 1976 (repealed)	1976 c. 69	15 November 1976
An Act to amend the law relating to companies and, in connection therewith, to amend the law relating to the registration of business names. (Repealed by Companies Consolidation (Consequential Provisions) Act 1985 (c. 9))
Land Drainage Act 1976	1976 c. 70	15 November 1976
An Act to consolidate certain enactments relating to land drainage.
Supplementary Benefits Act 1976	1976 c. 71	15 November 1976
An Act to consolidate the Supplementary Benefit Acts 1966 to 1975 and related enactments.
Endangered Species (Import and Export) Act 1976	1976 c. 72	22 November 1976
An Act to restrict the importation and exportation of certain animals, plants and items and to restrict certain transactions in respect of them or their derivatives; to confer on the Secretary of State power to restrict by order the places at which live animals may be imported; to restrict the movement after importation of certain live animals; and for connected purposes.
Industry (Amendment) Act 1976	1976 c. 73	22 November 1976
An Act to increase the limit imposed on the Secretary of State's financial assistance to industry under section 8 of the Industry Act 1972. (Note: Industry Act 1972 (c. 63))
Race Relations Act 1976 (repealed)	1976 c. 74	22 November 1976
An Act to make fresh provision with respect to discrimination on racial grounds and relations between people of different racial groups; and to make in the Sex Discrimination Act 1975 (Note: Sex Discrimination Act 1975 (c. 65)) amendments for bringing provisions in that Act relating to its administration and enforcement into conformity with the corresponding provisions in this Act. (Repealed by Equality Act 2010 (c. 15))
Development of Rural Wales Act 1976 (repealed)	1976 c. 75	22 November 1976
An Act to establish a Development Board for Rural Wales, to confer power on the Secretary of State to pay housing and rent rebate subsidies to the Board, to make provision in relation to certain other bodies concerned with the development of Wales, to confer power on the Secretary of State to give financial assistance to bodies concerned with the social development of Wales and for purposes connected with those purposes. (Repealed by Legislation (Procedure, Publication and Repeals) (Wales) Act 2025 (asc 3))
Energy Act 1976	1976 c. 76	22 November 1976
An Act to make further provision with respect to the nation's resources and use of energy.
Weights and Measures &c. Act 1976	1976 c. 77	22 November 1976
An Act to amend certain enactments relating to weights and measures; and to make provision for the alleviation of shortages of food and other goods.
Industrial Common Ownership Act 1976	1976 c. 78	22 November 1976
An Act to further the development of enterprises controlled by people working in them, and for purposes connected therewith.
Dock Work Regulation Act 1976	1976 c. 79	22 November 1976
An Act to reconstitute the National Dock Labour Board and make further provision for regulating the allocation and performance of the work of cargo-handling in and about the ports of Great Britain.
Rent (Agriculture) Act 1976	1976 c. 80	22 November 1976
An Act to afford security of tenure for agricultural workers housed by their employers, and their successors; to make further provision as to the rents and other conditions of tenure of such persons, including amendments of the Rent Act 1968; (Note: Rent Act 1968 (c. 23)) to impose duties on housing authorities as respects agricultural workers and their successors; and for purposes connected with those matters.
Education Act 1976 (repealed)	1976 c. 81	22 November 1976
An Act to amend the law relating to education. (Repealed by Education Act 1996 (c. 56))
Sexual Offences (Amendment) Act 1976	1976 c. 82	22 November 1976
An Act to amend the law relating to rape.
Health Services Act 1976 (repealed)	1976 c. 83	22 November 1976
An Act to make further provision with respect to the use or acquisition by private patients and others of facilities and supplies available under the National Health Service Acts 1946 to 1973 or the National Health Service (Scotland) Acts 1947 to 1973; to control hospital building outside the National Health Service and provide for the amendment of enactments under which registration is a prerequisite for carrying on a nursing home or private hospital; and for those purposes to establish a Health Services Board. (Repealed by National Health Service and Community Care Act 1990 (c. 19))
Consolidated Fund (No. 2) Act 1976	1976 c. 84	22 December 1976
An Act to apply certain sums out of the Consolidated Fund to the service of the years ending on 31st March 1977 and 1978.
National Insurance Surcharge Act 1976 (repealed)	1976 c. 85	22 December 1976
An Act to impose a surcharge, payable into the Consolidated Fund, on secondary Class 1 contributions under the Social Security Act 1975 (Note: Social Security Act 1975 (c. 14)) and the Social Security (Northern Ireland) Act 1975. (Note: Social Security (Northern Ireland) Act 1975 (c. 15)) (Repealed by Statute Law (Repeals) Act 2013 (c. 2))
Fishery Limits Act 1976	1976 c. 86	22 December 1976
An Act to extend British fishery limits and make further provision in connection with the regulation of sea fishing.

== Local acts ==
Short title	Citation	Royal assent
Long title
British Railways Order Confirmation Act 1976	1976 c. i	4 March 1976
An Act to confirm a Provisional Order under the Private Legislation Procedure (Scotland) Act 1936, (Note: Private Legislation Procedure (Scotland) Act 1936 (26 Geo. 5 & 1 Edw. 8. c. 52)) relating to British Railways.
	British Railways Order 1976 Provisional Order to empower the British Railways Board to construct works and to acquire lands; to confer further powers on the Board; and for other purposes.	
Brownies Taing Pier Order Confirmation Act 1976	1976 c. ii	4 March 1976
An Act to confirm a Provisional Order under the Private Legislation Procedure (Scotland) Act 1936, relating to Brownies Taing Pier.
	Brownies Taing Pier Order 1976 Provisional Order to amend the provisions of the Brownies Taing Pier Orders 1902 and 1917; to confer further powers on the Brownies Taing Pier Trustees; and for other purposes.	
Inverness Harbour (Citadel Quay &c.) Order Confirmation Act 1976	1976 c. iii	4 March 1976
An Act to confirm a Provisional Order under the Private Legislation Procedure (Scotland) Act 1936, relating to Inverness Harbour (Citadel Quay &c.).
	Inverness Harbour (Citadel Quay &c.) Order 1976 Provisional Order to authorise the Trustees of the Harbour of Inverness to carry out works for the improvement of the harbour; to make amendments with respect to the amount of the fines which may be imposed for breach or non-observance of byelaws; and for other purposes.	
Inverness Harbour Order Confirmation Act 1976	1976 c. iv	4 March 1976
An Act to confirm a Provisional Order under the Private Legislation Procedure (Scotland) Act 1936, relating to Inverness Harbour.
	Inverness Harbour Order 1976 Provisional Order to make provision with respect to the qualification, appointment and election of the Trustees of the Harbour of Inverness consequent upon the coming into operation of the Local Government (Scotland) Act 1973; (Note: Local Government (Scotland) Act 1973 (c. 65)) to confer powers on the Highland Regional Council and the Inverness District Council with regard thereto; and for other purposes.	
City of Aberdeen District Council Order Confirmation Act 1976 (repealed)	1976 c. v	4 March 1976
An Act to confirm a Provisional Order under the Private Legislation Procedure (Scotland) Act 1936, relating to City of Aberdeen District Council. (Repealed by Statute Law (Repeals) Act 1998 (c. 43))
	City of Aberdeen District Council Order 1976 Provisional Order to enact provisions with respect to certain premises belonging to the City of Aberdeen District Council, to confer powers on the Council with respect to the provision and sale of excisable liquor at certain premises and with respect to stray dogs; and for other purposes.	
Australian Estates Companies Act 1976	1976 c. vi	27 May 1976
An Act to make provision for the transfer to the State of New South Wales in the Commonwealth of Australia of the registered offices of The Australian Estates Company Limited, New South Wales Pastoral Company Limited and Australian Estates (London) Limited; for the cesser of application to those companies of provisions of the Companies Acts 1948 to 1967; and for other purposes incidental thereto.
Standard Life Assurance Company Act 1976	1976 c. vii	27 May 1976
An Act to confer further powers of borrowing on The Standard Life Assurance Company; and for other purposes.
Railway Clearing System Superannuation Fund Act 1976	1976 c. viii	27 May 1976
An Act to empower the Railway Clearing System Superannuation Fund Corporation to transfer certain assets of the fund of that Corporation to the British Railways Board, the British Transport Docks Board, the London Transport Executive and the National Freight Corporation in respect of certain contributing, non-contributing and superannuated members of that fund; to provide for the establishment of new funds by the bodies to which such assets are transferred and for the transfer of the persons having an interest in the transferred assets to membership of the appropriate new fund; to provide for the dissolution of the said Corporation and of the Council of the said fund; and for other purposes.
Samuel Montagu & Co. Limited Act 1976	1976 c. ix	27 May 1976
An Act to provide for the transfer to Samuel Montagu & Co. Limited of the undertaking of Samuel Montagu (MBFC) Limited and for other purposes incidental thereto and consequential thereon.
Edinburgh Merchant Company Order Confirmation Act 1976 (repealed)	1976 c. x	22 July 1976
An Act to confirm a Provisional Order under the Private Legislation Procedure (Scotland) Act 1936, relating to Edinburgh Merchant Company. (Repealed by Standard Life Assurance Company Act 1991 (c. iii))
	Edinburgh Merchant Company Order 1976 Provisional Order to amend the qualifications for election to membership of The Company of Merchants of the City of Edinburgh; and for other purposes.	
Strathclyde University and Mackintosh School of Architecture Order Confirmation Act 1976	1976 c. xi	22 July 1976
An Act to confirm a Provisional Order under the Private Legislation Procedure (Scotland) Act 1936, relating to Strathclyde University and Mackintosh School of Architecture.
	Strathclyde University and Mackintosh School of Architecture Order 1976 Provisional Order to provide for the inclusion in the composition of the Board of Architectural Education constituted under the Architects (Registration) Act 1931 (Note: Architects (Registration) Act 1931 (21 & 22 Geo. 5. c. 33)) of persons nominated by the School of Architecture, Building Science and Planning of the University of Strathclyde and the Mackintosh School of Architecture of the University of Glasgow.	
Lerwick Harbour Order Confirmation Act 1976	1976 c. xii	22 July 1976
An Act to confirm a Provisional Order under the Private Legislation Procedure (Scotland) Act 1936, relating to Lerwick Harbour.
	Lerwick Harbour Order 1976 Provisional Order to authorise the Trustees of the port and harbour of Lerwick to construct new works in connection with the improvement of the harbour; to confer further powers on the Trustees with respect to the licensing of stevedores; to authorise the Trustees to invest in securities of bodies corporate; and for other purposes.	
Australian Agricultural Company and Subsidiary Companies Act 1976	1976 c. xiii	22 July 1976
An Act to change the name of the Australian Agricultural Company and to make provision for the transfer to the State of New South Wales in the Commonwealth of Australia of the principal office of that company and the registered offices of A. A. & P. Joint Holdings Limited, Union Pastoral Investments Limited and The Peel River Land and Mineral Company Limited; for the cesser of application to those companies of provisions of the Companies Acts 1948 to 1967; and for other purposes incidental thereto.
Nottingham City Council Act 1976	1976 c. xiv	22 July 1976
An Act to confer further powers on the Nottingham City Council in relation to street traders; and for other purposes.
Hove Borough Council Act 1976	1976 c. xv	22 July 1976
An Act to make further provision for preserving uniformity in the exterior of buildings in Brunswick Square, Brunswick Terrace and part of Brunswick Place in the borough of Hove; and for purposes incidental thereto.
Scottish Amicable Life Assurance Society's Act 1976	1976 c. xvi	22 July 1976
An Act to repeal certain provisions of the Scottish Amicable Life Assurance Society's Acts 1849 to 1952 and to make further provision for the regulation and management of the Society; and for other purposes.
British Transport Docks Act 1976	1976 c. xvii	22 July 1976
An Act to empower the British Transport Docks Board to construct works in substitution for works authorised by the British Transport Docks Act 1974 (Note: British Transport Docks Act 1974 (c. xxii)) and to acquire lands and to apply the provisions of the said Act to the substituted works; to extend the time for the compulsory purchase of certain lands; to confer further powers on the Board; and for other purposes.
Foyle and Londonderry College Act 1976	1976 c. xviii	22 July 1976
An Act to provide for the amalgamation of Foyle College and Londonderry High School; and for other purposes.
National Exhibition Centre and Birmingham Municipal Bank Act 1976	1976 c. xix	22 July 1976
An Act to confer powers on the Solihull Borough Council in relation to public safety at the National Exhibition Centre in the borough of Solihull; to continue and extend the powers of the Birmingham City Council in respect of the centre; to authorise the transfer of property held in connection with the Birmingham Municipal Bank; and for other purposes.
Bucks Land and Building Company Act 1976	1976 c. xx	22 July 1976
An Act to exempt Bucks Land and Building Company Limited from the provisions of the Money-lenders Acts 1900 to 1927 until 28th November, 1975; and for other purposes.
Stornoway Harbour Order Confirmation Act 1976	1976 c. xxi	29 July 1976
An Act to confirm a Provisional Order under the Private Legislation Procedure (Scotland) Act 1936, relating to Stornoway Harbour.
	Stornoway Harbour Order 1976 Provisional Order to consolidate with amendments the Stornoway Harbour Orders 1926 to 1948; to amend the constitution of the Stornoway Pier and Harbour Commission; to extend the limits of the harbour under the control of the Commission; to make provision for the control of development within the harbour; to authorise the construction of works; to provide for the control of pilotage at the said harbour; and for other purposes.	
River Medway (Flood Relief) Act 1976	1976 c. xxii	29 July 1976
An Act to provide for the relief of flooding in part of the catchment area of the river Medway; to authorise the Southern Water Authority to construct works and to acquire lands; and for other purposes.
Suffolk Coastal District Council Act 1976	1976 c. xxiii	29 July 1976
An Act to empower the Suffolk Coastal District Council to discontinue their ferry across the river Deben in the Suffolk Coastal District and to confer further powers in relation to that ferry.
Yorkshire Water Authority (River Derwent) Act 1976	1976 c. xxiv	29 July 1976
An Act to confer further powers on the Yorkshire Water Authority to preserve the purity of the water of the navigable stretch of the river Derwent by preventing the discharge of polluting matter from vessels; and for other purposes.
British Railways Act 1976	1976 c. xxv	6 August 1976
An Act to empower the British Railways Board to construct works and to acquire lands; to extend the time for the completion of works; to confer further powers on the Board; and for other purposes.
Greater London Council (General Powers) Act 1976	1976 c. xxvi	6 August 1976
An Act to confer further powers upon the Greater London Council and other authorities; and for other purposes.
Great Northern London Cemetery Act 1976	1976 c. xxvii	12 October 1976
An Act to confirm an agreement between the Great Northern London Cemetery Company and New Southgate Cemetery and Crematorium Limited for the reorganisation and future administration of the cemetery administered by the first-mentioned company under the Great Northern London Cemetery Acts 1855 to 1968; to confer powers on the second-mentioned company with respect to the said cemetery; to authorise the first-mentioned company to dispose of surplus lands; and for other purposes.
Greater London Council (Money) Act 1976	1976 c. xxviii	12 October 1976
An Act to regulate the expenditure on capital account and on lending to other persons by the Greater London Council during the financial period from 1st April 1976 to 30th September 1977; and for other purposes.
Coity Wallia Commons Act 1976	1976 c. xxix	26 October 1976
An Act to alter the constitution of, and to incorporate, the Conservators appointed for the management of the Coity Wallia Commons, to repeal and amend enactments relating to the Conservators and for the management of those commons and to confer further powers on the Conservators; and for other purposes.
Methodist Church Act 1976	1976 c. xxx	26 October 1976
An Act to make further provision concerning the constitution, purposes, doctrinal standards and property of the Methodist Church in Great Britain, to vest in the Trustees for Methodist Church Purposes as custodian trustees all property held upon the trusts of the Model Deed of the Methodist Church and certain other property and to provide for such property to be held upon new model trusts, to declare the said new model trusts and provide for the adoption of such trusts in relation to other property of the Methodist Church; to repeal the Methodist Church Union Act 1929 (Note: Methodist Church Union Act 1929 (19 & 20 Geo. 5. c. lix)) and re-enact with modifications some of the provisions thereof; and for purposes connected with the matters aforesaid.
Royal County of Berkshire (Public Entertainment) Provisional Order Confirmation Act 1976 (repealed)	1976 c. xxxi	15 November 1976
An Act to confirm a Provisional Order made by the Secretary of State under the Local Government Act 1972 (Note: Local Government Act 1972 (c. 70)) relating to the Royal County of Berkshire. (Repealed by Local Government (Miscellaneous Provisions) Act 1982 (c. 30))
	Royal County of Berkshire (Public Entertainment) Order 1976 Provisional Order to extend throughout the Royal County of Berkshire the provisions of the Berkshire County Council Act 1953 (Note: Berkshire County Council Act 1953 (1 & 2 Eliz. 2. c. xli)) relating to the control of public entertainment; and for related purposes.	
East Kilbride District Council Order Confirmation Act 1976 (repealed)	1976 c. xxxii	15 November 1976
An Act to confirm a Provisional Order under the Private Legislation Procedure (Scotland) Act 1936, relating to East Kilbride District Council. (Repealed by Statute Law (Repeals) Act 1995 (c. 44))
	East Kilbride District Council Order 1976 Provisional Order to enact provisions with respect to the provision and sale of excisable liquor in certain premises belonging to or occupied by or provided by the East Kilbride District Council; to confer powers on the Council with respect to stray dogs; and for other purposes.	
Cromarty Harbour Order Confirmation Act 1976	1976 c. xxxiii	15 November 1976
An Act to confirm a Provisional Order under the Private Legislation Procedure (Scotland) Act 1936, relating to Cromarty Harbour.
	Cromarty Harbour Order 1976 Provisional Order to regulate the appointment of additional trustees of Cromarty Harbour.	
Tees Tunnel Act 1976	1976 c. xxxiv	15 November 1976
An Act to authorise the construction of a tunnel for vehicular traffic under the river Tees between the borough of Langbaurgh and the borough of Stockton-on-Tees in the county of Cleveland and approaches to the tunnel; and for connected purposes.
County of South Glamorgan Act 1976	1976 c. xxxv	15 November 1976
An Act to re-enact with amendments and to extend certain local enactments in force within the county of South Glamorgan; to confer further powers on the County Council of South Glamorgan, the Council of the City of Cardiff and the Council of the Borough of Vale of Glamorgan; to make further provision in regard to the environment, local government, improvement and finances of the county and those local authorities; and for other purposes.
Tyne and Wear Act 1976	1976 c. xxxvi	22 November 1976
An Act to re-enact with amendments certain local enactments in force within the county of Tyne and Wear; to confer further powers on the county council of Tyne and Wear and the councils of the city of Newcastle upon Tyne and the boroughs of Gateshead, North Tyneside, South Tyneside and Sunderland; to make further provision in regard to the environment and local government of the county and those local authorities; and for other purposes.
London Transport Act 1976	1976 c. xxxvii	22 November 1976
An Act to empower the London Transport Executive to construct works and to acquire lands; to extend the time for the compulsory purchase of certain lands; to confer further powers on the Executive; and for other purposes.
Scottish Transport Group (Castle Bay Pier) Order Confirmation Act 1976 (repealed)	1976 c. xxxviii	22 December 1976
An Act to confirm a Provisional Order under the Private Legislation Procedure (Scotland) Act 1936, relating to Scottish Transport Group (Castle Bay Pier). (Repealed by Scottish Transport Group (Castle Bay Pier) Empowerment Order 1988 (SI 1988/904))
	Scottish Transport Group (Castle Bay Pier) Order 1976 Provisional Order to authorise the Scottish Transport Group to carry out works at their pier at Castle Bay in the Island of Barra within the Western Isles Islands Area to extend the limits of the pier; and for other purposes.	

== See also ==
- List of acts of the Parliament of the United Kingdom
