= Competition Commission (United Kingdom) =

UK non-ministerial government department

Non-departmental public body overview
- Formed: 1 April 1999
- Preceding Non-departmental public body: Monopolies and Mergers Commission
- Dissolved: 1 April 2014
- Superseding Non-departmental public body: Competition and Markets Authority
- Jurisdiction: UK
- Website: Archived website

The Competition Commission was a non-departmental public body responsible for investigating mergers, markets and other enquiries related to regulated industries under competition law in the United Kingdom. It was a competition regulator under the Department for Business, Innovation and Skills (BIS). It was tasked with ensuring healthy competition between companies in the UK for the ultimate benefit of consumers and the economy.

The Competition Commission replaced the Monopolies and Mergers Commission on 1 April 1999. It was created by the Competition Act 1998, although the majority of its powers were governed by the Enterprise Act 2002.

The Enterprise Act 2002 gave the Competition Commission wider powers and greater independence than the MMC had previously, so that it could make decisions on inquiries rather than giving recommendations to Government, and was also responsible for taking appropriate actions and measures (known as remedies) following inquiries which had identified competition problems.

The Government was still able to intervene on mergers that involve a specified public interest criterion such as media plurality, national security and financial stability.

On 1 April 2014, the Competition Commission was replaced by the Competition and Markets Authority (CMA), which also took over several responsibilities of the Office of Fair Trading.

== History ==
The Monopolies and Restrictive Practices Commission was set up on 1 January 1949, in response to the recommendations of several committees of inquiry into restrictive commercial activity. It was established under the Monopolies and Restrictive Practices (Inquiry and Control) Act 1948. It was reconstituted as the Monopolies Commission on 31 October 1956 by the Restrictive Trade Practices Act 1955, which also set up a Restrictive Practices Court and a registrar of restrictive trading agreements. The commission was again reconstituted, and its powers extended, by the Monopolies and Mergers Act 1965. In 1969 oversight of the Commission passed to the Department of Employment and Productivity, and in 1970 to the Department of Trade and Industry. Under the Fair Trading Act 1973 the Commission became, from 1 November 1973, the Monopolies and Mergers Commission, with wider powers to deal with references either from the Office of Fair Trading or from the Department of Trade and Industry. On 1 April 1999, as a result of the Competition Act 1998, it became the Competition Commission.

== Role ==
The Competition Commission (CC) was an independent public body which conducts in-depth inquiries into mergers, markets and the regulation of the major regulated industries, ensuring healthy competition between companies in the UK for the benefit of companies, customers and the economy.

All of the CC's inquiries were undertaken following a reference made by another authority, most often the Office of Fair Trading (OFT) (which referred merger and market inquiries), or one of the sector regulators (which could refer markets within their sectoral jurisdictions or make regulatory references in relation to price controls and other licence modifications) or as a result of an appeal from a decision of one of the sector regulators.

== Mergers ==
Under the Enterprise Act 2002, the OFT could review mergers to investigate whether there was a realistic prospect that they would lead to a substantial lessening of competition (SLC), unless it obtained undertakings from the merging parties to address its concerns or the market was of insufficient importance.

To qualify for investigation by the OFT, a merger needed to meet all three of the following criteria:

1. two or more enterprises must cease to be distinct;
2. the merger must not have taken place already, or must have taken place not more than four months ago; and
3. one of the following must be true:
  - the business being taken over has a turnover in the UK of at least £70 million; or
  - the combined businesses supply (or acquire) at least 25 per cent of a particular product or service in the UK (or in a substantial part of the UK), and the merger results in an increase in the share of supply or consumption.

In exceptional cases where public interest issues are raised, the Secretary of State could also refer mergers to the CC.

Where an inquiry was referred to the CC for in-depth investigation, the CC had wide-ranging powers to remedy any competition concerns, including preventing a merger from going ahead. It could also require a company to sell off part of its business or take other steps to improve competition.

== Market investigations ==
The Enterprise Act 2002 enabled the OFT (and the sector regulators) to investigate markets and, if they were concerned that there may be competition problems, to refer those markets to the CC for in-depth investigation.

In market investigations the CC had to decide whether any feature or combination of features in a market prevents, restricts or distorts competition, thus constituting an adverse effect on competition (AEC). Before finding out what percentage firms take up, the CC has to 'define the market'. This is when they have to find out which products are in which industries so they know what percentage to do.

If the CC concluded that this was the case, it was required to seek to remedy the problems that it identified either by introducing remedies itself or by recommending action by others.

== Reviews of undertakings or orders ==
Undertakings or orders are the primary means by which remedies were given effect under the Enterprise Act 2002 and the Fair Trading Act 1973. The OFT had the statutory duty to keep these undertakings or orders under review and if it considered that due to a change of circumstances a set of undertakings or an order should be varied or terminated, then the OFT referred it for consideration by the CC. Responsibility for deciding on variation or termination of undertakings lay with the CC.

== Regulatory references ==
In relation to regulatory references, the CC's role was dictated by the relevant sector-specific legislation. Companies regulated under the gas, electricity, water and sewerage, postal services, railways or airports legislation generally had a formal instrument (a licence) setting out the terms of their operation. If a regulated company did not agree to a modification of its licence proposed by the regulator, the regulator was required to refer the question to the CC. The CC then considered whether any matter referred to in the reference could be expected to operate against the public interest and, if so, whether it could be remedied by modifications to the licence. These references could involve the price control applied to the company.

The CC also had roles under the Financial Services and Markets Act 2000 and the Legal Services Act 2007.

== Energy code modifications and Communications Act appeals ==
The CC had an appeal function following decisions by the Gas and Electricity Markets Authority to modify certain energy codes under the Energy Act 2004 and in relation to price control decisions by Ofcom, following a reference by the Competition Appeal Tribunal (CAT) under the Communications Act 2003.

== See also ==
- Competition law
- Competition regulator
- History of competition law
