= Restrictive Practices Court Act 1976 =

Act of the Parliament of the United Kingdom

Restrictive Practices Court Act 1976 (Note: Section 12(1).)
- Act of Parliament
- Parliament of the United Kingdom
- Long title: An Act to consolidate certain enactments relating to the Restrictive Practices Court.
- Citation: 1976 c. 33
- Territorial extent: England and Wales; Scotland; Northern Ireland (Note: Section 12(2).)

Dates
- Royal assent: 22 July 1976
- Commencement: 15 December 1976 (Note: Section 12(3). The Restrictive Practices Court Act 1976 (Commencement) Order 1976 (SI 1976/1896).)
- Repealed: 10 March 2013 (Note: The Competition Act 1998 (Commencement No. 6) Order 2013 (SI 2013/284).)

Other legislation
- Amends: See § Repealed enactments
- Repeals/revokes: See § Repealed enactments
- Amended by: Judicial Pensions Act 1981; Constitutional Reform Act 2005
- Repealed by: Competition Act 1998
- Relates to: Restrictive Trade Practices Act 1976

Status: Repealed

Text of statute as originally enacted

Revised text of statute as amended

The Restrictive Practices Court Act 1976 (c. 33) was an act of the Parliament of the United Kingdom that consolidated enactments relating to the Restrictive Practices Court in the United Kingdom.

The act was passed alongside the Restrictive Trade Practices Act 1976.

== Provisions ==
=== Repealed enactments ===
Section 11(3) of the act repealed 3 enactments, listed in the schedule to the act.

Citation	Short title	Extent of repeal
4 & 5 Eliz. 2. c. 68	Restrictive Trade Practices Act 1956	Sections 2 to 5.
4 & 5 Eliz. 2. c. 68	Restrictive Trade Practices Act 1956	In section 23, subsection (1); in subsection (2), from the beginning of that subsection to the end of paragraph (a); subsection (3).
4 & 5 Eliz. 2. c. 68	Restrictive Trade Practices Act 1956	In the Schedule, paragraphs 1 to 8 and 10 to 12.
1972 c. 11	Superannuation Act 1972	In Schedule 6, paragraph 35.
1973 c. 41	Fair Trading Act 1973	In Schedule 12, the entries so far as they relate to section 23 of the Restrictive Trade Practices Act 1956 and the Schedule to that Act.

== Subsequent developments ==
The whole act was repealed by sections 1(a) and 76(3) of, and part I of schedule 14 to, the Competition Act 1998, which came into force on 10 March 2013.
