= Resale Prices Act 1976 =

Act of the Parliament of the United Kingdom

Resale Prices Act 1976 (Note: Section 30(1).)
- Act of Parliament
- Parliament of the United Kingdom
- Long title: An Act to consolidate those provisions of the Resale Prices Act 1964 still having effect, Part II of the Restrictive Trade Practices Act 1956, and related enactments; and to repeal the provisions of the Resale Prices Act 1964 and the Restrictive Trade Practices Act 1968 which have ceased to have any effect.
- Citation: 1976 c. 53
- Territorial extent: United Kingdom (Note: Section 30(2).)

Dates
- Royal assent: 26 October 1976
- Commencement: 15 December 1976 (Note: Section 30(3). The Resale Prices Act 1976 (Commencement) Order 1976 (SI 1976/1876).)
- Repealed: 1 March 2000 (Note: The Competition Act 1998 (Commencement No. 5) Order 2000 (SI 2000/344).)
Other legislation
Repeals/revokes	See § Repealed enactments
Repealed by	Competition Act 1998

Status: Repealed

Text of statute as originally enacted

Revised text of statute as amended

The Resale Prices Act 1976 (c. 53) was an act of the Parliament of the United Kingdom that consolidated enactments related to resale price maintenance in the United Kingdom.

== Provisions ==
=== Repealed enactments ===
Section 29(2) of the act repealed 7 enactments, listed in parts I and II of schedule 3 to the act.

==== Part I: Consequential repeals ====
Part I — Consequential repeals
Citation	Short title	Extent of repeal
4 & 5 Eliz. 2. c. 68	Restrictive Trade Practices Act 1956	Part II. Sections 35 to 38.
1964 c. 58	Resale Prices Act 1964	Sections 1 to 5. In section 6(5) from the beginning to " and ". Sections 7, 8(2) and (3) and 10 to 14, and the Schedule.
1968 c. 66	Restrictive Trade Practices Act 1968	Sections 14, 15, 16(3)(b) and 17(1).
1973 c. 41	Fair Trading Act 1973	Section 94(2). In section 137(1), the definition of " the Act of 1964 ". In Schedule 12, the entries relating to the Resale Prices Act 1964, and to section 12 of the Restrictive Trade Practices Act 1968.
1976 c. 34	Restrictive Trade Practices Act 1976	In Schedule 5, the entry relating to the Restrictive Trade Practices Act 1956.

==== Part II: Repeals of provisions which have ceased to have any effect ====
Part II — Repeals of provisions of the Resale Prices Act 1964 and the Restrictive Trade Practices Act 1968 which have ceased to have any effect
Citation	Short title	Extent of repeal
1964 c. 58	Resale Prices Act 1964	Section 6(1) to (4). In section 6(5) from " and " to the end. Section 6(6). Section 8(1).
1968 c. 66	Restrictive Trade Practices Act 1968	Section 12 and Schedule 1.

== Subsequent developments ==
The whole act was repealed by section 74(3) of, and part I of schedule 14 to, the Competition Act 1998, which came into force on 1 March 2000.
