= Competition Appeal Tribunal =

Regulator in the United Kingdom

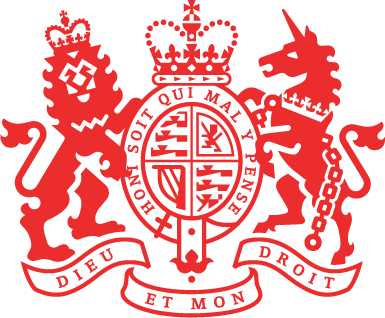
Emblem used by the CAT

The Competition Appeal Tribunal (CAT) of the United Kingdom was created by Section 12 and Schedule 2 to the Enterprise Act 2002 which came into force on 1 April 2003. The Competition Service is an executive non-departmental public body which was created as a support body for the Competition Appeal Tribunal.

== Functions ==
The current functions of the CAT are:

- To hear appeals on the merits in respect of decisions made under the Competition Act 1998 by the Competition and Markets Authority (CMA) and the regulators in the telecommunications, electricity, gas, water, railways and air traffic services sectors.
- To hear actions for damages and other monetary claims under the Competition Act 1998.
- To review decisions made by the Secretary of State, CMA and the Competition Commission in respect of merger and market references or possible references under the Enterprise Act 2002.
- To hear appeals against certain decisions made by Ofcom and the Secretary of State relating to the exercise by Ofcom of its functions under Part 2 (networks, services and the radio spectrum) and sections 290 to 294 and Schedule 11 (networking arrangements for Channel 3) of the Communications Act 2003.
- To hear appeals in respect of decisions made by the CMA under the EC Competition Law (Articles 84 and 85) Enforcement Regulations 2001 (as amended).

== Cases ==
As of January 2024, the tribunal has addressed 623 cases to date. Examples include:

=== Construction bid-rigging ===
In 2011, a number of fines levied by the Office of Fair Trading (OFT) on construction firms found to have engaged in illegal bid-rigging schemes were deemed to be "excessive" and the Tribunal revised the values of the fines. The tribunal decided that the OFT had used turnover figures for the wrong year when calculating fines, and treated the bid-rigging as more serious than it should have done, although in some other respects the OFT's ruling was upheld.

=== Construction cartel ===
In December 2020 the tribunal upheld a decision of the Competition and Markets Authority (CMA) on an appeal from Northern Ireland building firm FP McCann Ltd., who along with other companies had participated in an illegal cartel.

=== Online hotel booking ===
In March 2014, the price-comparison site, Skyscanner, brought a case to the Tribunal, challenging a January 2014 decision by the Office of Fair Trading to settle a probe over pricing of hotel rooms sold online. The OFT's decision had been to accept commitments from a number of online travel agents and InterContinental Hotels Group (IHG). Skyscanner appealed against the OFT's successor, the Competition and Markets Authority, because it believed its business would be affected by the settlement, even though it was not targeted by the investigation. Skyscanner's case was supported by a smaller online travel agent, Skoosh, which had triggered the OFT's original investigation.

In a judgment handed down in September 2014, the Competition Appeal Tribunal quashed the Office of Fair Trading's decision to accept commitments in the online hotel booking sector and the matter was reverted to the CMA for reconsideration.

== Chairs ==
- Marion Simmons (2003-2008)
