= Private school fee fixing scandal =

2005 scandal in the United Kingdom

In September 2005, fifty prominent private schools in the United Kingdom were found guilty of operating a fee-fixing cartel by the Office of Fair Trading. The OFT found that the schools had exchanged details of their planned fee increases over three academic years 2001–02, 2002-03 and 2003–04, in breach of the Competition Act 1998.

The Independent Schools Council – a lobby group funded by the independent schools in question – said that the investigation had been "a scandalous waste of public money".

== Evidence ==
Emails showed that the schools were routinely swapping information about their costs and intended fee changes, as often as four to six times a year as part of a Sevenoaks' Survey. The investigation was prompted by the September 2003 leak of emails to The Times by two Winchester College pupils. Sent by Bill Organ, Winchester College's bursar at the time, to the Warden of the college, they contained details of 20 schools' fees and the phrase: "Confidential please, so we aren’t accused of being a cartel".

== Arguments in support of the schools ==
The Independent Schools Council felt that the action was disproportionate. It was argued that sharing information was common amongst charities (as the schools are classified) and that the aim was to keep fees as low as practicably possible. Until 2000, when the Competition Act 1998 displaced the Restrictive Trade Practices Act 1976, the practice was lawful, as the schools were exempt from the anti-cartel laws that applied to businesses.

Jean Scott, the head of the Independent Schools Council, said that independent schools had always been exempt from anti-cartel rules applied to business, were following a long-established procedure in sharing the information with each other, and that they were unaware of the change to the law (on which they had not been consulted). She wrote to John Vickers, the OFT director-general, saying, "They are not a group of businessmen meeting behind closed doors to fix the price of their products to the disadvantage of the consumer. They are schools that have quite openly continued to follow a long-established practice because they were unaware that the law had changed."

Jonathan Shephard, Chief Executive of the ISC, stated: "This is a Kafkaesque situation... the law seems to have changed without Parliament realising – and without the independent sector being consulted – contrary to the government's own strict guidelines on consultation. Schools are now being held liable for breaking a law which no-one knew applied to them". He added: "The OFT's broad assertion that sharing information produced higher fees is highly contentious."

== Schools involved ==
- Ampleforth College
- Bedford School
- Benenden School
- Bradfield College
- Bromsgrove School
- Bryanston School
- Canford School
- Charterhouse School
- Cheltenham College
- Cheltenham Ladies' College
- Clifton College
- Cranleigh School
- Dauntsey's School
- Downe House School
- Eastbourne College
- Epsom College
- Eton College
- Gresham's School
- Haileybury School
- Harrow School
- King's School, Canterbury
- Lancing College
- Malvern College
- Marlborough College
- Millfield School
- Mill Hill School
- Oakham School
- Oundle School
- Radley College
- Repton School
- Royal Hospital School
- Rugby School
- St Edward's School, Oxford
- St Leonards-Mayfield School
- Sedbergh School
- Sevenoaks School
- Sherborne School
- Shrewsbury School
- Stowe School
- Strathallan School
- Tonbridge School
- Truro School
- Uppingham School
- Wellington College
- Wells Cathedral School
- Westminster School
- Winchester College
- Woldingham School
- Worth School
- Wycombe Abbey School

For Truro and Sedbergh Schools, the OFT's preliminary findings are that they took part in the Sevenoaks Survey in only two of the three years investigated.

== Resolution ==
The OFT released a 500-page statement which was summed up thus:

This regular and systematic exchange of confidential information as to intended fee increases was anti-competitive and resulted in parents being charged higher fees than would otherwise have been the case.

However, on final publication this was changed to:

The Office of Fair Trading has found that the Participant schools infringed the prohibition imposed by section 2(1) of the Competition Act 1998 by participating in an agreement and/or concerted practice having as its object the prevention, restriction or distortion of competition in the relevant markets for the provision of educational services. The OFT makes no finding as to the effect of the infringement.

The response to the OFT investigation was co-ordinated by the Independent Schools Council's Chief Executive, Jonathan Shephard, with a negotiating team including Lord (Nicholas) Lyell, the former Attorney General; the solicitor and mediator Tony Willis, and the businessman Sir Bob Reid. One of the principal aims of the negotiation was to ensure that financial payments by the schools should go to a charitable trust rather than to the Treasury: this followed a United States example where a sportswear firm had agreed to provide sports facilities in settlement of a competition law claim. The ISC negotiating team wanted the charitable trust to benefit children from disadvantaged backgrounds, but OFT insisted on the fund benefiting pupils from the 50 schools at the relevant time.

All the schools involved were given fines of £10,000 each for their infringement, with a 50% reduction to £5,000 for Eton and Winchester for early co-operation. Additionally the schools agreed to pay £3 million into a trust fund aimed to benefit the pupils attending the schools during the period involved; it has been stressed that the trust fund is not a fine. The schools paid in equal instalments over five years, finishing in 2010, with an average cost of about £70,000 each. Broadly speaking, the payments were approximately 0.7% of the relevant turnover during the years of the infringement. The low percentage is largely down to the fact that the change to the law was not notified to schools. Additionally, the settlement was on the basis that all 50 schools accepted the settlement proposal.

The impact of the OFT's case on day and boarding fees set subsequently by the schools has been analysed. Research indicates that resolving the case had an insignificant impact on fees levels, though independent school fees may have increased faster during the OFT investigation due to fears of possible future regulation.
