= Restrictive Trade Practices Act 1976 =

Act of the Parliament of the United Kingdom

Restrictive Trade Practices Act 1976 (Note: Section 45(1).)
- Act of Parliament
- Parliament of the United Kingdom
- Long title: An Act to consolidate the enactments relating to restrictive trade practices.
- Citation: 1976 c. 34
- Territorial extent: England and Wales; Scotland; Northern Ireland (Note: Section 45(2).)

Dates
- Royal assent: 22 July 1976
- Commencement: 15 December 1976 (Note: Section 45(3). The Restrictive Trade Practices Act 1976 (Commencement) Order 1976 (SI 1976/1877).)
- Repealed: 1 March 2000 (Note: The Competition Act 1998 (Commencement No. 5) Order 2000 (SI 2000/344).)

Other legislation
- Amends: See § Repealed enactments
- Repeals/revokes: Restrictive Trade Practices Act 1956; Agricultural and Forestry Associations Act 1962; Restrictive Trade Practices Act 1968
- Amended by: Resale Prices Act 1976; Restrictive Trade Practices Act 1977; Patents Act 1977; Estate Agents Act 1979; Nurses, Midwives and Health Visitors Act 1979; Competition Act 1980; Magistrates' Courts Act 1980; Magistrates' Courts (Northern Ireland) Order 1981; Merchant Shipping(Liner Conferences) Act 1982; Dentists Act 1984; Housing Defects Act 1984; Telecommunications Act 1984; Companies Consolidation (Consequential Provisions) Act 1985; Insolvency Act 1985; Housing Act 1985; Transport Act 1985; Administration of Justice Act 1985; Financial Services Act 1986; Airports Act 1986; Gas Act 1986; Insolvency Act 1986; v; Companies Consolidation (Consequential Provisions) (Northern Ireland) Order 1986; Housing (Scotland) Act 1987; Copyright, Designs and Patents Act 1988; Control of Misleading Advertisements Regulations 1988; Electricity Act 1989; Water Act 1989; Companies Act 1989; Broadcasting Act 1990; Courts and Legal Services Act 1990; New Roads and Street Works Act 1991; Water Consolidation (Consequential Provisions) Act 1991; Electricity (Northern Ireland) Order 1992; Railways Act 1993; Trade Marks Act 1994; Deregulation and Contracting Out Act 1994; Coal Industry Act 1994; Airports (Northern Ireland) Order 1994; Criminal Procedure (Consequential Provisions) (Scotland) Act 1995; Education Act 1996; Deregulation (Restrictive Trade Practices Act 1976) (Amendment) (Time Limits) Order 1996; Deregulation (Restrictive Trade Practices Act 1976) (Amendment) (Variation of Exempt Agreements) Order 1996; Gas (Northern Ireland) Order 1996; EC Competition Law (Articles 88 and 89) Enforcement Regulations 1996; Plant Varieties Act 1997
- Repealed by: Competition Act 1998
- Relates to: Restrictive Practices Court Act 1976

Status: Repealed

Text of statute as originally enacted

Revised text of statute as amended

The Restrictive Trade Practices Act 1976 (c. 34) was an act of the Parliament of the United Kingdom that consolidated enactments relating to restrictive trade practices in the United Kingdom.

The act was passed alongside the Restrictive Practices Court Act 1976.

== Provisions ==
=== Repealed enactments ===
Section 44(b) of the act repealed 6 enactments, listed in schedule 6 to the act.

Citation	Short title	Extent of repeal
4 & 5 Eliz. 2. c. 68	Restrictive Trade Practices Act 1956	Section 1. Sections 6 to 17. Sections 19 to 22. In section 23, in subsection (2), paragraphs (b) to (d). Section 30. In the Schedule, paragraph 9.
1962 c. 29	Agricultural and Forestry Associations Act 1962	The whole act.
1968 c. 34	Agriculture (Miscellaneous Provisions) Act 1968	Section 44.
1968 c. 66	Restrictive Trade Practices Act 1968	The whole act, except sections 12, 14, 15, 16(3)(b), 17(1) and Schedule 1.
1972 c. 68	European Communities Act 1972	Section 10.
1973 c. 41	Fair Trading Act 1973	In section 54(5), the words "Part I of" where they appear before the words "that Act". In section 94(2) the words "the Act of 1956" and the words "and the Act of 1968". Sections 95 to 106. Part X. Section 128. In section 133, in subsection (1), the words "or under or by virtue of the Act of 1956 or the Act of 1968"; and in subsection (4), paragraph (b). In section 137, in subsection (1), the reference to "the Act of 1968"; in subsection (2), the words "except in Part X"; in subsection (3), the words "other than Part X (and without prejudice to the construction of that Part in accordance with section 117 of this Act)" and the words "with that exception"; in subsection (4), the words "except Part X"; and in subsection (5) the words "other than Part X". In section 140, subsection (2). Schedule 10. In Schedule 11, paragraphs 12 and 13. In Schedule 12, the entries relating to—(a) the Restrictive Trade Practices Act 1956 (except so far as they relate to section 23 of that Act and to the Schedule to that Act); (b) the Restrictive Trade Practices Act 1968 (except so far as they relate to section 12 of that Act); and (c) the European Communities Act 1972.

== Subsequent developments ==
The whole act was repealed by section 74(3) of, and schedule 14 to, the Competition Act 1998, which came into force on 1 March 2000.
