= Marion Simmons =

British judge

The Honourable Mrs Justice Simmons
- Royal coat of arms of the United Kingdom

Chair of the Competition Appeal Tribunal
- In office 2003–2008
- Appointed by: Elizabeth II

Personal details
- Born: 11 April 1949
- Died: 2 May 2008 (aged 59)
- Education: Hendon County Grammar School; Queen Mary College, London

Marion Adèle Simmons (11 April 1949 – 2 May 2008) was a British judge who was chairman of the Competition Appeal Tribunal.

== Biography ==
Simmons grew up in Finchley and attended a Jewish primary school before studying at Hendon County Grammar School and Queen Mary College, London. She was appointed assistant recorder in 1990 and recorder in 1994, taking silk the same year. She was appointed Queen's Counsel in 1997. In 2003, she became chairman of the Competition Appeal Tribunal. She also served on a number of other bodies. In October 2007 she was appointed to chair the panel of the Medicines and Healthcare Products Regulatory Agency.

Simmons died in 2008. She had been diagnosed with cancer. The Marion Simmons Scholarship is given by Gray's Inn. Association of Regulatory and Disciplinary Lawyers has a Marion Simmons QC Prize for essay writing.
