= Resale Prices Acts =

Acts of the Parliament of the United Kingdom

Resale Prices Act 1964 (Note: Section 14(1).)
- Act of Parliament
- Parliament of the United Kingdom
- Long title: An Act to restrict the maintenance by contractual and other means of minimum resale prices in respect of goods supplied for resale in the United Kingdom; and for purposes connected therewith.
- Citation: 1964 c. 58
- Territorial extent: United Kingdom (Note: Section 12.)

Dates
- Royal assent: 16 July 1964
- Commencement: Various (Note: Section 14(2).)
Other legislation
Amended by	Resale Prices Act 1976

Status: Repealed

Text of statute as originally enacted

The Resale Prices Act 1964 (c. 58) was an act of the Parliament of the United Kingdom which when passed, now considered all resale price agreements to be against public interest unless proven otherwise.

Minimum resale price maintenance (MRPM) had ensured that retailers could only sell a product at a price determined by the manufacturer. The abolition of MRPM allowed such retailers to expand; for instance Comet transformed from a small electrical retail chain in Yorkshire to a national discount retailer.

The Resale Prices Act 1976 (c. 53) was repealed on 1 March 2000; UK competition law having been previously incorporated into the Competition Act 1998.
