= Restrictive Trade Practices Act 1956 =

Act of the Parliament of the United Kingdom

Restrictive Trade Practices Act 1956 (Note: Section 38.)
- Act of Parliament
- Parliament of the United Kingdom
- Long title: An Act to provide for the registration and judicial investigation of certain restrictive trading agreements, and for the prohibition of such agreements when found contrary to the public interest; to prohibit the collective enforcement of conditions regulating the resale price of goods, and to make further provision for the individual enforcement of such conditions by legal proceedings; to amend the Monopolies and Restrictive Practices Acts, 1948[y] and 1953;[z] to provide for the appointment of additional judges of the High Court and of the Court of Session; and for other purposes connected with the matters aforesaid.
- Citation: 4 & 5 Eliz. 2. c. 68
- Territorial extent: England and Wales; Scotland; Northern Ireland (Note: Section 37.)

Dates
- Royal assent: 2 August 1956
- Commencement: 2 September 1956 (part I) (Note: Section 27.)
- Repealed: 15 December 1976 (Note: The Resale Prices Act 1976 (Commencement) Order 1976 (SI 1976/1876), the Restrictive Trade Practices Act 1976 (Commencement) Order 1976 (SI 1976/1877) and the Restrictive Practices Court Act 1976 (Commencement) Order 1976 (SI 1976/1896))
Other legislation
| Amended by | Agricultural and Forestry Associations Act 1962; Plant Varieties and Seeds Act 1964; Restrictive Trade Practices Act 1968; Consumer Credit Act 1974 |
| Repealed by | Restrictive Practices Court Act 1976; Restrictive Trade Practices Act 1976; Resale Prices Act 1976 |
| Relates to | Monopolies and Restrictive Practices Act 1948; Monopolies and Restrictive Practices Act 1953 |

Status: Repealed

Text of statute as originally enacted

The Restrictive Trade Practices Act 1956 (4 & 5 Eliz. 2. c. 68) was an act of the Parliament of the United Kingdom intended to enforce competition, and provide an appropriate check on restrictive combines and practices. It required that any agreement between companies that restricted trading should be placed on a public register unless granted exemption by the Secretary of State. Changes to an agreement, including its ending, were required to be notified and no agreement could be brought into force before appearing on the register.

The registrar could refer any agreements which appeared to operate against the public interest to the Restrictive Practices Court, a senior court of record in the United Kingdom. Though the court was overhauled by the Restrictive Practices Court Act 1976 (c. 33), by the end of the century, the legislation was perceived as increasingly out of line with Articles 81 and 82 of the Treaty of Rome. The court was gradually replaced by a new judicial regime under the Competition Act 1998 and Enterprise Act 2002, and was ultimately disestablished on 10 March 2013.
