= Fair Trading Act 1973 =

Act of the Parliament of the United Kingdom

Fair Trading Act 1973 (Note: Section 140(1).)
- Act of Parliament
- Parliament of the United Kingdom
- Long title: An Act to provide for the appointment of a Director General of Fair Trading and of a Consumer Protection Advisory Committee, and to confer on the Director General and the Committee so appointed, on the Secretary of State, on the Restrictive Practices Court and on certain other courts new functions for the protection of consumers; to make provision, in substitution for the Monopolies and Restrictive Practices (Inquiry and Control) Act 1948 and the Monopolies and Mergers Act 1965, for the matters dealt with in those Acts and related matters, including restrictive labour practices; to amend the Restrictive Trade Practices Act 1956 and the Restrictive Trade Practices Act 1968, to make provision for extending the said Act of 1956 to agreements relating to services, and to transfer to the Director General of Fair Trading the functions of the Registrar of Restrictive Trading Agreements; to make provision with respect to pyramid selling and similar trading schemes; to make new provision in place of section 30(2) to (4) of the Trade Descriptions Act 1968; and for purposes connected with those matters.
- Citation: 1973 c. 41
- Introduced by: Lord Drumalbyn, Minister without Portfolio (Lords)
- Territorial extent: England and Wales; Scotland; Northern Ireland (Note: Section 140(5).)

Dates
- Royal assent: 25 July 1973
- Commencement: 14 September 1973 (in part) (Note: Section 140(3). The Fair Trading Act 1973 (Commencement No. 1) Order 1973.); 1 November 1973 (rest of act) (Note: Section 140(3). The Fair Trading Act 1973 (Commencement No. 2) Order 1973.)
Other legislation
Amends	Agricultural Marketing Act 1958
Amended by	Legal Aid Act 1974; House of Commons Disqualification Act 1975; Northern Ireland Assembly Disqualification Act 1975; Iron and Steel Act 1975; Restrictive Practices Court Act 1976; Restrictive Trade Practices Act 1976; Resale Prices Act 1976; Statute Law (Repeals) Act 1977; Judicial Pensions Act 1981; Dentists Act 1984; Weights and Measures Act 1985; Airports Act 1986; Legal Aid (Scotland) Act 1986; Water Act 1989; Electricity Act 1989; Coal Industry Act 1994; Gas Act 1995; Statute Law (Repeals) Act 2004; Digital Economy Act 2017
Relates to	Monopolies and Restrictive Practices (Inquiry and Control) Act 1948; Monopolies and Mergers Act 1965; Restrictive Trade Practices Act 1956; Restrictive Trade Practices Act 1968; Trade Descriptions Act 1968

Status: Amended

History of passage through Parliament

Text of statute as originally enacted

Text of the Fair Trading Act 1973 as in force today (including any amendments) within the United Kingdom, from legislation.gov.uk.

The Fair Trading Act 1973 (c. 41) is an act of the Parliament of the United Kingdom.
