= Enterprise Act 2002 =

Act of the Parliament of the United Kingdom

Enterprise Act 2002 (Note: Section 181.)
- Act of Parliament
- Parliament of the United Kingdom
- Long title: An Act to establish and provide for the functions of the Office of Fair Trading, the Competition Appeal Tribunal and the Competition Service; to make provision about mergers and market structures and conduct; to amend the constitution and functions of the Competition Commission; to create an offence for those entering into certain anti-competitive agreements; to provide for the disqualification of directors of companies engaging in certain anti-competitive practices; to make other provision about competition law; to amend the law relating to the protection of the collective interests of consumers; to make further provision about the disclosure of information obtained under competition and consumer legislation; to amend the Insolvency Act 1986 and make other provision about insolvency; and for connected purposes.
- Citation: 2002 c. 40
- Introduced by: Patricia Hewitt, Secretary of State for Trade and Industry
- Territorial extent: United Kingdom (Note: Section 180.)

Dates
- Royal assent: 7 November 2002
- Commencement: Various (Note: Section 179.)
Other legislation
Amends	Registered Designs Act 1949; Agricultural Marketing Act 1958; House of Commons Disqualification Act 1975; Magistrates' Courts Act 1980; Airports Act 1986; Company Directors Disqualification Act 1986; Criminal Justice Act 1988; Courts and Legal Services Act 1990; Water Industry Act 1991; Water Consolidation (Consequential Provisions) Act 1991; Social Security (Consequential Provisions) Act 1992; Coal Industry Act 1994; Terrorism Act 2000; Postal Services Act 2000; Anti-terrorism, Crime and Security Act 2001
Amended by	Fireworks Act 2003; Human Tissue Act 2004; Railways Act 2005; Postal Services Act 2011; Co-operative and Community Benefit Societies Act 2014; Scotland Act 2016; Digital Economy Act 2017; Corporate Insolvency and Governance Act 2020; National Security and Investment Act 2021; Energy Act 2023; Digital Markets, Competition and Consumers Act 2024
Relates to	Competition Act 1998

Status: Amended

Text of statute as originally enacted

Revised text of statute as amended

The Enterprise Act 2002 (c. 40) is an act of the Parliament of the United Kingdom which made major changes to UK competition law with respect to mergers and also changed the law governing insolvency bankruptcy.

It made cartels illegal with a maximum prison sentence of five years and states that level of competition in a market should be the basis for investigation.

== Structure ==
- Part 1: The Office of Fair Trading (ss 1-11)
- Part 2: The Competition Appeal Tribunal (ss 12-21)
- Part 3: Mergers
  - Chapter 1: Duty to make references (ss 22-41)
  - Chapter 2: Public interest cases (ss 42-58)
  - Chapter 3: Other special cases (ss 59-70)
  - Chapter 4: Enforcement (ss 71-95)
  - Chapter 5: Supplementary (ss 96-130
- Part 4: Market Investigations
  - Chapter 1: Market investigation references (ss 131-138)
  - Chapter 2: Public interest cases
  - Chapter 3: Enforcement
  - Chapter 4: Supplementary (ss 168-184)
- Part 5: The Competition Commission (ss 185-187)
- Part 6: Cartel offence (ss 188-202)
- Part 7: Miscellaneous Competition Provisions (ss 203-209)
- Part 8: Enforcement of certain consumer legislation (ss 210-236)
- Part 9: Information (ss 237-247)
- Part 10: Insolvency (ss 248-272)
- Part 11: Supplementary (ss 273-281)
- Schedules

== Competition policy ==
The Act had four major competition policy objectives:

- Make all competition decisions through independent bodies
- Root out forms of anti-competitive behaviour,
- Create a strong deterrent effect, to redress injured parties in distortions of competition
- Raise the profile of competition policy in the UK.

The act made the Office of Fair Trading formally independent from government, and gave it additional powers. It is now possible for searches to be carried out under warrant from this act of business premises involved with potentially prohibitable mergers. The act also established the Commission Appeals Tribunal (CAT) for companies to appeal against decisions by the Competition Commission. The role of the Director General of Fair Trading (DGFT) was also abolished and his powers given to the OFT, this was seen as an attempt to depersonalize the competition investigation process. The Minister of Trade and Industry in the past played a large role in competition policy, having final say over whether a particular merger was in the public interest. Under the new Act his role was significantly diminished in order to de-politicize competition regulation which had been accused of being inconsistent in the past. He now only has powers to intervene if the proposed merger will affect the media to the detriment of the public, national security or if one of the firms is a government contractor.

On the deterrence side of the act, jail terms of a maximum of five years for directors was introduced in order to increase deterrence for forming cartels. The competition commission also had its scope widened to cover investigations of whole industries, not just specific firm, for example the supermarket industry.

Price-fixing became a criminal offence under the act.

== Insolvency reforms ==
=== Companies ===
The act rewrote the law in relation to administration.

The Enterprise Act made substantial amendments to the administration procedures for failing companies. The purpose was to enhance the policy of creating a "rescue culture", so that insolvent companies so far as possible should be saved, before their assets are stripped and distributed to creditors.

- s 248: Replacement of Part II of Insolvency Act 1986
- s 249: Special administration regimes
- s 250: Prohibition of appointment of administrative receiver
- s 251: Abolition of Crown preference
- s 252: Unsecured creditors
- s 253: Liquidator's powers
- s 254: Application of insolvency law to foreign company
- s 255: Application of law about company arrangement or administration to non-company

=== Individuals ===
Since 1 April 2004, there have been considerable changes to the laws concerning bankruptcy in England. Previously, bankruptcy would typically last for a period of between 2 and 3 years, but now the majority of bankruptcies will be discharged after only 12 months. The law was changed to give those with genuine cases of financial hardship the opportunity to be free of their indebtedness. For those who have tried, unsuccessfully, to resolve their financial difficulties, the new laws allow them to petition for their own bankruptcy and start again.

Additional changes also mean that there are harsher restrictions for those who have previously been made bankrupt and those who have been through criminal bankruptcy. Individuals who previously had an undischarged bankruptcy during the 15 years before the current bankruptcy (unless the previous bankruptcy was annulled) were automatically discharged on 1 April 2009.

A bankrupt may ask the court for a discharge 5 years after the date of the bankruptcy order, but the court can refuse or delay the discharge, or grant it conditionally on terms requiring some payments to be made out of the individual'a income. A person can become free from bankruptcy immediately if the court annuls (cancels) the bankruptcy order, which normally happens when the debts (including any fees and expenses of the bankruptcy proceedings) have been paid in full or if the bankruptcy order was made in error.

Alternatively, if a person has failed to carry out their responsibilities under the bankruptcy proceedings, the Official Receiver may apply to the court to delay the discharge from bankruptcy. If the court is in agreement, the bankruptcy order cannot end unless the suspension has been lifted and the time remaining on the bankruptcy period has run out.

How assets are treated

There is now a limit of 3 years (either from the date of the Bankruptcy Order or from when the Official Receiver/Trustee first became aware of the Bankrupt's interest in the property), during which the Trustee in Bankruptcy (this may be the Official Receiver but far more likely to be an Insolvency Practitioner, normally an accountant, since the Official Receiver's staff have little experience or training in the litigation involved) must deal with the debtor's main residence. There is no time limit for dealing with other assets or properties. If the Official Receiver fails to realize the property during this time, the property will revest in the (ex-)bankrupt.

If it is believed that the debtor has brought about the bankruptcy through its own irresponsible or imprudent conduct, there are now more severe consequences. If this is the case, the Official Receiver can apply for a Bankruptcy Restriction Order, which may be applicable for between 2 and 15 years, in addition to the normal length of discharge.

Examples of such situations are the failure to produce or retain records, incurring debts as a result of gambling and incurring debts that have arisen as a result of precarious or risky conjecture.

Additionally, the usual cost to an individual that wishes to petition for their own bankruptcy has risen from £460 to £510 as of 1 April 2008.

Provisions

- s 256: Duration of bankruptcy
- s 257: Post-discharge restrictions
- s 258: Investigation by official receiver
- s 259: Income payments order
- s 260: Income payments agreement
- s 261: Bankrupt's home
- s 262: Powers of trustee in bankruptcy
- s 263: Repeal of certain bankruptcy offences
- s 264: Individual voluntary arrangement
- s 265: Disqualification from office: justice of the peace
- s 266: Disqualification from office: Parliament
- s 267: Disqualification from office: local government
- s 268: Disqualification from office: general
- s 269: Minor and consequential amendments

== Amendments ==
The act was amended to allow the government to intervene if a business involved in a pandemic response was the target of a foreign firm.

== See also ==
- Office of Fair Trading
