= List of statutory instruments of the United Kingdom, 1976 =

This is an incomplete list of statutory instruments of the United Kingdom in 1976.

== Statutory instruments ==
=== 1-1000 ===
==== 1–99 ====
- Unsolicited Goods and Services (Northern Ireland) Order 1976 (SI 1976/57) (N.I. 1)
- Act of Sederunt (Legal Aid Rules Amendment) 1976 (SI 1976/60)
- District of Welwyn Hatfield (Electoral Arrangements) Order 1976 (SI 1976/65)
- District of South Shropshire (Electoral Arrangements) Order 1976 (SI 1976/67)

==== 100–199 ====
- City of Nottingham (Electoral Arrangements) Order 1976 (SI 1976/114)
- Borough of Tunbridge Wells (Electoral Arrangements) Order 1976 (SI 1976/115)
- Borough of Ribble Valley (Electoral Arrangements) Order 1976 (SI 1976/161)
- District of Staffordshire Moorlands (Electoral Arrangements) Order 1976 (SI 1976/174)
- District of Ashfield (Electoral Arrangements) Order 1976 (SI 1976/180)
- District of Cannock Chase (Electoral Arrangements) Order 1976 (SI 1976/181)
- District of Tynedale (Electoral Arrangements) Order 1976 (SI 1976/182)
- Darlington and Sedgefield (Areas) Order 1976 (SI 1976/187)
- Glanford and Scunthorpe (Areas) Order 1976 (SI 1976/188)
- District of North Shropshire (Electoral Arrangements) Order 1976 (SI 1976/196)
- Borough of Ellesmere Port (Electoral Arrangements) Order 1976 (SI 1976/197)

==== 200–299 ====
- Borough of Burnley (Electoral Arrangements) Order 1976 (SI 1976/204)
- Treatment of Offenders (Northern Ireland) Order 1976 (SI 1976/226) (N.I. 4)
- Local Government Area Changes Regulations 1976 (SI 1976/246)
- District of West Lancashire (Electoral Arrangements) Order 1976 (SI 1976/248)
- Borough of Milton Keynes (Electoral Arrangements) Order 1976 (SI 1976/284)
- District of South Northamptonshire (Electoral Arrangements) Order 1976 (SI 1976/285)
- District of Vale Royal (Electoral Arrangements) Order 1976 (SI 1976/286)
- City of Winchester (Electoral Arrangements) Order 1976 (SI 1976/287)
- Borough of Woking (Electoral Arrangements) Order 1976 (SI 1976/288)
- Borough of Halton (Electoral Arrangements) Order 1976 (SI 1976/296)
- District of Kennet (Electoral Arrangements) Order 1976 (SI 1976/297)
- Borough of Rossendale (Electoral Arrangements) Order 1976 (SI 1976/298)

==== 300–399 ====
- Police Pensions (Amendment) Regulations 1976 (SI 1976/306)
- District of Hart (Electoral Arrangements) Order 1976 (SI 1976/318)
- District of Hertsmere (Electoral Arrangements) Order 1976 (SI 1976/319)
- Legal Aid (Scotland) (General) Amendment Regulations 1976 (SI 1976/333)
- Act of Adjournal (Criminal Legal Aid Fees Amendment) 1976 (SI 1976/339)
- Lochaber, Skye and Lochalsh Districts (Boundaries) Order 1976 (SI 1976/340) (S. 26)
- City of Peterborough (Electoral Arrangements) Order 1976 (SI 1976/343)
- Act of Adjournal (Rules for Legal Aid in Criminal Proceedings Amendment) 1976 (SI 1976/371)
- Act of Sederunt (Legal Aid Rules and Legal Aid Fees Amendment) 1976 (SI 1976/373)
- District of New Forest (Electoral Arrangements) Order 1976 (SI 1976/379)
- Borough of Havant (Electoral Arrangements) Order 1976 (SI 1976/380)
- Industrial Training (Transfer of the Activities of Establishments) Order 1976 (SI 1976/396)

==== 400–499 ====
- District of Huntingdon (Electoral Arrangements) Order 1976 (SI 1976/401)
- Department of Housing, Local Government and Planning (Dissolution) (Northern Ireland) Order 1976 (SI 1976/424) (N.I. 6)
- Industrial and Provident Societies (Amendment) (Northern Ireland) Order 1976 (SI 1976/425) (N.I. 7)
- Evidence (European Court) Order 1976 (SI 1976/428)

=== 500-999 ===
==== 500–599 ====
- Legal Aid (Scotland) (Extension of Proceedings) Regulations 1976 (SI 1976/512)
- Solicitors (Northern Ireland) Order 1976 (SI 1976/582) (N.I. 12)

==== 600–699 ====
- Social Security (Medical Evidence) Regulations 1976 (SI 1976/615)

==== 700–799 ====
- District of Eden (Electoral Arrangements) Order 1976 (SI 1976/750)
- District of Mansfield (Electoral Arrangements) Order 1976 (SI 1976/751)
- District of Mendip (Electoral Arrangements) Order 1976 (SI 1976/752)
- Borough of Stafford (Electoral Arrangements) Order 1976 (SI 1976/753)
- Borough of Taunton Deane (Electoral Arrangements) Order 1976 (SI 1976/754)
- Borough of Wyre (Electoral Arrangements) Order 1976 (SI 1976/755)
- District of Alnwick (Electoral Arrangements) Order 1976 (SI 1976/764)
- Borough of Blyth Valley (Electoral Arrangements) Order 1976 (SI 1976/765)
- Legal Aid in Criminal Proceedings (General) (Amendment) Regulations 1976 (SI 1976/790)

==== 800–899 ====
- District of Mid Bedfordshire (Electoral Arrangements) Order 1976 (SI 1976/808)
- District of Maldon (Electoral Arrangements) Order 1976 (SI 1976/809)
- District of Neward (Electoral Arrangements) Order 1976 (SI 1976/810)
- District of East Northamptonshire (Electoral Arrangements) Order 1976 (SI 1976/811)
- District of West Somerset (Electoral Arrangements) Order 1976 (SI 1976/812)
- Borough of Beverley (Electoral Arrangements) Order 1976 (SI 1976/822)
- Borough of Kettering (Electoral Arrangements) Order 1976 (SI 1976/823)
- District of Braintree (Electoral Arrangements) Order 1976 (SI 1976/831)
- Borough of Darlington (Electoral Arrangements) Order 1976 (SI 1976/832)
- District of Lichfield (Electoral Arrangements) Order 1976 (SI 1976/833)
- Harbour of Rye Revision Order 1976 (SI 1976/855)
- District of Castle Point (Electoral Arrangements) Order 1976 (SI 1976/876)

==== 900–999 ====
- Submarine Pipe-lines (Diving Operations) Regulations 1976 (SI 1976/923)
- Merchant Shipping (Registration of Submersible Craft) Regulations 1976 (SI 1976/940)
- Child Benefit (Residence and Persons Abroad) Regulations 1976 (SI 1976/963)
- Child Benefit (General) Regulations 1976 (SI 1976/965)
- Tendring Hundred Water Order 1976 (SI 1976/974)
- Borough of Spelthorne (Electoral Arrangements) Order 1976 (SI 1976/992)

=== 1000-1499 ===
==== 1000–1099 ====
- Borough of Glanford (Electoral Arrangements) Order 1976 (SI 1976/1001)
- Animals (Northern Ireland) Order 1976 (SI 1976/1040) (N.I. 13)
- Births and Deaths Registration (Northern Ireland) Order 1976 (SI 1976/1041) (N.I. 14)
- Sex Discrimination (Northern Ireland) Order 1976 (SI 1976/1042) (N.I. 15)
- Borough of Stockton-On-Tees (Electoral Arrangements) Order 1976 (SI 1976/1053)
- Borough of Cleethorpes (Electoral Arrangements) Order 1976 (SI 1976/1063)
- District of East Hampshire (Electoral Arrangements) Order 1976 (SI 1976/1064)
- Police (Scotland) Regulations 1976 (SI 1976/1073)
- Manchester Ship Canal (Black Bear Canal) (Local Enactments) Order 1976 (SI 1976/1084)
- District of Bassetlaw (Electoral Arrangements) Order 1976 (SI 1976/1095)

==== 1100–1199 ====
- Borough of Medway (Electoral Arrangements) Order 1976 (SI 1976/1130)
- Borough of Middlesbrough (Electoral Arrangements) Order 1976 (SI 1976/1131)
- Borough of North Warwickshire (Electoral Arrangements) Order 1976 (SI 1976/1132)

==== 1200–1299 ====
- Electrical Equipment (Safety) (Amendment) Regulations 1976 (SI 1976/1208)
- Financial Provisions (Northern Ireland) Order 1976 (SI 1976/1212) (N.I. 21)
- Pharmacy (Northern Ireland) Order 1976 (SI 1976/1213) (N.I. 22)
- Poisons (Northern Ireland) Order 1976 (SI 1976/1214) (N.I. 23)
- The District of Dacorum (Electoral Arrangements) Order 1976 (SI 1976/1238)
- Child Benefit and Social Security (Fixing and Adjustment of Rates) Regulations 1976 (SI 1976/1267)

==== 1300–1399 ====
- District of East Hertfordshire (Electoral Arrangements) Order 1976 (SI 1976/1303)
- Pensions Increase (Annual Review) Order 1976 (SI 1976/1356)

=== 1500-1999 ===
==== 1500–1599 ====
- Offshore Installations (Emergency Procedures) Regulations 1976 (SI 1976/1542)
- Borough of Barrow-in-Furness (Electoral Arrangements) Order 1976 (SI 1976/1545)
- Borough of Hyndburn (Electoral Arrangements) Order 1976 (SI 1976/1546)
- Borough of Blackburn (Electoral Arrangements) Order 1976 (SI 1976/1547)
- Borough of Stevenage (Electoral Arrangements) Order 1976 (SI 1976/1548)
- Borough of Rushmoor (Electoral Arrangements) Order 1976 (SI 1976/1549)
- Borough of Thurrock (Electoral Arrangements) Order 1976 (SI 1976/1550)
- Immigration (Variation of Leave) Order 1976 (SI 1976/1572)

==== 1600–1699 ====
- Industrial Training (Transfer of the Activities of Establishments) (No. 2) Order 1976 (SI 1976/1635)
- Motor Vehicles (Competitions and Trials) (Amendment) Regulations 1976 (SI 1976/1657)
- District of Bridgnorth (Electoral Arrangements) Order 1976 (SI 1976/1691)
- City of Canterbury (Electoral Arrangements) Order 1976 (SI 1976/1692)
- Borough of Medina (Electoral Arrangements) Order 1976 (SI 1976/1693)
- Borough of Scunthorpe (Electoral Arrangements) Order 1976 (SI 1976/1694)
- Borough of South Wight (Electoral Arrangements) Order 1976 (SI 1976/1695)

==== 1700–1799 ====
- District of Daventry (Electoral Arrangements) Order 1976 (SI 1976/1704)
- Police Pensions (Amendment) (No. 2) Regulations 1976 (SI 1976/1707)
- District of Malvern Hills (Electoral Arrangements) Order 1976 (SI 1976/1757)
- Child Benefit (Miscellaneous) (Minor Amendments) Regulations 1976 (SI 1976/1758)
- Borough of Maidstone (Electoral Arrangements) Order 1976 (SI 1976/1762)
- Borough of Reigate and Banstead (Electoral Arrangements) Order 1976 (SI 1976/1763)
- Secretary of State for Transport Order 1976 (SI 1976/1775)

==== 1800–1899 ====
- District of Chester-le-Street (Electoral Arrangements) Order 1976 (SI 1976/1819)
- City of Stoke-on-Trent (Electoral Arrangements) Order 1976 (SI 1976/1820)
- District of Tonbridge and Malling (Electoral Arrangements) Order 1976 (SI 1976/1876)
- Norman Cross—Grimsby Trunk Road (Diversion between London Road, Boston and Algarkirk) Order 1976 (SI 1976/1885)
- Restrictive Practices Court Rules 1976 (SI 1976/1897)

==== 1900–1999 ====
- Double Taxation Relief (Taxes on Income) (Spain) Order 1976 (SI 1976/1919)
- District of Sevenoaks (Electoral Arrangements) Order 1976 (SI 1976/1927)
- District of Babergh (Electoral Arrangements) Order 1976 (SI 1976/1965)
- District of South Derbyshire (Electoral Arrangements) Order 1976 (SI 1976/1966)
- City of Gloucester (Electoral Arrangements) Order 1976 (SI 1976/1967)
- City of York (Electoral Arrangements) Order 1976 (SI 1976/1968)
- District of Swale (Electoral Arrangements) Order 1976 (SI 1976/1974)
- Teachers' Superannuation Regulations 1976 (SI 1976/1987)

=== 2000-2499 ===
==== 2000–2099 ====
- Fire Certificates (Special Premises) Regulations 1976 (SI 1976/2003)
- Fire Precautions Act 1971 (Modifications) Regulations 1976 (SI 1976/2007)
- Fire Precautions (Application for Certificate) Regulations 1976 (SI 1976/2008)
- Fire Precautions (Factories, Offices, Shops and Railway Premises) Order 1976 (SI 1976/2009)
- Fire Precautions (Non-Certificated Factory, Office, Shop and Railway Premises) Regulations 1976 (SI 1976/2010)
- Motor Vehicles (Competitions and Trials) (Scotland) Regulations 1976 (SI 1976/2019)
- Representation of the People Act 1969 (Commencement No. 3) Order 1976 (SI 1976/2064)
- Parish and Community Meetings (Polls) (Amendment) Rules 1976 (SI 1976/2067)
- Borough of Gillingham (Electoral Arrangements) Order 1976 (SI 1976/2069)

==== 2100–2199 ====
- Industrial Training (Transfer of the Activities of Establishments) (No. 3) Order 1976 (SI 1976/2110)
- City of Southampton (Electoral Arrangements) Order 1976 (SI 1976/2169)

==== 2200–2299 ====
- County Court Funds (Amendment) Rules 1976 (SI 1976/2234)
- Supreme Court Funds (Amendment) Rules 1976 (Note: In 1976, the Supreme Court comprised the High Court and the Court of Appeal.) (SI 1976/2235)

== See also ==
- List of statutory instruments of the United Kingdom
