= Competition Act 1998 =

Act of the Parliament of the United Kingdom

Competition Act 1998 (Note: Section 76(1).)
- Act of Parliament
- Parliament of the United Kingdom
- Long title: An Act to make provision about competition and the abuse of a dominant position in the market; to confer powers in relation to investigations conducted in connection with Article 85 or 86 of the treaty establishing the European Community; to amend the Fair Trading Act 1973 in relation to information which may be required in connection with investigations under that Act; to make provision with respect to the meaning of "supply of services" in the Fair Trading Act 1973; and for connected purposes.
- Citation: 1998 c. 41
- Introduced by: Margaret Beckett, President of the Board of Trade (Commons)
- Territorial extent: United Kingdom (Note: Section 76(4).)

Dates
- Royal assent: 9 November 1998
- Commencement: Various (Note: Section 76(2)–(3).)
Other legislation
Amends	Fair Trading Act 1973; Energy Act 1976; Road Traffic (Consequential Provisions) Act 1988; Water Industry Act 1991; Water Resources Act 1991; Coal Industry Act 1994
Amended by	Postal Services Act 2011; Digital Markets, Competition and Consumers Act 2024

Status: Amended

Text of statute as originally enacted

Revised text of statute as amended

The Competition Act 1998 (c. 41) is an act of the Parliament of the United Kingdom. The act is the current major source of competition law in the United Kingdom, along with the Enterprise Act 2002. The act provides an updated framework for identifying and dealing with restrictive business practices and abuse of a dominant market position.

One of the main purposes of this act was to harmonise the UK with EU competition policy, with Chapter I and II of the act mirroring the content of articles 81 and 82 of the Treaty of Amsterdam (formally articles 85 and 86 of the Treaty of Rome). (Note: Since these two main provisions on EU competition law (articles 81 and 82) were treaty articles and thus inevitably binding on member states, it is curious then that the UK Government chose to replicate the EU Treaty provisions into a UK statute. Both EU treaty articles and EU Regulations require no further legislative implementation by member states.) (Note: Articles 81 ad 82 have since been renumbered as articles 101 and 102.)

== Chapter I Agreements ==
Deals with restrictive practices engaged by companies operating within the UK that distort, restrict or prevent competition. These are, primarily in the form of horizontal agreements (agreements to collude between firms on the same level of the supply chain such as retailers or wholesalers). These agreements could be to limit output, collusively share information, fix prices, tender collectively and share markets out.

The Competition and Markets Authority (CMA) is responsible for prosecuting such firms who engage in these activities, and are able to levy fines up to 10% of annual global turnover for every year in which a violation has taken place up to a maximum of three years.

Exemptions from prohibition are available if the firm can demonstrate that these practices are in the interest of the consumer through increasing market efficiencies or advancing technical progress.

== Chapter II Abuse of Dominant Position ==
Chapter II deals with the abuse of a dominant position by a firm who uses practices such as predatory pricing, excessive prices, refusal to supply, vertical restraints and price discrimination to maximise profit, gain competitive advantage or otherwise restrict competition.

In investigating alleged breaches of Chapter II a two-stage process is involved. Firstly it must be identified if the firm possesses a dominant market position. This can be done through various concentration indices such as the Herfindahl-Hirchman Index (HHI). Generally, if a firm is found to have a market share over 40% then it is considered a threat to competition.

There are no exemptions to Chapter II as by its very definition as "abuse" of a market position, one must be guilty of wrongdoing for the chapter to apply.

An example of the effects of the act is that in 2004, public schools were investigated for fee-fixing by the Office of Fair Trading, and in 2005 fifty of the leading schools (including Ampleforth, Eton, Charterhouse, Gresham's, Harrow, Haileybury, Marlborough, Rugby, Sevenoaks, Shrewsbury, Stowe, Wellington and Winchester) were ordered to raise £3 million between them to be spent on charities nominated by the pupils of the schools involved in the years 2001–2003, and they were also banned from sharing information on their external fees.
