= Worksop Waterworks Company =

Water company in England

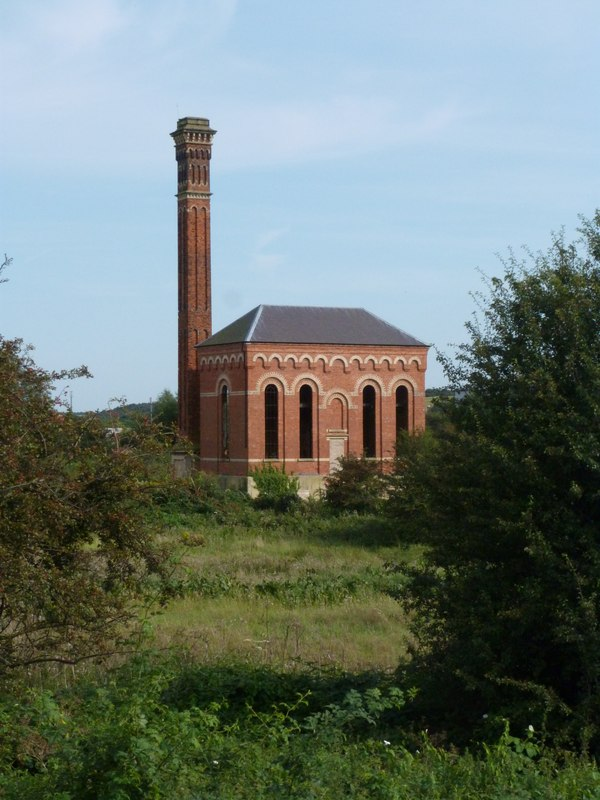
- Bracebridge pumping station pumped sewage to Kilton Forest Farm from 1881.
- Industry: Water and sewage
- Founded: 1875
- Defunct: 1910
- Fate: Taken over
- Successor: Worksop Urban District Council
- Headquarters: Worksop, Nottinghamshire, England
- Key people: Robert Rawlinson, John Allsopp

Worksop Waterworks Company, its predecessors and successors have provided a public water supply, together with sewerage and sewage treatment facilities to the town of Worksop since the mid-19th century. Unlike many towns, the sewerage network was constructed before the water supply network, and there was official opposition to the idea of providing a water supply network.

== History ==
Britain in the 1830s and 1840s faced a time of considerable political upheaval. The passing of the Reform Act 1832 (2 & 3 Will. 4. c. 45) had begun the process of giving votes to at least part of the population, while the Municipal Corporations Act 1835 (5 & 6 Will. 4. c. 76) had replaced self-perpetuating corporations in towns and cities with democratically elected councils. Following a serious outbreak of typhus in 1838, the reformer Edwin Chadwick had spent three years compiling his report on The Sanitary Conditions of the Labouring Classes in Britain in 1842, which had caught the public imagination, and became an unexpected best-seller for Her Majesty's Stationery Office. The Health of Towns Commission was set up in the wake of this, while Chadwick campaigned vigorously for a system where every house would have a constant water supply and adequate sewerage. He was convinced that the introduction of water closets only made matters worse if they resulted in cesspools overflowing, rather than the waste being carried away to be treated elsewhere.

In 1847, Lord Morpeth had introduced a bill to Parliament, which would have required all town councils and town commissioners to ensure that every house had a water supply, and that issues of drainage, sewerage and street paving were addressed. There was opposition to the proposals, and by the time it became the Public Health Act 1848 (11 & 12 Vict. c. 63), many of its key proposals had been diluted. Nevertheless, it created a Central Board of Health, and the powers required to implement water and sewerage schemes could be obtained by a town requesting that an inspector from the board carried out a survey, rather than requiring a local act of Parliament, which was a much more costly exercise. The process was still not straightforward, as there were disagreements between men such as Chadwick who advocated glazed pipes for the sewers, and engineers such as Thomas Hawksley who advocated brick-built sewers, and there was no real agreement on what to do with the sewage once the pipework had been installed. Water supply produced a product which could be sold to households, and so private enterprise could finance many of the initial schemes, but sewerage did not produce anything that had a similar saleable value. Local authorities therefore had to fund the works themselves, and rates were generally not sufficient to fund such capital work.

Under the terms of the Public Health Act 1848, local boards of health could be created in towns or villages where the death rate exceeded 23 per thousand, or where more than one tenth of the population requested a board. Worksop's death rate was 26.6 per thousand in 1847, and a petition signed by the required number of inhabitants was sent to the Central Board of Health. However, a number of prominent people within the town felt that such a board was unnecessary, and submitted a counter proposal. This objection did not stop William Lee visiting the town on behalf of the board to prepare a report. He arrived on 3 July 1850, and his report stated that there was no public water supply, no drainage system, unpaved streets, the town was uncleansed, there were many dilapidated privies with open cesspools, and some housing suffered from bad ventilation and overcrowding. Despite these findings, it was another two years before elections took place for the local board of health, when nine of the 29 candidates standing for positions were elected on 5 August 1852. The nine consisted of the Duke of Newcastle and eight prominent tradesmen. There were some difficulties in the early years, with members unused to the idea of ordered debate, and the financial position proving to be confused. The clerks resigned on 8 December 1856, citing "ungentlemanly conduct" by other members of the board, and in 1857 a petition was submitted requesting that the board be disbanded.

=== Sewage disposal ===
Joseph Garside, a local entrepreneur who owned a large wood yard in the town and subsequently ran the Worksop and Retford Brewery Company, had stood for the board initially, but failed to get elected. However, he had more success in 1856, and became its chairman in 1857, a position which he held for 19 years. Like many towns, the poorer areas of Worksop were often affected by outbreaks of cholera, typhus and typhoid, and under Garside's leadership, construction of a main drainage scheme for the town began in 1859. The engineer was Robert Rawlinson, whose report on sewerage schemes in several towns, including Worksop, was presented to the Society of Arts in 1862, and published in The Engineer. The details of the scheme are presented in two tables, but it is not clear why they differ so much. Both show that there were some sewers constructed of brick, and much longer lengths constructed using earthenware pipes of 15 inches (38 cm), 12 inches (30 cm) and 9 inches (23 cm) diameter. Cast iron pipes of the same sizes were used where the sewers had to cross the Chesterfield Canal, the River Ryton, and the canal feeder. The main brick sewer ran from Bridge Street to Beaver Place, and was of egg-shaped construction, with an overflow to the River Ryton where it ended, and the earthenware pipes to the outlet works began. The system included 75 manholes and 48 lampholes, to allow the sewers to be inspected, together with 51 ventilating shafts. The upper ends of the sewers were provided with flushing tanks, and the outlet works consisted of six trenches, about 200 feet (61 m) long and 3 feet (0.91 m) deep, where lime water was added for disinfection and moveable screens removed solid matter. The filtered sewage was then discharged into the Ryton, and although Rawlinson believed that the works were efficient, he suggested that the liquid would be better filtered by applying it to vegetable soil under full cultivation. His two tables show that the total length of sewers was 12,249 yards (11,200 m) or 6,263 yards (5,727 m), and that installation costs were £5,871 or £3,107.

Despite Rawlinson's assurances, the scheme was not wholly successful, and the inadequacy of the outlet works was brought into focus by new legislation to prevent the discharge of sewage into rivers, following the findings of the River Pollution Commission. The issue was resolved on 19 August 1881, when a new pumping station at Bracebridge was switched on, to pump the effluent to Kilton Forest Farm, owned by Mr F. J. S. Foljambe of Osberton, where it was discharged onto the fields. The cost of the scheme was nearly double the original estimate of £8,000. The engine house, offices and a house for the attendant cost £7,000, another £4,500 was spent on the engines, boilers and pumps, while repairs to the existing system and the new pipeline to Kilton cost £3,500. The revised scheme, including the design of the Italianate pumping station, was the responsibility of the local board of health's surveyor, John Allsopp. The engine house contained two beam engines, connected to double-acting pumps. They were manufactured by Joseph Clayton of Preston, and were rated at 40 hp (30 kW). Each could pump 0.8 million imperial gallons (3.6 Ml) per day along the 1.25-mile (2.0 km) pipeline to Kilton, around twice the volume actually required at the time.

At the opening ceremony, John Mapson, the chairman of the board of health, and John Thornton each started one of the engines. They were then stopped for Mapson to address the gathering. To express their gratitude that the scheme had been completed, he invited all the workmen who had worked on the scheme to dinner at the Golden Ball on the following Monday. The party then went to Kilton Farm, but arrived before the sewage started to discharge, and because the weather was inclement, left straight away. By the time the new works were completed, Worksop had borrowed £37,000 to fund improvements to the town, and most of it had been spent on the sewerage system. Bracebridge pumping station, together with its chimney, is now a grade II listed structure. It was built in the Italian Romanesque style, of red bricks and ashlar with dressings of gault and blue brick, and a hipped slate roof. Allsopp became the engineer and surveyor for the board in 1876, having previously worked on the Settle and Carlisle Railway, the Duffield and Selston branch of the Midland Railway, and then for four years on drainage and sewerage projects. He resigned from the board in 1884, to follow a career as a freelance architect and surveyor.

=== Development ===
By 1932, the pumping station had been operating for over 50 years, without any major issues. However, the amount of effluent being pumped each day had risen from 200,000 imperial gallons (0.91 Ml) to 700,000 imperial gallons (3.2 Ml), and while the pumps could easily handle this volume, being capable of dealing with twice that amount, the council were concerned that failure of the pumps would lead to severe pollution of the Ryton. In addition, the receiving tanks at the pumping station were not really deep enough, resulting in sewage backing up in the sewers. Finally, because the hours when pumping was allowed were restricted, the tanks would often be overflowing into the river by the morning, particularly if there was rainfall during the night. This had resulted in complaints being made by the Notts County Health Department and the Trent Fishery Board. The council met in December 1932 to consider two schemes, one to refurbish the pumping station, and the other for an extension of the main drain to a site near Manton railway viaduct, where a new pumping station would be constructed. Although the cost of this option was £45,596, almost five times the cost of refurbishment, the council voted for the more costly scheme, as it would enable land to the east of the current site to be developed, without having to pump sewage back to Bracebridge.

In November 1962, Charles Allsopp, the borough engineer, delivered a lengthy paper to the council's Health and Sewerage Committee, which was printed in full in the local newspaper in early 1963, by which time Allsopp had retired. Some minor changes had been made to the original scheme, to make the removal of sludge and screenings easier, and in 1939, the steam-driven pumps had been replaced by vertical spindle pumps, driven by electric motors. The 1932 scheme for a new pumping station had not gone ahead, because although approval had been sought from the Ministry of Health, a "Worksop Industrial Scheme" was proposed, which might have seen the population of the town increase to 100,000 in under five years. The pumping station scheme was deferred until the uncertainty could be resolved, and the onset of the Second World War brought further delays. Post-war shortages prevented any progress, and the system continued to serve the needs of the town. There were some difficulties, caused by the inability of the farmer to cope with the steadily increasing volumes of liquid pumped to the farm. This was allowed to flow into Thievesdale Lane, where it created a hazard, and small quantities of zinc and nickel in the effluent, derived from talcum powder, oxidation of water tanks, and industrial discharges, were thought to be responsible for crop failures at the sewage farm.

Allsopp thought the difficulties could be partially mitigated by extending the pumping main northwards to Carlton Forest Farm, where 234 acres (95 ha) of land could be used for broad irrigation, in addition to the 400 acres (160 ha) at Kilton Forest Farm. It might then have been possible to extend the hours during which pumping was allowed, but he could not see a simple solution to the presence of zinc and nickel, and thought that broad irrigation might have to be abandoned soon, to be replaced by treatment at a sewage works. He estimated the cost of such a works to be around £350,000. By 1957, the daily flow pumped to the sewage farm had risen to 1.3 million imperial gallons (5.9 Ml), and ministerial approval was again sought for a replacement pumping station at Manton viaduct. At a similar time, the spindle pumps were replaced by submersible pumps in the collecting tanks, making the 1881 buildings redundant.

=== New administration ===
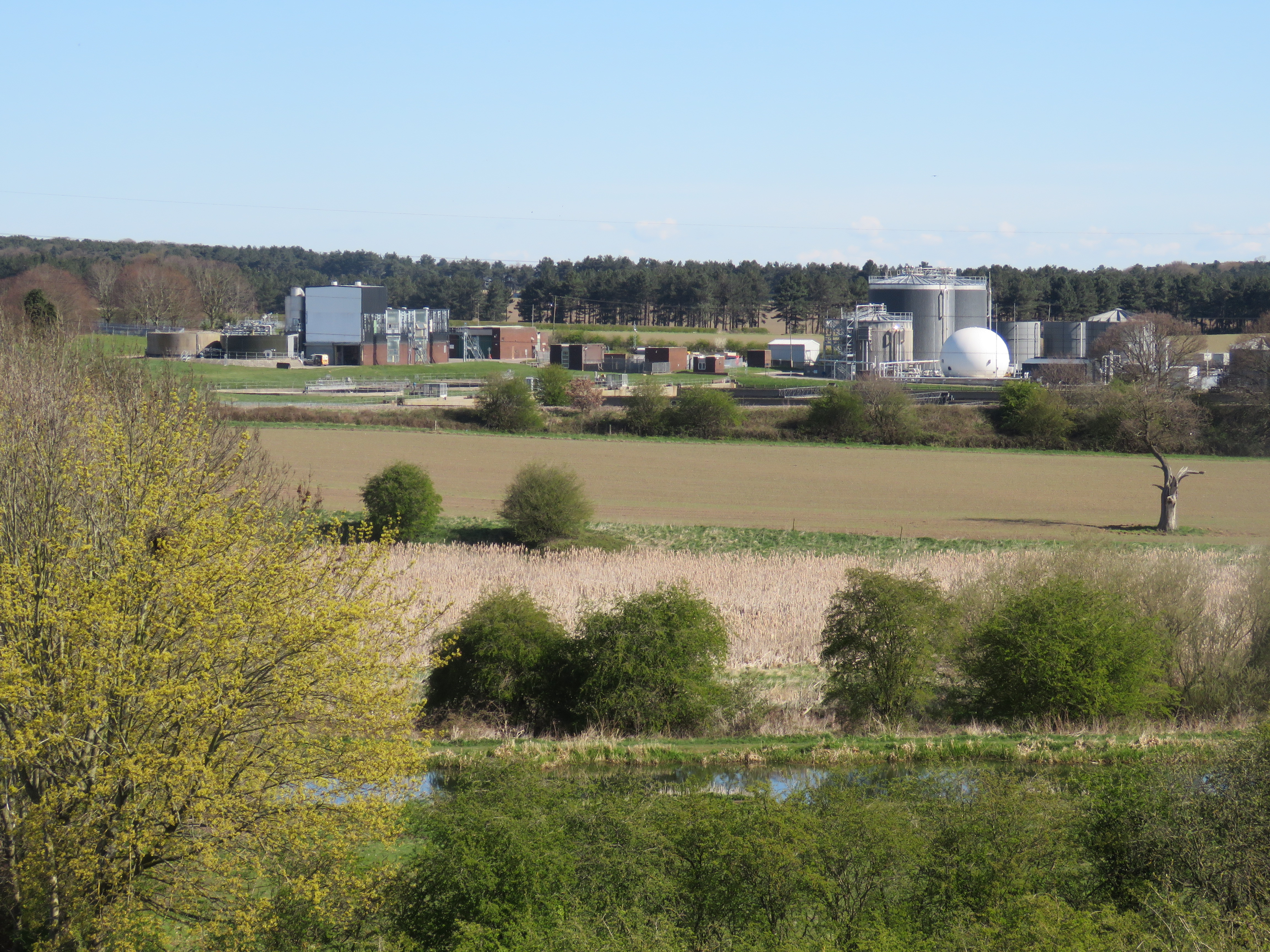
The modern Worksop Sewage Works, seen from the south. The sludge treatment facility is to the right.

Significant change occurred on 1 April 1974, when the Water Act 1973 came into force. Nearly 1,400 sewage treatment authorities in England and Wales were removed from local authority control, and their function became the responsibility of one of ten new water authorities. In Worksop's case this was the Severn Trent Water Authority. Assets transferred included all main sewers, treatment works, and outfalls. The new authorities also took over the responsibilities of most of the existing water supply authorities, as well as the 29 river authorities established under the Water Resources Act 1963. Within two years, Worksop gained a new sewage treatment works, costing £1.5 million, and suitable for a population of 60,000 people.

A new sludge treatment facility was built at the sewage works in the 2010s. Sludge from Worksop sewage works and several other sewage works in the locality was transported by road to Stoke Bardolph, where it was used to generate energy. In order to reduce the number of trips by tankers carrying the sludge, Worksop was chosen as a central location for Severn Trent's northern area, and therefore the site for the new facility, which cost £15 million. To reach the site, lorries had to pass through a residential area, and a new access road was constructed as part of the project to avoid this. The road crossed the Chesterfield Canal by a single span concrete bridge, which was clad with masonry to make it look more traditional, and had to avoid damaging an area to the south of the canal which provides habitat for water voles. It also crossed the River Ryton using a four-span viaduct, with each span being 59 feet (18 m) long. The sludge treatment plant consists of an acid phase digester, which pre-treats the sludge to allow the two downstream gas phase digesters to break down the sludge more completely. The plant can process 450 cubic metres of sludge per day, and the gas produced is used to generate power. The new facility is designed to handle a maximum of 10,209 tonnes of dry solids per year, 80 per cent of which is delivered to the site by road tankers. It was designed and constructed by the civil engineers Mott MacDonald Bentley, with commissioning taking place during the winter of 2014/2015.

== Water supply ==
Worksop Waterworks Act 1875 (Note: Section 1.)
- Act of Parliament
- Parliament of the United Kingdom
- Long title: An Act for better supplying with Water the Parish of Worksop, in the County of Nottingham; and for other purposes.
- Citation: 38 & 39 Vict. c. lxiii
- Territorial extent: United Kingdom

Dates
- Royal assent: 14 June 1875
- Commencement: 14 June 1875 (Note: The Acts of Parliament (Commencement) Act 1793.)

Other legislation
- Amended by: Statute Law (Repeals) Act 1995

Status: Amended

Text of statute as originally enacted

In the 19th century, drinking water was obtained from wells, pumps, rainwater butts and the canal. In the poorer parts of the town it was contaminated. A government inspector, visiting the town in 1853, wrote that "The water supply and drainage are of the most wretched description, and manure heaps, piggeries, foul privies and stagnant filth flourish in the vicinity of the houses. The accumulated filth percolates to the wells and pollutes the water which people drink." However, when the townspeople agitated for a clean water supply and presented a bill to Parliament, Garside opposed it, stating at a public meeting on 11 March 1875, "I am a large owner of property, and I would not allow any of my tenants to suffer in health for want of good water." He believed that there was plenty of good water available, and that all landlords should and would follow his example. He was worried that a private company would not be viable, and that the board would not be able to bail it out if it failed, due to their commitment to the sewerage scheme. The meeting voted to oppose the waterworks bill, but supporters of it pushed for a poll of the ratepayers. Garside agreed for that to take place, and it showed that two-thirds of the voters supported the waterworks scheme. Garside immediately resigned his post as chairman and a member of the local board of health, and the waterworks scheme was duly authorised by the Worksop Waterworks Act 1875 (38 & 39 Vict. c. lxiii).

One of the highest points in Worksop was located to the east of Sunnyside, and it was there that construction of the works began on 14 August 1877. The first sod was cut by Miss Charlotte Crofts White, after which around 60 people had lunch at the Lion Hotel. The engineer for the project was Josiah Foster Fairbank, and he oversaw the construction of a well which was 370 feet (110 m) deep, from which water was raised by a steam pump. A water tower was constructed, but was short-lived, and was replaced by an underground reservoir soon afterwards. The main reservoir was 150 feet (46 m) long, 100 feet (30 m) wide, and 12 feet (3.7 m) deep, with a capacity of 1 million imperial gallons (4.5 Ml). Access to the site was provided by a road running parallel to Sunnyside, which subsequently became Beech Avenue. A house for the manager called Oakholme was built soon after the formal opening of the works. The cost of the project was less than the estimated £14,000, and was covered by the provisions of their enabling act, which allowed them to raise £12,000 in shares and an additional £3,000 if required.

The Worksop Waterworks Company began supplying the town in 1878, with John Allsopp becoming its first engineer. The official opening took place on 5 September, when visitors spent some time inspecting the reservoir, the engine house and the machinery. William Allen, the chairman of the company, introduced Fairbank, who stated that they had laid 15,000 yards (14,000 m) of water mains within the town, and that although the works had the capacity to supply 30,000 people, only a small number of houses were so far connected to the system. He also hoped that the Board of Health would fund the provision of hydrants, to aid the fighting of fires. The party then saw two hydrants being tested, one on Bridge Street and another at the Manton Inn, before visiting a new drinking fountain at the Corn Exchange, which the company had donated to the town. The festivities were followed by lunch at the Lion Hotel. Uptake of the new facility was slow but steady, and by 1890, most of the houses in the town had a permanent water supply, although a few still relied on pumps or wells.

Work began on sinking Manton Colliery in 1898, on land owned by Henry Pelham-Clinton, 7th Duke of Newcastle and it was fully operational by 1907. It had been started by the Wigan Coal and Iron Company, who signed a formal agreement on 24 March 1909 to supply water pumped from the colliery to the Worksop Waterworks Company. Water was stored in an underground reservoir at the pit, before it was pumped to the waterworks. Although he gives no dates, Bradley records that some 4 million imperial gallons (18 Ml) per day were pumped up Manton's No1 shaft, of which half was used for drinking water, with the other half used to augment levels in the River Ryton.

The 1875 act had given the water company powers to sell the works, and had also authorised the Worksop Local Board of Health to buy them, as and when it was appropriate. The company had obtained additional powers in 1888 and 1902, both orders allowing them to raise more capital to fund their projects, and they obtained the Worksop Water Act 1909 (9 Edw. 7. c. xxvi), to authorise further work. This act formalised the options for selling the undertaking, requiring the introduction of a bill during the next parliamentary session. The local board of health had been replaced by an urban district council in 1894, and the takeover of the waterworks was authorised by the Worksop Urban District Council Act 1910 (10 Edw. 7 & 1 Geo. 5. c. xl). By that time, the value of the asset had risen, and the council paid £64,612 to buy the water company in 1911.

The waterworks then passed to the South Derbyshire Water Board in 1961, and in 1974 to the new Severn Trent Water Authority.

== Bibliography ==
- Allsopp, Charles (11 January 1963). "Sewage Disposal in Worksop". Worksop Guardian.
- Allsopp, Richard (25 April 2003). "Chronological History of Bracebridge Pumping Station". Letter from author to Prince's Foundation. Unpublished.
- Binnie, G M (1981). Early Victorian Water Engineers. Thomas Telford. ISBN 978-0-7277-0128-2.
- Bradley, Robert (2015). "My History of Mining". healeyhero.co.uk. Archived from the original on 14 June 2015.
- Jackson, Michael J (1979). Worksop in Times Past. Countryside Publications. ISBN 978-0-86157-023-2.
- Jackson, Michael J (1992). Victorian Worksop. Worksop Archaeological and Local History Society. ISBN 978-0-9501203-1-7.
- Jackson, Michael J (2005). Bygone Worksop. Worksop Archaeological and Local History Society. ISBN 978-0-9501203-2-4.
- Mills, Dennis R (2015). Effluence and Influence – Public Health, Sewers and Politics in Lincoln, 1848–50. Society for Lincolnshire History and Archaeology. ISBN 978-0-903582-53-7.
- Moon, Peter; Clark, Dave (2015). "Worksop STW - Northern Area Sludge" (PDF). Water Projects Online. Archived (PDF) from the original on 13 April 2021.
- "Sewage site work planned". Lincolnshire World. 1 December 2011. Archived from the original on 12 May 2022.
- Porter, Elizabeth (1978). Water management in England and Wales. Cambridge University Press. ISBN 978-0-521-10561-3.
- Rawlinson, Robert (4 April 1862). "On the sewering of towns and the draining of houses". The Engineer. Morgan-Grampian (Publishers).
- Staff writer (9 December 1932). "Worksop Town Council. Drainage Scheme to cost £45,000". Worksop Guardian.
- Wain, Ken (2014). The Coal Mining Industry of Barnsley, Rotherham and Worksop. Amberley Publishing. ISBN 978-1-4456-3965-9.
