= Veolia (disambiguation) =

- Veolia Environnement
- Veolia Transport
  - Veolia Transport NSW, now Transdev NSW in Australia
  - Veolia Transport Perth, now Transdev WA in Australia
  - Veolia Transport Queensland, now Transdev Queensland in Australia
  - Veolia Transport Brisbane, now Transdev Brisbane Ferries in Australia
  - Veolia Transport Norge, now Boreal Norge in Norway
  - Veolia Transport Cymru, later Crossgates Coaches in Wales
  - Veolia Verkehr, now Transdev Germany in Germany, Verkehr ~ transport in German
  - Veolia Transport Auckland, now Transdev Auckland in New Zealand
  - Veolia Cargo, sold to Eurotunnel
  - Veolia Transport Nederland, in the Netherlands
  - Veolia Transdev, now Transdev
- Veolia Water
  - Veolia Water UK
    - Veolia Water Central
    - Veolia Water Southeast
    - Veolia Water East
