= Ardleigh Reservoir =

Reservoir in Essex, England

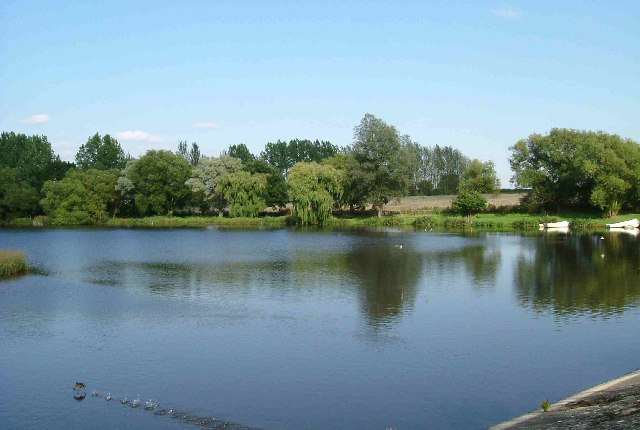

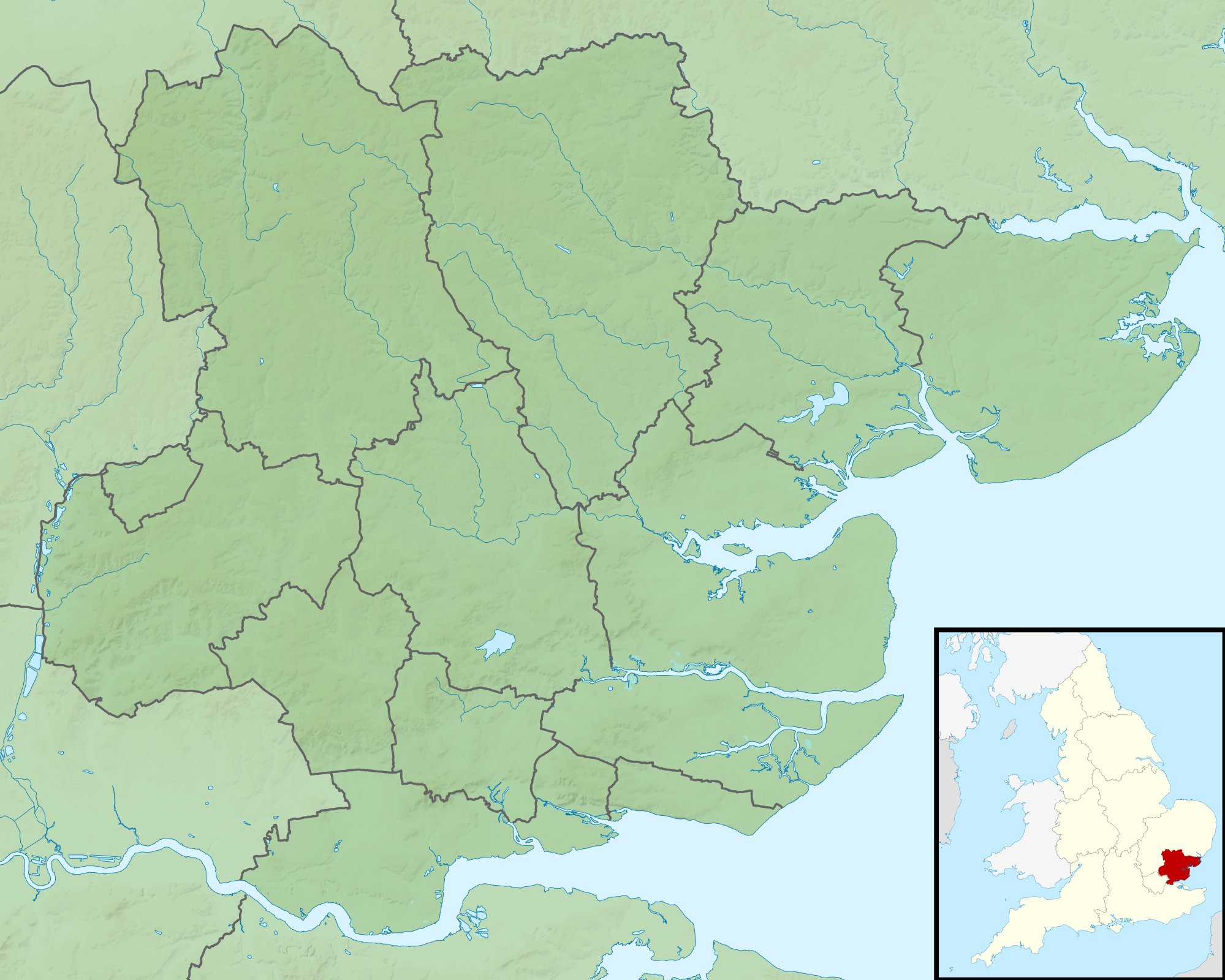
- Location within Essex
- Location: Essex, England
- Coordinates: 51°54′55″N 0°57′20″E
- Type: Artificial lake reservoir
- Primary inflows: West Salary Brook, North Salary Brook, River Colne
- Primary outflows: Ardleigh water treatment works, Salary Brook
- Catchment area: 1,187 hectares (2,930 acres)
- Basin countries: United Kingdom
- Built: 1971
- Surface area: 49 hectares (120 acres)
- Average depth: 4.158 metres (13.64 ft)
- Water volume: 2.2 million cubic metres (78×10^{6} cu ft)
- Surface elevation: 34 metres (112 ft)

Ardleigh Reservoir is a 49-hectare (120-acre) lake near Colchester in Essex, England constructed in the valley of the Salary Brook. It supplies water both to Anglian Water and to Affinity Water. The lake is also used for recreational activities including sailing and angling.

== History ==
The South Essex Waterworks Company, the Southend Waterworks Company and several other water undertakings in Essex sought powers in 1969 to increase the security of the supply of drinking water. A draft Water Order was made and a public inquiry was held in December 1969.

The Essex River and South Essex Water Act 1969 received Royal Assent on 25 July 1969. Under the terms of the Act the Essex River Authority constructed the Cattawade Barrage Works to prevent salt water entering the lower reaches of the River Stour. The South Essex Waterworks Company built a water intake upstream of the barrage, a pumping station at Brantham, and a pipeline to the new Ardleigh reservoir.

The South Essex Waterworks Company and the Southend Waterworks Company merged to form the Essex Water Company in 1970.

== Operation ==
The reservoir is operated by the Ardleigh Reservoir Committee which is owned jointly by Affinity Water (formerly Veolia Water East) and Anglian Water.

The reservoir receives large volumes of water from the East Mills intake (51°53'28.8"N 0°54'54.8"E) on the River Colne and the Northern and Western Salary Brooks in the direct reservoir catchment of about 12 km^{2}. The River Colne's catchment area is approximately 256 km^{2}.

The associated Ardleigh water treatment works (51°54'59.3"N 0°57'43.3"E), treats and supplies 14 million litres per day of drinking water to 133,000 customers. The treatment plant has included Dissolved Air Flotation (DAF), Granular Activated Carbon (GAC) filters, ozone dosing, Rapid Gravity Filters (RGF) and Actiflo technology. The peak output of Ardleigh treatment works is 36 million litres per day (2018).

In 2011 SRC Aggregates planned to remove 4 million tonnes of gravel from a site adjacent to the Ardleigh reservoir to eventually create a new reservoir of 1.8 million cubic metres (64×10^{6} cu ft) capacity. Gravel extraction was thought to take 15 years.

== Recreation ==
Both game and coarse fish are present including pike and zander.

Ardleigh Reservoir is also home to the University of Essex Rowing Club.
