= Thames Water Authority =

Water authority in England (1974–1989)

Authority overview
- Formed: 1 April 1974
- Preceding agencies: Metropolitan Water Board; Numerous smaller water undertakers & river conservancies
- Dissolved: 1989
- Superseding agencies: Thames Water; National Rivers Authority

The Thames Water Authority was a UK regional water authority created by the Water Act 1973 to consolidate water management in the river Thames catchment area. It was dissolved in 1989 due to the privatisation of the water industry.

== Predecessors ==
The bodies subsumed by the Thames Water Authority included the Metropolitan Water Board, the Thames Conservancy, the Lee Conservancy Catchment Board and parts of the Essex and Kent River authorities. It also took over water and sewage responsibility from the following public water suppliers in the Thames catchment:

- Cotswold Water Board
- Croydon Corporation
- Epsom and Ewell Corporation
- Middle Thames Water Board
- Oxfordshire and District Water Board
- Swindon Corporation
- Thames Valley Water Board
- Watford Corporation
- West Surrey Water Board

The following private statutory water suppliers operated within its region, and in their operating areas Thames Water Authority provided sewage services only:

- Colne Valley Water Company
- East Surrey Water Company
- Lee Valley Water Company
- Mid Southern Water Company
- Rickmansworth and Uxbridge Valley Water Company
- South West Suburban Water Company
- Sutton District Water Company
- Woking and District Water Company

Colne Valley Water, Lee Valley Water and Rickmansworth and Uxbridge Valley Water merged in 1994 to form Three Valleys Water.

=== Epsom and Ewell Corporation Waterworks ===
The Epsom undertaking was established in 1853, when Epsom was governed by a local board of health.

Epsom and Ewell Urban District Council was created in 1933, becoming Epsom and Ewell Corporation in 1937.

=== Swindon Corporation Waterworks ===
The Swindon Waterworks Company was acquired by the local boards of Old Swindon and Swindon New Town by the Swindon Water Act 1894 (57 & 58 Vict. c. clxxxi), and vested in Swindon Water Board. The two districts were merged in 1900 into Swindon Municipal Borough, creating Swindon Corporation Waterworks.

=== Cotswold Water Board ===
Cotswold Water Board was created by the Cotswold Water Board Order 1961 (SI 1961/187).

Cirencester Urban District Council had purchased the undertaking of the Cirencester Waterworks Company under the Cirencester Water Act 1897 (60 & 61 Vict. c. clxxx).

The Cirencester Waterworks Company was formed in 1882, and obtained authority to supply water in the Cirencester Water Order 1891.

=== Metropolitan Water Board ===
The Metropolitan Water Board was created by the Metropolis Water Act 1902 (2 Edw. 7. c. 41) to take over the eight existing private water companies supplying London, together with the water undertakings of the urban district councils of Enfield and Tottenham.

=== Middle Thames Water Board ===
The Middle Thames Water Board was formed by the Middle Thames Water Board Order 1966 (SI 1964/1673), taking over Slough Corporation Waterworks and the Burnham, Dorney and Hitcham Waterworks Company.

Slough Urban District Council purchased the undertaking of the Slough Waterworks Company under the Slough Urban District Water Act 1911 (1 & 2 Geo. 5. c. xx). Slough became a municipal borough in 1938 and Slough Urban District Council became Slough Corporation.

The Slough Waterworks Company was incorporated by the Slough Waterworks Act 1868 (31 & 32 Vict. c. xxviii).

The Burnham, Dorney and Hitcham Waterworks Company had been founded in 1891 and was authorised to supply water by the Burnham and District Water Order 1896.

=== Oxfordshire and District Water Board ===
The Oxfordshire and District Water Board was formed by the Oxfordshire and District Water Board Order 1966 (SI 1966/1163), taking over Oxford Corporation Waterworks.

The Oxford Corporation Waterworks had existing on a non-statutory basis for over 60 years when they were formalised by the Oxford (Corporation) Waterworks Act 1875 (38 & 39 Vict. c. xli).

=== Thames Valley Water Board ===
The Thames Valley Water Board was created in 1959.

=== West Surrey Water Board ===
The Guildford, Godalming and District Water Board was constituted by the Guildford, Godalming and District Water Board Order 1952 (SI 1952/1703), taking over the Guildford Corporation Waterworks. It was renamed to the West Surrey Water Board by the West Surrey Water Board Order 1966 (SI 1966/538).

The Guildford Corporation Waterworks was created by the purchase of the private Guildford Waterworks Company in 1865-1866.

The Guildford Waterworks Company was incorporated by the Guildford Water Act 1857 (20 & 21 Vict. c. iv).

== Dissolution ==
In 1989 the Thames Water Authority was partly privatised, under the provisions of the Water Act 1989 with the water and sewage responsibilities transferring to the newly established publicly quoted company of Thames Water, and the regulatory, land drainage and navigation responsibilities transferring to the newly created National Rivers Authority which later became the Environment Agency.
