= North West Water =

English water company

North West Water plc
- Final logo of North West Water (1995)
- Predecessor: North West Water Authority
- Founded: 1989; 37 years ago
- Defunct: 1995

North West Water was a water supply, sewage disposal and sewage treatment company serving North West England. It was established as the North West Water Authority in 1973, and became North West Water plc in 1989, as part of the privatisation of the water industry in England and Wales. In 1995, it merged with NORWEB (the former North Western Electricity Board) to form United Utilities.

== North West Water Authority ==
The North West Water Authority was one of ten regional authorities created by the Water Act 1973. It was formed from the merger of statutory water undertakings, local sewerage boards and three river authorities, these being the Mersey and Weaver River Authority, the Lancashire River Authority and the Cumberland River Authority.

The water undertakings subsumed into North West Water authority by the North West Water Authority Constitution Order 1973 (SI 1973/1287) included:

=== Municipal corporations ===
- Bolton Corporation Waterworks
- Carlisle Corporation Waterworks
- Liverpool Corporation Waterworks
- Manchester Corporation Waterworks
- St. Helens Corporation Waterworks
- Widnes Corporation Waterworks

=== Water boards ===
- Calder Water Board
- Eden Water Board
- Furness Water Board
- Fylde Water Board
- Lakes and Lune Water Board
- Lune Valley Water Board
- Macclesfield District Water Board
- Makerfield Water Board
- Mid Cheshire Water Board
- North Calder Water Board
- Preston and District Water Board
- South Cumberland Water Board
- Stockport and District Water Board
- Warrington, Runcorn and District Water Board
- West Cumberland Water Board
- West Lancashire Water Board
- West Pennine Water Board
- Wirral Water Board

The sewage treatment, sewerage and water supply and distribution arms of the authority were privatised in July 1989, becoming North West Water plc. The remaining regulatory functions of the authority, including pollution prevention, fisheries management, flood control, water resource management and a number of other ancillary functions, were transferred to the newly formed National Rivers Authority.

The water supply sewage disposal and sewerage assets, which were previously held by the water authority and covered some 56,000 hectares (220 sq miles), were transferred to North West Water at privatisation.

=== Predecessors ===
==== Bolton Corporation Waterworks ====
The Bolton Corporation Waterworks was established in 1847 when Bolton Corporation purchased the Bolton Waterworks Company.

In 1963 part of the Irwell Valley Water Board and the Bacup Corporation Waterworks were merged into the Bolton Corporation Waterworks by the Bolton Water Order 1962 (SI 1963/209).

Bacup Corporation Waterworks was established under the Bacup Corporation Water Act 1894 (57 & 58 Vict. c. lxv), from the purchase of the Rossendale Waterworks Company, which had itself been created by the Rossendale Waterworks Act 1853 (16 & 17 Vict. c. lix).

==== Carlisle Corporation Waterworks ====
Carlisle Corporation Waterworks was established when Carlisle Corporation purchased the Carlisle Joint Stock Waterworks Company in 1866 using powers in the Local Government Act 1858 (21 & 22 Vict. c. 98). The Carlisle Joint Stock Waterworks Company had been formed in 1847.

==== Liverpool Corporation Waterworks ====
The Liverpool Corporation Waterworks Act 1847 (10 & 11 Vict. c. cclxi) created Liverpool Corporation Waterworks, by taking over the existing private companies that supplied water to Liverpool.

==== Manchester Corporation Waterworks ====
Manchester Corporation Waterworks Act 1847
- Act of Parliament
- Parliament of the United Kingdom
- Long title: An Act to enable the Mayor, Aldermen, and Burgesses of the Borough of Manchester in the County of Lancaster to construct Waterworks for supplying the said Borough and several Places on the Line of the said intended Works with Water; and for other Purposes.
- Citation: 10 & 11 Vict. c. cciii

Dates
- Royal assent: 9 July 1847

Text of statute as originally enacted

Manchester Corporation Waterworks Amendment Act 1848
- Act of Parliament
- Parliament of the United Kingdom
- Long title: An Act to alter, amend, and enlarge the Powers and Provisions of "The Manchester Corporation Waterworks Act, 1847."
- Citation: 11 & 12 Vict. c. ci

Dates
- Royal assent: 22 July 1848

Text of statute as originally enacted

Manchester and Salford Water Act 1809
- Act of Parliament
- Parliament of the United Kingdom
- Long title: An Act for more effectually supplying with Water the Inhabitants of the Towns of Manchester and Salford, in the Parish of Manchester in the County Palatine of Lancaster.
- Citation: 49 Geo. 3. c. cxcii

Dates
- Royal assent: 20 June 1809

Text of statute as originally enacted

North Cheshire Water Act 1864
- Act of Parliament
- Parliament of the United Kingdom
- Long title: An Act to incorporate the Proprietors of the North Cheshire Waterworks Company, Limited, and to confer on them further Powers for the Supply of Water; and for other Purposes.
- Citation: 27 & 28 Vict. c. cvii

Dates
- Royal assent: 23 June 1864

Text of statute as originally enacted

The Manchester Corporation Waterworks was formed by the Manchester Corporation Waterworks Act 1847 (10 & 11 Vict. c. cciii). Manchester Corporation Waterworks built the Longdendale Chain reservoirs, the Audenshaw Reservoirs and the Thirlmere Aqueduct.

The Manchester and Salford Waterworks Company was formed in 1809 by the Manchester and Salford Water Act 1809 (49 Geo. 3. c. cxcii), and purchased by the Manchester Corporation Waterworks in 1883.

The North Cheshire Waterworks Company Limited was incorporated on 10 February 1857 under the Joint Stock Companies Act 1856, supplying water to Altringham, Bowden, Dunham and Sale that it obtained in bulk from the Manchester Corporation Waterworks. That company was dissolved and reincorporated as the North Cheshire Water Company by the North Cheshire Water Act 1864 (27 & 28 Vict. c. cvii), which set the operational area of the company as Bowden, Ashton-upon-Mersey, Northen, Washburton and Lymm. It was acquired by the Manchester Corporation Waterworks under the Manchester Corporation Act 1919 (9 & 10 Geo. 5. c. cxix).

In 1959 Glossop Corporation Waterworks was merged into Manchester Corporation Waterworks. Glossop Corporation had taken over the private Glossop Water Company in 1929. Lord Edward Howard's existing private water supply business was formally approved by the Glossop Waterworks Act 1865 (28 & 29 Vict. c. cxv), and formed the basis of the Glossop Water Company.

==== St. Helens Corporation Waterworks ====
St. Helens Corporation Waterworks started when the Saint Helens Improvement Commissioners acquired the Saint Helens Water Company's undertaking under the Saint Helens Improvement Act 1851 (14 & 15 Vict. c. cxxxii), the undertaking transferring to the new St Helens Corporation when the town became a municipal borough in 1868.

The Saint Helens Waterworks Company had been incorporated by the St. Helens Waterworks Company Act 1843 (6 & 7 Vict. c. xxiii).

==== Widnes Corporation Waterworks ====
Widnes was supplied with water by a private company, the Widnes Gas and Water Company Limited. The company was reincorporated as a statutory company, the Widnes Gas and Water Company, by the Widnes Gas and Water Act 1860 (23 & 24 Vict. c. lxviii).

The Widnes Local Board acquired the undertakings of the Widnes Gas and Water Company by the Widnes Improvement Act 1867 (30 & 31 Vict. c. cxxvi), and Widnes Corporation was formed when the town became a borough in 1892.

==== Calder Water Board ====
The Calder Water Board was formed by the Calder Water Board Order 1962 (SI 1962/1939), serving Nelson, Colne and the surrounding areas of the Pennines. It sourced water from the River Calder and operated the Coldwell reservoirs.

==== Eden Water Board ====
The Eden Water Board was based on Ullswater Road, Penrith, and served the surrounding part of the Eden Valley. It was formed by the Eden Water Board Order 1962 (SI 1962/1796), taking over the North Cumberland Water Board.

The North Cumberland Water Board was formed by the North Cumberland Water Board Act 1947 (10 & 11 Geo. 6. c. xliii).

==== Furness Water Board ====
The Furness Water Board was formed by the Furness Water Board Order 1960 (SI 1960/2350) and served Barrow-in-Furness and the surrounding area. It took over Barrow Corporation Waterworks, and had offices in Hindpool Road, Barrow-in-Furness.

The Barrow Corporation Waterworks was founded by the Barrow-in-Furness Corporation Act 1868 (31 & 32 Vict. c. civ)

==== Fylde Water Board ====
The Fylde Water Board was formed by the Fylde Waterworks (Transfer) Act 1897 (60 & 61 Vict. c. ccxxi). It took over the undertaking of the Fylde Waterworks Company, which was formed by the Fylde Waterworks Act 1861 (24 & 25 Vict. c. cliv).

Under the Fylde Water Board Order 1960 the Fylde Water Board took over the undertakings of the Blackburn Corporation Waterworks, the Preston Corporation Waterworks and the Darwen Corporation Waterworks. Blackburn Corporation Waterworks had been formed when the Blackburn Improvement Act 1854 (17 & 18 Vict. c. clxxxiii) enabled Blackburn Corporation to purchase the private Blackburn Waterworks Company, which had been created by the Blackburn Waterworks Act 1845 (8 & 9 Vict. c. cxxxviii).

Fylde Water Board served Blackpool and the coastal area of The Fylde. It had offices in Sefton Street, Blackpool. The Fylde Water Board built Stocks Reservoir.

==== Lakes and Lune Water Board ====
The Lakes and Lune Water Board was created by the Lakes and Lune Water Board Order 1961 (SI 1962/36), serving the South Lakeland area, including Kendal. Alfred Wainwright worked as treasurer of the water board from 1961 until 1967. The water board was based at Kendal Town Hall.

==== Lune Valley Water Board ====
The Lune Valley Water Board was created by the Lune Valley Water Board Order 1960 (SI 1960/2148), serving the area around Lancaster. It took over the Lancaster Corporation Waterworks.

The Lancaster Corporation Waterworks had been created by the Lancaster Waterworks and Gas Act 1852 (15 & 16 Vict. c. lxvii).

==== Macclesfield District Water Board ====
The Macclesfield District Water Board was constituted by the Macclesfield District Water Board Order 1960 (SI 1960/513).

It took over the Macclesfield Corporation Waterworks which had been created by the Macclesfield Water Act 1830 (11 Geo. 4 & 1 Will. 4. c. cxxiv).

==== Makerfield Water Board ====
The Makerfield Water Board was constituted by the Makerfield Water Board Order 1960 (SI 1960/2178).

==== Mid Cheshire Water Board ====
The Mid and South-East Cheshire Water Board was established by the Mid and South East Cheshire Water Board Act 1946 (9 & 10 Geo. 6. c. xxviii). The name of the water board was changed to Mid Cheshire Water Board from 1 April 1965 by the Mid and South East Cheshire Water Board Order 1965 (SI 1965/248).

It served the area around Winsford and Northwich. Water supply was obtained from the River Dee via the Llangollen Canal.

==== North Calder Water Board ====
The North Calder Water Board was created by the North Calder Water Board Order 1960 (SI 1960/664). It took over the water supply undertaking of Trawden Urban District Council.

==== Preston and District Water Board ====
The Preston and District Water Board supplied water to Preston County Borough, taking over Preston Corporation Waterworks, as well as to the urban districts of Walton-le-Dale, Longridge, Fulwood and Leyland. It was formed by the Preston and District Water Board Order 1959 (SI 1959/588).

The Preston Corporation Waterworks was created by the Preston Waterworks Act 1853 (16 & 17 Vict. c. xlviii), taking over the private Preston Waterworks Company.

The Preston Waterworks Company was founded by the Preston and Fishwick Water Act 1832 (2 & 3 Will. 4. c. xxvii).

==== South Cumberland Water Board ====
The South Cumberland Water Board.

==== Stockport and District Water Board ====
The Stockport and District Water Board was formed on 1 April 1962 by the Stockport and District Water Board Order 1962 (SI 1962/467), with its membership made up of members of Stockport Borough Council, the urban district councils of Alderley Edge, Bredbury and Romiley, Cheadle and Gatley, Hazel Grove and Bramhall, Marple, New Mills, Whaley Bridge and Wilmslow and Disley Rural District Council.

It took over the Stockport Corporation Waterworks, which had been established under the Stockport Corporation Water Act 1899 (62 & 63 Vict. c. ccvii), by taking over the existing undertaking of the Stockport District Waterworks Company.

The Stockport District Waterworks Company was formed in 1861.

The Stockport Waterworks Company had been formed in 1850, and was acquired by the Stockport District Waterworks Company in 1863.

Stockport Corporation had constructed a reservoir at Kinder, in the Derbyshire Peak District. The waterworks opened in 1912, and the Kinder Reservoir had a capacity of 515 million imperial gallons (2,340,000 m^{3}) and covered 44 acres (180,000 m^{2}). At the time of its construction it was stated to have the largest earth dam in the world. In the 1930s the Stockport Corporation acquired land in the Goyt Valley, building two more reservoirs under the Stockport Corporation Act 1930 (20 & 21 Geo. 5. c. clxix): Fernilee opened in 1938 and Errwood in 1967.

==== Warrington, Runcorn and District Water Board ====
The Warrington, Runcorn and District Water Board was formed by the Warrington, Runcorn and District Water Board Order 1970 (SI 1970/293).

The Runcorn District Water Board was created by the Runcorn District Water Board Act 1923 (13 & 14 Geo. 5. c. x) and took over the water undertaking of the Runcorn Urban District Council.

==== West Cumberland Water Board ====
The West Cumberland Water Board was formed by the West Cumberland Water Board Order 1960 (SI 1960/2476).

==== West Lancashire Water Board ====
The West Lancashire Water Board was constituted by the West Lancashire Water Board Order 1960 (SI 1960/2149). It was formed by merging the Southport and District Water Board, and the water undertakings of the urban district councils of Ormskirk and Skelmersdale, and of West Lancashire Rural District Council. It had offices in Portland Street, Southport.

The Southport, Birkdale and West Lancashire Water Board was created by the Southport Water (Transfer) Act 1901 (1 Edw. 7. c. ccxlviii), and took over the Southport Waterworks Company. It was renamed the Southport and District Water Board by the Southport and District Water Act 1929 (19 & 20 Geo. 5. c. lxii).

The Southport Waterworks Company was formed by the Southport Waterworks Act 1854 (17 & 18 Vict. c. xvi) to bring water from Scarisbrick Windmill to Southport.

==== West Pennine Water Board ====
The West Pennine Water Board was formed by the West Pennine Water Order 1968 (SI 1968/512) from the Rochdale Corporation Waterworks, Oldham Corporation Waterworks, the Ashton-under-Lyne, Stalybridge and Dukinfield (District) Waterworks Joint Committee, and the Heywood and Middleton Water Board. It had offices in Oldham.

Ashton-under-Lyne, Stalybridge and Dukinfield (District) Waterworks Act 1870
- Act of Parliament
- Parliament of the United Kingdom
- Long title: An Act for making better provision for the supply of Water to a district consisting of the boroughs of Ashton-under-Lyne and Stalybridge, and the district of the Dukinfield Local Board of Health, and their respective neighbourhoods; and for other purposes.
- Citation: 33 & 34 Vict. c. cxxxi

Dates
- Royal assent: 14 July 1870

Text of statute as originally enacted

The Ashton-under-Lyne, Stalybridge and Dukinfield (District) Waterworks Joint Committee was formed by the Ashton-under-Lyne, Stalybridge and Dukinfield (District) Waterworks Act 1870 (33 & 34 Vict. c. cxxxi). It took over the Ashton-under-Lyne Corporation Waterworks, formed by the Ashton-under-Lyne Corporation Waterworks Act 1855 (18 & 19 Vict. c. lxx), which had itself taken over the private Ashton-under-Lyne Waterworks Company founded under the Ashton-under-Lyne Water Act 1835 (5 & 6 Will. 4. c. lxi).

Heywood Waterworks (Transfer) Act 1898
- Act of Parliament
- Parliament of the United Kingdom
- Long title: An Act to extend the time for the construction of certain waterworks authorised by the Heywood Waterworks Act 1877[ba] to vest the water undertaking of the Heywood Corporation in a joint Board and for other purposes.
- Citation: 61 & 62 Vict. c. ccxl

Dates
- Royal assent: 12 August 1898

Other legislation
- Repealed by: West Pennine Water Order 1968

Status: Repealed

Text of statute as originally enacted

The Heywood and Middleton Water Board was created by the Heywood Waterworks (Transfer) Act 1898 (61 & 62 Vict. c. ccxl). It was formed from the existing Heywood Corporation Waterworks, which had expanded to provide for the Borough of Middleton.

Heywood Waterworks Act 1877
- Act of Parliament
- Parliament of the United Kingdom
- Long title: An Act to enable the Heywood Waterworks Company to construct additional Works; and for other purposes.
- Citation: 40 & 41 Vict. c. clii

Dates
- Royal assent: 2 August 1877

Text of statute as originally enacted

Heywood Waterworks Act 1846
- Act of Parliament
- Parliament of the United Kingdom
- Long title: An Act for the better supplying with Water the Town or Village of Heywood, and Places adjacent thereto, in the County Palatine of Lancaster.
- Citation: 9 & 10 Vict. c. cclxxxvi

Dates
- Royal assent: 27 July 1846

Other legislation
- Repealed by: Heywood Waterworks Amendment Act 1855

Status: Repealed

Heywood Corporation Waterworks was established by the Heywood Waterworks Act 1877 (40 & 41 Vict. c. clii), which allowed the Local Board of Heywood to purchase the undertaking of the private Heywood Waterworks Company, which had been incorporated by the Heywood Waterworks Act 1846 (9 & 10 Vict. c. cclxxxvi).

==== Wirral Water Board ====
The West Cheshire Water Board was constituted by the West Cheshire Water Board Act 1925 (15 & 16 Geo. 5. c. cxiii). It took over the water undertakings of the West Cheshire Water Company and the pumping station and reservoirs at Prenton belonging to the Wirral Waterworks Company.

The West Cheshire Water Company had been authorised by the West Cheshire Water Act 1884 (47 & 48 Vict. c. lii).

The Wirral Waterworks Company had been authorised by the Wirral Waterworks Act 1859 (22 & 23 Vict. c. lviii).

The Wirral Water Board Order 1963 (SI 1963/1508) changed the name of the water board to the Wirral Water Board from 1 October 1963.
