= Trent River Authority =

Monitored river in England

The Trent River Authority was one of 27 river authorities created by the Water Resources Act 1963 (1963 C. 38). It took over the powers of the existing Trent River Board and was given additional duties to monitor water quality and protect water resources.

Under the terms of the Water Act 1973 (1973 c.37), the authority was amalgamated with the Severn River Authority, along with the water supply and sewerage disposal functions exercised by local authorities within their areas, to form the Severn Trent Water Authority in 1974.

== Area ==
The area covered by the Trent River Authority was the catchment area of the River Trent. The surface area was 4,029 square miles (10,440 km^{2}), making it the third-largest in area after the Yorkshire and Severn river authorities.

The authority covered the major part of the counties of Nottinghamshire, Derbyshire, Staffordshire and Leicestershire and large parts of Warwickshire, Lincolnshire and the West Riding of Yorkshire. It also covered a small part of the counties of Rutland, Worcestershire and Shropshire.

The major cities within the authority's area included Wolverhampton, Birmingham, Walsall, Stoke-on-Trent, Leicester, Derby and Nottingham.

The most important rivers within the area was the River Trent and its tributaries including the Derwent, Dove, Sow, Tame, Soar, Devon, Idle, Erewash and Leen.

== Organisation ==
The authority was constituted by Order of the Minister of Housing and Local Government dated 18 June 1964 and consisted of 39 members, 20 of whom were appointed by county councils and county borough councils in their area. The others were appointed to represent various interests, namely:

- agriculture (2 members appointed by the Minister of Agriculture, Fisheries and Food)
- fisheries (2 members appointed by the Minister of Agriculture, Fisheries and Food)
- industry (4 members appointed by the Minister of Housing and Local Government)
- land drainage (5 members appointed by the Minister of Agriculture, Fisheries and Food)
- the National Coal Board (1 member)
- river navigation (1 member appointed by the Minister of Transport)
- public water supply (2 members appointed by the Minister of Agriculture, Fisheries and Food)

The headquarters of the authority was in Nottingham. The authority had a number of committees, each dealing with a different aspect of its work, and it operated through four departments as follows:

- Clerk's Department: dealt with all administrative and legal matters
- Engineer's Department: dealt with matters concerning land drainage and water conservation and was split into three divisions based at Gainsborough, Nottingham and Tamworth
- Pollution Control and Fisheries Department
- Treasurer's Department: dealt with all financial matters.

== Main rivers ==
Under the Land Drainage Act 1930, the authority was responsible for the maintenance of what are still termed main rivers, which, as the name implies, were the most important stretches of water channels within its area. The total length of the statutory main river, which the authority was responsible for, was 905 miles (1,456 km).

== Arms ==
Coat of arms of Trent River Authority
| Notes Granted 1 August 1967 Crest On a wreath of the colours standing on a fish wheel Or a heron Proper collared Or. Escutcheon Barry wavy of eight Azure and Argent a saltire couped Gules and in chief an ancient crown Or. Supporters On the dexter side a lion Sable supporting between the forelegs a ditching spade Proper and on the sinister side a stag likewise supporting a pipette Proper. Motto Pax Fiat Per Fluminis Aquas |

== See also ==
- List of fish in the River Trent
