= Water authority =

A Water Authority may refer to:

- A Water board
- One of 12 Regional water authorities operational in England and Wales between 1974 and 1985.
