= Severn Trent Water Authority =

UK regional water authority, 1974–1989

- Industry: Water industry
- Founded: 1975; 51 years ago
- Headquarters: Birmingham, England
- Products: Drinking water; Recycled wastewater

Severn Trent Water Authority was one of ten regional water authorities established in 1974. Its area of operation was the catchments of the River Trent and River Severn. It assumed the powers and responsibilities of existing water supply authorities in those catchment areas, the Severn River Authority, the Trent River Authority and the sewage and sewage disposal responsibilities of the councils within its area.

It took its name from the two major rivers in this area, the Severn and the Trent.

In July 1989, the authority was partly privatised under the Water Act 1989, together with most of the rest of the water supply and sewage disposal industry in England and Wales, to form Severn Trent Water, with a responsibility to supply freshwater and treat sewage for around 8 million people living in the Midlands of England and also a small area of Wales. The remaining regulatory and control functions such as pollution control, flood prevention and water resource management were subsumed into the newly formed National Rivers Authority.

== Statutory water undertakers acquired ==
It took over the following public-sector statutory water undertakers:

- Birmingham Corporation Water Department
- Coventry Corporation Waterworks
- Leicester Corporation Waterworks
- City of Nottingham Water Department
- Stafford Corporation Waterworks
- Wolverhampton Corporation Waterworks
- Cannock Rural District Council Waterworks
- Central Nottinghamshire Water Board
- East Shropshire Water Board
- Montgomeryshire Water Board
- North Derbyshire Water Board
- North East Warwickshire Water Board
- North West Gloucestershire Water Board
- North West Leicestershire Water Board
- North West Worcestershire Water Board
- Rugby Joint Water Board
- South Derbyshire Water Board
- South Warwickshire Water Board
- South West Worcestershire Water Board
- Staffordshire Potteries Water Board
- West Shropshire Water Board

Section 12 of the Water Act 1973 stated that "where the area of a water authority includes the whole or part of the limits of supply of a statutory water company, the authority shall discharge their duties with respect to the supply of water within those limits through the company." The following two private statutory water companies continued to supply water as before within their limits as supply but only as "agents" of the water authority:

- East Worcestershire Waterworks Company
- South Staffordshire Waterworks Company

The water authority remained responsible for sewerage and sewage disposal within the limits of supply of these two companies. On 1 September 1993, the East Worcestershire Waterworks Company was merged into Severn Trent Water as per the East Worcester and Severn Trent Water (Amendment of Local Enactments etc.) Order 1993 (SI 1993/2130)

=== Predecessors ===
==== Coventry Corporation Waterworks ====
Coventry Corporation Waterworks was founded by the Coventry Water Supply Act 1844 (7 & 8 Vict. c. lvi).

==== Leicester Corporation Waterworks ====
Leicester Corporation Waterworks was created when Leicester Corporation took over the private Leicester Waterworks Company by the Leicester Corporation Gas and Water Transfer Act 1878 (41 & 42 Vict. c. cxxxii). They also took over the Leicester Gas Company by the same act.

The Leicester Waterworks Company was founded by the Leicester Waterworks Act 1847 (10 & 11 Vict. c. cclxxxii).

==== City of Nottingham Water Department ====
Known as Nottingham Corporation Waterworks until 1912.

==== Wolverhampton Corporation Waterworks ====
Wolverhampton Corporation Waterworks was formed when the Wolverhampton Waterworks Transfer Act 1867 (30 & 31 Vict. c. cxxxiii) transferred the undertaking of the Wolverhampton New Waterworks Company to Wolverhampton Corporation. The Wolverhampton New Waterworks company continued to exist and was finally wound-up by the Wolverhampton Corporation Act 1950 (14 Geo. 6. c. lviii).

The Wolverhampton New Waterworks Company was incorporated by the Wolverhampton New Waterworks Act 1855 (18 & 19 Vict. c. cli). It took over the older Wolverhampton Waterworks Company by the Wolverhampton Waterworks Transfer Act 1856 (19 & 20 Vict. c. lvii).

The Wolverhampton Waterworks Company was incorporated by the Wolverhampton Waterworks Act 1845 (8 & 9 Vict. c. cxxxv). It had works at Tettenhall and at Goldthorn Hill, Wolverhampton.

==== Central Nottinghamshire Water Board ====
The Central Nottinghamshire Water Board was formed by the Central Nottinghamshire Water Board Order 1963 (SI 1963/1332) from 11 existing water undertakings from the county borough of Nottingham; the boroughs of Mansfield, Newark and Worksop; the urban districts of Kirkby-in-Ashfield, Mansfield Woodhouse, Sutton-in-Ashfield and Warsop; and the rural districts of Blackwell, Newark, Southwell and Worksop.

Newark Corporation Waterworks.

==== East Shropshire Water Board ====
The East Shropshire Water Board was formed on 1 April 1949 by the East Shropshire Water Board Order 1948 (SI 1948/2399). It was based in Wellington, Shropshire.

==== Montgomeryshire Water Board ====
Montgomeryshire Water Board was created by the Montgomeryshire Water Board Order 1960 (SI 1960/2070).

==== North Derbyshire Water Board ====
The North Derbyshire Water Board was created by the North Derbyshire Water Board Order 1962 (SI 1963/660). It took over the existing Chesterfield, Bolsover and Clowne Water Board, North East Derbyshire Joint Water Committee, Buxton Corporation Waterworks, and the water undertakings of Bakewell Urban District Council and Chapel-en-le-Frith Rural District Council. It served Chesterfield, Bakewell and Buxton and surrounding areas.

The Chesterfield and Bolsover Water Board was established in 1933. In 1952 it was renamed the Chesterfield, Bolsover and Clowne Water Board. It took over the water supply undertaking of the Chesterfield Gas and Water Board.

The Chesterfield Gas and Water Board was created by the Chesterfield Gas and Water Board Act 1895 (58 & 59 Vict. c. cxlvii), taking over the private Chesterfield Waterworks and Gaslight Company's business.

The Chesterfield Waterworks and Gaslight Company had been founded by the Chesterfield Waterworks and Gas Light Company Act 1825 (6 Geo. 4. c. lxvi).

The Clay Cross Waterworks Company.

The Staveley Waterworks Company was incorporated by the Staveley Waterworks Act 1871 (34 & 35 Vict. c. cxxvii).

==== North East Warwickshire Water Board ====
The North East Warwickshire Water Board was established by the North East Warwickshire Water Board Order 1960 (SI 1960/154).

==== North West Gloucestershire Water Board ====
The North West Gloucestershire Water Board was formed on 1 April 1965 by the North West Gloucestershire Water Board Order 1964 (SI 1964/1895). It was made by merging the water undertakings of Gloucester Corporation, Cheltenham Corporation, Stroud District Water Board, Gloucester and Cheltenham Joint Water Board, East Dean Rural District Council, West Dean Rural District Council, Lydney Rural District Council, and Cheltenham Rural District Council.

Gloucester Corporation Waterworks was formed when Gloucester Corporation bought out the Gloucester Water Company under an order confirmed by the Public Health Supplemental Act 1849 (12 & 13 Vict. c. 94).

The Gloucester Water Company was formed by the Gloucester Water Act 1836 (6 & 7 Will. 4. c. lxvii). It took over the waterworks at Robinswood Hill, Matson owned at that point by The Viscount Sydney

The waterworks at Robinswood Hill were created by John Selwyn MP, who was contracted by Gloucester Corporation to build and operate the waterworks under the Gloucester Water Supply Act 1740 (14 Geo. 2. c. 11). It replaced an earlier pipeline from springs at Robinswood Hill, which had been installed by Gloucester Abbey, and were transferred to Gloucester Corporation after the Dissolution of the Monasteries by the Gloucester Water Supply Act 1541 (33 Hen. 8. c. 35).

Cheltenham Corporation Waterworks was formed by the Cheltenham Corporation Water Act 1878 (41 & 42 Vict. c. cciii), enabling Cheltenham Corporation to acquire the private Cheltenham Waterworks Company.

The Cheltenham Waterworks Company was established by the Cheltenham Water Act 1824 (5 Geo. 4. c. cxxxii).

The Stroud District Water Board had been formed by the Stroud District Water Board &c. Act 1939 (2 & 3 Geo. 6. c. lxvii) from the Stroud Water Company and the water undertakings of the Stroud Urban District Council and the Stroud Rural District Council.

The Stroud Water Company was established a first time by the Stroud Water Act 1875 (38 & 39 Vict. c. ccxiv), and as a second incorporation by the Stroud Water Act 1882 (45 & 46 Vict. c. lxxxi).

The Gloucester and Cheltenham Joint Water Board was established by the Cheltenham and Gloucester Joint Water Board, &c Act 1936 (26 Geo. 5 & 1 Edw. 8. c. cxxix).

==== North West Leicestershire Water Board ====
The North West Leicestershire Water Board was created by the North West Leicestershire Water Board Order 1964 (SI 1964/1712).

==== North West Worcestershire Water Board ====
The North West Worcestershire Water Board was established by the North West Worcestershire Water Board Order 1962 (SI 1962/1561).

==== Rugby Joint Water Board ====
The Rugby Joint Water Board was created by the Rugby Joint Water Board Order 1961 (SI 1961/2193).

==== South Derbyshire Water Board ====
The South Derbyshire Water Board was formed by the South Derbyshire Water Board Order 1961 (SI 1961/281). It was initially based in Tenant Street, Derby; purpose-built offices were later constructed off Raynesway, Derby. They took over from Derby Corporation Waterworks, and the Worksop Urban District Council, who by the Worksop Urban District Council Act 1910 (10 Edw. 7 & 1 Geo. 5. c. xl) bought out the private Worksop Waterworks Company.

The Derby Corporation Waterworks.

The Derby Waterworks Company was founded by the Derby Waterworks Act 1848 (11 & 12 Vict. c. xxxvi).

The Worksop Waterworks Company had been authorised by the Worksop Waterworks Act 1875 (38 & 39 Vict. c. lxiii).

==== South Warwickshire Water Board ====
The South Warwickshire Water Board was established by the South Warwickshire Water Board Order 1963 (SI 1963/38).

==== South West Worcestershire Water Board ====
South West Worcestershire Water Board was constituted by the South West Worcestershire Water Board Order 1968 (SI 1968/1405).

==== Staffordshire Potteries Water Board ====
The Staffordshire Potteries Water Board was formed by the Staffordshire Potteries Water Board Act 1924 (14 & 15 Geo. 5. c. Ixviii) to acquire the business of the Staffordshire Potteries Water Works Company. It had offices in Albion Street, Hanley.

The Staffordshire Potteries Water Board acquired the water supply of the Leek Urban District Council under the Leek Urban District Council Water Act 1925 (15 & 16 Geo. 5. c. civ). This had supplied the town from reservoirs on Leek Moor, originally by the Earl of Macclesfield under authority of the Leek Water Act 1827 (7 & 8 Geo. 4. c. xxxvii). This private undertaking was bought out by the Leek Improvement Commissioners using powers granted by the Leek Improvement Act 1855 (18 & 19 Vict. c. cxxxii).

The Staffordshire Potteries Water Board also acquired the water supply of the Stone Urban District Council, under the Staffordshire Potteries Water Board Act 1949 (12, 13 & 14 Geo. 6. c. xl). A bore-hole pumping station had been established on Longton Road by the Stone Local Board of Health using powers in the Public Health Act 1875 (38 & 39 Vict. c. 55). A reservoir was constructed above the pumping station on Red Hill, and the system came into operation in 1890.

==== West Shropshire Water Board ====
The West Shropshire Water Board was formed by the West Shropshire Water Board Order 1963 (SI 1964/21).

== Other organisations and functions acquired ==
The water authority took over the following public-sector bulk water suppliers:

- Derwent Valley Water Board
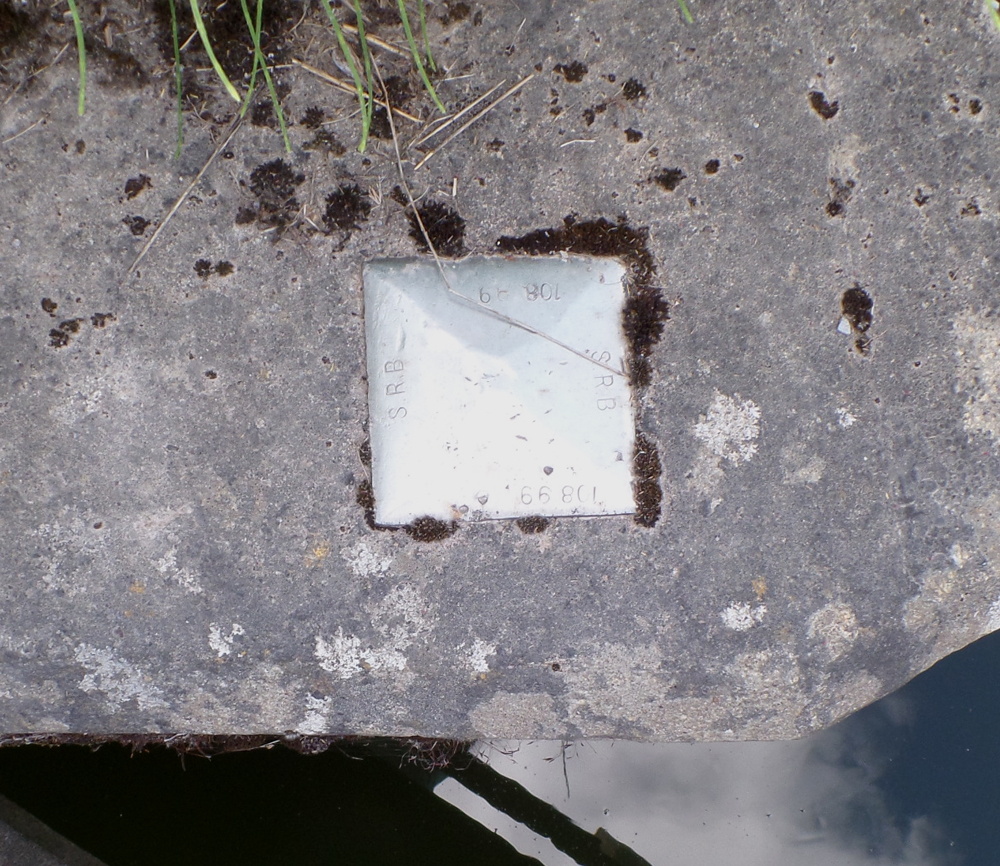
  flood monitor benchmark Ebley wier, Stroud, Gloucestershire, inscribed SRB
- River Dove Water Board

It took over the following main drainage authorities, which were joint boards set up to deal with the main sewerage and sewage treatment in their respective areas:

- Upper Tame Main Drainage Authority
- Upper Stour Main Drainage Authority

It took over two river authorities, responsible for control of water pollution, water resource management and flood prevention:

- Trent River Authority
- Severn River Authority

The authority also took over the functions responsible for sewerage and sewage disposal from all local authorities, including main drainage authorities, within its area; however, section 15 of the Water Act 1973 allowed district (but not county) councils to enter into agency agreements with water authorities whereby the district councils became their "agents" for the maintenance and design and construction of new sewers.

== Reservoirs ==
The company abstracted water from a number of reservoirs. These included:

- Carsington Reservoir – River Derwent compensation flow pumped storage facility
- Upper Derwent Valley (Derwent, Howden and Ladybower Reservoirs) – Built by the Derwent Valley Water Board to supply the cities of Sheffield, Derby, Nottingham and Leicester
- Draycote Water
- Foremark Reservoir
- Shustoke Reservoir
- Tittesworth reservoir
- Ogston Reservoir, in the Amber Valley
- Linacre Reservoirs (non operational since 1995)

It also operated the filtration works at the Elan Valley Reservoirs

It also had abstraction licences for river abstractions which included operating rules linked to storage at both Clywedog reservoir and Lake Vyrnwy although no water from those reservoirs was directly piped to supply.

== See also ==
- Regional water authority
