= List of statutory instruments of the United Kingdom, 1966 =

This is an incomplete list of statutory instruments of the United Kingdom in 1966.

== Statutory instruments ==
=== 1-499 ===
- Construction (Working Places) Regulations 1966 (SI 1966/94)
- Sheffield Water Order 1966 (SI 1966/133)
- Alexandra Park and Palace Order 1966 (SI 1966/199)
- Middle Thames Water Board Order 1966 (SI 1966/214)
- Sweden (Extradition) Order 1966 (SI 1966/226)
- Road Vehicles (Index Marks) (Amendment) Regulations 1966 (SI 1966/250)
- Settlingstones Mine (Storage Battery Locomotives) Special Regulations 1966 (SI 1966/351)
- London (Heathrow) Airport Noise Insulation Grants Scheme 1966 (SI 1966/424)

=== 500-999 ===
- West Surrey Water Board Order 1966 (SI 1966/538)
- Sweden (Extradition) (Extension) Order 1966 (SI 1966/811)

=== 1000-1499 ===
- West Glamorgan Water Board Order 1966 (SI 1966/1096)
- Sheffield Water (No. 2) Order 1966 (SI 1966/1116)
- Oxfordshire and District Water Board Order 1966 (SI 1966/1163)
- South Wilts Water Board Order 1966 (SI 1966/1425)
- St. Helena (Constitution) Order 1966 (SI 1966/1458)

== See also ==
- List of statutory instruments of the United Kingdom
