= List of statutory instruments of the United Kingdom, 1960 =

This is an incomplete list of statutory instruments of the United Kingdom in 1960.

== Statutory instruments ==
=== 1-499 ===
- Coal and Other Mines (Shafts, Outlets and Roads) Regulations 1960 (SI 1960/69)
- Fylde Water Board Order 1960 (SI 1960/89)
- Plant and Machinery (Rating) Order 1960 (SI 1960/122)
- North East Warwickshire Water Board Order 1960 (SI 1960/154)
- West Cornwall Water Board Order 1960 (SI 1960/155)
- Newport and South Monmouthshire Water Board Order 1960 (SI 1960/161)
- Opencast Coal (Fees) Regulations 1960 (SI 1960/194)
- Family Allowances, National Insurance and Industrial Injuries (Denmark) Order 1960 (SI 1960/211)
- Heights Mine (Storage Battery Locomotives) Special Regulations 1960 (SI 1960/223)
- Cycle Racing on Highways Regulations 1960 (SI 1960/250)
- Cycle Racing on Highways (Scotland) Regulations 1960 (SI 1960/270)
- Western European Union (Immunities and Privileges) Order 1960 (SI 1960/444)
- Parliamentary Constituencies (Scotland) (Midlothian, Edinburgh East, Edinburgh South, Edinburgh West and Edinburgh Pentlands) Order 1960 (SI 1960/468)
- Parliamentary Constituencies (Scotland) (West Fife and Dunfermline Burghs) Order 1960 (SI 1960/469)
- Parliamentary Constituencies (Scotland) (West Renfrewshire and Greenock) Order 1960 (SI 1960/470)

=== 500-999 ===
- Macclesfield District Water Board Order 1960 (SI 1960/513)
- Election Petition Rules 1960 (SI 1960/543)
- Whaling Industry (Ship) (Amendment) Regulations 1960 (SI 1960/547)
- Don Valley Water Board Order 1960 (SI 1960/624)
- Barnsley Corporation (Water Charges) Order 1960 (SI 1960/641)
- North Calder Water Board Order 1960 (SI 1960/664)
- Diving Operations Special Regulations 1960 (SI 1960/688)
- Post-War Credit (Income Tax) Amendment Regulations 1960 (SI 1960/769)
- British Transport Commission (Male Wages Grades Pensions) (Amendment) Regulations 1960 (SI 1960/784)
- Foreign Compensation (Czechoslovakia) (Registration) Order 1960 (SI 1960/849)
- British Seamen's Cards Order 1960 (SI 1960/967)

=== 1000-1499 ===
- Coal Mines (Firedamp Drainage) Regulations 1960 (SI 1960/1015)
- British Transport Commission (Horsted Keynes and Sheffield Park) Light Railway Order 1960 (SI 1960/1022)
- Washing Facilities (Running Water) Exemption Regulations 1960 (SI 1960/1029)
- Visiting Forces (Royal Australian Air Force) Order 1960 (SI 1960/1053)
- Visiting Forces Act (Application to Colonies) (Amendment) Order 1960 (SI 1960/1061)
- National Insurance (Non-participation-Benefits and Schemes) Amendment Regulations 1960 (SI 1960/1104)
- Coal and Other Mines (Ventilation) (Variation) Regulations 1960 (SI 1960/1116)
- Traffic Signs (Speed Limits) Regulations 1960 (SI 1960/1124)
- Mental Health Review Tribunal Rules 1960 (SI 1960/1139)
- Colchester and District Water Board Order 1960 (SI 1960/1187)
- Barnsley Water Order 1960 (SI 1960/1195)
- Washing Facilities (Miscellaneous Industries) Regulations 1960 (SI 1960/1214)
- National Insurance (Pensions, Existing Contributors) (Transitional) Amendment Regulations 1960 (SI 1960/1226)
- Holyrood Park (First Amendment) Regulations 1960 (SI 1960/1236)
- Sovereign Base Areas of Akrotiri and Dhekelia Order in Council 1960 (SI 1960/1369)
- Federal Republic of Germany (Extradition) Order 1960 (SI 1960/1375)
- International Development Association Order 1960 (SI 1960/1383)
- Leeds (Lindley Wood Reservoir) Water Order 1960 (SI 1960/1453)
- Bedfordshire Water Board Order 1960 (SI 1960/1473)
- Caravan Sites (Licence Applications) Order 1960 (SI 1960/1474)

=== 1500-1999 ===
- Luton Water Order 1960 (SI 1960/1515)
- Mid-Wessex Water Order 1960 (SI 1960/1553)
- Betting and Gaming Act 1960 (Commencement No. 1) Order 1960 (SI 1960/1556)
- Israel (Extradition) Order 1960 (SI 1960/1660)
- Merchant Shipping (Certificates of Competency as A.B.) (Mauritius) Order 1960 (SI 1960/1662)
- Merchant Shipping (Certificates of Competency as A.B.) (Trinidad and Tobago) Order 1960 (SI 1960/1663)
- Betting (Licensing) Regulations 1960 (SI 1960/1701)
- Tuberculosis (England and Wales Attested Area) Order 1960 (SI 1960/1708)
- National Insurance (Non-participation-Local Government Staffs) Regulations 1960 (SI 1960/1725)
- British Wool Marketing Scheme (Directions) Amendment Order 1960 (SI 1960/1726)
- Coal Mines (Precautions against Inflammable Dust) (Variation) Regulations 1960 (SI 1960/1738)
- Factories (Cleanliness of Walls and Ceilings) Order 1960 (SI 1960/1794)
- Shipbuilding and Ship-repairing Regulations 1960 (SI 1960/1932)
- Visiting Forces (Canadian Military and Air Forces) Order 1960 (SI 1960/1956)
- Merchant Shipping (Confirmation of Legislation) (Sarawak) Order 1960 (SI 1960/1963)
- Post Office Register (Trustee Savings Banks) (Amendment) Regulations 1960 (SI 1960/1984)
- Trustee Savings Banks Life Annuity (Amendment) Regulations 1960 (SI 1960/1985)

=== 2000-2499 ===
- Dock Workers (Regulation of Employment) (Amendment) Order 1960 (SI 1960/2029)
- Montgomeryshire Water Board Order 1960 (SI 1960/2070)
- Lune Valley Water Board Order 1960 (SI 1960/2148)
- West Lancashire Water Board Order 1960 (SI 1960/2149)
- Makerfield Water Board Order 1960 (SI 1960/2178)
- National Insurance (Non-participation-Fire Services) Regulations 1960 (SI 1960/2185)
- Legal Aid (Scotland) (General) Regulations 1960 (SI 1960/2195)
- British Nationality (Cyprus) Order 1960 (SI 1960/2215)
- Merchant Shipping (Registration of Scottish Fishery Cruisers, Research Ships etc.) Order 1960 (SI 1960/2217)
- North Cornwall Water Board Order 1960 (SI 1960/2259)
- Arsenic in Food (Amendment) Regulations 1960 (SI 1960/2261)
- Act of Sederunt (Legal Aid Rules Amendment) 1960 (SI 1960/2269)
- National Insurance (Non-participation-Police) Regulations 1960 (SI 1960/2288)
- Leeds (Thruscross Reservoir) Water Order 1960 (SI 1960/2298)
- Bills of Sale (Local Registration) Rules 1960 (SI 1960/2326) (L. 21)
- Furness Water Board Order 1960 (SI 1960/2350)
- Census of Distribution (1962) (Restriction on Disclosure) Order 1960 (SI 1960/2364)
- Charities (Exception of Voluntary Schools from Registration) Regulations 1960 (SI 1960/2366)
- Merchant Shipping (Confirmation of Legislation) (North Borneo) Order 1960 (SI 1960/2413)
- Double Taxation Relief (Air Transport Profits) (Iran) Order 1960 (SI 1960/2419)
- Tithe (Copies of Instruments of Apportionment) Rules 1960 (SI 1960/2440)
- North East Lincolnshire Water Order 1960 (SI 1960/2449)
- West Cumberland Water Board Order 1960 (SI 1960/2476)

== See also ==
- List of statutory instruments of the United Kingdom
