= Welsh National Water Development Authority =

Water authority for Wales (1973–1989)

The Welsh National Water Development Authority (WNWDA) (Awdurdod Cenedlaethol Datblygu Dwr Cymru in Welsh) and later the Welsh Water Authority was one of ten regional water authorities set up in the UK and came into existence on 6 August 1973 with its headquarters in Brecon by virtue of the Water Act 1973. It took over the sewerage and sewage disposal responsibilities of the local authorities within its area, the roles and responsibilities of the six existing River Authorities in Wales and most of the water supply undertakings. The authority was dissolved in 1989 as part of the privatisation of the water industry.

== Remit ==
It brought together all the sewage disposal and sewerage functions from the following local authorities:

- Anglesey County Council
- Cardiff County Borough Council
- Carmarthen Borough Council
- Carmarthen Rural District Council
- Ceiriog Rural District Council (Note: That part of the council's area within the catchment area of the River Dee.)
- Cwmamman Urban District Council
- Llandeilo Urban District Council
- Llandeilo Rural District Council
- Llandovery Borough Council
- Maelor Rural District Council
- Wrexham Rural District Council

It took over the water supply functions previously held by local authorities in Wales which were:

- Birmingham Corporation Water Department (Elan Valley Reservoirs)
- Bwrdd Dŵr Eryri (Eryri Water Board)
- Cardiganshire Water Board
- Central Flintshire Water Board
- Conway Valley Water Board
- Gwent Water Board
- Herefordshire Water Board
- Llanelli and District Water Board
- Loughor Joint Water Board
- Merioneth Water Board
- Mid-Glamorgan Water Board
- Pembrokeshire Water Board
- Radnorshire and North Breconshire Water Board
- South-East Breconshire Water Board
- Taf Fechan Water Board
- West Denbighshire and West Flintshire Water Board
- West Glamorgan Water Board

The two private water companies in the area, Chester Waterworks Company and Wrexham and East Denbighshire Water Company, were excluded and continued in operation.

It also subsumed all the functions of the six river authorities in Wales – the Wye River Authority, the Usk River Authority, the Glamorgan River Authority, the South West Wales River Authority, the Gwynedd River Authority and the Dee and Clwyd River Authority. The boundary of WNWDA was identical to that of the constituent river authorities and included parts of England in both the River Wye and River Dee catchments.

=== Predescessors ===
==== Taf Fechan Water Board ====
The Taf Fechan Water Board was constituted by the Taf Fechan Water Board Order 1964 (SI 1965/1588).

The Taf Fechan Water Supply Board was created by the Taf Fechan Water Supply Act 1921 (11 & 12 Geo. 5. c. lxxxix) to supply water to the Rhymney Valley Water Board, the Pontypridd and Rhondda Joint Water Board, the urban district councils of Aberdare and Llantrisant & Llantwit Fardre, and the Merthyr Tydfil Corporation Waterworks.

The Rhymney Valley Water Board was formed by the Rhymney Valley Water Act 1921 (11 & 12 Geo. 5. c. lxxxiii).

The Pontypridd and Rhondda Joint Water Board was established by the Pontypridd and Rhondda Water Act 1910 (10 Edw. 7 & 1 Geo. 5. c. cxx), taking over the private Pontypridd Waterworks Company.

The Pontypridd Waterworks Company was incorporated by the Pontypridd Waterworks Act 1864 (27 & 28 Vict. c. xxxvi).

== Organisation ==
At inception, WNWDA was organised in units that broadly reflected the originating business. Thus sewerage and sewage disposal was organised into a number of sewage divisions, water supply was similarly formed into a number of water divisions and river divisions exactly matching the roles and boundaries of the previous river authorities were created.

In 1984 a major re-structuring brought all the functions together in three multidisciplinary divisions, with a headquarters in Brecon. These were the South Eastern Division based in Nelson, South Western Division based in Haverfordwest, the Northern Division based in Bangor. There were sub-offices located in Hereford, Monmouth, Swansea, Lampeter, Caernarfon and Mold. At the time of this re-organisation the name of the authority changed to Welsh Water Authority.

== Governance ==
The authority was governed by a board which included representatives from local authorities, central government and the major industries in Wales including agriculture. The chairman appointed by the government of the day was Lord Brecon but he was replaced by T. M. Haydn Rees in 1976 and then by John Elfed Jones in 1982.

== Privatisation ==
In 1989 the water supply, sewerage, and sewage disposal functions of the authority were privatised to form Welsh Water with the regulatory and control functions passing to the newly created National Rivers Authority.
