= Veolia Water Southeast =

English company supplying water in Kent

Veolia Water Southeast Limited
- Type: Subsidiary
- Industry: Water supply
- Founded: June 1848
- Defunct: 2012 (merged into Affinity Water)
- Headquarters: Folkestone, Kent
- Key people: Paul Sabin DL (Chairman); Nevil Muncaster (Managing Director); Gavin McHale (Head of Operations); Chris Taylor (Head of Capital Investment and Asset Management); Tim Charlesworth (Head of Finance & Support Services); Pauline Wilson (Head of Customer Relationships)
- Revenue: ▲£17.3m (2008)
- Number of employees: 93 (2008)
- Parent: Veolia Environnement (through Veolia Water)
- Website: southeast.veoliawater.co.uk

Veolia Water Southeast (formerly Folkestone and Dover Water Services) was a privately owned company supplying water in south east Kent, England. The company's chairman was Paul Sabin.

== History ==
Folkestone Waterworks Act 1848
- Act of Parliament
- Parliament of the United Kingdom
- Long title: An Act for supplying the Parish and Township or Borough of Folkestone with Water.
- Citation: 11 & 12 Vict. c. vi

Dates
- Royal assent: 9 June 1848

Text of statute as originally enacted

The history of the company can be traced back to Folkestone's first piped water supply. Aside from the part of Kent which is closest to London, Folkestone was the first town in the county to have a public water supply operated under the powers of the Waterworks Clauses Act 1847 (10 & 11 Vict. c. 17) – the act which opened the way to create water undertakings throughout the land – when the Folkestone Waterworks Company was incorporated by the Folkestone Waterworks Act 1848 (11 & 12 Vict. c. vi). It would later be renamed the Folkestone and District Water Company by the Kent Water Act 1955 (4 & 5 Eliz. 2. c. xi), which also transferred Folkestone Corporation Waterworks and Hythe Corporation Waterworks into the company. It became Folkestone and Dover Water Services Limited in 1992.

The company was renamed Veolia Water Southeast in July 2009 following plans by Veolia Water UK to use the brand across its businesses. Veolia Water UK is part of the Veolia Environnement group of companies. In 2012, following the sale of Veolia Water's UK water supply business, it was merged with Veolia Water Central and Veolia Water East to form Affinity Water on 1 October 2012. Veolia Water Southeast was a water only company providing around 43 million litres of water a day to approximately 158,000 customers throughout Folkestone and Dover together with surrounding rural areas including Romney Marsh and Dungeness.

== Operations ==
The area served was entirely reliant on water stored underground in chalk or gravel aquifers, as there was no surface water from rivers or major reservoirs to draw on.

The company head office was located close to the original reservoir site used by the company over 150 years ago.

Between 2009 and 2011, Veolia Water embarked on a programme of installing water meters, beginning with Folkestone and moving to other areas.

== See also ==
- United Kingdom water companies
