= Ordinary watercourse =

An ordinary watercourse is one of the two types of watercourse in statutory language in England and Wales.

== Definition ==
Ordinary watercourses include every river, stream, ditch, drain, cut, dyke, sluice, sewer (other than a public sewer) and passage through which water flows and which does not form part of a main river. An internal drainage board where relevant, or lead local authority has permissive powers to carry out flood defence works for ordinary watercourses at their discretion.

== Flood risk management ==
Lead Local Flood Authorities have lead responsibility for managing the risk of flooding from surface water, groundwater and ordinary watercourses. They have permissive power to carry out flood defence works at their discretion. This implies that a residual responsibility to maintain ordinary watercourses, and to report any issues with them to lead local flood authorities, (county councils or unitary authorities) rests in tort with riparian owners, that is owners of land adjoining such watercourses. Such watercourses were historically defined as non-navigable watercourses however their designation has changed to those watercourses not included on a 'main rivers map' and whose bed is not owned by an authority.

== Critical Ordinary Watercourse ==
Critical Ordinary Watercourses (COWs) are a subdivision of ordinary watercourses, certain anti-flooding responsibility for which was assumed by the Environment Agency. They were created following Defra's Flood and Coastal Defence Funding Review published in February 2003. The transfer to EA of approximately 1,800 watercourses has now been completed in three phases (1 November 2004, 1 April 2005, and 1 April 2006). In some cases the EA has assigned their requisite day-to-day operational work to internal drainage boards and local authorities and in many cases the EA reassigned this to one or both types of these organisations, having previously taken on such work before the designation of the COW.

== See also ==
- Main river
- Riparian water rights
- Navigation authority
