= Severn River Authority =

Monitored river in England

The Severn River Authority was one of 27 river authorities created by the Water Resources Act 1963 (1963 C. 38). It took over the powers of the existing Severn River Board and was given additional duties to monitor water quality and protect water resources.

Under the terms of the Water Act 1973 (1973 c.37), the authority was amalgamated with the Trent River Authority, along with the water supply, sewerage and sewage disposal functions, exercised by local authorities within their areas to form the Severn Trent Water Authority in 1974.

== Area ==
The area covered by the Severn River Authority was the whole catchment area of the River Severn. It was the second-largest in area after the Yorkshire River Authority.

Although much of the catchment was in England, the Authority also exercised its powers, including flood defence, in the headwaters of the river in Wales.

The major cities within the authority's area included Gloucester, Worcester and Hereford.

== Organisation ==
The authority was constituted by Order of the Minister of Housing and Local Government dated 18 June 1964.
