= John Elfed Jones =

Welsh businessman and language activist (born 1933)

John Elfed Jones CBE
- Born: John Elfed Jones; 19 March 1933 (age 93)
- Education: Denbighshire Technical College; Heriot-Watt College
- Occupations: Businessman, engineer, language activist
- Known for: Chair of the Welsh Water Authority (1982–1989); Chair of the Welsh Language Board (1988–1993)
- Notable work: Dyfroedd Dyfnion (2013)
- Awards: CBE (1987)

John Elfed Jones CBE (born 19 March 1933) is a Welsh businessman and language activist, who has held the chairmanships of several public bodies in Wales.

== Early life and education ==
John Elfed Jones was born on 19 March 1933, the son of Urien Maelgwyn Jones and Mary Jones. He was brought up in Maentwrog, where his father worked as a manager for the North Wales Power Company.

He was educated at Blaenau Ffestiniog Grammar School and at Denbighshire Technical College, Wrexham, before studying at Heriot Watt College in Edinburgh.

He joined the Central Electricity Generating Board (CEGB) as a student apprentice (1949–1953), where he was a graduate trainee from 1953 to 1955. Following national service in the RAF, where he was commissioned as a flying officer, he rejoined the CEGB in 1957.

== Career ==
Jones followed his father into the North Wales Power Company, initially as a technical engineer. He was deputy project manager for the development of the Rheidol hydro-electric power station and worked at the Trawsfynydd nuclear power station before becoming deputy manager of the mid-Wales group of power stations.

Jones left the CEGB when the only promotion opportunities would have involved a move to England. In 1967 he joined Anglesey Aluminium as an engineering manager, and was promoted to Deputy Managing Director in 1977.

From 1979 to 1982 Jones was Industrial Director at the Welsh Office in Cardiff. In 1982, he was appointed Chair of the Welsh Water Authority and oversaw its privatisation in 1989 to form Welsh Water. In 1988, he became Chair of the Welsh Language Board. He left the role in 1993 and in 1997 he became Chair of the National Assembly's Advisory Group.

From 1996 to 2006 Jones was chairman of International Greetings plc, a major manufacturer of gift wrapping paper, greetings cards and Christmas crackers whose main factory was at Hirwaun near Aberdare.

== Controversy ==
Jones' involvement in the publicly owned Welsh Water Authority was later criticised by Rhodri Morgan, then the First Minister of Wales, and by others because of the incentives package that accompanied his role.

In 2001, Jones wrote an article in the Welsh-language magazine Barn, which was widely criticised for likening "outsiders" coming into Wales to an outbreak of "human foot-and-mouth disease". The Welsh Labour Party responded that discouraging people who didn't speak Welsh from moving to certain areas would neither protect nor promote the Welsh language. As a result of his comments, he was one of two Welsh-speaking officials reported to the Commission for Racial Equality by journalist Ian Skidmore.

== Honours and distinctions ==
Jones was awarded a CBE in the 1987 New Year Honours.

Jones's portrait, by Peter Douglas Edwards, is displayed at the Founder's Library in the University of Wales Trinity Saint David at Lampeter, of which he was president in 1992–1998. His autobiography, Dyfroedd Dyfnion, was published by Y Lolfa in 2013.
