= Water Act 1973 =

Act of the Parliament of the United Kingdom

Water Act 1973 (Note: Section 40(1).)
- Act of Parliament
- Parliament of the United Kingdom
- Long title: An Act to make provision for a national policy for water, for the conferring and discharge of functions as to water (including sewerage and sewage disposal, fisheries and land drainage) and as to recreation and amenity in connection with water, for the making of charges by water authorities and other statutory water undertakers, and for connected purposes.
- Citation: 1973 c. 37
- Introduced by: Geoffrey Rippon (Commons)
- Territorial extent: England and Wales (Note: Section 40(4) and 40(5).)

Dates
- Royal assent: 18 July 1973
- Commencement: 1 April 1974 (Note: Section 39.)

Other legislation
- Amends: Rivers (Prevention of Pollution) Act 1951; Town Development Act 1952; Public Health Act 1961; Water Resources Act 1963; London Government Act 1963
- Repeals/revokes: Rural Water Supplies and Sewerage Act 1961
- Amended by: Local Government Act 1974; House of Commons Disqualification Act 1975; Salmon and Freshwater Fisheries Act 1975; Land Drainage Act 1976; Statute Law (Repeals) Act 1977; Interpretation Act 1978; Highways Act 1980; New Towns Act 1981; Water Act 1983; Building Act 1984; Local Government Act 1985; Public Utility Transfers and Water Charges Act 1988; Water Act 1989; Planning (Consequential Provisions) Act 1990; Water Consolidation (Consequential Provisions) Act 1991

Status: Partially repealed

Text of statute as originally enacted

Revised text of statute as amended

Text of the Water Act 1973 as in force today (including any amendments) within the United Kingdom, from legislation.gov.uk.

The Water Act 1973 (c. 37) is an act of the Parliament of the United Kingdom that reorganised the water, sewage and river management industry in England and Wales. Water supply and sewage disposal were removed from local authority control, and ten larger regional water authorities were set up, under state control based on the areas of super-sets of river authorities which were also subsumed into the new authorities. Each regional water authority consisted of members appointed by the Secretary of State for the Environment, and by the various local authorities in its area.

The act also established a National Water Council. This body consisted of a chairman nominated by the minister, the chairmen of each regional authority and not more than ten additional members nominated by the government. The Council's duties included implementing national water policy, assisting the ten regional authorities in matters of joint concern, and setting and enforcing national regulations and byelaws on water quality and conservation.

== Background ==
The 1973 act was another step towards an integrated policy of water management, which like much of the previous legislation, was restricted to England and Wales, with Northern Ireland and Scotland being specifically excluded. The concept of a unified authority with responsibility for all of the water-related functions within a river basin or series of river basins was not new. The 6th Duke of Richmond introduced a river conservancy bill into Parliament in 1878, and the Council of the Society of Arts was prepared to award medals to those who could devise suitable watershed districts to aid such conservancy. Frederick Toplis received a silver medal for his plan to create 12 watershed districts, each run by commissioners, who would have powers to acquire all of the waterworks within their area, and to manage both them and the rivers for water supply and the prevention of flooding and pollution. He saw the need for each to be supported by competent legal advisers and engineers. His watershed districts were remarkably similar to the water authorities created under the 1973 A act, but quite different to those of the other five entrants whose plans were also published at the time. The only bodies which were responsible for a range of water management functions were the Thames Conservancy, created in 1857, and the Lee Conservancy Board, created in 1868.

The first moves towards more widespread management of river basins in England and Wales were enshrined in the Land Drainage Act 1930, which although primarily concerned with land drainage to prevent flooding, created catchment boards. These were responsible for the management of main rivers, and each was based around a river basin or group of river basins. Because of the emphasis on land drainage, they did not cover the whole of England and Wales, but this changed in 1948, when the River Boards Act 1948 (11 & 12 Geo. 6. c. 32) created 32 river boards. They inherited the powers of the catchment boards where they existed, and took over responsibility for flood prevention from local authorities where they did not. The river boards had additional responsibilities concerning fisheries, the prevention of pollution and the gauging of rivers, to record flows and levels. They were in turn replaced by 27 river authorities following the passing of the Water Resources Act 1963, each with additional duties to monitor water quality and protect water resources.

In parallel with these developments, the Water Act 1945 (8 & 9 Geo. 6. c. 42) had marked the start of a national water supply policy. It had recognised the need for central government to supervise the statutory suppliers of water, and to be involved in the difficult issues of water supply. It had also recognised that the supply of water to non-domestic consumers was part of an integrated policy, and had introduced the concept of abstraction licensing. In many areas, pollution of rivers by sewage was a serious problem, resulting from rapid expansion of population, and little incentive to invest in sewage treatment works. The Rivers (Prevention of Pollution) Act 1951 (14 & 15 Geo. 6. c. 64) introduced discharge licensing, and with extra powers from a similar Act of 1961, tried to encourage local authorities to invest more in such works, but the Working Party on Sewage Disposal, which reported in 1970, concluded that there were over 3,000 sewage treatment works which were performing inadequately.

== List of water authorities ==
Water authority	Former river authority areas
Anglian Water Authority	East Suffolk and Norfolk, Great Ouse, Lincolnshire, Welland and Nene river authorities, and most of Essex River Authority
Northumbrian Water Authority	Northumbrian River Authority
North West Water Authority	Cumberland, Lancashire, and Mersey and Weaver river authorities
Severn-Trent Water Authority	Trent River Authority, and most of the Severn River Authority
Southern Water Authority	Isle of Wight, Hampshire, and Sussex river authorities, and most of the Kent River Authority
South West Water Authority	Cornwall and Devon river authorities
Thames Water Authority	Thames Catchment Area, the Lee Catchment Area, the London excluded area, part of the Essex River Authority, and part of the Kent River Authority
Welsh National Water Development Authority	Dee and Clwyd, Glamorgan, Gwynedd, South West Wales, Usk and Wye river authorities
Wessex Water Authority	Bristol Avon, and Somerset river authorities, part of the Avon and Dorset River Authority, and part of the Severn River Authority
Yorkshire Water Authority	Yorkshire River Authority

== Bibliography ==
- Porter, Elizabeth (1978). Water Management in England and Wales. Cambridge University Press. ISBN 978-0-521-21865-8.
- Wisdom, A S (1966). Land Drainage. London: Sweet & Maxwell.
