= List of statutory instruments of the United Kingdom, 1961 =

This is an incomplete list of statutory instruments of the United Kingdom in 1961.

== Statutory instruments ==
=== 1-499 ===
- Sovereign Base Areas of Akrotiri and Dhekelia (Appeals to Privy Council) Order in Council 1961 (SI 1961/59)
- National Insurance (Non-participation-Benefits and Schemes) Amendment Regulations 1961 (SI 1961/137)
- Cotswold Water Board Order 1961 (SI 1961/187)
- Sheffield Water Order 1961 (SI 1961/231)
- Food (Meat Inspection) (Scotland) Regulations 1961 (SI 1961/243)
- Evidence by Certificate Rules 1961 (SI 1961/248) (L. 3)
- South Derbyshire Water Board Order 1961 (SI 1961/281)
- National Insurance (Modification of the Royal Naval Pension Scheme) Regulations 1961 (SI 1961/294)
- National Insurance (Modification of Electricity Superannuation Schemes) Regulations 1961 (SI 1961/306)
- National Insurance (Modification of Gas Superannuation Schemes) Regulations 1961 (SI 1961/307)
- Superannuation (English Local Government and Jersey) Interchange Rules 1961 (SI 1961/316)
- Anglo-Norwegian Sea Fisheries Order 1961 (SI 1961/342)
- Shipbuilding (Air Receivers) Order 1961 (SI 1961/430)
- Lincoln and District Water Board Order 1961 (SI 1961/441)
- Airways Corporations (General Staff, Pilots and Officers Pensions) (Amendment) Regulations 1961 (SI 1961/445)

=== 500-999 ===
- National Insurance (Graduated Retirement Benefit and Consequential Provisions) Regulations 1961 (SI 1961/557)
- National Insurance (Modification of Transport Undertaking Superannuation Funds) Regulation 1961 (SI 1961/559)
- Double Taxation Relief (Taxes on Income) (Faroe Islands) Order 1961 (SI 1961/579)
- Visiting Forces and Allied Headquarters (Income Tax and Death Duties) (Designation) Order 1961 (SI 1961/580)
- Visiting Forces and Allied Headquarters (Stamp Duties) (Designation) Order 1961 (SI 1961/581)
- National Insurance and Industrial Injuries (Turkey) Order 1961 (SI 1961/584)
- Foreign Compensation (Czechoslovakia) (Registration) (Amendment) Order 1961 (SI 1961/585)
- Industrial Assurance (Premium Receipt Books) (Amendment) Regulations 1961 (SI 1961/597)
- Calderdale Water Board Order 1961 (SI 1961/623)
- Gambia (Appeals to Privy Council) Order in Council 1961 (SI 1961/744)
- Livestock Rearing Land Improvement Grants (Increase of Aggregate Maximum) Order 1961 (SI 1961/869)
- Irvine and District Water Board Order 1961 (SI 1961/872)
- Telephone Amendment (No. 1) Regulations 1961 (SI 1961/873)
- Trunk Roads (Ormskirk and Aughton) (40 m.p.h. Speed Limit) Order 1961 (SI 1961/896)
- National Insurance (Modification of Trustee Savings Banks Pensions) Regulations 1961 (SI 1961/910)

=== 1000-1499 ===
- Charities (Exception of Certain Charities for Boy Scouts and Girl Guides from Registration) Regulations 1961 (SI 1961/1044)
- National Insurance (Modification of Superannuation Provisions) (Assistant Clerks of Assize) Regulations 1961 (SI 1961/1083)
- Scarborough Water Order 1961 (SI 1961/1151)
- Family Allowances, National Insurance and Industrial Injuries (Germany) Order 1959 (SI 1961/1202)
- Nurses Agencies Regulations 1961 (SI 1961/1214)
- Wakefield and District Water Board Order 1961 (SI 1961/1299)
- Breathing Apparatus, Etc. (Report on Examination) Order 1961 (SI 1961/1345)
- Superannuation (National Assistance Board) Transfer (Amendment) Rules 1961 (SI 1961/1376)
- National Insurance (Non-participation-Assurance of Equivalent Pension Benefits) Amendment Regulations 1961 (SI 1961/1378)
- Trunk Roads (40 m.p.h. Speed Limit Direction) (No. 14) Order 1961 (SI 1961/1384)
- Pontefract, Google and Selby Water Board Order 1961 (SI 1961/1447)
- Overseas Service Superannuation Order 1961 (SI 1961/1494)

=== 1500-1999 ===
- Merchant Shipping (Confirmation of Legislation) (Federation of Rhodesia and Nyasaland) Order 1961 (SI 1961/1509)
- Visiting Forces (Designation) Order 1961 (SI 1961/1511)
- National Insurance (Germany) Order 1961 (SI 1961/1513)
- Merchant Shipping (Registration of Ships) (Highlands and Islands Shipping Services) Order 1961 (SI 1961/1514)
- Temporary Importation (Commercial Vehicles and Aircraft) Regulations 1961 (SI 1961/1523)
- Act of Sederunt (Legal Aid Rules) (Amendment) 1961 (SI 1961/1549)
- Construction (General Provisions) Regulations 1961 (SI 1961/1580)
- Construction (Lifting Operations) Regulations 1961 (SI 1961/1581)
- Hopton Mine (Locomotives and Diesel Vehicles) Special Regulations 1961 (SI 1961/1583)
- Trunk Roads (Clayton-le-Woods and Whittle-le-Woods) (40 m.p.h. Speed Limit) Order 1961 (SI 1961/1664)
- Criminal Justice Act 1961 (Commencement No. 1) Order 1961 (SI 1961/1672)
- Cocklakes Mine (Locomotives and Diesel Vehicles) Special Regulations 1961 (SI 1961/1769)
- Long Meg Mine (Locomotives and Diesel Vehicles) Special Regulations 1961 (SI 1961/1774)
- Superannuation (Imperial Forestry Institute and Civil Service) Transfer Rules 1961 (SI 1961/1775)
- Superannuation (Low Temperature Research Station and Civil Service) Transfer Rules 1961 (SI 1961/1776)
- Superannuation (Pest Infestation Laboratory and Civil Service) Transfer Rules 1961 (SI 1961/1777)
- Foreign Compensation (Roumania) Order 1961 (SI 1961/1832)
- Family Allowances, National Insurance and Industrial Injuries (European Interim Agreement) Amendment Order 1961 (SI 1961/1833)
- National Insurance (European Interim Agreement) Amendment Order 1961 (SI 1961/1834)
- Barnsley Water Order 1961 (SI 1961/1877)

=== 2000-2469 ===
- Distribution of German Enemy Property (No. 4) Order 1961 (SI 1961/2030)
- Admiralty Jurisdiction (Virgin Islands) Order in Council 1961 (SI 1961/2033)
- Television Act 1954 (Channel Islands) Order 1961 (SI 1961/2039)
- Evidence (Bahamas) Order 1961 (SI 1961/2041)
- Evidence (Bermuda) Order 1961 (SI 1961/2042)
- Evidence (British Guiana) Order 1961 (SI 1961/2043)
- Evidence (British Honduras) Order 1961 (SI 1961/2044)
- Evidence (Dominica) Order 1961 (SI 1961/2045)
- Evidence (Fiji) Order 1961 (SI 1961/2046)
- Evidence (Gibraltar) Order 1961 (SI 1961/2047)
- Evidence (Mauritius) Order 1961 (SI 1961/2048)
- Evidence (St. Helena) Order 1961 (SI 1961/2049)
- Evidence (Sarawak) Order 1961 (SI 1961/2050)
- Evidence (Tanganyika) Order 1961 (SI 1961/2051)
- Evidence (Uganda) Order 1961 (SI 1961/2052)
- Evidence (Zanzibar) Order 1961 (SI 1961/2053)
- Barnsley Water (Cranberry Holes) Order 1961 (SI 1961/2057)
- Betting and Gaming Act 1960 (Commencement No. 2) Order 1961 (SI 1961/2092)
- National Insurance (Non-participation-Certificates) Amendment Regulations 1961 (SI 1961/2176)
- Cambridge Waterworks Order 1961 (SI 1961/2192)
- Rugby Joint Water Board Order 1961 (SI 1961/2193)
- East Anglian Water Order 1962 (SI 1961/2291)
- Nene and Ouse Water Board Order 1961 (SI 1961/2328)
- Whaling Industry (Ship) (Amendment) Regulations 1961 (SI 1961/2336)
- Kesteven Water Board Order 1961 (SI 1961/2349)
- East Yorkshire (Wolds Area) Water Board Order 1961 (SI 1961/2399)
- Board of Inquiry (Army) (Amendment) Rules 1961 (SI 1961/2469)

== See also ==
- List of statutory instruments of the United Kingdom
