= Ian Skidmore =

Ian Edward Skidmore (16 May 1929 – 3 October 2013) was an English-born writer and broadcaster who spent most of his career in Wales, and became best known as a presenter on BBC Radio Wales and BBC Radio 4.

He was born in Manchester, the son of a policeman, Edward Skidmore, and his wife Irene. He attended Didsbury Central school until he and his mother were evacuated to Derbyshire during the Second World War. He obtained a printer's apprenticeship on the Evening Chronicle and then did National Service. As a sergeant in the 7th Armoured Division, he was sent to Germany in 1948 to cover the Berlin Airlift and began broadcasting on British Forces Radio.

His career as a journalist included periods on the Manchester City News, the Yorkshire Evening Post, the Liverpool Daily Dispatch and the Manchester Daily Mirror. He later worked as a junior editor on the News of the World, Daily Mirror, Sunday Pictorial, Sunday Mirror and Sunday People. He also covered the Moors Murders as a freelance reporter, while running his own agency in Chester. He and his first wife, Leah, were divorced, and in 1971 he relocated to Anglesey with his second wife Celia, who was also a journalist. There they were neighbours of the artist Kyffin Williams, about whom Skidmore later wrote a book. In his spare time, Skidmore became a collector of rare books.

The spoof Radio Brynsiencyn, which he co-presented with his wife Celia, was broadcast twice a week on BBC Radio Wales. He helped train the young Aled Jones in the skills of radio presenting.

In 1998 he received a Golden Microphone award for his work with the BBC in Wales, but he was later dropped by Radio Wales. He claimed that this was because he did not sound Welsh enough. In 2001, he reported two Welsh nationalists, including John Elfed Jones, to the Commission for Racial Equality, claiming that their comments about the English were tantamount to racism. In retirement, he and his wife moved to March in Cambridgeshire, where he died aged 84.

== Radio ==
- In Conversation (1978-1993)
- Meet for Lunch
- Radio Brynsiencyn
- Times Remembered (1987)

== Works ==
- Escape from the Rising Sun: The Incredible Voyage of the Sederhana Djohanis
- Lifeboat V.C.: Story of Coxswain Dick Evans, B.E.M. and His Many Rescues (1979)
- Owain Glyndwr, Prince of Wales (1978)
- Forgive Us Our Press Passes (autobiography; 1983)
- Gwynedd (1986)
- Kyffin: A Figure in the Welsh Landscape (2008)
