= Affinity Water =

Company in Hatfield, United Kingdom

Affinity Water Limited
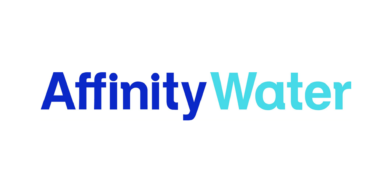
- Formerly: Lee Valley Water Limited (1990–1994); Three Valleys Water plc (1994–2009); Veolia Water Central plc (1 July 2009); Veolia Water Central Limited (2009–2012)
- Type: Limited company
- Industry: Water industry
- Founded: 1 October 2012
- Headquarters: Hatfield, Hertfordshire
- Area served: Parts of London, eastern and south eastern England
- Key people: Mike Brown (Chairman); Mark Garth (CEO)
- Products: Drinking water
- Production output: 965 Ml per day of drinking water (2026)
- Services: Water supply
- Revenue: ▲£438.3 million (2026); £363.6 million (2025)
- Operating income: ▲£74.7 million (2026); £33.2 million (2025)
- Net income: ▲ -£6.2 million (2026); -£16.8 million (2025)
- Owner: Consortium of Allianz (36.6%), HICL (36.6%) and DIF Tamblin (26.9%)
- Number of employees: 1,552 (2026)
- Website: affinitywater.co.uk

Affinity Water Limited is a UK supplier of drinking water to 4.06 million people in parts of London, eastern and south eastern England. The company is owned by a consortium of Allianz, HICL and DIF Tamblin.

== History ==
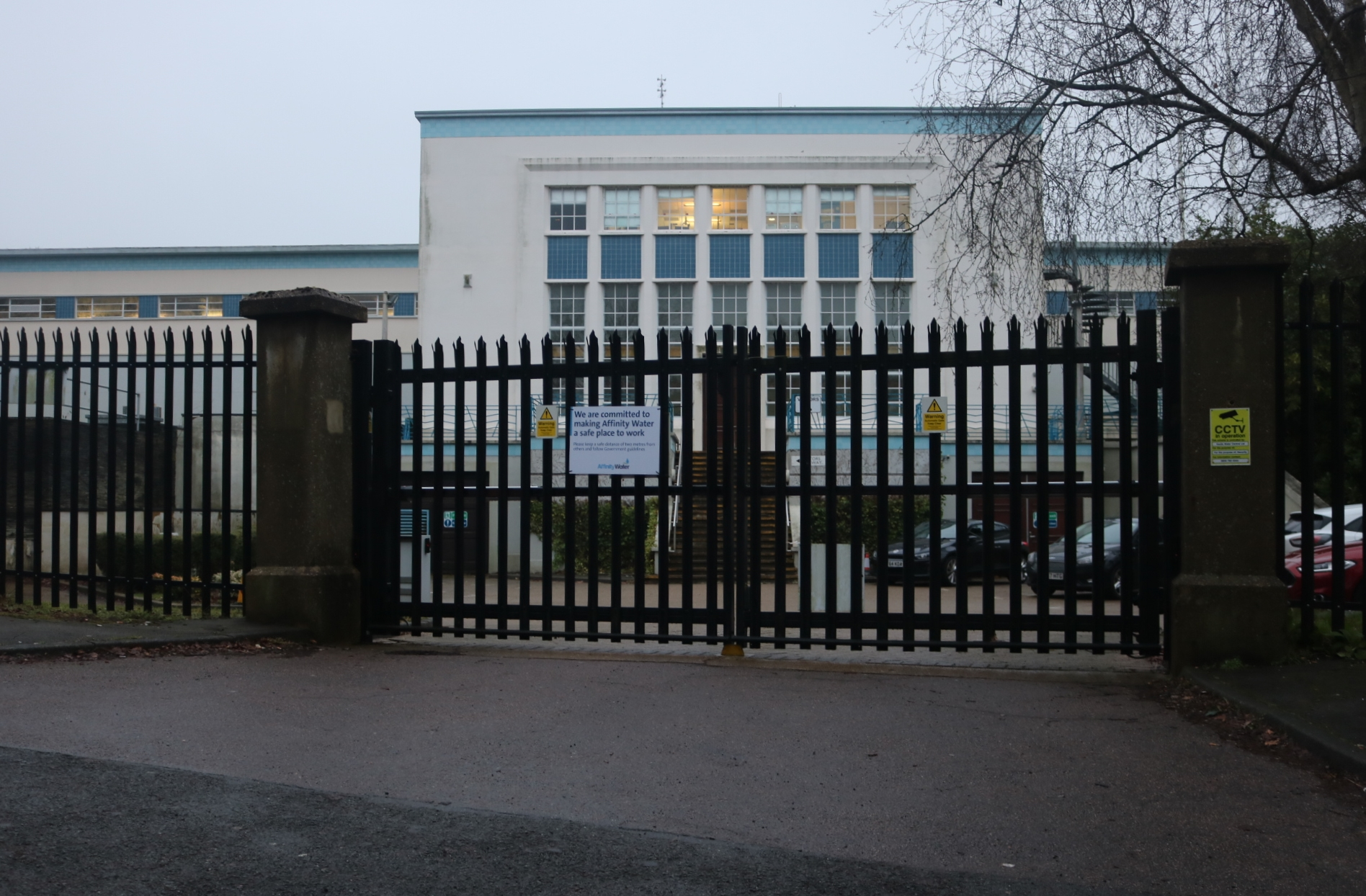
Waterworks in Hertfordshire

Affinity Water was established through the purchase of Veolia Water's UK water supply operations by Rift Acquisitions, an entity established by Morgan Stanley and M&G Investments, for £1.2 billion on 28 June 2012. The three separate Veolia Water-branded businesses: Veolia Water Central, Veolia Water Southeast and Veolia Water East were brought together as one company, under the Affinity Water brand on 1 October 2012.

Veolia Environment retained a 10% stake in Affinity Water for five years from incorporation, using the proceeds of the disposal to reduce its debt, as part of a €5bn debt-reduction programme announced in December 2011.

In May 2017, a consortium of Allianz, HICL Infrastructure and DIF purchased Morgan Stanley and M&G's 90% holding, followed by Veolia's 10% holding.

== Supply area ==
Affinity Water supplies three geographically distinct regions of England. The Central region serves parts of Bedfordshire, Buckinghamshire, Essex, Greater London, Hertfordshire and Surrey. The East region serves part of Essex. The Southeast region serves part of Kent. They operate 17,070 km of water mains.

== Campaigns ==
In 2019, Affinity Water launched their #WhyNotWater campaign. This aimed to solve the upcoming shortfall between supply and demand. The program intended to achieve this by pushing for mandatory water efficiency labels on appliances, giving tenants rights to demand water efficient appliances and enforcing domestic water efficiency through the use of mandatory certifications.

In April 2021, Affinity Water launched their Save our Streams program. It aimed to reduce customer demand by offering free water saving devices, such as a low flow shower head or tap aerators. They aimed to encourage consumer behaviour through educational visits to school as well as being present on the high street to remind customers that the water is being taken from the environment. They used radio and TV adverts to convey the message. They had a target of 120,000 sign ups by the end of the 2022 financial year, reaching 191,000 in the end. The campaign saved over 21 million litres of water a day in 2022. In 2022, Ben Fogle joined the campaign, helping advertise the program.

== Compulsory metering ==
Under the Water Industry Act 1991, water companies are permitted to install water meters to domestic properties on a compulsory basis if the area is deemed to be in serious water stress. Affinity Water's region is deemed as being in serious water stress, meaning they are permitted to meter domestic properties. They aim to install 280,000 meters to households. This would lead to 80% of customers being metered in 2025 and 90% of sites by 2045. This is being delivered at the cost of £59m. They are starting the program by focusing on key areas in their catchment. These areas were selected due to their high water demand and lack of available resources. Key areas are Harlow, Hatfield, Northolt, Staines, Egham and Chertsey. Once customers have a meter fitted, they are given 2 years to switch over to metered billing, whilst receiving 2 bills to gain an estimate of the cost.

The water metering program is estimated to reduce demand by 18% for metered customers, which alongside projects to increase available storage is expected to provide enough water for customers as climate change threatens supply.

== Environmental controversy ==
In the summer of 2022, Affinity Water ran half the River Ver dry due to abstracting too much water. 6 miles out of the 17-mile length were considered as dry. Affinity Water abstract nearly 10 million litres of water each day from the river. The firm published a statement saying it is committed to reducing the amount it takes from the environment.
