= Veolia Water East =

British water company

Coordinates: 51.943189°N 1.028174°E

- Company type: Subsidiary
- Industry: Water supply, water treatment and sewage treatment
- Predecessor: Tendring Hundred Water
- Founded: 1989
- Defunct: 2012 (merged into Affinity Water)
- Headquarters: Mill Hill, Manningtree
- Area served: Tendring peninsula
- Parent: Veolia Environnement (through Veolia Water)
- Website: east.veoliawater.co.uk

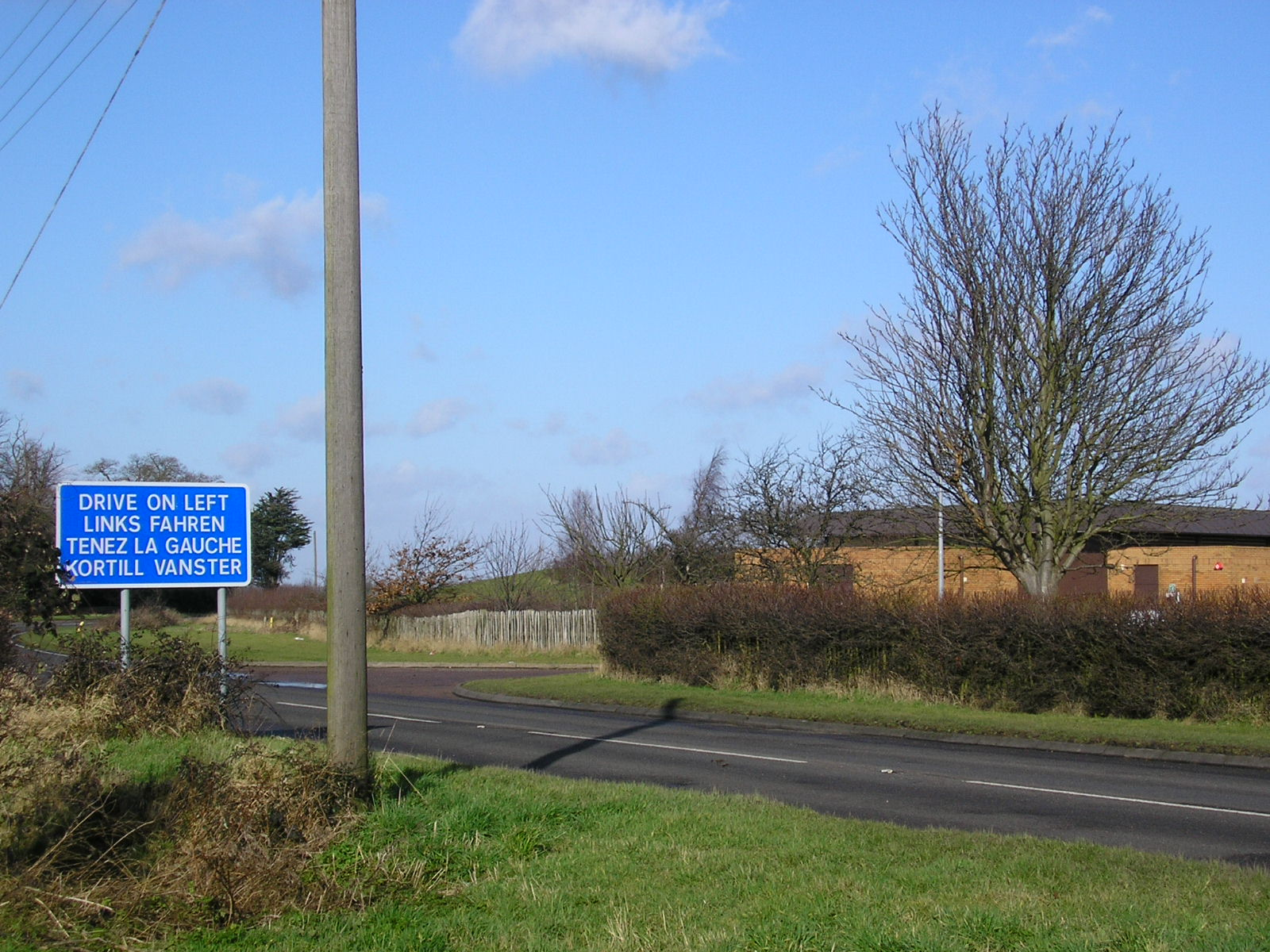
The company's main treatment works are on the right

Veolia Water East, formerly known as Tendring Hundred Water Services, and originally the Tendring Hundred Waterworks Company, was a privately owned company supplying water in the eastern United Kingdom. It supplied water to the Tendring peninsula in north east Essex within an area of 352 square kilometres (136 sq mi). In July 2009, the company, a subsidiary of Veolia Water UK since 1989, part of Veolia Environment, changed its name from Tendring Hundred Water.

The company was originally incorporated by the Tendring Hundred Waterworks Act 1884 (47 & 48 Vict. c. ccxlvi).

In 2012, following the sale of Veolia Water's UK water supply business, it was merged with Veolia Water Southeast and Veolia Water Central to form Affinity Water on 1 October 2012.

== See also ==
- Waste management
- Water privatization
- Water supply
