= River authority =

River authorities controlled land drainage, fisheries and river pollution in rivers, streams and inland waters in England and Wales between 1965 and 1973.

== Background ==
A royal commission, with Lord Bledisloe acting as its chairman, reported on the state of land drainage legislation covering England and Wales on 5 December 1927. It concluded that existing laws were "vague and ill-defined, full of anomalies, obscure, lacking in uniformity, and even chaotic." It recommended the creation of catchment boards with responsibility for main rivers, and formed the basis for the Land Drainage Act 1930, although only 47 of the 100 catchment boards suggested by the commission were enshrined in the legislation.

The River Boards Act 1948 sought to establish river boards throughout the whole of England and Wales, with overall responsibility for land drainage, fisheries and river pollution. Thirty-two river boards inherited the functions of the existing catchment boards, or took over the flood prevention functions on main rivers from local authorities where no catchment board existed. The exceptions were the River Thames Catchment Board and the Lee Conservancy Catchment Board, which continued to exist under the powers of the 1930 act.

== Water Resources Act 1963 ==
River authorities were created by the Water Resources Act 1963 (c. 38), which became law on 31 July 1963. Under its provisions, twenty-seven river authorities replaced the 32 river boards on 1 April 1965, and the 1948 act was repealed. The new authorities took over the powers of the existing river boards, and were given additional duties to monitor water quality and protect water resources. They thus became responsible for inland waters and the underground strata which existed within their area. The act made special provision for the River Thames and Lee Conservancy catchment boards, enabling them to act as if they were river authorities and their catchment areas were river authority areas. There was also special provision for parts of London, defined as the London excluded area under section 125 of the act.

For the twenty-seven authorities, the members were partly nominated by local authorities and partly appointed by the government. Each authority normally consisted of between 21 and 31 members, although more could be specified in particular cases by the minister issuing the establishing order for the authority. Local authorities could appoint sufficient members so that they just had a majority. The remainder were appointed by the Minister for Agriculture, Fisheries and Food, and consisted of people who had expertise in land drainage or sea defences, fisheries, agriculture, public water supply, and industry other than agriculture. The areas of the authorities were in most cases defined by reference to maps held by the river boards they replaced.

River authority	River board areas
The Avon and Dorset River Authority	The Avon and Dorset River Board area
The Bristol Avon River Authority	The Bristol Avon River Board area
The Cornwall River Authority	The Cornwall River Board area
The Cumberland River Authority	The Cumberland River Board area
The Dee and Clwyd River Authority	The Dee and Clwyd River Board area
The Devon River Authority	The Devon River Board area
The East Suffolk and Norfolk River Authority	The East Suffolk and Norfolk River Board area
The Essex River Authority	The Essex River Board area
The Glamorgan River Authority	The Glamorgan River Board area
The Great Ouse River Authority	The Great Ouse River Board area
The Gwynedd River Authority	The Gwynedd River Board area
The Hampshire River Authority	The Hampshire River Board area
The Isle of Wight River Authority	The Isle of Wight River Board area
The Kent River Authority	The Kent River Board area
The Lancashire River Authority	The Lancashire River Board area
The Lincolnshire River Authority	The Lincolnshire River Board area
The Mersey and Weaver River Authority	The Mersey River Board area and the Cheshire River Board area
The Northumbrian River Authority.	The Northumberland and Tyneside River Board area and the Wear and Tees River Board area
The Severn River Authority	The Severn River Board area
The Somerset River Authority	The Somerset River Board area
The South West Wales River Authority	The South West Wales River Board area
The Sussex River Authority	The East Sussex River Board area and the West Sussex River Board area
The Trent River Authority	The Trent River Board area
The Usk River Authority	The Usk River Board area
The Welland and Nene River Authority	The Welland River Board area and the Nene River Board area
The Wye River Authority	The Wye River Board area
The Yorkshire Ouse and Hull River Authority	The Hull and East Yorkshire River Board area and the Yorkshire Ouse River Board area

The river authorities were abolished on 1 April 1974, with their powers and duties passing to regional water authorities established by the Water Act 1973.

== Bibliography ==
- Anon (10 December 1932). "Land Drainage". Nature. 130 (3293): 875. Bibcode:1932Natur.130Q.875.. doi:10.1038/130875a0.
- Dobson, Alban; Hull, Hubert (1931). The Land Drainage Act 1930. Oxford University Press.
- HMSO (1963). "Water Resources Act 1963" (PDF). legislation.gov.uk.
- Legislation (1973). "Water Act 1973". legislation.gov.uk.
- Wisdom, A S (1966). Land Drainage. London: Sweet & Maxwell.
