= Regional water authority =

Water supply authority in the UK, 1974–1989

A regional water authority, commonly known as a water board, was one of a group of public bodies that came into existence in England and Wales in April 1974, as a result of the Water Act 1973 coming into force. This brought together in ten regional units a diverse range of bodies involved in water treatment and supply, sewage disposal, land drainage, river pollution and fisheries. They lasted until 1989, when the water industry was privatised and the water supply and sewerage and sewage disposal parts became companies and the regulatory arm formed the National Rivers Authority. Regional water authorities were also part of the Scottish water industry when three bodies covering the North, West and East of Scotland were created in 1996, to take over responsibilities for water supply and sewage treatment from the regional councils, but they only lasted until 2002, when they were replaced by the publicly owned Scottish Water.

== Background ==
The idea of organising water management into regions based on river catchments had been around for nearly 100 years, since the Duke of Richmond had introduced a bill in Parliament on 7 March 1879 with the title Rivers Conservancy, promoting the idea that "the catchment area of each river should, as far as practicable, be placed under a single body of conservators". The council of the Society of Arts had offered to award medals for plans to divide England and Wales into watershed districts, to assist in the conservancy of natural resources. The silver medal was awarded to Frederick Toplis in 1879, whose twelve watershed districts cover remarkably similar areas to those established under the Water Act 1973. However, the idea was not pursued at the time, but from the 1930s, the idea took shape.

First came catchment boards, created by the Land Drainage Act 1930. While they were primarily concerned with land drainage and the prevention of flooding, they paved the way for river boards, which were established in 1948, and covered the whole of England and Wales. As well as land drainage, they were responsible for fisheries, the prevention of pollution and the gauging of rivers. River boards were replaced by twenty-seven river authorities as a result of the Water Resources Act 1963, and they gained further responsibilities, covering the monitoring of water quality and the protection of water resources. They thus became responsible for inland waters, coastal waters and the underground strata which existed within their area. Sewerage boards had been largely responsible for sewage collection and disposal in areas defined by local authority boundaries and water supply had been managed by quasi-regional water boards.

== Authorities ==
With the establishment of the water authorities in April 1974, England and Wales had, for the first time, organisations which were responsible for all aspects of the management of water within a geographical region, defined by a river basin or a series of river basins. As well as the management of water resources, which they inherited from the river authorities, they were also responsible for water supply and the disposal of effluent. Most uses of water are interconnected, since the removal of water from a river for spray irrigation reduces the amount of water available for drinking water supply, and the pollution of a river by sewage prevents such a use. Most drinking water supplies had been managed by local authorities, but the Central Advisory Water Committee, which reported in 1971, had found that this system was inflexible, and the new water authorities took over 157 water supply undertakings from local authorities and joint water boards. Some thirty independent water supply companies remained, but operated under agency agreements with the new bodies.

The treatment and disposal of sewage was also removed from the local authorities and given to the regional water authorities. The Working Party on Sewage Disposal, which reported in 1970, had suggested that there were over 3,000 treatment plants which were producing sub-standard effluent discharges. Over many years there had been little incentive to improve the quality of treatment, but the water authorities were given the task. Some 1,400 sewage authorities were divided among the ten water authorities, as it was recognised that the discharge of treated effluent was a major element in the total hydrologic system.

The ten new authorities were:

- Anglian Water Authority – The areas of the East Suffolk and Norfolk, Essex, Great Ouse, Lincolnshire and Welland and Nene river authorities, except the part of the area of the Essex River Authority which is included in the area of the Thames Water Authority
- North West Water Authority – The areas of the Cumberland, Lancashire and Mersey and Weaver river authorities
- Northumbrian Water Authority – The area of the Northumbrian River Authority
- Severn Trent Water Authority – The areas of the Severn and Trent river authorities, except the part of the area of the Severn River Authority which was included in the area of the Wessex Water Authority.
- South West Water Authority – The areas of the Cornwall and Devon river authorities and part of the area of the Avon and Dorset River Authority.
- Southern Water Authority – The Isle of Wight and the areas of the Hampshire, Kent and Sussex river authorities, except the part of the area of the Kent River Authority which was included in the area of the Thames Water Authority.
- Thames Water Authority – The Thames Catchment Area, the Lee Catchment Area and parts of the area of the Essex River Authority and of the Kent River Authority that drained to the Thames estuary
- Welsh National Water Development Authority (WNWDA) – Including all the catchments of the Wye River Authority, the Usk River Authority, the Glamorgan River Authority, the South West Wales River Authority, the Gwynedd River Authority and the Dee and Clwyd River Authority. Parts of the WNWDA area including parts of the River Dee and the River Wye extended into England
- Wessex Water Authority – Most of the area of the Avon and Dorset, Bristol Avon and Somerset river authorities and part of the area of the Severn River Authority draining to the lower Severn estuary
- Yorkshire Water Authority – The area of the Yorkshire River Authority

Governance of the regional water authorities was by boards of governors. The Secretary of State for the Environment, or the Secretary of State for Wales in the case of the Welsh Authority, appointed the chairman, and between six and twelve other members, while two more members were appointed by the Minister of Agriculture, Fisheries and Food. The size of the board differed from authority to authority, with the smallest being 14 governors plus a chairman for Wessex Water and South West Water, and the largest being Thames Water, with over 50 members. Over half of the members were nominated by local authorities, and so the statutory appointments were normally based on technical expertise, to complement the more local interests of local authority appointments.

By the mid-1980s, the water authorities had an annual turnover of around £2,600 million, and employed some 51,000 people. Their major concern was the provision of potable water and the treatment of sewage, with environmental services occupying a much smaller part of their activities. They managed 139,000 miles (224,000 km) of water mains, 850 water treatment works, 141,000 miles (227,000 km) of sewers and 6,500 sewage treatment works.

Although all aspects of water management were under one body for each region, the new authorities still had to deal with two government departments when major capital expenditure was involved. For flood protection and land drainage schemes, the powers of the Land Drainage Act 1930 and the Land Drainage Act 1961 were largely unaltered, and the approval of the Ministry of Agriculture was required. For other capital works, it was the Department of the Environment which could sanction them. For such schemes, a regional water authority could attempt to get parliamentary approval through a private bill, but the complexities of the process meant that the preferred option was to apply for an order under the Water Act 1945. This was then dealt with by the Secretary of State for the Environment.

=== Privatisation ===
In 1989 the ten water authorities were privatised, with each becoming a water and sewerage company, and other responsibilities such as land drainage, river pollution prevention and control, and fisheries being passed to the National Rivers Authority, and subsequently the Environment Agency when that was created in 1995. Economic regulation of the new companies was initially managed by the Office of Water Services, which was renamed as the Water Services Regulation Authority in April 2006. Both bodies are informally known as Ofwat. Ofwat has four principal roles, which are to ensure that the interests of customers are protected, to set price limits, to ensure that the functions of the water and sewerage companies can be adequately financed and fulfilled, and to measure the standards of service and compliance with the conditions of their licences. The Environment Agency is responsible for maintaining and improving the quality of the environment, and aspects of this that affect the water and sewerage companies include monitoring their compliance with discharge consents, recording any pollution incidents that occur, and taking action and monitoring its effect when there is a pollution incident. Since 2013 these responsibilities in Wales have been held by Natural Resources Wales.

== Scotland ==
The Scottish water industry has followed a different path to that in England and Wales. In 1946 local authorities were mandated to provide drinking water supplies to their communities. The first major rationalisation of the system took place as a result of the Water (Scotland) Act 1967, which created 13 regional water boards, drawing together the 210 separate organisations that had been responsible for water supply in 1945. Although they worked well on a technical level, the issues of funding had not been adequately addressed. Because the cost of providing new sources of clean water was often beyond the abilities of local authorities to cope, the Central Scotland Water Development Board was also created by the act and given the responsibility of providing new sources. They would then supply the water to local authorities in bulk. With the passing of the Local Government (Scotland) Act 1973, larger regions were created, and responsibility for water supply passed to the nine regional councils of Highland, Grampian, Tayside, Fife, Lothian, Borders, Central, Strathclyde, and Dumfries and Galloway. A tenth Island Area included Shetland, Orkney and the Western Isles, although they continued to act independently. They were also given responsibility for sewage treatment, which prior to the act had been handled by 234 separate organisations. The Local Government etc. (Scotland) Act 1994 changed this system, and from April 1996 all water supply and sewerage services were provided by three publicly owned regional water authorities, the North of Scotland Water Authority, the West of Scotland Water Authority, and the East of Scotland Water Authority.

The West of Scotland Water Authority was the largest of the three, serving some 2.25 million people occupying an area of over 7,700 square miles (20,000 km^{2}), previously managed by Strathclyde and Dumfries and Galloway regional councils. This includes major cities, industrial areas and large rural tracts. Water is obtained largely from surface sources, including 13 lochs, 134 impounding reservoirs and 95 abstraction points, on streams, springs and boreholes.

The East of Scotland Water Authority supplied 1.58 million people from 107 surface water sources, which include lochs, reservoirs and rivers, and 32 groundwater sources. Its area of responsibility covered Edinburgh, the Borders, the Lothians, Fife and Kinross, the Forth Valley, and parts of North Lanarkshire and Dumbartonshire.

The North of Scotland Water Authority covered the rest of Scotland, including the Highlands, Grampian and Tayside regions on the mainland, and Orkney, Shetland and the Western Isles. The Scottish Water and Sewerage Customers' Council had an overall responsibility for monitoring water services.

The post of Water Industry Commissioner was created under part II of the Water Industry Act 1999. As the economic regulator for the water industry, and with the need to spend huge sums on investment, to meet the ever-increasing demands of water quality and sewage treatment, a study was carried out into ways to achieve economies, and identified that saving of between £100 million and £168 million could be made if the three water authorities collaborated on issues such as asset management. This led to the formulation of the Water Industry (Scotland) Bill, which would replace the three regional water authorities with a single, publicly-owned body to be known as Scottish Water, This became the Water Industry (Scotland) Act 2002. The Water Industry Commission survived the transition, and acts in a similar way to Ofwat in England and Wales.

== Bibliography ==
- Howarth, William (1987). Freshwater Fishery Law. Financial Training Publications. ISBN 978-1-85185-030-3.
- Lobina, Emanuele; Terhorst, Philipp (29 January 2005). D19: WaterTime case study – Edinburgh, UK. Watertime EU Research Project.
- Matthews, Hugh; Gardiner, Vince (1999). The Changing Geography of the UK (3rd ed.). Routledge. ISBN 978-0-415-17901-0.
- Memorandum (2001). Water Industry (Scotland) Bill Policy Memorandum (PDF). The Stationery Office (for the Scottish Parliament). ISBN 978-0-338-20231-4.
- Porter, Elizabeth (1978). Water Management in England and Wales. Cambridge University Press. ISBN 978-0-521-21865-8.
- SRM (2008). "Structure of the UK Water Industry". Water Research Centre. Archived from the original on 3 May 2017.
- Wisdom, A S (1966). Land Drainage. London: Sweet & Maxwell.
- Whitaker (2011). Whitaker's Almanac 2012 (144th ed.). Bloomsbury Publishing. ISBN 978-1-4081-3012-4.
