= Main river =

Statutory designation in England and Wales

Main rivers (Welsh: prif afonydd) are a statutory type of watercourse in England and Wales, usually larger streams and rivers, but also some smaller watercourses. A main river is designated by being marked as such on a main river map, and can include any structure or appliance for controlling or regulating the flow of water in, into or out of a main river. Every other open watercourse in England and Wales is determined by statute as an 'ordinary watercourse'.

== England ==
The Environment Agency carries out maintenance, improvement or construction work on main rivers to manage flood risk as part of its duties and powers as defined by the Flood and Water Management Act 2010. The Environment Agency's powers to carry out flood defence works apply to main rivers and the sea only; they do not apply to ordinary watercourses. The Environment Agency does not have to maintain or construct new works on main rivers or the sea and it is unlikely to maintain a watercourse to improve its amenity or to stop erosion that does not increase flood risk. Main rivers in England are designated by the Environment Agency; Defra statutory guidance, issued under section 193E of the Water Resources Act 1991, advises that the Environment Agency should classify a watercourse as a main river if it is likely to have flood consequences for significant numbers of people or properties, or if it is likely to contribute to significant flooding across the catchment.

== Wales ==
Natural Resources Wales decides which rivers are classified as main rivers, and carries out works to manage flood risk in the main river catchments.

== Map ==
The main river maps for England and Wales from the Environment Agency are freely available to the public for viewing.
