= National Rivers Authority =

British authority

- Logo of the NRA

Authority overview
- Formed: 1989
- Preceding authority: Ten regional water authorities
- Dissolved: 1996
- Superseding authority: Environment Agency

The National Rivers Authority (NRA) was one of the forerunners of the Environment Agency of England and Wales, existing between 1989 and 1996.

Before 1989 the regulation of the aquatic environment had largely been carried out by the ten regional water authorities (RWAs). The RWAs were responsible for the supply and distribution of drinking water, sewerage and sewage disposal, land drainage and flood risk management, fisheries, water quality management, pollution prevention, water resource management and many aspects of the management of aquatic ecology and some aspects of recreation. With the passing of the Water Act 1989, the ten water authorities in England and Wales were privatised by flotation on the stock market. They took the water supply, sewerage and sewage disposal activities into the privatised companies. The remaining duties remained with the newly created National Rivers Authority.

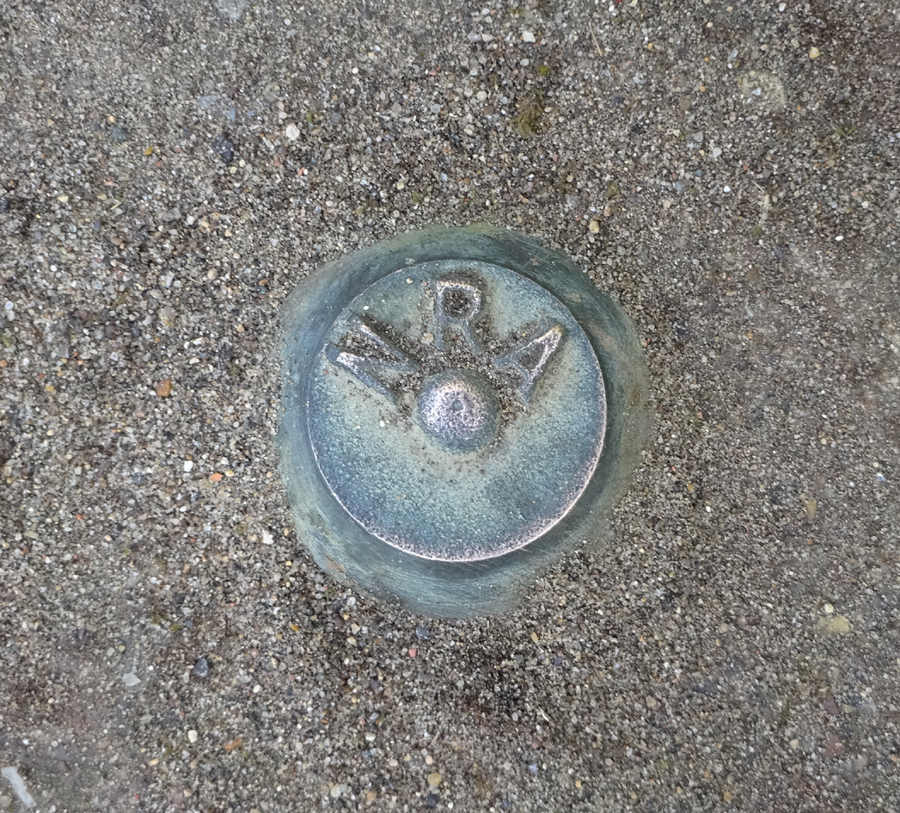
NRA rivet Bench Mark (flood level datum)

The assets and the staff of the RWAs were divided up at privatisation between the new water companies and the NRA. However, all the assets relating to water supply reservoirs were transferred to the newly created private water companies, even in those cases where there were strong recreational and fisheries interests in the reservoirs. Complex charging arrangements were also put in place whereby the newly created companies paid abstraction charges to the NRA for water removed from surface and ground waters but the NRA then had to pay to have such waters released into rivers. In circumstances where reservoirs had been built to control river flow and thus independently support drinking water abstractions, this could entail the NRA paying out more to have the water released than it had charged for its abstraction. It also meant that some releases of water from reservoirs, which in the past had been made principally for ecological or recreational interests, were now made with economic interests as the principal driver.

The logo of the NRA was a stylised image of a salmon in a circle of water, sometimes frivolously referred to by the staff of the NRA as the washing machine.

The chair of the NRA throughout its existence was Lord Crickhowell.

In 1996, the NRA ceased to exist when it was subsumed into the Environment Agency, together with HMIP Her Majesty's Inspectorate of Pollution (HMIP) and the local authority waste regulation functions. Its duties in Wales passed to Natural Resources Wales in 2013.
