= Veolia Water Central =

Former water company in England

Veolia Water Central Limited
- Company type: Subsidiary
- Industry: Water supply
- Founded: 1994 (merger of Colne, Rickmansworth and Lee Valley Water companies)
- Defunct: 2012 (merged into Affinity Water)
- Headquarters: Hatfield, England
- Key people: Richard Bienfait (Managing Director) Richard Brimble (Director of Organisation Development)
- Parent: Veolia Environnement (through Veolia Water)
- Website: central.veoliawater.co.uk

Veolia Water Central (formerly Three Valleys Water) was a privately owned company supplying water to Hertfordshire and parts of Surrey, North London and Bedfordshire, in England. It was owned by Veolia Environnement, a French company with international interests in the water, waste management, energy and transportation sectors.

== History ==
The company was formed as Three Valleys Water in 1994 by the merger of the Colne Valley, Rickmansworth and Lee Valley Water companies, which had been bought by Veolia Water UK in 1987. North Surrey Water joined the group in October 2000.

The company was renamed Veolia Water Central Limited in 2009.

Veolia Water Central was purchased by Rift Acquisitions Ltd in 2012, along with two other UK water firms owned by Veolia, and was rebranded to Affinity Water.

=== Colne Valley Water Company ===
The Colne Valley Water Company was incorporated by the Colne Valley Water Act 1873 (36 & 37 Vict. c. lxxx).

It became Colne Valley Water Company plc, and then Colne Valley Water Limited, in 1992.

=== Rickmansworth Water Company ===
The Rickmansworth Waterworks Company was incorporated by the Rickmansworth Waterworks Act 1884 (47 & 48 Vict. c. xvii).

It was renamed the Rickmansworth and Uxbridge Valley Water Company by the Rickmansworth and Uxbridge Valley Water Act 1885 (48 & 49 Vict. c. xx) to reflect an expansion in the area served.

The company was reincorporated as Rickmansworth Water plc in October 1990.

==== Amersham, Beaconsfield and District Waterworks Company ====
The Amersham, Beaconsfield and District Waterworks Company was authorised by the Amersham, Beaconsfield and District Water Order 1896 to supply water in part of Buckinghamshire. It was later merged into the Rickmansworth and Uxbridge Valley Water Company.

=== Lee Valley Water Company ===
The Lee Valley Water Company was incorporated by the Lee Valley Water Act 1959 (7 & 8 Eliz. 2. c. li). It was formed by a merger of three existing water companies, the Barnet District Water Company, the Herts and Essex Water Company, and the Royston Water Company, together with the water supply of Letchworth Garden City, Knebworth, Hertford, Stevenage, Baldock, Hitchin, Ware, Welwyn Garden City, and Braughing. The company became Lee Valley Water plc in 1992.

The Barnet District Water Company had been formed by the Barnet District Gas and Water Act 1872 (35 & 36 Vict. c. clxxxix).

The Herts and Essex Water Company was incorporated by the Herts and Essex Water Act 1953 (1 & 2 Eliz. 2. c. xi), in place of the earlier Herts and Essex Waterworks Company, first authorised to supply water by the Herts and Essex Water Order 1879.

The Royston Water Company was first authorised to supply water by the Royston Water Order 1897.

The Luton Water Company was formed by the Luton Water Act 1865 (28 & 29 Vict. c. xvii). The Lee Valley Water Company bought the copmpany in 1973.

=== North Surrey Water ===
North Surrey Water Company was formed in 1973 from four existing companies.

The Norwood (Middlesex) Waterworks Company was authorised to supply water by the Norwood (Middlesex) Water Order 1878.

The Sunningdale District Water Company was formed by the Sunningdale District Water Act 1877 (40 & 41 Vict. c. clxii).

The Norwood and Sunningdale companies combined by the South West Suburban Water Act 1883 (46 & 47 Vict. c. cxlvii) into the South West Suburban Water Company.

It absorbed the Woking and District Water Company by the North Surrey Water Order 1973 (SI 1973/1604), which renamed the company the North Surrey Water Company.

==== Woking and District Water Company ====
The Woking and District Water Company was founded as the Woking Water and Gas Company by the Woking Water and Gas Act 1881 (44 & 45 Vict. c. cxvi).

The Woking and District Water Company absorbed the West Surrey Water Company by the Woking Water Order 1959 (SI 1959/1793).

The West Surrey Water Company had been formed by the West Surrey Water Act 1869 (32 & 33 Vict. c. cxii) to supply water to Walton, Weybridge, Chertsey, Byfleet, Cobham, and Shepperton.

== Supply area ==
The area served lay to the north and west of London, including parts of Hertfordshire, Bedfordshire, Buckinghamshire, Essex and Surrey.

The company depended heavily upon the local chalk aquifer for its supplies. Eventually due to a combination of lower than average rainfall and growing demand, the aquifer became depleted. This affected the environment as some watercourses become seasonal and domestic users were subject to drought restrictions, for the first time for many years. This may have been a contributing factor in the outbreak of Cryptosporidium parvum in March 1997 when Three Valleys had to ask 300,000 consumers in Hertfordshire and thousands more in the London boroughs of Harrow and Brent to boil water. The health warning also caused the closure of schools in affected areas. The source was never isolated though several water supply boreholes in the chalk aquifer between St Albans and Bushey contained the pathogen.
