= Northern Ireland (Emergency Provisions) Act 1978 =

Act of the Parliament of the United Kingdom

Northern Ireland (Emergency Provisions) Act 1978 (Note: Section 36(1).)
- Act of Parliament
- Parliament of the United Kingdom
- Long title: An Act to consolidate, with certain exceptions, the Northern Ireland (Emergency Provisions) Act 1973, the Northern Ireland (Young Persons) Act 1974 and the Northern Ireland (Emergency Provisions) (Amendment) Act 1975.
- Citation: 1978 c. 5
- Territorial extent: Northern Ireland (Note: Section 36(2).)

Dates
- Royal assent: 23 March 1978
- Commencement: 23 March 1978 (sections 32 and 33); 1 June 1978 (rest of act); (Note: Section 33(1).)
- Repealed: 27 August 1991

Other legislation
- Amends: See § Repealed enactments
- Repeals/revokes: See § Repealed enactments
- Amended by: Judicature (Northern Ireland) Act 1978
- Repealed by: Northern Ireland (Emergency Provisions) Act 1991

Status: Repealed

Text of statute as originally enacted

Revised text of statute as amended

The Northern Ireland (Emergency Provisions) Act 1978 (c. 5) was an act of the Parliament of the United Kingdom that consolidated enactments related to emergency provisions in Northern Ireland.

== Provisions ==
=== Repealed enactments ===
Section 35(3) of the act repealed 7 enactments and 12 orders, listed in parts I and II of schedule 6 to the act, respectively.

Part I – Acts, Etc.
| Citation | Short title | Extent of repeal |
|---|---|---|
| 1973 c. 53 | Northern Ireland (Emergency Provisions) Act 1973 | Sections 2 to 4 and 6 to 8. |
| 1973 c. 53 | Northern Ireland (Emergency Provisions) Act 1973 | Sections 10 to 18. |
| 1973 c. 53 | Northern Ireland (Emergency Provisions) Act 1973 | Section 19(1) to (7). |
| 1973 c. 53 | Northern Ireland (Emergency Provisions) Act 1973 | Sections 20 and 21. |
| 1973 c. 53 | Northern Ireland (Emergency Provisions) Act 1973 | Sections 23 to 27. |
| 1973 c. 53 | Northern Ireland (Emergency Provisions) Act 1973 | In section 28(1), the definitions, except that of "enactment". |
| 1973 c. 53 | Northern Ireland (Emergency Provisions) Act 1973 | Section 29. |
| 1973 c. 53 | Northern Ireland (Emergency Provisions) Act 1973 | In section 30, subsections (1) to (3), in subsections (4) and (5), the words "whether" and "or subsequently" and subsections (6) and (7). |
| 1973 c. 53 | Northern Ireland (Emergency Provisions) Act 1973 | In section 31, subsections (2), (3) and (5) and in subsection (7), the words "for the time being in force", paragraph (b) and the word "and" preceding it. |
| 1973 c. 53 | Northern Ireland (Emergency Provisions) Act 1973 | Schedules 2 to 5. |
| 1974 c. 33 | Northern Ireland (Young Persons) Act 1974 | The whole act. |
| 1975 c. 59 | Criminal Jurisdiction Act 1975 | In section 4(1), the words from the beginning to "and". |
| 1975 c. 59 | Criminal Jurisdiction Act 1975 | In Schedule 2, paragraphs 1, 2(1) and 3. |
| 1975 c. 62 | Northern Ireland (Emergency Provisions) (Amendment) Act 1975 | Sections 2 to 5. |
| 1975 c. 62 | Northern Ireland (Emergency Provisions) (Amendment) Act 1975 | Section 6(1) and (2)(a). |
| 1975 c. 62 | Northern Ireland (Emergency Provisions) (Amendment) Act 1975 | Section 8. |
| 1975 c. 62 | Northern Ireland (Emergency Provisions) (Amendment) Act 1975 | Section 9(1) and (3). |
| 1975 c. 62 | Northern Ireland (Emergency Provisions) (Amendment) Act 1975 | Sections 10 to 13. |
| 1975 c. 62 | Northern Ireland (Emergency Provisions) (Amendment) Act 1975 | In section 14, the words from the beginning to "and accordingly". |
| 1975 c. 62 | Northern Ireland (Emergency Provisions) (Amendment) Act 1975 | Sections 15 to 19. |
| 1975 c. 62 | Northern Ireland (Emergency Provisions) (Amendment) Act 1975 | Sections 21 and 22. |
| 1975 c. 62 | Northern Ireland (Emergency Provisions) (Amendment) Act 1975 | Section 23(2). |
| 1975 c. 62 | Northern Ireland (Emergency Provisions) (Amendment) Act 1975 | In Schedule 1, Part I. |
| 1975 c. 62 | Northern Ireland (Emergency Provisions) (Amendment) Act 1975 | Schedules 2 and 3. |
| 1976 c. 8 | Prevention of Terrorism (Temporary Provisions) Act 1976 | In Schedule 3, in paragraph 8, the words from "and accordingly" onwards. |
| SI 1977/426 (N.I. 4) | Criminal Damage (Northern Ireland) Order 1977 | Article 13(5). |
| 1977 c. 34 | Northern Ireland (Emergency Provisions) (Amendment) Act 1977 | The whole act. |

Part II – Orders
| Citation | Title | Extent of revocation |
|---|---|---|
| SI 1973/1880 | Northern Ireland (Emergency Provisions) Act Proscribed Organisations (Amendment) Order 1973 | The whole order. |
| SI 1974/864 | Northern Ireland (Emergency Provisions) Act 1973 (Amendment) Order 1974 | In Article 3, the words from the beginning to "of the Act)". |
| SI 1974/1212 | Northern Ireland (Emergency Provisions) Act 1973 (Continuance) Order 1974 | The whole order. |
| SI 1974/2162 | Northern Ireland (Various Emergency Provisions) (Continuance) Order 1974 | The whole order. |
| SI 1975/1059 | Northern Ireland (Various Emergency Provisions) (Continuance) Order 1975 | The whole order. |
| SI 1975/1609 | Northern Ireland (Emergency Provisions) Act 1973 (Amendment) Order 1975 | The whole order. |
| SI 1975/2214 | Northern Ireland (Various Emergency Provisions) (Continuance) (No. 2) Order 1975 | The whole order. |
| SI 1976/1090 | Northern Ireland (Various Emergency Provisions) (Continuance) Order 1976 | The whole order. |
| SI 1976/2238 | Northern Ireland (Various Emergency Provisions) (Continuance) (No. 2) Order 1976 | The whole order. |
| SI 1977/1171 | Northern Ireland (Various Emergency Provisions) (Continuance) Order 1977 | The whole order. |
| SI 1977/1265 | Northern Ireland (Emergency Provisions) Act 1973 (Amendment) Order 1977 | The whole order. |
| SI 1977/2142 | Northern Ireland (Various Emergency Provisions) (Continuance) (No. 2) Order 1977 | The whole order. |

== Subsequent developments ==
The whole act was repealed by section 70(4) of, and part I of schedule 8 to, the Northern Ireland (Emergency Provisions) Act 1991, which came into force on 27 August 1991.
