= British Telecommunications Act 1981 =

Act of the Parliament of the United Kingdom

British Telecommunications Act 1981 (Note: Section 90(1).)
- Act of Parliament
- Parliament of the United Kingdom
- Long title: An Act to establish a public corporation to be called British Telecommunications; to make provision with respect to its functions and to transfer to it certain property, rights and liabilities of the Post Office; to make further provision with respect to the Post Office; to provide for dealings by the Treasury in the shares of Cable and Wireless Limited; to amend the Telegraph Acts; and for connected purposes.
- Citation: 1981 c. 38
- Introduced by: Keith Joseph
- Territorial extent: United Kingdom; Isle of Man; (Note: Section 90(2).)

Dates
- Royal assent: 27 July 1981
- Commencement: 27 July 1981; 1 October 1981 (Note: The British Telecommunications Act 1981 (Appointed Day) Order 1981 (SI 1981/1274).); (Note: Section 1(2).)
- Repealed: Isle of Man: 22 July 2004
Other legislation
Amends	Registered Designs Act 1949; See § Repealed enactments
Repeals/revokes	See § Repealed enactments
Amended by	New Towns Act 1981; Acquisition of Land Act 1981; Broadcasting Act 1981; Civil Aviation Act 1982; Telecommunications Act 1984; Planning (Consequential Provisions) Act 1990; Statute Law (Repeals) Act 1993; Planning (Consequential Provisions) (Scotland) Act 1997; Postal Services Regulations 1999; Abolition of Feudal Tenure etc. (Scotland) Act 2000; Postal Services Act 2000; Communications Act 2003; Postal Services Act 2000 (Consequential Modifications) Order 2003; Statute Law (Repeals) Act 2004; Companies Act 2006 (Consequential Amendments, Transitional Provisions and Savings) Order 2009
Repealed by	Isle of Man: Statute Law (Repeals) Act 2004

Status: Amended

Text of statute as originally enacted

Revised text of statute as amended

Text of the British Telecommunications Act 1981 as in force today (including any amendments) within the United Kingdom, from legislation.gov.uk.

The British Telecommunications Act 1981 (c. 38) is an act of the Parliament of the United Kingdom that transferred the state-owned telephone network from the Post Office to a new statutory corporation, British Telecommunications, branded as "British Telecom".

== Provisions ==
=== Repealed enactments ===
Section 89(1) of the act repealed 25 enactments, listed in parts I and II of schedule 6 to the act. The enactments in part I were repealed on the passing of the act; those in part II were repealed on the appointed day.

==== Part I: Enactments Repealed on the Passing of this Act ====
Part I — Enactments Repealed on the Passing of this Act
Citation	Short title	Extent of repeal
31 & 32 Vict. c. 110	Telegraph Act 1868	Section 11. In the Schedule, paragraphs 7 to 9, 12 and 13.
41 & 42 Vict. c. 76	Telegraph Act 1878	In section 2, in the definition of " telegraphic line ", the words from " and also " to " communication ". Section 14.
55 & 56 Vict. c. 59	Telegraph Act 1892	Section 8.
1 & 2 Geo. 5. c. 26	Telephone Transfer Act 1911	The whole act.
1 & 2 Geo. 5. c. 39	Telegraph (Construction) Act 1911	Section 6(2).
1 & 2 Eliz. 2. c. 36	Post Office Act 1953	Sections 3 and 4.
2 & 3 Eliz. 2. c. iv	Dover Harbour Consolidation Act 1954	Section 120.
9 & 10 Eliz. 2. c. 15	Post Office Act 1961	The whole act.
1968 c. 13	National Loans Act 1968	In Schedule 5, the entry relating to the Post Office Act 1961.
1969 c. 48	Post Office Act 1969	Section 1. In section 2(6), the words from " but anything " onwards. In section 6, in subsection (1), the words from " so, however " onwards, in subsection (2), paragraph (a) and, in paragraph (b), the words " after the expiration of that period ", and subsection (2A). Section 12(10). Section 14(18). Section 17. Section 19. Sections 31 and 32. Section 34. Section 50. Section 68. Section 74(1). Section 81(3). Sections 82 and 83. Section 85. In section 86(1), in the definition of " local authority ", the words " county borough ". Sections 106 and 107. Section 127. In section 129(1), the words " or any order made under section 17 of this Act " and " or any copy of any such order ". Sections 130 and 131. In Schedule 1, paragraphs 2(2), 4(2) and 11(2), (3) and (5). In Schedule 4, in paragraph 2(1), in the Table, the entry relating to section 3 of the 1953 Act and paragraphs 81, 87, 93(1)(i), (ii) and (viii), 94 and 98. Schedule 7. In Schedule 9, paragraphs 3(1), (3), (4) and (6), 4, 5, 8, 15, 16, 18, 19, 22 to 26, 31, 32, 36 to 47 and 50.
1977 c. 44	Post Office Act 1977	The whole act.
Northern Ireland Legislation
1970 c. 1 (N.I.)	Harbours Act (Northern Ireland) 1970	In section 26(4), the words " as from the appointed day within the meaning of the Post Office Act 1969 ".
SI 1974/2143 (N.I. 6)	Juries (Northern Ireland) Order 1974	In Schedule 2, the words " Officers of the Post Office ".

==== Part II: Enactments Repealed on the Appointed Day ====
Part II — Enactments Repealed on the Appointed Day
Citation	Short title	Extent of repeal
26 & 27 Vict. c. 112	Telegraph Act 1863	In section 24, the words from " and send " onwards. Section 34.
1 & 2 Eliz. 2. c. 36	Post Office Act 1953	In section 60(1), the words " or telephone kiosk or cabinet " (twice) and the words " kiosk or cabinet ". In section 61(1), the words " telegraph post " and the word " post ", in the last place where it occurs. In section 64(1), the words " or ' postal telegraph office ' or ' public telephone call office ' " and the words " or a place where the public may make telephone calls ". Section 65A. In section 87(1), the definition of " telegraph post ".
1967 c. 62	Post Office (Data Processing Service) Act 1967	The whole act.
1968 c. 60	Theft Act 1968	In Schedule 2, in Part I, paragraph 8.
1969 c. 48	Post Office Act 1969	Section 9. Section 11(7). Section 13. Sections 23 to 27. In section 29, in subsection (1), paragraphs (b) and (d) and, in subsection (2), the words " or telephone exchange attendant ". Sections 35 and 36. Section 42. Section 54. Section 65. Section 69(1) and (2). In section 72(1), the words " or telegraphic ". Section 78. Section 86(3). In section 87(1), paragraphs (a)(ii), (b)(ii) and (c)(ii). Section 88(6). In Schedule 4, paragraph 2(16), in paragraph 21(1), the words " telegraph, telephone, wireless or signal station or " and paragraphs 78(1), 79, 86(1) and 93(1)(xxix).
1972 c. 79	Post Office (Borrowing Powers) Act 1972	The whole act.
1973 c. 36	Northern Ireland Constitution Act 1973	In Schedule 3, in paragraph 13, the words " telecommunications and ".
1974 c. 7	Local Government Act 1974	In Schedule 3, paragraph 5(a).
1974 c. 8	Statutory Corporations (Financial Provisions) Act 1974	In Schedule 2, paragraph 4.
1975 c. 55	Statutory Corporations (Financial Provisions) Act 1975	In Schedule 2, the entry relating to the Post Office. In Schedule 4, paragraph 5.
1976 c. 10	Post Office (Banking Services) Act 1976	Section 2. In section 3(2), the words from " and shall " onwards.
Northern Ireland Legislation
SI 1973/2095	Local Government Reorganisation (Consequential Provisions) (Northern Ireland) Order 1973	In Schedule 1, paragraph 7.

Section 89 and schedule 6 extended to the Isle of Man so far as regards any enactment mentioned in that schedule that so extended, other than the Telegraph Act 1863 (26 & 27 Vict. c. 112), and extended to the Channel Islands so far as regards any enactment so mentioned that so extended.

== Subsequent developments ==
The whole act was repealed for the Isle of Man by section 1(1) of, and group 11 of part 17 of schedule 1 to, the Statute Law (Repeals) Act 2004, which came into force on 22 July 2004.
