= British Airways Board Act 1977 =

Act of the Parliament of the United Kingdom

British Airways Board Act 1977 (Note: Section 25(1).)
- Act of Parliament
- Parliament of the United Kingdom
- Long title: An Act to consolidate Part III and Schedule 8 of the Civil Aviation Act 1971 and certain enactments in Part IV of that Act and the Air Corporations Act 1967 and certain provisions of the Air Corporations (Dissolution) Order 1973 with corrections and minor improvements made under the Consolidation of Enactments (Procedure) Act 1949.
- Citation: 1977 c. 13
- Territorial extent: United Kingdom (Note: Section 25(3).)

Dates
- Royal assent: 30 March 1977
- Commencement: 30 April 1977 (Note: Section 25(2).)
- Repealed: 1 April 1984 (Note: The Civil Aviation Act 1980 (Appointed Day) Order 1983 (SI 1983/1940).)
Other legislation
Repealed by	Civil Aviation Act 1980

Status: Repealed

Text of statute as originally enacted

The British Airways Board Act 1977 (c. 13) was an act of the Parliament of the United Kingdom that consolidated enactments relating to the British Airways Board in the United Kingdom.

== Provisions ==
=== Repealed enactments ===
Section 24(1) of the act repealed 7 enactments and revoked 1 instrument, listed in schedule 2 to the act.

Enactments repealed by section 24(1)
Citation	Short title	Extent of repeal
1967 c. 33	Air Corporations Act 1967	Sections 2(3), 10, 11, 23, 25, 26, 28 and 31(1). In section 31(2) the words from "and any power" to "an order" and the words "or order". Section 33(1). Section 36. Schedule 1. In paragraph 3 of Schedule 2 the words "or section 24 of this Act". Schedule 3.
1968 c. 61	Civil Aviation Act 1968	Section 24.
1971 c. 75	Civil Aviation Act 1971	Part III. In section 63, in subsection (1) the words "an instrument containing such orders as are mentioned in the following subsection" and the words "and regulations under section 56 of this Act", and subsection (2). In section 64(1), in the definition of "accounting year", the words "or the Board or the group within the meaning of Part III of this Act" and the words "or the Board or the said group", the definition of the Board and in the definition of "subsidiary" the words "except in Part III of this Act". Schedule 8. In Schedule 10, paragraphs 16, 21(3), 22 and 23.
1972 c. 11	Superannuation Act 1972	Section 21. In section 30, subsections (3) and (5)(c). In Schedule 6, paragraphs 68 and 96.
1973 c. 51	Finance Act 1973	Section 36(2).
1974 c. 8	Statutory Corporations (Financial Provisions) Act 1974	In Schedule 2, paragraph 6 and in paragraph 7 the words "(2) The British Airways Board" and the entries relating to sections 41(2) and 48(2) of the Civil Aviation Act 1971.
1975 c. 55	Statutory Corporations (Financial Provisions) Act 1975	In Schedule 2, the words "The British Airways Board". In Schedule 4, paragraph 6(5).

Instruments revoked by section 24(1)
Citation	Title	Extent of revocation
SI 1973/2175	Air Corporations (Dissolution) Order 1973	The following provisions, namely, paragraphs 5, 7 to 12 and 14 to 24 of the Schedule.

== Subsequent developments ==
The whole act was repealed by section 8(1) of, and part I of schedule 3 to, the Civil Aviation Act 1980, which came into force on 1 April 1984.
