= Gallagher v Post Office =

1970 UK labour law case

- Court: High Court of Justice
- Citation: [1970] 3 All ER 712

Keywords
- Trade union, collective bargaining

Gallagher v Post Office [1970] 3 All ER 712 is a UK labour law case, concerning the enforceability of collective agreements.

== Facts ==
Mr Gallagher was a member of the National Guild of Telephonists that the Post Office wish to derecognise in the process of changing into a public company under the Post Office Act 1969. It wished solely to recognise the Union of Postal Workers. Mr Gallagher claimed this would breach an implied term of his contract, based on what a trainer had told him when he started, namely that he was free to join any or no union.

== Judgment ==
Brightman J held that it could not be an express term of the contract, and the statement by the trainer was merely an informative statement. It could not be actionable as a term that someone was covered by any particular agreement.

== See also ==
- UK labour law
