= List of statutory instruments of the United Kingdom, 1953 =

This is an incomplete list of statutory instruments of the United Kingdom in 1953.

== Statutory instruments ==
=== 1-499 ===
- Diseases of Animals (Extension of Definition of Poultry) Order 1953 (SI 1953/37)
- Psittacosis or Ornithosis Order 1953 (SI 1953/38)
- Merchant Shipping (Confirmation of Legislation) (Federation of Malaya) Order 1953 (SI 1953/195)
- House of Commons (Redistribution of Seats) (Scotland) (Bothwell, North Lanarkshire and Motherwell) Order 1953 (SI 1953/386)
- House of Commons (Redistribution of Seats) (Scotland) (Bothwell, North Lanarkshire and Coatbridge and Airdrie) Order 1953 (SI 1953/387)
- House of Commons (Redistribution of Seats) (Scotland) (West Renfrewshire and Greenock) Order 1953 (SI 1953/388)
- House of Commons (Redistribution of Seats) (Scotland) (Clackmannan and East Stirlingshire and Stirling and Falkirk Burghs) Order 1953 (SI 1953/389)
- House of Commons (Redistribution of Seats) (Scotland) (West Fife and Kirkcaldy Burghs) Order 1953 (SI 1953/390)
- Veterinary Surgeons (University Degrees) (Cambridge) Order of Council 1953 (SI 1953/404)

=== 500-999 ===
- Airways Corporations (General Staff Pensions) (Amendment) Regulations 1953 (SI 1953/611)
- Trading with the Enemy (Enemy Territory Cessation) (France) Order 1953 (SI 1953/780)
- Coal Industry (Superannuation Scheme) (Winding Up, No. 5) Regulations 1953 (SI 1953/845)
- National Insurance and Industrial Injuries (Reciprocal Agreement with Italy) Order 1953 (SI 1953/884)
- Merchant Shipping (Confirmation of Legislation) (Cyprus) Order 1953 (SI 1953/972)

=== 1000-1499 ===
- Stores for Explosives Order 1953 (SI 1953/1197)
- Transfer of Functions (Ministry of Pensions) Order 1953 (SI 1953/1198)
- Merchant Shipping Safety Convention (Singapore) No. 1 Order 1953 (SI 1953/1218)
- Merchant Shipping Safety Convention (Singapore) No. 2 Order 1953 (SI 1953/1219)
- British Transport Commission (Executives) Order 1953 (SI 1953/1291)
- Airways Corporations (Radio, Navigating and Engineer Officers Pensions) Regulations 1953 (SI 1953/1296)
- Great Ouse River Board (Old West Internal Drainage District) Order 1953 (SI 1953/1297)
- Doncaster Corporation Trolley Vehicles (Increase of Charges) Order 1953 (SI 1953/1348)
- British Transport Commission (Pensions of Employees) Regulations 1953 (SI 1953/1445)
- Wrexham and East Denbighshire Water (No. 2) Order 1953 (SI 1953/1449)
- Consular Conventions (Kingdom of Greece) Order 1953 (SI 1953/1454)
- Consular Conventions (French Republic) Order 1953 (SI 1953/1455)
- Iron and Steel Foundries Regulations 1953 (SI 1953/1464)
- Mule Spinning (Health) Special Regulations 1953 (SI 1953/1545)

=== 1500-1999 ===
- Aliens Order 1953 (SI 1953/1671)
- Civil Defence (Grant) Regulations 1953 (SI 1953/1777)
- Civil Defence (Grant) (Scotland) Regulations 1953 (SI 1953/1804)
- Iron and Steel (Compensation to Officers and Servants) (No. 2) Regulations 1953 (SI 1953/1849)

== See also ==
- List of statutory instruments of the United Kingdom
