= Fuel and Electricity (Control) Act 1973 =

Act of the Parliament of the United Kingdom

Fuel and Electricity (Control) Act 1973 (Note: Section 11(1).)
- Act of Parliament
- Parliament of the United Kingdom
- Long title: An Act to make temporary provision for controlling the production, supply, acquisition and use of certain substances and of electricity; and for purposes connected with those matters.
- Citation: 1973 c. 67
- Introduced by: Secretary of State for Trade and Industry Peter Walker 26 November 1973 (Second Reading) (Commons)
- Territorial extent: United Kingdom; Crown Dependencies; (Note: Section 11(2). The act could also be extended to the Isle of Man and the Channel Islands by Order in Council under section 9.)

Dates
- Royal assent: 6 December 1973
- Commencement: 6 December 1973 (Note: The Acts of Parliament (Commencement) Act 1793.)
Other legislation
Amended by	Fuel and Electricity (Control) (Northern Ireland) Order 1973; Fuel and Electricity (Control) Act 1973 (Continuation) Order 1974 (SI 1974/1893); Fuel and Electricity (Control) Act 1973 (Continuation) Order 1975 (SI 1975/1705); Energy Act 1976; Road Traffic (Northern Ireland) Order 1981

Status: Partially repealed

Text of statute as originally enacted

Revised text of statute as amended

Text of the Fuel and Electricity (Control) Act 1973 as in force today (including any amendments) within the United Kingdom, from legislation.gov.uk.

The Fuel and Electricity (Control) Act 1973 (c. 67) is an act of the Parliament of the United Kingdom which empowered the Secretary of State to control the production, supply, acquisition and use of petroleum, petroleum derived products, substances used as fuel, and electricity.

== Background ==
The Yom Kippur War in the Middle East created considerable uncertainty over oil supplies and prices. Furthermore, industrial action had taken place in the UK electricity power industry and the coal industry engendering further uncertainty about supplies.

A short enabling act allowed the Secretary of State for Trade and Industry and President of the Board of Trade to temporarily control the production, supply, acquisition and use of petroleum and petroleum products and any other substance used as fuel, and the production, supply and use of electricity.

== Provisions ==
The act received royal assent on 6 December 1973. Its long title was "An Act to make temporary provision for controlling the production, supply, acquisition and use of certain substances and of electricity; and for purposes connected with those matters".

The act comprised 11 sections:

- Section 1 Application of Act
- Section 2 Powers of control
- Section 3 Documents and information
- Section 4 Power to relax statutory and contractual obligations, etc.
- Section 5 Application of provisions of Emergency Laws (Re-enactments and Repeals) Act 1964
- Section 6 Offences and penalties
- Section 7 Expenses
- Section 8 Interpretation
- Section 9 Isle of Man and Channel Islands
- Section 10 Duration of Act
- Section 11 Short title and extent

== Effects of the act ==
The act enabled orders to be made to restrict lighting and heating. A three-day working week for industry was introduced on 17 December 1973. Shops and offices could only use electricity in the morning or afternoon. There were also voltage reductions and load disconnections.

The act was in force for the initial term of one year which expired on 30 November 1974. The act was extended twice by:

Fuel and Electricity (Control) Act 1973 (Continuation) Order 1974
- Statutory Instrument
- Parliament of the United Kingdom
- Citation: SI 1974/1893

Dates
- Made: 14 November 1974
- Laid before Parliament: 20 November 1974
- Commencement: 21 November 1974
Other legislation
Made under	Fuel and Electricity (Control) Act 1973

Text of statute as originally enacted

Fuel and Electricity (Control) Act 1973 (Continuation) Order 1975
- Statutory Instrument
- Parliament of the United Kingdom
- Citation: SI 1975/1705

Dates
- Made: 22 October 1975
- Laid before Parliament: 29 October 1975
- Commencement: 21 November 1975
Other legislation
Made under	Fuel and Electricity (Control) Act 1973

Text of statute as originally enacted

- the Fuel and Electricity (Control) Act 1973 (Continuation) Order 1974 (SI 1974/1893)
- the Fuel and Electricity (Control) Act 1973 (Continuation) Order 1975 (SI 1975/1705)

== Subsequent developments ==
The whole act, subject to savings for Northern Ireland, the Channel Islands and the Isle of Man, was repealed by section 22 of, and schedule 4 to, the Energy Act 1976. Section 4, together with so much of the act as was required for its interpretation, remained in force in Northern Ireland with amendments, and the orders made under the act that were listed in the schedule continued in force. The act also remained in renewable force in the Crown Dependencies: in the Channel Islands and the Isle of Man until the last continuation in 1977; in Jersey and the Isle of Man until the last continuation in 1979; and in Jersey until the last continuation in 1989.

== See also ==
- Timeline of the UK electricity supply industry
