= Energy Act 1976 =

Act of the Parliament of the United Kingdom

Energy Act 1976 (Note: Section 23(1).)
- Act of Parliament
- Parliament of the United Kingdom
- Long title: An Act to make further provision with respect to the nation's resources and use of energy
- Citation: 1976 c. 76
- Introduced by: Minister of State, Department of Energy (Dr. J. Dickson Mabon) 15 June 1976 (Second Reading) (Commons)
- Territorial extent: England and Wales; Scotland; Northern Ireland (sections 7–11, 13 and 14); (Note: Section 23(3).)

Dates
- Royal assent: 22 November 1976
- Commencement: various (Note: Section 23(2).)

Other legislation
- Amends: Continental Shelf Act 1964; Electricity Act 1972; Gas Act 1972
- Repeals/revokes: Fuel and Electricity (Control) Act 1973
- Amended by: Criminal Procedure (Scotland) Act 1975; Transport Act 1980; Gas Act 1980; Public Passenger Vehicles Act 1981; Oil and Gas (Enterprise) Act 1982; Criminal Justice Act 1982; Industrial Development Act 1982; Energy Act 1983; Co-operative Development Agency and Industrial Development Act 1984; Transport Act 1985; Gas Act 1986; Road Traffic (Consequential Provisions) Act 1988; Electricity Act 1989; Transfer of Functions (Economic Statistics) Order 1989; Gas Act 1995; Electricity (Northern Ireland) Order 1992; Driving Licences (Community Driving Licence) Regulations 1996; Petroleum Act 1998; Competition Act 1998; Justice (Northern Ireland) Act 2002; Civil Contingencies Act 2004; Growth and Infrastructure Act 2013; Deregulation Act 2015; Energy Act 2016; Electricity and Gas etc. (Amendment etc.) (EU Exit) Regulations 2019

Status: Amended

Text of statute as originally enacted

Revised text of statute as amended

Text of the Energy Act 1976 as in force today (including any amendments) within the United Kingdom, from legislation.gov.uk.

The Energy Act 1976 (c. 76) is an act of the Parliament of the United Kingdom which empowered the Secretary of State to control the production, supply, acquisition and use of fuels and electricity, and included measures for the conservation of fuels.

== Background ==
The Fuel and Electricity (Control) Act 1973 had been enacted during the 1973 oil crisis, but had to be renewed annually. The Government thought it would be expedient to put these emergency powers on a permanent basis. The Energy Act 1976 enacted this provision and included a number of other energy related requirements. The Government wished to develop policies for the conservation of energy, and to comply with European Council directives and enforce EEC (EU) regulations in the energy field. Furthermore, there were a number of provisions in existing legislation that needed to be updated. These included the regulation of flaring and venting unignited gas into the atmosphere. The British Gas Corporation was relieved from its obligation under the Gas Act 1972 to meet demands for new or additional supplies of gas to large users. It provided the Secretary of State with the power to make Orders requiring the fuel consumption of cars to be made public. It also raised the upper limit of the contributions payable under Section 2 of the Electricity Act 1972 from £25 million to £45 million.

== Provisions ==
The Energy Act 1976 (1976 chapter 76) received Royal Assent on 22 November 1976. Its long title is ‘An Act to make further provision with respect to the nation's resources and use of energy’.

The act comprises 23 Section and 4 Schedules

Permanent and reserve powers for energy conservation and control

- Section 1 General control by order
- Section 2 Reserve power to control by government directions
- Section 3 Implementation of reserve powers
- Section 4 Other powers
- Section 5 Temporary relief from restrictive practices law

Maintenance of fuel reserves

- Section 6 Bulk stocks of petroleum, etc.
- Section 7 Fuel stocks at power stations

Offshore natural gas

- Section 8 Supply of offshore natural gas
- Section 9 Use and liquefaction of offshore natural gas
- Section 10 Supplementary provisions as to consents
- Section 11 Interpretation of ss.8 to 10

Other measures for controlling energy sources and promoting economy

- Section 12 Disposal of gas by flaring, etc.
- Section 13 Restriction on obligation to supply gas
- Section 14 Fuelling of new and converted power stations
- Section 15 Passenger car fuel consumption

Miscellaneous and general

- Section 16 Finance for power projects
- Section 17 Orders and directions
- Section 18 Administration, enforcement and offences
- Section 19 Penalties
- Section 20 Financial provision
- Section 21 Interpretation
- Section 22 Repeals and savings
- Section 23 Citation, commencement and extent

Schedules

- Schedule 1 Relaxations of Road Traffic and Transport Law Permissible under Section 4(2)
- Schedule 2 Administration and other matters
- Schedule 3 Community Obligations of which Breach is Punishable under this Act
- Schedule 4 Repeals and Savings

== Effects ==
The act repealed the Fuel and Electricity (Control) Act 1973 except as it applied to the Channel Islands and the Isle of Man. The act which is still in force (in 2020) includes provisions for:

- bulk stocks of petroleum
- liquefaction of offshore natural gas
- disposal of gas by flaring
- fuelling of new and converted power stations
- passenger car fuel consumption.

== Subsequent developments ==
Section 8 of the 1976 act was repealed by the Oil and Gas (Enterprise) Act 1982. Section 16 was repealed by the Electricity Act 1989. Sections 12A and 12B were inserted by the Energy Act 2016.

== See also ==
- Timeline of the UK electricity supply industry
