= Post Office (Banking Services) Act 1976 =

Act of the Parliament of the United Kingdom

Post Office (Banking Services) Act 1976 (Note: Section 6(1).)
- Act of Parliament
- Parliament of the United Kingdom
- Long title: An Act to extend the powers of the Post Office to provide banking services; to make capital available for the provision of those services; to reduce the capital debt of the Post Office; and for connected purposes.
- Citation: 1976 c. 10
- Territorial extent: United Kingdom; Channel Islands; Isle of Man; (Note: Section 6(2).)

Dates
- Royal assent: 25 March 1976
- Commencement: 25 March 1976 (Note: The Acts of Parliament (Commencement) Act 1793.)
- Repealed: 6 November 2000 (Note: The Postal Services Act 2000 (Commencement No. 1 and Transitional Provisions) Order 2000 (SI 2000/2597).)
Other legislation
Amends	Protection of Depositors Act 1963; Protection of Depositors Act (Northern Ireland) 1964; Post Office Act 1969
Amended by	British Telecommunications Act 1981
Repealed by	Postal Services Act 2000

Status: Repealed

Text of statute as originally enacted

The Post Office (Banking Services) Act 1976 (c. 10) was an act of the Parliament of the United Kingdom. The act gave the Post Office greater power to provide banking services. It also opened up the market between Giro systems and banks for transfer services on behalf of the Treasury.

== Provisions ==
The provisions of the act include:

- Extending the power of the Post Office to provide banking services through the amendment of the Post Office Act 1969 and the Protection of Depositors Act 1963.
- Giving the Secretary of State the power to set financial objectives to be achieved by the Post Office in providing banking services.
- Making it the duty of the Post Office to abide by any such objectives.
- Allowing the government to provide money to the Post Office for the purposes of its banking services in the form of public dividend capital.
- Reducing the Post Office's debt incurred under the Post Office Act 1969 by £29.7 million.
- Repealing Section 1(2) of the Post Office (Borrowing) Act 1972.

== Repeal ==
The whole act was repealed by the Postal Services Act 2000, which came into force on 6 November 2000.

== See also ==
- Postal banking
