= Air Corporations Act 1949 =

Act of the Parliament of the United Kingdom

Air Corporations Act 1949 (Note: Section 42.)
- Act of Parliament
- Parliament of the United Kingdom
- Long title: An Act to consolidate the enactments relating to the constitution and functions of the British Overseas Airways Corporation, the British European Airways Corporation and the British South American Airways Corporation.
- Citation: 12, 13 & 14 Geo. 6. c. 91
- Territorial extent: United Kingdom; Isle of Man; (Note: Section 40.)

Dates
- Royal assent: 16 December 1949
- Commencement: 16 December 1949 (Note: The Acts of Parliament (Commencement) Act 1793.)
- Repealed: United Kingdom: 10 May 1967; Isle of Man: 16 November 1989
Other legislation
Amends	See § Repealed enactments
Repeals/revokes	See § Repealed enactments
Amended by	Statute Law Revision Act 1953; Air Corporations Act 1953; Air Corporations Act 1962; Statute Law Revision Act 1963; Air Corporations Act 1966
Repealed by	United Kingdom: Air Corporations Act 1967; Isle of Man: Statute Law (Repeals) Act 1989
Relates to	Civil Aviation Act 1949

Status: Repealed

Text of statute as originally enacted

The Air Corporations Act 1949 (12, 13 & 14 Geo. 6. c. 91) was an act of the Parliament of the United Kingdom that consolidated enactments relating to the constitution and functions of the British Overseas Airways Corporation, the British European Airways Corporation and the British South American Airways Corporation.

== Provisions ==
=== Repealed enactments ===
Section 41(1) of the act repealed 5 enactments, listed in the third schedule to the act.

Citation	Short title	Extent of repeal
2 & 3 Geo. 6. c. 61	British Overseas Airways Act 1939	The whole act.
8 & 9 Geo. 6. c. 21	Ministry of Civil Aviation Act 1945	The whole act, so far as unrepealed.
9 & 10 Geo. 6. c. 70	Civil Aviation Act 1946	The whole act, so far as unrepealed.
10 & 11 Geo. 6. c. 35	Finance Act 1947	In subsection (2) of section fifty-seven, the words "The British Overseas Airways Corporation" and the words "The British European Airways Corporation; and The British South American Airways Corporation".
12 & 13 Geo. 6. c. 57	Airways Corporations Act 1949	The whole act.

== Subsequent developments ==
The whole act was repealed for the United Kingdom by section 36(1) of, and schedule 3 to, the Air Corporations Act 1967, which came into force on 10 May 1967.

The whole act was repealed for the Isle of Man by section 1(1) of, and part X of schedule 1 to, the Statute Law (Repeals) Act 1989, which came into force on 16 November 1989.
