= Three-Day Week =

1973–74 UK electricity conservation measure

The Three-Day Week was one of several measures introduced in the United Kingdom from 1973 to 1974 by Edward Heath's Conservative government to conserve electricity, the generation of which was severely restricted owing to industrial action by coal miners and railway workers.

From 1 January 1974, commercial users of electricity were limited to three specified consecutive days' consumption each week and prohibited from working longer hours on those days. Services deemed essential (e.g. hospitals, telephone switchboards, supermarkets and newspaper printing presses) were exempt. Television companies were required to cease broadcasting at 22:30 to conserve electricity, although this restriction was dropped after a general election was called. The Three-Day Week restrictions were lifted on 7 March 1974.

There have been calls for the re-introduction of a three-day work week in the 21st century, for reasons of social well-being, sustainability and economic advantages, rather than electricity savings.

== Background ==
Throughout the 1970s the British economy was troubled by high rates of inflation. To tackle this, the government capped public sector pay rises and publicly promoted a clear capped level to the private sector. This caused unrest amongst trade unions as wages did not keep pace with price increases. This extended to most industries, including coal mining, which provided the majority of the country's fuel and had a powerful trade union.

By the middle of 1973, the National Union of Mineworkers (NUM) – drawn from a workforce who almost wholly worked for the National Coal Board – were becoming more militant with the election of Mick McGahey as vice-president. The national conference passed resolutions for a 35% wage increase, regardless of any government guidelines, and for the election of a Labour government committed to "true socialist policy" including nationalisation of land and all key monopolies.

As inflation increased, miners' wages fell in real terms and, by October 1973, average wages were 2.3% lower than recommended by the Wilberforce Inquiry, which reported on miners' pay in 1972. In November 1973, the national executive committee of the NUM rejected the pay offer from the NCB and held a national ballot on a strike. The vote was rejected by 143,006 to 82,631. However, an overtime ban was implemented with the aim of halving production. This action hurt the coal industry and was unpopular amongst the British media, although the Trades Union Congress supported the NUM's actions.

== The Three-Day Week ==
Electricity (Industrial and Commercial Use) (Control) (No. 2) Order 1973
- Statutory Instrument
- Parliament of the United Kingdom
- Citation: SI 1973/2172

Dates
- Made: 21 December 1973
- Laid before Parliament: 21 December 1973
- Commencement: 31 December 1973
Other legislation
Made under	Emergency Laws (Re-enactments and Repeals) Act 1964; Fuel and Electricity (Control) Act 1973

Text of statute as originally enacted

In the 1970s, most of the UK's electricity was produced by coal-burning power stations. To reduce electricity consumption, and thus conserve coal stocks, the Conservative Prime Minister, Edward Heath, announced a number of measures under the Fuel and Electricity (Control) Act 1973 (c. 67) on 13 December 1973, including the 'Three-Day Work Order', the Electricity (Industrial and Commercial Use) (Control) (No. 2) Order 1973 (SI 1973/2172), which came into force at midnight on 31 December. Commercial consumption of electricity would be limited to three consecutive days each week. The Labour Party, the opposition party at this time, strongly opposed the 3-day week. Heath's objectives were business continuity and survival and to avoid further inflation and a currency crisis. Rather than risk a total shutdown, working time was reduced to prolong the life of available fuel stocks. Television broadcasts were to shut down at 22:30 each day, and most pubs were closed; due to the power surges generated at 22:30, the Central Electricity Generating Board argued for a staggered shutdown on BBC and ITV, alternating nightly, and this was eventually introduced. The television broadcasting restrictions were introduced on 17 December 1973, suspended for the Christmas and New Year period, and lifted on 8 February 1974.

== Strike vote ==
On 24 January 1974, 81% of NUM members voted to strike, having rejected the offer of a 16.5% pay rise. In contrast to the regional divisions of other strikes, every region of the NUM voted by a majority in favour of strike action. The only area that did not was the Colliery Officials and Staff Association (COSA) section. Some administrative staff had joined another union, APEX, to distance themselves from the increasing militancy of the NUM. APEX members did not strike, which led to resentment amongst NUM members.

In the aftermath of the vote, there was speculation that the army would be used to transport coal and man the power stations. McGahey called in a speech for the army to disobey orders, and either stay in the barracks or join picket lines, if they were asked to break the strike. In response, 111 Labour MPs signed a statement to condemn McGahey. He responded "You can't dig coal with bayonets."

=== Results by NUM area ===
Taken from John Douglass' Strike, not the end of the story (National Coal Mining Museum for England publications), p. 24:

Voting figures for strike action (NUM)
Area / Groups	Total votes	For strike		Against strike	
Area / Groups	Total votes	Votes	%	Votes	%
Yorkshire	54,570	49,278	90.30	5,292	9.70
Nottinghamshire	28,284	21,801	77.08	6,483	22.92
South Wales	26,901	25,058	93.12	1,843	6.85
Durham	17,341	14,862	85.70	2,479	14.30
C.O.S.A.	15,368	6,066	39.47	9,302	60.53
Scotland	16,587	14,497	87.40	2,090	12.60
Midlands (West)	12,309	9,016	73.25	3,293	26.75
North Derbyshire	10,679	9,242	86.54	1,437	13.46
North-West	8,637	7,084	82.02	1,553	17.98
Northumberland	8,420	7,075	84.03	1,345	15.97
Durham mechanics	5,937	4,590	77.31	1,347	22.69
Group no 2 (Scotland)	4,834	3,929	81.28	905	18.72
Cokemen	4,583	3,076	67.12	1,507	32.88
Power Group	3,981	2,239	56.24	1,742	43.76
South Derbyshire	2,604	1,827	70.16	777	29.84
Leicestershire	2,519	1,553	61.65	966	38.35
Kent	2,360	2,117	89.70	243	10.30
Northumberland mechanics	2,191	1,816	82.88	375	17.12
North Wales	1,200	952	79.33	248	20.67
Power group no 2	1,164	681	58.51	483	41.49
Durham enginemen	896	543	60.60	353	39.40
Cumberland	880	775	88.07	105	11.93
Yorkshire enginemen	370	316	85.41	54	14.59
Total	232,615	188,393	80.99	44,222	19.01

== Election call ==
The strike began officially on 5 February and, two days later, Heath called the February 1974 general election while the Three-Day Week was in force. His government emphasised the pay dispute with the miners and used the slogan "Who governs Britain?". Heath believed that the public sided with the Conservatives on the issues of strikes and union power.

On 21 February 1974, the government's Pay Board reported that the NUM's pay claim was within the Phase 3 system for claims and would return miners' wages to the levels recommended by the Wilberforce Inquiry in 1972.

== NUM control of picketing ==
There had been some violence on miners' picket lines during the unofficial strike of 1969 and the official strike of 1972. Aware of the damage that could be done to the Labour Party's electoral prospects by media coverage of picket-line violence, the NUM instituted strict controls over pickets. Pickets had to wear armbands saying "official picket" and had to be authorised by areas. Unlike in 1972, students were discouraged from joining miners' picket lines. Every picket line had to be authorised by the local NUM area with a chief picket to ensure that no violence took place.

== Media ==
Most of the media were strongly opposed to the NUM strike. An exception was the Daily Mirror, which ran an emotive campaign to support the NUM. Its edition on election day in 1974 showed hundreds of crosses on its front page to represent the miners who had died since nationalisation in 1947, accompanied by the message, "Before you use your cross, remember these crosses". Labour Weekly, the Labour Party's official newspaper, also supported the NUM strike and heavily criticised the government's policies.

== Election result ==
The election resulted in a hung parliament: the Conservative Party took the largest share of the vote, but lost its majority, with Labour having the most seats in the House of Commons. In the ensuing talks, Heath failed to secure enough parliamentary support from Liberal and Ulster Unionist MPs; and Harold Wilson returned to power in a minority government. The normal working week was restored on 8 March, but other restrictions on the use of electricity remained in force. A second general election was held in October 1974 cementing the Labour administration, which gained a majority of three seats.

The new Labour government increased miners' wages by 35% immediately after the February 1974 election. In February 1975, a further increase of 35% was achieved without any industrial action.

== 21st century ==
In the 21st century, those such as Anna Coote, the head of social policy at the New Economics Foundation and British sociologist Peter Fleming, among others, have proposed the re-introduction of a three-day work week. The arguments for its re-introduction include a better work-life balance, more family time, improved health and well-being, greater sustainability (such as via reduced carbon emissions), increased work productivity, and a reduction of overwork, unemployment and over-consumption.
