= Postal Services Act 2000 =

Act of the Parliament of the United Kingdom

Postal Services Act 2000 (Note: Section 131(1).)
- Act of Parliament
- Parliament of the United Kingdom
- Long title: An Act to establish the Postal Services Commission and the Consumer Council for Postal Services; to provide for the licensing of certain postal services and for a universal postal service; to provide for the vesting of the property, rights and liabilities of the Post Office in a company nominated by the Secretary of State and for the subsequent dissolution of the Post Office; to make further provision in relation to postal services; and for connected purposes.
- Citation: 2000 c. 26
- Introduced by: Stephen Byers (Commons)
- Territorial extent: England and Wales; Scotland; Northern Ireland; Isle of Man (in part); Channel Islands (in part); (Note: Section 131(2)–(4).)

Dates
- Royal assent: 28 July 2000
- Commencement: Various (Note: Section 130.)
Other legislation
Amends	Official Secrets Act 1920; Public Records Act 1958; Parliamentary Commissioner Act 1967; Criminal Justice Act 1967; Post Office Act 1969; Chronically Sick and Disabled Persons Act 1970; Pensions (Increase) Act 1971; Superannuation Act 1972; Local Government Act 1972; Northern Ireland (Modifications of Enactments – No.1) Order 1973; House of Commons Disqualification Act 1975; Rates (Northern Ireland) Order 1977; British Telecommunications Act 1981; Forgery and Counterfeiting Act 1981; Representation of the People Act 1983; Mental Health Act 1983; Miscellaneous Financial Provisions Act 1983; Telecommunications Act 1984; Interception of Communications Act 1985; Transport Act 1985; Gas Act 1986; Insolvency Act 1986; Banking Act 1987; Local Government Finance Act 1988; Water Act 1989; Electricity Act 1989; Companies Act 1989; Electricity (Northern Ireland) Order 1992; Value Added Tax Act 1994; Police and Magistrates' Courts Act 1994; Merchant Shipping Act 1995; Criminal Procedure (Scotland) Act 1995; Gas Act 1995; Value Added Tax Regulations 1995; Police Act 1996; Gas (Northern Ireland) Order 1996; Town and Country Planning (Scotland) Act 1997; Local Government and Rating Act 1997; Northern Ireland Act 1998; Scotland Act 1998 (Consequential Modifications) (No. 1) Order 1999; Postal Services Regulations 1999
Repeals/revokes	Post Office Act 1953; Post Office (Banking Services) Act 1976; Post Office (Abolition of Import Restrictions) Regulations 1993
Amended by	Enterprise Act 2002; Consumers, Estate Agents and Redress Act 2007; Companies Act 2006 (Commencement No. 3, Consequential Amendments, Transitional Provisions and Savings) Order 2007; The Regulatory Reform (Game) Order 2007; Companies Act 2006 (Consequential Amendments etc) Order 2008; Policing and Crime Act 2009; Companies Act 2006 (Consequential Amendments, Transitional Provisions and Savings) Order 2009; Transfer of Tribunal Functions (Lands Tribunal and Miscellaneous Amendments) Order 2009; Finance Act 2010; Postal Services Act 2011; Companies Act 2006 (Strategic Report and Directors' Report) Regulations 2013; Public Bodies (Abolition of the National Consumer Council and Transfer of the Office of Fair Trading’s Functions in relation to Estate Agents etc) Order 2014; Counter-Terrorism and Security Act 2015; Housing and Planning Act 2016; Taxation (Cross-border Trade) Act 2018; Postal and Parcel Services (Amendment etc.) (EU Exit) Regulations 2018; Counter-Terrorism and Border Security Act 2019; Consumer Scotland Act 2020 (Consequential Provisions and Modifications) Order 2022; Non-Domestic Rating Act 2023; Postal Packets (Miscellaneous Amendments) Regulations 2023
Relates to	Post Office Act 1969

Status: Amended

Text of statute as originally enacted

Revised text of statute as amended

The Postal Services Act 2000 (c. 26) is an act of the Parliament of the United Kingdom, relating to the postal industry with the goal of modernisation.

== Background ==
Second Reading of the bill, and debate, introduced by Secretary of State for Trade and Industry, Stephen Byers.

The Bill has four main objectives. It will give the Post Office the scope to modernise and run a fully commercial business in the 21st century. It will achieve that by converting it from a statutory corporation to a public limited company, with ownership remaining with the Crown. That will complement the greater financial flexibility that we intend to give the Post Office.

The measure will promote competition by establishing a regulator, which will reduce the part of the market that is reserved largely as a monopoly for the Post Office. The reserved area will be reduced and opened to competitors to the extent that the universal service obligation will continue to be fulfilled.

The Bill will put consumers first by establishing a new independent regulator and a new consumer council. Both will have strong powers to protect and promote the interests of those who use postal services. The Bill will reinforce the Government's commitment to a modern counters network, which will ensure reasonable access to the counter services offered by the Post Office.

Parliamentary Undersecretary Alan Johnson summed up the bill before the vote.

As it was the hon. Gentleman's maiden speech, I shall respond very quickly to the three issues that he raised. He asked whether the £1 monopoly would be safe. The £1 monopoly will be there as long as it protects universal service at a uniform tariff, which we believe should be low enough to protect competition while protecting that very important principle...

We are modernising the Post Office. It was a Labour Government who, in 1969, took the Post Office out of the civil service and made it a public corporation. We are now modernising it so that it is able to face the new challenges of the 21st century.

We can be proud of the United Kingdom Post Office. We have provided the blueprint for postal services around the world. The Bill will preserve those cherished services while ensuring that a publicly owned Post Office is able to compete effectively in the communications market of the 21st century.

== Provisions ==
It established an industry regulator, Postcomm (s.1), a consumer watchdog, Postwatch (s.2), required a "universal service" of post to be provided (ss.3-4) and set up rules for licensing postal services operators (ss.6-41). It also converted the public branch of the postal industry, the Post Office, from a statutory corporation to a public limited company, wholly owned by the government.

The act made it an offence for Royal Mail, or intermediary companies working on behalf of Royal Mail, to open postal items, which included letters, to look at their contents. The act makes it an offence to intentionally delay the post or intentionally open a mail bag.

== Regulations ==
The Postal Services Regulations 1999 (SI 1999/2107)

The Postal Services (EC Directive) Regulations 2002 (SI 2002/3050), r.8

Amendments taking effect from 1st January 2006

8. In section 12B[7] of the Act - (a) in the definition of "non-reservable service", for "80 pence" substitute "65 pence", and for "100 grams [sic]" substitute "50 grams",

(b) in the definition of "reservable service", for "80 pence" substitute "65 pence", and for "100 grams" substitute "50 grams".

Section 11 allows PostComm to grant licences that would otherwise contravene section 6(1), the general prohibition on conveying a letter from one place to another. Section 7 (amended by the 2002 regulations) stated that section 6(1) would not be contravened by carrying letters under £1 value.

Postal Services Act 2000 (Consequential Modifications to Local Enactments) Order 2003
- Statutory Instrument
- Parliament of the United Kingdom
- Citation: SI 2003/1542

Dates
- Made: 10 June 2003
- Laid before Parliament: 12 June 2003
- Commencement: 10 July 2003
Other legislation
Made under	Postal Services Act 2000

Text of the Postal Services Act 2000 (Consequential Modifications to Local Enactments) Order 2003 as in force today (including any amendments) within the United Kingdom, from legislation.gov.uk.

- Postal Services Act 2000 (Commencement No. 5) Order 2007 (SI 2007/1181)
- Postal Packets (Revenue and Customs) Regulations 2007 (SI 2007/2195)

== See also ==
- UK competition law
- Public Service law in the UK
- Postal Services Act 2011
