= List of statutory instruments of the United Kingdom =

This is a navigation article to all list articles detailing statutory instruments in the United Kingdom by year published.

== Statutory instruments by year ==
=== Prior to 1949 ===
- List of statutory instruments of the United Kingdom, 1947
- List of statutory instruments of the United Kingdom, 1948
- List of statutory instruments of the United Kingdom, 1949

=== 1950–59 ===
- List of statutory instruments of the United Kingdom, 1950
- List of statutory instruments of the United Kingdom, 1951
- List of statutory instruments of the United Kingdom, 1952
- List of statutory instruments of the United Kingdom, 1953
- List of statutory instruments of the United Kingdom, 1954
- List of statutory instruments of the United Kingdom, 1955
- List of statutory instruments of the United Kingdom, 1956
- List of statutory instruments of the United Kingdom, 1957
- List of statutory instruments of the United Kingdom, 1958
- List of statutory instruments of the United Kingdom, 1959

=== 1960–69 ===
- List of statutory instruments of the United Kingdom, 1960
- List of statutory instruments of the United Kingdom, 1961
- List of statutory instruments of the United Kingdom, 1962
- List of statutory instruments of the United Kingdom, 1963
- List of statutory instruments of the United Kingdom, 1964
- List of statutory instruments of the United Kingdom, 1965
- List of statutory instruments of the United Kingdom, 1966
- List of statutory instruments of the United Kingdom, 1967
- List of statutory instruments of the United Kingdom, 1968
- List of statutory instruments of the United Kingdom, 1969

=== 1970–79 ===
- List of statutory instruments of the United Kingdom, 1970
- List of statutory instruments of the United Kingdom, 1971
- List of statutory instruments of the United Kingdom, 1972
- List of statutory instruments of the United Kingdom, 1973
- List of statutory instruments of the United Kingdom, 1974
- List of statutory instruments of the United Kingdom, 1975
- List of statutory instruments of the United Kingdom, 1976
- List of statutory instruments of the United Kingdom, 1977
- List of statutory instruments of the United Kingdom, 1978
- List of statutory instruments of the United Kingdom, 1979

=== 1980–89 ===
- List of statutory instruments of the United Kingdom, 1980
- List of statutory instruments of the United Kingdom, 1981
- List of statutory instruments of the United Kingdom, 1982
- List of statutory instruments of the United Kingdom, 1983
- List of statutory instruments of the United Kingdom, 1984
- List of statutory instruments of the United Kingdom, 1985
- List of statutory instruments of the United Kingdom, 1986
- List of statutory instruments of the United Kingdom, 1987
- List of statutory instruments of the United Kingdom, 1988
- List of statutory instruments of the United Kingdom, 1989

=== 1990–99 ===
- List of statutory instruments of the United Kingdom, 1990
- List of statutory instruments of the United Kingdom, 1991
- List of statutory instruments of the United Kingdom, 1992
- List of statutory instruments of the United Kingdom, 1993
- List of statutory instruments of the United Kingdom, 1994
- List of statutory instruments of the United Kingdom, 1995
- List of statutory instruments of the United Kingdom, 1996
- List of statutory instruments of the United Kingdom, 1997
- List of statutory instruments of the United Kingdom, 1998
- List of statutory instruments of the United Kingdom, 1999

=== 2000–09 ===
- List of statutory instruments of the United Kingdom, 2000
- List of statutory instruments of the United Kingdom, 2001
- List of statutory instruments of the United Kingdom, 2002
- List of statutory instruments of the United Kingdom, 2003
- List of statutory instruments of the United Kingdom, 2004
- List of statutory instruments of the United Kingdom, 2005
- List of statutory instruments of the United Kingdom, 2006
- List of statutory instruments of the United Kingdom, 2007
- List of statutory instruments of the United Kingdom, 2008
- List of statutory instruments of the United Kingdom, 2009

=== 2010–19 ===
- List of statutory instruments of the United Kingdom, 2010
- List of statutory instruments of the United Kingdom, 2011
- List of statutory instruments of the United Kingdom, 2012
- List of statutory instruments of the United Kingdom, 2013
- List of statutory instruments of the United Kingdom, 2014
- List of statutory instruments of the United Kingdom, 2015
- List of statutory instruments of the United Kingdom, 2016
- List of statutory instruments of the United Kingdom, 2017
- List of statutory instruments of the United Kingdom, 2018
- List of statutory instruments of the United Kingdom, 2019

=== 2020–present ===
- List of statutory instruments of the United Kingdom, 2020
- List of statutory instruments of the United Kingdom, 2021
- List of statutory instruments of the United Kingdom, 2022
- List of statutory instruments of the United Kingdom, 2023
- List of statutory instruments of the United Kingdom, 2024
- List of statutory instruments of the United Kingdom, 2025
- List of statutory instruments of the United Kingdom, 2026

== See also ==
- List of statutory rules and orders of the United Kingdom
