= Post Office Act 1977 =

Act of the Parliament of the United Kingdom

Post Office Act 1977 (Note: Section 1(3).)
- Act of Parliament
- Parliament of the United Kingdom
- Long title: An Act to increase the maximum number of members of the Post Office.
- Citation: 1977 c. 44
- Territorial extent: United Kingdom

Dates
- Royal assent: 29 July 1977
- Commencement: 29 July 1977 (Note: The Acts of Parliament (Commencement) Act 1793.)
- Repealed: 27 July 1981
Other legislation
Amends	Post Office Act 1969
Repealed by	British Telecommunications Act 1981

Status: Repealed

Text of statute as originally enacted

The Post Office Act 1977 (c. 44) was an act of the Parliament of the United Kingdom, which regulated corporate governance at the Post Office. It required that employees had voting rights for the board of directors. It is generally thought to have proved successful, but was repealed in 1979.

== Provisions ==
Section 1(1) substituted 19 for 12 directors on the board, under the Post Office Act 1969 section 6(2).

Section 1(2) inserted a new section 6(2A) saying the maximum number would be reduced back to 12 on 31 March 1980, unless the Secretary of State made an order otherwise, draft approved by a resolution of each House of Parliament.

== Operation ==
The first new board met in January 1978. Qualitative empirical work suggests that the board functioned harmoniously, and worker participation on the board was welcomed. The Conservative government was elected on 4 May 1979. It let the two year ‘experiment’ under the Post Office Act 1977 lapse. This was criticised in Parliament, but went ahead.

== Subsequent developments ==
The whole act was repealed by section 89(1) of, and part I of schedule 6 to, the British Telecommunications Act 1981, which came into force on 27 July 1981.

== See also ==
- UK labour law
- UK company law
