= Air Corporations Act 1967 =

Act of the Parliament of the United Kingdom

Air Corporations Act 1967 (Note: Section 37.)
- Act of Parliament
- Parliament of the United Kingdom
- Long title: An Act to consolidate, with certain exceptions, the provisions of the Air Corporations Acts 1949 to 1966.
- Citation: 1967 c. 33
- Territorial extent: United Kingdom

Dates
- Royal assent: 10 May 1967
- Commencement: 10 May 1967 (Note: The Acts of Parliament (Commencement) Act 1793.)
- Repealed: 1 May 1978 (Note: The Civil Aviation Act 1978 (Commencement) Order 1978 (SI 1978/486).)
Other legislation
Amends	See § Repealed enactments
Repeals/revokes	See § Repealed enactments
Amended by	National Loans Act 1968; Air Corporations Act 1969; Civil Aviation Act 1971; Superannuation Act 1972; Statutory Corporations (Financial Provisions) Act 1974; Statutory Corporations (Financial Provisions) Act 1975; British Airways Board Act 1977
Repealed by	Civil Aviation Act 1978
Relates to	Air Corporations Act 1949; Civil Aviation Act 1949

Status: Repealed

Text of statute as originally enacted

The Air Corporations Act 1967 (c. 33) was an act of the Parliament of the United Kingdom that consolidated, with certain exceptions, the provisions of the Air Corporations Acts 1949 to 1966 relating to the British Overseas Airways Corporation and the British European Airways Corporation.

== Provisions ==
=== Repealed enactments ===
Section 36(1) of the act repealed 4 enactments, listed in schedule 3 to the act.

Enactments repealed by section 36(1)
Citation	Short title	Extent of repeal
12, 13 & 14 Geo. 6. c. 91	Air Corporations Act 1949	The whole act.
2 & 3 Eliz. 2. c. 7	Air Corporations Act 1953	The whole act.
11 & 12 Eliz. 2. c. 5	Air Corporations Act 1962	The whole act.
1966 c. 11	Air Corporations Act 1966	In section 1, subsection (1)(a) and subsections (2) and (3).
1966 c. 11	Air Corporations Act 1966	Sections 2 to 8.
1966 c. 11	Air Corporations Act 1966	In section 9, in subsection (1) the words from "and the principal Act" to the end, and subsections (2) and (4).
1966 c. 11	Air Corporations Act 1966	Schedule 2.

== Subsequent developments ==
The whole act was repealed by section 14(2) of, and schedule 2 to, the Civil Aviation Act 1978, which came into force on 1 May 1978.
