= Post Office Act 1969 =

Act of the Parliament of the United Kingdom

Post Office Act 1969 (Note: Section 149.)
- Act of Parliament
- Parliament of the United Kingdom
- Long title: An Act to abolish the office of master of the Post Office, distribute the business conducted by the holder thereof amongst authorities constituted for the purpose and make provision consequential on the abolition of that office and the distribution of the business so conducted; to amend, replace or repeal certain provisions of the enactments relating to posts, telegraphs and savings banks; to amend the law relating to stamp duty; and to empower the Treasury to dispose of their interest in the shares of Cable and Wireless Limited.
- Citation: 1969 c. 48
- Introduced by: John Stonehouse (Commons)
- Territorial extent: United Kingdom; Isle of Man; (Note: Section 139.)

Dates
- Royal assent: 25 July 1969
- Commencement: 25 July 1969 (Note: The Acts of Parliament (Commencement) Act 1793.)
- Repealed: Isle of Man: 22 July 2004
Other legislation
Amends	Crown Lands Act 1702; Gravesend and Tilbury Tunnel Act 1799; Statutory Declarations Act 1835; Metropolitan Police Act 1839; Swansea Harbour Act 1854; Promissory Oaths Act 1868; Consolidated Fund (Permanent Charges Redemption) Act 1883; Government Annuities Act 1929; Crown Proceedings Act 1947; National Parks and Access to the Countryside Act 1949; Rating and Valuation (Scotland) Act 1952; Ministers of the Crown Act 1964; Port of London Act 1968
Repeals/revokes	New General Post Office, Edinburgh, Act 1858; Telegraph Act Amendment Act 1866; Telegraph Act 1869; Post Office (Pneumatic Tubes Acquisition) Act 1922; Telephone Act 1951; Telegraph Act 1962; Post Office (Borrowing Powers) Act 1967
Amended by	Courts Act 1971; National Savings Bank Act 1971; Town and Country Planning Act 1971; Town and Country Planning (Scotland) Act 1972; National Debt Act 1972; Independent Broadcasting Authority Act 1973; Statute Law (Repeals) Act 1973; Consumer Credit Act 1974; House of Commons Disqualification Act 1975; Airports Authority Act 1975; Post Office (Banking Services) Act 1976; Statute Law (Repeals) Act 1976; Land Drainage Act 1976; Statute Law (Repeals) Act 1977; Post Office Act 1977; Employment Protection (Consolidation) Act 1978; Water (Scotland) Act 1980; Overseas Development and Co-operation Act 1980; Highways Act 1980; British Telecommunications Act 1981; Senior Courts Act 1981; New Towns Act 1981; Acquisition of Land Act 1981; Civil Aviation Act 1982; Representation of the People Act 1983; Energy Act 1983; Interception of Communications Act 1985; Bankruptcy (Scotland) Act 1985; Statute Law (Repeals) Act 1986; Wages Act 1986; Official Secrets Act 1989; Planning (Consequential Provisions) Act 1990; Statute Law (Repeals) Act 1993; Sunday Trading Act 1994; Merchant Shipping Act 1995; Statute Law (Repeals) Act 1995; Gas Act 1995; Employment Tribunals Act 1996; Employment Rights Act 1996; Planning (Consequential Provisions) (Scotland) Act 1997; Wireless Telegraphy Act 1998; Statute Law (Repeals) Act 1998; Postal Services Act 2000; Land Registration Act 2002; Statute Law (Repeals) Act 2004; Wireless Telegraphy Act 2006; Postal Services Act 2011
Repealed by	Isle of Man: Statute Law (Repeals) Act 2004

Status: Amended

Text of statute as originally enacted

Revised text of statute as amended

Text of the Post Office Act 1969 as in force today (including any amendments) within the United Kingdom, from legislation.gov.uk.

The Post Office Act 1969 (c. 48) is an act of the Parliament of the United Kingdom that changed the General Post Office from a department of state to a public corporation, known as the Post Office. It also abolished the office of Postmaster General of the United Kingdom.

The powers of the Postmaster General were transferred to a new cabinet member, the Minister of Posts and Telecommunications. The incumbent Postmaster, John Stonehouse, became the first Minister of Post and Telecommunications on 1 October 1969.

The act created a new public corporation, the Post Office, as the "authority for the conduct of postal and telegraphic business". The corporation was to consist of a chairman and between six and twelve full or part-time members. The chairman was to be appointed by the minister and the other members by the minister following consultation with the chairman. The first Chairman of the Post Office was Viscount Hall.

The main powers given to the new body were:

- To provide postal services (including cash on delivery services) and telecommunication services
- To provide a banking service of the kind commonly known as a giro system and such other services by means of which money may be remitted (whether by means of money orders, postal orders or otherwise) as it thinks fit
- To provide data processing services
- To perform services for Her Majesty's Government in the United Kingdom, Her Majesty's Government in Northern Ireland or the government of a country or territory outside the United Kingdom or for local or national health service authorities in the United Kingdom.

== Subsequent developments ==
The whole act was repealed for the Isle of Man by section 1(1) of, and group 11 of part 17 of schedule 1 to, the Statute Law (Repeals) Act 2004, which came into force on 22 July 2004.
