= List of statutory instruments of the United Kingdom, 1974 =

This is a list of statutory instruments of the United Kingdom formed in 1974.

== Statutory instruments ==
=== 1-999 ===
- National Health Service (Venereal Diseases) Regulations 1974 (SI 1974/29)
- Judicial Pensions (Widow's and Children's Benefits) Regulations 1974 (SI 1974/44)
- National Health Service (General Medical and Pharmaceutical Services) Regulations 1974 (SI 1974/160)
- Charter Trustees Order 1974 (SI 1974/176)
- Judicial Pensions (Widows' and Children's Benefits) (No. 2) Regulations 1974 (SI 1974/229)
- Offshore Installation (Construction and Survey) Regulations 1974 (SI 1974/289) (Note: Together with associated guidance notes – Offshore Installations: Guidance on the Design, Construction and Certification - replaced by SI 1996/913)
- Gloucestershire (Coroners' Districts) Order 1974 (SI 1974/368)
- National Health Service (Service Committees and Tribunal) Regulations 1974 (SI 1974/455)
- National Health Service (General Dental Services) (Scotland) Regulations 1974 (SI 1974/505)
- National Health Service (General Medical and Pharmaceutical Services) (Scotland) Regulations 1974 (SI 1974/506)
- Local Government Superannuation Regulations 1974 (SI 1974/520)
- Great Ouse River Authority (Alteration of Boundaries of the Littleport and Downham Internal Drainage District) Order 1974 (SI 1974/534)
- Crown Roads (Royal Parks) (Application of Road Traffic Enactments) Order 1974 (SI 1974/797)
- Local Government (Successor Parishes) Order 1974 (SI 1974/569)
- Local Authorities (Miscellaneous Provision) (No. 2) Order 1974 (SI 1974/595)
- Severn Valley Light Railway (Transfer) Order 1974 (SI 1974/642)
- British Railways Board (Severn Valley) Light Railway (Transfer) Order 1974 (SI 1974/643)
- London Borough of Bexley (Wards) Order 1974 (SI 1974/694)
- Charlwood and Horley (Electoral Divisions and Wards) Order 1974 (SI 1974/772)
- Local Authorities (Miscellaneous Provision) (No. 3) Order 1974 (SI 1974/968)

=== 1000-1999 ===
- Romney, Hythe and Dymchurch Light Railway (Amendment) Order 1974 (SI 1974/1024)
- Children and Young Persons Act 1969 (Transitional Modifications to Part I) Order 1974 (SI 1974/1083)
- Industrial Training (Transfer of the Activities of Establishments) Order 1974 (SI 1974/1154)
- Pensions (Increase) (Northern Ireland) Order 1974 (SI 1974/1267) (N.I. 2)
- Social Security (Consequences of Emergency) (Northern Ireland) Order 1974 (SI 1974/1268) (N.I. 3)
- Charlwood and Horley (Electoral Divisions and Wards) (Amendment) Order 1974 (SI 1974/1353)
- Pensions Increase (Annual Review) Order 1974 (SI 1974/1373)
- Health and Safety at Work etc. Act 1974 (Commencement No. 1) Order 1974 (SI 1974/1439)
- Industrial Training (Transfer of the Activities of Establishments) (No. 2) Order 1974 (SI 1974/1495)
- Police Pensions (Amendment) Regulations 1974 (SI 1974/1533)
- Police Pensions (Amendment) (No. 2) Regulations 1974 (SI 1974/1673)
- Merchant Shipping (Seamen's Documents) (Amendment) Regulations 1974 (SI 1974/1734)
- Radioactive Substances (Carriage by Road) (Great Britain) Regulations 1974 (SI 1974/1735)
- Police Pensions (Amendment) (No. 3) Regulations 1974 (SI 1974/1796)
- British Railways Board (Whitby and Pickering) Light Railway Order 1974 (SI 1974/1857)
- Fuel and Electricity (Control) Act 1973 (Continuation) Order 1974 (SI 1974/1893)
- National Health Service (Charges for Appliances) (Scotland) Regulations 1974 (SI 1974/1910)
- Merchant Shipping (Radio) (Fishing Vessels) Rules 1974 (SI 1974/1919)
- British Railways Board (Minehead Branch) Light Railway Order 1974 (SI 1974/1933)

=== 2000- ===
- Mines and Quarries Act 1954 to 1971 (Repeals and Modifications) Regulations 1974 (SI 1974/2013)
- Agriculture (Tractor Cabs) Regulations 1974 (SI 1974/2034)
- Home-Grown Cereals Authority Levy Scheme (Approval) Order 1974 (SI 1974/2083)
- Financial Provisions (Northern Ireland) Order 1974 (SI 1974/2141) (N.I. 4)
- Youth Employment Service (Northern Ireland) Order 1974 (SI 1974/2144) (N.I. 7)
- Clean Air Enactments (Repeals and Modifications) Regulations 1974 (SI 1974/2170)

== See also ==
- List of statutory instruments of the United Kingdom
