= List of statutory instruments of the United Kingdom, 1975 =

This is an incomplete list of statutory instruments of the United Kingdom in 1975.

== Statutory instruments ==
=== 1-499 ===
- Merchant Shipping (Diving Operations) Regulations 1975 (SI 1975/116)
- Official Secrets (Prohibited Places) Order 1975 (SI 1975/182)
- National Health Service Health Boards: Membership, Procedure and Payment of Subscriptions (Scotland) Regulations 1975 (SI 1975/197)
- Movement and Sale of Pigs Order 1975 (SI 1975/203)
- Friendly Societies Regulations 1975 (SI 1975/205)
- Clyde River Purification Board (Establishment) Order 1975 (SI 1975/232)
- Solway River Purification Board (Establishment) Order 1975 (SI 1975/233)
- Tweed River Purification Board (Establishment) Order 1975 (SI 1975/234)
- Tay River Purification Board (Establishment) Order 1975 (SI 1975/235)
- North East River Purification Board (Establishment) Order 1975 (SI 1975/236)
- Forth River Purification Board (Establishment) Order 1975 (SI 1975/237)
- Highland River Purification Board (Establishment) Order 1975 (SI 1975/310)
- Fishing Vessels (Safety Provisions) Rules 1975 (SI 1975/330)
- Community Relations (Amendment) (Northern Ireland) Order 1975 (SI 1975/417) (N.I. 2)
- Industrial Training (Transfer of the Activities of Establishments) Order 1975 (SI 1975/434)
- South Eastern Combined Fire Area Administration Scheme Order 1975 (SI 1975/487)

=== 500-999 ===
- Trade Unions and Employers' Associations (Amalgamations, etc.) Regulations 1975 (SI 1975/536)
- Social Security (Maternity Benefit) Regulations 1975 (SI 1975/553)
- Social Security (Hospital In-Patients) Regulations 1975 (SI 1975/555)
- Social Security (Credits) Regulations 1975 (SI 1975/556)
- Social Security Benefit (Persons Abroad) Regulations 1975 (SI 1975/563)
- Social Security (Attendance Allowance) (No. 2) Regulations 1975 (SI 1975/598)
- South Eastern Police (Amalgamation) Order 1975 (SI 1975/633)
- Teachers (Colleges of Education) (Scotland) Amendment Regulations 1975 (SI 1975/640)
- Local Authorities (Allowances) (Scotland) Regulations 1975 (SI 1975/686)
- Legal Aid (Scotland) (Criminal Proceedings) Regulations 1975 (SI 1975/717)
- National Health Service (General Medical and Pharmaceutical Services) Amendment Regulations 1975 (SI 1975/719)
- Merchant Shipping (Provisions and Water) (Fishing and Other Vessels) (Amendment) Regulations 1975 (SI 1975/733)
- Shipbuilding Industry (Northern Ireland) Order 1975 (SI 1975/814)
- Act of Adjournal (Rules for Legal Aid in Criminal Proceedings Amendment) 1975 (SI 1975/835)
- Act of Adjournal (Criminal Legal Aid Fees Amendment) 1975 (SI 1975/836)
- Infectious Diseases of Horses Order 1975 (SI 1975/888)
- Dourine Order 1975 (SI 1975/889)
- Gatwick Airport—London Noise Insulation Grants Scheme 1975 (SI 1975/916)
- Heathrow Airport—London Noise Insulation Grants Scheme 1975 (SI 1975/917)
- Conwy Mussel Fishery (Jetty Hoist) Light Railway Order 1975 (SI 1975/962)

=== 1000-1499 ===
- Transit of Animals (Road & Rail) Order 1975 (SI 1975/1024)
- Zoonoses Order 1975 (SI 1975/1030)
- Agriculture (Miscellaneous Provisions) (Northern Ireland) Order 1975 (SI 1975/1038) (N.I. 8)
- Defective Premises (Northern Ireland) Order 1975 (SI 1975/1039) (N.I. 9)
- Further Education Regulations 1975 (SI 1975/1054)
- Colleges of Education (Compensation) Regulations 1975 (SI 1975/1092)
- Schools General (Scotland) Regulations 1975 (SI 1975/1135)
- Industrial Training (Transfer of the Activities of Establishments) (No. 2) Order 1975 (SI 1975/1157)
- Superannuation (Judicial Offices) (Amendment) Rules 1975 (SI 1975/1183)
- Shipbuilding Industry (No. 2) (Northern Ireland) Order 1975 (SI 1975/1309)
- Electrical Equipment (Safety) Regulations 1975 (SI 1975/1366)
- Pensions Increase (Annual Review) Order 1975 (SI 1975/1384)
- House-Buildings Standards (Approved Scheme etc.) Order 1975 (SI 1975/1462)
- GKN Tremorfa Works Light Railway Order 1975 (SI 1975/1480)

=== 1500-1999 ===
- Social Security Pensions (Northern Ireland) Order 1975 (SI 1975/1503) (N.I. 15)
- Child Benefit (Northern Ireland) Order 1975 (SI 1975/1504) (N.I. 16)
- Traffic Signs Regulations and General Directions 1975 (SI 1975/1536)
- Mobility Allowance Regulations 1975 (SI 1975/1573)
- Borough of Castle Morpeth (Electoral Arrangements) Order 1975 (SI 1975/1667)
- District of Holderness (Electoral Arrangements) Order 1975 (SI 1975/1668)
- Borough of Rushcliffe (Electoral Arrangements) Order 1975 (SI 1975/1669)
- Borough of South Ribble (Electoral Arrangements) Order 1975 (SI 1975/1670)
- District of Tendring (Electoral Arrangements) Order 1975 (SI 1975/1671)
- Borough of Uttlesford (Electoral Arrangements) Order 1975 (SI 1975/1672)
- District of Dartford (Electoral Arrangements) Order 1975 (SI 1975/1681)
- Borough of Southend-on-Sea (Electoral Arrangements) Order 1975 (SI 1975/1698)
- Borough of Eastbourne (Electoral Arrangements) Order 1975 (SI 1975/1699)
- District of Pendle (Electoral Arrangements) Order 1975 (SI 1975/1700)
- Fuel and Electricity (Control) Act 1973 (Continuation) Order 1975 (SI 1975/1705)
- Police Pensions (Amendment) Regulations 1975 (SI 1975/1718)
- The Noise Insulation Regulations 1975 (SI 1975/1763)
- Tendring Hundred Water (Financial Provisions) Order 1975 (SI 1975/1771)
- Supreme Court Funds Rules 1975 (SI 1975/1803)
- City of Bath (Electoral Arrangements) Order 1975 (SI 1975/1811)
- Borough of Broxbourne (Electoral Arrangements) Order 1975 (SI 1975/1812)
- District of Runnymede (Electoral Arrangements) Order 1975 (SI 1975/1814)
- District of Salisbury (Electoral Arrangements) Order 1975 (SI 1975/1815)
- Borough of Tamworth (Electoral Arrangements) Order 1975 (SI 1975/1816)
- District of Tandridge (Electoral Arrangements) Order 1975 (SI 1975/1817)
- Borough of Watford (Electoral Arrangements) Order 1975 (SI 1975/1818)
- Artificial Reproduction of Animals (Northern Ireland) Order 1975 (SI 1975/1834) (N.I. 17)
- Fuel and Electricity (Control) Act 1973 (Continuation) (Channel Islands and Isle of Man) Order 1975 (SI 1975/1835)
- Borough of Ashford (Electoral Arrangements) Order 1975 (SI 1975/1912)
- Borough of Blackpool (Electoral Arrangements) Order 1975 (SI 1975/1913)
- District of Chelmsford (Electoral Arrangements) Order 1975 (SI 1975/1914)
- Borough of Fareham (Electoral Arrangements) Order 1975 (SI 1975/1915)
- Borough of Fylde (Electoral Arrangements) Order 1975 (SI 1975/1916)
- Borough of Langbaurgh (Electoral Arrangements) Order 1975 (SI 1975/1917)
- Borough of Luton (Electoral Arrangements) Order 1975 (SI 1975/1918)
- District of Rochford (Electoral Arrangements) Order 1975 (SI 1975/1919)
- Borough of Surrey Heath (Electoral Arrangements) Order 1975 (SI 1975/1920)
- Borough of Thamesdown (Electoral Arrangements) Order 1975 (SI 1975/1921)
- District of Wansdyke (Electoral Arrangements) Order 1975 (SI 1975/1922)
- Borough of Preston (Electoral Arrangements) Order 1975 (SI 1975/1975)
- District of Basingstoke (Electoral Arrangements) Order 1975 (SI 1975/1989)
- District of Chiltern (Electoral Arrangements) Order 1975 (SI 1975/1990)
- District of South Cambridgeshire (Electoral Arrangements) Order 1975 (SI 1975/1991)

=== 2000-2499 ===
- District of Corby (Electoral Arrangements) Order 1975 (SI 1975/2019)
- District of South Bedfordshire (Electoral Arrangements) Order 1975 (SI 1975/2065)
- District of Aylesbury Vale (Electoral Arrangements) Order 1975 (SI 1975/2083)
- Borough of Berwick-upon-Tweed (Electoral Arrangements) Order 1975 (SI 1975/2084)
- District of Brentwood (Electoral Arrangements) Order 1975 (SI 1975/2085)
- Borough of Chorley (Electoral Arrangements) Order 1975 (SI 1975/2086)
- Borough of Congleton (Electoral Arrangements) Order 1975 (SI 1975/2087)
- District of Fenland (Electoral Arrangements) Order 1975 (SI 1975/2088)
- Borough of Gedling (Electoral Arrangements) Order 1975 (SI 1975/2089)
- Borough of Guildford (Electoral Arrangements) Order 1975 (SI 1975/2090)
- District of Harlow (Electoral Arrangements) Order 1975 (SI 1975/2102)
- Borough of Hartlepool (Electoral Arrangements) Order 1975 (SI 1975/2103)
- District of Kingswood (Electoral Arrangements) Order 1975 (SI 1975/2104)
- District of Mole Valley (Electoral Arrangements) Order 1975 (SI 1975/2105)
- Borough of North Wolds (Electoral Arrangements) Order 1975 (SI 1975/2106)
- Borough of Shrewsbury and Atcham (Electoral Arrangements) Order 1975 (SI 1975/2107)
- District of Test Valley (Electoral Arrangements) Order 1975 (SI 1975/2108)
- District of Wansbeck (Electoral Arrangements) Order 1975 (SI 1975/2109)
- District of Boothferry (Electoral Arrangements) Order 1975 (SI 1975/2142)
- City of Cambridge (Electoral Arrangements) Order 1975 (SI 1975/2143)
- Borough of Colchester (Electoral Arrangements) Order 1975 (SI 1975/2144)
- Borough of Elmbridge (Electoral Arrangements) Order 1975 (SI 1975/2145)
- Borough of Epsom and Ewell (Electoral Arrangements) Order 1975 (SI 1975/2146)
- District of Northavon (Electoral Arrangements) Order 1975 (SI 1975/2147)
- District of Yeovil (Electoral Arrangements) Order 1975 (SI 1975/2148)
- District of Three Rivers (Electoral Arrangements) Order 1975 (SI 1975/2199)
- Borough of Oswestry (Electoral Arrangements) Order 1975 (SI 1975/2200)
- Borough of Eastleigh (Electoral Arrangements) Order 1975 (SI 1975/2201)
- District of Broxtowe (Electoral Arrangements) Order 1975 (SI 1975/2202)
- Oulton Broad Revision Order 1975 (SI 1975/2206)
- Merchant Shipping (Crew Accommodation) (Fishing Vessels) Regulations 1975 (SI 1975/2220)
- Immigration (Ports of Entry) (Amendment) Order 1975 (SI 1975/2221)

== See also ==
- List of statutory instruments of the United Kingdom
