= List of statutory instruments of the United Kingdom, 1973 =

This is an incomplete list of statutory instruments of the United Kingdom in 1973.

== Statutory instruments ==
=== 1-999 ===
- Districts in Wales (Names) Order 1973 (SI 1973/34)
- London Borough of Lewisham (Wards) Order 1973 (SI 1973/64)
- Drainage (Northern Ireland) Order 1973 (SI 1973/69) (N.I. 1)
- Water and Sewerage Services (Northern Ireland) Order 1973 (SI 1973/70) (N.I. 2)
- Metropolitan District (Names) Order 1973 (SI 1973/137)
- Value Added Tax (Terminal Markets) Order 1973 (SI 1973/173)
- Divided Areas (Boundaries) Order 1973 (SI 1973/297)
- British Railways Board (Severn Valley) Light Railway Order 1973 (SI 1973/357)
- Legal Advice and Assistance (Scotland) Regulations 1973 (SI 1973/390)
- Financial Provisions (Northern Ireland) Order 1973 (SI 1973/414) (N.I. 5)
- Police Pensions Regulations 1973 (SI 1973/428)
- Police Pensions (Transitory Provisions) Regulations 1973 (SI 1973/429)
- Police Cadets (Pensions) Regulations 1973 (SI 1973/430)
- Special Constables (Pensions) Regulations 1973 (SI 1973/431)
- Act of Adjournal (References to the European Court) 1973 (SI 1973/450)
- Children and Young Persons Act 1969 (Transitional Modifications of Part I) (Amendment) Order 1973 (SI 1973/485)
- Derwent Valley Light Railway Order 1973 (SI 1973/537)
- English Non-metropolitan District (Names) Order 1973 (SI 1973/551)
- Plant Varieties and Seeds (Northern Ireland) Order 1973 (SI 1973/609)
- Gatwick Airport—London Noise Insulation Grants Scheme 1973 (SI 1973/617)
- Act of Adjournal (Alteration of Criminal Legal Aid Fees) 1973 (SI 1973/673)
- New Parishes Order 1973 (SI 1973/688)
- Parliamentary Constituencies (Scotland) (Central Fife and Kirkcaldy) Order 1973 (SI 1973/764)
- Parliamentary Constituencies (Scotland) (East Renfrewshire and Paisley) Order 1973 (SI 1973/765)
- Parliamentary Constituencies (Scotland) (Midlothian and Edinburgh East) Order 1973 (SI 1973/766)
- Parliamentary Constituencies (Scotland) (North Lanarkshire and Coatbridge and Airdrie) Order 1973 (SI 1973/767)
- Parliamentary Constituencies (Scotland) (South Angus and Dundee West) Order 1973 (SI 1973/768)
- Parliamentary Constituencies (Scotland) (West Aberdeenshire, North Angus and Mearns, Aberdeen North and Aberdeen South) Order 1973 (SI 1973/769)
- Parliamentary Constituencies (Scotland) (West Stirlingshire and Stirling, Falkirk and Grangemouth) Order 1973 (SI 1973/770)
- British Railways Board (Meon Valley) Light Railway Order 1973 (SI 1973/785)
- Superannuation (Northern Ireland) Order 1973 (SI 1973/962) (N.I. 13)
- British Railways Board (Sheringham and Weybourne) Light Railway Order 1973 (SI 1973/998)

=== 1000-1999 ===
- Salaries (Comptroller and Auditor-General and Others) (Northern Ireland) Order 1973 (SI 1973/1086) (N.I. 14)
- Sound Broadcasting Act 1972 (Channel Islands) Order 1973 (SI 1973/1087)
- Sound Broadcasting Act 1972 (Isle of Man) Order 1973 (SI 1973/1088)
- Local Government (Successor Parishes) Order 1973 (SI 1973/1110)
- Windsor Great Park Regulations 1973 (SI 1973/1113)
- Criminal Appeal (References of Points of Law) Rules 1973 (SI 1973/1114)
- M66 Motorway (Bury Easterly Bypass Northern Section) and Connecting Roads Scheme 1973 (SI 1973/1142)
- Act of Adjournal (Criminal Legal Aid Fees Amendment) 1973 (SI 1973/1145)
- Town and Country Planning (Use Classes) (Scotland) Order 1973 (SI 1973/1165)
- Enterprise Ulster (Northern Ireland) Order 1973 (SI 1973/1228) (N.I. 16)
- North West Water Authority Constitution Order 1973 (SI 1973/1287)
- Northumbrian Water Authority Constitution Order 1973 (SI 1973/1288)
- Yorkshire Water Authority Constitution Order 1973 (SI 1973/1289)
- Wessex Water Authority Constitution Order 1973 (SI 1973/1306)
- South West Water Authority Constitution Order 1973 (SI 1973/1307)
- Pig Production Development (Amendment) (Northern Ireland) Order 1973 (SI 1973/1322) (N.I. 20)
- Finance (Miscellaneous Provisions) (Northern Ireland) Order 1973 (SI 1973/1323) (N.I. 18)
- Double Taxation Relief (Taxes on Income) (France) Order 1973 (SI 1973/1328)
- Welsh National Water Development Authority (Establishment and Constitution) Order 1973 (SI 1973/1345)
- Anglian Water Authority Constitution Order 1973 (SI 1973/1359)
- Thames Water Authority Constitution Order 1973 (SI 1973/1360)
- Southern Water Authority Constitution Order 1973 (SI 1973/1361)
- Pensions Increase (Annual Review) Order 1973 (SI 1973/1370)
- Northern Ireland Constitution Act 1973 (Commencement No. 1) Order 1973 (SI 1973/1418)
- Severn-Trent Water Authority Constitution Order 1973 (SI 1973/1437)
- New Parishes (Amendment) Order 1973 (SI 1973/1466)
- National Health Service (General Dental Services) Regulations 1973 (SI 1973/1468)
- Local Government (Successor Parish Councils) Order 1973 (SI 1973/1528)
- Extradition (Protection of Aircraft) Order 1973 (SI 1973/1756)
- House-Building Standards (Approved Scheme etc.) Order 1973 (SI 1973/1843)
- Land Acquisition and Compensation (Northern Ireland) Order 1973 (SI 1973/1896) (N.I. 21)
- Parish and Community Meetings (Polls) Rules 1973 (SI 1973/1911)
- Diseases of Animals (Waste Food) Order 1973 (SI 1973/1936)
- Local Government (Successor Parishes) (No. 2) Order 1973 (SI 1973/1939)

=== 2000- ===
- Fuel Control (Modification of Enactments) (Speed Limits) Order 1973 (SI 1973/2051)
- Fuel Control (Modification of Enactments) (Speed Limits) (Northern Ireland) Order 1973 (SI 1973/2052)
- Fuel and Electricity (Control) Act 1973 (Guernsey) Order 1973 (SI 1973/2053)
- Fuel and Electricity (Control) Act 1973 (Isle of Man) Order 1973 (SI 1973/2054)
- Motorways Traffic (Speed Limits) Regulations 1973 (SI 1973/2059)
- Fuel and Electricity (Control) Act 1973 (Jersey) Order 1973 (SI 1973/2160)
- Fuel and Electricity (Heating) (Control) Order 1973 (SI 1973/2068)
- Electricity (Lighting) (Control) Order 1973 (SI 1973/2080)
- Fuel and Electricity (Control) (Northern Ireland) Order 1973 (SI 1973/2090)
- Electricity (Industrial and Commercial Use) (Control) Order 1973 (SI 1973/2120)
- Legal Aid (Scotland) (General) Amendment Regulations 1973 (SI 1973/2125)
- Electricity (Lighting) (Control) (Northern Ireland) Order 1973 (SI 1973/2131)
- Fuel and Electricity (Heating) (Control) (Northern Ireland) Order 1973 (SI 1973/2132)
- Electricity (Industrial and Commercial Use) (Control) (Northern Ireland) Order 1973 (SI 1973/2133)
- Electricity (Industrial and Commercial Use) (Control) (Amendment) Order 1973 (SI 1973/2137)
- Motor Vehicles (Compulsory Insurance) (No. 2) Regulations 1973 (SI 1973/2143)
- Electricity (Industrial and Commercial Use) (Control) (Second Amendment) Order 1973 (SI 1973/2146)
- Northern Ireland (Modification of Enactments—No. 1) Order 1973 (SI 1973/2163)
- Electricity (Industrial and Commercial Use) (Control) (No. 2) Order 1973 (SI 1973/2172)
- Electricity (Industrial and Commercial Use) (Control) (Amendment) (Northern Ireland) Order 1973 (SI 1973/2211)
- Royal Borough of Kensington and Chelsea (Wards) Order 1973 (SI 1973/2230)

== See also ==
- List of statutory instruments of the United Kingdom
