= Holderness Drain =

English water project

Coordinates: 53.7422°N 0.2867°W

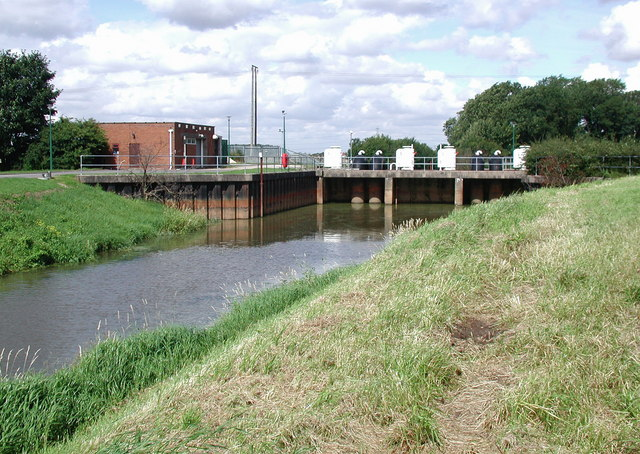
- The Great Culvert pumping station, maintained by the Environment Agency
- Interactive map of Holderness Drain

Specifications
- Status: operational

History
- Original owner: Holderness Drainage
- Principal engineer: John Grundy; William Jessop
- Date of act: 1764; 1787; 1832
- Date of first use: 1772

Geography
- Start point: NE of Burshill
- End point: Marfleet, Humber

Holderness Drain is the main feature of a land drainage scheme for the area of Holderness to the east of the River Hull in the East Riding of Yorkshire, England. Construction began in 1764, and several notable civil engineers were involved with the scheme over the years. Despite the high costs of the initial scheme, it was not particularly successful, because of the refusal of the ship owners of Hull to allow an outlet at Marfleet. They insisted that the water be discharged into the River Hull to keep the channel free of silt. Following a period of agricultural depression and the building of new docks in the early 1800s, an outlet at Marfleet was finally authorised in 1832. A high level system still fed upland water to the Hull, but the low level system discharged into the Humber, where levels were considerably lower. Following the success of steam pumping on the Beverley and Barmston Drain, the trustees looked at such a possibility for the Holderness Drain, but the development of the Alexandra Dock in the 1880s and then the King George V Dock in 1913 provided a solution, as the docks were topped up with water pumped from the drain, to lessen the ingress of silt-laden water.

Responsibility for the scheme rested with the Trustees of Holderness Drainage from its inception in 1764 until 1930, when a major overhaul of land drainage legislation took place. Since then it has been managed by a catchment board, a river board, a river authority, a water authority, the National Rivers Authority and the Environment Agency. Since 1930, the smaller drainage ditches that feed into the Holderness Drain have been the responsibility of an internal drainage board. In order to improve the efficiency of the system, pumping stations were built at Tickton, Great Culvert and East Hull in 1972. However, attitudes to land drainage have changed and the Tickton station is now deemed to be uneconomic, and will be closed down unless alternative sources of income to fund its operation can be found.

== History ==
The valley of the River Hull was regularly inundated with fresh water in the north, and salt water in the south in the early medieval period. Hamlets along the edges of the Humber and the Hull built banks to prevent the inundation by sea water in the early fourteenth century, as King Edward II appointed commissioners in 1311 and 1313, with responsibilities to inspect and repair the banks. However, the commissioners were only appointed when the walls were breached, and once repairs had been made, they were disbanded. There was no regular inspection of the banks. As well as preventing the ingress of sea water, the banks also prevented fresh water from the land reaching the Humber, and so a network of channels were cut, to channel water to the Hull and the Humber. Primitive sluices were built where the channels passed through the banks, to ensure that water only passed in one direction.

The carrs to the north remained flooded, although a number of channels were cut through them by the monks from Meaux Abbey. These ran in an east-west direction and were primarily to aid transport by boat, rather than for drainage, although their large size tended to have some effect on the land. A move towards a more comprehensive system of control occurred in 1532, with the passing of the Statute of Sewers. This created commissioners of sewers in the main areas of England and Wales which had significant areas of marshland. They had considerable powers, which were exercised through courts of sewers. Two such Courts were created in the Hull valley. One was based at Beverley, with separate juries for North, Middle and South Holderness and three other areas, while the second was based at Hull. They were initially only concerned with existing banks and drains, but in 1580 they organised the construction of a new drain to link Monkdike to Forthdike, providing a more southerly outlet for the water, where the level of the Hull was lower at low tide. An extensive survey of all the drains and banks was made between 1660 and 1662, with the details recorded in a book of pains, now held by the East Riding Record Office. Pains was the term used for records of the size of such structures, the intervals at which they had to be repaired or scoured, and the penalties for failing to carry out the repairs.

The idea of taking the waters from the carrs in the north to a new outlet near Marfleet on the Humber was suggested by Mr Snow in 1671. He was a Commissioner of Sewers, and proposed a new drain from Forthdike to Marfleet, passing to the east of Sutton, whose inhabitants had resisted previous attempts at a solution. Snow offered to cut the drain in return for use of the drained land for a period of 21 years, but he failed to obtain the consent of the landowners or an act of Parliament to authorise it. Sir Joseph Ashe made some improvements to his Wawne estate, which included cutting the Engine Drain, at the end of which he built two windmills to raise the water into the Hull. Others followed suit, and there were around a dozen drainage windmills in the area by the early 18th century.

=== First phase ===
Holderness Drainage Act 1764
- Act of Parliament
- Parliament of Great Britain
- Long title: An Act for draining, preserving, and improving, the Low Grounds and Carrs lying and being in the Parishes, Townships, Hamlets, Lordships, Precincts, and Territories, of Sutton, Ganstead, Swine, Benningholme, Benningholme Grange, and Fairholme, North Skirlaugh, Rowton, Arnold, Long Riston, Leven Heigholme, and Hallytree-Holme, Brandes-Burton, and Bursall, Eske, Tickton, Weel, Routh, Meaux, and Waghen otherwise Wawn, in Holderness, in the East Riding of the County of York.
- Citation: 4 Geo. 3. c. 47 Pr.
- Territorial extent: Great Britain

Dates
- Royal assent: 5 April 1764
- Commencement: 15 November 1763 (Note: Start of session.)
Other legislation
Amended by	Holderness Drainage Act 1832
Relates to	Holderness Drainage Act 1766

Status: Amended

Holderness Drainage Act 1766
- Act of Parliament
- Parliament of Great Britain
- Long title: An Act to render more effectual an Act made in the Fourth Year of His present Majesty, for draining, preserving, and improving, the Low Grounds and Carrs, lying and being in the Parishes, Townships; Hamlets, Lordships, Precincts, and Territories, of Sutton Ganstead, Swine Benningholme, Benningholme Grange, and Fairholme, North Skirlaugh, Rowtont Arnold, Long Riston, Leven Heigholme, and Hallytree Holme, Brandes Burton, and Burshall, Eske, Tickton, Weel, Routh, Meaux, and Waghen otherwise Wawn, in Holdernesse, in the East Riding of the County of York.
- Citation: 6 Geo. 3. c. 74 Pr.
- Territorial extent: Great Britain

Dates
- Royal assent: 14 May 1766
- Commencement: 17 December 1765
Other legislation
Amended by	Holderness Drainage Act 1832
Relates to	Holderness Drainage Act 1764

Status: Amended

Holderness Drainage Act 1772
- Act of Parliament
- Parliament of Great Britain
- Long title: An Act for draining the Low Grounds and Cam, lying in the several Parishes, Townships, and Places, of Keyingham, Keyingham Marsh, Ryhill and Camerton, Burstwick and Skeckling, Burton Pidsea and Ridgmont, Ottringham, Halsham, Owstwick, Ross, Rimswell, Tunstall, Waxholme, Elsternwick, Lelley, Humbleton, Fitling, Hilston, Garston, Albrough, Flinton, and Tansterne, within the Seigniory of Holderness and East Riding of the County of York.
- Citation: 12 Geo. 3. c. 64 Pr.
- Territorial extent: Great Britain

Dates
- Royal assent: 16 April 1772
- Commencement: 21 January 1772
Other legislation
Amended by	Holderness Drainage Act 1802

Status: Amended

Holderness Drainage Act 1802
- Act of Parliament
- Parliament of the United Kingdom
- Long title: An Act to repeal an Act, passed in the Twelfth Year of the Reign of His present Majesty King George the Third, intituled, "An Act for draining the Low Grounds and Carrs lying in the several Parishes, Townships, and Places of Keyingham, Keyingham-Marsh, Ryhill and Camerton, Burstwick and Skeckling, Burton-Pidsea and Ridgmont, Ottringham, Halsham, Owstwick, Rooss, Rimswell, Tunstall, Waxholme, Elsternwick, Lelley, Humbleton, Fitling, Hilston, Garton, Albrough, Flinton, and Tansterne, within the Seigniory of Holderness, and East Riding of the County of York;" and to render more effectual the Drainage of all and singular the Lands and Grounds within the said several Parishes, Townships, and Places, and within all other Townships, Hamlets, and Places within or Parcel or Member of the several Parishes mentioned, or any of them respectively.
- Citation: 42 Geo. 3. c. l
- Territorial extent: United Kingdom

Dates
- Royal assent: 7 May 1802
Other legislation
Amends	Holderness Drainage Act 1772

Status: Current legislation

Text of statute as originally enacted

In 1763, landowners decided that the carrs to the east of the River Hull could be turned into profitable land, and obtained an act of Parliament to exclude this area from the jurisdiction of the Court of Sewers. The act created Holderness Drainage, a legal entity with powers to construct new banks and drains. Plans for the drainage of Holderness were then put together. John Grundy, Jr. was approached to produce plans for the drainage of some 17.19 square miles (44.5 km^{2}) of low-lying land to the east of the River Hull. He worked with John Smeaton on the initial assessment, and the two men visited the area in November. There was significant opposition to his plans for the main outlet to be at Marfleet, since the shipping owners felt that the scouring action of the fresh water on the mud banks near the lower end of the Hull was vital to maintain the Old Harbour, as this part of the river was known. With limited financial resources, Holderness Drainage were unable to resist the pressure, and the plans were altered to have an outlet at Stoneferry on the Hull, and reduced dimensions for the drains. Grundy wrote the final report, completing it on 30 December. Smeaton then reviewed it, and suggested only minor modifications, as he was happy with all the major points. The land surveyor Charles Tate produced an engraved plan, and Grundy went to London to steer the bill for the scheme through Parliament. The bill became an act of Parliament, the Holderness Drainage Act 1764 (4 Geo. 3. c. 47 Pr.) on 5 April 1764.

Grundy's life was marked by tragedy shortly afterwards, when his wife of 21 years died, and remarkably personal letters between the two engineers have survived. Although busy with the Calder Navigation by then, Smeaton made the time to visit the area with Grundy on 4 July, in response to a request from the Trustees of the scheme to view the low grounds and carrs. Grundy produced a report on 14 July, and then designed the outfall sluice, which had two 10-foot (3.0 m) arches with sluices. Smeaton again reviewed the plans in September, suggesting improvements to the foundations, and this was his last involvement with the scheme. Grundy submitted his report on the sluice in December 1764, which included a detailed bill of quantities, with an estimated cost of £1,800.

It appears that Grundy had been acting as Chief Engineer since July 1764. In addition to the main drain, the scheme involved the construction of 17 miles (27 km) of barrier bank, on the east bank of the River Hull, to prevent inundation of the low-lying land from that source. Construction of the bank had begun in July 1764, with John Hoggard acting as superintendent of the works. In March 1765, work on the main sluice began, and bricklayers, carpenters and masons were employed. The resident engineer or 'surveyor' for this part of the work and for the construction of the main drain was Joseph Page, who was paid £80 per year. Throughout the contract, Charles Tate, who had produced the original engraved plan, worked as the land surveyor. Grundy in his capacity as Chief Engineer, visited the sites on four occasions in 1765, and continued to do so until October 1767, when the main drains and sluice were finished. Both he and Page then moved on, but work on the banks and drains continued under the supervision of Hoggard. By the time this first phase was completed in 1772, the cost had been around £24,000.

Some work continued until 1775, consisting largely of raising river banks, making drains deeper, and extending the drains that had been created. However, the system was inadequate, as there were large areas that remained under water near Leven, in the north of the area, and at Weel, to the east of Beverley. Flooding during the winter months was still a regular problem, because the drains could not cope with rain from the low-lying carrs, when they were full with water from higher ground to the north of Holderness. The engineer William Jessop spent a month investigating the problems, studying some 40 square miles (100 km^{2}), and presented a report in July 1786. Further survey work was then carried out by George Plummer, and formed the basis for Jessop's detailed plan, which was agreed in 1787. He produced specifications for drains, embankments, dams and tunnels, with the overriding principle that the water from the uplands to the north should be kept entirely separate from the internal drains of the area. Once the project got under way, Jessop visited from time to time to check on progress. He made a total of seven visits between 1789 and 1792, when his involvement and that of George Plummer, who had acted as resident engineer, ceased. Anthony Bower then took over as resident engineer, overseeing the work until 1795. This phase of the scheme was finally completed in 1805, at a cost of £16,000.

=== Second phase ===
Holderness Drainage Act 1832
- Act of Parliament
- Parliament of the United Kingdom
- Long title: An Act to alter and enlarge the Powers of Two Acts passed in the Fourth and Sixth Years of the Reign of His Majesty King George the Third, for draining and improving certain Low Grounds and Cars in Holderness in the East Riding of the County of York.
- Citation: 2 & 3 Will. 4. c. l
- Territorial extent: United Kingdom

Dates
- Royal assent: 23 May 1832
- Commencement: 23 May 1832 (Note: The Acts of Parliament (Commencement) Act 1793.)
Other legislation
Amends	Holderness Drainage Act 1764; Holderness Drainage Act 1766

Status: Current legislation

Text of statute as originally enacted

Despite the large amounts of money spent on the schemes, they were not particularly effective, because of the failure to provide an outfall at Marfleet. Ship owners continued to oppose such a plan until at least 1810, and there was an agricultural depression from 1815 to 1830. During this period, the port of Hull developed, with the opening of Humber Dock in 1809 and Junction Dock (later Princes Dock) in 1829. By the time the agricultural industry began to recover, the carrs were in a bad state, but so was the Old Harbour at Hull. Holderness Drainage acted quickly, obtaining the Holderness Drainage Act 1832 (2 & 3 Will. 4. c. l), which authorised the construction of a drain to Marfleet, where the outlet sluice (known locally as a clow) could be built at a lower level than previous outlets, thus providing a better gradient for the flow of the water. The old Main Drain was embanked where it crossed the carrs, and was used to carry runoff from the streams of Holderness to the Hull. The new lowland drain carried water from the carrs to Marfleet, passing under the upland drain in the Great Culvert. Where possible, old drains were made straighter, wider and deeper, and the meres in the Leven and Tickton area soon disappeared. By 1854, around one sixth of the land was still subject to occasional winter flooding, but most of the carrs were by then used for crops, rather than for pasture.

Flooding in the Holderness Level increased between 1840 and 1880, as farmers used tile drains to keep their land free of standing water. These carried the water away more quickly to the main drains, increasing the peak flow. Where this drained into the upland drain, this was not a problem, but where it entered the lowland drain, it caused difficulties, particularly when Marfleet was tide locked. Following the successful introduction of steam pumping on the Beverley and Barmston drain, to the west of the River Hull, the trustees looked at the possibility of installing pumps as Marfleet. However, help came from another source.

The Alexandra Dock was built to the west of the final section of the drain in the early 1880s. Research on the original Hull Dock had shown that around 1.25 million tons of mud were deposited in the dock each year, as a result of the muddy water of the Humber entering the dock for 2 to 3 hours at each high tide. In order to mitigate the high cost of dredging to remove this material, the water levels in the 46.5-acre (18.8 ha) dock were maintained by pumping fresh water from the Holderness Drain. Pumps capable of pumping 14.5 million cubic feet (410 Ml) per day were installed, resulting in significant savings in the cost of operating the dock. Pumping from the drain increased again in 1913, when the newly constructed King George V Dock opened, and again required clean water. For Holderness Drainage, this provided the benefits of pumping without the cost.

=== Administration ===
Holderness Drainage were responsible for the management of the system until the Land Drainage Act 1930 became law. This organised the low-lying areas of England and Wales into catchment areas, each with its own catchment board. These boards were responsible for the main rivers within a catchment basin. For the Holderness region, responsibility for the River Hull and the Holderness main drain passed to the Hull Catchment Board. Holderness Drainage then became an internal drainage board (IDB), with responsibility for the smaller drains. Responsibility changed again with the passing of the River Boards Act 1948, which created the Hull and East Yorkshire River Board. The next change occurred as a result of the Water Resources Act 1963, when the Hull River Board was joined to the Yorkshire Ouse River Board to become the Yorkshire Ouse and Hull River Authority. Further amalgamation and reorganisation took place following the passing of the Water Act 1973, when the river authority became part of the much larger Yorkshire Water Authority. Yorkshire Water Authority was privatised as a result of the Water Act 1989, and responsibility for main rivers including the Holderness Drain passed to the National Rivers Authority, which subsequently became part of the Environment Agency in 1995.

Similarly, the internal drainage boards have gradually amalgamated into larger units. The Holderness IDB first merged with the Beverley IDB, and subsequently with the Beverley and Barmstom IDB, to become the Beverley and North Holderness IDB in 1981. They are responsible for an area of 91.98 square miles (238.2 km^{2}) in which they maintain 163 miles (262 km) of drains, including those that feed into the Holderness Drain. Some 70 per cent of the area is dependent upon pumping stations to prevent flooding.

=== Development ===
Holderness Drain has three pumping stations along its length, which manage changes in level. The first is at Tickton, which was built in 1972 as part of the Holderness Drain scheme. The second is the Great Culvert pumping station, which was built at the same time. This is located close to the point of the original Great Culvert, which carried the high level drain to the River Hull over the low level drain to the Humber. Water from Monkdike and the Foredyke Stream was diverted into the low level drain, with the pumping station raising water from the remainder of the low level drain to the north. The rest of the Foredyke Stream, which carried the high level waters through the city to the River Hull at Stoneferry was abandoned. The East Hull pumping station, near the outlet of the Holderness Drain, has a capacity of 94,600 cubic metres per hour (3,340,000 cu ft/h), and is jointly managed by Yorkshire Water and the Environment Agency. It was originally constructed in 1949, so that the outflow from the drain could be pumped into the Humber when the level of the tides prevented gravity discharge. A major upgrade by Kingston upon Hull Corporation took place in May 1972, when it was extended to pump sewage flows into the Humber as well.

In 2010, the Environment Agency looked at the costs and effectiveness of the pumping stations, and concluded that only East Hull significantly reduced the risk of flooding to properties. Costs to run Tickton pumping station were about £20,000 per year, and it was decided to continue operating it for a further five years, while working with local communities to find other sources of funding for it. Although deemed uneconomic, Great Culvert pumping station would continue to be used, as removing it would result in water from the high level system flowing back up the Holderness Drain, increasing the risk of flooding. At the time, a £900,000 refurbishment scheme was being carried out at East Hull pumping station, and ways to increase its capacity were under investigation. Of the four pumps, the two 24-inch (61 cm) ones were refurbished first, followed by the two 48-inch (120 cm) ones. All of the pumps have been available for pumping water from the drain since 2006, when pumping of sewage was discontinued following the commissioning of Saltend Waste Water Treatment Works, and the 6.2-mile (10.0 km) deep level sewer that connects it to Hull's sewerage system.

As part of a £28.5 million flood alleviation scheme for Hull, the Environment Agency decided that the East Hull pumping station had reached the end of its life, and that constructing a new pumping station would be more economical than refurbishing it. Following a planning decision in April 2020, work started on the new structure in May, which is located to the south of the existing station, nearer to the Humber. Its four pumps can pump 350 cubic feet per second (10 m^{3}/s) in conditions where water levels in the drain are high and the tide in the Humber is also high. The Holderness Drain Flood Alleviation Scheme is a multi-agency project, jointly funded by the Environment Agency, Hull City Council, East Riding of Yorkshire Council, the Humber Local Enterprise Partnership and National Highways, and construction was completed in January 2024. Phase 2 of the project, to create a flood relief area to the east of Bransholme and Sutton near the Castle Monument, began in June 2022. The flood relief area is known as Castlehill Aquagreen, and is designed to remain dry under normal conditions. During flood events, it will store flood water, which will then be released back into Holderness Drain as conditions improve. This has been achieved by altering the flood banks of parts of East Carr Drain and Holderness Drain, and by re-aligning a section of Sutton Cross Drain. Most of the work was completed by December 2023, but some re-instatement work was delayed by wet conditions.

== Navigation ==
When the commissioners approached Jessop in 1786 they had asked him

"... to take a view of the works of the Drainage, and of the River Hull, and to report what measures (in his opinion) ought to be pursued to give the best effect to the undertaking; what will be the probable expence of those measures, whether a navigation be compatible with the drainage, and if it be, what additional expence would be required to effect a navigation (as well as a drainage) from the outfall to Monk bridge."

His report of 1786 had stated that a navigation might be an advantage to the drainage. He estimated that it would cost an additional £5,136 to make the main drain suitable for craft drawing 4.5 feet (1.4 m). The cost included a number of passing places, and the provision of two locks. However, the trustees did not take the plan any further. An independent group proposed a canal running parallel to the drain in September 1791, which would be navigable from near the Holderness outfall to Monk bridge, or to Leven, about 1 mile (1.6 km) further to the north. The drainage trustees were anxious to ensure that such a plan would not damage the drainage, and asked John Hudson of Louth to assess it in February 1792. The promoters then petitioned Parliament in March, but the plan foundered.

In 1799, Mrs Bethel asked Jessop to produce a plan for a canal running westwards from Leven to the River Hull. Jessop did so, and reported that the canal would not harm the drainage. However, the trustees were nervous, and asked Mrs Bethel to pay for a second opinion. She employed James Creassy, who agreed with Jessop, and with the blessing of the trustees, she obtained an act of Parliament, the Hull and Frodingham Beck Navigation Act 1801 (41 Geo. 3. (U.K.) c. cxxxiv). The act stipulated that Jessop and Creassy must agree that any work carried out would not harm the drainage, and if they could not agree, then they were to consult the engineer John Rennie. As a further measure, Mrs Bethel provided an indemnity against the canal damaging the drainage. The canal crossed the main Holderness Drain on an aqueduct.

== Bibliography ==
- Bates, Jacob; Cramp, David (10 June 2024). "Holderness Flood Alleviation Scheme (2024)". Water Projects online. Archived from the original on 2 July 2024.
- Coulson, Charles (2010) [1906]. Notes on Docks and Dock Construction (Nabu Public Domain Reprint ed.). London: Longmans, Green. ISBN 978-1-142-41196-1.
- Cross-Rudkin, Peter; Chrimes, Mike (2008). A Biographical Dictionary of Civil Engineers in Great Britain and Ireland: Vol 2: 1830 to 1890. Thomas Telford. ISBN 978-0-7277-3504-1.
- Dobson, Alban; Hull, Hubert (1931). The Land Drainage Act 1930. Oxford University Press.
- Environment Agency (12 May 2020). "Environment Agency Yorkshire starts new Hull pumping station". Archived from the original on 5 June 2020.
- Environment Agency (January 2024). "Holderness Drain Flood Alleviation Scheme (FAS) – Information Page". Archived from the original on 26 June 2024.
- Hadfield, Charles (1973). The Canals of Yorkshire and North East England (Vol 2). David and Charles. ISBN 978-0-7153-5975-4.
- Halcrow Group (2010). Draft River Hull Flood Risk Management Strategy. Environment Agency.
- HMSO (1963). "Water Resources Act 1963" (PDF). legislation.gov.uk.
- Jacobs (2006). "Consultation with Internal Drainage Boards" (PDF). Strategic Flood Risk Assessment. East Riding or Yorkshire Council. Archived from the original (PDF) on 26 August 2014.
- Porter, Elizabeth (1978). Water Management in England and Wales. Cambridge University Press. ISBN 978-0-521-21865-8.
- Reid, Ian; Harris, Joy; Walker, Colin (2014). Becks, Banks, Drains and Brains. East Riding of Yorkshire Council (River Hull Valley Drainage Heritage Group). ISBN 978-0-9552912-1-0.
- Sheppard, June A. (1976) [1958]. The Draining of the Hull Valley. East Yorkshire Local History Society. ISBN 0-900349-08-5. Archived from the original on 1 February 2020.
- Skempton, Sir Alec; et al. (2002). A Biographical Dictionary of Civil Engineers in Great Britain and Ireland: Vol 1: 1500 to 1830. Thomas Telford. ISBN 978-0-7277-2939-2.
- Wisdom, A. S. (1966). Land Drainage. London: Sweet & Maxwell.
