= Water Act 1989 =

Act of the Parliament of the United Kingdom

Water Act 1989 (Note: Section 194(1).)
- Act of Parliament
- Parliament of the United Kingdom
- Long title: An Act to provide for the establishment and functions of a National Rivers Authority and of committees to advise that Authority; to provide for the transfer of property, rights and liabilities of water authorities to the National Rivers Authority and to companies nominated by the Secretary of State and for the dissolution of those authorities; to provide for the appointment and functions of Director General of Water Services and the customer service committees; to provide for the companies to be appointed to be water undertakers and sewerage undertakers and for the regulation of the appointed companies; to make provision with respect to, and the finances of, nominated companies, holding companies of nominated companies and statutory water companies; to amend the law relating to the supply of water and the law relating to provisions of sewers and the treatment and disposal of sewage; to amend the law with respect to pollution of water and the law with respect to its abstraction from inland waters and underground strata; to make new provisions in relation to flood defence and fisheries; to transfer functions with respect to navigation, conservancy and harbours to the National rivers Authority; and for connected purposes.
- Citation: 1989 c. 15
- Territorial extent: United Kingdom (Note: Section 194(3)–(9).)

Dates
- Royal assent: 6 July 1989
- Commencement: 6 July 1989 (Note: Section 194(2).)
Other legislation
Amends	Landlord and Tenant Act 1927; Water Act 1945; Housing Act 1949; Town Development Act 1952; Manœuvres Act 1958; Public Health Act 1961; Water Resources Act 1963; London Government Act 1963; Gas Act 1965; Water Act 1973; Fair Trading Act 1973; Salmon and Freshwater Fisheries Act 1975; House of Commons Disqualification Act 1975; Restrictive Trade Practices Act 1976; Land Drainage Act 1976; Water (Scotland) Act 1980; Senior Courts Act 1981; Airports Act 1986
Repeals/revokes	Border Rivers (Prevention of Pollution) Act 1951; Water Resources Act 1971; Water Charges Act 1976; Drought Act 1976
Amended by	Capital Allowances Act 1990; Planning (Consequential Provisions) Act 1990; Water Consolidation (Consequential Provisions) Act 1991; Radioactive Substances Act 1993; Employment Tribunals Act 1996; Employment Rights Act 1996; Statute Law (Repeals) Act 1998; Postal Services Act 2000; Digital Markets, Competition and Consumers Act 2024
Relates to	Electricity Act 1989

Status: Amended

Text of statute as originally enacted

Text of the Water Act 1989 as in force today (including any amendments) within the United Kingdom, from legislation.gov.uk.

The Water Act 1989 (c. 15) is an act of the Parliament of the United Kingdom that reorganised the bodies responsible for all aspects of water within England and Wales. Whereas previous legislation, particularly the Water Act 1973, had focused on providing a single unifying body with responsibility for all water-related functions within a river basin or series of river basins, this legislation divided those functions up again, with water supply, sewerage and sewage disposal being controlled by private companies, and the river management, land drainage and pollution functions becoming the responsibility of the National Rivers Authority.

== Background ==
The concept of a unified authority with responsibility for all of the water-related functions within a river basin or series of river basins dates from the late nineteenth century. A river conservancy bill was introduced into Parliament in 1878 by the Duke of Richmond, and the Council of the Society of Arts offered medals to those who could devise suitable watershed districts to aid such conservancy. A silver medal was awarded to Frederick Toplis for his plan to create 12 watershed districts, which covered similar areas to the water authorities created under the Water Act 1973. Each district would be run by commissioners, with powers to acquire all of the waterworks within their area, and to manage both them and the rivers for water supply and the prevention of flooding and pollution. He wrote that "every drop of water falling on their district should be more or less under their control from the time it falls on the land until it reaches the sea."

Toplis's far-sighted ideas were not implemented immediately, but the first moves towards more widespread management of river basins in England and Wales were enshrined in the Land Drainage Act 1930. Although this was primarily concerned with flood prevention and land drainage, it created catchment boards with responsibility for the management of main rivers, and each was based around a river basin or group of river basins. The catchment boards only covered parts of England and Wales, but this changed in 1948, when the River Boards Act 1948 created 32 river boards. Where catchment boards existed, their powers were inherited by the river boards, and where they did not, they took over responsibility for flood prevention from local authorities. The river boards had additional responsibilities concerning fisheries, the prevention of pollution and the gauging of rivers. They were in turn replaced by 27 river authorities following the passing of the Water Resources Act 1963, each with additional duties to monitor water quality and protect water resources.

The development of a national water supply policy occurred in parallel with these developments. The Water Act 1945 had recognised the need for central government to supervise the statutory suppliers of water, and to be involved in the difficult issues of water supply. It had also recognised that the supply of water to non-domestic consumers was part of an integrated policy, and had introduced the concept of abstraction licensing. In many areas, pollution of rivers by sewage was a serious problem, resulting from rapid expansion of population, and little incentive to invest in sewage treatment works. The Rivers (Prevention of Pollution) Act 1951 introduced discharge licensing, and with extra powers from a similar Act of 1961, tried to encourage local authorities to invest more in such works, but the Working Party on Sewage Disposal, which reported in 1970, concluded that there were over 3000 sewage treatment works which were performing inadequately.

The Water Act 1973 created ten regional water authorities, covering England and Wales. They had responsibility for water supply, sewerage, sewage treatment, flood prevention, land drainage, the prevention of pollution, fisheries, and water abstraction. While it appeared that all water management functions were now handled by one body, and that Toplis's vision had been realised, Porter wrote in 1978 that this might not be the final word on water management, as the 1963 Act, which had been declared "a giant step forward in England's response to contemporary water problems" had only lasted for ten years.

== Development ==
Having taken over so many different organisations, each with their own management structure, the water authorities were faced with the difficult task of creating a single structure. The Secretary of State for the Environment had appointed the Management Structure Committee in 1972, which suggested a two-tier approach, with a regional headquarters and smaller divisional units. The authorities tended to retain the existing structures at first, with divisions for water supply, based on the statutory water suppliers, river divisions, based on the former river authorities, and new divisions for sewage treatment, since the treatment of sewage had been much more fragmented than the other functions. The Severn Trent Authority were the first to fully implement the two-tier approach.

It soon became obvious that the water industry was faced by ageing infrastructure and chronic under-investment, but there was little public or political enthusiasm for large increases in water bills to pay for change. There was also a problem with pollution, where the same authority was responsible for sewage treatment and river quality and were unlikely to prosecute themselves for quality breaches. The Water Act 1983 sought to change the organisational structures of the authorities, reducing the huge numbers of local authority representatives, to create boards that were more like those found in private industry. A river quality survey carried out in 1985 showed that river quality was still deteriorating, and an audit of sewage treatment plants published in 1988 found that 742 out of 6,407 infringed their discharge limits.

The government of the time were unwilling to fund the level of investment needed to turn the situation around and following the privatisation of British Telecom in 1984 and British Gas in 1986, looked at that option as a potential solution to the funding gap. They published a discussion paper in 1986, which suggested that the water authorities should become private companies, with little change to their responsibilities. However, they suggested that some external regulation was necessary, as performance judged purely on price could be achieved by reductions in water quality. The water industry was somewhat different to telecoms and gas, in that there was no national distribution network, and regulation of the environment worked against making profits. The paper was put on hold after six months.

With a general election scheduled to take place in 1987, the Conservative Party manifesto included their intent to privatise the water industry. The main difference between their plans and the previous discussion paper was the removal of pollution control, land drainage and flood protection from the remit of the companies. Instead, these responsibilities would be handled by a new National Rivers Authority (NRA), with the water companies concentrating on water supply and distribution, sewerage and sewage disposal. This proposal formed the basis for the 1989 Act.

== Privatisation ==
The act became law on 6 July 1989. Under it, the existing water authorities became water and sewerage companies, registered with Companies House under the terms of the Companies Act 1985. The act also specified that responsibility for the regulation of the quality of drinking water was with the Secretary of State for the Environment, it defined the role of the National Rivers Authority for the management of pollution and environmental control, and established the Director General of Water Services as the economic regulator. The companies were incorporated and registered at Companies House on 1 April 1989. Although most of England and Wales was covered by the ten water and sewerage companies, there were still 29 separate statutory water companies, covering clean water services only, predominantly based in the south-east of England.

A system of economic regulation was required, to ensure that water bills did not escalate out of control. The act recognised the history of under-investment, and the need to improve water quality and wastewater quality up to the levels specified by EC directives. Price limits were set by the Secretaries of State for the Environment and for Wales, with this duty being taken over by the Director General of Water Services after ten years. The system used was known as RPI + K, where the K-factor specified the maximum percentage by which charges could be increased. Its calculation was quite complex, and included a judgement on potential operating and capital efficiencies that could be made by each company. Prior to privatisation, the water authorities had to produce investment plans, based on the condition of their fixed assets, such as water treatment works, sewage treatment works, pipelines and sewers, and the likely levels of expenditure needed over the following 20 years. These were known as asset management plans.

In order to make the flotation viable, the government wrote off £7.6 billion of debts owed by the water and sewerage companies, provided a 'green dowry' which added £2.3 billion to their balance sheets, and provided a capital tax allowance of £12 billion to offset the fact that they had had no time to build up capital reserves. (All prices are at 2003/4 levels) At privatisation, 2,183 million water shares were on offer, priced at £2.40 each, and the offer was over-subscribed by a factor of 2.8. The sale raised £7.6 billion, which when offset against the written-off debts, meant that there was no net gain to the treasury.

The water and sewerage companies formed under the act were Anglian Water, Dŵr Cymru Welsh Water, Northumbrian Water, North West Water, Severn Trent Water, Southern Water, South West Water, Thames Water, Wessex Water and Yorkshire Water.

== Bibliography ==
- Faolex (1989). "Water Act 1989". Faolex legislative database.
- HMSO (1991). "Water Act 1989 - original text" (PDF). HMSO.
- Ofwat (2006). "The Development of the Water Industry in England and Wales" (PDF). OFWAT. Archived from the original (PDF) on 4 June 2015.
- Porter, Elizabeth (1978). Water Management in England and Wales. Cambridge University Press. ISBN 978-0-521-21865-8.
- Wisdom, A S (1966). Land Drainage. London: Sweet & Maxwell.
