= Land Drainage Act 1961 =

Act of the Parliament of the United Kingdom

Land Drainage Act 1961 (Note: Section 54(1).)
- Act of Parliament
- Parliament of the United Kingdom
- Long title: An Act to enable river boards and catchment boards to raise drainage charges for the purpose of meeting part of their expenses; and to make further provision relating to the drainage of land and to drainage boards.
- Citation: 9 & 10 Eliz. 2. c. 48
- Territorial extent: England and Wales (Note: Section 54(3).)

Dates
- Royal assent: 27 July 1961
- Commencement: 27 July 1961 (Note: The Acts of Parliament (Commencement) Act 1793.)
- Repealed: 1 January 1977 (Note: The Land Drainage (Amendment) Act 1976 (Commencement) Order 1976 (SI 1976/2244).)

Other legislation
- Amends: Local Government Act 1929; Land Drainage Act 1930; Agriculture (Miscellaneous War Provisions) Act 1940; Agriculture (Miscellaneous Provisions) Act 1943; River Boards Act 1948
- Amended by: Drainage Rates Act 1962; Water Resources Act 1963; Statute Law (Repeals) Act 1974
- Repealed by: Land Drainage Act 1976
- Relates to: Thames Conservancy Act 1950

Status: Repealed

Text of statute as originally enacted

The Land Drainage Act 1961 (9 & 10 Eliz. 2. c. 48) was an act of the Parliament of the United Kingdom which provided mechanisms for river boards to raise additional finance to fund their obligations. It built upon the provisions of the Land Drainage Act 1930 (20 & 21 Geo. 5. c. 44) and the River Boards Act 1948 (11 & 12 Geo. 6. c. 32).

== Background ==
Prior to the 1930s, land drainage in the United Kingdom was regulated by the Statute of Sewers (23 Hen. 8. c. 5), passed by King Henry VIII in 1531, and several further acts which built upon that foundation. However, there was some dissatisfaction with these powers, as the administrative bodies responsible for the drainage of low-lying areas had insufficient resources to do this effectively. A royal commission was convened to review the situation, and produced a final report on 5 December 1927. This formed the basis for a bill which became the Land Drainage Act 1930 (20 & 21 Geo. 5. c. 44) on 1 August 1930. It created catchment boards, with overall authority for some of the main rivers of England and Wales, and internal drainage boards which would manage the drainage of smaller areas. For the first time since the passing of the Statute of Sewers by King Henry VIII in 1531, the funding of drainage activities was not restricted solely to those whose land or property would be flooded without the work of the authority. Catchment boards could levy rates on the county councils and county borough councils throughout their entire catchment, not just on the low-lying parts of it, and could also levy rates on the internal drainage boards within their area.

The royal commission had identified one hundred catchment areas, based on the main rivers of England and Wales. When the Act was published, it contained only 47 catchment areas. This was altered by the passing of the River Boards Act 1948 (11 & 12 Geo. 6. c. 32), which defined thirty-two river board areas, covering almost the whole of England and Wales, and created a river board for each one. The Boards inherited the land drainage, fisheries and river pollution functions of the catchment boards.

== Provisions ==
The act addressed a number of issues that arose from the change from catchment boards to river boards, particularly in the area of finance. It became an act of Parliament on 27 July 1961, with the full title "An Act to enable river boards and catchment boards to raise drainage charges for the purpose of meeting part of their expenses; and to make further provision relating to the drainage of land and to drainage boards." It consisted of 54 sections, organised into four parts, and two schedules, the first containing minor amendments to the Land Drainage Act 1930 (20 & 21 Geo. 5. c. 44) and the River Boards Act 1948 (11 & 12 Geo. 6. c. 32), with the second listing parts of previous legislation which had been repealed.

Part 1 covered drainage charges. Under the 1930 act, internal drainage boards could raise finance by a levy on the owners of agricultural land and buildings within their area, and the catchment board could levy the internal drainage board. Section 1 allowed the river board to raise a similar levy or general drainage charge payable by owners of agricultural land and buildings which were within the river board area, but were not within an area managed by an internal drainage board. The provision also applied to the Conservators of the River Thames and the River Lee Catchment Board, as both organisations continued to operate under the provisions of the 1930 act, rather than the 1948 act.

Part 2 covered miscellaneous provisions. It allowed a river board to charge a local authority for the services it provided, where those services had been transferred from the local authority as a result of the 1948 Act. The Act simplified the situation where drainage works were required. River boards could effectively act as an internal drainage board, and assume to powers which applied to one. Before the legislation, this could only be achieved by creating a new internal drainage district with its own board, and then petitioning the Minister of Agriculture, Food and Fisheries to transfer its functions to the river board. It also allowed the minister, upon receipt of a petition, to create a new internal drainage board and give it the powers of the river board, where they had previously acted in this capacity. Section 19 widened the scope of river boards, which had been restricted to work in connection with main rivers. They were now allowed to carry out work which would improve defences against flooding by seawater or tidal water anywhere within their areas. There was also provision for the drainage of small areas by a river board, county council or county borough council where the creation of an internal drainage board was impracticable, while section 41 allowed river boards to insure their members against accidents, which they had previously not been able to do.

Part 3 covered the restoration and improvement of ditches. It allowed anyone who owned land which could not be properly drained because of the condition of a ditch which was not part of that land to apply to the Agricultural Land Tribunal for an order to improve the ditch. Such an order would name the person responsible for carrying out the work, which might be another landowner, or a drainage board. Finally, part 4 contained some supplementary provisions. In particular, it clarified the position of the Conservators of the River Thames and the Lee Conservancy Catchment Board, which had continued to act as catchment boards under the terms of the 1930 act. The land drainage functions specified by that Act had been removed from river boards by the 1948 act, and section 51 ensured that the powers of the 1961 act also applied to the two catchment boards.

== Subsequent developments ==
The provisions of the act were short-lived, since river boards, which were its primary focus, were swept away by the Water Resources Act 1963, which replaced the thirty-two river boards with twenty-seven river authorities. The anomaly of the Conservators of the River Thames and the Lee Conservancy Catchment Board was resolved by effectively making them into river authorities. Although it became law on 31 July 1963, the change from boards to authorities did not actually occur until 1 April 1965.

Sections 44 and 54(2) of, and schedule 2 to, the act, together with paragraphs 1, 9, 15 and 16 of schedule 1, were repealed by section 1 of, and part XI of the schedule to, the Statute Law (Repeals) Act 1974, which came into force on 27 June 1974.

The whole act was repealed by section 117(3) of, and schedule 8 to, the Land Drainage Act 1976, which came into force on 1 January 1977.

== Bibliography ==
- Anon (10 December 1932). "Land Drainage". Nature. 130 (3293): 875. Bibcode:1932Natur.130Q.875.. doi:10.1038/130875a0.
- Dobson, Alban; Hull, Hubert (1931). The Land Drainage Act 1930. Oxford University Press.
- Williams, Michael (1970). The Draining of the Somerset Levels. Cambridge: Cambridge University Press. ISBN 978-0-521-07486-5.
- Wisdom, A S (1966). Land Drainage. London: Sweet & Maxwell.
