= Salmon and Freshwater Fisheries Act 1975 =

Act of the Parliament of the United Kingdom

Salmon and Freshwater Fisheries Act 1975 (Note: Section 43(1).)
- Act of Parliament
- Parliament of the United Kingdom
- Long title: An Act to consolidate the Salmon and Freshwater Fisheries Act 1923 and certain other enactments relating to salmon and freshwater fisheries, and to repeal certain obsolete enactments relating to such fisheries.
- Citation: 1975 c. 51
- Territorial extent: England and Wales (Note: Section 43(2).)

Dates
- Royal assent: 1 August 1975
- Commencement: 1 August 1975 (Note: Section 43(4).)
Other legislation
| Amends | See § Repealed enactments |
| Repeals/revokes | See § Repealed enactments |
| Amended by | Fishery Limits Act 1976; Fisheries Act 1981; Salmon Act 1986; Water Act 1989; Water Consolidation (Consequential Provisions) Act 1991; Radioactive Substances Act 1993; Environment Act 1995; Marine and Coastal Access Act 2009; Environmental Permitting (England and Wales) (Amendment) Regulations 2011; Natural Resources Body for Wales (Functions) Order 2013; Environmental Permitting (England and Wales) Regulations 2016 |

Status: Amended

Text of statute as originally enacted

Revised text of statute as amended

Text of the Salmon and Freshwater Fisheries Act 1975 as in force today (including any amendments) within the United Kingdom, from legislation.gov.uk.

The Salmon and Freshwater Fisheries Act 1975 (c. 51) is an act of the Parliament of the United Kingdom to protect salmon and trout from commercial poaching, to protect migration routes, to prevent wilful vandalism and neglect of fisheries, ensure correct licensing and water authority approval. This helps to sustain the rural inland freshwater fisheries industry, which employs around 37,000 people in the UK.

== Background ==
The United Kingdom has a long history of legislation designed to regulate rivers and their associated fisheries, beginning with a clause in Magna Carta, concerning the removal of weirs from the River Thames and River Medway, to benefit both navigation and fisheries. Edward I legislated that there should be a gap in weirs on the rivers Eden, Esk and Derwent, through which "a sow and her five little pigs can enter", to allow fish to migrate along the rivers, and introduced a close season during which salmon could not be removed from rivers in his Statute of Westminster dating from 1285. A parliamentary select committee was convened in 1825, to consider the salmon fisheries of the United Kingdom. Its remit was to report on the state of the fisheries, and the legislation that affected them, but it did not result in any action being taken.

There was a general perception that fish stocks were depleting, as a result of the Industrial Revolution, and a Royal Commission was set up in 1860, with a remit ...to enquire into the Salmon Fisheries of England and Wales, with the view of increasing the supply of a valuable article of food for the benefit of the public... While many of its findings were similar to those of the Select Committee, the subsequent legislation sought to address confusion and uncertainty about what the law was. The Salmon Fishery Act 1861 (24 & 25 Vict. c. 109) therefore repealed thirty-three previous acts of Parliament, and sought to bring all the legislation together in one act, which also implemented some of the findings of the Royal Commission. The act was amended in a piecemeal fashion to include most of the rest of the findings through acts passed in 1865, 1873, 1878, 1884 and 1907, by which time most of the legislation applied to all freshwater fish, and not just to salmon and trout.

By 1923, the situation was similar to that which had prompted the passing of the 1861 act, as that act had been amended by a total of 18 more, and so the Salmon and Freshwater Fisheries Act 1923 (13 & 14 Geo. 5. c. 16) again repealed all previous fishery legislation, and sought to gather it all together in one Act. Local Fishery Boards had first been appointed in 1861, and their powers had been extended by various acts, while boards were also created for rivers that contained freshwater fish, but not game fish such as trout and salmon. Major changes in the administration of fisheries took place, with the passing of the River Boards Act 1948 (11 & 12 Geo. 6. c. 32). Of the 53 Fishery Boards that had existed in 1894, only 45 were still functioning by 1948, and the new legislation transferred the responsibility for fisheries to 32 river boards, which were also responsible for land drainage and the prevention of pollution. The Fishery Boards had been funded by fishing licences, but the river boards could also raise funds from precepts on county councils and county borough councils within their area.

The 1923 act has been amended by a number of minor reforms, and in 1961 the Blediscoe Committee met "...to review the Salmon and Freshwater Fishery Acts 1923-35 and their operation, taking into account the provisions of the River Boards Act 1948, and to make recommendations..." The extensive report that the committee produced contained 150 recommendations, and formed the basis for much of the subsequent legislation. River boards were replaced by river authorities as a result of the Water Resources Act 1963. They inherited the functions of the river boards, with added responsibilities for the conservation of water resources, and a central Water Resources Board was also created. The management of water was restructured again by the Water Act 1973, which replaced river authorities with ten regional water authorities, nine in England and one in Wales. Some of the Blediscoe recommendations were implemented by an act of 1964, which dealt with the use of seine or draft nets, and by an act of 1965, which prohibited the use of explosives, poisons or electrical devices and the destroying of dams. Another 30 recommendations were implemented by the Salmon and Freshwater Fisheries Act 1972.

== Provisions ==
In common with the acts of 1861 and 1923, the act repealed all of the previous legislation, and combined its contents into a single new Act. The legislation repealed included the Salmon and Freshwater Fisheries Acts of 1923, 1935, 1965 and 1972, and the Salmon and Freshwater Fisheries (Amendment) Act of 1929. It also made minor changes to the Water Resources Act 1963, the Compulsory Purchase Act 1965, the Water Act 1973 and the Control of Pollution Act 1974.

=== Law sections 1 – 31 and onwards ===
Section 1 - Prohibits the taking or killing of salmon or trout, or assisting thereof, by the use of tools such as a firearms, light, otter lath, small boat, jack, wire, spear, gaff or snare, or any pre-designed method of foul-hooking fish or strategies to catch fish with unattended baited hooks, such as cross-line, set-line, lay-line, stroke-haul or snatch.

Section 2 - Prohibits the taking of salmon or trout roe (fish eggs) or young fish. It is also an offence to purposely disturb spawn or spawning fish, unless permission is obtained previously in writing from the water authority for a private fishery to do so for the purpose of artificial propagation.

Section 3 - Prohibits the taking of salmon or trout using over-sized nets. Nets allowed must give the fish a reasonable chance of escaping.

Section 4 - Prohibits the killing of salmon or trout by toxic poisoning or polluting effluent.

Section 5 - Prohibits the killing of salmon or trout by use of explosives.

Section 6 - Prohibits the use of a fixed engine in waterways containing salmon or trout.

Section 7 - Prohibits the use of or altering of a weir, in order to obtain strategic advantage in the catching of salmon or trout.

Section 8 - Prohibits the use of or altering of a mill dams, in order to obtain strategic advantage in the catching of salmon or trout.

Section 9 to 15 - It is the duty of the waterway owner that when constructing dams, screens or sluices to provide and maintain a facilitating fish pass for migrating salmon or trout. These must remain undisturbed and unfished by everyone. Fish passes must be altered by any way the water authority wishes.

Section 16 - Prohibits the use of boxes or cribs in weirs and mill dams.

Section 17 & 18 - Prohibits the taking of salmon or trout above or below a natural or artificial obstruction.

Section 19 & 20 - Prohibits the taking of salmon or trout in a specified closed season.

Section 21 - Prohibits the use of eel baskets.

Section 22 - Prohibits the sale of salmon or trout between 31 August to 1 February.

Section 23 - Prohibits the export of salmon or trout unless previously approved by HM Customs and Excise.

Section 24 - Prohibits consignments of salmon or trout.

Section 25 to 29 - Details licences required for the fishing and keeping of salmon or trout.

Section 30 - Prohibits the introduction or intended introduction of any fish (or spawn) into an inland water, unless permission and written consent of the Regional water company is obtained beforehand.

Section 31 onwards - Details administration and enforcement of this law.

=== Repealed enactments ===
Section 42(1) of the act repealed 9 enactments, listed in the fifth schedule to the act.

| Citation | Short title | Extent of repeal |
|---|---|---|
| 13 & 14 Geo. 5. c. 16 | Salmon and Freshwater Fisheries Act 1923 | The whole act. |
| 19 & 20 Geo. 5. c. 39 | Salmon and Freshwater Fisheries (Amendment) Act 1929 | The whole act. |
| 25 & 26 Geo. 5. c. 43 | Salmon and Freshwater Fisheries Act 1935 | The whole act. |
| 1963 c. 38 | Water Resources Act 1963 | In section 71(6), the words "the Salmon and Freshwater Fisheries Act 1923 or by". In section 126(1), the words "the Salmon and Freshwater Fisheries Acts 1923 to 1972, and". |
| 1965 c. 56 | Compulsory Purchase Act 1965 | In Schedule 6, the entry relating to the Salmon and Freshwater Fisheries Act 1923. |
| 1965 c. 68 | Salmon and Freshwater Fisheries Act 1965 | The whole act. |
| 1972 c. 37 | Salmon and Freshwater Fisheries Act 1972 | The whole act. |
| 1973 c. 37 | Water Act 1973 | Section 18. Section 40(4)(c). In Schedule 8, paragraphs 1 to 19 and paragraphs 95 to 97. |
| 1974 c. 40 | Control of Pollution Act 1974 | In Schedule 3, paragraph 5. |

== Bibliography ==
- Ayton, Warwick (June 1998). Salmon Fisheries in England and Wales (PDF). The Atlantic Salmon Trust. ISBN 978-1-870875-52-3.
- Howarth, William (1987). Freshwater Fishery Law. Financial Training Publications. ISBN 978-1-85185-030-3.
- Wisdom, A S (1966). Land Drainage. London: Sweet & Maxwell.
