= Commissions of Sewers Act 1708 =

Act of the Parliament of Great Britain

Commissions of Sewers Act 1708 (Note: The citation of this act by this short title was authorised by section 1 of, and the first schedule to, the Short Titles Act 1896. Due to the repeal of those provisions it is now authorised by section 19(2) of the Interpretation Act 1978.)
- Act of Parliament
- Parliament of Great Britain
- Long title: An Act for rendring more effectual the Laws concerning Commissions of Sewers. (Note: These words are printed against this act in the second column of the first schedule to the Short Titles Act 1896, which is headed "Title".)
- Citation: 7 Ann. c. 33 (Note: This is the citation in The Statutes of the Realm); 7 Ann. c. 10 (Note: This is the citation in The Statutes at Large)
- Territorial extent: Great Britain

Dates
- Royal assent: 21 April 1709
- Commencement: 25 March 1709 (Note: Section 1.)
- Repealed: 1 August 1930

Other legislation
- Repealed by: Land Drainage Act 1930
- Relates to: Statute of Sewers

Status: Repealed

Text of statute as originally enacted

The Commissions of Sewers Act 1708 (7 Ann. c. 33), sometimes called the Commissioners of Sewers Act 1708, was an act of the Parliament of Great Britain. It concerned the duties of boards of commissioners with responsibility for the maintenance of sea banks and other defences, which protected low-lying areas from inundation by the sea, and the removal of obstructions in streams and rivers caused by mills, weirs and gates. The word sewer had a much broader meaning than in modern usage, and referred generally to streams and watercourses.

The main legislation dealing with land drainage in Britain was the Statute of Sewers (23 Hen. 8. c. 5), which had been passed by King Henry VIII in 1531, and sought to make the powers of various commissions of sewers permanent, whereas previously, each parliament had to renew their powers. Amendments had been made during the reigns of Edward VI and Elizabeth I, and the act passed during the reign of Queen Anne was similar, in that it left the main powers of Henry's act in place.

== Subsequent developments ==
The whole act was repealed by section 83(1) of, and the seventh schedule to, the Land Drainage Act 1930 (20 & 21 Geo. 5. c. 44), which came into force on 1 August 1930 although any commissioners acting under the powers of the 1708 act were deemed to be a properly-constituted internal drainage board under the terms of the new act. There were 49 commissions of sewers still operative when the 1930 act was passed.

== Bibliography ==
- Halsbury's Statutes
- Dobson, Alban; Hull, Hubert (1931). The Land Drainage Act 1930. Oxford University Press.
- Wheeler, William Henry; Batty, Leonard Charles (1897). A History of the Fens of South Lincolnshire. Boston: J M Newcomb. ISBN 978-1-241-32839-9. (British Library reprint)
