= Water Resources Act 1963 =

Act of the Parliament of the United Kingdom

Water Resources Act 1963 (Note: Section 163(1).)
- Act of Parliament
- Parliament of the United Kingdom
- Long title: An Act to provide for the establishment of river authorities and a Water Resources Board, to confer on them, and on the Minister of Housing and Local Government, new functions in relation to water resources in England and Wales, and to provide for the transfer to river authorities of functions previously exercisable by river boards and other bodies; to make further provision for controlling the abstraction and impounding of water, for imposing charges in respect of licences to abstract or impound water, and for securing the protection and proper use of inland waters and water in underground strata; to enable corresponding provision to be made in relation to the Thames and Lee catchment areas and certain other areas in or adjacent to London; and for purposes connected with the matters aforesaid.
- Citation: 1963 c. 38
- Territorial extent: England and Wales (Note: Section 163(2) and 163(3).)

Dates
- Royal assent: 31 July 1963
- Commencement: 31 July 1963 (Note: The Acts of Parliament (Commencement) Act 1793.)

Other legislation
- Amends: Electricity (Supply) Act 1919; Salmon and Freshwater Fisheries Act 1923; Electricity (Supply) Act 1926; Reservoirs (Safety Provisions) Act 1930; Local Government Superannuation Act 1937; Water Act 1945; Electricity Act 1947; Water Act 1948; Coast Protection Act 1949; National Parks and Access to the Countryside Act 1949; Rivers (Prevention of Pollution) Act 1951; Reserve and Auxiliary Forces (Protection of Civil Interests) Act 1951; Town Development Act 1952; Coastal Flooding (Emergency Provisions) Act 1953; Protection of Birds Act 1954; Opencast Coal Act 1958; Town and Country Planning Act 1959; Radioactive Substances Act 1960; Clean Rivers (Estuaries and Tidal Waters) Act 1960; Land Drainage Act 1961; Rivers (Prevention of Pollution) Act 1961; Trustee Investments Act 1961; Sea Fish Industry Act 1962; Transport Act 1962; Pipe-lines Act 1962
- Repeals/revokes: River Boards Act 1948
- Amended by: Science and Technology Act 1965; Compulsory Purchase Act 1965; General Rate Act 1967; Sea Fish (Conservation) Act 1967; Water Resources Act 1968; Town and Country Planning Act 1971; Water Act 1973; House of Commons Disqualification Act 1975; Salmon and Freshwater Fisheries Act 1975; Acquisition of Land Act 1981; Statute Law (Repeals) Act 1986; Channel Tunnel Act 1987; Water Act 1989; Water Consolidation (Consequential Provisions) Act 1991

Status: Partially repealed

Text of statute as originally enacted

Revised text of statute as amended

Text of the Water Resources Act 1963 as in force today (including any amendments) within the United Kingdom, from legislation.gov.uk.

The Water Resources Act 1963 (c. 38) is an act of the Parliament of the United Kingdom that continued the process of creating an integrated management structure for water, which had begun with the passing of the Land Drainage Act 1930 (20 & 21 Geo. 5. c. 44). It created river authorities and a Water Resources Board. River authorities were responsible for conservation, re-distribution and augmentation of water resources in their area, for ensuring that water resources were used properly in their area, or were transferred to the area of another river authority. The river authorities covered the areas of one or more of the river boards created under the River Boards Act 1948 (11 & 12 Geo. 6. c. 32), and inherited their duties and responsibilities, including those concerned with fisheries, the prevention of pollution, and the gauging of rivers. It did not integrate the provision of public water supply into the overall management of water resources, but it introduced a system of charges and licenses for water abstraction, which enabled the river authorities to allocate water to potential users. This included the water supply agencies, who now needed their supplies to be licensed.

== Scope ==
The legislation made provision for a "first appointed day", on which the river authorities would come into existence, and this was set on 15 October 1964, as a result of the River Authorities (First Appointed Day) Order 1964. A River Authorities (Second Appointed Day) Order 1964 established 1 April 1965 as the day on which the new authorities would take over the responsibilities of the previous River Boards, which would then cease to exist. The River Boards Act 1948, under which they had been established, was also repealed on that day. Under the new legislation, twenty-seven River Authorities replaced the 32 existing River Boards. As well as inheriting land drainage, fisheries and the prevention of pollution functions, the new authorities were given additional duties to monitor water quality and protect water resources. They thus became responsible for inland waters and the underground strata which existed within their area. The act made special provision for the Thames Conservancy Catchment Board and the Lee Conservancy Catchment Board, enabling them to act as if they were river authorities and their catchment areas were river authority areas. There was also special provision for parts of London, defined as the London excluded area under section 125 of the act.

The act consisted of 137 sections organised into ten parts. Part 1 outlined the functions of Ministers in relation to water resources. Part 2 dealt with the setting up of River Authorities and the Water Resources Board. Part 3 covered the assessment of water resources. Part 4 dealt with the abstraction and impounding of water, while part 5 dealt with charges for abstraction and impounding of water. The powers of River Authorities in relation to land were covered by part 6, while part 7 outlined additional functions of River Authorities. Part 8 dealt with financial considerations, part 9 detailed the transfer of undertakings of River Boards, and part 10 covered miscellaneous and supplementary provisions. This was followed by 14 schedules.

While the Water Act 1945 (8 & 9 Geo. 6. c. 42) had introduced the concept of a national policy for water, it had not provided the means to achieve one, but this was addressed by the formation of the Water Resources Board. This was a national organisation, which was independent of central government, and was responsible for the collection of data, research, and planning. Although it had no statutory powers over the River Authorities, it influenced their actions through negotiation, and was very successful in this. It produced three major reports on water resources between 1966 and 1971, in which it foresaw the need for transfers of water between rivers, and in some cases, between regions. Its final report, Water Resources in England and Wales, published in early 1974, outlined strategies for ensuring an adequate water supply for the next 25 years. In the consultation leading up to the Water Act 1973, it was argued that the Water Resources Board should be empowered to undertake major projects in its own right, but when the act was passed, the Board was disbanded and its functions were dispersed among other agencies.

The twenty-seven river authorities were detailed in schedule 1 of the act.

River Authority	Former River Boards
Northumbrian	Northumberland and Tyneside RB, Wear and Tees RB
Yorkshire Ouse and Hull	Hull and East Yorkshire RB, Yorkshire Ouse RB
Trent	Trent RB
Lincolnshire	Lincolnshire RB
Welland and Nene	Welland RB, Nene RB
Great Ouse	Great Ouse RB
East Suffolk and Norfolk	East Suffolk and Norfolk RB
Essex	Essex RB
Kent	Kent RB
Sussex	East Sussex RB, West Sussex RB
Hampshire	Hampshire RB
Isle of Wight	Isle of Wight RB
Avon and Dorset	Avon and Dorset RB
Devon	Devon RB
Cornwall	Cornwall RB
Somerset	Somerset RB
Bristol Avon	Bristol Avon RB
Severn	Severn RB
Wye	Wye RB
Usk	Usk RB
Glamorgan	Glamorgan RB
South West Wales	South West Wales RB
Gwynedd	Gwynedd RB
Dee and Clwyd	Dee and Clwyd RB
Mersey and Weaver	Mersey RB, Cheshire RB
Lancashire	Lancashire RB
Cumberland	Cumberland RB

== Bibliography ==
- Legislation (1963). Water Resources Act 1963 (PDF). HMSO.
- Porter, Elizabeth (1978). Water Management in England and Wales. Cambridge University Press. ISBN 978-0-521-21865-8.
- Wisdom, A S (1966). Land Drainage. London: Sweet & Maxwell.
