= Manœuvres Act 1958 =

Act of the Parliament of the United Kingdom

Manœuvres Act 1958 (Note: Section 10(1).)
- Act of Parliament
- Parliament of the United Kingdom
- Long title: An Act to consolidate certain enactments relating to defence manoeuvres.
- Citation: 7 & 8 Eliz. 2. c. 7
- Territorial extent: Great Britain (Note: Section 10(3).)

Dates
- Royal assent: 18 December 1958
- Commencement: 18 December 1958 (Note: The Acts of Parliament (Commencement) Act 1793.)

Other legislation
- Amends: See § Repealed enactments
- Repeals/revokes: See § Repealed enactments
- Amended by: Criminal Damage Act 1971; Statute Law (Repeals) Act 1974; Criminal Procedure (Scotland) Act 1975; Criminal Law Act 1977; Criminal Justice Act 1982; Roads (Scotland) Act 1984; Water Act 1989; Environment Act 1995 (Consequential Amendments) Regulations 1996; Access to Justice Act 1999; Courts Act 2003

Status: Amended

Text of statute as originally enacted

Revised text of statute as amended

Text of the Manœuvres Act 1958 as in force today (including any amendments) within the United Kingdom, from legislation.gov.uk.

The Manœuvres Act 1958 (7 & 8 Eliz. 2. c. 7) is an act of the Parliament of the United Kingdom that consolidated enactments relating to defence manœuvres in Great Britain.

== Provisions ==
=== Repealed enactments ===
Section 10(2) of the act repealed 3 enactments, listed in that section.

Citation	Short title	Extent of repeal
60 & 61 Vict. c. 43	Military Manoeuvres Act 1897	The whole act.
1 & 2 Geo. 5. c. 44	Military Manoeuvres Act 1911	The whole act.
6 & 7 Eliz. 2. c. 30	Land Powers (Defence) Act 1958	Sections two to five, in subsection (2) of section twenty-seven the words "two to" and the words "except subsection (5) of the said section two", and the First Schedule.
