= Local Government (Scotland) Act 1889 =

Act of the Parliament of the United Kingdom

Local Government (Scotland) Act 1889 (Note: Section 1.)
- Act of Parliament
- Parliament of the United Kingdom
- Long title: An Act to amend the Laws relating to Local Government in Scotland.
- Citation: 52 & 53 Vict. c. 50
- Territorial extent: Scotland (Note: Section 2.)

Dates
- Royal assent: 26 August 1889
- Commencement: 26 August 1889 (Note: The Acts of Parliament (Commencement) Act 1793.)
- Repealed: 27 May 1976
Other legislation
Repeals/revokes	Edinburgh Bridges and Highways Act 1713
Amended by	Public Health (Scotland) Act 1897; Representation of the People Act 1918; Education (Scotland) Act 1946; Local Government (Scotland) Act 1947; Gas Act 1948; Rivers (Prevention of Pollution) (Scotland) Act 1951; Police (Scotland) Act 1956; Mental Health (Scotland) Act 1960
Repealed by	Statute Law (Repeals) Act 1976
Relates to	Local Government Act 1888

Status: Repealed

Text of statute as originally enacted

The Local Government (Scotland) Act 1889 (52 & 53 Vict. c. 50) was an act of the Parliament of the United Kingdom which was passed on 26 August 1889. The main effect of the act was to establish elected county councils in Scotland. In this it followed the pattern introduced in England and Wales by the Local Government Act 1888 (51 & 52 Vict. c. 41).

== County councils ==
The act provided that a county council should be established in each county, consisting of elected councillors. The term "county" was defined as excluding any royal burgh or parliamentary burgh, but with provisions that the county council would have powers over such burghs which met certain criteria, principally being those burghs which had fewer than 7,000 people at the time of the 1881 census. The burghs which remained independent of county council control were not listed in the act, but it was subsequently determined that there were 26 such burghs:

- Aberdeen
- Airdrie
- Arbroath
- Ayr
- Brechin
- Dumbarton
- Dumfries
- Dundee
- Dunfermline
- Edinburgh
- Elgin
- Forfar
- Galashiels
- Glasgow
- Greenock
- Hamilton
- Hawick
- Inverness
- Kilmarnock
- Kirkcaldy
- Leith
- Montrose
- Paisley
- Perth
- Port Glasgow
- Stirling

There were some disputes arising as to whether the county councils had any powers to levy charges on these burghs; Selkirkshire County Council tried to argue that it could claim certain costs from Galashiels, but the Scottish Supreme Court found that Galashiels was entirely responsible for its own affairs and could not be taxed by Selkirkshire County Council. When the burghs of Motherwell and Wishaw merged in 1920 to become the burgh of Motherwell and Wishaw the new burgh was removed from the control of Lanarkshire County Council.

Each county (excluding all burghs) was divided into electoral divisions, made up of groupings of parishes, each returning one councillor. Councillors for burghs that were under the county council's authority were co-opted by the members of the burgh's town council.

The chairman of each county council, elected by the members, was given the title "Convener of the County".

== Powers transferred to the county councils ==
The county councils received numerous powers and duties previously performed by a number of bodies:

- Commissioners of Supply for the county
- County road trustees
- Justices of the peace of the county in general or special or quarter sessions

Among the diverse functions acquired from the justices were inspection of gas meters, regulation of explosive materials, weights and measures, habitual drunkards, control of wild birds and providing visitors to asylums.

In addition the county council exercised authority under the Public Health Acts for the entire county outside burghs. They also had jurisdiction under legislation dealing with contagious animal diseases and destructive insects.

County councils also took over police functions from burghs with less than 7,000 population.

Section 15 of the act allowed the Secretary for Scotland to transfer further powers to the councils.

== Areas and boundaries ==
The act did not define or list the counties. The counties were initially to have the same boundaries as those already existing, with some stated exceptions:

- The county of Lanark was to be united. Previously, for some administrative purposes it comprised three counties, known as the counties of the lower, middle and upper ward of Lanark.
- The counties of Ross and Cromarty were to be united "for all purposes whatsoever" as the county of Ross and Cromarty.
- The boundaries of the counties of Dumbarton and Stirling were to be adjusted, so that the entire parishes of Cumbernauld and Kirkintilloch were to be in Dunbartonshire. This area remained an exclave of Dunbartonshire until the county council's abolition in 1975. Stirling gained the lands north of Endrick Water as far as the centre-line of Loch Lomond.
- Part of the county of Banff was transferred to the county of Aberdeenshire; and part of the county of Elgin was transferred to Banff. These areas had already been administered by the counties in question under highways legislation.
- The county of Orkney and lordship of Zetland were separated to form two counties with those names.

=== Boundary changes ===
It was recognised in the act that the boundaries of the counties would need to be altered. Accordingly, section 45 established a body styled the "Boundary Commissioners for Scotland" to form county electoral divisions, and to simplify the boundaries of counties, burghs and parishes, so that:

1. each burgh and county would be, if expedient, within a single county,
2. no part of a county would be detached therefrom, and
3. no part of a parish would be detached therefrom,

and to arbitrate disputes between local authorities arising from boundary changes. All boundary changes made by the commissioners came into full effect on 15 May 1892. For most purposes, however, the bulk of the changes became effective a year earlier, on 15 May 1891.

Subsequent to the commissioners' dissolution, the Secretary for Scotland had the power to vary boundaries on the application of a council.

=== Districts and district committees ===
Each county (unless it contained fewer than six parishes) was to be divided into districts consisting of groups of electoral divisions. Each district was to have a district committee consisting of the area's county councillors, one representative from each parochial board in the district, and one from each burgh. The committees performed the county council's functions in respect of the Public Health Acts and highways legislation.

== Reform ==
The county councils established under the act were substantially reformed in 1930 under the Local Government (Scotland) Act 1929 (19 & 20 Geo. 5. c. 25), which significantly increased the functions of county councils and brought all burghs under the jurisdiction of the county councils, leaving separate only the four burghs which were classed as counties of cities, being Aberdeen, Dundee, Edinburgh, and Glasgow.

== Subsequent developments ==
The whole act was repealed by section 1(1) of, and part VIII of schedule 1 to, the Statute Law (Repeals) Act 1976, which came into force on 27 May 1976.
