= Land Drainage Act 1976 =

Act of the Parliament of the United Kingdom

Land Drainage Act 1976 (Note: Section 118(1).)
- Act of Parliament
- Parliament of the United Kingdom
- Long title: An Act to consolidate certain enactments relating to land drainage.
- Citation: 1976 c. 70
- Territorial extent: England and Wales (Note: Section 118(3).)

Dates
- Royal assent: 15 November 1976
- Commencement: 15 November 1976 (Note: Section 118(2).)
Other legislation
Amends	Public Works Loans Act 1965; See § Repealed enactments
Repeals/revokes	Land Drainage Act 1930; Drainage Rates Act 1958; Land Drainage Act 1961; Drainage Rates Act 1962; Drainage Rates Act 1963; Land Drainage (Amendment) Act 1976
Amended by	Highways Act 1980; Acquisition of Land Act 1981; Airports Act 1986; Local Government Act 1985 (Land Drainage Functions) Order 1986; Water Act 1989; Internal Drainage Boards (Finance) (Amendment) Regulations 1991; Water Consolidation (Consequential Provisions) Act 1991; Ministry of Agriculture, Fisheries and Food (Dissolution) Order 2002

Status: Partially repealed

Text of statute as originally enacted

Revised text of statute as amended

Text of the Land Drainage Act 1976 as in force today (including any amendments) within the United Kingdom, from legislation.gov.uk.

The Land Drainage Act 1976 (c. 70) is an act of the Parliament of the United Kingdom that consolidated enactments relating to land drainage in England and Wales.

== Provisions ==
=== Repealed enactments ===
Section 117(3) of the act repealed 25 enactments, listed in schedule 8 to the act.

Enactments repealed by section 117(3)
Citation	Short title	Extent of repeal
20 & 21 Geo. 5. c. 44	Land Drainage Act 1930	The whole act.
1 Edw. 8 & 1 Geo. 6. c. 70	Agriculture Act 1937	Section 15.
3 & 4 Geo. 6. c. 50	Agriculture (Miscellaneous War Provisions) (No. 2) Act 1940	Section 3.
9 & 10 Geo. 6. c. 26	Emergency Laws (Transitional Provisions) Act 1946	In Schedule 2, the entry numbered 2 under the heading beginning "Amendments of enactments relating to land drainage".
6 & 7 Eliz. 2. c. 37	Drainage Rates Act 1958	The whole act.
9 & 10 Eliz. 2. c. 48	Land Drainage Act 1961	The whole act.
10 & 11 Eliz. 2. c. 39	Drainage Rates Act 1962	The whole act.
1963 c. 10	Drainage Rates Act 1963	The whole act.
1963 c. 25	Finance Act 1963	In Schedule 12, paragraphs 21, 23 and 24(7) and (8).
1963 c. 33	London Government Act 1963	Schedule 14, except paragraph 10.
1968 c. 34	Agriculture (Miscellaneous Provisions) Act 1968	Part IV and Schedule 6.
1968 c. xxxix	Greater London Council (General Powers) Act 1968	In section 7(4), paragraphs (c) and (d).
1969 c. 48	Post Office Act 1969	In Schedule 4, paragraph 32.
1970 c. 40	Agriculture Act 1970	Part V.
1971 c. 23	Courts Act 1971	In Schedule 9, in Part I the entry relating to the Land Drainage Act 1930.
1971 c. 75	Civil Aviation Act 1971	In Schedule 5, paragraph 1.
1972 c. 60	Gas Act 1972	In Schedule 6, paragraph 1.
1972 c. 70	Local Government Act 1972	In Schedule 29, paragraphs 24 and 25.
1972 c. xv	Thames Barrier and Flood Prevention Act 1972	Section 69(3).
1973 c. 37	Water Act 1973	Section 19.
1973 c. 37	Water Act 1973	In Schedule 2, in paragraph 6 the definition of "main river map", paragraphs 8 to 11 and paragraph 13(2) and (3)(b).
1973 c. 37	Water Act 1973	In Schedule 3, in paragraph 11(1)(a) the words from "and the chairmen" to "committees", and in paragraph 11(1)(b) the words "or any such committee".
1973 c. 37	Water Act 1973	Schedule 5.
1973 c. 37	Water Act 1973	In Schedule 7, in paragraph 12(2) the words from "and to internal" onwards.
1973 c. 37	Water Act 1973	In Schedule 8, paragraphs 20, 21, 24 to 31 and 72 to 75.
1974 c. 7	Local Government Act 1974	In Schedule 7, paragraph 13.
1975 c. 76	Local Land Charges Act 1975	In Schedule 1, the entry relating to the Land Drainage Act 1961.
1975 c. 78	Airports Authority Act 1975	Section 25(4).
1976 c. 15	Rating (Caravan Sites) Act 1976	Section 1(8).
1976 c. 17	Land Drainage (Amendment) Act 1976	The whole act.
