= Rivers (Prevention of Pollution) (Scotland) Act 1951 =

Act of the Parliament of the United Kingdom

Rivers (Prevention of Pollution) (Scotland) Act 1951 (Note: Section 36(1).)
- Act of Parliament
- Parliament of the United Kingdom
- Long title: An Act to provide for establishing river purification boards in Scotland and for conferring on or transferring to such boards functions relating to the prevention of river pollution; to make new provision for maintaining or restoring the cleanliness of the rivers and other inland waters and the tidal waters of Scotland in place of the Rivers Pollution Prevention Act 1876, and certain other enactments; and for purposes connected with the matters aforesaid.
- Citation: 14 & 15 Geo. 6. c. 66
- Territorial extent: Scotland (Note: Section 36(5).)

Dates
- Royal assent: 1 August 1951
- Commencement: 1 August 1951 (Parts I, II and IV, except section 34) (Note: The Acts of Parliament (Commencement) Act 1793.); Various (Part III, section 34 and section 36(3)) (Note: Section 36(4).)
- Repealed: 1 April 2006 (Note: The Water Environment (Consequential and Savings Provisions) (Scotland) Order 2006 (SSI 2006/181).)
Other legislation
Repeals/revokes	See § Repealed enactments
Amended by	Statute Law (Repeals) Act 1974
Repealed by	Control of Pollution Act 1974; Environment Act 1995; Water Environment (Consequential and Savings Provisions) (Scotland) Order 2006
Relates to	Rivers (Prevention of Pollution) Act 1951

Status: Repealed

Text of statute as originally enacted

Revised text of statute as amended

The Rivers (Prevention of Pollution) (Scotland) Act 1951 (14 & 15 Geo. 6. c. 66) was an act of the Parliament of the United Kingdom that provided for the establishment of river purification boards in Scotland and made new provision for maintaining or restoring the cleanliness of rivers and other inland waters there, in place of the Rivers Pollution Prevention Act 1876 (39 & 40 Vict. c. 75) and certain other enactments.

The Rivers (Prevention of Pollution) Act 1951 (14 & 15 Geo. 6. c. 64) made similar provisions for England and Wales.

== Provisions ==
=== Repealed enactments ===
Section 36(3) of the act repealed 7 enactments, listed in the fourth schedule to the act.

Enactments repealed by section 36(3)
Citation	Short title	Extent of repeal
20 & 21 Vict. c. clxviii	Tweed Fisheries Act 1857	Sections sixty-five and sixty-six, except in relation to tidal waters to which this Act does not apply.
25 & 26 Vict. c. 97	Salmon Fisheries (Scotland) Act 1862	Section thirteen, except in relation to tidal waters to which this Act does not apply.
39 & 40 Vict. c. 75	Rivers Pollution Prevention Act 1876	The whole act except sections one and seven and so much of section twenty-one as relates to section seven.
52 & 53 Vict. c. 50	Local Government (Scotland) Act 1889	Section fifty-five.
55 & 56 Vict. c. 55	Burgh Police (Scotland) Act 1892	In section two hundred and twenty-two, the words from "it shall not be lawful" to "any source" and the words from "and every person who" to the end of the section.
55 & 56 Vict. c. 55	Burgh Police (Scotland) Act 1892	In section two hundred and thirty-three, the words "river or inland lock or public reservoir or dock".
56 & 57 Vict. c. 31	Rivers Pollution Prevention Act 1893	The whole act.
60 & 61 Vict. c. 38	Public Health (Scotland) Act 1897	In section one hundred and sixteen the words "river stream ditch" and the words "or other channel".

== Subsequent developments ==
Section 36(3) of, and schedule 4 to, the act were repealed by section 1 of, and part XI of the schedule to, the Statute Law (Repeals) Act 1974, which came into force on 27 June 1974.

The whole act was repealed by article 2 of, and part I of the schedule to, the Water Environment (Consequential and Savings Provisions) (Scotland) Order 2006 (SSI 2006/181), which came into force on 1 April 2006.
