= River Boards Act 1948 =

Act of the Parliament of the United Kingdom

River Boards Act 1948 (Note: Section 38(1).)
- Act of Parliament
- Parliament of the United Kingdom
- Long title: An Act to provide for establishing river boards and for conferring on or transferring to such boards functions relating to land drainage, fisheries and river pollution and certain other functions; and for purposes connected with the matters aforesaid.
- Citation: 11 & 12 Geo. 6. c. 32
- Territorial extent: England and Wales (Note: Section 38(2).)

Dates
- Royal assent: 28 May 1948
- Commencement: 28 May 1948 (Note: The Acts of Parliament (Commencement) Act 1793.)
- Repealed: 1 April 1963
Other legislation
Amends	Salmon and Freshwater Fisheries Act 1923
Amended by	Rivers (Prevention of Pollution) Act 1951; Charities Act 1960; Land Drainage Act 1961
Repealed by	Water Resources Act 1963
Relates to	Land Drainage Act 1930

Status: Repealed

Text of statute as originally enacted

The River Boards Act 1948 (11 & 12 Geo. 6. c. 32) was an act of the Parliament of the United Kingdom which provided constitutional, financial and general administrative structures for river boards, which were responsible for the management of river board areas, and superseded the catchment boards that had been set up under the Land Drainage Act 1930 (20 & 21 Geo. 5. c. 44).

== Background ==
In the 1920s there was a realisation that the current legislation concerning land drainage was somewhat chaotic, being largely based on the Statute of Sewers (23 Hen. 8. c. 5) passed by King Henry VIII in 1531, with some subsequent amendments. Accordingly, a royal commission was convened on 26 March 1927, with Lord Bledisloe acting as its chairman, which produced a final report towards the end of the year on 5 December. The report organised the rivers of England and Wales into 100 catchments, and suggested that a board should be appointed to oversee the work of smaller drainage authorities within each catchment. The resulting legislation was the Land Drainage Act 1930, but when it was passed, it only contained 47 of the catchment areas. Drainage authorities became internal drainage boards if they operated in an area which had a catchment board, and external drainage boards if there was no overall catchment board.

During the 1930s, there was a growing realisation that data on river flows and water quality was lacking, and in 1935 an Inland Water Survey Committee was created. They attempted to collect what data there was, and three annual reports were produced before the onset of the Second World War, but it was clear that gauging of rivers was in need of improvement, and its coverage was sporadic. Attempts to understand groundwater levels from data obtained from wells also showed the shortcomings of such an approach. In 1942, the Institution of Civil Engineers produced a report, discussing the development of a post-war water resources survey, and the Ministry of Health's Central Advisory Committee proposed a network of river boards, who would be responsible for systematic river gauging, as well as land drainage, fisheries and pollution. Again, the lack of comprehensive flow and water quality data was mentioned. In 1944, the government published a white paper, entitled "A National Water Policy", which stated that the collection of flow and water quality data, as well as the understanding of underground water resources should be resumed and pressed on with vigour as soon as circumstances permit. Such data was to be made available to all who needed it. Under the terms of the Water Act 1945, the Ministry of Housing and Local Government was given the responsibility for the conservation and appropriate use of water resources. Those wishing to construct wells were obliged to provide details of their drilling and testing operations to the Department of Scientific and Industrial Research, while anyone abstracting water had to keep proper records of the volume of water taken.

== Legislation ==
When the act was passed, it reduced 47 catchment areas to a smaller number of larger river board areas, covering most of England and Wales. The exceptions were the London area, which was managed by the Port of London Authority, and the jurisdiction of the River Thames Catchment Board and the Lee Conservancy Catchment Board, which continued to operate under their existing powers. The artificial distinction between internal and external drainage boards ceased, as all of them were now operating within a river board area. In addition to their land drainage responsibilities, the remit of the new boards included fisheries, the prevention of pollution, and gauging of rivers.

Although the act proposed river board areas, the precise details were not included in the legislation, and a consultative committee was convened to resolve issues with the boundaries for the areas. This involved liaising with catchment boards, fishery boards, county councils and county boroughs. By 19 May 1949, the borders of 17 areas had been settled, and a draft order to create the first river board, that for the River Severn, had been deposited before Parliament. Robin Turton, MP for Thirsk and Malton, asked the Minister of Agriculture whether the consultation period could be extended in some cases, as there were 60 drainage authorities operating in the Yorkshire Ouse River Board area, and getting a consensus was proving to be time-consuming.

Progress was not always smooth, as when the Wye and Usk River Board Area Order was submitted to Parliament in 1951, the House of Lords chose to annul the order. There had been considerable opposition to the joining together of the River Usk and its tributary the Ebbw River with the River Wye in one river board area when it was first proposed. Herefordshire County Council, Hereford City Council, the Wye Catchment Board and the Conservators of the Wye had all lodged objections with the House of Lords, on the basis that there was no obvious administrative centre for such an area, and that the management of the River Wye under the existing provisions had been exceptional.

The concern with collecting data outlined in the 1944 white paper was addressed in the act, requiring the river boards to plan and implement systematic flow gauging of the rivers within their areas. They were also required to collect data about water abstraction, as part of their general responsibility for the conservation of water resources, but an obvious shortcoming of this was that water supply companies could develop new sources without any reference to the river boards. Another area of responsibility was the enforcement of pollution laws. Until the passing of the act, this had been the remit of local sanitary authorities, who usually also owned the sewers that were the main sources of pollution. There was therefore little incentive to invest in better sewage treatment works. Such investment was encouraged by the passing of the Rivers (Prevention of Pollution) Acts of 1951 and 1961, during the currency of the 1948 Act, but a Working Party on Sewage Disposal suggested in 1970 that there were some 3,000 sewage treatment plants that were discharging inadequately-treated effluent into the rivers.

River boards were also given responsibility for fisheries. The importance of maintaining rivers for fish was first recognised with the passing of the Salmon Fishery Act 1861, which dealt with issues such as obstructions in the river, the use of fixed engines, illegal fishing, close seasons, the effects of pollution, and the establishment of a central authority, which at the time was the Home Office.

With the passing of the Salmon and Freshwater Fisheries Act 1907 (7 Edw. 7. c. 15), various provisions of the royal commission of 1900 were implemented, including the establishment of fishery boards to address issues of pollution and water abstraction. The 1861 act and 18 amendment acts that had been passed subsequently were consolidated in the Salmon and Freshwater Fisheries Act 1923. Some fishery boards amalgamated, and some ceased to operate due to lack of funding, but by 1948 there were still 45 operational boards. An issue with much of the legislation up to that point was that it identified concerns, but provided little in the way of practical arrangements that would allow them to be implemented. With the passing of the 1948 Act, fishery boards ceased to exist, and their functions were taken over by the river boards, in the first steps towards multifunctional management of catchments.

=== Boards ===
Eventually, 32 river boards were established under the terms of the act.

River board	Former catchment boards
Avon and Dorset	
Bristol Avon	Avon (Bristol)
Cheshire	Weaver
Cornwall	
Cumberland	Kent, Waver and Wampool
Dee and Clwyd	Clwyd, Dee
Devon	
East Suffolk and Norfolk	East Norfolk Rivers (including the river Waveney), East Suffolk Rivers, North Norfolk Rivers
East Sussex	Cuckmere, Old Haven (Pevensey) and Bulverhythe Stream, Ouse (Sussex)
Essex	Essex Rivers, Roding, Stour (Essex and Suffolk)
Glamorgan	Mid-Glamorgan
Great Ouse	Ouse (Great)
Gwynedd	Anglesey Rivers, Conway, Dysynni, Prysor
Hampshire	Avon and Stour
Hull and East Yorkshire	Hull
Isle of Wight	
Kent	Kent Rivers, Rother and Jury's Gut,
Lancashire	Crossens, Douglas, Lune, Wyre
Lincolnshire	Ancholme and Winterton Beck, Witham and Steeping River
Mersey	Alt, Mersey and Irwell
Nene	Nene
Northumberland and Tyneside	
Severn	Severn
Somerset	Somerset Rivers
South West Wales	
Trent	Trent
Usk	
Wear and Tees	
Welland	Welland
West Sussex	Adur, Arun
Wye	Wye
Yorkshire Ouse	Derwent, Ouse (Yorkshire)

The whole act was repealed on 1 April 1965, by section 136 of, and part I of schedule 14 to, the Water Resources Act 1963, and the powers of the river boards were transferred to twenty-seven river authorities on the same day.

== Bibliography ==
- Ayton, Warwick (June 1998). Salmon Fisheries in England and Wales (PDF). The Atlantic Salmon Trust. ISBN 978-1-870875-52-3.
- Dobson, Alban; Hull, Hubert (1931). The Land Drainage Act 1930. Oxford University Press.
- Lees, M L (October 1985). "Inland Water Surveying in the United Kingdom" (PDF). Institute of Hydrology. Archived (PDF) from the original on 6 August 2020.
- Porter, Elizabeth (1978). Water Management in England and Wales. Cambridge University Press. ISBN 978-0-521-21865-8.
- Wisdom, A S (1966). Land Drainage. London: Sweet & Maxwell.
