= Salmon Act 1986 =

Act of the Parliament of the United Kingdom

Salmon Act 1986 (Note: Section 43(1).)
- Act of Parliament
- Parliament of the United Kingdom
- Long title: An Act to make fresh provision for the administration of salmon fisheries in Scotland; to provide as to the licensing and regulation of salmon dealing in Scotland and in England and Wales; to provide for, and as respects, certain offences in the law of Scotland and in the law of England and Wales in connection with salmon; to amend the Salmon and Freshwater Fisheries Act 1975, section 5 of the Sea Fisheries Regulation Act 1966 and section 9 of the Diseases of Fish Act 1983; to provide for the review of salmon fishing by means of nets; and for connected purposes.
- Citation: 1986 c. 62
- Territorial extent: England and Wales; Scotland; (Note: Section 43(4)–(5).)

Dates
- Royal assent: 7 November 1986
- Commencement: 7 January 1987 (except section 27); 1 January 1993 (section 27) (Note: Section 43(2). The Salmon Act 1986 (Commencement and Transitional Provisions) Order 1992.)
Other legislation
Amends	Salmon and Freshwater Fisheries Act 1975
Repeals/revokes	Salmon Act 1696; Salmon Fisheries (Scotland) Act 1862; Salmon Acts Amendment Act 1863; Salmon Fisheries (Scotland) Act 1863; Salmon Fisheries (Scotland) Act 1864; Salmon Acts Amendment Act 1870; Fishery Board (Scotland) Act 1882
Amended by	Water Consolidation (Consequential Provisions) Act 1991; Salmon and Freshwater Fisheries (Consolidation) (Scotland) Act 2003; Scotland Act 1998 (River Tweed) Order 2006

Status: Amended

Text of statute as originally enacted

Revised text of statute as amended

Text of the Salmon Act 1986 as in force today (including any amendments) within the United Kingdom, from legislation.gov.uk.

The Salmon Act 1986 (c. 62) is an act of the Parliament of the United Kingdom which outlines legislation that covers legal and illegal matter within the salmon farming and fishing industries. Among the provisions in the act, it makes it illegal to "handle salmon in suspicious circumstances", which is defined in law as when one believes, or could reasonably believe, that salmon has been illegally fished or that salmon—that has come from an illegal source—has been received, retained, removed, or disposed of.

== Provisions ==
The act contains 70 paragraphs, dealing with a wide range of detailed matters relating to salmon fisheries. Matters covered include

1. the definition and registration of "salmon fishery", the legal regulation of close seasons on such fisheries, and the constitution and governance of salmon fishery boards.
2. regulation of the methods allowed for salmon fishing (specifically, giving the Secretary of State the power to define what is meant by various forms of net fishing)
3. regulation of the trade-in salmon dealers.

A large part of the act updates Victorian-era legislation, for instance, the Salmon Fisheries (Scotland) Act 1868.

== Handling salmon/fish in suspicious circumstances ==
As originally enacted, section 32 of the act was headed "Handling salmon in suspicious circumstances". This section creates an offence in England and Wales for any person who receives or disposes of any salmon in circumstances where they believe, or could reasonably believe, that the salmon has been illegally fished. Section 22 introduces a parallel provision into Scottish law. As amended by section 229 of the Marine and Coastal Access Act 2009, section 32 is now headed "Handling fish in suspicious circumstances" and thus also applies to trout, eels, lampreys, smelt, and freshwater fish, as well as any additional fish that may be specified by orders issued under section 40A of the Salmon and Freshwater Fisheries Act 1975.

The offence (whether as originally enacted, or as amended, or both) is regularly cited, often without context, in lists of British laws that are deemed to be strange or archaic.
