= Salmon and Freshwater Fisheries Act 1923 =

Act of the Parliament of the United Kingdom

Salmon and Freshwater Fisheries Act 1923 (Note: Section 94(1).)
- Act of Parliament
- Parliament of the United Kingdom
- Long title: An Act to consolidate and amend the enactments relating to Salmon and Freshwater Fisheries in England and Wales.
- Citation: 13 & 14 Geo. 5. c. 16
- Territorial extent: England and Wales (Note: Section 94(3).)

Dates
- Royal assent: 18 July 1923
- Commencement: 1 January 1924 (Note: Section 94(1).)
- Repealed: 1 August 1975
Other legislation
Amends	See § Repealed enactments
Repeals/revokes	See § Repealed enactments
Amended by	Salmon and Freshwater Fisheries (Amendment) Act 1929; Local Government Act 1933; Salmon and Freshwater Fisheries Act 1935; River Boards Act 1948; Justices of the Peace Act 1949; Rivers (Prevention of Pollution) Act 1951; Charities Act 1960; Crown Estate Act 1961; Water Resources Act 1963; Salmon and Freshwater Fisheries Act 1923 (Amendment) Act 1964; Salmon and Freshwater Fisheries Act 1965; Salmon and Freshwater Fisheries Act 1972
Repealed by	Salmon and Freshwater Fisheries Act 1975

Status: Repealed

Text of statute as originally enacted

The Salmon and Freshwater Fisheries Act 1923 (13 & 14 Geo. 5. c. 16) was an act of the Parliament of the United Kingdom passed by the United Kingdom Government which attempted to consolidate fishery legislation, which at the time consisted of the Salmon Fishery Act 1861 (24 & 25 Vict. c. 109) and 18 amending acts which had been passed subsequently.

== Background ==
The United Kingdom has a long history of legislation designed to regulate rivers and their associated fisheries, and four issues have been consistently addressed in these laws. The issues are obstructions preventing the movement of fish along rivers, close times and seasons to ensure populations of fish continue to flourish, irregular netting, and the administrative structures necessary to implement any legislation. The first known edict was part of Magna Carta in 1215, which included a clause concerning the removal of weirs from the River Thames and River Medway, to benefit both navigation and fisheries. In 1278, Edward I legislated that there should be a gap in weirs on the rivers Eden, Esk and Derwent, through which "a sow and her five little pigs can enter", and Edward IV made explicit provision for fisheries in 1432. Edward I's Statute of Westminster dating from 1285 enshrined the need for a close season during which salmon could not be removed from rivers, while Elizabeth I introduced a minimum size for caught salmon, which was set at 16 inches (41 cm). Edward III was the monarch who first introduced the concept of 'authorised' nets.

The Statute of Westminster made provision for overseers to regulate fisheries, and Edward III allowed justices of the peace to employ under-conservators to police the rivers, but in reality there was little administrative support for ensuring the regulations were met until the passing of the Salmon Fishery Act 1865. Although formal recording of fish stocks prior to the 19th century was extremely patchy, there was a general perception that at the onset of the Industrial Revolution fish stocks were depleting, as a result of obstructions built across rivers, and over-zealous netting of fish is some rivers and estuaries. This led to the convening of a parliamentary select committee in 1825, to consider the salmon fisheries of the United Kingdom. Its remit was to report on the state of the fisheries, and the legislation that affected them.

They produced two reports, the first of which contained 13 recommendations. These included a national close season, and weekly close times; making the taking or selling of salmon or trout during the close season an offence; a requirement that mill owners should erect and maintain gratings where water was taken from a river; guarding against the release of toxic substances into watercourses; a prohibition on the use of lights to catch salmon; and the regulation of the size of mesh that could be used in nets. They further recommended that salmon fisheries should be able to appoint and pay water bailiffs, with rights of access; that the conviction of offenders should be relatively easy; and that all of their recommendations should be enshrined in a law covering England and Wales, Scotland, and Ireland. The second report dealt with obstructions, which was more sensitive, given that most of the structures were servicing the manufacturing industry, which wielded a lot of power.

No action was taken to address any of the issues raised by the select committee, and it was another 35 years before further progress was made. A royal commission was set up in 1860, with a remit ...to enquire into the Salmon Fisheries of England and Wales, with the view of increasing the supply of a valuable article of food for the benefit of the public... It found that the reasons for the decline of the fisheries were similar to those listed in 1825, notably, obstructions which prevented fish moving up and down the rivers, the use of fixed engines, pollution, illegal fishing, the defective regulation of close seasons, the lack of a management system for the rivers and fisheries, and a general confusion about what the law allowed. It made specific mention of the pollution of rivers cause by water emanating from mines, industrial effluent, and sewage. It also highlighted the need for a body to arbitrate between the antagonistic needs of industry and fisheries, but did not suggest what that should look like. This time, some action was taken, and the Salmon Fishery Act 1861 (24 & 25 Vict. c. 109) addressed most of the issues, with the Home Office given responsibility for fisheries. Thirty-three previous acts of Parliament were repealed, in order to remove uncertainty and confusion about what the legal position was, but no provision was made to create or fund local management of the fisheries.

The major recommendations of the royal commission were gradually implemented by a series of supplementary acts. The first was the Salmon Fishery Act 1865 (28 & 29 Vict. c. 121), which allowed boards of conservators to be set up, with powers to manage rivers or river systems as defined by the Secretary of State. The boards could also represent fishery interests, and the first steps towards funding were provided by the introduction of fishing licences. The Salmon Fishery Act 1873 (36 & 37 Vict. c. 71) gave additional powers to fishery boards and altered the way they were constituted. The Freshwater Fisheries Act 1878 (41 & 42 Vict. c. 39) extended the concept of Fishery Boards to coarse fisheries, where rivers contained trout or char, but not salmon. Similarly, licences were required to catch these two types of fish, but not for other freshwater fish, and a close season for freshwater fish was introduced, lasting from 15 March to 15 June. The Freshwater Fisheries Act 1884 (47 & 48 Vict. c. 11) further extended the reach of fishery boards, to cover rivers that only contained freshwater fish, but no game fish, and allowed them to pass byelaws covering the size of freshwater fish that could be taken, and the methods by which they could be caught. Licence fees for freshwater fishing were introduced by the Salmon and Freshwater Fisheries Act 1907 (7 Edw. 7. c. 15).

== Provisions ==
By 1923, the situation was similar to that which had been addressed by the 1861 act, in that fishery legislation was covered by that act and 18 more which had been passed subsequently. The act therefore sought to remove confusion by consolidating all of the fishery legislation into a single act. It again altered the constitution of fishery boards, allowing representatives from county councils and rod licence-holders to be appointed as members, in addition to those who were already represented on the boards. It also harmonised the law in respect of game fish such as salmon and trout, and other freshwater fish. When the bill was presented to Parliament, Sir Robert Sanders, the Minister for Agriculture, described the changes that it would bring in very colourful language.

One more difference this Bill makes in the law. It is a step in the direction of democracy among fish. Formerly, law gave precedence to the aristocratic fish like the salmon and the trout. Now, also it takes care of the bourgeois carp or the plebian roach or any other humble citizen of the river, even a member of the criminal classes like the pike, and it does not insult them by calling them 'coarse fish', a name by which they are often known; it speaks of them here as 'freshwater fish', and for the first time their rights are recognised. They get some of the protection that was formerly lavished only on their smart and fashionable compatriots.

=== Repealed enactments ===
Section 93(1) of the act repealed 19 enactments, listed in the fifth schedule to the act, as far as they related to England and Wales.

Citation	Short title	Extent of repeal
24 & 25 Vict. c. 109	Salmon Fishery Act 1861	The whole act.
26 & 27 Vict. c. 10	Salmon Acts Amendment Act 1863	The whole act.
28 & 29 Vict. c. 121	Salmon Fishery Act 1865	The whole act.
33 & 34 Vict. c. 33	Salmon Acts Amendment Act 1870	The whole act.
36 & 37 Vict. c. 71	Salmon Fishery Act 1873	The whole act.
39 & 40 Vict. c. 19	Salmon Fishery Act 1876	The whole act.
39 & 40 Vict. c. 34	Elver Fishing Act 1876	The whole act.
40 & 41 Vict. c. 65	Fisheries (Dynamite) Act 1877	The whole act.
40 & 41 Vict. c. xcviii	Norfolk and Suffolk Fisheries Act 1877	The whole act.
41 & 42 Vict. c. 39	Freshwater Fisheries Act 1878	The whole act.
42 & 43 Vict. c. 26	Salmon Fishery Law Amendment Act 1879	The whole act.
47 & 48 Vict. c. 11	Freshwater Fisheries Act 1884	The whole act.
49 & 50 Vict. c. 2	Freshwater Fisheries Act 1886	The whole act.
49 & 50 Vict. c. 39	Salmon and Freshwater Fisheries Act 1886	The whole act.
54 & 55 Vict. c. 37	Fisheries Act 1891	Section twelve.
55 & 56 Vict. c. 50	Salmon and Freshwater Fisheries Act 1892	The whole act.
59 & 60 Vict. c. 18	Fisheries (Norfolk and Suffolk) Act 1896	The whole act.
7 Edw. 7. c. 15	Salmon and Freshwater Fisheries Act 1907	The whole act.
11 & 12 Geo. 5. c. 38	Salmon and Freshwater Fisheries Act 1921	The whole act.

== Subsequent developments ==
The whole act was repealed by section 42(1) of, and the fifth schedule to, the Salmon and Freshwater Fisheries Act 1975, which came into force on 1 August 1975.

== Bibliography ==
- Ayton, Warwick (June 1998). Salmon Fisheries in England and Wales (PDF). The Atlantic Salmon Trust. ISBN 978-1-870875-52-3.
- Howarth, William (1987). Freshwater Fishery Law. Financial Training Publications. ISBN 978-1-85185-030-3.
