= Land Drainage Act 1930 =

Act of the Parliament of the United Kingdom

Land Drainage Act 1930 (Note: Section 84(2).)
- Act of Parliament
- Parliament of the United Kingdom
- Long title: An Act to amend and consolidate the enactments relating to the drainage of land, and for purposes in connection with such amendment.
- Citation: 20 & 21 Geo. 5. c. 44
- Territorial extent: England and Wales (Note: Section 84(1).)

Dates
- Royal assent: 1 August 1930
- Commencement: 1 August 1930 (Note: The Acts of Parliament (Commencement) Act 1793.)
- Repealed: 17 January 1977
Other legislation
Amends	Ipswich and Stowmarket Navigation Act 1790; Ipswich and Stowmarket Navigation Act 1793; See § Repealed enactments
Repeals/revokes	See § Repealed enactments
Amended by	Thames Conservancy Act 1932; Local Government Act 1933; Local Government Act 1948; Rivers (Prevention of Pollution) Act 1951; Drainage Rates Act 1958; Charities Act 1960; Land Compensation Act 1961; Land Drainage Act 1961; Crown Estate Act 1961; London Government Act 1963; National Loans Act 1968; Courts Act 1971
Repealed by	Land Drainage Act 1976
Relates to	Thames Conservancy (Appointments and Tolls) Provisional Order Act 1910; Land Drainage (Scotland) Act 1930; River Boards Act 1948

Status: Repealed

Text of statute as originally enacted

The Land Drainage Act 1930 (20 & 21 Geo. 5. c. 44) was an act of the Parliament of the United Kingdom that provided a new set of administrative structures to ensure that drainage of low-lying land could be managed effectively. It followed the proposals of a royal commission which sat during 1927.

The act sought to set up catchment boards with overall responsibility for each of the main rivers of England and Wales, and to alter the basis on which drainage rates could be collected, removing the 400-year-old precept that only those who directly benefited from drainage works could be expected to pay for them.

== Background ==
Before the 1930s, land drainage in the United Kingdom was regulated by the Statute of Sewers (23 Hen. 8. c. 5), passed by King Henry VIII in 1531, and several further acts which built upon that foundation. However, there was some dissatisfaction with these powers, as although there were administrative bodies with powers to manage the drainage of low-lying areas, they did not have sufficient resources to do this effectively. Existing drainage boards and those who lived and worked in the areas they covered made complaints to the Ministry of Agriculture and Fisheries during the 1920s, and the government decided that a thorough review of the situation should be carried out.

Accordingly, a royal commission was set up, with Lord Bledisloe acting as its chairman. It was convened on 26 March 1927, and produced a final report later that year, on 5 December. The report described the existing laws as "vague and ill-defined, full of anomalies, obscure, lacking in uniformity, and even chaotic." It recommended that any replacement should have powers to carry out the work necessary for efficient drainage, together with the provision of financial resources to enable them to carry out their duties. At the time there were 361 drainage authorities covering England and Wales, and the proposed solution of having catchment boards responsible for each main river, with powers over the individual drainage boards, was essentially the same as had been proposed in 1877 by a select committee of the House of Lords. The report formed the basis for the subsequent bill.

== Provisions ==
The bill became an act of Parliament on 1 August 1930, and came into force immediately. Its full title was "An act to amend and consolidate the enactments relating to the drainage of land, and for purposes in connection with such amendment." Like many such acts, it repealed most of the legislation that had preceded it. In total, 16 acts dating from 1531 to 1929 were repealed, and three others were amended.

There were two fundamental ideas built into the legislation. One was that there should be an overall authority, responsible for the main rivers in each of the catchment areas, who would work closely with drainage authorities, who would be responsible for the internal drainage of smaller areas within a catchment. The other was that the funding for the drainage work should be levied over a much wider area than had previously been the case. Since the Statute of Sewers of 1531, it had only been possible to collect drainage rates from people whose land benefited directly from the drainage works, or whose land was saved from damage by them. The new Act swept this provision aside. The new catchment boards could now levy rates on the county councils and county borough councils throughout the entire catchment, not just on the low-lying parts of it, and could also levy rates on the internal drainage boards within their area. However, the 1930s were a time of economic uncertainty, and it was not always possible to levy rates at a level which would pay for drainage improvements. Thus the Somerset Catchment Board were able to improve regular maintenance of the main rivers in the Somerset Levels, but would have needed to raise between £5 and £6 per acre to fund improvements. In a time of agricultural depression and falling prices, such rates were unrealistic. Internal drainage boards raised their funding by a levy on the landowners and occupiers of those who lived within their district.

As originally conceived, local drainage boards were defined as internal drainage boards if they were situated in an area covered by a catchment board, and external drainage boards if there was no overall catchment board for their area. The distinction only lasted until the passing of the River Boards Act 1948, which transferred the land drainage, fisheries and river pollution functions of the catchment boards to river boards. Thirty-two river board areas were defined covering the whole of England and Wales, and a river board was constituted for each one. Consequently, all external drainage boards were within a river board area, and they became internal drainage boards. The 1948 act was repealed by the Water Resources Act 1963, and the river boards were replaced by twenty-seven river authorities on 1 April 1965.

=== Repealed enactments ===
Section 83(1) of the act repealed 18 enactments, listed in the seventh schedule to the act.

Enactments repealed by section 83(1)
Citation	Short title	Description	Extent of repeal
23 Hen. 8. c. 5	Statute of Sewers	A generall Acte concernynge Commissions of Sewers to be directed in all parts within the Realme.	The whole act.
25 Hen. 8. c. 10	Oath of Commissioners of Sewers Act 1533	An Acte concernynge the acceptaunce of the othe to the Acte of Sewers.	The whole act.
3 & 4 Edw. 6. c. 8	Continuance of Statute of Sewers Act 1549	An Acte for the contynuance of the Statute of Sewers.	The whole act.
1 Mar. Sess. 3. c. 11	Glamorganshire Sea Sands Act 1554	An Acte touching the Sea Sandes in Glamorganshire.	The whole act.
13 Eliz. c. 9	Commission of Sewers Act 1571	An Acte for the Commission of Sewers.	The whole act.
3 Jac. 1. c. 14	Thames Commission of Sewers Act 1605	An Acte for the explanation of the Statute of Sewers.	The whole act.
7 Ann. c. 33	Commissions of Sewers Act 1708	The Commissions of Sewers Act, 1708.	The whole act.
3 & 4 Will. 4. c. 22	Sewers Act 1833	The Sewers Act, 1833.	The whole act.
10 & 11 Vict. c. 38	Land Drainage Act 1847	The Land Drainage Act, 1847.	The whole act.
12 & 13 Vict. c. 50	Sewers Act 1849	The Sewers Act, 1849.	The whole act.
24 & 25 Vict. c. 133	Land Drainage Act 1861	The Land Drainage Act, 1861.	The whole act.
8 Edw. 7. c. 68	Port of London Act 1908	The Port of London Act, 1908.	Subsection (1) of section eight and the Third Schedule.
5 & 6 Geo. 5. c. 4	Land Drainage Act 1914	The Land Drainage Act, 1914.	The whole act.
8 & 9 Geo. 5. c. 17	Land Drainage Act 1918	The Land Drainage Act, 1918.	The whole act.
14 & 15 Geo. 5. c. lxiv	Thames Conservancy Act 1924	The Thames Conservancy Act, 1924.	Section forty-eight.
16 & 17 Geo. 5. c. 24	Land Drainage Act 1926	The Land Drainage Act, 1926.	The whole act.
19 & 20 Geo. 5. c. 17	Local Government Act 1929	The Local Government Act, 1929.	In section eighty-one, the words "and any authority, person or body of persons having power to levy a drainage rate."
20 & 21 Geo. 5. c. 8	Land Drainage Act 1929	The Land Drainage Act, 1929.	The whole act.

== Scope ==
The royal commission had identified one hundred catchment areas, based on the main rivers of England and Wales. When the act was published, it contained only 47 catchment areas, listed in part 1 of the first schedule:

- Adur, Sussex
- Alt, Merseyside
- Ancholme and Winterton Beck, Lincolnshire
- Anglesey Rivers, North Wales
- Arun, Sussex
- Avon and Stour, Warwickshire
- Avon (Bristol)
- Clwyd, North Wales
- Conway, North Wales
- Crossens, Merseyside
- Cuckmere, Sussex
- Dee, North Wales
- Derwent, Yorkshire
- Douglas, Lancashire
- Dysynni, Mid Wales
- East Norfolk Rivers (incl. River Waveney)
- East Suffolk Rivers (excl. River Waveney)
- Essex Rivers
- Hull, Yorkshire
- Kent, Cumbria
- Lee, Hertfordshire
- Lune, Lancashire
- Medway, Kent
- Mersey (above Irlam Weir) and Irwell (above Hunt's Bank)
- Nene, East of England
- North Norfolk Rivers
- Old Haven (Pevensey) and Bulverhythe Stream, Sussex
- Ouse (Great), East of England
- Ouse (Sussex), Sussex
- Ouse (Yorks), Yorkshire
- Prysor, Gwynedd
- Roding, Essex
- Romney and Denge Marsh Main Drains, Kent
- Rother and Jury's Gut, East Sussex
- Severn, England - Wales border
- Somerset Rivers
- Stour (Essex and Suffolk)
- Stour, Kent
- Thames above Teddington Lock, South of England
- Thaw, South Wales
- Trent, Central England
- Waver and Wampool, Cumbria
- Weaver, Cheshire
- Welland, East of England
- Witham and Steeping River, Lincolnshire
- Wye, Welsh borders
- Wyre, Lancashire

A catchment board was set up for all but one of these areas by November 1931, with responsibility for the drainage of 67 per cent of England and Wales. Section 84 of the act specifically excluded any jurisdiction over Scotland or Northern Ireland, while section 65 limited the application of the act to any drainage board which was within the Doncaster Drainage District. This was because the First Report of the Royal Commission on Mining Subsidence (1926) had identified the problems of the Doncaster area as being particularly severe, and as a result, a second commission had looked specifically at that area. It reported in 1928, and the Doncaster Area Drainage Act 1929 (19 & 20 Geo. 5. c. xvii) was passed, creating the Doncaster Central Board. Section 65 sought to ensure that the role of the new catchment board would not conflict with the role of the central board.

Some reorganisation of the catchment boards occurred while the act was in force. On 30 November 1936, the Kent Rivers Catchment Area and Catchment Board were formed, by combining the catchment boards for the River Medway, the Romney and Denge Marsh Main Drains, the River Stour (Kent) and the North Kent Rivers. The first three were listed in the act, but the North Kent Rivers catchment area was not, and so was presumably set up afterwards.

The River Thaw Catchment Board, as mentioned in the act, was set up in September 1931, and took over the river functions of the River Thaw Drainage Board. The Mid Glamorgan Rivers Catchment Board was created in late 1932, and in early 1933, took over the powers and responsibilities of the River Thaw Catchment Board, which was then dissolved. Rivers in the catchment were the Thaw and Kenson, the Ogmore and Ewenny, the Cadoxton (with Sully), the Avon and the Neath. Two new internal drainage boards were set up, the Cadoxton IDB and the Baglan and Aberavon Moors IDB, but while these were administered by the catchment board, the River Thaw Drainage Board was administered by Glamorgan County Council.

== Subsequent developments ==
The whole act was repealed by section 117(3) of, and schedule 8 to, the Land Drainage Act 1976, which came into force on 17 January 1977.

== Bibliography ==
- Anon (10 December 1932). "Land Drainage". Nature. 130 (3293): 875. Bibcode:1932Natur.130Q.875.. doi:10.1038/130875a0.
- Dobson, Alban; Hull, Hubert (1931). The Land Drainage Act 1930. Oxford University Press.
- Darby, H.C. (1956). The Draining of the Fens (2nd Ed.). Cambridge: Cambridge University Press. ISBN 978-1-107-40298-0.
- Williams, Michael (1970). The Draining of the Somerset Levels. Cambridge: Cambridge University Press. ISBN 978-0-521-07486-5.
- Wisdom, A S (1966). Land Drainage. London: Sweet & Maxwell.
