= Salmon Fishery Act 1861 =

Act of the Parliament of the United Kingdom

Salmon Fishery Act 1861 (Note: Section 1.)
- Act of Parliament
- Parliament of the United Kingdom
- Long title: An Act to amend the Laws relating to Fisheries of Salmon in England.
- Citation: 24 & 25 Vict. c. 109
- Territorial extent: England and Wales (Note: Section 2.)

Dates
- Royal assent: 6 August 1861
- Commencement: 1 October 1861 (Note: Section 3.)
- Repealed: 1 January 1924
Other legislation
Amends	See § Repealed enactments
Repeals/revokes	See § Repealed enactments
Amended by	Salmon Fishery Act 1865
Repealed by	Salmon and Freshwater Fisheries Act 1923

Status: Repealed

Text of statute as originally enacted

The Salmon Fishery Act 1861 (24 & 25 Vict. c. 109) was an act of the Parliament of the United Kingdom that consolidated enactments related to fisheries of salmon in England.

== Provisions ==
=== Repealed enactments ===
Section 39 of the act repealed 33 enactments, listed in the schedule to the act.

Public Acts
Citation	Short title	Description	Extent of repeal
13 Ed. 1. Stat. 1. c. 47	Salmon Preservation Act 1285	A Penalty for taking of Salmon at certain Times of the Year.	The whole act.
25 Ed. 3. Stat. 4. c. 4	N/A	"New Weirs shall be pulled down and not repaired."	The whole act.
45 Ed. 3. c. 2	Weirs	The Penalty of him that setteth up or enhanceth Wares.	The whole act.
13 Rich. 2. Stat. 1. c. 19	Fish Act 1389	A Confirmation of Stat. 13 Ed. 1. Stat. 1. c. 47.	The whole act.
17 Rich. 2. c. 9	Fish	Justices of Peace shall be Conservators of the Statutes made touching Salmon.	The whole act.
1 Hen. 4. c. 12	N/A	A Confirmation of former Statutes touching pulling down of Wears.	The whole act.
4 Hen. 4. c. 11	Weirs Act 1402	Commissions shall be awarded to Justices, &c. to inquire of Wears and Kidels, &c.	The whole act.
2 Hen. 6. c. 19	Fish	No Man shall fasten Nets to anything over Rivers.	The whole act.
12 Ed. 4. c. 7	Weirs Act 1472	An Act for the taking away Wears and Fishgarthes.	The whole act.
11 Hen. 7. c. 5	Weirs Act 1495	Every Man may pull down the Wears and Engines in the Haven of Southampton, &c.	The whole act.
14 & 15 Hen. 8. c. 13	Port of Southampton Act 1523	A Confirmation of the Statute 11 Hen. 7. c. 5., and the same made perpetual.	The whole act.
23 Hen. 8. c. 18	Fish Act 1531	For pulling down Piles and Fishgarths in the Rivers Ouse and Humber.	The whole act.
1 Eliz. c. 17	Fisheries Act 1558	An Act for the Preservation of Spawn and Fry of Fish.	The whole act.
3 Car. 1. c. 5	Continuance of Laws, etc. Act 1627	An Act for Continuance and Repeal of divers Statutes.	The first section of the act.
3 Jas. 1. c. 12	Fish Act 1605	An Act for the better Preservation of Sea Fish.	The whole act.
30 Car. 2. c. 9	Fishing in the Severn Act 1678	An Act for the better Preservation of Fishing in the River of Severn.	The whole act.
4 Ann. c. 21 (Note: This is the citation in The Statutes at Large.)	Fish Act 1705	An Act for the Increase and better Preservation of Salmon and other Fish in the Rivers within the Counties of Southampton and Wiltshire.	The whole act.
9 Ann. c. 26	Thames Fishery Act 1710	An Act for the better Preservation and Improvement of Fishery within the River of Thames, and for regulating and governing the Company of Fishermen of the said River.	The second section of the act.
1 Geo. 1. Stat. 2. c. 18	Fish Act 1714	An Act for the better preventing Fresh Fish taken by Foreigners being imported into this Kingdom, and for the Preservation of the Fry of Fish, and for the giving Leave to import Lobsters and Tributs in Foreign Bottoms, and for the better Preservation of Salmon within several Rivers in that Part of this Kingdom called England.	Sections 11 to 16 inclusive.
23 Geo. 2. c. 26	Continuance of Laws, etc. Act 1749	An Act to continue several Laws for the better Regulation of Pilots for the conducting of Ships and Vessels from Dover, Deal, and Isle of Thanet up the River of Thames and Medway, and for permitting Rum or Spirits of the British Sugar Plantations to be landed before the Duties of Excise are paid thereon, and to continue and amend an Act for preventing Frauds on the Admeasurement of Coals within the City and Liberty of Westminster and several Parishes near thereunto, and to continue several Laws for preventing Exactions of Occupiers of Locks and Wears upon the River Thames westward, and for ascertaining the Rates of Water Carriage upon the said River, and for the better Regulation and Government of Seamen in the Merchants Service; and also to amend so much of an Act made in the First Year of the Reign of King George the First as relates to the better Preservation of Salmon in the River Ribble, and to regulate Fees in Trials at Assizes and Nisi Prius upon Records issuing out of the Office of Pleas of the Court of Exchequer, and for the apprehending of Persons in any County or Place upon Warrant granted by Justices of the Peace in any other County or Place, and to repeal so much of an Act made in the 12th Year of the Reign of King Charles the Second as relates to the Time during which the Office of Excise is to be kept open each Day, and to appoint for how long Time the same shall be kept open upon each Day for the future, and to prevent the dealing or destroying of Turnips, and to amend an Act made in the Second Year of His present Majesty for better Regulation of Attorneys and Solicitors.	Sections 7, 8, and 9.
33 Geo. 2. c. 27	Fish Act 1759	An Act to repeal so much of an Act passed in the Twenty-ninth Year of His present Majesty's Reign concerning a free Market for Fish at Westminster as requires Fishermen to enter their Fishing Vessels at the Office of the Searcher of the Customs at Gravesend, and to regulate the Sale of Fish at the First Hand in the Fish Markets in London and Westminster, and to prevent Salesmen of Fish buying Fish to sell again on their own Account, and to allow Biet and Turbot, Brill and Pear, although under the respective Dimensions mentioned in a former Act, to be imported and sold, and to punish any Persons who shall take or sell any Spawn, Brood, or Fry of Fish, unsizeable Fish, or Fish out of Season, or Smelts under the Size of Five Inches, and for other Purposes.	Section 13.
18 Geo. 3. c. 33	Fisheries (Severn and Verniew) Act 1778	An Act for the better Preservation of Fish, and regulating the Fisheries in the Rivers Severn and Verniew.	In so far as it relates to Salmon.
37 Geo. 3. c. 95	Hampshire and Wiltshire Fisheries Act 1797	An Act to amend Two Acts made in the Fourth Year of the Reign of Queen Anne and the First Year of the Reign of King George the First, for the Preservation of Salmon and other Fish in the Rivers within the Counties of Southampton and Wilts.	In so far as it relates to Salmon.
58 Geo. 3. c. 43	Salmon Fisheries (England) Act 1818	An Act for preventing the Destruction of the Breed of Salmon and Fish of Salmon Kind in the Rivers of England.	The whole act.
6 & 7 Vict. c. 33	Salmon Fisheries Act 1843	An Act to repeal so much of an Act of the First Year of King George the First as limits the Time for taking and being restrained from taking Salmon in certain Rivers, and to amend and extend the Provisions of an Act of the Fifty-eighth Year of King George the Third to the Rivers therein mentioned.	The whole act.
11 & 12 Vict. c. 52	Salmon Fisheries Act 1848	An Act to explain the Acts for preventing the Destruction of the Breed of Salmon and Fish of the Salmon Kind.	The whole act.

Private Acts relating to Salmon Fisheries
Citation	Short title	Rivers affected	Extent of repeal
43 Geo. 3. c. lxi	Dart, Teign and Plym Fisheries Act 1803	Teign, Dart, and Plym, Devon	The whole act.
44 Geo. 3. c. xlv	Solway Firth Fisheries Act 1804	Rivers flowing into the Solway Firth	The whole act, except in so far as it relates to Scotland, and to Fish other than Salmon in England
45 Geo. 3. c. xxxiii	Carmarthen Fisheries Act 1805	Carmarthenshire Rivers	The whole act.
46 Geo. 3. c. xix	Milford Harbour Fisheries Act 1806	Rivers running into Milford Harbour	In so far as it relates to Salmon
49 Geo. 3. c. ii	River Derwent (Cumberland) Fishery Act 1809	Lord Lonsdale's Fisheries in Derwent	The whole act.
5 & 6 Vict. c. lxiii	Tyne Fisheries Act 1842	Tyne	The whole act.
21 & 22 Vict. c. cxli	Tees Conservancy Act 1858	Tees	So much of sections 63 and 64 as relates to the making of byelaws for the regulation of salmon fisheries

== Subsequent developments ==
The whole act was repealed by section 93(1) of, and the fifth schedule to, the Salmon and Freshwater Fisheries Act 1923 (13 & 14 Geo. 5. c. 16), which came into operation on 1 January 1924.
