= Rivers (Prevention of Pollution) Act 1951 =

Act of the Parliament of the United Kingdom

Rivers (Prevention of Pollution) Act 1951 (Note: Section 12(1).)
- Act of Parliament
- Parliament of the United Kingdom
- Long title: An Act to make new provision for maintaining or restoring the wholesomeness of the rivers and other inland or coastal waters of England and Wales in place of the Rivers Pollution Prevention Act, 1876, and certain other enactments; and to provide for laying before Parliament the annual reports of river boards.
- Citation: 14 & 15 Geo. 6. c. 64
- Territorial extent: England and Wales (Note: Section 12(3).)

Dates
- Royal assent: 1 August 1951
- Commencement: 1 October 1951 (Note: Section 12(4).)
Other legislation
Amends	See § Repealed enactments
Repeals/revokes	See § Repealed enactments
Amended by	Rivers (Prevention of Pollution) Act 1961; Water Act 1973; Statute Law (Repeals) Act 1974; Control of Pollution Act 1974; Criminal Justice Act 1982
Relates to	Rivers (Prevention of Pollution) (Scotland) Act 1951

Status: Partially repealed

Text of statute as originally enacted

Revised text of statute as amended

Text of the Rivers (Prevention of Pollution) Act 1951 as in force today (including any amendments) within the United Kingdom, from legislation.gov.uk.

The Rivers (Prevention of Pollution) Act 1951 (14 & 15 Geo. 6. c. 64) is an act of the Parliament of the United Kingdom that made new provision for maintaining or restoring the wholesomeness of rivers and other inland or coastal waters in England and Wales in place of the Rivers Pollution Prevention Act 1876 (39 & 40 Vict. c. 75) and certain other enactments.

The Rivers (Prevention of Pollution) (Scotland) Act 1951 (14 & 15 Geo. 6. c. 66) made similar provisions for Scotland.

== Provisions ==
=== Repealed enactments ===
Section 12(2) of the act repealed 14 enactments, listed in the third schedule to the act.

Citation	Short title	Extent of repeal
38 & 39 Vict. c. 55	Public Health Act 1875	Section sixty-nine, except as respects proceedings instituted before the coming into force of this Act.
39 & 40 Vict. c. 75	Rivers Pollution Prevention Act 1876	The whole act, except section seven.
51 & 52 Vict. c. 41	Local Government Act 1888	Section fourteen.
56 & 57 Vict. c. 31	Rivers Pollution Prevention Act 1893	The whole act.
57 & 58 Vict. c. clxvi	West Riding of Yorkshire Rivers Act 1894	The whole act, except section four.
61 & 62 Vict. c. 34	Rivers Pollution Prevention (Border Councils) Act 1898	The whole act.
13 & 14 Geo. 5. c. 16	Salmon and Freshwater Fisheries Act 1923	Subsection (2) of section eight and section fifty-five.
20 & 21 Geo. 5. c. 44	Land Drainage Act 1930	Section fifty-six; paragraph (a) of, and the proviso to, section seventy-three.
23 & 24 Geo. 5. c. xlv	Essex County Council Act 1933	Sections twenty-one to twenty-six; in section thirty, paragraph (c) of subsection (1) and subsection (6); sections thirty-one, thirty-two, thirty-six and thirty-seven; subsection (1) of section forty-three; in subsection (1) of section forty-seven, the words "pollution or "; in section fifty-one the words "the Rivers Pollution Prevention Acts, 1876 and 1893, or"; subsection (2) of section fifty-two.
24 & 25 Geo. 5. c. 40	Administration of Justice (Appeals) Act 1934	In Part I of the Schedule, the entry relating to section eleven of the Rivers Pollution Prevention Act, 1876.
1 & 2 Geo. 6. c. xciv	Lancashire County Council (Rivers Board and General Powers) Act 1938	Section six; Part IV; section seventy-four; Part VII.
7 & 8 Geo. 6. c. xxi	Middlesex County Council Act 1944	Sections one hundred and forty-eight, one hundred and forty-nine, one hundred and fifty-one to one hundred and fifty-five, and one hundred and fifty-seven; in subsection (1) of section one hundred and sixty-one, the words "pollution or "; paragraphs (2) and (3) of and the proviso to section one hundred and sixty-five; in section one hundred and seventy-one the words "under the Rivers Pollution Prevention Acts, 1876 and 1893, or"; subsection (1) to the last "and" and subsection (2) of section one hundred and seventy-seven.
11 & 12 Geo. 6. c. 32	River Boards Act 1948	In subsection (1) of section four the words "section sixty-nine of the Public Health Act, 1875, the Rivers Pollution Prevention Act, 1876, and"; paragraph (b) of subsection (1) of section five; subsection (1) of section thirty-seven; in the Third Schedule, in paragraph 2 the word "fifty-six", in paragraph 10 the words "subsection (1) of section fifty-five", paragraph 14 (except as respects proceedings instituted before the coming into force of this Act) and paragraphs 15 and 16.
11 & 12 Geo. 6. c. xliii	Cumberland County Council Act 1948	Sections thirty-nine to forty-five; in section forty-six, paragraphs (b) and (c) of subsection (1) and subsection (6); sections forty-seven and forty-eight; subsection (2) of section fifty-three; in section eighty-four, paragraphs (1), (2), (3) and (5) and in paragraph (4) the words "and section forty (notice for discontinuance of pollution)".

== Subsequent developments ==
In section 1(1), the words from " and this Act " onwards, section 12(2) of, and schedules 1 and 3 to, the act were repealed by section 1 of, and part XI of the schedule to, the Statute Law (Repeals) Act 1974, which came into force on 27 June 1974.

Sections 1 to 4, 5(1)(a) and (b), 5(2) to (5), 6 to 10, the First Schedule, the Second Schedule, and the Third Schedule to the act were repealed by the Control of Pollution Act 1974, which came into force through a series of commencement orders between 1974 and 1985. The remaining provisions of the act — comprising parts of sections 5, 11 and 12 — continue in force.
