= Michael Williams (geographer) =

Michael Williams, FBA (1935–2009) was a Welsh historical geographer, known particularly for his work on deforestation. His book, "Deforesting the earth: from pre-history to global crisis" is the most comprehensive account ever written of when, where, and how humans have wrought what is surely the most dramatic change in Earth's surface since the end of the Pleistocene...about every aspect of human use of the forest and the forces that drive this use. He had a personal chair at the University of Oxford from 1996.

== Life ==
He was the second son of Benjamin Williams and his wife, Ethel Mary Marshell of Swansea, born in Rheanfa House Maternity Hospital. He studied at University College, Swansea from 1953, and fell under the influence of the geographer Frank Emery. He graduated B.A. in 1956, and Ph.D. in 1960 with a thesis on the Somerset Levels. By that time married, he moved on to St Catharine's College, Cambridge, working for an education diploma.

Later in 1960, Williams took a lecturing post at the University of Adelaide, becoming reader in 1970. In 1978 he went to the University of Oxford, where he was a reader from 1990, professor from 1996, and a Fellow of Oriel College. He was elected a fellow of the British Academy in 1989.

Professor emeritus from 2002, Williams died of adult respiratory distress syndrome on 26 October 2009.

== Works ==
Williams's books included:

- The Draining of the Somerset Levels (1970)
- The Making of the South Australian Landscape (1976)
- The Changing Rural Landscape of South Australia (1977)
- Americans and their Forests (1989), Charles A. Weyerhaeuser Book Award of the American Forest and Conservation Society
- Deforesting the Earth, from Prehistory to Global Crisis (2003), Weyerhaeuser Book Award and Meridian Prize of the Association of American Geographers.
