= River board =

Authorities controlling drainage and rivers

River boards were authorities who controlled land drainage, fisheries and river pollution and had other functions relating to rivers, streams and inland waters in England and Wales between 1950 and 1965.

== Background ==
Prior to the 1930s, land drainage in the United Kingdom was regulated by the Statute of Sewers, passed by King Henry VIII in 1531, and several further acts which built upon that foundation. However, the administrative bodies with responsibility for managing the drainage of low-lying areas did not have sufficient resources to do this effectively. Complaints to the Ministry of Agriculture and Fisheries made during the 1920s by existing drainage boards and those who lived and worked in the areas they covered led to the government deciding that a thorough review of the situation should be carried out.

A royal commission was set up, under the chairmanship of Lord Bledisloe, which produced a final report on 5 December 1927. The report described the existing laws as "vague and ill-defined, full of anomalies, obscure, lacking in uniformity, and even chaotic." It recommended that any replacement should have powers to carry out the work necessary for efficient drainage, together with the provision of financial resources to enable them to carry out their duties.

At the time there were 361 drainage authorities covering England and Wales, and the proposed solution was the creation of catchment boards responsible for each main river, with powers over the individual drainage boards within each catchment. The report formed the basis for a subsequent bill, which became the Land Drainage Act 1930 (20 & 21 Geo. 5. c. 44) when it became law on 1 August 1930. It repealed most of the legislation that had preceded it, with 16 acts dating from 1531 to 1929 falling into this category, and another three were amended. When the Act was published, however, it contained only 47 catchment areas of the original 100 suggested by the Royal Commission.

== River Boards Act 1948 ==
River boards were established by the River Boards Act 1948, and replaced the catchment boards that had been created following the passing of the Land Drainage Act 1930. Although the River Boards Act 1948 proposed river board areas, the precise details were not included in the legislation, and a consultative committee was convened to resolve issues with the boundaries for the areas. This involved liaising with catchment boards, fishery boards, county councils and county boroughs.

By 19 May 1949, the borders of 17 areas had been settled, and a draft order to create the first river board, that for the River Severn, had been deposited before Parliament. A total of 32 boards were eventually created, covering the whole of England and Wales, with responsibilities for land drainage, fisheries and river pollution. Where there were existing catchment boards, they inherited these powers, and where there were not, they took over the duties of flood prevention on main rivers from local authorities. The provisions of the 1930 act ceased to apply to the new river boards. The exceptions were the River Thames Catchment Board and the Lee Conservancy Catchment Board, which did not become river boards, and still operated under the older powers. Each river board area had a board which was partly nominated by county councils and county borough corporations, and partly appointed by the government.

The act allowed that "orders defining river board areas and establishing river boards may be made at different times for different areas". It was not until 1955 that all the boards had been established.

River board	Former catchment boards
Avon and Dorset	
Bristol Avon	Avon (Bristol)
Cheshire	Weaver
Cornwall	
Cumberland	Kent, Waver and Wampool
Dee and Clwyd	Clwyd, Dee
Devon	
East Suffolk and Norfolk	East Norfolk Rivers (including the river Waveney), East Suffolk Rivers, North Norfolk Rivers
East Sussex	Cuckmere, Old Haven (Pevensey) and Bulverhythe Stream, Ouse (Sussex)
Essex	Essex Rivers, Roding, Stour (Essex and Suffolk)
Glamorgan	Thaw
Great Ouse	Ouse (Great)
Gwynedd	Anglesey Rivers, Conway, Dysynni, Prysor
Hampshire	Avon and Stour
Hull and East Yorkshire	Hull
Isle of Wight	
Kent	Medway, Romney and Denge Marsh Main Drains, Rother and Jury's Gut, Stour (Kent)
Lancashire	Crossens, Douglas, Lune, Wyre
Lincolnshire	Ancholme and Winterton Beck, Witham and Steeping River
Mersey	Alt, Mersey and Irwell
Nene	Nene
Northumberland and Tyneside	
Severn	Severn
Somerset	Somerset Rivers
South West Wales	
Trent	Trent
Usk	
Wear and Tees	
Welland	Welland
West Sussex	Adur, Arun
Wye	Wye
Yorkshire Ouse	Derwent, Ouse (Yorkshire)

The powers of river boards were extended by the Land Drainage Act 1961, which allowed them to raise additional finance and to act as an internal drainage board (IDB) where land drainage was necessary for the improvement of agricultural land, but no IDB existed. The river boards were replaced by twenty-seven river authorities on 1 April 1965, under the Water Resources Act 1963. The new authorities comprised the area of one or two river boards.

== See also ==
- Internal drainage board

== Bibliography ==
- Anon (10 December 1932). "Land Drainage". Nature. 130 (3293): 875. Bibcode:1932Natur.130Q.875.. doi:10.1038/130875a0.
- Dobson, Alban; Hull, Hubert (1931). The Land Drainage Act 1930. Oxford University Press.
- Darby, H.C. (1956). The Draining of the Fens (2nd Ed.). Cambridge: Cambridge University Press. ISBN 978-1-107-40298-0.
- Wisdom, A S (1966). Land Drainage. London: Sweet & Maxwell.
