= List of acts of the Parliament of England from 1531 =

This is a list of acts of the Parliament of England for the year 1531.

For acts passed during the period 1707–1800, see the list of acts of the Parliament of Great Britain. See also the list of acts of the Parliament of Scotland, and the list of acts of the Parliament of Ireland.

For acts passed from 1801 onwards, see the list of acts of the Parliament of the United Kingdom. For acts of the devolved parliaments and assemblies in the United Kingdom, see the list of acts of the Scottish Parliament, the list of acts of the Northern Ireland Assembly, and the list of acts and measures of Senedd Cymru; see also the list of acts of the Parliament of Northern Ireland.

For medieval statutes, etc. that are not considered to be acts of Parliament, see the list of English statutes.

See also the List of ordinances and acts of the Parliament of England, 1642–1660 for ordinances and acts passed by the Long Parliament and other bodies without royal assent, and which were not considered to be valid legislation following the Restoration in 1660.

The number shown after each act's title is its chapter number. Acts are cited using this number, preceded by the years of the reign during which the relevant parliamentary session was held; thus the Union with Ireland Act 1800 is cited as "39 & 40 Geo. 3. c. 67", meaning the 67th act passed during the session that started in the 39th year of the reign of George III and which finished in the 40th year of that reign. The modern convention is to use Arabic numerals in citations (thus "41 Geo. 3" rather than "41 Geo. III"). Acts of the last session of the Parliament of Great Britain and the first session of the Parliament of the United Kingdom are both cited as "41 Geo. 3".

Acts passed by the Parliament of England did not have a short title; however, some of these acts have subsequently been given a short title by acts of the Parliament of the United Kingdom, such as the Short Titles Act 1896 (59 & 60 Vict. c. 14).

Acts passed by the Parliament of England were deemed to have come into effect on the first day of the session in which they were passed. Because of this, the years given in the list below may in fact be the year before a particular act was passed.

== 23 Hen. 8 ==
The third session of the 5th Parliament of King Henry VIII (the Reformation Parliament), which met at Westminster from 15 January 1532 until 14 May 1532.

This session was also traditionally cited as 23 H. 8.

Note that cc. 21–34 were traditionally cited as private acts cc. 1–14.

Short title	Citation	Royal assent
Long title
Benefit of Clergy Act 1531 (repealed)	23 Hen. 8. c. 1	14 May 1532
An Act that no Person committing Petty Treason, Murder or Felony, shall be admitted to his Clergy, under Subdeacon. (Repealed for England and Wales by Criminal Statutes Repeal Act 1827 (7 & 8 Geo. 4. c. 27) and for India by Criminal Law (India) Act 1828 (9 Geo. 4. c. 74))
Gaols Act 1531 (repealed)	23 Hen. 8. c. 2	14 May 1532
An Act concerning where and under what Manner the Gaols within this Realm shall be edified and made. (Repealed by Statute Law Revision Act 1863 (26 & 27 Vict. c. 125))
Attaints Act 1531 (repealed)	23 Hen. 8. c. 3	14 May 1532
An Act concerning Perjury, and Punishment of untrue Verdicts. (Repealed by Statute Law Revision Act 1863 (26 & 27 Vict. c. 125))
Brewers and Coopers Act 1531 (repealed)	23 Hen. 8. c. 4	14 May 1532
An Act that no Brewers of Beer or Ale shall make their Barrels, Kilderkins nor Firkins, within them; and how much the same Barrels, &c. shall contain. (Repealed by Statute Law Revision Act 1863 (26 & 27 Vict. c. 125))
Statute of Sewers 1531 or the Statute of Sewers Act 1531 (repealed)	23 Hen. 8. c. 5	14 May 1532
A General Act concerning Commissions of Sewers to be directed in all Parts within this Realm. (Repealed by Land Drainage Act 1930 (20 & 21 Geo. 5. c. 44))
Recognizances for Debt Act 1531 or the Statute Staple for Merchandize (repealed)	23 Hen. 8. c. 6	14 May 1532
An Act concerning before whom Recognizances of Debts shall be made, and the Form of the Obligation. (Repealed by Statute Law Revision Act 1863 (26 & 27 Vict. c. 125))
Foreign Wines Act 1531 (repealed)	23 Hen. 8. c. 7	14 May 1532
An Act that the Statutes made for the Maintenance of the Navy of this Realm shall stand in full Strength; and how Gascoigne and French Wines shall be brought in, and the same and other Wines sold. (Repealed by Repeal of Acts Concerning Importation Act 1822 (3 Geo. 4. c. 41))
Tin (Maintenance of Ports in Devon and Cornwall) Act 1531 (repealed)	23 Hen. 8. c. 8	14 May 1532
An Act for the amending and Maintenance of the Havens and Ports of Plymouth, Dartmouth, Teignmouth, Falmouth and Fowey, in the Counties of Devon and Cornwall. (Repealed by Statute Law (Repeals) Act 1978 (c. 45))
Ecclesiastical Jurisdiction Act 1531 (repealed)	23 Hen. 8. c. 9	14 May 1532
An Act that no Person shall be cited out of the Diocese where he or she dwelleth, except in certain Cases. (Repealed by Ecclesiastical Jurisdiction Measure 1963 (No. 1))
Mortmain Act 1531 (repealed)	23 Hen. 8. c. 10	14 May 1532
An Act for Feoffments and Assurances of Lands and Tenements made to the Use of any Parish Church, Chapel or such like. (Repealed by Mortmain and Charitable Uses Act 1888 (51 & 52 Vict. c. 42))
Breaking Prison Act 1531 (repealed)	23 Hen. 8. c. 11	14 May 1532
An Act for breaking of Prison by Clerks convict. (Repealed for England and Wales by Criminal Statutes Repeal Act 1827 (7 & 8 Geo. 4. c. 27) and for India by Criminal Law (India) Act 1828 (9 Geo. 4. c. 74))
Tolls (Severn Side) Act 1531 (repealed)	23 Hen. 8. c. 12	14 May 1532
An Act for taking Exactions upon the Paths of Severn. (Repealed by Statute Law Revision Act 1948 (11 & 12 Geo. 6. c. 62))
Juries in Towns (Qualification) Act 1531 (repealed)	23 Hen. 8. c. 13	14 May 1532
An Act that Men in Cities, Boroughs and Towns, which be clearly worth Forty Pounds in Goods, shall pass in Trial of Murders. (Repealed by Statute Law Revision Act 1948 (11 & 12 Geo. 6. c. 62))
Outlawry Act 1531 (repealed)	23 Hen. 8. c. 14	14 May 1532
Process of Outlawry to lie in Actions on 5 Rich. 2. (Note: 5 Ric. 2) and in Covenant and Annuity. (Repealed by Statute Law Revision Act 1863 (26 & 27 Vict. c. 125))
Costs Act 1531 (repealed)	23 Hen. 8. c. 15	14 May 1532
An Act that the Defendant shall recover Costs against the Plaintiff, if the Plaintiff be nonsuited, or if the Verdict pass against him. (Repealed by Statute Law Revision and Civil Procedure Act 1883 (46 & 47 Vict. c. 49))
Conveyance of Horses into Scotland Act 1531 (repealed)	23 Hen. 8. c. 16	14 May 1532
An Act that no Englishman shall sell, exchange or deliver, to be conveyed into Scotland, any Horse, Gelding or Mare, without the King's Licence. (Repealed by Statute Law Revision Act 1863 (26 & 27 Vict. c. 125))
Winding of Wool Act 1531 (repealed)	23 Hen. 8. c. 17	14 May 1532
An Act for true winding of Wools. (Repealed by Statute Law Revision Act 1863 (26 & 27 Vict. c. 125))
Fish Act 1531 (repealed)	23 Hen. 8. c. 18	14 May 1532
An Act for pulling down and avoiding of Fish-garths, Piles, Stakes, Hecks and other Engines set in the River and Water of Ouse and Humber. (Repealed by Salmon Fishery Act 1861 (24 & 25 Vict. c. 109))
Pardon to Clergy Act 1531 (repealed)	23 Hen. 8. c. 19	14 May 1532
An Act concerning the King's gracious Pardon of Premunire granted unto his Spiritual Subjects of the Province of York. (Repealed by Statute Law Revision Act 1863 (26 & 27 Vict. c. 125))
Payment of Annates Act 1531 (repealed)	23 Hen. 8. c. 20 (Note: Listed in the "Appendix of obsolete and curious Acts" in The Statutes at Large.)	14 May 1532
An Act concerning Restraint of Payment of Annates to the See of Rome. (Repealed by Statute Law Revision Act 1888 (51 & 52 Vict. c. 3) and Statute Law (Repeals) Act 1969 (c. 52))
Exchange of Lands between the King and Abbot of Westminster Act 1531 (repealed)	23 Hen. 8. c. 21 (Note: This is the citation in The Statutes of the Realm.); 23 Hen. 8. c. 1 Pr. (Note: This is the citation in The Statutes at Large.)	14 May 1532
An Act concerning an exchange of certain lands between the King and the abbot of Westminster. (Repealed by Statute Law (Repeals) Act 1978 (c. 45))
Exchange of Lands between the King and Christ's College, Cambridge Act 1531 (repealed)	23 Hen. 8. c. 22; 23 Hen. 8. c. 2 Pr.	14 May 1532
An Act concerning an exchange of certain lands between the King and the master, fellows, and scholars of Christ's college in Cambridge. (Repealed by Statute Law (Repeals) Act 1978 (c. 45))
Exchange of Lands between the King and Abbot of Waltham Act 1531 (repealed)	23 Hen. 8. c. 23; 23 Hen. 8. c. 3 Pr.	14 May 1532
An Act concerning an exchange of certain lands between the King and the abbot of Waltham Holy Cross. (Repealed by Statute Law (Repeals) Act 1978 (c. 45))
Exchange of Lands between the King and Provost of Eton Act 1531 (repealed)	23 Hen. 8. c. 24; 23 Hen. 8. c. 4 Pr.	14 May 1532
An Act concerning an exchange of certain lands between the King and the provost of Eaton. (Repealed by Statute Law (Repeals) Act 1978 (c. 45))
Exchange of Lands between the King and Abbot of St Albans Act 1531 (repealed)	23 Hen. 8. c. 25; 23 Hen. 8. c. 5 Pr.	14 May 1532
An Act concerning an exchange of certain lands between the King and the abbot of St. Albans. (Repealed by Statute Law (Repeals) Act 1978 (c. 45))
Exchange of Lands between the King and Prior of St John of Jerusalem Act 1531 (repealed)	23 Hen. 8. c. 26; 23 Hen. 8. c. 6 Pr.	14 May 1532
An Act concerning an exchange of certain lands between the King and the prior of St. John's of Jerusalem. (Repealed by Statute Law (Repeals) Act 1978 (c. 45))
Exchange of Lands between the King and Prior of Sheene Act 1531 (repealed)	23 Hen. 8. c. 27; 23 Hen. 8. c. 7 Pr.	14 May 1532
An Act concerning an exchange of certain lands between the King and the prior of Sheene. (Repealed by Statute Law (Repeals) Act 1978 (c. 45))
Exchange of Lands between the King, the Duke of Richmond and Lord Lumley Act 1531 (repealed)	23 Hen. 8. c. 28; 23 Hen. 8. c. 8 Pr.	14 May 1532
An Act concerning an exchange of certain lands between the King, the duke of Richmond, and the lord Lumley. (Repealed by Statute Law (Repeals) Act 1978 (c. 45))
Lands of Earl of Surrey Act 1531 (repealed)	23 Hen. 8. c. 29; 23 Hen. 8. c. 9 Pr.	14 May 1532
An Act concerning the assurance if certain lands unton Henry earl of Surrey, in consideration of his marriage. (Repealed by Statute Law (Repeals) Act 1978 (c. 45))
Manor of Hunsdon Act 1531 (repealed)	23 Hen. 8. c. 30; 23 Hen. 8. c. 10 Pr.	14 May 1532
An Act for the united of divers manors, lands, and tenements to the manor of Hunsdon, now called the honor of Hunsdon. (Repealed by Statute Law (Repeals) Act 1978 (c. 45))
Jointure of Countess of Wiltshire Act 1531 (repealed)	23 Hen. 8. c. 31; 23 Hen. 8. c. 11 Pr.	14 May 1532
An Act for the assurance of the jointure of the lady Elizabeth countess of Wiltes. (Repealed by Statute Law (Repeals) Act 1978 (c. 45))
Award to heirs of Earl of Oxford Act 1531 (repealed)	23 Hen. 8. c. 32; 23 Hen. 8. c. 12 Pr.	14 May 1532
An Act concerning an award made by the King, between John earl of Oxford of the one part, and John Nevill knight, lord Latymer, on the behalf of John his son, Anthony Wingfield, and others. (Repealed by Statute Law (Repeals) Act 1978 (c. 45))
Jointure of Dowager Countess of Oxford and Countess of Oxford Act 1531 (repealed)	23 Hen. 8. c. 33; 23 Hen. 8. c. 13 Pr.	14 May 1532
An Act for the assurance of the jointure of the lady Anne, and the lady Elizabeth, countesses of Oxford, Margaret Veere, and others. (Repealed by Statute Law (Repeals) Act 1978 (c. 45))
Attainder of Gruffyth and Hughes Act 1531 (repealed)	23 Hen. 8. c. 34; 23 Hen. 8. c. 14 Pr.	14 May 1532
An Acte concernyng the Atteynder of Rychard ap Gruffyth & Wyllyam Hughes. (Repealed by Statute Law (Repeals) Act 1977 (c. 18))

=== Sources ===
- "23° Hen. VIII". The Statutes of the Realm. Vol. 3: 1509 to 1547. pp. 362–416 – via HathiTrust.
- "23° Hen. VIII". The Statutes of the Realm. Vol. 3: 1509 to 1547. pp. 362–416 – via Google Books.
- "Anno vicesimo tertio Henrici VIII". The Statutes at Large. Vol. 4 - 1 Richard III to 31 Henry VIII - 1483-4 to 1539. pp. 212–251 – via Internet Archive.
- "Anno vicesimo tertio Henrici VIII". The Statutes at Large. Vol. 4 - 1 Richard III to 31 Henry VIII - 1483-4 to 1539. pp. 212–251 – via Internet Archive.
- "Anno vicesimo tertio Henrici VIII". The Statutes at Large. Vol. 4 - 1 Richard III to 31 Henry VIII - 1483-4 to 1539. pp. 212–251 – via Internet Archive.
- Journal of the House of Lords. Vol. 1: 1509-1577. London: His Majesty's Stationery Office. 1830 – via British History Online.
- Chronological Table of and Index to the Statutes. Vol. 1: To the End of the Session 59 Vict. Sess. 2 (1895) (13th ed.). London: Her Majesty's Stationery Office. 1896. pp. 46–47 – via Google Books.
- Chronological Table of the Statutes: Covering the Period from 1235 to the End of 1971. London: Her Majesty's Stationery Office. 1972. p. 42. ISBN 978-0-11-840096-1 – via Google Books.

== See also ==
- List of acts of the Parliament of England
