= Statute of Sewers =

Act of the Parliament of England

Statute of Sewers 1531
- Act of Parliament
- Parliament of England
- Long title: A general Act concerning Commissions of Sewers to be directed in all parts within the Realm.
- Citation: 23 Hen. 8. c. 5
- Territorial extent: England and Wales

Dates
- Royal assent: 14 May 1532
- Commencement: 15 January 1532 (Note: Start of session.)
- Expired: 15 January 1552 (Note: Section 20. Twenty years.)
- Repealed: 1 August 1930

Other legislation
- Amended by: Continuance of Statute of Sewers Act 1549; Statute Law Revision Act 1863; Statute Law Revision Act 1888
- Repealed by: Land Drainage Act 1930
- Relates to: Thames Commission of Sewers Act 1605

Status: Repealed

Text of statute as originally enacted

Continuance of Statute of Sewers Act 1549
- Act of Parliament
- Parliament of England
- Long title: An Act for the Continuance of the Statute of Sewers.
- Citation: 3 & 4 Edw. 6. c. 8
- Territorial extent: England and Wales

Dates
- Royal assent: 1 February 1550
- Commencement: 4 November 1549
- Repealed: 1 August 1930

Other legislation
- Amends: Statute of Sewers 1531
- Repealed by: Land Drainage Act 1930
- Relates to: Thames Commission of Sewers Act 1605

Status: Repealed

Text of statute as originally enacted

The Statute of Sewers (23 Hen. 8. c. 5) was an act enacted by the English Reformation Parliament of King Henry VIII, passed in 1532. It sought to make the powers of various commissions of sewers permanent, whereas previously, each parliament had to renew their powers.

It is noted as one of the earliest occurrences in English legal history of a Henry VIII power. The statute gave the commissions of sewers legislative powers, the power to impose taxation upon landowners, and the power to impose penalties for the non-payment of those taxes. Specifically, they could charge a rate on any person "who hath or holdeth any lands or tenements or common of pasture or profit of fishing or hath or may have any hurt loss or disadvantage" who lived within the area of responsibility of the Commissioners. This was the principle of benefit, and was challenged in the courts in 1609 at Keighley and the Isle of Ely. The courts on those occasions upheld the concept that rates could be levied for land that derived or would derive benefit, or had avoided or would avoid danger as a result of the work of the Commissioners. This principle was consistently upheld in the courts by a number of cases that were contested between 1788 and 1905, and remained the case until the passing of the Land Drainage Act 1930 (20 & 21 Geo. 5. c. 44).

Although the act legitimised or created commissions of sewers for most of the areas of marshland within the country, Romney Marshes in Kent were specifically excluded, and the Lords, Bailiff and Jurats of Romney Marsh continued to operate as they had previously done.

The act was also intended to remove obstructions from rivers, such as mills, weirs and fish traps, with Thomas Cromwell, the king's chief minister at the time stating: "An Act that never weir nor water-mill shall hereafter be erected or made within this realm." The implementation of the act resulted in the destruction of large numbers of such structures between 1535 and 1539, with the king himself suffering a loss of income when his own mills and weirs were destroyed. The commission of sewers for Hampshire was set up on 28 January 1535, and demolition of mills on the River Itchen started in mid- or late-1535. The mayor and citizens of Winchester wrote to Cromwell in 1536 to express their thanks that young salmon were once again appearing in the river, and that areas of land which had previously been flooded were now dry. However, not everyone was keen on the measures, with the letter noting that the Bishop of Winchester was unhappy about the destruction of his installation at Woodmill, and that there was opposition to carrying out the objects of the act in Hampshire by "the great lords and their officials".

This approach was relatively short-lived, with officials at Hereford Cathedral and residents of the city asking Parliament to allow them to rebuild four mills in 1555, as their destruction had caused unemployment and poverty. Their request was granted, and the Bishop of Winchester's Woodmill was reconstructed around 1570.

== Subsequent developments ==
Section 20 of the act provided that the act would expire after 20 years. The act was made perpetual by the Continuance of Statute of Sewers Act 1549 (3 & 4 Edw. 6. c. 8).

The whole act was repealed by section 83(1) of, and the seventh schedule to, the Land Drainage Act 1930 (20 & 21 Geo. 5. c. 44), which came into force on 1 August 1930.

== See also ==
- Marsh law

== Bibliography ==
- Eddison, Jill (2000). Romney Marsh: Survival on a frontier. History Press. ISBN 978-0-7524-1486-7.
- Langdon, John; White, James (2017). "An early seventeenth-century river environment: the 1618 survey of the Itchen" (PDF). Proceedings of the Hampshire Field Club Archaeological Society. 72: 142–165. doi:10.24202/hs2017001 (inactive 1 July 2025). Archived (PDF) from the original on 9 August 2024.
- Wisdom, A S (1966). Land Drainage. London: Sweet & Maxwell.
