= Solomon Islands Act 1978 =

Act of the Parliament of the United Kingdom

Solomon Islands Act 1978 (Note: Section 10.)
- Act of Parliament
- Parliament of the United Kingdom
- Long title: An Act to make provision for, and in connection with, the attainment by Solomon Islands of independence within the Commonwealth.
- Citation: 1978 c. 15
- Territorial extent: United Kingdom

Dates
- Royal assent: 25 May 1978
- Commencement: 7 July 1978 (Note: Section 1(1).)
Other legislation
Amends	Merchant Shipping Act 1894; Colonial Stock Act 1877; Imperial Institute Act 1925; Visiting Forces (British Commonwealth) Act 1933; Whaling Industry (Regulation) Act 1934; British Nationality Act 1948; Visiting Forces Act 1952; Army Act 1955; Air Force Act 1955; Naval Discipline Act 1957; Diplomatic Immunities (Conferences with Commonwealth Countries and Republic of Ireland) Act 1961
Amended by	Interpretation Act 1978; British Nationality Act 1981; Armed Forces Act 2006; Statute Law (Repeals) Act 1986; Merchant Shipping Act 1995; Statute Law (Repeals) Act 1995; International Organisations Act 1981; Civil Aviation (Amendment) Act 1982; Statute Law (Repeals) Act 1998; Commonwealth Act 2002

Status: Amended

Text of statute as originally enacted

Revised text of statute as amended

Text of the Solomon Islands Act 1978 as in force today (including any amendments) within the United Kingdom, from legislation.gov.uk.

The Solomon Islands Act 1978 (c. 15) is an act of the Parliament of the United Kingdom. The act annexed the British Solomon Islands protectorate by providing that as from 7 July 1978 the territories comprised within the protectorate would form part of Her Majesty’s dominions under the name of Solomon Islands. The Act also provided that from the same date, Her Majesty’s Government in the United Kingdom would have no responsibility for the government of the Solomon Islands.

Independence within the British Commonwealth could not be attained by a dependent territory such as the Solomon Islands protectorate without legislation passed at Westminster. The grant of independence to Solomon Islands was achieved by two separate legislative operations, namely, the passing of the Act and the making of the Solomon Islands Independence Order 1978. Together those statutes comprised Solomon Islands’ constitution at independence in 1978. At independence the country became the thirty-seventh member of the British Commonwealth of Nations.

== Subsequent developments ==
Section 8 of the act was repealed by section 1(1) of, and group 2 of part I of schedule 1 to, the Statute Law (Repeals) Act 1986, which came into force on 2 May 1986.
