= List of acts of the Parliament of the United Kingdom from 1931 =

This is a complete list of acts of the Parliament of the United Kingdom for the year 1931.

Note that the first parliament of the United Kingdom was held in 1801; parliaments between 1707 and 1800 were either parliaments of Great Britain or of Ireland). For acts passed up until 1707, see the list of acts of the Parliament of England and the list of acts of the Parliament of Scotland. For acts passed from 1707 to 1800, see the list of acts of the Parliament of Great Britain. See also the list of acts of the Parliament of Ireland.

For acts of the devolved parliaments and assemblies in the United Kingdom, see the list of acts of the Scottish Parliament, the list of acts of the Northern Ireland Assembly, and the list of acts and measures of Senedd Cymru; see also the list of acts of the Parliament of Northern Ireland.

The number shown after each act's title is its chapter number. Acts passed before 1963 are cited using this number, preceded by the year(s) of the reign during which the relevant parliamentary session was held; thus the Union with Ireland Act 1800 is cited as "39 & 40 Geo. 3 c. 67", meaning the 67th act passed during the session that started in the 39th year of the reign of George III and which finished in the 40th year of that reign. Note that the modern convention is to use Arabic numerals in citations (thus "41 Geo. 3" rather than "41 Geo. III"). Acts of the last session of the Parliament of Great Britain and the first session of the Parliament of the United Kingdom are both cited as "41 Geo. 3". Acts passed from 1963 onwards are simply cited by calendar year and chapter number.

== 21 & 22 Geo. 5 ==
Continuing the second session of the 35th Parliament of the United Kingdom, which met from 28 October 1930 until 7 October 1931.

This session was also traditionally cited as 21 & 22 G. 5

=== Public general acts ===
Short title	Citation	Royal assent
Long title
Education (Local Authorities) Act 1931 (repealed)	21 & 22 Geo. 5. c. 6	3 March 1931
An Act to prevent the constitution of new local education authorities by reason only of the creation of new boroughs, or other urban districts, or the extension of the boundaries of existing boroughs or urban districts. (Repealed by Education Act 1944 (7 & 8 Geo. 6. c. 31))
China Indemnity (Application) Act 1931	21 & 22 Geo. 5. c. 7	3 March 1931
An Act to make further provision with respect to the application of the China Indemnity Fund and of moneys paid on account of the China Indemnity.
Unemployment Insurance Act 1931 (repealed)	21 & 22 Geo. 5. c. 8	3 March 1931
An Act to raise to ninety million pounds the limit on the amount of the advances by the Treasury to the Unemployment Fund which may be outstanding during the deficiency period, to amend subsection (2) of section fourteen of the Unemployment Insurance Act, 1927, (Note: Unemployment Insurance Act 1927 (17 & 18 Geo. 5. c. 30)) by further extending to forty-two months the period of twelve months therein mentioned, and to make provision for certain other matters in connection with the extension aforesaid. (Repealed by Unemployment Act 1934 (24 & 25 Geo. 5. c. 29))
Colonial Naval Defence Act 1931 (repealed)	21 & 22 Geo. 5. c. 9	3 March 1931
An Act to Amend and consolidate the Colonial Naval Defence Acts, 1865 (Note: Colonial Naval Defence Act 1865 (28 & 29 Vict. c. 14)) and 1909. (Note: Colonial Naval Defence Act 1909 (9 Edw. 7. c. 19)) (Repealed by Armed Forces Act 2006 (c. 52))
Consolidated Fund (No. 2) Act 1931 (repealed)	21 & 22 Geo. 5. c. 10	27 March 1931
An Act to apply certain sums out of the Consolidated Fund to the service of the years ending on the thirty-first day of March, one thousand nine hundred and thirty, one thousand nine hundred and thirty-one and one thousand nine hundred and thirty-two. (Repealed by Statute Law Revision Act 1950 (14 Geo. 6. c. 6))
Acquisition of Land (Assessment of Compensation) (Scotland) Act 1931 (repealed)	21 & 22 Geo. 5. c. 11	27 March 1931
An Act to amend the provisions of the Acquisition of Land (Assessment of Compensation) Act, 1919, (Note: Acquisition of Land (Assessment of Compensation) Act 1919 (9 & 10 Geo. 5. c. 57)) relating to the terms on which official arbitrators in Scotland shall hold office. (Repealed by Land Compensation (Scotland) Act 1963 (c. 51))
Metropolitan Police (Staff Superannuation and Police Fund) Act 1931	21 & 22 Geo. 5. c. 12	27 March 1931
An Act to provide for the granting of compassionate gratuities in respect of officers to whom the Metropolitan Police Staff Superannuation Acts, 1875 (Note: Metropolitan Police Staff (Superannuation) Act 1875 (38 & 39 Vict. c. 28)) and 1885, (Note: Metropolitan Police Staff Superannuation Act 1885 (48 & 49 Vict. c. 68)) apply; to permit commutation of certain of the pensions payable in respect of such officers; and to amend section ten of the Metropolitan Police Act, 1829. (Note: Metropolitan Police Act 1829 (10 Geo. 4. c. 44))
House of Commons Disqualification (Declaration of Law) Act 1931 (repealed)	21 & 22 Geo. 5. c. 13	27 March 1931
An Act to remove doubts as to the scope of the House of Commons (Disqualification) Act, 1782, (Note: House of Commons (Disqualification) Act 1782 (22 Geo. 3. c. 45)) and of section four of the House of Commons (Disqualifications) Act, 1801. (Note: House of Commons (Disqualifications) Act 1801 (41 Geo. 3. (U.K.) c. 52)) (Repealed by House of Commons Disqualification Act 1957 (5 & 6 Eliz. 2. c. 20))
Army and Air Force (Annual) Act 1931 (repealed)	21 & 22 Geo. 5. c. 14	29 April 1931
An Act to provide, during Twelve Months (and, as respects certain places outside the United Kingdom, during Fifteen Months) for the Discipline and Regulation of the Army and Air Force. (Repealed by Statute Law Revision Act 1950 (14 Geo. 6. c. 6), Statute Law Revision Act 1953 (2 & 3 Eliz. 2. c. 5) and Revision of the Army and Air Force Acts (Transitional Provisions) Act 1955 (3 & 4 Eliz. 2. c. 20))
Yarmouth Naval Hospital Act 1931 (repealed)	21 & 22 Geo. 5. c. 15	29 April 1931
An Act to provide for the reception and detention of certain persons of unsound mind in the Royal Naval Hospital at Great Yarmouth and for the treatment therein of certain voluntary patients; to prohibit the taking of legal proceedings in respect of the reception and detention of any person in the said hospital before the commencement of this Act; and for purposes connected with the matters aforesaid. (Repealed by Yarmouth Naval Hospital Transfer Act 1957 (6 & 7 Eliz. 2. c. 3))
Ancient Monuments Act 1931 (repealed)	21 & 22 Geo. 5. c. 16	11 June 1931
An Act to amend the Law relating to ancient monuments. (Repealed by Ancient Monuments and Archaeological Areas Act 1979 (c. 46))
Local Authorities (Publicity) Act 1931 (repealed)	21 & 22 Geo. 5. c. 17	11 June 1931
An Act to confer upon local authorities powers for promoting the publicity throughout the world of the amenities and advantages of the British Isles. (Repealed for England and Wales by Local Government Act 1972 (c. 70) and for Scotland by Local Government (Scotland) Act 1973 (c. 65))
Workmen's Compensation Act 1931 (repealed)	21 & 22 Geo. 5. c. 18	11 June 1931
An Act to amend subsection (4) of section nine of the Workmen's Compensation Act, 1925. (Note: Workmen's Compensation Act 1925 (15 & 16 Geo. 5. c. 84)) (Repealed by National Insurance (Industrial Injuries) Act 1946 (9 & 10 Geo. 6. c. 62))
Widows', Orphans' and Old Age Contributory Pensions Act 1931 (repealed)	21 & 22 Geo. 5. c. 19	11 June 1931
An Act to amend section one of the Widows', Orphans' and Old Age Contributory Pensions Act, 1929, (Note: Widows', Orphans' and Old Age Contributory Pensions Act 1929 (20 & 21 Geo. 5. c. 10)) so as to define for the purposes of the said section one the meaning of the expression "normal occupation," and so as to entitle to widows' pensions the widows of men who attained the age of seventy on or before the fifteenth day of July, nineteen hundred and twelve, and died on or after the fourth day of January, nineteen hundred and twenty-six, and whose normal occupation was at some time within three years before the date on which they attained the said age of a certain kind; and for purposes consequential upon the purposes aforesaid. (Repealed by Widows', Orphans' and Old Age Contributory Pensions Act 1936 (26 Geo. 5 & 1 Edw. 8. c. 33))
Post Office and Telegraph (Money) Act 1931 (repealed)	21 & 22 Geo. 5. c. 20	11 June 1931
An Act to provide for raising further money for the development of the postal, telegraphic and telephonic systems. (Repealed by Statute Law Revision Act 1958 (6 & 7 Eliz. 2. c. 46))
Palestine and East Africa Loans (Amendment) Act 1931 or the East Africa Loans (Amendment) Act 1931 (repealed)	21 & 22 Geo. 5. c. 21	11 June 1931
An Act to amend subsection (2) of section one of the Palestine and East Africa Loans Act, 1926. (Note: Palestine and East Africa Loans Act 1926 (16 & 17 Geo. 5. c. 62)) (Repealed by Statute Law (Repeals) Act 1976 (c. 16))
Housing (Rural Workers) Amendment Act 1931 (repealed)	21 & 22 Geo. 5. c. 22	8 July 1931
An Act to make provision for the extension of the time within which applications for assistance under the Housing (Rural Workers) Act, 1926, (Note: Housing (Rural Workers) Act 1926 (16 & 17 Geo. 5. c. 56)) may be received by local authorities. (Repealed by Statute Law Revision Act 1950 (14 Geo. 6. c. 6))
Mining Industry (Welfare Fund) Act 1931 (repealed)	21 & 22 Geo. 5. c. 23	8 July 1931
An Act to extend the period during which payments are to be made to the fund constituted under section twenty of the Mining Industry Act, 1920. (Note: Mining Industry Act 1920 (10 & 11 Geo. 5. c. 50)) (Repealed by Statute Law Revision Act 1950 (14 Geo. 6. c. 6))
Sentence of Death (Expectant Mothers) Act 1931 (repealed)	21 & 22 Geo. 5. c. 24	8 July 1931
An Act to prohibit the passing of the sentence of death upon expectant mothers, and for other purposes connected therewith. (Repealed by Crime and Disorder Act 1998 (c. 37))
Unemployment Insurance (No. 2) Act 1931 (repealed)	21 & 22 Geo. 5. c. 25	8 July 1931
An Act to raise to one hundred and fifteen million pounds the limit on the amount of the advances by the Treasury to the Unemployment Fund which may be outstanding during the deficiency period, to amend subsection (2) of section fourteen of the Unemployment Insurance Act, 1927, (Note: Unemployment Insurance Act 1927 (17 & 18 Geo. 5. c. 30)) by further extending to forty-eight months the period of twelve months therein mentioned, and to make provision for certain other matters in connection with the extension aforesaid. (Repealed by Unemployment Act 1934 (24 & 25 Geo. 5. c. 29))
Mauritius Loan (Guarantee) Act 1931 (repealed)	21 & 22 Geo. 5. c. 26	8 July 1931
An Act to authorise the Treasury to guarantee a loan to be raised by the Government of Mauritius, and the making of advances out of moneys provided by Parliament for the payment of the annual charges in respect of the loan for a limited period. (Repealed by Statute Law Revision Act 1959 (7 & 8 Eliz. 2. c. 68))
Coal Mines Act 1931 (repealed)	21 & 22 Geo. 5. c. 27	8 July 1931
An Act to remove for a period not exceeding one year the limitation upon the number of days on which the hours of employment below ground in coal mines may be extended under section three of the Coal Mines Regulation Act, 1908; (Note: Coal Mines Regulation Act 1908 (8 Edw. 7. c. 57)) to restrict the duration of such extensions to half an hour on any one day, and to provide for the maintenance during the period aforesaid of minimum percentage additions to basis rates of wages and of subsistence rates of wages. (Repealed by Coal Industry Act 1992 (c. 17))
Finance Act 1931	21 & 22 Geo. 5. c. 28	31 July 1931
An Act to grant certain duties of Customs and Inland Revenue (including Excise), to alter other duties, and to amend the law relating to Customs and Inland Revenue (including Excise) and the National Debt, and to make further provision in connection with finance.
Appropriation Act 1931 (repealed)	21 & 22 Geo. 5. c. 29	31 July 1931
An Act to apply a sum out of the Consolidated Fund to the service of the year ending on the thirty-first day of March, one thousand nine hundred and thirty-two, and to appropriate the Supplies granted in this Session of Parliament. (Repealed by Statute Law Revision Act 1950 (14 Geo. 6. c. 6))
Probation of Offenders (Scotland) Act 1931 (repealed)	21 & 22 Geo. 5. c. 30	31 July 1931
An Act to amend the law relating to Probation of Offenders in Scotland. (Repealed by Criminal Justice (Scotland) Act 1949 (12, 13 & 14 Geo. 6. c. 94))
Marriage (Prohibited Degrees of Relationship) Act 1931 (repealed)	21 & 22 Geo. 5. c. 31	31 July 1931
An Act to amend the Law relating to the marriage of persons with their nephew or niece by marriage. (Repealed by Marriage (Enabling) Act 1960 (8 & 9 Eliz. 2. c. 29))
Road Traffic (Amendment) Act 1931 (repealed)	21 & 22 Geo. 5. c. 32	31 July 1931
An Act to repeal subsection (3) of section sixty-one of the Road Traffic Act, 1930, (Note: Road Traffic Act 1930 (20 & 21 Geo. 5. c. 43)) and to correct an error in section one hundred of that Act. (Repealed by Road Traffic Act 1960 (8 & 9 Eliz. 2. c. 16))
Architects (Registration) Act 1931 (repealed)	21 & 22 Geo. 5. c. 33	31 July 1931
An Act to provide for the registration of architects and for purposes connected therewith. (Repealed by Architects Act 1997 (c. 22))
Isle of Man (Customs) Act 1931 (repealed)	21 & 22 Geo. 5. c. 34	31 July 1931
An Act to amend the law with respect to Customs in the Isle of Man. (Repealed by Isle of Man (Customs) (No. 2) Act 1932 (22 & 23 Geo. 5. c. 41), Statute Law Revision Act 1950 (14 Geo. 6. c. 6), Isle of Man (Customs) Act 1950 (14 Geo. 6. c. 19) and Statute Law Revision Act 1953 (2 & 3 Eliz. 2. c. 5))
British Sugar Industry (Assistance) Act 1931 (repealed)	21 & 22 Geo. 5. c. 35	31 July 1931
An Act to provide for the making of advances to certain companies in respect of sugar manufactured by them in Great Britain during a period of one year beginning on the first day of October, nineteen hundred and thirty-one, from beet grown in Great Britain; to provide for the recovery in certain events of the whole or some part of the advances so made, and for the remission of any balance thereof not so recovered; and for purposes incidental to, or consequential upon, the matters aforesaid. (Repealed by Statute Law Revision Act 1950 (14 Geo. 6. c. 6))
Unemployment Insurance (No. 3) Act 1931 (repealed)	21 & 22 Geo. 5. c. 36	31 July 1931
An Act to provide for the amendment, in relation to certain classes of persons, of the enactments relating to unemployment insurance with a view to the elimination of anomalies in the operation of those enactments, and to provide for facilitating the removal of workers and their dependants from one place to another. (Repealed by Unemployment Insurance Act 1935 (25 & 26 Geo. 5. c. 8))
Adoption of Children (Scotland) Act 1931 (repealed)	21 & 22 Geo. 5. c. 37	31 July 1931
An Act to amend the Adoption of Children (Scotland) Act, 1930, (Note: Adoption of Children (Scotland) Act 1930 (20 & 21 Geo. 5. c. 37)) with respect to the effect of adoptions under that Act for the purposes of the Widows', Orphans' and Old Age Contributory Pensions Acts, 1925 (Note: Widows', Orphans' and Old Age Contributory Pensions Act 1925 (15 & 16 Geo. 5. c. 70)) and 1929. (Repealed by Widows', Orphans' and Old Age Contributory Pensions Act 1936 (26 Geo. 5 & 1 Edw. 8. c. 33))
Isle of Man Loans Act 1931 (repealed)	21 & 22 Geo. 5. c. 38	31 July 1931
An Act to extend the purposes for which the Government of the Isle of Man may borrow under and in accordance with the Isle of Man Loans Act, 1880. (Note: Isle of Man Loans Act 1880 (43 & 44 Vict. c. 8)) (Repealed by Isle of Man Act 1958 (6 & 7 Eliz. 2. c. 11))
Housing (Rural Authorities) Act 1931 (repealed)	21 & 22 Geo. 5. c. 39	31 July 1931
An Act to enable further assistance to be given to rural housing authorities in regard to the provision of houses in agricultural parishes in England and in rural areas in Scotland for agricultural workers and for persons whose economic condition is substantially the same as that of such workers, and in connection therewith to amend the provisions of section three of the Housing (Financial Provisions) Act, 1924, (Note: Housing (Financial Provisions) Act 1924 (14 & 15 Geo. 5. c. 35)) with respect to the rents of such houses. (Repealed for Scotland by Housing (Financial Provisions) (Scotland) Act 1972 (c. 46) and for England and Wales by Statute Law (Repeals) Act 1981 (c. 19))
Agricultural Produce (Grading and Marking) Amendment Act 1931 (repealed)	21 & 22 Geo. 5. c. 40	31 July 1931
An Act to amend the Agricultural Produce (Grading and Marking) Act, 1928. (Note: Agricultural Produce (Grading and Marking) Act 1928 (18 & 19 Geo. 5. c. 19)) (Repealed by Deregulation Act 2015 (c. 20))
Agricultural Land (Utilisation) Act 1931	21 & 22 Geo. 5. c. 41	31 July 1931
An Act to promote the better utilisation of agricultural land in Great Britain and the settlement of unemployed persons thereon, to amend the law relating to small holdings and allotments, and for purposes connected with the matters aforesaid.
Agricultural Marketing Act 1931 (repealed)	21 & 22 Geo. 5. c. 42	31 July 1931
An Act to enable schemes to be made for regulating the marketing of agricultural products; to confer powers upon boards and other bodies to be constituted in connection with, or acting for purposes connected with, such schemes; to establish agricultural marketing funds for the purpose of making loans thereout to the boards aforesaid; to encourage agricultural co-operation, research and education; and to provide for purposes connected with the matters aforesaid. (Repealed by Agricultural Marketing Act 1958 (6 & 7 Eliz. 2. c. 47))
Improvement of Live Stock (Licensing of Bulls) Act 1931 (repealed)	21 & 22 Geo. 5. c. 43	31 July 1931
An Act to provide for the improvement of live stock by regulating the keeping and importation of bulls and for purposes connected with the matters aforesaid. (Repealed by Animal Health and Welfare Act 1984 (c. 40))
Small Landholders and Agricultural Holdings (Scotland) Act 1931	21 & 22 Geo. 5. c. 44	31 July 1931
An Act to amend the Small Landholders (Scotland) Acts, 1886 to 1919, and the Agricultural Holdings (Scotland) Act, 1923. (Note: Agricultural Holdings (Scotland) Act 1923 (13 & 14 Geo. 5. c. 10))
Local Government (Clerks) Act 1931 (repealed)	21 & 22 Geo. 5. c. 45	31 July 1931
An Act to amend the law relating to the offices of clerk of the county council and clerk of the peace of counties and to persons holding those offices, and for purposes connected with the matters aforesaid. (Repealed by Courts Act 1971 (c. 23))
Gold Standard (Amendment) Act 1931 (repealed)	21 & 22 Geo. 5. c. 46	21 September 1931
An Act to suspend the operation of subsection (2) of section one of the Gold Standard Act, 1925, (Note: Gold Standard Act 1925 (15 & 16 Geo. 5. c. 29)) and for purposes connected therewith. (Repealed by Statute Law (Repeals) Act 1986 (c. 12))
Public Works Loans Act 1931 (repealed)	21 & 22 Geo. 5. c. 47	30 September 1931
An Act to grant money for the purpose of certain local loans out of the Local Loans Fund and for other purposes relating to local loans. (Repealed by Statute Law Revision Act 1950 (14 Geo. 6. c. 6))
National Economy Act 1931 (repealed)	21 & 22 Geo. 5. c. 48	30 September 1931
An Act to authorise the making of Orders in Council for the purpose of effecting economies in expenditure falling to be defrayed out of public moneys and improvements in the arrangements for meeting such expenditure. (Repealed by Statute Law (Repeals) Act 1971 (c. 52))
Finance (No. 2) Act 1931	21 & 22 Geo. 5. c. 49	5 October 1931
An Act to increase the Customs and Excise duties on beer and tobacco, the Customs duty on hydrocarbon oils, and the entertainments duty; to increase the standard rate of income tax for the year 1931-32, and the higher rates of income tax for the year 1930-31; to amend the Income Tax Acts in so far as they relate to certain reliefs and the tax payable by persons carrying on a trade consisting wholly or partly in dealing in securities; to amend section thirty-six of the Finance Act, 1931, (Note: Finance Act 1931 (21 & 22 Geo. 5. c. 28)) and the law relating to the National Debt; and to make provision for certain matters connected with the matters aforesaid.
Appropriation (No. 2) Act 1931 (repealed)	21 & 22 Geo. 5. c. 50	7 October 1931
An Act to apply a sum out of the Consolidated Fund to the service of the year ending on the thirty-first day of March, one thousand nine hundred and thirty-two, and to appropriate the further Supplies granted in this Session of Parliament. (Repealed by Statute Law Revision Act 1950 (14 Geo. 6. c. 6))
Foodstuffs (Prevention of Exploitation) Act 1931 (repealed)	21 & 22 Geo. 5. c. 51	7 October 1931
An Act to authorise the Board of Trade, in case of need, to take exceptional measures for preventing or remedying shortages in, or unreasonable increases in the price of certain articles of food or drink. (Repealed by Statute Law Revision Act 1950 (14 Geo. 6. c. 6))
Sunday Performances (Temporary Regulation) Act 1931 (repealed)	21 & 22 Geo. 5. c. 52	7 October 1931
An Act to enable the existing practice as to cinematograph and musical entertainments on Sundays to be continued temporarily and to make temporary provision as to the enforcement of the enactments relating to Sunday observance. (Repealed by Sunday Entertainments Act 1932 (22 & 23 Geo. 5. c. 51))

=== Local acts ===
Short title	Citation	Royal assent
Long title
Provisional Orders (Marriages) Confirmation Act 1931 (repealed)	21 & 22 Geo. 5. c. vii	3 March 1931
An Act to confirm certain Provisional Orders made by one of His Majesty's Principal Secretaries of State under the Marriages Validity (Provisional Orders) Acts 1905 (Note: Provisional Order (Marriages) Act 1905 (5 Edw. 7. c. 23)) and 1924 (Note: Marriages Validity (Provisional Orders) Act 1924 (14 & 15 Geo. 5. c. 20)) relating to Saint Mark Londonderry Saint Mary Shirehampton Saint Mary Virgin Henbury Saint Andrew Avonmouth Saint Edyth Sea Mills All Saints Falsgrave. (Repealed by Statute Law (Repeals) Act 1977 (c. 18))
	Saint Mark Londonderry Order.	
	Saint Mary Shirehamрton Saint Mary Virgin Henbury Saint Andrew Avonmouth and Saint Edyth Sea Mills Order.	
	All Saints Falsgrave Order.	
Public Works Facilities Scheme (Wick Harbour) Confirmation Act 1931	21 & 22 Geo. 5. c. viii	27 March 1931
An Act to confirm a Scheme under the Public Works Facilities Act 1930 (Note: Public Works Facilities Act 1930 (20 & 21 Geo. 5. c. 50)) relating to Wick Harbour.
	Wick Harbour Scheme 1931 Scheme to authorise the Wick Harbour Trustees to construct works and for other purposes.	
Ministry of Health Provisional Orders Confirmation (Gloucestershire, Warwickshire and Worcestershire) Act 1931 (repealed)	21 & 22 Geo. 5. c. ix	27 March 1931
An Act to confirm certain Provisional Orders of the Minister of Health relating to the Counties of Gloucester Warwick and Worcester. (Repealed by Statute Law (Repeals) Act 1995 (c. 44))
	Worcestershire to Gloucestershire Transfer Order 1931 Provisional Order made in pursuance of the Local Government Act 1888 (Note: Local Government Act 1888 (51 & 52 Vict. c. 41)) for altering county boundaries.	
	Gloucestershire and Worcestershire to Warwickshire Transfer Order 1931 Provisional Order made in pursuance of the Local Government Act 1888 for altering county boundaries.	
	Gloucestershire and Warwickshire to Worcestershire Transfer Order 1931 Provisional Order made in pursuance of the Local Government Act 1888 for altering county boundaries.	
Calder and Hebble Navigation Act 1931	21 & 22 Geo. 5. c. x	27 March 1931
An Act to confer further powers on the Company of Proprietors of the Calder and Hebble Navigation and for other purposes.
New Junction Canal Act 1931	21 & 22 Geo. 5. c. xi	27 March 1931
An Act to make further provision as to the tolls and charges applicable to the New Junction Canal.
Walthamstow Corporation Act 1931	21 & 22 Geo. 5. c. xii	27 March 1931
An Act to make provision with regard to the audit of the accounts of the mayor aldermen and burgesses of the borough of Walthamstow and their officers and for other purposes.
Preston Corporation Act 1931	21 & 22 Geo. 5. c. xiii	27 March 1931
An Act to confer further powers upon the Corporation of Preston with reference to the Ribble Navigation and to make further provision with reference to their tramway and water undertakings and the finance of the borough and for other purposes.
City of London (Various Powers) Act 1931	21 & 22 Geo. 5. c. xiv	27 March 1931
An Act to establish a new superannuation fund for the officers and servants of the Corporation of London by the amalgamation of the superannuation and pension funds established under the City of London (Various Powers) Act 1912 (Note: City of London (Various Powers) Act 1912 (2 & 3 Geo. 5. c. xlii)) to extend the powers of the Corporation with respect to the Metropolitan Cattle Market and for other purposes.
London Assurance Act 1931	21 & 22 Geo. 5. c. xv	29 April 1931
An Act to confer further powers upon the London Assurance.
Birmingham Canal Navigations Act 1931	21 & 22 Geo. 5. c. xvi	29 April 1931
An Act to make further provision as to the tolls dues and charges leviable by the Company of Proprietors of the Birmingham Canal Navigations as to the holding of general assemblies and for other purposes.
Gillingham Corporation Act 1931 (repealed)	21 & 22 Geo. 5. c. xvii	29 April 1931
An Act to confer further powers upon the mayor aldermen and burgesses of the borough of Gillingham with regard to their electricity undertaking to make further and better provision for the improvement health local government and finance of the borough and for other purposes. (Repealed by County of Kent Act 1981 (c. xviii))
Carnegie Hero Fund Trust Act 1931	21 & 22 Geo. 5. c. xviii	29 April 1931
An Act to amend the provisions of the trust deed creating the Carnegie Hero Fund Trust and for other purposes.
Public Works Facilities Scheme (Inverness Harbour) Confirmation Act 1931	21 & 22 Geo. 5. c. xix	29 April 1931
An Act to confirm a Scheme made by the Minister of Transport under the Public Works Facilities Act 1930 relating to Inverness Harbour.
	Inverness Harbour Scheme 1931 Scheme to authorise the Trustees of the harbour of Inverness to construct works to borrow money and for other purposes.	
London, Midland and Scottish Railway Order Confirmation Act 1931	21 & 22 Geo. 5. c. xx	29 April 1931
An Act to confirm a Provisional Order under the Private Legislation Procedure (Scotland) Act 1899 (Note: Private Legislation Procedure (Scotland) Act 1899 (62 & 63 Vict. c. 47)) relating to the London Midland and Scottish Railway.
	London, Midland and Scottish Railway Order 1931 Provisional Order to authorise the London Midland and Scottish Railway Company to acquire lands in Scotland to extend the time for the completion of certain authorised works and for the purchase of lands and for other purposes.	
Cumberland Market (St. Pancras) Act 1931	21 & 22 Geo. 5. c. xxi	11 June 1931
An Act to repeal the Act of the eleventh year of His late Majesty King George IV. chapter fourteen (Note: Markets in Saint Pancras Parish, Middlesex Act 1830 (11 Geo. 4 & 1 Will. 4. c. 14)) (which provided for the establishment of a market in the parish of Saint Pancras) to provide for the appropriation as open ground of other land in substitution for any part of the site of that market on which it is proposed to erect buildings and for purposes connected with the purposes aforesaid.
Public Works Facilities Scheme (West Surrey Water) Confirmation Act 1931	21 & 22 Geo. 5. c. xxii	11 June 1931
An Act to confirm a Scheme made by the Minister of Transport under the Public Works Facilities Act 1930 relating to the West Surrey Water Company.
	West Surrey Water Scheme 1931 Scheme under the Public Works Facilities Act 1930 empowering the West Surrey Water Company to construct waterworks and for other purposes.	
Public Works Facilities Scheme (Acton Swing Bridge) Confirmation Act 1931	21 & 22 Geo. 5. c. xxiii	11 June 1931
An Act to confirm a Scheme made by the Minister of Transport under the Public Works Facilities Act 1930 relating to the Weaver Navigation Trustees and the Cheshire County Council.
	Acton Swing Bridge Scheme 1931 Scheme under the Public Works Facilities Act 1930 empowering the Weaver Navigation Trustees and the Cheshire County Council to construct works and for other purposes.	
Ministry of Health Provisional Order Confirmation (East Elloe Joint Water Supply District) Act 1931 (repealed)	21 & 22 Geo. 5. c. xxiv	11 June 1931
An Act to confirm a Provisional Order of the Minister of Health relating to the East Elloe Joint Water Supply District. (Repealed by Parts of Holland (Alteration of Districts and Parishes) Order 1932 (SR&O 1932/183))
	East Elloe Joint Water Order 1931 Provisional Order forming a united district under section 279 of the Public Health Act 1875. (Note: Public Health Act 1875 (38 & 39 Vict. c. 55))	
Alexander Scott's Hospital Order Confirmation Act 1931	21 & 22 Geo. 5. c. xxv	11 June 1931
An Act to confirm a Provisional Order under the Private Legislation Procedure (Scotland) Act 1899 relating to Alexander Scott's Hospital.
	Alexander Scott's Hospital Order 1931 Provisional Order to extend the qualifications for the admission of inmates to Alexander Scott's Hospital to confirm an agreement with the managing committee of the Huntly Jubilee Cottage Hospital and for other purposes.	
Scottish United Investors Limited Order Confirmation Act 1931 (repealed)	21 & 22 Geo. 5. c. xxvi	11 June 1931
An Act to confirm a Provisional Order under the Private Legislation Procedure (Scotland) Act 1899 relating to Scottish United Investors Limited. (Repealed by Statute Law (Repeals) Act 2004 (c. 14))
	Scottish United Investors Limited Order 1931 Provisional Order to sanction and confirm the issue by the Scottish United Investors Limited of preference stock ranking pari passu with their original preference stock and for other purposes.	
Lowestoft Water and Gas Act 1931	21 & 22 Geo. 5. c. xxvii	11 June 1931
An Act to confer further powers upon the Lowestoft Water and Gas Company to extend their limits for the supply of gas to convert the preference stocks of the Company and for other purposes.
Guildford Gas and Cranleigh Electricity Act 1931	21 & 22 Geo. 5. c. xxviii	11 June 1931
An Act to provide for the transfer to the Guildford Gas Light and Coke Company of the undertaking of the Cranleigh Gas and Electricity Company Limited to confer powers on the Guildford Gas Light and Coke Company to supply electricity and further powers in relation to their gas undertaking and for other purposes.
Northampton Extension Act 1931 (repealed)	21 & 22 Geo. 5. c. xxix	11 June 1931
An Act to extend the boundaries of the borough of Northampton and for other purposes. (Repealed by Northampton Act 1988 (c. xxix))
Mid-Southern District Utility Act 1931	21 & 22 Geo. 5. c. xxx	11 June 1931
An Act to extend the limits of the Aldershot Gas Water and District Lighting Company for the supply of gas to change the name of the Company and for other purposes.
Liverpool University Act 1931	21 & 22 Geo. 5. c. xxxi	11 June 1931
An Act to empower the University of Liverpool to consolidate the investments representing the endowments of the University and for other purposes.
Middlesex County Council Act 1931 (repealed)	21 & 22 Geo. 5. c. xxxii	11 June 1931
An Act to make further provision for the disposal of sewage in the county of Middlesex to confer further powers upon the Council of that county and the local authorities therein and for other purposes. (Repealed by Middlesex County Council Act 1944 (7 & 8 Geo. 6. c. xxi))
London Electric, Metropolitan District and City and South London Railway Companies Act 1931	21 & 22 Geo. 5. c. xxxiii	11 June 1931
An Act to empower the London Electric Railway Company to construct subways deviations of railways and works to empower the Metropolitan District Railway Company to construct works to empower the City and South London Railway Company to construct a subway to empower the London Electric Railway Company and the City and South London Railway Company to construct subways and works and to confer further powers on the said and other companies and for other purposes.
Ministry of Health Provisional Order Confirmation (City of Worcester) Act 1931 (repealed)	21 & 22 Geo. 5. c. xxxiv	8 July 1931
An Act to confirm a Provisional Order of the Minister of Health relating to the City of Worcester. (Repealed by Worcester City Council Act 1985 (c. xliii))
	City of Worcester (Extension) Order 1931 Provisional Order made in pursuance of the Local Government Act 1888 for the extension of a County Borough.	
Ministry of Health Provisional Orders Confirmation (Manchester and South Staffordshire Joint Smallpox Hospital District) Act 1931	21 & 22 Geo. 5. c. xxxv	8 July 1931
An Act to confirm certain Provisional Orders of the Minister of Health relating to Manchester and the South Staffordshire Joint Small-pox Hospital District.
	Manchester Order 1931 Provisional Order for partially repealing and amending the Manchester Market Act 1846. (Note: Manchester Market Act 1846 (9 & 10 Vict. c. ccxix))	
	South Staffordshire Joint Small-pox Hospital Order 1931 Provisional Order altering certain confirming Acts.	
Ministry of Health Provisional Orders Confirmation (Accrington and Leicester) Act 1931	21 & 22 Geo. 5. c. xxxvi	8 July 1931
An Act to confirm certain Provisional Orders of the Minister of Health relating to Accrington and Leicester.
	Accrington Order 1931 Provisional Order amending the Accrington Corporation Act 1928. (Note: Accrington Corporation Act 1928 (18 & 19 Geo. 5. c. xcv))	
	Leicester Order 1931 Provisional Order to enable the Leicester Corporation to put in force the compulsory clauses of the Lands Clauses Acts.	
Ministry of Health Provisional Orders Confirmation (Herne Bay Water and Southend Water) Act 1931	21 & 22 Geo. 5. c. xxxvii	8 July 1931
An Act to confirm certain Provisional Orders of the Minister of Health relating to Herne Bay Water and Southend Water.
	Herne Bay Water Order 1931 Provisional Order under the Gas and Water Works Facilities Act 1870 (Note: Gas and Water Works Facilities Act 1870 (33 & 34 Vict. c. 70)) and the Gas and Water Works Facilities Act 1870 Amendment Act 1873 (Note: Gas and Water Works Facilities Act 1870 Amendment Act 1873 (36 & 37 Vict. c. 89)) empowering the Herne Bay Waterworks Company to raise additional capital and for other purposes.	
	Southend Water Order 1931 Provisional Order under the Gas and Water Works Facilities Act 1870 and the Gas and Water Works Facilities Act 1870 Amendment Act 1873 empowering the Southend Waterworks Company to raise additional capital and for other purposes.	
Ministry of Health Provisional Orders Confirmation (Aylesbury Joint Hospital District and Stretford and District Gas Board) Act 1931	21 & 22 Geo. 5. c. xxxviii	8 July 1931
An Act to confirm certain Provisional Orders of the Minister of Health relating to Aylesbury Joint Hospital District and the Stretford and District Gas Board.
	Aylesbury Joint Hospital Order 1931 Provisional Order forming a united district under section 279 of the Public Health Act 1875.	
	Stretford and District Gas Board Order 1931 Provisional Order for altering a Local Act. (Note: Stretford and District Gas Board Act 1922 (12 & 13 Geo. 5. c. liii))	
Ministry of Health Provisional Orders Confirmation (Birkenhead and Chepping Wycombe) Act 1931	21 & 22 Geo. 5. c. xxxix	8 July 1931
An Act to confirm certain Provisional Orders of the Minister of Health relating to Birkenhead and Chepping Wycombe.
	Birkenhead Order 1931 Provisional Order amending certain local Acts.	
	Chepping Wycombe (Acquisition of Land) Order 1931 Provisional Order to enable the Chepping Wycombe Corporation to put in force the compulsory clauses of the Lands Clauses Acts.	
Ministry of Health Provisional Orders Confirmation (Frimley and Farnborough Water and Great Berkhamstead Water) Act 1931	21 & 22 Geo. 5. c. xl	8 July 1931
An Act to confirm certain Provisional Orders of the Minister of Health relating to Frimley and Farnborough Water and Great Berkhampstead Water.
	Frimley and Farnborough District Water Order 1931 Provisional Order under the Gas and Water Works Facilities Act 1870 and the Gas and Water Works Facilities Act 1870 Amendment Act 1873 empowering the Frimley and Farnborough District Water Company to raise additional capital and for other purposes.	
	Great Berkhamstead Water Order 1931 rovisional Order under the Gas and Water Works Facilities Act 1870 and the Gas and Water Works Facilities Act 1870 Amendment Act 1873 increasing the borrowing powers of the Great Berkhampstead Waterworks Company conferring further powers upon that Company and for other purposes.	
Kincardine-on-Forth Bridge Order Confirmation Act 1931	21 & 22 Geo. 5. c. xli	8 July 1931
An Act to confirm a Provisional Order under the Private Legislation Procedure (Scotland) Act, 1899, relating to Kincardine-on-Forth Bridge.
	Kincardine-on-Forth Bridge Order 1931	
Wallasey Corporation (Trolley Vehicles) Order Confirmation Act 1931 (repealed)	21 & 22 Geo. 5. c. xlii	8 July 1931
An Act to confirm a Provisional Order made by the Minister of Transport under the Wallasey Corporation Act 1927 (Note: Wallasey Corporation Act 1927 (17 & 18 Geo. 5. c. cxxii)) relating to Wallasey Corporation trolley vehicles. (Repealed by County of Merseyside Act 1980 (c. x))
	Wallasey Corporation (Trolley Vehicles) Order 1931 Provisional Order authorising the mayor aldermen and burgesses of the borough of Wallasey to provide maintain and use trolley vehicles upon certain routes in the borough of Wallasey.	
Portsmouth Corporation Act 1931	21 & 22 Geo. 5. c. xliii	8 July 1931
An Act to empower the corporation of Portsmouth to execute street improvements to make better provision for the health local government and finance of the city and for other purposes.
Southern Railway Act 1931	21 & 22 Geo. 5. c. xliv	8 July 1931
An Act to empower the Southern Railway Company to construct works and acquire lands to extend the time for the completion of certain railways and for other purposes.
Tamworth Corporation Act 1931 (repealed)	21 & 22 Geo. 5. c. xlv	8 July 1931
An Act to extend the boundaries of the borough of Tamworth to make further and better provision for the improvement health local government and finance of the borough and for other purposes. (Repealed by Staffordshire Act 1983 (c. xviii))
Epsom Urban District Council Act 1931	21 & 22 Geo. 5. c. xlvi	8 July 1931
An Act to confer further powers on the Epsom Urban District Council in regard to their water and electricity undertakings and for other purposes.
Trowbridge, Melksham and District Water Board Act 1931	21 & 22 Geo. 5. c. xlvii	8 July 1931
An Act to constitute and incorporate a joint board consisting of representatives of the urban district councils of Trowbridge and Melksham and the rural district councils of Melksham and Westbury and Whorwellsdown to transfer to and vest in the Board the undertaking of the Trowbridge Water Company to authorise the Board to supply water and for other purposes.
Gas Light and Coke Company's Act 1931	21 & 22 Geo. 5. c. xlviii	8 July 1931
An Act to provide for the transfer to the Gas Light and Coke Company of the undertakings of the Southend-on-Sea and District Gas Company and the Brentwood Gas Company to confer various powers upon the Gas Light and Coke Company and for other purposes.
London, Midland and Scottish Railway Act 1931	21 & 22 Geo. 5. c. xlix	8 July 1931
An Act to empower the London Midland and Scottish Railway Company to construct works and to acquire lands and for other purposes.
Ventnor Urban District Council Act 1931	21 & 22 Geo. 5. c. l	8 July 1931
An Act to provide for the transfer of the water undertaking of the Ventnor Gas and Water Company to the urban district council of Ventnor to authorise the Council to supply water in and in the neighbourhood of their district and for other purposes.
Hackney Borough Council Act 1931	21 & 22 Geo. 5. c. li	8 July 1931
An Act to empower the mayor aldermen and councillors of the metropolitan borough of Hackney to acquire lands for the extension of their town hall to amend the provisions relating to the granting of superannuation allowances to their officers and servants and for other purposes.
London County Council (Money) Act 1931 (repealed)	21 & 22 Geo. 5. c. lii	8 July 1931
An Act to regulate the expenditure on capital account and lending of money by the London County Council during the financial period from the first day of April one thousand nine hundred and thirty-one to the thirtieth day of September one thousand nine hundred and thirty-two and for other purposes. (Repealed by London County Council (Loans) Act 1955 (4 & 5 Eliz. 2. c. xxvi))
Rotherham Rural District Council Act 1931 (repealed)	21 & 22 Geo. 5. c. liii	8 July 1931
An Act to confer further powers upon the rural district council of Rotherham for the regulation and control of the development of building estates and the laying out of new streets and in regard to buildings sewers and drains and for other purposes. (Repealed by Statute Law (Repeals) Act 1989 (c. 43))
Royston and Brodsworth Gas Act 1931	21 & 22 Geo. 5. c. liv	8 July 1931
An Act to provide for amalgamation of the undertakings of the Brodsworth and District Gas Company the South Elmsall and District Gas Company and the Royston (Yorks) and District Gas Company Limited to incorporate and confer powers on the Royston and Brodsworth Gas Company and vest in that company the amalgamated undertakings and for other purposes.
London County Council (Vauxhall Cross Improvement) Act 1931	21 & 22 Geo. 5. c. lv	8 July 1931
An Act to empower the London County Council to make new streets and street improvements at and near Vauxhall Cross in the metropolitan borough of Lambeth and to construct and work new tramways in connection therewith and for other purposes.
Coventry Extension Act 1931 (repealed)	21 & 22 Geo. 5. c. lvi	8 July 1931
An Act to extend the boundaries of the city of Coventry and for purposes incidental thereto. (Repealed by West Midlands County Council Act 1980 (c. xi))
Doncaster Corporation Act 1931	21 & 22 Geo. 5. c. lvii	8 July 1931
An Act to empower the corporation of Doncaster to construct additional waterworks to establish an aerodrome undertaking and to provide and work trolley vehicles to confer further powers upon them with respect to their water light railways gas and electricity undertakings to make better provision for the health local government and finance of the borough and for other purposes.
Romford Urban District Council Act 1931	21 & 22 Geo. 5. c. lviii	8 July 1931
An Act to make further and better provision for the improvement health and local government of the urban district of Romford and for other purposes.
London County Council (General Powers) Act 1931	21 & 22 Geo. 5. c. lix	8 July 1931
An Act to confer further powers upon the London County Council and other authorities and for other purposes.
West Ham Corporation Act 1931	21 & 22 Geo. 5. c. lx	8 July 1931
An Act to authorise the mayor aldermen and burgesses of the county borough of West Ham to acquire lands for various purposes to make further provisions with reference to their electricity undertaking and for other purposes.
Great Western Railway Act 1931	21 & 22 Geo. 5. c. lxi	8 July 1931
An Act for conferring further powers upon the Great Western Railway Company and for other purposes.
Yorkshire (Woollen District) Transport Act 1931 (repealed)	21 & 22 Geo. 5. c. lxii	8 July 1931
An Act to make provision as to the abandonment of the tramways and light railways owned or worked by the Yorkshire (Woollen District) Electric Tramways Limited to provide for the running of public service vehicles in substitution therefor and for other purposes. (Repealed by Yorkshire Woollen District Transport Act 1980 (c. xxv))
Bethlem Hospital (Amendment) Act 1931	21 & 22 Geo. 5. c. lxiii	31 July 1931
An Act to confirm certain agreements entered into by the Commissioners of Works with a view to the acquisition for the purposes of the Imperial War Museum of a part of the premises vested by the Bethlem Hospital Act 1926 (Note: Bethlem Hospital Act 1926 (16 & 17 Geo. 5. c. xlviii)) in the London County Council as an open space and to authorise the retention and adaption of certain of the existing buildings on the said premises and for purposes consequential thereon.
North Killingholme (Admiralty Pier) Act 1931	21 & 22 Geo. 5. c. lxiv	31 July 1931
An Act to authorise the Admiralty to construct and maintain certain works in connection with the pier constructed by them under the North Killingholme (Admiralty Pier) Act 1912 (Note: North Killingholme (Admiralty Pier) Act 1912 (2 & 3 Geo. 5. c. clx)) and for purposes connected with the matters aforesaid.
Public Works Facilities Scheme (Great Western Railway) (No. 1) Confirmation Act 1931	21 & 22 Geo. 5. c. lxv	31 July 1931
An Act to confirm a Scheme made by the Minister of Transport under the Public Works Facilities Act 1930 relating to the Great Western Railway Company.
	Great Western Railway Scheme (No. 1) 1931 Scheme under the Public Works Facilities Act 1930 authorising the Great Western Railway Company to construct a widening of their main line of railway at Challow in the County of Berks and for other purposes.	
Public Works Facilities Scheme (Great Western Railway) (No. 2) Confirmation Act 1931	21 & 22 Geo. 5. c. lxvi	31 July 1931
An Act to confirm a Scheme made by the Minister of Transport under the Public Works Facilities Act 1930 relating to the Great Western Railway Company.
	Great Western Railway Scheme (No. 2) 1931 Scheme under the Public Works Facilities Act 1930 authorising the Great Western Railway Company to construct a widening of their Bristol and South Wales Union Railway between Filton Junction and Stapleton Road in the county of Gloucester and for other purposes.	
Public Works Facilities Scheme (Nottingham Corporation) Confirmation Act 1931	21 & 22 Geo. 5. c. lxvii	31 July 1931
An Act to confirm a Scheme made by the Minister of Health under the Public Works Facilities Act 1930 relating to the Nottingham Corporation.
	Nottingham Corporation (Waterworks) Scheme 1931 Scheme under the Public Works Facilities Act 1930 empowering the Nottingham Corporation to construct waterworks and for other purposes.	
Public Works Facilities Scheme (Newport (Mon.) Corporation) Confirmation Act 1931	21 & 22 Geo. 5. c. lxviii	31 July 1931
An Act to confirm a Scheme made by the Minister of Health under the Public Works Facilities Act 1930 relating to the Newport (Mon.) Corporation.
	Newport Corporation Scheme 1931 Scheme under the Public Works Facilities Act 1930 empowering the mayor aldermen and burgesses of the county borough of Newport to construct waterworks and for other purposes.	
Public Works Facilities Scheme (Chepping Wycombe Corporation) Confirmation Act 1931 (repealed)	21 & 22 Geo. 5. c. lxix	31 July 1931
An Act to confirm a Scheme made by the Minister of Health under the Public Works Facilities Act 1930 and relating to the Chepping Wycombe Corporation. (Repealed by Bucks Water Board Act 1959 (7 & 8 Eliz. 2. c. xxxii))
	Chepping Wycombe Corporation Scheme 1931 Scheme under the Public Works Facilities Act 1930 empowering the mayor aldermen and burgesses of the borough of Chepping Wycombe to construct waterworks and for other purposes.	
Public Works Facilities Scheme (Rothesay Water) Confirmation Act 1931	21 & 22 Geo. 5. c. lxx	31 July 1931
An Act to confirm a Scheme under the Public Works Facilities Act 1930 relating to Rothesay Water.
	Rothesay Water Scheme 1931 Scheme to authorise the town council of Rothesay to exеcute works and for other purposes.	
Public Works Facilities Scheme (Padstow Harbour) Confirmation Act 1931	21 & 22 Geo. 5. c. lxxi	31 July 1931
An Act to confirm a Scheme made by the Minister of Transport under the Public Works Facilities Act 1930 relating to the Padstow Harbour Commissioners.
	Padstow Harbour Scheme 1931 Scheme under the Public Works Facilities Act 1930 authorising the Padstow Harbour Commissioners to construct works to borrow money and for other purposes.	
Public Works Facilities Scheme (Rotherham Corporation) Confirmation Act 1931 (repealed)	21 & 22 Geo. 5. c. lxxii	31 July 1931
An Act to confirm a Scheme made by the Minister of Health under the Public Works Facilities Act 1930 relating to the Rotherham Corporation. (Repealed by Statute Law (Repeals) Act 1989 (c. 43))
	Rotherham Corporation Scheme 1931 Scheme under the Public Works Facilities Act 1930 empowering the mayor aldermen and burgesses of the county borough of Rotherham to construct street and other works and for other purposes.	
Public Works Facilities Scheme (Swindon Corporation) Confirmation Act 1931	21 & 22 Geo. 5. c. lxxiii	31 July 1931
An Act to confirm a Scheme made by the Minister of Health under the Public Works Facilities Act 1930 relating to the Swindon Corporation.
	Swindon Corporation (Waterworks) Scheme 1931 Scheme under the Public Works Facilities Act 1930 empowering the mayor aldermen and burgesses of the borough of Swindon to construct waterworks and for other purposes.	
Ministry of Health Provisional Order Confirmation (Wareham Extension) Act 1931	21 & 22 Geo. 5. c. lxxiv	31 July 1931
An Act to confirm a Provisional Order of the Minister of Health relating to the borough of Wareham.
	Wareham (Extension) Order 1931 Provisional Order extending a borough.	
Ministry of Health Provisional Order Confirmation (Great Marlow Water) Act 1931	21 & 22 Geo. 5. c. lxxv	31 July 1931
An Act to confirm a Provisional Order of the Minister of Health relating to Great Marlow Water.
	Great Marlow Order 1931 Provisional Order under the Gas and Water Works Facilities Act 1870 and the Gas and Water Works Facilities Act 1870 Amendment Act 1873 empowering the Great Marlow Water Company Limited to construct additional waterworks to extend the limits of supply of the Company to raise additional capital and for other purposes.	
Ministry of Health Provisional Order Confirmation (Yeadon Water) Act 1931 (repealed)	21 & 22 Geo. 5. c. lxxvi	31 July 1931
An Act to confirm a Provisional Order of the Minister of Health relating to Yeadon Water. (Repealed by West Yorkshire Act 1980 (c. xiv))
	Yeadon Waterworks Order 1931 Provisional Order under the Gas and Water Works Facilities Act 1870 and the Gas and Water Works Facilities Act 1870 Amendment Act 1873 empowering the Yeadon Waterworks Company to increase their borrowing powers and for other purposes.	
Ministry of Health Provisional Order Confirmation (Rhymney Valley Joint Sewerage District) Act 1931	21 & 22 Geo. 5. c. lxxvii	31 July 1931
An Act to confirm a Provisional Order of the Minister of Health relating to the Rhymney Valley Joint Sewerage District.
	Rhymney Valley Order 1931 Provisional Order partly repealing and altering a local Act, (Note: Rhymney Valley Sewerage Board Act 1912 (2 & 3 Geo. 5. c. lxxxviii)) and provisional order.	
Ministry of Health Provisional Order Confirmation (Portslade and Southwick Outfall Sewerage District and Seaton Burn Valley Joint Sewerage District) Act 1931	21 & 22 Geo. 5. c. lxxviii	31 July 1931
An Act to confirm certain Provisional Orders of the Minister of Health relating to the Portslade and Southwick Outfall Sewerage District and Seaton Burn Valley Joint Sewerage District.
	Portslade and Southwick Outfall Sewerage Order 1931 Provisional Order amending a confirmation Act. (Note: Local Government Board's Provisional Orders Confirmation (No. 9) Act 1899 (62 & 63 Vict. c. cxlvii))	
	Seaton Burn Valley Joint Sewerage Order 1931 Provisional Order altering a confirming Act. (Note: Ministry of Health Provisional Orders Confirmation (No. 12) Act 1927 (17 & 18 Geo. 5. c. xl))	
Ministry of Health Provisional Orders Confirmation (St. Helens and York) Act 1931	21 & 22 Geo. 5. c. lxxix	31 July 1931
An Act to confirm certain Provisional Orders of the Minister of Health relating to the borough of St. Helens and the city of York.
	St. Helens Order 1931 Provisional Order amending the St. Helens Corporation Act 1911 (Note: St. Helens Corporation Act 1911 (1 & 2 Geo. 5. c. cxvii)) and repealing in part a confirmation Act. (Note: Ministry of Health Provisional Orders Confirmation (No. 2) Act 1926 (16 & 17 Geo. 5. c. xx))	
	York Order 1931 Provisional Order partially repealing and amending a local Act (Note: York Extension and Improvement Act 1884 (47 & 48 Vict. c. ccxxxii)) and a confirmation Act. (Note: Local Government Board's Provisional Orders Confirmation (No. 5) Act 1899 (62 & 63 Vict. c. cx))	
Ministry of Health Provisional Orders Confirmation (Godalming and Scunthorpe and Frodingham) Act 1931	21 & 22 Geo. 5. c. lxxx	31 July 1931
An Act to confirm certain Provisional Orders of the Minister of Health relating to Godalming and Scunthorpe and Frodingham.
	Godalming Order 1931 Provisional Order amending a local Act (Note: Godalming Corporation Water Act 1899 (62 & 63 Vict. c. ccix)) and certain confirming Acts.	
	Scunthorpe and Frodingham Order 1931 Provisional Order altering certain local Acts and Orders.	
Ministry of Health Provisional Orders Confirmation (Bristol and Leicester) Act 1931	21 & 22 Geo. 5. c. lxxxi	31 July 1931
An Act to confirm certain Provisional Orders of the Minister of Health relating to Bristol and Leicester.
	Bristol Order 1931 Provisional Order altering a local Act. (Note: Clifton and Durdham Downs (Bristol) Act 1861 (24 & 25 Vict. c. xiv))	
	Leicester (Waterworks) Order 1931 Provisional Order amending the Derwent Valley Water Act 1899. (Note: Derwent Valley Water Act 1899 (62 & 63 Vict. c. cclxix))	
Ministry of Health Provisional Order Confirmation (Abertillery and District Water and Western Valleys (Monmouthshire) Sewerage Board) Act 1931	21 & 22 Geo. 5. c. lxxxii	31 July 1931
An Act to confirm certain Provisional Orders of the Minister of Health relating to the Abertillery and District Water District and Western Valleys (Monmouthshire) Sewerage Board.
	Abertillery and District Water Order 1931 Provisional Order altering and partly repealing certain local Acts.	
	Western Valleys (Monmouthshire) Sewerage Order 1931 Provisional Order for altering a Local Act. (Note: Western Valleys (Monmouthshire) Sewerage Board Act 1903 (3 Edw. 7. c. ccxlviii))	
Ministry of Health Provisional Order Confirmation (Lancaster and District Joint Hospital District) Act 1931 (repealed)	21 & 22 Geo. 5. c. lxxxiii	31 July 1931
An Act to confirm a Provisional Order of the Minister of Health relating to the Lancaster and District Joint Hospital District. (Repealed by County of Lancashire Act 1984 (c. xxi))
	Lancaster and District Joint Hospital Order 1931 Provisional Order forming a united district under section 279 of the Public Health Act 1875.	
Midlothian County Council (Calder) Water Order Confirmation Act 1931 (repealed)	21 & 22 Geo. 5. c. lxxxiv	31 July 1931
An Act to confirm a Provisional Order under the Private Legislation Procedure (Scotland) Act 1899 relating to Midlothian County Council (Calder) Water. (Repealed by Edinburgh Corporation Order Confirmation Act 1958 (7 & 8 Eliz. 2. c. v))
	Midlothian County Council (Calder) Water Order 1931 Provisional Order to authorise the county council of the county of Midlothian to borrow further moneys and for other purposes.	
Perth Corporation Order Confirmation Act 1931	21 & 22 Geo. 5. c. lxxxv	31 July 1931
An Act to confirm a Provisional Order under the Private Legislation Procedure (Scotland) Act 1899 relating to Perth Corporation.
	Perth Corporation Order 1931 Provisional Order to authorise the lord provost magistrates and councillors of the city and royal burgh of Perth to establish an art gallery and museums and for other purposes.	
Ipswich Corporation (Trolley Vehicles) Order Confirmation Act 1931	21 & 22 Geo. 5. c. lxxxvi	31 July 1931
An Act to confirm a Provisional Order made by the Minister of Transport under the Ipswich Corporation Act 1925 (Note: Ipswich Corporation Act 1925 (15 & 16 Geo. 5. c. ciii)) relating to the Ipswich Corporation Trolley Vehicles.
	Ipswich Corporation (Trolley Vehicles) Order 1931 Provisional Order authorising the mayor aldermen and burgesses of the borough of Ipswich to provide maintain and use trolley vehicles upon certain routes in that borough and in the parish of Sproughton.	
York Corporation (Trolley Vehicles) Order Confirmation Act 1931	21 & 22 Geo. 5. c. lxxxvii	31 July 1931
An Act to confirm a Provisional Order made by the Minister of Transport under the York Corporation Act 1914 (Note: York Corporation Act 1914 (4 & 5 Geo. 5. c. clxxxviii)) relating to the York Corporation trolley vehicles.
	York Corporation (Trolley Vehicles) Order 1931 Provisional Order authorising the lord mayor aldermen and citizens of the city of York to provide maintain and use trolley vehicles upon a route in the city of York and the parish of Fulford Water in the rural district of Escrick.	
Darlington Corporation Trolley Vehicles (Additional Routes) Order Confirmation Act 1931	21 & 22 Geo. 5. c. lxxxviii	31 July 1931
An Act to confirm a Provisional Order made by the Minister of Transport under the Darlington Corporation (Transport &c.) Act 1925 (Note: Darlington Corporation (Transport, &c.) Act 1925 (15 & 16 Geo. 5. c. cxvi)) relating to the Darlington Corporation Trolley Vehicles.
	Darlington Corporation Trolley Vehicles (Additional Routes) Order 1931 Provisional Order authorising the mayor aldermen and burgesses of the county borough of Darlington to use trolley vehicles upon additional routes in the county borough of Darlington.	
Pier and Harbour Orders (Cowes and Yarmouth (Isle of Wight)) Confirmation Act 1931	21 & 22 Geo. 5. c. lxxxix	31 July 1931
An Act to confirm certain Provisional Orders made by the Minister of Transport under the General Pier and Harbour Act 1861 (Note: General Pier and Harbour Act 1861 (24 & 25 Vict. c. 45)) relating to Cowes and Yarmouth (Isle of Wight).
	Cowes Harbour Order 1931 Provisional Order to alter the limits of Cowes Roads to authorise the Commissioners for the Harbour of Cowes to demand new and increased rates dues and charges and for other purposes.	
	Yarmouth (Isle of Wight) Pier and Harbour Order 1931 Provisional Order to make further provision with respect to the Pier and Harbour at Yarmouth in the Isle of Wight and for other purposes.	
Grand Union Canal Act 1931	21 & 22 Geo. 5. c. xc	31 July 1931
An Act to empower the Grand Union Canal Company to execute works and improve part of their canal to confer powers upon that company with reference to part of the Oxford Canal Navigation and for other purposes.
Bacup Corporation Act 1931	21 & 22 Geo. 5. c. xci	31 July 1931
An Act to confer powers upon the mayor aldermen and burgesses of the borough of Bacup in regard to the running of public service vehicles and to make further provision in relation to the tramway and light railway water and electricity undertakings of the said mayor aldermen and burgesses and for other purposes.
London and North Eastern Railway Act 1931	21 & 22 Geo. 5. c. xcii	31 July 1931
An Act to empower the London and North Eastern Railway Company to construct new railways widenings and other works and to acquire lands and for other purposes.
London Squares Preservation Act 1931	21 & 22 Geo. 5. c. xciii	31 July 1931
An Act to provide for the preservation and for restricting the user of certain squares gardens and enclosures in the administrative county of London and for other purposes.
Salvation Army Act 1931	21 & 22 Geo. 5. c. xciv	31 July 1931
An Act to provide for the better organization of the Salvation Army and for the custody of real and personal property held upon charitable trusts by or the administration whereof devolves upon the General of the Salvation Army and for other purposes.
Dagenham Urban District Council Act 1931	21 & 22 Geo. 5. c. xcv	31 July 1931
An Act to make provision in regard to the utilisation of certain waste lands known as Beacontree Heath in the Dagenham urban district and to make further provision in regard to the improvement health local government and finance of the district and for other purposes.
Seaton Urban District Council Act 1931	21 & 22 Geo. 5. c. xcvi	31 July 1931
An Act to authorise the Seaton Urban District Council to construct new waterworks for obtaining a supply of water from the Holyford Brook and for other purposes.
Sheffield Gas Act 1931	21 & 22 Geo. 5. c. xcvii	31 July 1931
An Act to enlarge and alter the powers and obligations of the Sheffield Gas Company with respect to the purchase and supply of coke oven gas to extend the Company's limits of supply to increase their borrowing powers and for other purposes.
Ashton-under-Lyne, Stalybridge and Dukinfield (District) Waterworks Act 1931 (repealed)	21 & 22 Geo. 5. c. xcviii	31 July 1931
An Act to confer further powers on the Ashton-under-Lyne Stalybridge and Dukinfield (District) Waterworks Joint Committee and the authorities represented upon that committee to extend the limits of supply of the said committee and for other purposes. (Repealed by West Pennine Water Order 1968 (SI 1968/512))
Southampton Corporation Act 1931	21 & 22 Geo. 5. c. xcix	31 July 1931
An Act to empower the mayor aldermen and burgesses of the borough of Southampton to construct street improvements and waterworks to extend their limits for the supply of water to empower them to acquire the undertaking of the Company of Proprietors of the Southampton and Itchen Floating Bridge and Roads and to make further provision with regard to the several undertakings of the Corporation and to the health local government and improvement of the borough and for other purposes.
Metropolitan Water Board Act 1931	21 & 22 Geo. 5. c. c	31 July 1931
An Act to empower the Metropolitan Water Board to execute works and to acquire lands and for other purposes.
Surrey County Council Act 1931	21 & 22 Geo. 5. c. ci	31 July 1931
An Act to confer further powers on the Surrey County Council and to enact further provisions with respect to the good government and administration and the preservation of the amenities of the administrative county of Surrey to enact provisions with respect to the control of massage establishments places of public entertainment sale of coke moveable dwellings and camping grounds town planning and roads within the county to authorise the Council and the Barnes Urban District Council to construct street works and for other purposes.
Taunton Corporation Act 1931	21 & 22 Geo. 5. c. cii	31 July 1931
An Act to empower the mayor aldermen and burgesses of the borough of Taunton to purchase lands for various purposes to construct additional waterworks to confer further powers upon the Corporation with regard to their water undertaking and their markets undertaking to make further provision with regard to the health local government and improvement of the borough and the supply of electricity in the borough and neighbourhood to extend the boundaries of the borough and for other purposes.
West Hartlepool Corporation Act 1931 (repealed)	21 & 22 Geo. 5. c. ciii	31 July 1931
An Act to extend the boundaries of the county borough of West Hartlepool to confer further powers upon the mayor aldermen and burgesses of that borough with regard to their road transport and electricity undertakings and the health local government and improvement of the borough and for other purposes. (Repealed by County of Cleveland Act 1987 (c. ix))
Corby (Northants) and District Water Act 1931 or the Corby (Northamptonshire) and District Water Act 1931	21 & 22 Geo. 5. c. civ	31 July 1931
An Act to incorporate and confer powers upon the Corby (Northants) and District Water Company for the construction and maintenance of waterworks and for supplying water in parts of the counties of Northampton Leicester and Rutland.
Felixstowe and District Water Act 1931	21 & 22 Geo. 5. c. cv	31 July 1931
An Act to authorise the Felixstowe and Walton Waterworks Company to construct new works and to raise additional capital to extend the Company's limits of supply to change the name of the Company and for other purposes.
Scarborough Corporation Act 1931	21 & 22 Geo. 5. c. cvi	31 July 1931
An Act to empower the corporation of Scarborough to construct street improvements and waterworks and to confer further powers upon them in regard to their water and electricity undertakings to make further provision for the improvement and good government of the borough and in regard to road transport therein to confer further powers upon the Scarborough Harbour Commissioners and to make further provision in regard to the harbour undertaking and for other purposes.
Grand Union Canal (Leicester Canals Purchase, &c.) Act 1931	21 & 22 Geo. 5. c. cvii	31 July 1931
An Act to provide for the transfer to the Grand Union Canal Company of the undertakings of the Company of Proprietors of the Leicester Navigation the Company of Proprietors of the Navigation from the River Trent to the Town of Loughborough and the Company of Proprietors of the Erewash Canal in the counties of Derby and Nottingham to authorise the Grand Union Canal Company to execute works and for other purposes.
Ebenezer Chapel Birmingham Act 1931	21 & 22 Geo. 5. c. cviii	31 July 1931
An Act to authorise the sale of the site of the Ebenezer Chapel and the burial ground and schoolrooms attached thereto (all in the city of Birmingham) and the application of the proceeds of sale thereof and for other purposes.
Brighton Corporation Act 1931	21 & 22 Geo. 5. c. cix	30 September 1931
An Act to consolidate with amendments the local Acts and Orders in force within the borough of Brighton and relating to the several undertakings of the Brighton Corporation to confer further powers on the Corporation in relation to those undertakings and other matters to make better provision for the health local government improvement and finance of the borough and for other purposes.
Ardrossan Harbour Order Confirmation Act 1931 (repealed)	21 & 22 Geo. 5. c. cx	7 October 1931
An Act to confirm a Provisional Order under the Private Legislation Procedure (Scotland) Act 1899 relating to Ardrossan Harbour. (Repealed by Ardrossan Harbour Revision Order 1977 (SI 1977/933))
	Ardrossan Harbour Order 1931 Provisional Order to authorise the Ardrossan Harbour Company to borrow further moneys for the purpose of their undertaking.	
Ministry of Health Provisional Order Confirmation (Chepping Wycombe) Act 1931 (repealed)	21 & 22 Geo. 5. c. cxi	7 October 1931
An Act to confirm a Provisional Order of the Minister of Health relating to the borough of Chepping Wycombe. (Repealed by Bucks Water Board Act 1959 (7 & 8 Eliz. 2. c. xxxii))
	Chepping Wycombe (Local Acts Amendment) Order 1931 Provisional Order altering certain local Acts.	
London Electric, Metropolitan District and Central London Railway Companies (Works) Act 1931	21 & 22 Geo. 5. c. cxii	7 October 1931
An Act to empower the London Electric Railway Company to construct new railways and a subway and works and to raise additional moneys to empower the Metropolitan District Railway Company to acquire lands to empower the Central London Railway Company to construct subways and works and to confer further powers on the said companies and on the City and South London Railway Company and for other purposes.

== 22 & 23 Geo. 5 ==
The first session of the 36th Parliament of the United Kingdom, which met from 3 November 1931 until 17 November 1932.

This session was also traditionally cited as 22 & 23 G. 5

=== Public general acts ===
Short title	Citation	Royal assent
Long title
Abnormal Importations (Customs Duties) Act 1931 (repealed)	22 & 23 Geo. 5. c. 1	20 November 1931
An Act to make provision for the imposition of duties of Customs on articles wholly or mainly manufactured which are being imported into the United Kingdom in abnormal quantities, and for purposes connected therewith. (Repealed by Statute Law Revision Act 1950 (14 Geo. 6. c. 6))
Expiring Laws Act 1931 (repealed)	22 & 23 Geo. 5. c. 2	1 December 1931
An Act to deal with certain Expiring Laws by making some of them permanent and continuing the remainder for limited periods. (Repealed by Statute Law (Repeals) Act 1976 (c. 16))
Horticultural Products (Emergency Customs Duties) Act 1931 (repealed)	22 & 23 Geo. 5. c. 3	11 December 1931
An Act to make provision for the imposition of duties of Customs on certain descriptions of fresh fruit, fresh vegetables, flowers, bulbs, plants and foliage, and for purposes connected therewith. (Repealed by Statute Law Revision Act 1950 (14 Geo. 6. c. 6))
Statute of Westminster 1931	22 & 23 Geo. 5. c. 4	11 December 1931
An Act to give effect to certain resolutions passed by Imperial Conferences held in the years 1926 and 1930.
Educational Endowments (Scotland) Act 1931 (repealed)	22 & 23 Geo. 5. c. 5	11 December 1931
An Act to extend by three years the period during which the powers of the Commissioners appointed under the Educational Endowments (Scotland) Act, 1928, (Note: Educational Endowments (Scotland) Act 1928 (18 & 19 Geo. 5. c. 30)) may be exercised, and for purposes incidental to such extension. (Repealed by Education (Scotland) Act 1946 (9 & 10 Geo. 6. c. 72))
National Health Insurance (Prolongation of Insurance) Act 1931 (repealed)	22 & 23 Geo. 5. c. 6	11 December 1931
An Act to amend subsection (3) of section three of the National Health Insurance Act, 1924, (Note: National Health Insurance Act 1924 (14 & 15 Geo. 5. c. 38)) and to make financial provision in connection with such amendment. (Repealed by National Health Insurance Act 1936 (26 Geo. 5 & 1 Edw. 8. c. 32))
Indian Pay (Temporary Abatements) Act 1931 (repealed)	22 & 23 Geo. 5. c. 7	11 December 1931
An Act to authorise the making of temporary abatements from the pay of persons in the service of the Crown in India notwithstanding subsisting statutory rights. (Repealed by Statute Law Revision Act 1950 (14 Geo. 6. c. 6))

=== Local acts ===
Short title	Citation	Royal assent
Long title
Kilmarnock Gas Order Confirmation Act 1931	22 & 23 Geo. 5. c. i	11 December 1931
An Act to confirm a Provisional Order under the Burgh Police (Scotland) Act 1892 (Note: Burgh Police (Scotland) Act 1892 (55 & 56 Vict. c. 55)) relating to Kilmarnock Gas.
	Kilmarnock Gas Order 1931 Provisional Order.	
Clydebank Burgh Order Confirmation Act 1931	22 & 23 Geo. 5. c. ii	11 December 1931
An Act to confirm a Provisional Order under the Private Legislation Procedure (Scotland) Act 1899 (Note: Private Legislation Procedure (Scotland) Act 1899 (62 & 63 Vict. c. 47)) relating to Clydebank Burgh.
	Clydebank Burgh Order 1931 Provisional Order to amend the Clydebank Burgh Extension Act 1925 (Note: Clydebank Burgh Extension Act 1925 (15 & 16 Geo. 5. c. cxiv)) and for other purposes.	

== See also ==
- List of acts of the Parliament of the United Kingdom
