= Allied Forces Act 1940 =

Act of the Parliament of the United Kingdom

Allied Forces Act 1940 (Note: Section 5(1).)
- Act of Parliament
- Parliament of the United Kingdom
- Long title: An Act to make provision with respect to the discipline and internal administration of certain allied and associated forces, and for the application in relation to those forces of the Visiting Forces (British Commonwealth) Act, 1933, the Naval Discipline Act, the Army Act and the Air Force Act.
- Citation: 3 & 4 Geo. 6. c. 51
- Introduced by: Sir Edward Grigg (Commons)
- Territorial extent: United Kingdom

Dates
- Royal assent: 22 August 1940
- Commencement: 22 August 1940 (Note: The Acts of Parliament (Commencement) Act 1793.)
- Expired: On a date fixed by Order in Council (Note: Section 5(2).)
- Repealed: 12 June 1954 (Note: The Visiting Forces Act 1952 (Commencement) Order 1954 (SI 1954/633).)
Other legislation
Amended by	Allied Powers (War Service) Act 1942
Repealed by	Visiting Forces Act 1952
Relates to	Visiting Forces (British Commonwealth) Act 1933; Allied Powers (War Service) Act 1942

Status: Repealed

Text of statute as originally enacted

The Allied Forces Act 1940 (3 & 4 Geo. 6. c. 51) was an act of the Parliament of the United Kingdom passed in late 1940, after the fall of France.

The act gave legal authority for the recognised sovereign governments of Belgium, Czechoslovakia, the Netherlands, Norway and Poland – all countries then under German occupation – to raise, equip and maintain independent armed forces on British soil. A sixth country, France, was provided for by authorising the activity of the Free French forces under Charles de Gaulle. The forces would be fully independent, under their own operational command and military law, though in practice it was expected that the British high command would direct general strategy and control joint operations. The act would later be extended to cover Luxembourg, Greece and Yugoslavia.

It allowed these nations to remain active and independent allies in the war, rather than simply providing manpower and moral support to the United Kingdom and the remainder of the British Empire.

It was essential that these foreign Governments, after being invited to come to this country, should have their own national armies here. These armies are the symbol of nationhood to millions of people and to their enslaved countrymen throughout Europe. I trust that, when the time arrives to which the Prime Minister pointed yesterday, and when there is a great resurgence in those countries, these armies will be the spearhead of the Forces of liberation and will see them through their present perils and trials.

After the act was passed, national units were quickly formed or reconstituted; by late October, the size of the Allied contingents serving with Home Forces were given as 18,000 Poles, 15,000 Norwegians and 3,000 Czechoslovaks, as well as around 3,000 Belgian, Dutch and French soldiers, as well as a large number of naval and air-force personnel.

== Subsequent developments ==
The Allied Powers (War Service) Act 1942 (5 & 6 Geo. 6. c. 29) made provision for the liability of nationals of allied powers to war service, defined for the purposes of the 1940 act membership of certain allied and associated forces, and removed doubts about the power to imprison or detain people sentenced by service courts exercising jurisdiction under it.

The whole act was repealed by section 18(b) of the Visiting Forces Act 1952 (15 & 16 Geo. 6 & 1 Eliz. 2. c. 67), together with the United States of America (Visiting Forces) Act 1942, which came into force on 12 June 1954. The 1952 act preserved the effect of the repealed provisions for people who were imprisoned or detained under them immediately before the repeal.
