= Ghana Independence Act 1957 =

Act of the Parliament of the United Kingdom

Ghana Independence Act 1957 (Note: Section 5(1).)
- Act of Parliament
- Parliament of the United Kingdom
- Long title: An Act to make provision for, and in connection with, the attainment by the Gold Coast of fully responsible status within the British Commonwealth of Nations.
- Citation: 5 & 6 Eliz. 2. c. 6
- Territorial extent: United Kingdom

Dates
- Royal assent: 7 February 1957
- Commencement: 6 March 1957 (Note: Section 5(2).)
Other legislation
Amends	Merchant Shipping Act 1894; Visiting Forces (British Commonwealth) Act 1933; Colonial Stock Act 1934; Whaling Industry (Regulation) Act 1934; Emergency Powers (Defence) Act 1939; Ships and Aircraft (Transfer Restriction) Act 1939; British Nationality Act 1948; Merchant Shipping Act 1948; Income Tax Act 1952; Visiting Forces Act 1952
Amended by	Naval Discipline Act 1957; Emergency Laws (Repeal) Act 1959; Trustee Investments Act 1961; Diplomatic Privileges Act 1964; Statute Law (Repeals) Act 1969; Finance Act 1969; Statute Law (Repeals) Act 1976; Statute Law (Repeals) Act 1977; Interpretation Act 1978; British Nationality Act 1981; Copyright, Designs and Patents Act 1988; Merchant Shipping Act 1995; Armed Forces Act 2006
Relates to	Colonial Laws Validity Act 1865; Ceylon Independence Act 1947

Status: Amended

Text of statute as originally enacted

Revised text of statute as amended

Text of the Ghana Independence Act 1957 as in force today (including any amendments) within the United Kingdom, from legislation.gov.uk.

The Ghana Independence Act 1957 (5 & 6 Eliz. 2. c. 6) is an act of the Parliament of the United Kingdom that granted the Gold Coast fully responsible government within the British Commonwealth of Nations under the name of Ghana. The act received royal assent on 7 February 1957 and Ghana came into being on 6 March 1957.

== Background ==
Independence within the British Commonwealth could not be attained by a dependent territory like the Gold Coast without legislation passed at Westminster. The main provisions of the act closely follow the Statute of Westminster 1931 (22 & 23 Geo. 5. c. 4) and the Ceylon Independence Act 1947 (11 & 12 Geo. 6. c. 7)). The grant of independence to the Gold Coast was achieved by two separate legislative operations, namely, the passing of the act and the making of the Ghana (Constitution) Order in Council 1957. A matter that complicated the legislation was that what was to become Ghana was not a single constitutional unit but rather four distinct areas:

- The Gold Coast Colony which was a Crown Colony and therefore part of Her Majesty's dominions;
- Ashanti which was likewise a Crown Colony and part of Her Majesty's dominions;
- the Northern Territories of the Gold Coast which was a British Protectorate and not part of Her Majesty's dominions; and
- British Togoland which was a United Nations trust territory and not part of Her Majesty's dominions.

With respect to the Northern Territories, the legislation terminated the agreements with the native chiefs on which the protectorate status was based. With respect to British Togoland, a referendum was held to determine the consent of its people to being united with the rest of what would become Ghana. With effect from when the act entered into force all of what became Ghana became part of Her Majesty's dominions as a single, unified dominion named Ghana.

== Road to Independence ==
The independence legislation began to take shape following the return of the Convention People's Party to power at the Gold Coast general election of 1954. The party won 79 out of 104 seats. The Gold Coast government expressed its hope of achieving independence within the lifetime of the new assembly.

A dispute within the Gold Coast about the form of Constitution after independence was still unresolved as late as 1956. The same year the United Kingdom government publicly stated that provided it had the support of a "reasonable majority", the United Kingdom was prepared to legislate for the Gold Coast to have independence within the British Commonwealth. The Secretary of State for the Colonies added that "[f]ull membership of the Commonwealth is, of course, a different question and is a matter for consultation between all existing members of the Commonwealth." This distinction reflected the view that full Commonwealth membership required the consent of all Commonwealth members. Ultimately, Ghana's full Commonwealth membership was consented to by all Commonwealth members. The Commonwealth's agreement to this was announced by the United Kingdom prime minister on 21 February 1957. Letters patent constituting the office of the Governor-General of Ghana and royal instructions to the Governor-General were issued on 23 February 1957 and became effective on 6 March 1957. An Order in Council provided Ghana with its first constitution.

== Independence Day ==
The 6 March independence date was chosen for its historical significance: On 6 March 1844, a group of Fante chiefs in Ghana had signed a treaty with the then British governor. That treaty, which became known as the Bond of 1844, came to symbolise the sovereignty of the local government of indigenous authorities.
