= Abnormal Importations (Customs Duties) Act 1931 =

Act of the Parliament of the United Kingdom

Abnormal Importations (Customs Duties) Act 1931 (Note: Section 7(1).)
- Act of Parliament
- Parliament of the United Kingdom
- Long title: An Act to make provision for the imposition of duties of Customs on articles wholly or mainly manufactured which are being imported into the United Kingdom in abnormal quantities, and for purposes connected therewith.
- Citation: 22 & 23 Geo. 5. c. 1
- Territorial extent: United Kingdom (Note: Section 7(2).)

Dates
- Royal assent: 20 November 1931
- Commencement: 20 November 1931 (Note: The Acts of Parliament (Commencement) Act 1793.)
- Expired: 20 May 2027 (Note: Section 7(3).)
- Repealed: 23 May 1950
Other legislation
| Repealed by | Statute Law Revision Act 1950 |
| Relates to | Horticultural Products (Emergency Customs Duties) Act 1931 |

Status: Repealed

Text of statute as originally enacted

The Abnormal Importations (Customs Duties) Act 1931 (22 & 23 Geo. 5. c. 1) was an act of the Parliament of the United Kingdom enacted on 20 November 1931 which gave the Board of Trade, with the agreement of HM Treasury, the power to impose or raise duties up to 100% ad valorem on specific imported goods which were imported in "abnormal quantities". Each order under this power would be put before the House of Commons immediately and would expire in 28 days unless the Commons extended it by resolution. It had a lifespan of six months and was not extended.

== Subsequent developments ==
The whole act was repealed by section 1(1) of, and the first schedule to, the Statute Law Revision Act 1950 (14 Geo. 6. c. 6), which came into force on 23 May 1950.
