= Horticultural Products (Emergency Customs Duties) Act 1931 =

Act of the Parliament of the United Kingdom

Horticultural Products (Emergency Customs Duties) Act 1931 (Note: Section 6(1).)
- Act of Parliament
- Parliament of the United Kingdom
- Long title: An Act to make provision for the imposition of duties of Customs on certain descriptions of fresh fruit, fresh vegetables, flowers, bulbs, plants and foliage, and for purposes connected therewith.
- Citation: 22 & 23 Geo. 5. c. 3
- Territorial extent: United Kingdom (Note: Section 6(2).)

Dates
- Royal assent: 11 December 1931
- Commencement: 11 December 1931 (Note: The Acts of Parliament (Commencement) Act 1793.)
- Expired: 11 December 1932 (Note: Section 6(3).)
- Repealed: 23 May 1950
Other legislation
Repealed by	Statute Law Revision Act 1950
Relates to	Abnormal Importations (Customs Duties) Act 1931

Status: Repealed

Text of statute as originally enacted

The Horticultural Products (Emergency Customs Duties) Act 1931 (22 & 23 Geo. 5. c. 3) was an act of the Parliament of the United Kingdom passed in late 1931 which gave the Minister of Agriculture the power to impose or raise import duties on fresh fruits, flowers and vegetables.

== Subsequent developments ==
The whole act was repealed by section 1(1) of, and the first schedule to, the Statute Law Revision Act 1950 (14 Geo. 6. c. 6), which came into force on 23 May 1950.
