= Belize Act 1981 =

Act of the Parliament of the United Kingdom

Belize Act 1981 (Note: Section 7.)
- Act of Parliament
- Parliament of the United Kingdom
- Long title: An Act to make provision for, and in connection with, the attainment by Belize of independence within the Commonwealth.
- Citation: 1981 c. 52
- Territorial extent: United Kingdom

Dates
- Royal assent: 28 July 1981
- Commencement: 21 September 1981 (Note: Section 1. The Belize Independence Order 1981 (SI 1981/1107).)
Other legislation
Amends	Colonial Stock Act 1877; Merchant Shipping Act 1894; Imperial Institute Act 1925; Visiting Forces (British Commonwealth) Act 1933; Whaling Industry (Regulation) Act 1934; British Nationality Act 1948; Visiting Forces Act 1952; Army Act 1955; Air Force Act 1955; Naval Discipline Act 1957
Amended by	British Nationality Act 1981; Civil Aviation (Amendment) Act 1982; Merchant Shipping Act 1995; Statute Law (Repeals) Act 1995; Statute Law (Repeals) Act 1998; Commonwealth Act 2002; Armed Forces Act 2006

Status: Amended

Text of statute as originally enacted

Revised text of statute as amended

Text of the Belize Act 1981 as in force today (including any amendments) within the United Kingdom, from legislation.gov.uk.

The Belize Act 1981 (c. 52) is an act of the Parliament of the United Kingdom.

The act made provisions for the nation of Belize (formerly British Honduras) to gain full independence and become a member of the Commonwealth of Nations as a Commonwealth realm; prior to this, Belize had been a fully self-governing British colony from 1973.

Belize became independent on 21 September 1981.

== Bibliography ==
- Whitaker's Almanack: for the year 1982, complete edition, p. 364. J. Whitaker & Sons, London, 1981
