= List of statutory instruments of the United Kingdom, 1954 =

This is an incomplete list of statutory instruments of the United Kingdom in 1954.

== Statutory instruments ==
=== 1-499 ===
- Purchase Tax (No. 1) Order 1954 (SI 1954/1)
- Purchase Tax (No. 2) Order 1954 (SI 1954/2)
- Purchase Tax (No. 3) Order 1954 (SI 1954/3)
- National Insurance (Industrial Injuries) (Prescribed Diseases) Amendment Regulations 1954 (SI 1954/5)
- Coal Industry Nationalisation (Interim Income) (Rates of Interest) Order 1954 (SI 1954/10)
- Import of Goods (Control) Order 1954 (SI 1954/23)
- Railway Clearing House Scheme Order 1954 (SI 1954/39)
- Double Taxation Relief (Taxes on Income) (Greece) Order 1954 (SI 1954/142)
- Coal Industry (Superannuation Scheme) (Winding Up, No. 6) Regulations 1954 (SI 1954/155)
- Foreign Compensation (Hungary) (Registration) Order 1954 (SI 1954/219)
- Foreign Compensation (Roumania) (Registration) Order 1954 (SI 1954/221)
- Civil Defence (Transport) Regulations 1954 (SI 1954/274)
- Pedestrian Crossing Regulations 1954 (SI 1954/370)
- Higham Ferrers and Rushden Water Board Order 1954 (SI 1954/383)
- Wireless Telegraphy Act 1949 Commencement Order 1954 (SI 1954/437)
- Removal of Bodies Regulations 1954 (SI 1954/448)

=== 500-999 ===
- Import of Goods (Control) (Amendment) Order 1954 (SI 1954/627)
- Visiting Forces Act 1952 (Commencement) Order 1954 (SI 1954/633)
- Visiting Forces (Designation) Order 1954 (SI 1954/634)
- Visiting Forces Act (Application to Colonies) Order 1954 (SI 1954/636)
- Visiting Forces (Designation) (Colonies) Order 1954 (SI 1954/637)
- Horses (Landing from Northern Ireland and the Republic of Ireland) Order 1954 SI 1954/698)
- Atomic Energy Authority (Appointed Day) Order 1954 (SI 1954/832)
- British Transport Commission (Male Wages Grades Pensions) Regulations 1954 (SI 1954/898)
- Non-Indigenous Rabbits (Prohibition of Importation and Keeping) Order 1954 (SI 1954/927)
- Motor Vehicles (Variation of Speed Limit) (Amendment) Regulations 1954 (SI 1954/943)

=== 1000-1499 ===
- Visiting Forces (Designation) (Colonies) (Amendment) Order 1954 (SI 1954/1041)
- Telephones Regulations 1954 (SI 1954/1045)
- Local Government Superannuation (Benefits) Regulations 1954 (SI 1954/1048)
- Agriculture (Miscellaneous Provisions) Act 1954 (Commencement) Order 1954 (SI 1954/1137)
- Superannuation (Local Government Staffs) (National Service) (Amendment) Rules 1954 (SI 1954/1228)
- Local Government Superannuation (England and Scotland) (Amendment) Regulations 1954 (SI 1954/1250)
- Landlord and Tenant (Determination of Rateable Value Procedure) Rules 1954 (SI 1954/1255)
- Justices of the Peace Act 1949 (Compensation) Regulations 1954 (SI 1954/1262)
- Foreign Compensation (Hungary) (Registration) (Amendment) Order 1954 (SI 1954/1371)
- Duty-Free Supplies for the Royal Navy Regulations 1954 (SI 1954/1406)
- British Transport Commission (Amendment of Pension Schemes) Regulations 1954 (SI 1954/1428)
- Rotherham (Repeal of Local Enactments) Order 1954 (SI 1954/1450)

=== 1500-1999 ===
- Savings Bank Annuities (Tables) Order 1954 (SI 1954/1578)
- British Transport Commission (Organisation) Scheme Order 1954 (SI 1954/1579)
- Public Service Vehicles and Trolley Vehicles (Carrying Capacity) Regulations 1954 (SI 1954/1612)

== See also ==
- List of statutory instruments of the United Kingdom
