= Singapore Act 1966 =

Act of the Parliament of the United Kingdom

Singapore Act 1966 (Note: Section 5(1).)
- Act of Parliament
- Parliament of the United Kingdom
- Long title: Act to make provision in connection with the establishment of Singapore as an independent sovereign state within the Commonwealth.
- Citation: 1966 c. 29
- Territorial extent: United Kingdom

Dates
- Royal assent: 9 August 1966
- Commencement: 9 August 1965 (Note: Section 1(4).)
Other legislation
Amends	Merchant Shipping Act 1894; Imperial Institute Act 1925; Visiting Forces (British Commonwealth) Act 1933; British Nationality Act 1948; Merchant Shipping Act 1948; Income Tax Act 1952; Import Duties Act 1958; Diplomatic Immunities (Commonwealth Countries and the Republic of Ireland) Act 1952; Visiting Forces Act 1952; Army Act 1955; Air Force Act 1955; Naval Discipline Act 1957; Films Act 1960; Diplomatic Immunities (Conferences with Commonwealth Countries and Republic of Ireland) Act 1961; Offices, Shops and Railway Premises Act 1963
Amended by	Finance Act 1969; Statute Law (Repeals) Act 1969; International Organisations Act 1981; British Nationality Act 1981; Companies Consolidation (Consequential Provisions) Act 1985; Films Act 1985; Family Law Act 1986; Merchant Shipping Act 1995; Commonwealth Act 2002; Armed Forces Act 2006
Relates to	British Nationality Act 1981; British Overseas Territories Act 2002

Status: Amended

Text of statute as originally enacted

Revised text of statute as amended

Text of the Singapore Act 1966 as in force today (including any amendments) within the United Kingdom, from legislation.gov.uk.

Singapore Act 1966 (c. 29)

The Singapore Act 1966 (c. 29) is an act of the Parliament of the United Kingdom that admitted Singapore as a sovereign state into the Commonwealth of Nations with retroactive effect from 9 August 1965, being the date on which Singapore became a sovereign state within the Commonwealth.

== See also ==
=== Related acts ===
- Malaysia Agreement, signed on 9 July 1963 in London
- Independence of Singapore Agreement 1965
- British Nationality Act 1981
- British Overseas Territories Act 2002

=== Constitutions ===
- Constitution of Singapore
- Constitution of the United Kingdom

== Bibliography ==
- "SINGAPORE BILL [Lords] (Hansard, 3 August 1966)". api.parliament.uk. House of Lords, Parliament of the United Kingdom. 3 August 1966.
