= Federation of Malaya Independence Act 1957 =

Act of the Parliament of the United Kingdom

Federation of Malaya Independence Act 1957 (Note: Section 4(3).)
- Act of Parliament
- Parliament of the United Kingdom
- Long title: An Act to make provision for and in connection with the establishment of the Federation of Malaya as an independent sovereign country within the Commonwealth.
- Citation: 5 & 6 Eliz. 2. c. 60
- Territorial extent: United Kingdom

Dates
- Royal assent: 31 July 1957
- Commencement: 31 August 1957 (Note: Section 1(5). The Federation of Malaya Independence Order in Council 1957 (SI 1957/1533).)
Other legislation
Amends	Merchant Shipping Act 1894; Copyright Act 1911; Visiting Forces (British Commonwealth) Act 1933; Whaling Industry (Regulation) Act 1934; Straits Settlements (Repeal) Act 1946; Merchant Shipping Act 1948; British Nationality Act 1948; Income Tax Act 1952; Diplomatic Immunities (Commonwealth Countries and Republic of Ireland) Act 1952; Visiting Forces Act 1952; Army Act 1955; Air Force Act 1955; Naval Discipline Act 1957
Amended by	Trustee Investments Act 1961; Emergency Laws (Repeal) Act 1959; Malaysia Act 1963; Finance Act 1969; Statute Law (Repeals) Act 1974; Statute Law (Repeals) Act 1976; Statute Law (Repeals) Act 1977; Copyright, Designs and Patents Act 1988; Statute Law (Repeals) Act 1989; Merchant Shipping Act 1995

Status: Amended

Text of statute as originally enacted

Revised text of statute as amended

Text of the Federation of Malaya Independence Act 1957 as in force today (including any amendments) within the United Kingdom, from legislation.gov.uk.

The Federation of Malaya Independence Act 1957 (5 & 6 Eliz. 2. c. 60) is an act of the Parliament of the United Kingdom. It came into operation on 31 July 1957.

The act made provisions for the nation of Federation of Malaya (formerly the Protected States of Johor, Kedah, Kelantan, Negeri Sembilan, Pahang, Perak, Perlis, Selangor, and Terengganu) and the Settlements of Penang and Malacca to gain an independent sovereign country within and become a member of the Commonwealth of Nations on 31 August 1957; prior to this, Federation of Malaya (formerly Malay States) had been a fully self-governing British colony.

== History ==
The Malayan Union came into being in 1946. It was established by British Malaya and comprised the Federated Malay States (Perak, Selangor, Negeri Sembilan, Pahang), the Unfederated Malay States (Kedah, Perlis, Kelantan, Terengganu, Johor) and the Straits Settlements of Penang and Malacca. In a series of agreements between the British and the Malayan Union, the Malayan Union was superseded by the Federation of Malaya on 1 February 1948.

After extensive work to stabilize the political situation and reduce racial tensions, the British government finally ceded full autonomy to the Federation of Malaya on 31 August 1957, and the country achieved independence, led by the inaugural prime minister Tunku Abdul Rahman, who remained in office until 1970.

== Subsequent developments ==
Section 4(2) of, and schedule 2 to, the act were repealed by section 1 of, and part XI of the schedule to, the Statute Law (Repeals) Act 1974, which came into force on 27 June 1974.

Section 3 of the act was repealed by section 1(1) of, and part VI of schedule 1 to, the Statute Law (Repeals) Act 1989, which came into force on 16 November 1989.

== See also ==
- Hari Merdeka (Independence Day)
- Malayan Declaration of Independence
- United Nations Security Council Resolution 125
