= Naval Discipline Act 1957 =

Act of the Parliament of the United Kingdom

Naval Discipline Act 1957 (Note: Section 139(1).)
- Act of Parliament
- Parliament of the United Kingdom
- Long title: An Act to make provision for the discipline of the Navy, and for other purposes connected with the Navy.
- Citation: 5 & 6 Eliz. 2. c. 53
- Territorial extent: United Kingdom

Dates
- Royal assent: 31 July 1957
- Commencement: 1 January 1959 (Note: Section 139(2). The Naval Discipline Act 1957 (Commencement) Order 1958 (SI 1958/1952).)
- Repealed: 31 October 2009 (Note: The Armed Forces Act 2006 (Commencement No. 5) Order 2009 (SI 2009/1167).)
Other legislation
Amends	Colonial Naval Defence Act 1931
Repeals/revokes	Freight for Treasure Act 1819; Naval Deserters Act 1847; Naval Discipline Act 1866; Naval Discipline Act 1884; Naval Discipline Act 1909; Naval Discipline (Dominion Naval Forces) Act 1911; Navy (Pledging of Certificates, etc.) Act 1914; Naval Discipline Act 1915; Naval Discipline (No. 2) Act 1915; Naval Discipline Act 1917; Naval Discipline Act 1922; Naval Discipline (Amendment) Act 1938; Naval Discipline (Amendment) Act 1941
Amended by	Homicide Act 1957; Federation of Malaya Independence Act 1957; Murder (Abolition of Death Penalty) Act 1965; Singapore Act 1966; Armed Forces Act 1966; Courts-Martial (Appeals) Act 1968; Genocide Act 1969; Criminal Justice Act 1972; Northern Ireland (Emergency Provisions) Act 1973; Biological Weapons Act 1974; Statute Law (Repeals) Act 1974; Administration of Justice Act 1977; Statute Law (Repeals) Act 1977; Criminal Attempts Act 1981; Belize Act 1981; Armed Forces Act 1981; Law Reform (Miscellaneous Provisions) (Scotland) Act 1985; Family Law Reform Act 1987; Chemical Weapons Act 1996; Youth Justice and Criminal Evidence Act 1999; Armed Forces Discipline Act 2000International Criminal Court Act 2001; Justice (Northern Ireland) Act 2002; Mental Health Act 2007
Repealed by	Armed Forces Act 2006

Status: Repealed

Text of statute as originally enacted

Revised text of statute as amended

The Naval Discipline Act 1957 (5 & 6 Eliz. 2. c. 53) was an act of the Parliament of the United Kingdom governing discipline in the Royal Navy. It governed courts-martial and criminal penalties for crimes committed by officers and ratings of the Royal Navy. It was substantially replaced at the end of 2008 by the Armed Forces Act 2006, which created a unified code of military law for all three British Armed Forces. The whole act was repealed in October 2009.

== Provisions ==
=== Repealed enactments ===
Section 137(1) of the act repealed 30 enactments, listed in the sixth schedule to the act.

Citation	Short title	Extent of repeal
59 Geo. 3. c. 25	Freight for Treasure Act 1819	The whole act.
5 & 6 Will. 4. c. 24	Naval Enlistment Act 1835	In section one, the words from "Provided also", in the first place where those words occur, to "forces by sea". Sections two and three.
10 & 11 Vict. c. 62	Naval Deserters Act 1847	The whole act.
16 & 17 Vict. c. 69	Naval Enlistment Act 1853	In section twelve, the words from "or of aiding" to "vessel".
16 & 17 Vict. c. 73	Naval Volunteers Act 1853	Sections twenty-one to twenty-four.
22 & 23 Vict. c. 40	Royal Naval Reserve (Volunteer) Act 1859	Sections eleven and twelve. In section fifteen the words from the beginning to "while in actual service; and", and the words from "Provided that" to the end of the section. Sections nineteen to twenty-two.
26 & 27 Vict. c. 69	Officers of Royal Naval Reserve Act 1863	In section two the words from "and shall" to the end of the section.
29 & 30 Vict. c. 109	Naval Discipline Act 1866	The whole act.
47 & 48 Vict. c. 39	Naval Discipline Act 1884	The whole act.
59 & 60 Vict. c. 33	Royal Naval Reserve Volunteer Act 1896	Section two.
9 Edw. 7. c. 41	Naval Discipline Act 1909	The whole act.
1 & 2 Geo. 5. c. 47	Naval Discipline (Dominion Naval Forces) Act 1911	The whole act.
4 & 5 Geo. 5. c. 89	Navy (Pledging of Certificates, etc.) Act 1914	The whole act.
5 & 6 Geo. 5. c. 30	Naval Discipline Act 1915	The whole act.
5 & 6 Geo. 5. c. 73	Naval Discipline (No. 2) Act 1915	The whole act.
7 & 8 Geo. 5. c. 34	Naval Discipline Act 1917	The whole act.
7 & 8 Geo. 5. c. 51	Air Force (Constitution) Act 1917	Section seven and the First Schedule.
12 & 13 Geo. 5. c. 37	Naval Discipline Act 1922	The whole act.
15 & 16 Geo. 5. c. 88	Coastguard Act 1925	In section two the words from "and be" to "commission".
21 & 22 Geo. 5. c. 9	Colonial Naval Defence Act 1931	In section two, in subsection (2) the words from "and while" to the end of paragraph (c). In section four, subsection (4).
1 & 2 Geo. 6. c. 64	Naval Discipline (Amendment) Act 1938	The whole act.
4 & 5 Geo. 6. c. 29	Naval Discipline (Amendment) Act 1941	The whole act.
10 & 11 Geo. 6. c. 24	Naval Forces (Enforcement of Maintenance Liabilities) Act 1947	In section one, subsection (4).
10 & 11 Geo. 6. c. 30	Indian Independence Act 1947	Section thirteen.
11 & 12 Geo. 6. c. 10	Emergency Laws (Miscellaneous Provisions) Act 1947	In the Second Schedule, paragraph 3.
11 & 12 Geo. 6. c. 64	National Service Act 1948	In section twenty-six, paragraph (b) of subsection (2), and subsection (3).
14 & 15 Geo. 6. c. 46	Courts-Martial (Appeals) Act 1951	In section twenty-four, in subsection (1), in the definition of "naval court-martial", the words "constituted under section fifty-seven A of that Act".
3 & 4 Eliz. 2. c. 20	Revision of the Army and Air Force Acts (Transitional Provisions) Act 1955	In the Second Schedule, paragraph 1, sub-paragraph (3) of paragraph 6, and paragraph 7.
5 & 6 Eliz. 2. c. 6	Ghana Independence Act 1957	In section four, in subsection (2), the words "and in section eighty-six of the Naval Discipline Act as amended by the Revision of the Army and Air Force Acts (Transitional Provisions) Act, 1955".
5 & 6 Eliz. 2. c. 11	Homicide Act 1957	In section eight, subsection (2). In section nine, in subsection (2), the words "and the first paragraph of section forty-five of the Naval Discipline Act".

== Subsequent developments ==
Section 137(1) of, and schedule 6 to, the act were repealed by section 1 of, and part XI of the schedule to, the Statute Law (Repeals) Act 1974, which came into force on 27 June 1974.

The Armed Forces Act 1981 amended certain aspects of the act; most notably, it abolished the death penalty for the crime of espionage for the enemy on ships or in naval establishments. The Human Rights Act 1998 abolished the death penalty for all other capital crimes under the Act.

In 2004, courts martial in the Royal Navy were reformed by an order issued by the parliamentary Joint Committee on Human Rights. The committee found that the appointment of serving naval officers as Judge Advocates, and their appointment by the Chief Naval Judge Advocate (also a serving officer), undermined the independence and impartiality of courts martial, thereby contravening human rights legislation. The order instructed that all judge advocates should be appointed solely by the Judge Advocate of the Fleet, a civilian circuit judge.

The whole act was repealed by section 378(2) of, and schedule 17 to, the Armed Forces Act 2006, which came into force on 31 October 2009.
