= Colonial Naval Defence Act 1931 =

Act of the Parliament of the United Kingdom

Colonial Naval Defence Act 1931 (Note: Section 4(1).)
- Act of Parliament
- Parliament of the United Kingdom
- Long title: An Act to amend and consolidate the Colonial Naval Defence Acts, 1865 and 1909.
- Citation: 21 & 22 Geo. 5. c. 9
- Territorial extent: United Kingdom

Dates
- Royal assent: 3 March 1931
- Commencement: 3 March 1931 (Note: The Acts of Parliament (Commencement) Act 1793.)
- Repealed: 31 October 2009 (Note: The Armed Forces Act 2006 (Commencement No. 5) Order 2009.)
Other legislation
Amends	See § Repealed enactments
Repeals/revokes	See § Repealed enactments
Amended by	Colonial Naval Defence Act 1949; Naval Discipline Act 1957; Armed Forces Act 1981; Statute Law (Repeals) Act 1993
Repealed by	Armed Forces Act 2006

Status: Repealed

Text of statute as originally enacted

Revised text of statute as amended

The Colonial Naval Defence Act 1931 (21 & 22 Geo. 5. c. 9) was an act of the Parliament of the United Kingdom that amended and consolidated enactments related to colonial naval defence.

== Provisions ==
=== Repealed enactments ===
Section 4(2) of the act repealed 2 enactments, listed in that section.

Citation	Short title	Extent of repeal
28 & 29 Vict. c. 14	Colonial Naval Defence Act 1865	The whole act.
9 Edw. 7. c. 19	Colonial Naval Defence Act 1909	The whole act.

== Subsequent developments ==
The whole act was repealed by section 383(2) of, and schedule 17 to, the Armed Forces Act 2006 (2006 c. 52), which came into force for specified purposes on 28 March 2009 and for remaining provisions on 31 October 2009.
