= Visiting Forces Act =

Acts of the Parliament of the United Kingdom

Visiting Forces Act is a title often given to laws governing the status of military personnel while they are visiting areas under the jurisdiction of another country and/or while forces of one country are attached to or serving with forces of another country.

The law may also apply to some foreign non-military persons who are associated with visiting military forces (e.g., dependents, civilian employees, etc.). Such laws commonly address such issues as criminal jurisdiction, treatment of apprehended individuals found to be foreign military personnel who are absent without leave or military deserters, double jeopardy situations, etc. Individual laws enacted by individual governments may address such issues directly, or may act as enabling legislation so that separate visiting forces agreements between a host country and other countries may attain the force of law. Depending on the legislative climate in the host country, such enabling legislation may or may not be necessary.

== Specific countries ==
Following are some examples of laws relating to visiting forces in various countries:

=== Antigua and Barbuda ===
The Visiting Forces Act of 2007 would define the status of foreign forces visiting Antigua and Barbuda. Section 7 of that Act provides that a service court of a visiting force has the primary right to exercise jurisdiction in relation to an alleged commission by a member of the visiting force or a dependent of an offense in respect of (a) the property or security of the designated state; or (b) the person or property of another member of the visiting force or a dependent. This act is presently embodied in a bill is pending enactment.

=== Australia ===
The Defence (Visiting Forces) Act 1963 is an act to make provision with respect to naval, military and air forces of other countries visiting Australia, and for other purposes. Section 6 of this act specifies that it shall be read as a reference to: (a) any country declared by the regulations to be, for the purposes of this Act, a country within the Commonwealth of Nations; and (b) any other country declared under this section to be a country in relation to which that provision has effect. Section 5 of the Defence (Visiting Forces) Regulations 1963 specifies a list of specific countries with reference to which the Visiting Forces Act applies. Section 8 of the Visiting Forces Act specifies that the service tribunals and service authorities of a country in relation to which this section applies may, within Australia, or on board a ship or aircraft belonging to or in the service of the Defence Force or a part of the Defence Force, exercise over persons subject to their jurisdiction in accordance with this section all such powers as are exercisable by them in accordance with the law of that country.

=== Canada ===
The Visiting Forces Act (R.S., 1985, c. V-2) provides that the service authorities and service courts of a visiting force may exercise within Canada in relation to members of that force and dependents all the criminal and disciplinary jurisdiction that is conferred on them by the law of the designated state to which they belong.

=== Germany ===
The following agreements govern the presence of forces from NATO states stationed in Germany on the basis of an international treaty:

- the NATO Status of Forces Agreement (SOFA) of 19 June 1951 (Agreement between the Parties to the North Atlantic Treaty Regarding the Status of their Forces, Federal Law Gazette 1961 II p. 1190)
- the SOFA Supplementary Agreement of 3 August 1959 (Agreement to Supplement the Agreement between the Parties to the North Atlantic Treaty regarding the Status of their Forces with respect to Foreign Forces stationed in the Federal Republic of Germany, Federal Law Gazette 1961 II p. 1218)

=== Malaysia ===
In Malaysia, Act 432 is the Visiting Forces Act 1960 (Revised 1990).

=== New Zealand ===
In 2004, the New Zealand Parliament passed the Visiting Forces Act 2004, updating and replacing the Visiting Forces Act 1939.

=== Singapore ===
Singapore's Visiting Forces Act contains provisions for "the naval, military and air forces of certain other countries visiting Singapore, and for the apprehension and disposal of deserters or absentees without leave in Singapore from the forces of such countries and for matters connected therewith."

=== Trinidad and Tobago ===
In March 2007, the Senate and the House of Representatives passed legislation titled the Visiting Forces Act, 2007. Section 5 of the act extends immunity from the civil and criminal jurisdiction of Trinidad and Tobago in respect of actions taken in the course of their official duties.

=== United Kingdom ===
Visiting Forces (British Commonwealth) Act 1933 (Note: Section 9.)
- Act of Parliament
- Parliament of the United Kingdom
- Long title: An Act to make provision with respect to forces of His Majesty from other parts of the British Commonwealth when visiting the United Kingdom or a colony; with respect to the exercise of command and discipline when forces of His Majesty from different parts of the Commonwealth are serving together; with respect to the attachment of members of one such force to another such force, and with respect to deserters from such forces.
- Citation: 23 & 24 Geo. 5. c. 6
- Territorial extent: United Kingdom

Dates
- Royal assent: 29 March 1933
- Commencement: 29 March 1933 (Note: The Acts of Parliament (Commencement) Act 1793.)
Other legislation
Amended by	Newfoundland (Consequential Provisions) Act 1950; Visiting Forces Act 1952; Ghana Independence Act 1957; Federation of Malaya Independence Act 1957; South Africa Act 1962; Singapore Act 1966; Belize Act 1981; Armed Forces Act 2006

Status: Amended

Text of statute as originally enacted

Text of the Visiting Forces (British Commonwealth) Act 1933 as in force today (including any amendments) within the United Kingdom, from legislation.gov.uk.

The Visiting Forces (British Commonwealth) Act 1933 (23 & 24 Geo. 5. c. 6) was an act "to make provision with respect to forces of His Majesty from other parts of the British Commonwealth when visiting the United Kingdom or a colony; with respect to the exercise of command and discipline when forces of His Majesty from different parts of the Commonwealth are serving together; with respect to the attachment of members of one such force to another such force, and with respect to deserters from such forces."

During World War II, the Allied Forces Act 1940 (3 & 4 Geo. 6. c. 51) enabled visiting Allied forces to conduct courts martial, but did not provide immunity from ordinary criminal law. There was a single exception, as the United States of America (Visiting Forces) Act 1942 (10 & 11 Geo. 6. c. 31) gave members of the United States naval and military forces immunity in United Kingdom courts. That remained the position until the aforementioned acts were repealed by the Visiting Forces Act 1952 (15 & 16 Geo. 6 & 1 Eliz. 2. c. 67).

The Visiting Forces Act 1952 (15 & 16 Geo. 6 & 1 Eliz. 2. c. 67) was passed to incorporate the provisions of the NATO Status of Forces Agreement into United Kingdom law. SOFA provides a basis for a mutual and reciprocal system of exemptions, immunities and privileges for visiting forces when exercising or stationed in a host country. A major feature of SOFA, which is implemented by the 1952 act, is the question of jurisdiction for dealing with offences committed by visiting servicemen, civil servants accompanying a force, dependents and contractors. Its main provision is the agreement that the visiting force will retain jurisdiction for its people, which applies equally to United States personnel based in the United Kingdom and British forces serving in NATO countries, Commonwealth countries and, more recently, those countries that have signed up to the NATO partnership for peace. Usually, the service authorities for the visiting force member alleged to have committed an offence and the United Kingdom authorities will be able to agree which jurisdiction is appropriate to deal with the case. If agreement is not reached the decision as to jurisdiction will be referred to the Crown Prosecution Service. Where United Kingdom jurisdiction is appropriate the visiting forces case will normally be dealt with locally unless other criteria require the case to be dealt with by Crown Prosecution Service headquarters.

Section 1 of the Visiting Forces Act 1952 contains a list of countries to which the act applies. Subsection 2 of section 1, along with subsection 2 of section 15 provide the authority and a means for extending this list. The Visiting Forces (Designation) Order 1997 (SI 1997/1779) and the Visiting Forces (Designation) Order 1998 (SI 1998/1268) extended this list by designation additional countries.

==== Anguilla, the Cayman Islands, Montserrat and the Virgin Islands ====
Visiting Forces Act (Application to Colonies) (Amendment) Order 1990 (Note: Section 1(1).)
- Statutory Instrument
- Parliament of the United Kingdom
- Citation: SI 1990/24
- Territorial extent: United Kingdom

Dates
- Made: 14 February 1990
- Commencement: 14 February 1990 (Note: Section 1(40.)
Other legislation
Amends	Visiting Forces Act (Application to Colonies) Order 1954
Made under	Visiting Forces Act 1952

Status: Current legislation

Text of statute as originally enacted

The Visiting Forces Act (Application to Colonies) (Amendment) Order 1990 (SI 1990/24) extends the provisions of the British Visiting Forces Act 1952 to these territories.

==== Bermuda ====
Visiting Forces Act (Application to Bermuda) Order 2001
- Statutory Instrument
- Parliament of the United Kingdom
- Citation: SI 2001/3922
- Territorial extent: United Kingdom

Dates
- Made: 11 December 2001
- Commencement: (Note: Section 1(2).)
Other legislation
Amends	Visiting Forces Act (Application to Colonies) Order 1954
Made under	Visiting Forces Act 1952

Status: Current legislation

Text of statute as originally enacted

The Visiting Forces Act (Application to Bermuda) Order 2001 (SI 2001/3922) extends the provisions of the British Visiting Forces Act 1952 to Bermuda.

=== Vanuatu ===
On 14 August 1980, the Republic of Vanuatu enacted the Visiting Forces (Agreement) Act. This act gives separate Visiting Forces Agreements with Papua New Guinea and with the United Kingdom, and specified a protocol for extending those agreements.

== See also ==
- List of short titles
- Status of forces agreement
- Visiting forces agreement
