= Commonwealth Education Trust =

United Kingdom Charity

Commonwealth Institute
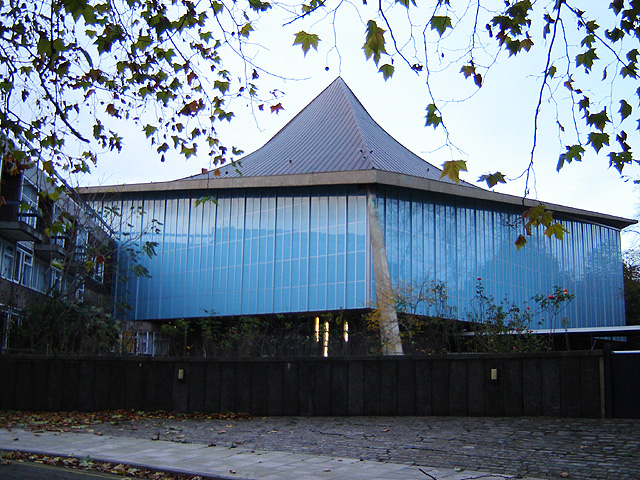
- The former Commonwealth Institute building on Kensington High Street, in November 2005

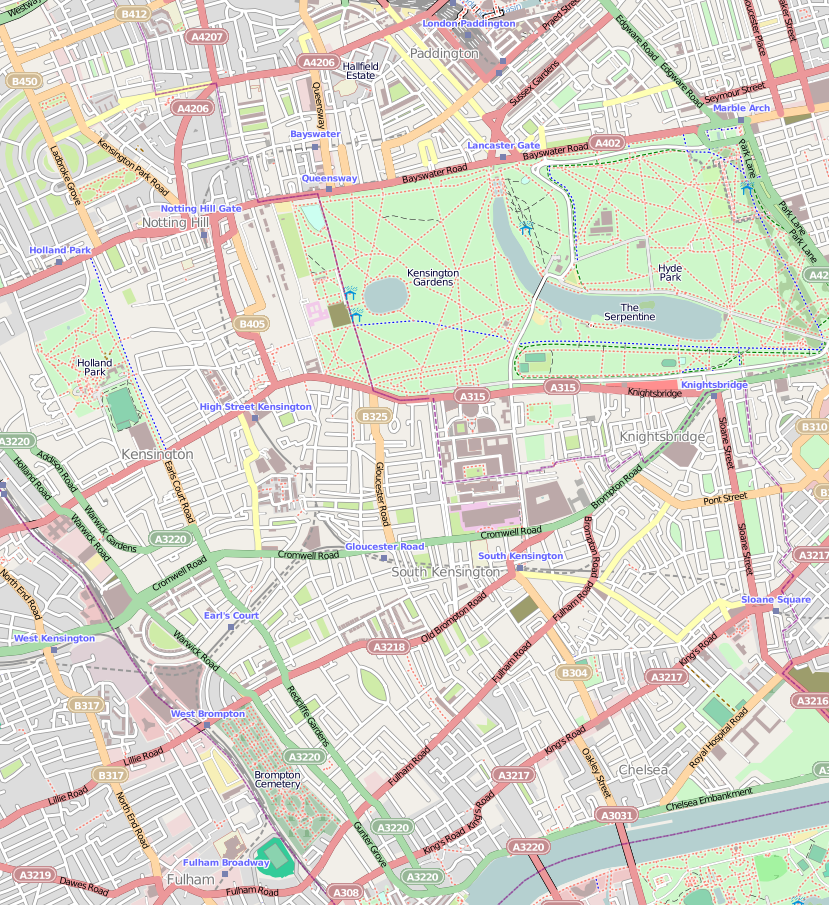
- Commonwealth Institute (Kensington) Commonwealth Institute (Greater London)
- Predecessor: Imperial Institute
- Successor: The Commonwealth Education Trust
- Established: 1888; 138 years ago (as Imperial Institute); 1958; 68 years ago (as Commonwealth Institute)
- Founded at: Kensington, London
- Dissolved: 2015; 11 years ago
- Type: Institute
- Purpose: Promoting the Commonwealth of Nations
- Headquarters: Imperial Institute Road (1893–1962); Kensington High Street (1962–2015)
- Coordinates: 51.49986°N 0.20018°W

The Commonwealth Education Trust was a registered charity established in 2007 as the successor trust to the Commonwealth Institute. The trust focuses on primary and secondary education and the training of teachers and invests on educational products and services to achieve both a beneficial and a financial reward to fund future charitable initiatives.

== History ==
The Commonwealth Institute was an educational and cultural organisation promoting the Commonwealth of Nations that was based in Kensington, London. It was established, as the Imperial Institute, by royal charter from Queen Victoria in 1888 on Imperial Institute Road (now Imperial College Road). Its name was changed to the Commonwealth Institute in 1958 and it moved to Kensington High Street in 1962. By statute, the operations were the responsibility of a minister of state from 1902 to 2003 and the property occupied for the purposes of the Institute, and of the same name, was held separately by Trustees as a charity asset. In 1999, prior to the end of the statutory regime, arrangements were made for both the property and the operations to be transferred to a company limited by guarantee also called the Commonwealth Institute. The members were the representatives to the United Kingdom of all countries of the Commonwealth, the Secretary of State for Foreign and Commonwealth Affairs on behalf of Her Majesty's Government (HMG), the Commonwealth Secretary-General, and four independent British citizens.

The organisation in corporate form proved not to be viable and in 2002 the members resolved to close the operations and sell the property which was too costly for the charity to maintain. Following this it was put into liquidation and the net proceeds were vested by the members of the company in a successor registered charity, The Commonwealth Education Trust is now based at New Zealand House in Central London. The property on Kensington High Street closed in 2004 and the name Commonwealth Institute is no longer associated with it. After an £80 million redevelopment the site became the home of the Design Museum, opening in late 2016.

=== The Imperial Institute ===
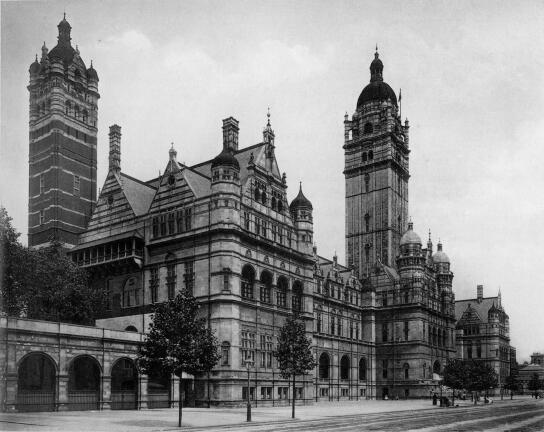
Imperial Institute, demolished 1957

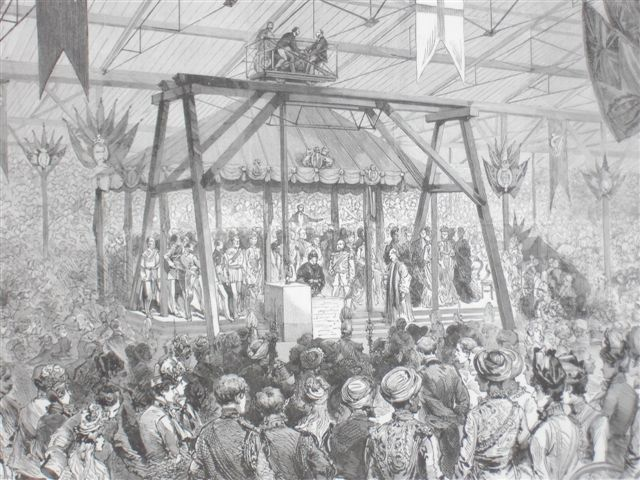
Arthur Sullivan conducts his Imperial Ode as Queen Victoria lays the foundation stone, 1887

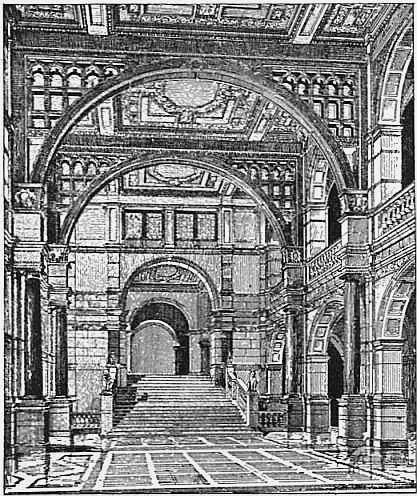
Imperial Institute architecture

The Imperial Institute (later largely incorporated into Imperial College London) was established in 1888 to hold and apply the property and assets arising from the contributions given almost exclusively by private citizens from across the Empire in a nationwide collection conceived by the then Prince of Wales in 1886 to celebrate the Golden Jubilee of Queen Victoria in 1887. No funding was given by Her Majesty's Government (HMG). It had defined purposes which had a primary emphasis on the exhibition of collections to showcase the various countries' industrial and commercial products and development; and included industrial intelligence gathering and dissemination; the promotion of technical and commercial education; and the furtherance of colonization.

The Imperial Institute building was opened in 1893 by Queen Victoria. The Institute's early activities are detailed in its journals. It had a department of commercial intelligence and an active scientific and practical research department from 1895 which was principally engaged in research that supported the industrial and commercial development of the natural products and resources of the dominions and colonies.

The building proved too large for the institute's needs and when HMG wished to find a home for the University of London, a transfer of leases was agreed in 1899 under which the institute assigned its 999-year lease (with the consent of the landlord) to the Commissioners of Works, who contemporaneously sub-let back to it approximately half of the building, free of rent and rates and with the benefit of various communal services including maintenance, heating and lighting. The transaction also included a capital payment and in later years was portrayed as a gratuitous act of rescue by HMG, however while the institute had an unencumbered property asset of such substance and value and the power under its charter to borrow on the security of such assets, it was not at risk financially.

Imperial Institute (Transfer) Act 1902
- Act of Parliament
- Parliament of the United Kingdom
- Long title: An Act to provide for placing the Imperial Institute under the management of the Board of Trade and for other purposes.
- Citation: 2 Edw. 7. c. cxxxix
- Territorial extent: United Kingdom

Dates
- Royal assent: 28 April 1902

Other legislation
- Amended by: Imperial Institute (Management) Act 1916
- Repealed by: Imperial Institute Act 1925; Commonwealth Institute Act 1958

Status: Repealed

The Board of Trade became interested in the commercial and industrial intelligence that had been developed by the institute, and advanced the view that the interests of both the government of the United Kingdom and the institute could be best served if the purposes of both bodies were merged, with an indispensable condition of the proposed transfer being that "the buildings and funds of the Imperial Institute must not be employed for the general purposes of the State". This was effected by the Imperial Institute (Transfer) Act 1902 (2 Edw. 7. c. cxxxix), with the then Prince of Wales remaining as president of the institute. The building and endowment fund set up from the initial collection were recognised as charity assets which were consequently vested in its trustees. With its president as trustee and also as the responsible minister, the Board of Trade was required to fulfil the purposes of the institute, which remained unchanged.

Imperial Institute (Management) Act 1916 (Note: Section 2.)
- Act of Parliament
- Parliament of the United Kingdom
- Long title: An Act to provide for transferring the Management of the Imperial Institute from the Board of Trade to the Colonial Office, and for other purposes connected therewith..
- Citation: 6 & 7 Geo. 5. c. 8
- Territorial extent: United Kingdom

Dates
- Royal assent: 19 April 1916
- Commencement: 19 April 1916 (Note: The Acts of Parliament (Commencement) Act 1793.)
- Repealed: 1 June 1925

Other legislation
- Amends: Imperial Institute (Transfer) Act 1902
- Repealed by: Imperial Institute Act 1925

Status: Repealed

Text of statute as originally enacted

Imperial Institute Act 1925 (Note: Section 10(1).)
- Act of Parliament
- Parliament of the United Kingdom
- Long title: An Act to amend the Law with respect to the Management of the Imperial Institute.
- Citation: 15 & 16 Geo. 5 c. xvii
- Territorial extent: United Kingdom

Dates
- Royal assent: 28 May 1925
- Commencement: 1 June 1925 (Note: Section 10(2).)

Other legislation
- Repeals/revokes: Imperial Institute (Transfer) Act 1902; Imperial Institute (Management) Act 1916
- Amended by: Imperial Institute (Variation of the Act of 1925) Order 1949; Transfer of Functions (Imperial Institute) Order 1949; Imperial Institute (Variation of the Act of 1925) Order 1953; Commonwealth Institute Act 1958; Commonwealth Institute (Board of Governors) Order 1959; Secretary of State for Education and Science Order 1964; Singapore Act 1966; Interpretation Act 1978; Extradition (Tokyo Convention) (Amendment) Order 1978; Kiribati Act 1979; Zimbabwe Act 1979; Saint Vincent Modification of Enactments Order 1979; Papua New Guinea, Western Samoa and Nauru (Miscellaneous Provisions) Act 1980; New Hebrides Act 1980; Zimbabwe (Independence and Membership of the Commonwealth) (Consequential Provisions) Order 1980; Belize Act 1981; Antigua and Barbuda Modification of Enactments Order 1981; Antigua and Barbuda Modification of Enactments Order 1981; Saint Christopher and Nevis Modification of Enactments Order 1983; Brunei and Maldives Act 1985; Pakistan Act 1990; Namibia Act 1991
- Repealed by: Commonwealth Act 2002

Status: Repealed

Text of statute as originally enacted

Revised text of statute as amended

Text of the Imperial Institute Act 1925 as in force today (including any amendments) within the United Kingdom, from legislation.gov.uk.

Departmental and ministerial responsibility was transferred to the Secretary of State for the Colonies by the Imperial Institute (Management) Act 1916 (6 & 7 Geo. 5. c. 8) to reflect the development of administrative responsibility that had occurred since 1907. More comprehensive changes were made with the Imperial Institute Act 1925 (15 & 16 Geo. 5 c. xvii) after a substantial enquiry into the activities of the institute, whose findings were considered at the Imperial Economic Conference of 1923. Its purposes were reconfigured with a change in prominence from the exhibition galleries, to the promotion of "the commercial industrial and educational interests of the British Empire".

Recommendations made by the Commonwealth Scientific Conference in 1946 and political changes influencing trade and resulting in the UK and 22 other countries signing the General Agreement on Tariffs and Trade, effective on 1 January 1948, led to the Treasury deciding to distribute the activities of the Institute. By the Transfer of Functions (Imperial Institute) Order 1949 and the Imperial Institute (Variation of the Act of 1925) Order 1949, the management of the institute was passed to the Department of Education and its purposes were redefined to retain responsibility for the galleries and its other educational work, but to have no further involvement in development and trade: a change in focus which made the work of the Institute less important for many of the member countries.

The Imperial Institute was housed in a substantial and architecturally noted building of the same name on Imperial Institute Road (now Imperial College Road), which ran between Exhibition Road and Queen's Gate in South Kensington, from 1893. The building was designed by Thomas Edward Collcutt and built by John Mowlem & Co from 1887 to 1894; and was paid for almost entirely by public subscription. Originally, it had three copper-roofed Renaissance-style towers, but a single 85-metre tower, Queen's Tower (only saved owing to public pressure and the objections of the Royal Fine Arts Commission), is all that remains of the Imperial Institute after demolition in the 1950s and 1960s to make way for the expansion of Imperial College.

Commonwealth Institute Act 1958 (Note: Section 7(1).)
- Act of Parliament
- Parliament of the United Kingdom
- Long title: An Act to amend the law with respect to the Imperial Institute.
- Citation: 6 & 7 Eliz. 2. c. 16
- Territorial extent: United Kingdom

Dates
- Royal assent: 13 March 1958
- Commencement: 13 March 1958
- Repealed: 7 January 2003

Other legislation
- Amends: Imperial Institute Act 1925
- Repeals/revokes: Imperial Institute (Transfer) Act 1902
- Amended by: Minister of Works (Change of Style and Title) Order 1962; Statute Law Revision Act 1963; Secretary of State for Education and Science Order 1964; Secretary of State for Commonwealth Affairs Order 1966; Transfer of Functions (Miscellaneous) Order 1967; Patents etc. (Argentina and Uruguay) (Convention) Order 1967; Secretary of State for Foreign and Commonwealth Affairs Order 1968; Secretary of State for the Environment Order 1970; Statute Law (Repeals) Act 1974; House of Commons Disqualification Act 1975; Secretaries of State for Education and Skills and for Work and Pensions Order 2002
- Repealed by: Commonwealth Act 2002

Status: Repealed

Text of statute as originally enacted

Revised text of statute as amended

Text of the Commonwealth Institute Act 1958 as in force today (including any amendments) within the United Kingdom, from legislation.gov.uk.

As the trustees of the Imperial Institute were required by the Imperial Institute Act 1925 to hold the institute buildings for the purposes of the act, it was determined that a new bill would be required to allow for the buildings to be demolished and the Imperial Institute to be rehoused. This was effected by the Commonwealth Institute Act 1958 (6 & 7 Eliz. 2. c. 16), which included a name change for the institute to the Commonwealth Institute, to recognise the political developments with the creation of the Commonwealth of Nations in 1949 and the increasing number of countries that had been granted independence and become members of the Commonwealth. At that time the responsible minister was the Minister of Education. The act also detailed the new site and parameters of size and cost for the new building; and stated that expenses incurred by the trustees relating to the conditions of the lease of other net expenses incurred by the Minister of Education in connection with the Commonwealth Institute were to be "paid out of moneys provided by Parliament". This reflected the arrangements made in 1899 under which the institute (then a royal charter company) was granted a fully repairing lease in exchange for releasing, at the request of the government, approximately one half of its building for the use of the University of London.

=== The Commonwealth Institute 1962–2015 ===
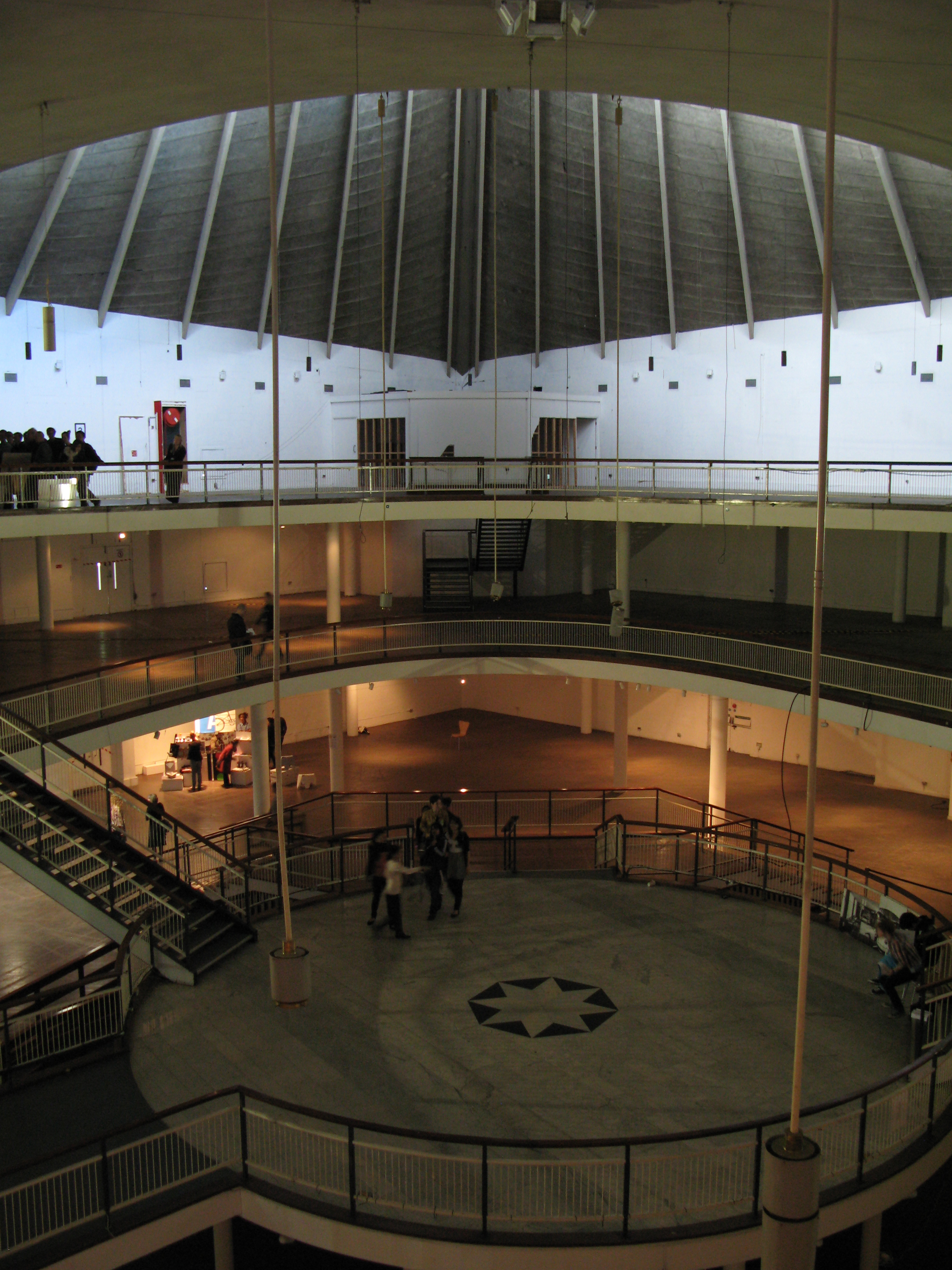
The interior in 2011

In 1962, the Commonwealth Institute moved to a distinctive copper-roofed building on Kensington High Street, immediately south of Holland Park. The building, designed by Robert Matthew Johnson-Marshall & Partners (RMJM), was opened on Tuesday, 6 November 1962, by Queen Elizabeth II. It was open to the public and contained a permanent exhibition about the nations of the Commonwealth, which was designed to inform the public "how the rest of the Commonwealth lives". The Commemorative Handbook for the occasion of the opening interpreted the Institute's purpose as "to foster the interests of the Commonwealth by information and education services designed to promote among all its people a wider knowledge of one another and a greater understanding of the Commonwealth itself". In addition to the exhibition, the Institute ran an important library of Commonwealth literature, and hosted cultural and educational events.

In 1967 responsibility for the operation of the Commonwealth Institute was transferred to the Secretary of State for Commonwealth Affairs, and then in 1968 to the Secretary of State for Foreign and Commonwealth Affairs (FCO). Various problems with the building had come to light since its completion, and in 1982 a total cost estimate of £312,000 was reported for recommended maintenance work, with the most important structural maintenance item being the waterproofing of the roof. Some work was approved, but the roof continued to leak, and by 1988 it was reported to the FCO that £700,000 was needed for the building to be structurally safe, with internal and essential modernisations being "likely to cost £5m". Later that year the building was given a Grade II* listing with associated restrictions on any building works or development possibilities. In 1989 a further estimate of £10m was given for more extensive refurbishment. With a background of high maintenance costs, the activities continued, but with an increasing emphasis on revenue generation, and various proposals were explored for commercial development of the site.

In 1993, the FCO announced that funding would cease completely in 1996 (the problem of the building being cited as a reason), although this deadline was extended until 1999. Responsibility of the work of the Institute and ownership of the building was transferred to a company, the members of which were all the countries of the Commonwealth (including the United Kingdom) and which was to be funded for three years by the United Kingdom. This failed to attract further funds, and in 2002 the countries decided it would cease its activities and the building would be sold. Funding of £3,996,435 was also provided for specified works to the building incorporating comprehensive repairs to the roof and some required access works. The arrangements also included an indemnity in favour of the Secretary of State for Foreign and Commonwealth Affairs as responsible Minister. The company continued as a charitable trust managed on behalf of the members: the High Commissioners to London of the Commonwealth Nations, the Secretary of State for Foreign and Commonwealth Affairs, and the four lay members. The statutes governing the Institute were not repealed until 2003 (with the Commonwealth Act 2002) at which time the remainder of the original Victorian endowment fund was also released to the company without restrictions.

By April 2002, the financial model of the Institute as a corporate entity had been recognised as "not sustainable". A revised plan was immediately put in place, and all funded activities were closed by the end of November. In a general meeting in late 2002, the members agreed to the disposal of the building and to the application of the proceeds (following the settlement of all obligations) to advancing education in the Commonwealth.

The institute held a large number of ethnographic objects and an art collection that had been acquired during the period from the opening of the Imperial Institute. From 1958 until 2003, these were under control of the responsible Minister under the legislation. Following the repeal of the legislation in 2003, some of the exhibits were returned to member countries; approximately 11,810 remaining items from the main areas of the collection (and more than 25,000 items from the secondary areas) were donated to the British Empire and Commonwealth Museum in Bristol, which itself closed in 2009, amid allegations of the unauthorized sale of a significant number of items from its collection. The remainder are now held under trust by the Bristol City Museum and Art Gallery. In July 2004, after a progressive run off period honouring advance bookings, the Conference and Events Centre closed. This venture had been the cornerstone of the 1999 business plan, but the maintenance and running costs of the building were high; additionally, by the time of closure the recently renovated roof had begun to leak persistently, and significant expenditure was required to comply with further health and safety requirements.

Various possibilities for the future of the building had been explored with advisers, including a public marketing campaign in March 2003. The complexity of dealing with the protected status of the building and the grounds affected the value and the terms on which the property could be sold. An application for the review of the listing was made in November 2004. This caused concern that it might lead to the demolition of the building. In the event, it resulted in a small but very important relaxation of the listing in respect of the administration wing of the building, which, when combined with a relaxation of use in relation to the frontage, meant that for the first time a viable development of the whole site could be envisaged. After creating a development plan that was favourably received by the local authority, the company finally achieved a sale in 2007, following which the Commonwealth Education Trust was formed as a successor charity, and the Commonwealth Institute was put into liquidation.

The professional fees for the complex processes leading to the sale of the building required to ensure that the trustees met their responsibilities: to optimize the value received; for ensuring the security of the pension arrangements; and providing full government service-level redundancy payments for the former staff, cost about £7m.

The liquidation proved to be long and complex, and was only completed in 2015 after a High Court hearing settled a number of uncertainties associated with the manner in which the assets had come into the hands of the company from the responsible Minister and the Commonwealth Institute Trustees prior to the repeal of the legislation in 2003.

== Commonwealth Poetry Award ==
Established in 1971 by the Commonwealth Institute and the National Book League, the Commonwealth Poetry Prize awarded £250 to "the best first volume of poetry (to be) published during the previous year by any writer from any Commonwealth country, except the United Kingdom."

== The building ==
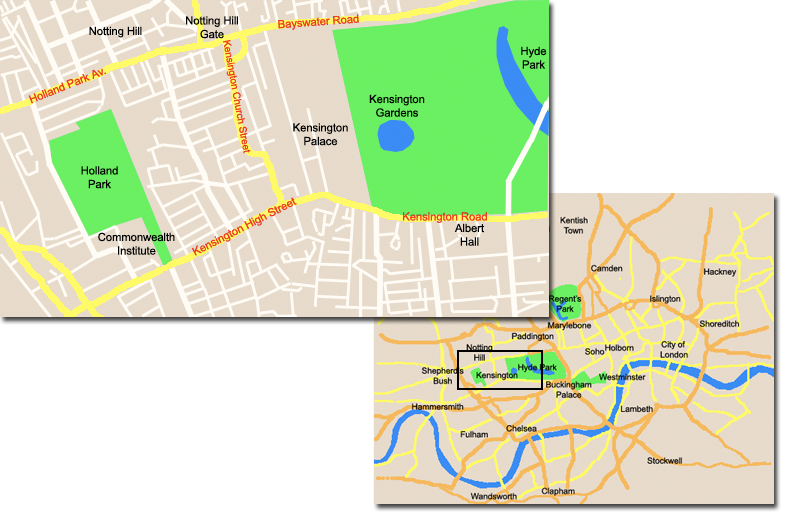
The location of The Commonwealth Institute

Built on a site of 3¼ acres with a frontage onto Kensington High Street of 125 feet (38 m), the total floor area of the building was 132,000 square feet (12,300 m^{2}) made up of an Exhibition Hall (60,000 sq ft), Administration block (47,500 sq ft), Art gallery and ancillary rooms (5000 sq ft), cinema, stage and dressing rooms (6000 sq ft) and basement workshops and storage (13,500 sq ft). The Commonwealth Institute was designed by Robert Matthew/Sir Robert Matthew, Johnson-Marshall and Partners, architects, and engineered by AJ & JD Harris, of Harris & Sutherland. Construction was started at the end of 1960 and completed in 1962.

The project was funded by the British government which was obliged to compensate the Trustees for the loss of the substantial Imperial Institute building (described by Louis Bondy as in the front rank of Victorian monumental architecture). Contributions of materials and grants from Commonwealth countries were sought to augment the small sum of money that the Exchequer had allowed for the new building. The exhibition designer was James Gardner, who worked on the Dome of Discovery in the influential Festival of Britain of 1951, and the gardens was designed by Sylvia Crowe. The contractor was John Laing Construction Ltd. The former Institute building stood on a piece of land acquired from the Holland estate on a 999-year lease for £215,000. The design of the building and gardens were strongly influenced by their proximity to Holland Park. The exterior and structure has been refurbished and the interior has been substantially altered to accommodate the Design Museum.

Regarded by English Heritage as the second most important modern building in London, after the Royal Festival Hall, the building had a low brickwork plinth clad in blue-grey glazing. Above this swooped the most striking feature of the building, the complex hyperbolic paraboloid copper roof, made with 25 tonnes of copper donated by the Northern Rhodesia Chamber of Mines. The concept of creating a 'tent in the park' has often been quoted as the inspiration for the shape of the roof, however, according to Roger Cunliffe (the job architect), while Stirrat Marshall-Johnson (the architect partner-in-charge) always saw the building as being 'in the park', there was no conception of 'tent', and the phrase followed form and did not determine it. Its unusual design proved problematic, and it was said to have leaked from the outset. Other design and construction faults emerged relatively soon after completion, which in part stemmed from the restricted budget, and the building proved very costly to run and maintain. The gardens incorporated a large water feature, grass lawns, and a flagpole for each member of the Commonwealth. The interior of the building consisted of a dramatic open space, covered in a tent-like concrete shell, with tiered exhibition spaces linked by walkways. The diagonal, diamond-shaped exhibition block was clearly different from the rectangular administration wing and the junction of the exhibition and administration blocks created a considerable design problem.

The Art Gallery measured 95x44 feet and relied primarily on natural lighting. A large picture window facing the park was included to postpone the desire for escape that the four solid walls of many art galleries quickly engender. The fragility of the structure however limited the weight of exhibits. The cinema beneath the art gallery was designed for daily showings of Commonwealth news and interest films but was adaptable for other purposes. It seated 450 and could be used as a lecture hall, and had a workshop stage and stage lighting for the staging of theatre productions. The building was listed Grade II* in 1988 for its roof, its place as a post-war building, its importance in the history of museum and exhibition design, and its historical significance in marking the transition from Empire to Commonwealth. The Sylvia Crowe landscape was entered in the Register of Historic Parks and Gardens in July 1998, but following the sale of the building it was removed. On 22 July 2005 the Secretary of State for Culture, Media and Sport, Tessa Jowell, rejected a proposal to remove the building's listed status, considered as an obstacle to realising the full potential of the Trust's assets in a report by property consultants to the Commonwealth Institute Trustees. In April 2007, the Commonwealth Institute building was acquired by property developers Chelsfield Partners. A planning brief, issued by the local council in August 2007, called for the preservation of the main structure of the building, preferably for use such as an art gallery that would retain its essential components. The brief also called for greater integration of the gardens with Holland Park.

Plans for redevelopment of the site were drawn up by Rem Koolhaas' architectural practice OMA, and submitted for planning permission to the Royal Borough of Kensington and Chelsea in April 2009. They included construction of three six- to nine-story residential buildings, replacing the former Administration wing, and large-scale internal modifications to the interior of the main structure, to enable its use by the Design Museum. After criticism by local residents' groups and The Twentieth Century Society – relating both to the impact of the new buildings on the local streetscape and to the skyline of Holland Park, and to the large scale of the internal modifications to the existing structure – revised plans were submitted in August 2009. The new blocks were to be lower in height, with fewer internal modifications to the existing structure.

The revised proposal was approved by the Council on 17 September 2009, and by English Heritage on 25 September 2009. The architect John Pawson was to be responsible for the conversion of the Exhibition Hall to provide a new home for the Design Museum. It was confirmed in January 2012 that the Design Museum would move to the building with an £80 million makeover. The museum opened in its new venue on 24 November 2016.

== Notable people ==
- Madan Lal Dhingra (1883—1909), an Indian revolutionary, pro-independence activist, who, while studying in England, assassinated a British colonial officer William Hutt Curzon Wyllie, Dhingra was hanged at HM Prison Pentonville, denied Hindu rites and buried by the British authorities. Winston Churchill privately acknowledged Dhingra's statement "[t]he Finest ever made in the name of Patriotism".
- Sir Kenneth Bradley (1904-1977), served as district and information officer in Northern Rhodesia (Zambia) 1926-42, colonial secretary of the Falkland Islands 1942-45 and under-secretary of Gold Coast [Ghana] 1945-48; in 1953 he became Director of the Commonwealth Institute and supervised the new building in Holland Park, which opened in 1962
- Sophia Braeunlich (1854–1898), business manager, journalist; first American woman elected a fellow of the Imperial Institute
