= Colonial Naval Defence Act 1865 =

Act of the Parliament of the United Kingdom

Colonial Naval Defence Act 1865 (Note: Section 1.)
- Act of Parliament
- Parliament of the United Kingdom
- Long title: An Act to make better Provision for the Naval Defence of the Colonies.
- Citation: 28 & 29 Vict. c. 14
- Territorial extent: British Empire (Note: Section 2.)

Dates
- Royal assent: 7 April 1865
- Commencement: 7 April 1865 (Note: The Acts of Parliament (Commencement) Act 1793.)
- Repealed: 3 March 1931
Other legislation
Amended by	Colonial Naval Defence Act 1909
Repealed by	Colonial Naval Defence Act 1931

Status: Repealed

Text of statute as originally enacted

The Colonial Naval Defence Act 1865 (28 & 29 Vict. c. 14) was an act of the Parliament of the United Kingdom.

== Background ==
During the Invasion of the Waikato (July 1863 – April 1864) period of the New Zealand Wars the Imperial British forces realised they needed access to colonial ships to fight Māori. The colonial government acquired vessels which were staffed by Royal Navy officers but owned by the colonial government. The vessels were under local and not Admiralty control. An armed ship, HMVS Victoria, owned by the Colony of Victoria transported troops to New Zealand for the campaign and took part in bombardments of Māori. The British government was concerned about its colonies developing their own navies, not under the control of the Royal Navy's Admiralty.

This led to the British parliament passing the Colonial Naval Defence Act 1865, which allowed the colonial governments to own ships, including for military purposes, but they would have to be under the Royal Navy's command.

== Flags ==
The Blue Ensign.

In 1866 the British Admiralty advised colonies that if they possessed vessels governed by the act, they must fly the Royal Navy Blue Ensign but that they must also include on the flag the seal or badge of the colony.

New Zealand did not have a colonial badge, or indeed a coat of arms of its own at this stage, and so in 1867 the letters "NZ" were simply added to the blue ensign, following a decree by Governor George Grey on 15 January 1867.

== Subsequent developments ==
The whole act was repealed by section 4(2) of the Colonial Naval Defence Act 1931 (21 & 22 Geo. 5. c. 9), which came into force on 3 March 1931.

== See also ==
- Historical flags of the British Empire and the overseas territories
- Blue Ensign

== Bibliography ==
- Malcolm Mulholland (2016). "New Zealand Flag Facts" (PDF). New Zealand Flag Consideration Panel.
