= Diplomatic Immunities (Conferences with Commonwealth Countries and Republic of Ireland) Act 1961 =

Act of the Parliament of the United Kingdom

Diplomatic Immunities (Conferences with Commonwealth Countries and Republic of Ireland) Act 1961 (Note: Section 3(1).)
- Act of Parliament
- Parliament of the United Kingdom
- Long title: An Act to provide for conferring certain immunities on representatives of Governments of Commonwealth countries and the Republic of Ireland attending conferences in the United Kingdom and on their staffs.
- Citation: 9 & 10 Eliz. 2. c. 11
- Territorial extent: United Kingdom (Note: Section 3(2).)

Dates
- Royal assent: 2 March 1961
- Commencement: 2 March 1961 (Note: The Acts of Parliament (Commencement) Act 1793.)
- Repealed: 15 April 1981
Other legislation
Amended by	Singapore Act 1966
Repealed by	International Organisations Act 1981

Status: Repealed

Text of statute as originally enacted

The Diplomatic Immunities (Conferences with Commonwealth Countries and Republic of Ireland) Act 1961 (9 & 10 Eliz. 2. c. 11) was an act of the Parliament of the United Kingdom that extended diplomatic immunity to representatives of British Dominions and the Republic of Ireland. It was repealed by the International Organisations Act 1981.

== Provisions ==
The act extends to representatives of the British Commonwealth and the Republic of Ireland the same diplomatic rights as those of representatives of other foreign states. Those representatives on official business have immunity from prosecution within British courts and any other immunity "granted by any enactment and rule of law or custom" to foreign representatives, and the same right is extended to those members of their staff who are citizens of a foreign nation. Those members of staff who are British are entitled only to immunity for "things done or omitted to be done in the course of the performance of their duties".

== Bibliography ==
- Thornberry, Cedric (1962). "The Diplomatic Immunities Act, 1961. The Department of Technical Co-operation Act, 1961. The European Free Trade Association Act, 1960". Modern Law Review. 25 (1). Blackwell Publishing. ISSN 0026-7961.
