= Visiting Forces Act 1952 =

Act of the Parliament of the United Kingdom

Visiting Forces Act 1952 (Note: Section 19.)
- Act of Parliament
- Parliament of the United Kingdom
- Long title: An Act to make provision with respect to naval, military and air forces of certain other countries visiting the United Kingdom, and to provide for the apprehension and disposal of deserters or absentees without leave in the United Kingdom from the forces of such countries; to enable corresponding provision to be made in the law of colonies and dependencies; and for purposes connected with the matters aforesaid.
- Citation: 15 & 16 Geo. 6 & 1 Eliz. 2. c. 67
- Territorial extent: United Kingdom

Dates
- Royal assent: 30 October 1952
- Commencement: 12 June 1954 (Note: Section 19(2). The Visiting Forces Act, 1952 (Commencement) Order 1954.)

Other legislation
- Amends: Visiting Forces (British Commonwealth) Act 1933
- Repeals/revokes: Allied Forces Act 1940
- Amended by: Sexual Offences Act 1956; Ghana Independence Act 1957; Federation of Malaya Independence Act 1957; International Headquarters and Defence Organisations Act 1964; Singapore Act 1966; Theft Act 1968; Statute Law (Repeals) Act 1974; Belize Act 1981; Protection of Children Act 1978; Child Abduction Act 1984

Status: Amended

Text of statute as originally enacted

Revised text of statute as amended

Text of the Visiting Forces Act 1952 as in force today (including any amendments) within the United Kingdom, from legislation.gov.uk.

The Visiting Forces Act 1952 (15 & 16 Geo. 6 & 1 Eliz. 2. c. 67) is an act of the Parliament of the United Kingdom.

Section 3 provides immunity against prosecution for certain offences in the courts of United Kingdom by members of visiting forces and, by virtue of the International Headquarters and Defence Organisations Act 1964, international headquarters. See offence against the person and offence against property for the meaning of those terms.

The act is extended by section 1(2) of, and the schedule to the International Headquarters and Defence Organisations Act 1964.

== Extent ==
The act applies specifically to the forces of the countries (mostly members of the Commonwealth of Nations) listed in s.1(1)(a) (as amended from time to time) and additionally to the forces of any other country authorised by an Order in Council.

The act is in force throughout the United Kingdom.

== Subsequent developments ==
Section 18 of the act was repealed by section 1 of, and part XI of the schedule to, the Statute Law (Repeals) Act 1974, which came into force on 27 June 1974.
