= Merchant Shipping Act 1854 =

Act of the Parliament of the United Kingdom

Merchant Shipping Act 1854 (Note: Section 1.)
- Act of Parliament
- Parliament of the United Kingdom
- Long title: An Act to amend and consolidate the Acts relating to Merchant Shipping.
- Citation: 17 & 18 Vict. c. 104
- Territorial extent: United Kingdom

Dates
- Royal assent: 10 August 1854
- Commencement: 1 May 1855 (Note: Section 3.)
- Repealed: 1 January 1895
Other legislation
Amended by	Merchant Shipping Act Amendment Act 1855; Admiralty Court Act 1861; Merchant Shipping Act Amendment Act 1862; Merchant Shipping Act 1867; Births and Deaths Registration Act 1874; Statute Law Revision Act 1878; Merchant Shipping (Fees and Expenses) Act 1880; Riot (Damages) Act 1886
Repealed by	Merchant Shipping Act 1894
Relates to	Merchant Shipping Repeal Act 1854

Status: Repealed

Text of statute as originally enacted

The Merchant Shipping Act 1854 (17 & 18 Vict. c. 104), also known as the Imperial Shipping Act 1854, was an act of the Parliament of the United Kingdom. It was passed on 10 August 1854, together with the Merchant Shipping Repeal Act 1854 (c. 120), which together repealed several centuries of preceding maritime legislation.

It introduced the keeping of official numbers for registered ships, and revised calculations of tonnage. It also changed the management of lighthouses in Scotland and neighbouring islands, vesting it in the Northern Lighthouse Board which was one of the general lighthouse authorities the act created. It also (indirectly) created the Sea Gallantry Medal, the only UK state honour created by act of Parliament, rather than royal warrant.

== Subsequent developments ==
The whole act was repealed by section 745 of, and the twenty-second schedule to, the Merchant Shipping Act 1894 (57 & 58 Vict. c. 60), which came into force on 1 January 1895.

In January 2007, after looting of the cargo of the container ship, the MSC Napoli, acting Receiver of Wreck Mark Rodaway said he would invoke powers of this act for the first time in 100 years, although the extant powers to which he referred are actually held under the more recent, replacement, legislation.

== See also ==
- Merchant Shipping Act

== Bibliography ==
- Research guide: Ship Registration AC.uk
- Lighthouses on the Isle of Man, Isle-of-man.com
- Merchant Shipping Act, 1854
