= Merchant Shipping (Scottish Fishing Boats) Act 1920 =

Act of the Parliament of the United Kingdom

Merchant Shipping (Scottish Fishing Boats) Act 1920 (Note: Section 2(1).)
- Act of Parliament
- Parliament of the United Kingdom
- Long title: An Act to provide for the extension to Scotland of Part IV of the Merchant Shipping Act, 1894.
- Citation: 10 & 11 Geo. 5. c. 39
- Territorial extent: United Kingdom

Dates
- Royal assent: 16 August 1920
- Commencement: 1 October 1920 (Note: Section 2(2).)
- Repealed: 1 January 1996
Other legislation
Amends	Merchant Shipping Act 1894
Repealed by	Merchant Shipping Act 1995

Status: Repealed

Text of statute as originally enacted

Revised text of statute as amended

The Merchant Shipping (Scottish Fishing Boats) Act 1920 (10 & 11 Geo. 5. c. 39) was an act of the Parliament of the United Kingdom concerning fishing in Scotland. It became law on 16 August 1920.

It provided that part IV of the Merchant Shipping Act 1894 (57 & 58 Vict. c. 60) would apply to Scotland.

== Subsequent developments ==
The whole act was repealed by section 314(1) of, and schedule 7 to, the Merchant Shipping Act 1995, which came into force on 1 January 1996.

== See also ==
- Merchant Shipping Act
