= Receiver of Wreck =

Official who administers law dealing with maritime wrecks and salvage

The Receiver of Wreck is an official who administers law dealing with maritime wrecks and salvage in some countries having a British administrative heritage. In the United Kingdom, the Receiver of Wreck is also appointed to retain the possession of royal fish on behalf of the British crown.

== Countries having a Receiver of Wreck ==
In the United Kingdom, the Receiver of Wreck, a post defined under the Merchant Shipping Act 1995, is an official of the British Government whose main task is to administer the law in relation to Wreck and Salvage. Operating on behalf of the Department for Transport, the Receiver of Wreck is located within the Maritime and Coastguard Agency. Until 1993, the role was carried out by numerous coastal customs officials. Nowadays, the Receiver is based in Southampton, and is helped by local outposts of His Majesty's Coastguard.

The UK post holder as of January 2026 is Stephen White.

In Cornwall the receiver of wreck and royal fish is the Receiver General of the Duchy of Cornwall, a role previously fulfilled by the Havener of Cornwall.

Elsewhere in the British Isles, each of the Channel Islands, and the Isle of Man have its own laws of wreck and salvage and their own Receiver of Wreck.

In Ireland a Receiver of Wreck is a Revenue Official appointed by the Minister for Transport, Tourism and Sport with the consent of the Revenue Commissioners whose duty is to deal with any wreck found in or on the shores of the sea or any tidal water or harbour.

Canada has a Receiver of Wreck, continued under Part 4 of the Wrecked, Abandoned or Hazardous Vessels Act. Transport Canada is responsible for administering this program.

== History ==
Traditionally, salvage was an important economic source in coastal areas and sometimes exposed the savage and merciless nature of those around the coast. Folklore has it that some coastal dwellers enticed ships to a watery grave by luring them onto the rocks. This was known as wrecking. So that order could be maintained and local people encouraged to save those in peril and their belongings rather than pillage them, receivers of wreck were appointed to keep order and reward those who assisted in a wreck event. Historically, receivers were given powers which allowed them to "hurt, maim or kill" anyone obstructing them in their duties. Theoretically at least, receivers of wreck were permitted to carry weapons with which to defend themselves whilst carrying out their duties up until 1997.

The act of 1995 updates the prior Merchant Shipping Act 1894 (57 & 58 Vict. c. 60). The receiver is an official under Admiralty Jurisdiction.

== Role of the Receiver of Wreck ==
The main task of the Receiver of Wreck is to process reports of wreck, in the interest of both finder and owner. This involves researching ownership and working with the finder, owner, archaeologists, museums, and other interested parties. The process of reporting wreck provides legal owners the opportunity to be reunited with their property and to ensure that law-abiding finders of wreck receive appropriate recognition in the form of a salvage award.

The Maritime and Coastguard Agency administers Section 2 of the Protection of Wrecks Act 1973, which protects wrecks that are deemed dangerous by virtue of their contents. There is a strict no entry policy. This is in the interest of safety of both divers and members of the public. Two wrecks are protected under Section 2 of the Act: the SS Richard Montgomery and the SS Castilian, which are both from the Second World War and contain dangerous quantities of explosives.

The Receiver of Wreck also undertakes the task of disposing of "royal fish" in England, Wales and Northern Ireland, but not in Cornwall or Scotland. "Royal fish" are dead whales, dolphins, porpoises and sturgeon. This is an ancient right dating back to Edward II's reign which falls under the royal prerogative.

== What is wreck? ==
The Receiver of Wreck's remit is set down in the Merchant Shipping Act 1995, Part IX, Chapters 1-2. It covers wreck from UK territorial waters (within 12 nautical miles), and wreck landed in the UK from outside UK territorial waters. Wreck material includes any part of a vessel, aircraft or hovercraft including any of its cargo or equipment.

According to section 255 of the Merchant Shipping Act 1995, wreck includes "jetsam, flotsam, lagan or derelict". The Act does not define these terms, but they may be understood as follows:

- Flotsam are goods lost from a ship which has sunk or otherwise perished which are recoverable because they have floated.
- Jetsam are goods cast overboard (jettisoned) in order to lighten a vessel which is in danger of sinking, even if they ultimately perish.
- Derelict is property which has been abandoned and deserted at sea by those who were in charge without any hope of recovering it. This includes vessels and cargo.
- Lagan (or ligan) are goods cast overboard from a ship, buoyed so that they can be recovered later.

Boats that have come off their moorings are not normally classified as wreck as they have not been abandoned without hope of recovery. Also, buoys including marker buoys, mooring buoys etc., other than those that are fishing equipment, are not normally classed as wreck.

== UK wreck law ==
It is a legal requirement under the Merchant Shipping Act 1995 that all recovered wreck material landed in the United Kingdom must be reported to the Receiver of Wreck, whether recovered from within or outside UK waters and even if the finder is the owner. All wreck material recovered must be reported, however small or insignificant it may seem.

The Receiver of Wreck will investigate ownership of the recovered items. The owner has one year, after the material has been reported, in which to come forward and prove title to the property. During this period it is common for the finder to hold the wreck on behalf of the Receiver of Wreck while investigations are carried out. Finders should assume that all wreck items have an owner. It is possible for wreck material to be owned by an individual, a company, a dive club, an insurance company, the Ministry of Defence or the Department for Transport.

Wreck from UK waters which is still unclaimed at the end of one year becomes the property of the Crown (or grantee of the Crown such as the Duchy of Cornwall). Any person who believes that they are entitled to unclaimed wreck must provide evidence of entitlement to the satisfaction of the Receiver. If wreck from UK territorial waters is unclaimed at the end of one year, the Receiver will dispose of the find on behalf of the Crown. If wreck from outside UK territorial waters is unclaimed at the end of one year, the Crown makes no claim, and the material is returned to the finder. Often the finder is allowed to keep items of unclaimed wreck in lieu of a salvage award.

Wreck and Salvage in the UK is covered by three main Acts. These are the Merchant Shipping Act 1995, the Protection of Wrecks Act 1973 and the Protection of Military Remains Act 1986. In simple terms, the Protection of Wrecks Act 1973 and the Protection of Military Remains Act 1986 detail what salvors cannot do, and the Merchant Shipping Act 1995 covers what salvors can or must do.

For a complete list of wrecks protected under the Protection of Wrecks Act 1973, see List of designations under the Protection of Wrecks Act.

Wreck can be reported to the Receiver by completing a Report of Wreck and Salvage Form, known as a Droit.

== Penalties ==
There are several penalties associated with wreck and salvage outlined in the Merchant Shipping Act 1995 and the Receiver has a duty to investigate any report of possible offences regarding the treatment of wreck. If the investigation reveals sufficient evidence, the Receiver may prosecute those suspected of having committed an offence. To enable the Receiver of Wreck to enforce the law the Receiver is awarded several powers by the Secretary of State.

== In popular culture ==
- The Receiver of Wreck was mentioned by Hammond Innes in the novel (and film based on the novel) The Wreck of the Mary Deare.
- Show of Hands, an English folk band, sing about the Receiver of Wreck in the song "The Napoli". This was inspired by the wreck of the MSC Napoli, which was grounded in Branscombe Bay and subsequently lost many containers which were washed up on the beach, before being rifled through by people flocking to the small village.

== See also ==
- His Majesty's Coastguard
- Maritime disasters
- Merchant Shipping Act, list of
- Merchant Shipping Act 1995
- Protection of Military Remains Act 1986
- Protection of Wrecks Act 1973
- Royal fish
- Underwater archaeology
- Wreck diving
