= Merchant Shipping Act =

Stock short title used for legislation

Merchant Shipping Act (with its variations) is a stock short title used in Malaysia and the United Kingdom for legislation relating to merchant shipping.

Merchant shipping acts and regulations also exist as well in other countries, and they are sometimes referred to as "Merchant Shipping Act" such as in Malta, India, Singapore, Kenya and South Africa. Each country has its specific rules regarding merchant shipping.

== List ==
=== Malaysia ===
- Merchant Shipping (Oil Pollution) Act 1994

=== United Kingdom ===
- Merchant Shipping Act 1786 (26 Geo. 3. c. 86)
- Merchant Shipping Act 1844 (7 & 8 Vict. c. 112)
- Merchant Shipping Law Amendment Act 1853 (16 & 17 Vict. c. 131)
- Merchant Shipping Repeal Act 1854 (17 & 18 Vict. c. 120)
- Merchant Shipping Act 1854 (17 & 18 Vict. c. 104)
- Merchant Shipping Act 1876 (39 & 40 Vict. c. 80)
- Merchant Shipping Act 1894 (57 & 58 Vict. c. 60)
- Merchant Shipping Act 1897 (60 & 61 Vict. c. 59)
- Merchant Shipping (Exemption from Pilotage) Act 1897 (60 & 61 Vict. c 61)
- Merchant Shipping (Liability of Shipowners) Act 1898 (61 & 62 Vict. c 14)
- Merchant Shipping (Mercantile Marine Fund) 1898 (61 & 62 Vict. c. 44)
- Merchant Shipping (Liability of Shipowners and others) Act 1900 (63 & 64 Vict. c. 32)
- Merchant Shipping Act 1906 (6 Edw. 7. c. 48)
- Merchant Shipping (Amendment) Act 1920 (10 & 11 Geo. 5. c. 2)
- Merchant Shipping (Scottish Fishing Boats) Act 1920 (10 & 11 Geo. 5. c. 39)
- Merchant Shipping Act 1921 (11 & 12 Geo. 5. c. 28)
- Merchant Shipping (Equivalent Provisions) Act 1925 (15 & 16 Geo. 5. c. 37)
- Merchant Shipping (International Labour Conventions) Act 1925 (15 & 16 Geo. 5. c. 42)
- Merchant Shipping (Safety and Load Line Conventions) Act 1932 (22 & 23 Geo. 5. c. 9)
- Merchant Shipping (Carriage of Munitions to Spain) Act 1936
- Merchant Shipping Act 1948 (11 & 12 Geo. 6. c. 44)
- Merchant Shipping (Safety Convention) Act 1949 (12, 13 & 14 Geo. 6. c. 43)
- Merchant Shipping Act 1950 (14 Geo. 6. c. 9)
- Merchant Shipping (Liability of Shipowners and Others) Act 1958 (6 & 7 Eliz. 2. c. 62)
- Merchant Shipping Act 1964 (c. 47)
- Merchant Shipping Act 1965 (c. 47)
- Merchant Shipping (Load Lines) Act 1967 (c. 27)
- Fishing Vessels (Safety Provisions) Act 1970 (c. 27)
- Merchant Shipping Act 1970 (c. 36)
- Merchant Shipping (Oil Pollution) Act 1971 (c. 59)
- Merchant Shipping Act 1974 (c. 43)
- Merchant Shipping (Safety Convention) Act 1977 (c. 24)
- Merchant Shipping Act 1979 (c. 39)
- Merchant Shipping Act 1981 (c. 10)
- Merchant Shipping (Liner Conferences) Act 1982 (c. 37)
- Merchant Shipping Act 1983 (c. 13)
- Merchant Shipping Act 1984 (c. 5)
- Merchant Shipping Act 1985
- Safety at Sea Act 1986 (c. 23)
- Merchant Shipping Act 1988 (c. 12)
- Merchant Shipping (Registration, etc.) Act 1993 (c. 22)
- Merchant Shipping (Salvage and Pollution) Act 1994 (c. 28)
- Merchant Shipping Act 1995 (c. 21)
- Merchant Shipping and Maritime Security Act 1997 (c. 28)
- Merchant Shipping (Pollution) Act 2006 (c. 8)

The Merchant Shipping Act 1894 (57 & 58 Vict. c. 60) consolidated a large number of previous merchant shipping laws into a single, large act.

Laws it repealed included:

- Foreign Deserters Act 1852
- Passengers Act Amendment Act 1853
- Merchant Shipping Act 1854 (17 & 18 Vict. c. 104)
- Merchant Shipping Act 1855
- Passengers Act 1855 (18 & 19 Vict. c. 104)
- Seamen's Savings Bank Act 1856
- Australian Passengers Act 1861
- Merchant Shipping Amendment Act 1862
- Passengers Act Amendment Act 1863 (26 & 27 Vict. c. 51)
- Colonial Shipping Act 1868
- Merchant Shipping (Colonial) Act 1869
- Passengers Act (Amendment) Act 1870
- Merchant Shipping Act 1871
- Merchant Shipping Act 1873
- Local Light Dues Reduction Act 1876
- Merchant Shipping Act 1876
- Removal of Wreck Act 1877
- Shipping Casualties Investigation Act 1879
- Merchant Shipping Act (1854) Amendment Act 1880
- Merchant Shipping (Carriage of Grain) Act 1880
- Merchant Shipping (Colonial Inquiries) Act 1882
- Merchant Shipping (Fishing Boats) Act 1883
- Merchant Shipping (Fishing Boats) Act, 1887
- Merchant Shipping (Miscellaneous) Act 1887
- Merchant Shipping (Life Saving Appliances) Act 1888
- Removal of Wreck Act, 1877, Amendment Act 1889
- Passenger Acts Amendment Act 1889
- Merchant Shipping (Tonnage) Act 1889
- Merchant Shipping Act 1889
- Merchant Shipping (Pilotage) Act 1889 (52 & 53 Vict. c. 68)
- Merchant Shipping (Colours) Act 1889
- Merchant Shipping Act 1890
- Merchant Shipping Act 1892

==== Merchant Shipping (Liability of Shipowners and others) Act 1900 ====
Merchant Shipping (Liability of Shipowners and others) Act 1900 (Note: Section 4.)
- Act of Parliament
- Parliament of the United Kingdom
- Long title: An Act to amend the Merchant Shipping Act, 1894, with respect to the Liability of Shipowners and others.
- Citation: 63 & 64 Vict. c. 32
- Territorial extent: United Kingdom

Dates
- Royal assent: 6 August 1900
- Commencement: 6 August 1900 (Note: The Acts of Parliament (Commencement) Act 1793.)
Other legislation
Amends	Merchant Shipping Act 1894
Amended by	Merchant Shipping (Liability of Shipowners and Others) Act 1958; Merchant Shipping Act 1995

Status: Amended

Text of statute as originally enacted

Revised text of statute as amended

Text of the Merchant Shipping (Liability of Shipowners and others) Act 1900 as in force today (including any amendments) within the United Kingdom, from legislation.gov.uk.

The Merchant Shipping (Liability of Shipowners and others) Act 1900 (63 & 64 Vict. c. 32) introduced new rules relating to the liability of shipowners and the liability of harbour conservation authorities. The section on liability of shipowners was superseded by the Merchant Shipping (Liability of Shipowners and Others) Act 1958, but the other sections remain in force.

==== "The Merchant Shipping Acts" ====
Each Merchant Shipping Act defines a collective title beginning "Merchant Shipping Acts", including itself and other acts whose short titles include "Merchant Shipping"; for example "The Merchant Shipping Acts 1894 to 1994". The earliest act included is always the Merchant Shipping Act 1894.

== See also ==
- List of short titles
