= Merchant Shipping Act 1995 =

Act of the Parliament of the United Kingdom

Merchant Shipping Act 1995 (Note: Section 316(1).)
- Act of Parliament
- Parliament of the United Kingdom
- Long title: An Act to consolidate the Merchant Shipping Acts 1894 to 1994 and other enactments relating to merchant shipping.
- Citation: 1995 c. 21
- Territorial extent: United Kingdom (Note: Section 315.)

Dates
- Royal assent: 19 July 1995
- Commencement: 1 January 1996 (Note: Section 316(2).)
Other legislation
Amends	Explosives Act 1875; Explosive Substances Act 1883; Ghana Independence Act 1957; Malawi Independence Act 1964; Malta Independence Act 1964; Gambia Independence Act 1964; Barbados Independence Act 1966; Attachment of Earnings Act 1971; Industry Act 1972; Judicature (Northern Ireland) Act 1978; Customs and Excise Management Act 1979; Hydrocarbon Oil Duties Act 1979; Magistrates' Courts Act 1980; Belize Act 1981; Senior Courts Act 1981; Civil Jurisdiction and Judgments Act 1982; Public Health (Control of Disease) Act 1984; County Courts Act 1984; Australia Act 1986; Protection of Military Remains Act 1986; Debtors (Scotland) Act 1987; Pilotage Act 1987; Channel Tunnel Act 1987; Ports Act 1991; Water Resources Act 1991; Judicial Pensions and Retirement Act 1993; Value Added Tax Act 1994; See § Repealed enactments
Repeals/revokes	Mersey Channels Act 1897; Merchant Shipping Act 1897; Merchant Shipping Act 1906; British Mercantile Marine Uniform Act 1919; Merchant Shipping (Amendment) Act 1920; Merchant Shipping (Scottish Fishing Boats) Act 1920; Jamaica Independence Act 1962; Merchant Shipping (Oil Pollution) Act 1971; Prevention of Oil Pollution Act 1971; Merchant Shipping Act 1981; Prevention of Oil Pollution Act 1986; Water Industry Act 1991; Land Drainage Act 1991; Merchant Shipping (Registration, etc.) Act 1993; Merchant Shipping (Salvage and Pollution) Act 1994; See § Repealed enactments
Amended by	Education Act 1996; Petroleum Act 1998; Statute Law (Repeals) Act 1998; Postal Services Act 2000; Manufacture and Storage of Explosives Regulations 2005; Wireless Telegraphy Act 2006; Postal Services Act 2011; Marine Navigation Act 2013; Criminal Justice and Courts Act 2015; Riot Compensation Act 2016; Scotland Act 2016; Inquiries into Fatal Accidents and Sudden Deaths etc. (Scotland) Act 2016; Wales Act 2017; Employment Rights Act 2025; Tobacco and Vapes Act 2026
Relates to	Merchant Shipping (Registration, etc.) Act 1993; Shipping and Trading Interests (Protection) Act 1995

Status: Amended

Text of statute as originally enacted

Revised text of statute as amended

Text of the Merchant Shipping Act 1995 as in force today (including any amendments) within the United Kingdom, from legislation.gov.uk.

The Merchant Shipping Act 1995 (c. 21) is an act of the Parliament of the United Kingdom passed in 1995. It consolidated much of the UK's maritime legislation, repealing several acts in their entirety and provisions in many more, some dating back to the mid-nineteenth century. It appoints several officers of Admiralty Jurisdiction such as the Receiver of Wreck. The act of 1995 updates the prior Merchant Shipping Act 1894 (57 & 58 Vict. c. 60). The lead part on British ships was impacted by the outcome of the Factortame case, as the Merchant Shipping Act 1988 was impugned by the Common Fisheries Policy.

== Content of act ==
The act comprises 316 sections divided into 13 Parts:

- Part I: British ships
- Part II: Registration
- Part III: Masters and Seamen
- Part IV: Safety
- Part V: Fishing Vessels
- Part VI: Prevention of Pollution
- Part VII: Liability of Shipowners and Others
- Part VIII: Lighthouses
- Part IX: Salvage and Wreck
- Part X: Enforcement Officers and Powers
- Part XI: Accident Investigations and Inquiries
- Part XII: Legal Proceeding
- Part XIII: Supplemental

=== Part II: Registration ===
The act details British law on entitlement for Ship registration, including qualifications, pre-conditions and the machinery for registration.

=== Part VIII: Lighthouses ===
Part VIII of the act provides the powers and duties of the general lighthouse authorities and local lighthouse authorities.

=== Part IX: Salvage and Wreck ===
Receiver of Wreck is a post defined in Part IX of the act. It is an official of the British government whose main task is to process incoming reports of shipwrecks in order to give legitimate owners the opportunity to retrieve their property and ensure that law-abiding finders of wreck receive an appropriate reward. According to the act, a wreck includes jetsam, flotsam, lagan and derelict found on the seashore or in tidal waters.

=== Part XI: Accident Investigations and Inquiries ===
Part XI of the act provides the powers and duties of the Marine Accident Investigation Branch.

=== Repealed enactments ===
Section 314(1) of the act repealed 97 enactments, listed in schedule 12 to the act. (Note: Note to schedule 12: The repeals of sections 5 to 7, 29(2) and 30(1) of the Prevention of Oil Pollution Act 1971 do not apply so far as those provisions relate to sections 2(1) and (3) of that Act.) (Note: Note to schedule 12: The repeals in the Crown Proceedings Act 1947 apply in relation to Her Majesty's Government in Northern Ireland as they apply in relation to Her Majesty's Government in the United Kingdom.)

Citation	Short title	Extent of repeal
17 & 18 Vict.. c. 120	Merchant Shipping Repeal Act 1854	Section 7.
34 & 35 Vict.. c. xxi	Lloyd's Act 1871	Section 33.
57 & 58 Vict.. c. 60	Merchant Shipping Act 1894	Section 66.
57 & 58 Vict.. c. 60	Merchant Shipping Act 1894	Section 76.
57 & 58 Vict.. c. 60	Merchant Shipping Act 1894	Section 82.
57 & 58 Vict.. c. 60	Merchant Shipping Act 1894	Section 84.
57 & 58 Vict.. c. 60	Merchant Shipping Act 1894	Sections 287 and 288.
57 & 58 Vict.. c. 60	Merchant Shipping Act 1894	Section 422.
57 & 58 Vict.. c. 60	Merchant Shipping Act 1894	Section 449.
57 & 58 Vict.. c. 60	Merchant Shipping Act 1894	Section 458.
57 & 58 Vict.. c. 60	Merchant Shipping Act 1894	Sections 510 to 513.
57 & 58 Vict.. c. 60	Merchant Shipping Act 1894	Sections 515 and 516.
57 & 58 Vict.. c. 60	Merchant Shipping Act 1894	Sections 518 to 525.
57 & 58 Vict.. c. 60	Merchant Shipping Act 1894	Section 527.
57 & 58 Vict.. c. 60	Merchant Shipping Act 1894	Sections 530 to 537.
57 & 58 Vict.. c. 60	Merchant Shipping Act 1894	Sections 551 to 553.
57 & 58 Vict.. c. 60	Merchant Shipping Act 1894	Sections 555 to 557.
57 & 58 Vict.. c. 60	Merchant Shipping Act 1894	Sections 566 to 568.
57 & 58 Vict.. c. 60	Merchant Shipping Act 1894	Section 569(2).
57 & 58 Vict.. c. 60	Merchant Shipping Act 1894	Section 570.
57 & 58 Vict.. c. 60	Merchant Shipping Act 1894	Section 571.
57 & 58 Vict.. c. 60	Merchant Shipping Act 1894	Sections 634 to 636.
57 & 58 Vict.. c. 60	Merchant Shipping Act 1894	Sections 638 and 639.
57 & 58 Vict.. c. 60	Merchant Shipping Act 1894	Sections 642 to 643A.
57 & 58 Vict.. c. 60	Merchant Shipping Act 1894	Sections 647 to 656.
57 & 58 Vict.. c. 60	Merchant Shipping Act 1894	Section 657 so far as relating to Northern Ireland.
57 & 58 Vict.. c. 60	Merchant Shipping Act 1894	Sections 658 to 660.
57 & 58 Vict.. c. 60	Merchant Shipping Act 1894	Sections 662 to 662B.
57 & 58 Vict.. c. 60	Merchant Shipping Act 1894	Section 664.
57 & 58 Vict.. c. 60	Merchant Shipping Act 1894	Sections 666 to 669.
57 & 58 Vict.. c. 60	Merchant Shipping Act 1894	Sections 676 and 677.
57 & 58 Vict.. c. 60	Merchant Shipping Act 1894	Sections 679 to 681.
57 & 58 Vict.. c. 60	Merchant Shipping Act 1894	Sections 683 to 687B.
57 & 58 Vict.. c. 60	Merchant Shipping Act 1894	Section 688 so far as relating to Scotland.
57 & 58 Vict.. c. 60	Merchant Shipping Act 1894	Section 689.
57 & 58 Vict.. c. 60	Merchant Shipping Act 1894	Sections 691 to 693.
57 & 58 Vict.. c. 60	Merchant Shipping Act 1894	Sections 695 to 697.
57 & 58 Vict.. c. 60	Merchant Shipping Act 1894	Sections 702 and 703.
57 & 58 Vict.. c. 60	Merchant Shipping Act 1894	Sections 710 to 715.
57 & 58 Vict.. c. 60	Merchant Shipping Act 1894	Sections 717 and 718.
57 & 58 Vict.. c. 60	Merchant Shipping Act 1894	Sections 720 to 724.
57 & 58 Vict.. c. 60	Merchant Shipping Act 1894	Sections 726 to 728.
57 & 58 Vict.. c. 60	Merchant Shipping Act 1894	Sections 731 and 732.
57 & 58 Vict.. c. 60	Merchant Shipping Act 1894	Sections 735 and 736.
57 & 58 Vict.. c. 60	Merchant Shipping Act 1894	Section 738(1) and (2).
57 & 58 Vict.. c. 60	Merchant Shipping Act 1894	Section 739.
57 & 58 Vict.. c. 60	Merchant Shipping Act 1894	Sections 741 to 743.
57 & 58 Vict.. c. 60	Merchant Shipping Act 1894	Sections 745 to 747.
57 & 58 Vict.. c. 60	Merchant Shipping Act 1894	Schedule 17.
57 & 58 Vict.. c. 60	Merchant Shipping Act 1894	Schedule 19.
60 & 61 Vict.. c. 21	Mersey Channels Act 1897	The whole act.
60 & 61 Vict.. c. 59	Merchant Shipping Act 1897	The whole act.
61 & 62 Vict.. c. 44	Merchant Shipping (Mercantile Marine Fund) Act 1898	Sections 1 and 1A.
61 & 62 Vict.. c. 44	Merchant Shipping (Mercantile Marine Fund) Act 1898	Section 2(3) so far as relating to the Sombrero lighthouse in the Leeward Islands.
61 & 62 Vict.. c. 44	Merchant Shipping (Mercantile Marine Fund) Act 1898	Sections 2A and 2B.
61 & 62 Vict.. c. 44	Merchant Shipping (Mercantile Marine Fund) Act 1898	Section 5(1)(2).
61 & 62 Vict.. c. 44	Merchant Shipping (Mercantile Marine Fund) Act 1898	Section 9.
61 & 62 Vict.. c. 44	Merchant Shipping (Mercantile Marine Fund) Act 1898	In Schedule 3, the entry for the Sombrero lighthouse in the Leeward Islands.
63 & 64 Vict.. c. 32	Merchant Shipping (Liability of Shipowners and Others) Act 1900	Sections 2 to 5.
6 Edw. 7. c. 48	Merchant Shipping Act 1906	Section 72.
6 Edw. 7. c. 48	Merchant Shipping Act 1906	Sections 75 and 76.
6 Edw. 7. c. 48	Merchant Shipping Act 1906	Sections 78 to 80.
6 Edw. 7. c. 48	Merchant Shipping Act 1906	Sections 84 and 86.
1 & 2 Geo. 5. c. 57	Maritime Conventions Act 1911	Sections 1 to 3 and 4(2).
1 & 2 Geo. 5. c. 57	Maritime Conventions Act 1911	Sections 5 to 10.
9 & 10 Geo. 5. c. 62	British Mercantile Marine Uniform Act 1919	The whole act.
9 & 10 Geo. 5. c. 92	Aliens Restriction (Amendment) Act 1919	Section 5.
10 & 11 Geo. 5. c. 2	Merchant Shipping (Amendment) Act 1920	The whole act.
10 & 11 Geo. 5. c. 39	Merchant Shipping (Scottish Fishing Boats) Act 1920	The whole act.
11 & 12 Geo. 5. c. 28	Merchant Shipping Act 1921	Sections 2 to 4.
22 & 23 Geo. 5. c. 4	Statute of Westminster 1931	Section 5.
22 & 23 Geo. 5. c. 9	Merchant Shipping (Safety and Load Line Conventions) Act 1932	Section 5(2) and (3).
22 & 23 Geo. 5. c. 9	Merchant Shipping (Safety and Load Line Conventions) Act 1932	Section 8.
22 & 23 Geo. 5. c. 9	Merchant Shipping (Safety and Load Line Conventions) Act 1932	Section 24.
22 & 23 Geo. 5. c. 9	Merchant Shipping (Safety and Load Line Conventions) Act 1932	Section 62(1) and (3).
22 & 23 Geo. 5. c. 9	Merchant Shipping (Safety and Load Line Conventions) Act 1932	Section 69.
22 & 23 Geo. 5. c. 9	Merchant Shipping (Safety and Load Line Conventions) Act 1932	Sections 73 and 74.
22 & 23 Geo. 5. c. 9	Merchant Shipping (Safety and Load Line Conventions) Act 1932	Schedule 1.
2 & 3 Geo. 6. c. 83	Pensions (Navy, Army, Air Force and Mercantile Marine) Act 1939	Section 6(3).
11 & 12 Geo. 6. c. 7	Ceylon Independence Act 1947	In Schedule 1, paragraph 3.
10 & 11 Geo. 6. c. 44	Crown Proceedings Act 1947	Sections 5 to 8. Section 30.
11 & 12 Geo. 6. c. 44	Merchant Shipping Act 1948	Section 5.
12, 13 & 14 Geo. 6. c. 29	Consular Conventions Act 1949	Section 5(2).
12, 13 & 14 Geo. 6. c. 43	Merchant Shipping (Safety Conventions) Act 1949	Section 22.
12, 13 & 14 Geo. 6. c. 43	Merchant Shipping (Safety Conventions) Act 1949	Section 25.
12, 13 & 14 Geo. 6. c. 43	Merchant Shipping (Safety Conventions) Act 1949	Section 32.
12, 13 & 14 Geo. 6. c. 43	Merchant Shipping (Safety Conventions) Act 1949	Section 34.
12, 13 & 14 Geo. 6. c. 43	Merchant Shipping (Safety Conventions) Act 1949	Section 35(1).
12, 13 & 14 Geo. 6. c. 43	Merchant Shipping (Safety Conventions) Act 1949	Sections 36 (so far as unrepealed) and 37.
12, 13 & 14 Geo. 6. c. 43	Merchant Shipping (Safety Conventions) Act 1949	In Schedule 1, paragraph 1.
14 Geo. 6. c. 9	Merchant Shipping Act 1950	Sections 7 and 8.
14 Geo. 6. c. 27	Arbitration Act 1950	In section 29, subsection (1) and in subsection (2) the words preceding "an arbitration".
4 & 5 Eliz. 2. c. 46	Administration of Justice Act 1956	In section 47(2)(n) the words from "(including" to "way of wages)".
4 & 5 Eliz. 2. c. 46	Administration of Justice Act 1956	Section 49(1).
4 & 5 Eliz. 2. c. 46	Administration of Justice Act 1956	In Part I of Schedule 1, in paragraph 1(1)(j), from the beginning to "cases" and, in paragraph 1(3), the words "sections five hundred and forty-four to five hundred and forty-six of the Merchant Shipping Act, 1894, or".
5 & 6 Eliz. 2. c. 6	Ghana Independence Act 1957	In Schedule 1, paragraph 4.
5 & 6 Eliz. 2. c. 6	Ghana Independence Act 1957	In Schedule 2, paragraphs 7 and 8.
5 & 6 Eliz. 2. c. 60	Federation of Malaya Independence Act 1957	In Schedule 1, paragraphs 9 and 10.
8 & 9 Eliz. 2. c. 52	Cyprus Act 1960	In the Schedule, paragraph 10.
8 & 9 Eliz. 2. c. 55	Nigeria Independence Act 1960	In Schedule 1, paragraph 4.
8 & 9 Eliz. 2. c. 55	Nigeria Independence Act 1960	In Schedule 2, paragraphs 7 and 8.
9 & 10 Eliz. 2. c. 1	Tanganyika Independence Act 1961	In Schedule 1, paragraph 4.
9 & 10 Eliz. 2. c. 1	Tanganyika Independence Act 1961	In Schedule 2, paragraphs 7 and 8.
9 & 10 Eliz. 2. c. 16	Sierra Leone Independence Act 1961	In Schedule 2, paragraph 4.
9 & 10 Eliz. 2. c. 16	Sierra Leone Independence Act 1961	In Schedule 3, paragraphs 8 and 9.
10 & 11 Eliz. 2. c. 23	South Africa Act 1962	In Schedule 3, paragraph 6.
10 & 11 Eliz. 2. c. 30	Northern Ireland Act 1962	Section 25(1)(a).
10 & 11 Eliz. 2. c. 40	Jamaica Independence Act 1962	In Schedule 1, paragraph 4.
10 & 11 Eliz. 2. c. 40	Jamaica Independence Act 1962	In Schedule 2, paragraphs 7 and 8.
10 & 11 Eliz. 2. c. 54	Trinidad and Tobago Independence Act 1962	In Schedule 1, paragraph 4.
10 & 11 Eliz. 2. c. 54	Trinidad and Tobago Independence Act 1962	In Schedule 3, paragraphs 7 and 8.
10 & 11 Eliz. 2. c. 57	Uganda Independence Act 1962	In Schedule 1, paragraph 4.
10 & 11 Eliz. 2. c. 57	Uganda Independence Act 1962	In Schedule 2, paragraphs 7 and 8.
1963 c. 54	Kenya Independence Act 1963	In Schedule 1, paragraph 4.
1963 c. 54	Kenya Independence Act 1963	In Schedule 2, paragraphs 7 and 8.
1963 c. 55	Zanzibar Act 1963	In Schedule 1, paragraph 8.
1964 c. 26	Licensing Act 1964	Section 158.
1964 c. 40	Harbours Act 1964	Section 29(2) and (3).
1964 c. 40	Harbours Act 1964	Section 30(2).
1964 c. 40	Harbours Act 1964	In section 30(3) the words from "and no charge" to the end.
1964 c. 40	Harbours Act 1964	Section 35.
1964 c. 46	Malawi Independence Act 1964	In Schedule 1, paragraph 4(a).
1964 c. 46	Malawi Independence Act 1964	In Schedule 2, paragraphs 7 and 8.
1964 c. 47	Merchant Shipping Act 1964	Section 9 so far as unrepealed.
1964 c. 47	Merchant Shipping Act 1964	Section 11.
1964 c. 47	Merchant Shipping Act 1964	Section 16.
1964 c. 47	Merchant Shipping Act 1964	Sections 19 and 20.
1964 c. 86	Malta Independence Act 1964	In Schedule 1, paragraph 4(a).
1964 c. 86	Malta Independence Act 1964	In Schedule 2, paragraphs 7 and 8.
1964 c. 93	Gambia Independence Act 1964	In Schedule 1, paragraph 4(a).
1964 c. 93	Gambia Independence Act 1964	In Schedule 2, paragraphs 7 and 8.
1965 c. 32	Administration of Estates (Small Payments) Act 1965	Section 6(1)(c).
1965 c. 47	Merchant Shipping Act 1965	The whole act so far as unrepealed.
1966 c. 14	Guyana Independence Act 1966	In Schedule 1, paragraph 4(a).
1966 c. 14	Guyana Independence Act 1966	In Schedule 2, paragraphs 7 and 8.
1966 c. 29	Singapore Act 1966	In the Schedule, paragraphs 10 and 11.
1966 c. 37	Barbados Independence Act 1966	In Schedule 1, paragraph 4(a).
1966 c. 37	Barbados Independence Act 1966	In Schedule 2, paragraphs 7 and 8.
1967 c. 27	Merchant Shipping (Load Lines) Act 1967	Sections 1 to 25.
1967 c. 27	Merchant Shipping (Load Lines) Act 1967	Section 27(1), (3) and (5).
1967 c. 27	Merchant Shipping (Load Lines) Act 1967	Sections 30 to 34.
1967 c. 27	Merchant Shipping (Load Lines) Act 1967	Schedules 1 and 2.
1968 c. 8	Mauritius Independence Act 1968	In Schedule 1, paragraph 4(a).
1968 c. 8	Mauritius Independence Act 1968	In Schedule 2, paragraphs 7 and 8.
1969 c. 48	Post Office Act 1969	In section 3, in subsection (1) the words from "and the first reference" to "to navigation)" and, in subsection (6) the words from "and section 36" to the end.
1970 c. 27	Fishing Vessels (Safety Provisions) Act 1970	Section 1.
1970 c. 27	Fishing Vessels (Safety Provisions) Act 1970	Section 2(1).
1970 c. 27	Fishing Vessels (Safety Provisions) Act 1970	Sections 3 to 5.
1970 c. 27	Fishing Vessels (Safety Provisions) Act 1970	Section 7.
1970 c. 27	Fishing Vessels (Safety Provisions) Act 1970	Sections 9 to 11.
1970 c. 36	Merchant Shipping Act 1970	Sections 1 to 5.
1970 c. 36	Merchant Shipping Act 1970	Sections 7 to 18.
1970 c. 36	Merchant Shipping Act 1970	Section 20.
1970 c. 36	Merchant Shipping Act 1970	Section 22.
1970 c. 36	Merchant Shipping Act 1970	Sections 25 to 28.
1970 c. 36	Merchant Shipping Act 1970	Section 30.
1970 c. 36	Merchant Shipping Act 1970	Sections 32 and 33.
1970 c. 36	Merchant Shipping Act 1970	Sections 39 to 41.
1970 c. 36	Merchant Shipping Act 1970	Sections 43 to 54.
1970 c. 36	Merchant Shipping Act 1970	Sections 56 to 64.
1970 c. 36	Merchant Shipping Act 1970	Sections 67 to 72.
1970 c. 36	Merchant Shipping Act 1970	Sections 74 to 83.
1970 c. 36	Merchant Shipping Act 1970	Section 85.
1970 c. 36	Merchant Shipping Act 1970	Section 86.
1970 c. 36	Merchant Shipping Act 1970	Section 88.
1970 c. 36	Merchant Shipping Act 1970	Section 91.
1970 c. 36	Merchant Shipping Act 1970	Sections 95 to 101.
1970 c. 36	Merchant Shipping Act 1970	Schedules 1 to 5.
1970 c. 50	Fiji Independence Act 1970	In Schedule 1, paragraph 4(a).
1970 c. 50	Fiji Independence Act 1970	In Schedule 2, paragraph 6.
1971 c. 59	Merchant Shipping (Oil Pollution) Act 1971	The whole act.
1971 c. 60	Prevention of Oil Pollution Act 1971	Section 2(2A) and (2B).
1971 c. 60	Prevention of Oil Pollution Act 1971	Section 5.
1971 c. 60	Prevention of Oil Pollution Act 1971	Section 6(1)(a).
1971 c. 60	Prevention of Oil Pollution Act 1971	Section 7.
1971 c. 60	Prevention of Oil Pollution Act 1971	Section 8(2).
1971 c. 60	Prevention of Oil Pollution Act 1971	Section 10.
1971 c. 60	Prevention of Oil Pollution Act 1971	In section 11, in subsection (1), paragraphs (a) and (b) and the words "the owner or master of the vessel, or" and ", as the case may be," and subsection (2).
1971 c. 60	Prevention of Oil Pollution Act 1971	Sections 12 to 17.
1971 c. 60	Prevention of Oil Pollution Act 1971	Section 18(4).
1971 c. 60	Prevention of Oil Pollution Act 1971	Section 19(2)(b) and (c).
1971 c. 60	Prevention of Oil Pollution Act 1971	Section 19A.
1971 c. 60	Prevention of Oil Pollution Act 1971	Section 20.
1971 c. 60	Prevention of Oil Pollution Act 1971	Section 21.
1971 c. 60	Prevention of Oil Pollution Act 1971	Section 23 so far as it relates to vessels.
1971 c. 60	Prevention of Oil Pollution Act 1971	Section 24.
1971 c. 60	Prevention of Oil Pollution Act 1971	Section 25(2) and (3).
1971 c. 60	Prevention of Oil Pollution Act 1971	Section 27(4).
1971 c. 60	Prevention of Oil Pollution Act 1971	In section 29(1) the definitions of— "barge"; and "outside the territorial waters of the United Kingdom"; and subsections (2), (4), (5) and (6).
1971 c. 60	Prevention of Oil Pollution Act 1971	Section 30(1) and (2).
1972 c. 5 (N.I.)	Water Act (Northern Ireland) 1972	Section 32(3).
1972 c. 11	Superannuation Act 1972	Section 17.
1973 c. 27	Bahamas Independence Act 1973	In Schedule 1, paragraph 4(a).
1973 c. 27	Bahamas Independence Act 1973	In Schedule 2, paragraph 5.
1973 c. 49	Bangladesh Act 1973	In the Schedule, paragraph 6.
1974 c. 43	Merchant Shipping Act 1974	Sections 1 to 8A.
1974 c. 43	Merchant Shipping Act 1974	Sections 16 to 18.
1974 c. 43	Merchant Shipping Act 1974	Section 19(1) and (3) to (6).
1974 c. 43	Merchant Shipping Act 1974	Section 21.
1974 c. 43	Merchant Shipping Act 1974	Sections 23 and 24.
1974 c. 43	Merchant Shipping Act 1974	Schedules 1 and 5.
1976 c. 19	Seychelles Act 1976	In the Schedule, paragraph 6.
1978 c. 15	Solomon Islands Act 1978	In the Schedule, paragraph 4.
1978 c. 20	Tuvalu Act 1978	In Schedule 1, paragraph 4(a).
1978 c. 20	Tuvalu Act 1978	In Schedule 2, paragraph 4.
1979 c. 27	Kiribati Act 1979	In the Schedule, paragraph 5.
1979 c. 39	Merchant Shipping Act 1979	Sections 14 to 39.
1979 c. 39	Merchant Shipping Act 1979	Sections 41 to 43.
1979 c. 39	Merchant Shipping Act 1979	Section 45.
1979 c. 39	Merchant Shipping Act 1979	Sections 48 to 52.
1979 c. 39	Merchant Shipping Act 1979	Schedules 3 to 7.
1980 c. 2	Papua New Guinea, Western Samoa and Nauru (Miscellaneous Provisions) Act 1980	In the Schedule, paragraphs 4 and 5.
1980 c. 16	New Hebrides Act 1980	In Schedule 1, paragraph 5.
1981 c. 10	Merchant Shipping Act 1981	The whole act.
1981 c. 52	Belize Act 1981	In Schedule 1, paragraph 4(a).
1981 c. 52	Belize Act 1981	In Schedule 2, paragraph 4.
1981 c. 54	Supreme Court Act 1981	In section 153(4)(d), the words from "section 13(1)" to "1974".
1981 c. 54	Supreme Court Act 1981	In Schedule 5, the entries relating to the Merchant Shipping (Oil Pollution) Act 1971 and the Merchant Shipping Act 1974.
SI 1981/226 (NI 6)	Judgments Enforcement (Northern Ireland) Order 1981	In Schedule 2, paragraph 17.
SI 1981/1675 (NI 26)	Magistrates' Courts (Northern Ireland) Order 1981	In Part I of Schedule 6, paragraphs 18 and 19.
1982 c. 16	Civil Aviation Act 1982	Section 97(1).
1982 c. 27	Civil Jurisdiction and Judgments Act 1982	In section 32(4)(a) the words "section 13(3) of the Merchant Shipping (Oil Pollution) Act 1971".
1982 c. 48	Criminal Justice Act 1982	Section 49.
1982 c. 48	Criminal Justice Act 1982	Section 81(13).
1982 c. 48	Criminal Justice Act 1982	In Schedule 7, paragraph 1.
1982 c. 48	Criminal Justice Act 1982	In Schedule 14, paragraph 2.
1982 c. 48	Criminal Justice Act 1982	In Schedule 15, paragraphs 3 to 5.
1984 c. 5	Merchant Shipping Act 1984	Sections 1 to 12.
1984 c. 5	Merchant Shipping Act 1984	Section 14.
1984 c. 5	Merchant Shipping Act 1984	Schedule 1.
1984 c. 5	Merchant Shipping Act 1984	Schedule 2.
1984 c. 28	County Courts Act 1984	Section 27(11).
1985 c. 3	Brunei and Maldives Act 1985	In the Schedule, paragraph 1.
1985 c. 22	Dangerous Vessels Act 1985	Section 4.
1986 c. 2	Australia Act 1986	Section 4.
1986 c. 6	Prevention of Oil Pollution Act 1986	The whole act.
1986 c. 23	Safety at Sea Act 1986	Sections 7 to 13.
1986 c. 23	Safety at Sea Act 1986	Section 15.
1986 c. 64	Public Order Act 1986	In section 10(1), the words "and in section 515 of the Merchant Shipping Act 1894".
SI 1986/1035 (NI 9)	Companies Consolidation (Consequential Provisions) (Northern Ireland) Order 1986	In Part II of Schedule 1, the entries relating to the Prevention of Oil Pollution Act 1971 and the Merchant Shipping Act 1974.
1988 c. 12	Merchant Shipping Act 1988	Section 11.
1988 c. 12	Merchant Shipping Act 1988	Sections 26 to 35.
1988 c. 12	Merchant Shipping Act 1988	Sections 41 to 49.
1988 c. 12	Merchant Shipping Act 1988	Section 52.
1988 c. 12	Merchant Shipping Act 1988	Sections 53 and 55 except for purposes of section 37.
1988 c. 12	Merchant Shipping Act 1988	Section 57(1) and (3) to (5).
1988 c. 12	Merchant Shipping Act 1988	In Schedule 1, paragraph 48.
1988 c. 12	Merchant Shipping Act 1988	Schedule 4.
1988 c. 12	Merchant Shipping Act 1988	Schedules 5 to 8.
SI 1989/1339 (NI 11)	Limitation (Northern Ireland) Order 1989	In Schedule 3, paragraph 11.
1990 c. 31	Aviation and Maritime Security Act 1990	In section 51(2), the words "section 94 of the Merchant Shipping Act 1970".
1990 c. 31	Aviation and Maritime Security Act 1990	In Schedule 3, paragraph 2.
1990 c. 41	Courts and Legal Services Act 1990	In Schedule 10, paragraph 55.
1990 c. 43	Environmental Protection Act 1990	Section 148.
1990 c. 43	Environmental Protection Act 1990	Schedule 14 except so far as the amendments relate to offences under section 2(1) of the Prevention of Oil Pollution Act 1971.
1991 c. 52	Ports Act 1991	Sections 31 to 34.
1991 c. 52	Ports Act 1991	Section 36(2)(c).
1991 c. 52	Ports Act 1991	In section 41, in subsection (1) the words "31 to" and "36(2)(c)" and subsection (2).
1991 c. 52	Ports Act 1991	Section 42(2).
SI 1991/1219 (NI 10)	Dangerous Vessels (Northern Ireland) Order 1991	Article 6.
1993 c. 8	Judicial Pensions and Retirement Act 1993	In Schedule 6, paragraph 59.
1993 c. 22	Merchant Shipping (Registration, etc.) Act 1993	The whole act.
1994 c. 28	Merchant Shipping (Salvage and Pollution) Act 1994	The whole act.
1994 c. 39	Local Government etc. (Scotland) Act 1994	In Schedule 13, paragraph 7.

== Subsequent developments ==
The Merchant Shipping (Pollution) Act 2006 amended section 178(1) of the act. It restricts claims to being enforced within three years of the damage occurring, whereas previously it had been restricted to within three years after "the claim against the Fund arose", and within six years of the damage occurring.

The Marine Navigation Act 2013 made four changes to the act:

- Section 47 was amended so that regulations relating to manning requirements on ships may refer to information contained in other documents.
- Section 193 was amended to specify the area of sea in which each Authority may operate.
- Section 197 was amended and section 197A added to enable the general lighthouse authorities to enter into a broader range of commercial agreements. The income from these agreements will supplement revenue from light dues, used to fund the work of the Authorities.
- Section 252 was amended to enable lighthouse authorities to mark wrecks by electronic methods as well as physical aids to navigation.

== See also ==
- Merchant Shipping Act
- Merchant Shipping Act 1894
- Merchant Shipping Act 1786
- R (Factortame Ltd) v Secretary of State for Transport
