= Merchant Shipping (Registration, etc.) Act 1993 =

Act of the Parliament of the United Kingdom

Merchant Shipping (Registration, etc.) Act 1993 (Note: Section 10(1).)
- Act of Parliament
- Parliament of the United Kingdom
- Long title: An Act to amend and restate the law relating to the registration of ships and related matters, to make provision in relation to ships on bareboat charter and to make amendments designed to facilitate, or otherwise desirable in connection with, the consolidation of the enactments relating to shipping and seamen.
- Citation: 1993 c. 22
- Territorial extent: United Kingdom (Note: Section 10(4).)

Dates
- Royal assent: 1 July 1993
- Commencement: 21 March 1994 (registration of ships) (Note: Section 10(2). The Merchant Shipping (Registration, etc.) Act 1993 (Commencement No. 1 and Transitional Provisions) Order 1993 (SI 1993/3137).); 1 May 1994 (rest of act) (Note: Section 10(2). The Merchant Shipping (Registration, etc.) Act 1993 (Commencement No. 1 and Transitional Provisions) Order 1993 (SI 1993/3137).)
- Repealed: 1 January 1996

Other legislation
- Amends: See § Repealed enactments
- Repeals/revokes: See § Repealed enactments
- Repealed by: Merchant Shipping Act 1995

Status: Repealed

Text of statute as originally enacted

Revised text of statute as amended

The Merchant Shipping (Registration, etc.) Act 1993 (c. 22) was an act of the Parliament of the United Kingdom that amended and restated the law relating to the registration of ships and related matters in the United Kingdom, and made pre-consolidation amendments to the enactments relating to merchant shipping and seamen.

== Provisions ==
=== Repealed enactments ===
Section 8(4) of the act repealed 32 enactments, listed in parts I and II of schedule 5 to the act.

Part I: Repeals consequential on this Act
Citation	Short title	Extent of repeal
57 & 58 Vict. c. 60	Merchant Shipping Act 1894	Section 4(1) and (3).
57 & 58 Vict. c. 60	Merchant Shipping Act 1894	Sections 5 to 18.
57 & 58 Vict. c. 60	Merchant Shipping Act 1894	Sections 20 to 38.
57 & 58 Vict. c. 60	Merchant Shipping Act 1894	Sections 47 to 53B.
57 & 58 Vict. c. 60	Merchant Shipping Act 1894	Sections 56 to 60.
57 & 58 Vict. c. 60	Merchant Shipping Act 1894	Section 61(2).
57 & 58 Vict. c. 60	Merchant Shipping Act 1894	Sections 62 to 65.
57 & 58 Vict. c. 60	Merchant Shipping Act 1894	Sections 67 to 70.
57 & 58 Vict. c. 60	Merchant Shipping Act 1894	Sections 72 to 74.
57 & 58 Vict. c. 60	Merchant Shipping Act 1894	In section 422(1)(b), the words "of the port to which she belongs, and also".
57 & 58 Vict. c. 60	Merchant Shipping Act 1894	Section 694.
57 & 58 Vict. c. 60	Merchant Shipping Act 1894	Section 698.
57 & 58 Vict. c. 60	Merchant Shipping Act 1894	Schedule 1 Part II.
61 & 62 Vict. c. 44	Merchant Shipping (Mercantile Marine Fund) Act 1898	Section 3.
6 Edw. 7. c. 48	Merchant Shipping Act 1906	Sections 50 and 53.
11 & 12 Geo. 5. c. 8	Merchant Shipping Act 1921	Section 1(1)(3).
1983 c. 13	Merchant Shipping Act 1983	Section 5.
1983 c. 13	Merchant Shipping Act 1983	Sections 7 and 8.
1983 c. 13	Merchant Shipping Act 1983	Section 9(1).
1983 c. 13	Merchant Shipping Act 1983	Sections 10 and 11.
1983 c. 13	Merchant Shipping Act 1983	The Schedule.
1988 c. 12	Merchant Shipping Act 1988	Sections 1 to 10.
1988 c. 12	Merchant Shipping Act 1988	In section 11(3), the words "under Part I of the 1894 Act".
1988 c. 12	Merchant Shipping Act 1988	Sections 12 to 25.
1988 c. 12	Merchant Shipping Act 1988	In section 47(7), the definition of "the registration enactments".
1988 c. 12	Merchant Shipping Act 1988	Schedule 1 except paragraph 48.
1988 c. 12	Merchant Shipping Act 1988	Schedules 2 and 3.
1988 c. 12	Merchant Shipping Act 1988	In Schedule 6, the entries relating to the Contracts of Employment and Redundancy Payments Act (Northern Ireland) 1965; Sea Fish (Conservation) Act 1967; Sea Fisheries Act 1968; Fishing Vessels (Safety Provisions) Act 1970; Fishery Limits Act 1976; Employment Protection (Consolidation) Act 1978; Customs and Excise Management Act 1979; British Fishing Boats Act 1983; Merchant Shipping Act 1983; Inshore Fishing (Scotland) Act 1984; and Safety at Sea Act 1986.

Part II: Pre-consolidation Repeals
Citation	Short title	Extent of repeal
17 & 18 Vict. c. 120	Merchant Shipping Repeal Act 1854	Section 7.
24 & 25 Vict. c. 97	Malicious Damage Act 1861	Sections 47 and 48.
57 & 58 Vict. c. 60	Merchant Shipping Act 1894	Section 75.
57 & 58 Vict. c. 60	Merchant Shipping Act 1894	In section 76, in subsection (1), the words from "and may award" to the end and, in subsection (2), the words "either" and "or criminally".
57 & 58 Vict. c. 60	Merchant Shipping Act 1894	Sections 83, 86 and 87.
57 & 58 Vict. c. 60	Merchant Shipping Act 1894	Section 126.
57 & 58 Vict. c. 60	Merchant Shipping Act 1894	In section 282(a) the words "knowingly and".
57 & 58 Vict. c. 60	Merchant Shipping Act 1894	Sections 284 to 286.
57 & 58 Vict. c. 60	Merchant Shipping Act 1894	In section 287(1), paragraphs (f) and (g).
57 & 58 Vict. c. 60	Merchant Shipping Act 1894	Section 356.
57 & 58 Vict. c. 60	Merchant Shipping Act 1894	Section 359.
57 & 58 Vict. c. 60	Merchant Shipping Act 1894	Sections 366 and 367.
57 & 58 Vict. c. 60	Merchant Shipping Act 1894	Sections 418 and 419.
57 & 58 Vict. c. 60	Merchant Shipping Act 1894	Section 421.
57 & 58 Vict. c. 60	Merchant Shipping Act 1894	Sections 427 to 433.
57 & 58 Vict. c. 60	Merchant Shipping Act 1894	Section 436.
57 & 58 Vict. c. 60	Merchant Shipping Act 1894	Sections 446 to 448 and 450.
57 & 58 Vict. c. 60	Merchant Shipping Act 1894	Section 458(2)(b).
57 & 58 Vict. c. 60	Merchant Shipping Act 1894	Sections 459 to 462.
57 & 58 Vict. c. 60	Merchant Shipping Act 1894	Section 478.
57 & 58 Vict. c. 60	Merchant Shipping Act 1894	Sections 480 to 490.
57 & 58 Vict. c. 60	Merchant Shipping Act 1894	Section 514.
57 & 58 Vict. c. 60	Merchant Shipping Act 1894	In section 515, the words "and tumultuously".
57 & 58 Vict. c. 60	Merchant Shipping Act 1894	In section 516(2), the words "and shall place the same in the custody of the receiver".
57 & 58 Vict. c. 60	Merchant Shipping Act 1894	Section 517.
57 & 58 Vict. c. 60	Merchant Shipping Act 1894	In section 518(a), the words "of the district".
57 & 58 Vict. c. 60	Merchant Shipping Act 1894	Section 526.
57 & 58 Vict. c. 60	Merchant Shipping Act 1894	Sections 528 and 529.
57 & 58 Vict. c. 60	Merchant Shipping Act 1894	Section 543.
57 & 58 Vict. c. 60	Merchant Shipping Act 1894	Sections 547 to 549.
57 & 58 Vict. c. 60	Merchant Shipping Act 1894	Section 550.
57 & 58 Vict. c. 60	Merchant Shipping Act 1894	In section 551(1), the words from "of the district" to "made".
57 & 58 Vict. c. 60	Merchant Shipping Act 1894	Section 554.
57 & 58 Vict. c. 60	Merchant Shipping Act 1894	Sections 558 to 565.
57 & 58 Vict. c. 60	Merchant Shipping Act 1894	In section 634(1), the words "and the Channel Islands", "and at Gibraltar" and "and the Isle of Man".
57 & 58 Vict. c. 60	Merchant Shipping Act 1894	In section 650(1), the word "guns".
57 & 58 Vict. c. 60	Merchant Shipping Act 1894	Section 655 (so far as in force in Northern Ireland).
57 & 58 Vict. c. 60	Merchant Shipping Act 1894	In section 656(2), the words from "and shall" (where first occurring) to the end.
57 & 58 Vict. c. 60	Merchant Shipping Act 1894	In section 667, the words "fire" and "burnt" wherever occurring together with the word "or" in conjunction with either of those words.
57 & 58 Vict. c. 60	Merchant Shipping Act 1894	Section 669.
57 & 58 Vict. c. 60	Merchant Shipping Act 1894	Section 676(1)(c).
57 & 58 Vict. c. 60	Merchant Shipping Act 1894	In section 677(1)(f), the words "on account of the property of deceased seamen or".
57 & 58 Vict. c. 60	Merchant Shipping Act 1894	Section 686(2).
57 & 58 Vict. c. 60	Merchant Shipping Act 1894	In section 689(3), the words from "and that officer" to the end.
57 & 58 Vict. c. 60	Merchant Shipping Act 1894	Section 694.
57 & 58 Vict. c. 60	Merchant Shipping Act 1894	Sections 698 to 700.
57 & 58 Vict. c. 60	Merchant Shipping Act 1894	In section 702, the words "Subject to section 703 of this Act", the words from "or criminal" to "sheriff court", and "and with imprisonment in default of payment" and the words from "or in the case" to the end.
57 & 58 Vict. c. 60	Merchant Shipping Act 1894	Sections 704 to 709.
57 & 58 Vict. c. 60	Merchant Shipping Act 1894	Section 716.
57 & 58 Vict. c. 60	Merchant Shipping Act 1894	Section 719.
57 & 58 Vict. c. 60	Merchant Shipping Act 1894	Section 724(3) and (5) except, in subsection (3), the words "may remove any surveyors of ships".
57 & 58 Vict. c. 60	Merchant Shipping Act 1894	Sections 733 and 734.
57 & 58 Vict. c. 60	Merchant Shipping Act 1894	Section 737.
57 & 58 Vict. c. 60	Merchant Shipping Act 1894	Schedule 20 so far as unrepealed.
61 & 62 Vict. c. 44	Merchant Shipping (Mercantile Marine Fund) Act 1898	Section 2(3), (4) and (5).
61 & 62 Vict. c. 44	Merchant Shipping (Mercantile Marine Fund) Act 1898	Section 7.
61 & 62 Vict. c. 44	Merchant Shipping (Mercantile Marine Fund) Act 1898	In Schedule 3, the entry for the lighthouse on Cape Pembroke, Falkland Islands.
6 Edw. 7. c. 48	Merchant Shipping Act 1906	Sections 2 and 6.
6 Edw. 7. c. 48	Merchant Shipping Act 1906	Sections 15 and 16.
6 Edw. 7. c. 48	Merchant Shipping Act 1906	Section 27.
6 Edw. 7. c. 48	Merchant Shipping Act 1906	Section 44.
6 Edw. 7. c. 48	Merchant Shipping Act 1906	Section 49.
6 Edw. 7. c. 48	Merchant Shipping Act 1906	Section 58.
6 Edw. 7. c. 48	Merchant Shipping Act 1906	Section 77.
13 & 14 Geo. 5. c. 4	Fees (Increase) Act 1923	The whole act.
15 & 16 Geo. 5. c. 37	Merchant Shipping (Equivalent Provisions) Act 1925	The whole act.
22 & 23 Geo. 5. c. 9	Merchant Shipping (Safety and Load Line Conventions) Act 1932	Section 12.
22 & 23 Geo. 5. c. 9	Merchant Shipping (Safety and Load Line Conventions) Act 1932	Section 27.
22 & 23 Geo. 5. c. 9	Merchant Shipping (Safety and Load Line Conventions) Act 1932	Sections 29 to 31.
22 & 23 Geo. 5. c. 9	Merchant Shipping (Safety and Load Line Conventions) Act 1932	Section 36.
24 & 25 Geo. 5. c. 18	Illegal Trawling (Scotland) Act 1934	Section 2.
24 & 25 Geo. 5. c. 18	Illegal Trawling (Scotland) Act 1934	In section 6, the definitions of "fishing boat" and "voyage".
12, 13 & 14 Geo. 6. c. 43	Merchant Shipping (Safety Convention) Act 1949	Sections 1 to 6.
12, 13 & 14 Geo. 6. c. 43	Merchant Shipping (Safety Convention) Act 1949	Section 19.
12, 13 & 14 Geo. 6. c. 43	Merchant Shipping (Safety Convention) Act 1949	Section 21.
12, 13 & 14 Geo. 6. c. 43	Merchant Shipping (Safety Convention) Act 1949	Section 23.
12, 13 & 14 Geo. 6. c. 43	Merchant Shipping (Safety Convention) Act 1949	Sections 27 to 30.
12, 13 & 14 Geo. 6. c. 43	Merchant Shipping (Safety Convention) Act 1949	Section 33.
12, 13 & 14 Geo. 6. c. 43	Merchant Shipping (Safety Convention) Act 1949	Section 35(4) and (6).
12, 13 & 14 Geo. 6. c. 43	Merchant Shipping (Safety Convention) Act 1949	In section 36(1), the definitions of "collision regulations", "construction rules", "principal Act", "radio navigational aid", "radio rules", "rules for direction finders", "rules for life-saving equipment", and "United Kingdom ship".
12, 13 & 14 Geo. 6. c. 43	Merchant Shipping (Safety Convention) Act 1949	Schedule 2.
6 & 7 Eliz. 2. c. 62	Merchant Shipping (Liability of Shipowners and Others) Act 1958	Section 11 so far as applying to the Merchant Shipping (Liability of Shipowners and Others) Act 1900.
1964 c. 47	Merchant Shipping Act 1964	Section 2.
1964 c. 47	Merchant Shipping Act 1964	Section 8.
1964 c. 47	Merchant Shipping Act 1964	Section 10.
1964 c. 47	Merchant Shipping Act 1964	Section 15.
1965 c. 47	Merchant Shipping Act 1965	Section 6.
1967 c. 27	Merchant Shipping (Load Lines) Act 1967	Sections 26, 27(2), 28 and 29.
1967 c. 64	Anchors and Chain Cables Act 1967	The whole act.
1970 c. 27	Fishing Vessels (Safety Provisions) Act 1970	Section 4(4).
1970 c. 27	Fishing Vessels (Safety Provisions) Act 1970	Section 6.
1970 c. 27	Fishing Vessels (Safety Provisions) Act 1970	Section 8.
1970 c. 27	Fishing Vessels (Safety Provisions) Act 1970	In section 9(1), the definitions of "collision regulations", "fishing vessel", "radio rules", "rules for direction finders", "rules for life-saving appliances" and "rules for radio navigational aids".
1970 c. 36	Merchant Shipping Act 1970	Section 6.
1970 c. 36	Merchant Shipping Act 1970	In section 17, in subsection (10), the words "Ministry of Home Affairs for Northern Ireland" and, in subsection (11), the words "the Ministry of Home Affairs for Northern Ireland or".
1970 c. 36	Merchant Shipping Act 1970	Section 19.
1970 c. 36	Merchant Shipping Act 1970	Section 84.
1970 c. 36	Merchant Shipping Act 1970	Section 87.
1970 c. 36	Merchant Shipping Act 1970	Section 90.
1970 c. 36	Merchant Shipping Act 1970	Sections 92 to 94.
1970 c. 36	Merchant Shipping Act 1970	Section 95(6).
1971 c. 59	Merchant Shipping (Oil Pollution) Act 1971	Section 11(3)(a).
1971 c. 59	Merchant Shipping (Oil Pollution) Act 1971	Section 18.
1971 c. 60	Prevention of Oil Pollution Act 1971	Section 18 except in its application to sections 2(1) and 3.
1971 c. 60	Prevention of Oil Pollution Act 1971	Section 22.
1971 c. 60	Prevention of Oil Pollution Act 1971	Section 25(1).
1974 c. 43	Merchant Shipping Act 1974	Section 20.
1974 c. 43	Merchant Shipping Act 1974	Section 22.
1974 c. 43	Merchant Shipping Act 1974	In Schedule 5, in paragraph 5(g), the words from "including" to the end.
1977 c. 24	Merchant Shipping (Safety Convention) Act 1977	The whole act.
1979 c. 39	Merchant Shipping Act 1979	Section 19(2) and (3).
1979 c. 39	Merchant Shipping Act 1979	In section 20(3)(b), the words from "and the payment" to the end.
1979 c. 39	Merchant Shipping Act 1979	Section 21(3)(r).
1979 c. 39	Merchant Shipping Act 1979	Sections 46 and 47.
1981 c. 10	Merchant Shipping Act 1981	In section 4(2) the words from the beginning to "that section; and".
1984 c. 5	Merchant Shipping Act 1984	Section 13.
1986 c. 23	Safety at Sea Act 1986	Sections 1 to 6.
1986 c. 23	Safety at Sea Act 1986	Section 9(4).
1986 c. 23	Safety at Sea Act 1986	In section 13(1), the definition of "fishing vessel".
1986 c. 23	Safety at Sea Act 1986	Section 14.
1988 c. 12	Merchant Shipping Act 1988	Section 34.
1988 c. 12	Merchant Shipping Act 1988	Sections 50 and 51.
1988 c. 12	Merchant Shipping Act 1988	Section 54.
1988 c. 12	Merchant Shipping Act 1988	Section 56.
1988 c. 12	Merchant Shipping Act 1988	Schedule 4.
1988 c. 12	Merchant Shipping Act 1988	In Schedule 5, paragraph 4 of the amendments of the 1894 Act.

== Subsequent developments ==
The whole act was repealed by section 314(1) of, and schedule 12 to, the Merchant Shipping Act 1995, which came into force on 1 January 1996.
