= Admiralty Court Act 1861 =

Act of the Parliament of the United Kingdom

Admiralty Court Act 1861 (Note: Section 1.)
- Act of Parliament
- Parliament of the United Kingdom
- Long title: An Act to extend the Jurisdiction and improve the Practice of the High Court of Admiralty.
- Citation: 24 & 25 Vict. c. 10
- Territorial extent: United Kingdom

Dates
- Royal assent: 17 May 1861
- Commencement: 1 June 1861 (Note: Section 3.)
- Repealed: Northern Ireland: 18 December 1953; England and Wales and Scotland: 1 January 1982
Other legislation
Amends	Merchant Shipping Act 1854
Repeals/revokes	2 Hen. 4. c. 11
Amended by	Statute Law Revision Act 1875; Statute Law Revision and Civil Procedure Act 1881; Merchant Shipping Act 1894; Supreme Court of Judicature (Consolidation) Act 1925; Administration of Justice Act 1965
Repealed by	Northern Ireland: Statute Law Revision Act 1953; England and Wales and Scotland: Senior Courts Act 1981

Status: Repealed

Text of statute as originally enacted

The Admiralty Court Act 1861 (24 & 25 Vict. c. 10) was an act of the Parliament of the United Kingdom. The act addresses the jurisdiction and practices of the High Court of Admiralty. The act received royal assent on 17 May 1861 and came into force on 1 June 1861.

== Provisions ==
The provisions of the act include:

- Allowed for claims for damage, cargo loss and rebuilding or repairing any ship to be taken to the Court.
- Extending the provision of the Merchant Shipping Act 1854 (17 & 18 Vict. c. 104) in regards to salvage.
- Extending the jurisdiction of the Court over ships in English or Welsh ports, British ships and ships in British waters.

== Subsequent developments ==
Section 16 of the act was repealed by section 34(1) of, and schedule 2 to, the Administration of Justice Act 1965 by an amendment introduced in the House of Lords. The Lord Chancellor at the time, Baron Gardiner, said that "the section had not been invoked for a very long time" and that both the president of the Probate Division and the Admiralty Registrar had "been consulted and agree that Section 16 is now obsolete". . The Administration of Justice Act 1965 (Commencement No. 1) Order 1965 (SI 1965/706) provided that this repeal would take effect on 27 April 1965.

The whole act was repealed for Northern Ireland by section 1 of, and the first schedule to, the Statute Law Revision Act 1953 (2 & 3 Eliz. 2. c. 5), which came into force on 18 December 1953.

The whole act was repealed for England and Wales and Scotland by section 152(4) of, and schedule 7 to, the Senior Courts Act 1981, which came into force on 1 January 1982.

== See also ==
- Criminal Justice Act 1988
