= Merchant Shipping Act 1906 =

Act of the Parliament of the United Kingdom

Merchant Shipping Act 1906 (Note: Section 86(1).)
- Act of Parliament
- Parliament of the United Kingdom
- Long title: An Act to amend the Merchant Shipping Acts 1894 to 1900.
- Citation: 6 Edw. 7. c. 48
- Introduced by: David Lloyd George, President of the Board of Trade
- Territorial extent: United Kingdom

Dates
- Royal assent: 21 December 1906
- Commencement: 1 June 1907 (Note: Section 86(2).)
Other legislation
| Amends | Merchant Shipping Act 1894; Merchant Shipping (Liability of Shipowners) Act 1898; Merchant Shipping (Mercantile Marine Fund) Act 1898 |
| Amended by | Pilotage Act 1913; Statute Law Revision Act 1927; Merchant Shipping (Safety And Load Line Conventions) Act 1932; Merchant Shipping (Safety Convention) Act 1949; Merchant Shipping (Liability of Shipowners and Others) Act 1958; Merchant Shipping Act 1965; Local Government Act 1966; Local Government (Scotland) Act 1966; Merchant Shipping Act 1970; Merchant Shipping (Distress Signals and Prevention of Collisions) Regulations 1983; Merchant Shipping Act 1988; Merchant Shipping (Registration, etc.) Act 1993; Merchant Shipping Act 1995; Merchant Shipping (Survey and Certification) Regulations 1995 |

Status: Partially repealed

Text of statute as originally enacted

Revised text of statute as amended

Text of the Merchant Shipping Act 1906 as in force today (including any amendments) within the United Kingdom, from legislation.gov.uk.

The Merchant Shipping Act 1906 (6 Edw. 7. c. 48) is an act of the Parliament of the United Kingdom, introduced by David Lloyd George, then President of the Board of Trade. It established regulations covering the standards of food and accommodation on British registered ships.

It was part of a number of acts introduced by David Lloyd George, and later Winston Churchill, as President of the Board of Trade, to improve conditions for workers.

== See also ==
- Merchant Shipping Act
