= Sea Fisheries Regulation Act 1966 =

Act of the Parliament of the United Kingdom

Sea Fisheries Regulation Act 1966 (Note: Section 22(1).)
- Act of Parliament
- Parliament of the United Kingdom
- Long title: An Act to consolidate (with corrections and improvements made under the Consolidation of Enactments (Procedure) Act 1949) the Sea Fisheries Regulation Acts 1888 to 1930 and certain other enactments relating to the sea fisheries of England and Wales.
- Citation: 1966 c. 38
- Territorial extent: England and Wales (Note: Section 22(2).)

Dates
- Royal assent: 17 November 1966
- Commencement: 17 December 1966 (Note: Section 22(1).)
- Repealed: 1 April 2011
Other legislation
Amends	See § Repealed enactments
Repeals/revokes	See § Repealed enactments
Amended by	Prevention of Oil Pollution Act 1971; Statute Law (Repeals) Act 1974; Countryside and Rights of Way Act 2000
Repealed by	Marine and Coastal Access Act 2009

Status: Repealed

Text of statute as originally enacted

Revised text of statute as amended

The Sea Fisheries Regulation Act 1966 (c. 38) was an act of the Parliament of the United Kingdom that consolidated enactments relating to the sea fisheries of England and Wales.

== Provisions ==
=== Repealed enactments ===
Section 21(1) of the act repealed 8 enactments and revoked 1 order, listed in parts I and II of the schedule to the act, respectively.

Part I - enactments repealed
Citation	Short title	Extent of repeal
51 & 52 Vict. c. 54	Sea Fisheries Regulation Act 1888	The whole act.
54 & 55 Vict. c. 37	Fisheries Act 1891	Part II; in section 13, the words "or this Act"
57 & 58 Vict. c. 26	Sea Fisheries (Shell Fish) Regulation Act 1894	The whole act.
3 Edw. 7. c. 31	Board of Agriculture and Fisheries Act 1903	In the Schedule, Part 3
5 & 6 Geo. 5. c. 48	Fishery Harbours Act 1915	Section 3(3)
20 & 21 Geo. 5. c. 41	Sea Fisheries Regulation (Expenses) Act 1930	The whole act.
1 & 2 Geo. 6. c. 30	Sea Fish Industry Act 1938	Part V except sections 54(5), 58 and 59; section 60
1964 c. 72	Fishery Limits Act 1964	In Schedule 1, the entry relating to the Sea Fisheries Regulation Act 1888

Part II - order revoked
Citation	Title	Extent of revocation
SI 1953/773	Local Fisheries Committees Order 1953	The whole order

== Subsequent developments ==
Section 21(1) of, and the schedule to, the act were repealed by section 1 of, and part XI of the schedule to, the Statute Law (Repeals) Act 1974, which came into force on 27 June 1974.

The whole act was repealed by section 187 of the Marine and Coastal Access Act 2009 (c. 23), which came into force on 1 April 2010 in relation to Wales and 1 April 2011 in relation to England.
