= Prevention of Oil Pollution Act 1971 =

Act of the Parliament of the United Kingdom

Prevention of Oil Pollution Act 1971 (Note: Section 34(1).)
- Act of Parliament
- Parliament of the United Kingdom
- Long title: An Act to consolidate the Oil in Navigable Waters Acts 1955 to 1971 and section 5 of the Continental Shelf Act 1964.
- Citation: 1971 c. 60
- Territorial extent: United Kingdom (Note: Section 30.)

Dates
- Royal assent: 27 July 1971
- Commencement: 1 March 1973 (Note: Section 34(2). The Prevention of Oil Pollution Act 1971 (Commencement) Order 1973 (SI 1973/203).)

Other legislation
- Amends: See § Repealed enactments
- Repeals/revokes: See § Repealed enactments
- Amended by: Northern Ireland Constitution Act 1973; Criminal Procedure (Scotland) Act 1975; Petroleum and Submarine Pipe-lines Act 1975; Interpretation Act 1978; Merchant Shipping Act 1979; Criminal Justice Act 1982; Merchant Shipping (Prevention of Oil Pollution) Order 1983; Fines and Penalties (Northern Ireland) Order 1984; Prevention of Oil Pollution Act 1986; Debtors (Scotland) Act 1987; Environmental Protection Act 1990; Merchant Shipping (Registration, etc.) Act 1993; Environment Act 1995; Merchant Shipping Act 1995; Petroleum Act 1998; Pollution Prevention and Control Act 1999; Pollution Prevention and Control Act 1999; Marine and Coastal Access Act 2009; Companies Act 2006 (Consequential Amendments, Transitional Provisions and Savings) Order 2009; Legal Aid, Sentencing and Punishment of Offenders Act 2012 (Fines on Summary Conviction) Regulations 2015

Status: Amended

Text of statute as originally enacted

Revised text of statute as amended

Text of the Prevention of Oil Pollution Act 1971 as in force today (including any amendments) within the United Kingdom, from legislation.gov.uk.

The Prevention of Oil Pollution Act 1971 (c. 60) is an act of the Parliament of the United Kingdom that consolidated enactments relating to the prevention of oil pollution of navigable waters in the United Kingdom.

== Provisions ==
=== Repealed enactments ===
Section 33(1) of the act repealed 6 enactments, listed in the schedule to the act.

Enactments repealed by section 33(1)
| Citation | Short title | Extent of repeal |
|---|---|---|
| 3 & 4 Eliz. 2. c. 25 | Oil in Navigable Waters Act 1955 | The whole act. |
| 1963 c. 28 | Oil in Navigable Waters Act 1963 | The whole act. |
| 1964 c. 29 | Continental Shelf Act 1964 | Section 5. |
| 1966 c. 38 | Sea Fisheries Regulation Act 1966 | Section 21(7). |
| 1971 c. 21 | Oil in Navigable Waters Act 1971 | The whole act. |
| 1971 c. 61 | Mineral Workings (Offshore Installations) Act 1971 | Section 10(1)(c). |
