= Passengers Act 1852 =

Act of the Parliament of the United Kingdom

Passengers Act 1852 (Note: Section 2.)
- Act of Parliament
- Parliament of the United Kingdom
- Long title: An Act to amend and consolidate the Laws relating to the Carriage of Passengers by Sea.
- Citation: 15 & 16 Vict. c. 44
- Territorial extent: United Kingdom

Dates
- Royal assent: 30 June 1852
- Commencement: 1 October 1852 (Note: Section 1.)
- Repealed: 1 October 1855
Other legislation
Repeals/revokes	Passengers Act 1849; Passengers by Sea Act 1851
Amended by	Passengers Act Amendment Act 1853
Repealed by	Passengers Act 1855

Status: Repealed

Text of statute as originally enacted

The Passengers Act 1852 (15 & 16 Vict. c. 44) was an act of the Parliament of the United Kingdom that consolidated enactments related to the carriage of passengers at sea in the United Kingdom.

== Provisions ==
Section 1 of the act repealed the Passengers Act 1849 (12 & 13 Vict. c. 33) and the Passengers by Sea Act 1851 (14 & 15 Vict. c. 1).

== Subsequent developments ==
The act was described as a statute of practical utility.

Passengers Act Amendment Act 1853
- Act of Parliament
- Parliament of the United Kingdom
- Long title: An Act to amend the Passengers Act, 1852, so far as relates to the Passages of Natives of Asia or Africa, and also Passages between the Island of Ceylon and certain Parts of the East Indies.
- Citation: 16 & 17 Vict. c. 84

Dates
- Royal assent: 20 August 1853
- Commencement: 20 August 1853 (Note: The Acts of Parliament (Commencement) Act 1793.)
- Repealed: 1 January 1895
Other legislation
Amends	Passengers Act 1852
Repealed by	Merchant Shipping Act 1894

Status: Repealed

Text of statute as originally enacted

The act was amended by the Passengers Act Amendment Act 1853 (16 & 17 Vict.. c. 84).

The whole act was repealed by section 1 of the Passengers Act 1855 (18 & 19 Vict. c. 119), which came into force on 1 October 1855.
