= List of acts of the Parliament of the United Kingdom from 1971 =

This is a list of acts of the Parliament of the United Kingdom passed in 1971.

Acts passed since 1963 are cited by calendar year, as opposed to the convention used for earlier acts of citing the regnal year(s) in which the relevant parliamentary session was held. Each act passed in a respective year is given a chapter number (abbreviated "c."), denoted by Arabic numerals in the case of public general acts, lowercase Roman numerals in the case of local acts, or italicised Arabic numerals in the case of personal acts. These run as separate series.

154 acts of Parliament were passed in 1971: 81 public general acts and 73 local acts.

indicates that an act has been transcribed on Wikisource, indicates that an act is available to view at legislation.gov.uk, and indicates the location of the original act in the Parliamentary Archives.

== Public general acts ==
Short title	Citation	Royal assent
Long title
Consolidated Fund Act 1971 (repealed)	1971 c. 1	17 February 1971
An Act to apply certain sums out of the Consolidated Fund to the service of the years ending on 31st March 1971 and 1972. (Repealed by Appropriation (No. 2) Act 1974 (c. 31))
Teaching Council (Scotland) Act 1971 (repealed)	1971 c. 2	17 February 1971
An Act to enable the Secretary of State by regulations to secure the payment of fees to the General Teaching Council for Scotland for the renewal of registrations in pursuance of section 6 of the Teaching Council (Scotland) Act 1965, (Note: Teaching Council (Scotland) Act 1965 (c. 19)) by way of deduction from the salaries of persons employed by education authorities and managers of educational establishments; and for purposes connected therewith. (Repealed by Public Services Reform (General Teaching Council for Scotland) Order 2011 (SI 2011/215))
Guardianship of Minors Act 1971	1971 c. 3	17 February 1971
An Act to consolidate certain enactments relating to the guardianship and custody of minors.
Copyright (Amendment) Act 1971 (repealed)	1971 c. 4	17 February 1971
An Act to amend the Copyright Act 1956 (Note: Copyright Act 1956 (4 & 5 Eliz. 2. c. 74)) so as to make provision for the subsequent variation by the Performing Right Tribunal of orders made pursuant to section 27 of that Act. (Repealed by Copyright, Designs and Patents Act 1988 (c. 48))
Air Corporations Act 1971 (repealed)	1971 c. 5	17 February 1971
An Act to raise the limits imposed by section 16(1) of the Air Corporations Act 1967 (Note: Air Corporations Act 1967 (c. 33)) on borrowings by and investment in the British Overseas Airways Corporation. (Repealed by Civil Aviation Act 1971 (c. 75))
Civil Aviation (Declaratory Provisions) Act 1971 (repealed)	1971 c. 6	17 February 1971
An Act to make declaratory provision with respect to such a particular flight and series of flights as are mentioned in section 1(3) of the Civil Aviation (Licensing) Act 1960 (Note: Civil Aviation (Licensing) Act 1960 (8 & 9 Eliz. 2. c. 38)) and with respect to the limitations which may be imposed by virtue of section 3(5) of the Air Corporations Act 1967. (Repealed by Civil Aviation Act 1971 (c. 75))
Local Authorities (Qualification of Members) Act 1971 (repealed)	1971 c. 7	17 February 1971
An Act to amend the law relating to the qualification for nomination and election to, and membership of, local authorities in Great Britain. (Repealed by Local Government (Scotland) Act 1973 (c. 65))
Hospital Endowments (Scotland) Act 1971 (repealed)	1971 c. 8	17 February 1971
An Act to provide for the constitution of a Scottish Hospital Trust; to make provision for the transfer of endowments to that Trust and for the distribution of the income of those endowments; to extend the powers of investment of the Scottish Hospital Endowments Research Trust; and for connected purposes. (Repealed by National Health Service (Scotland) Act 1978 (c. 29))
Rolls-Royce (Purchase) Act 1971 (repealed)	1971 c. 9	17 February 1971
An Act to make provision for and in connection with the acquisition for the benefit of the Crown of any part of the undertaking and assets of Rolls-Royce Ltd. or its subsidiaries, and the carrying on of any undertaking so acquired, and for purposes connected therewith. (Repealed by Statute Law (Repeals) Act 1993 (c. 50))
Vehicles (Excise) Act 1971 (repealed)	1971 c. 10	16 March 1971
An Act to consolidate certain enactments relating to excise duties on mechanically propelled vehicles, and to the licensing and registration of such vehicles with amendments to give effect to recommendations of the Law Commission and the Scottish Law Commission. (Repealed by Vehicle Excise and Registration Act 1994 (c. 22))
Atomic Energy Authority Act 1971	1971 c. 11	16 March 1971
An Act to provide for the transfer to British Nuclear Fuels Limited and The Radiochemical Centre Limited of parts of the undertaking of the United Kingdom Atomic Energy Authority and of property, rights, liabilities and obligations appertaining to those parts of the Authority's undertaking; to make provision with respect to persons employed by the Authority and engaged in those parts of the Authority's undertaking, with respect to the control and finances of the said companies, and with respect to the application of pension schemes maintained by the Authority; to amend the provisions of the Nuclear Installations Act 1965 (Note: Nuclear Installations Act 1965 (c. 57)) relating to permits under section 2 of that Act; to make provision relating to factories, offices, building operations and other works on sites in respect of which such permits are in force; to provide for the application of security provisions where such permits are in force and also where companies are designated by the Secretary of State in connection with an agreement relating to the gas centrifuge process for producing enriched uranium; and for purposes connected with those matters.
Hydrocarbon Oil (Customs & Excise) Act 1971	1971 c. 12	16 March 1971
An Act to consolidate the enactments relating to the duties of customs and excise on hydrocarbon oil, petrol substitutes and power methylated spirits.
Mr. Speaker King's Retirement Act 1971	1971 c. 13	30 March 1971
An Act to settle and secure annuities upon the Right Honourable Horace Maybray King, and after his death upon his wife, Una King, in consideration of his eminent services.
Consolidated Fund (No. 2) Act 1971 (repealed)	1971 c. 14	30 March 1971
An Act to apply certain sums out of the Consolidated Fund to the service of the years ending on 31st March 1970, 1971 and 1972. (Repealed by Appropriation (No. 2) Act 1974 (c. 31))
Consumer Protection Act 1971 (repealed)	1971 c. 15	30 March 1971
An Act to amend section 3 of the Consumer Protection Act 1961. (Note: Consumer Protection Act 1961 (9 & 10 Eliz. 2. c. 40)) (Repealed by Consumer Safety Act 1978 (c. 38))
Coal Industry Act 1971	1971 c. 16	30 March 1971
An Act to provide further finance for the National Coal Board in respect of pit closures and for the making of payments to workers in the coal industry made redundant; to increase the limit of the Board's accumulated deficit and provide for its subsequent alteration by order of the Secretary of State; to enable the Board to borrow money otherwise than in sterling and to join in furnishing technical assistance overseas; to make further provision as to the power of the Secretary of State to give directions to the Board with respect to their activities and accounts; and for purposes connected with the matters aforesaid.
Industry Act 1971 (repealed)	1971 c. 17	8 April 1971
An Act to repeal the Industrial Reorganisation Corporation Act 1966 (Note: Industrial Reorganisation Corporation Act 1966 (c. 50)) and dissolve the Industrial Reorganisation Corporation; to terminate the power to make industrial investment schemes under the Industrial Expansion Act 1968 (Note: Industrial Expansion Act 1968 (c. 32)) otherwise than for the purpose of revoking or varying any such scheme made before the passing of this Act; and for purposes connected with those matters. (Repealed by Statute Law (Repeals) Act 1986 (c. 12))
Land Commission (Dissolution) Act 1971 (repealed)	1971 c. 18	8 April 1971
An Act to abolish betterment levy and dissolve the Land Commission; and for purposes connected therewith. (Repealed by Statute Law (Repeals) Act 1998 (c. 43))
Carriage of Goods by Sea Act 1971	1971 c. 19	8 April 1971
An Act to amend the law with respect to the carriage of goods by sea.
Mines Management Act 1971 (repealed)	1971 c. 20	8 April 1971
An Act to amend the law as to the management and control of mines by making provision with respect to the appointment of persons to assist the manager of a mine in the discharge of his statutory responsibilities, and with respect to under-managers, and for purposes connected therewith. (Repealed by Management and Administration of Safety and Health at Mines Regulations 1993 (SI 1993/1897))
Oil in Navigable Waters Act 1971 (repealed)	1971 c. 21	8 April 1971
An Act to amend the Oil in Navigable Waters Acts 1955 (Note: Oil in Navigable Waters Act 1955 (3 & 4 Eliz. 2. c. 25)) and 1963 (Note: Oil in Navigable Waters Act 1963 (c. 28)) and section 5 of the Continental Shelf Act 1964; (Note: Continental Shelf Act 1964 (c. 29)) to make further provision for preventing pollution of the sea by oil; and for purposes connected therewith. (Repealed by Prevention of Oil Pollution Act 1971 (c. 60))
Animals Act 1971	1971 c. 22	12 May 1971
An Act to make provision with respect to civil liability for damage done by animals and with respect to the protection of livestock from dogs; and for purposes connected with those matters.
Courts Act 1971	1971 c. 23	12 May 1971
An Act to make further provision as respects the Supreme Court (Note: Although the term "Supreme Court" was amended to "Senior Courts" in each place it occurs in the act by the Constitutional Reform Act 2005 (c. 4) on 1 October 2009, the long title was exempted from amendment.) and county courts, judges and juries, to establish a Crown Court as part of the Supreme Court to try indictments and exercise certain other jurisdiction, to abolish courts of assize and certain other courts and to deal with their jurisdiction and other consequential matters, and to amend in other respects the law about courts and court proceedings.
Coinage Act 1971	1971 c. 24	12 May 1971
An Act to consolidate, so far as they are part of the law of the United Kingdom, the Coinage Acts 1870 to 1946 and certain other enactments relating to coinage, with amendments to give effect to recommendations of the Law Commission and the Scottish Law Commission.
Administration of Estates Act 1971	1971 c. 25	12 May 1971
An Act to provide for the recognition, without resealing, of certain grants of administration and confirmations throughout the United Kingdom; to allow for the inclusion of real estate in any part of the United Kingdom in the inventory of the estate of a person dying domiciled in Scotland; to amend the law with respect to the grant of administration by the High Court and resealing by that Court of administration granted outside the United Kingdom and to exempt from stamp duty guarantees given under the law so amended; to make provision with respect to the duties and rights of personal representatives; and for connected purposes.
Betting, Gaming and Lotteries (Amendment) Act 1971 (repealed)	1971 c. 26	12 May 1971
An Act to amend the provisions of the Betting, Gaming and Lotteries Act 1963 (Note: Betting, Gaming and Lotteries Act 1963 (c. 2)) relating to days on which betting is permitted on tracks; and for connected purposes. (Repealed by Betting, Gaming and Lotteries (Amendment) Act 1985 (c. 18))
Powers of Attorney Act 1971	1971 c. 27	12 May 1971
An Act to make new provision in relation to powers of attorney and the delegation by trustees of their trusts, powers and discretions.
Rent (Scotland) Act 1971	1971 c. 28	12 May 1971
An Act to consolidate in relation to Scotland the Rent and Mortgage Interest Restrictions Acts 1920 to 1939, the Rent of Furnished Houses Control (Scotland) Act 1943, (Note: Rent of Furnished Houses Control (Scotland) Act 1943 (6 & 7 Geo. 6. c. 44)) the Landlord and Tenant (Rent Control) Act 1949, (Note: Landlord and Tenant (Rent Control) Act 1949 (12, 13 & 14 Geo. 6. c. 40)) Part II of the Housing (Repairs and Rents) (Scotland) Act 1954, (Note: Housing (Repairs and Rents) (Scotland) Act 1954 (2 & 3 Eliz. 2. c. 50)) the Rent Act 1957, (Note: Rent Act 1957 (5 & 6 Eliz. 2. c. 25)) the Rent Act 1965 (Note: Rent Act 1965 (c. 75)) (except Part III thereof), Part IV of the Housing (Scotland) Act 1969 (Note: Housing (Scotland) Act 1969 (c. 34)) and other related enactments.
National Savings Bank Act 1971	1971 c. 29	12 May 1971
An Act to consolidate certain enactments relating to the National Savings Bank, with amendments to give effect to recommendations of the Law Commission and the Scottish Law Commission.
Unsolicited Goods and Services Act 1971	1971 c. 30	12 May 1971
An Act to make provision for the greater protection of persons receiving unsolicited goods, and to amend the law with respect to charges for entries in directories.
Interest on Damages (Scotland) Act 1971	1971 c. 31	12 May 1971
An Act to amend the Interest on Damages (Scotland) Act 1958 (Note: Interest on Damages (Scotland) Act 1958 (6 & 7 Eliz. 2. c. 61)) by extending the power of the courts to order payment of interest on damages.
Attachment of Earnings Act 1971	1971 c. 32	12 May 1971
An Act to consolidate the enactments relating to the attachment of earnings as a means of enforcing the discharge of monetary obligations.
Armed Forces Act 1971	1971 c. 33	27 May 1971
An Act to continue the Army Act 1955 (Note: Army Act 1955 (3 & 4 Eliz. 2. c. 18)) and the Air Force Act 1955, (Note: Air Force Act 1955 (3 & 4 Eliz. 2. c. 19)) to limit the duration of the Naval Discipline Act 1957, (Note: Naval Discipline Act 1957 (5 & 6 Eliz. 2. c. 53)) and to amend those Acts and other enactments relating to the armed forces.
Water Resources Act 1971 (repealed)	1971 c. 34	27 May 1971
An Act to make further provision with respect to the discharge of water by or by agreement with river authorities, and for connected purposes. (Repealed by Water Act 1989 (c. 15))
Dangerous Litter Act 1971 (repealed)	1971 c. 35	27 May 1971
An Act to amend the Litter Act 1958 (Note: Litter Act 1958 (6 & 7 Eliz. 2. c. 34)) so as to make better provision for the abatement of dangerous litter; to empower local authorities to promote the abatement of litter by means of publicity; and for purposes connected therewith. (Repealed by Litter Act 1983 (c. 35))
Motor Vehicles (Passenger Insurance) Act 1971 (repealed)	1971 c. 36	27 May 1971
An Act to amend the Road Traffic Act 1960 (Note: Road Traffic Act 1960 (8 & 9 Eliz. 2. c. 16)) so as to require users of motor vehicles to be insured in respect of liability for death or bodily injury to passengers; and for connected purposes. (Repealed by Road Traffic Act 1972 (c. 20))
Welsh National Opera Company Act 1971 (repealed)	1971 c. 37	27 May 1971
An Act to make further provision for contributions by local authorities in Wales (including Monmouthshire) towards the expenses of the Welsh National Opera Company. (Repealed by Statute Law (Repeals) Act 2004 (c. 14))
Misuse of Drugs Act 1971	1971 c. 38	27 May 1971
An Act to make new provision with respect to dangerous or otherwise harmful drugs and related matters, and for purposes connected therewith.
Rating Act 1971	1971 c. 39	27 May 1971
An Act to extend the provisions relating to the exemption from rating of land and buildings used in connection with agriculture.
Fire Precautions Act 1971 (repealed)	1971 c. 40	27 May 1971
An Act to make further provision for the protection of persons from fire risks; and for purposes connected therewith. (Repealed by Fire (Scotland) Act 2005 (Consequential Modifications and Savings) Order 2006 (SSI 2006/475))
Highways Act 1971 (repealed)	1971 c. 41	1 July 1971
An Act to make further provision with respect to highways, streets and bridges in England and Wales, including provisions with respect to means of access to premises from highways, provisions amending section 49 of the Public Health Act 1961, (Note: Public Health Act 1961 (9 & 10 Eliz. 2. c. 64)) provisions authorising the provision of picnic sites and public conveniences for the benefit of users of certain highways, provisions authorising the provision of facilities for purposes connected with the transport of goods by road, provisions amending the law about the recording of public rights of way, and related provisions amending the law of town and country planning. (Repealed by Highways Act 1980 (c. 66))
Education (Scotland) Act 1971 (repealed)	1971 c. 42	1 July 1971
An Act to re-enact with modifications certain provisions relating to free education; to restore to education authorities the power to charge fees in a limited number of schools; to make provision in respect of fees to be charged for outwith-area pupils; and for connected purposes. (Repealed by Education (Scotland) Act 1980 (c. 44))
Law Reform (Miscellaneous Provisions) Act 1971	1971 c. 43	1 July 1971
An Act to extend in certain cases the time limit for bringing legal proceedings where damages are claimed which consist of or include damages for personal injuries or in respect of a person's death, and to amend accordingly the Limitation Act 1963; (Note: Limitation Act 1963 (c. 47)) to provide that in assessing damages for widows in actions arising from the death of their husbands, remarriage and prospects of remarriage shall be left out of account; to repeal section 19 of the Administration of Justice Act 1965; (Note: Administration of Justice Act 1965 (c. 2)) and for purposes connected therewith.
Nullity of Marriage Act 1971 (repealed)	1971 c. 44	1 July 1971
An Act to restate, with certain alterations, the grounds on which a marriage is void or voidable and the bars to the grant of a decree of nullity on the ground that a marriage is voidable; to alter the effect of decrees of nullity in respect of voidable marriages; and to abolish certain remaining bars to the grant of matrimonial relief. (Repealed by Matrimonial Causes Act 1973 (c. 18))
Redemption of Standard Securities (Scotland) Act 1971	1971 c. 45	1 July 1971
An Act to amend the provisions of the Conveyancing and Feudal Reform (Scotland) Act 1970 (Note: Conveyancing and Feudal Reform (Scotland) Act 1970 (c. 35)) relating to the redemption of standard securities; to make provision as respects Scotland in relation to the operation of section 89 of the Companies Act 1948; (Note: Companies Act 1948 (11 & 12 Geo. 6. c. 38)) and for connected purposes.
Shipbuilding Industry Act 1971 (repealed)	1971 c. 46	1 July 1971
An Act to amend section 7 of the Shipbuilding Industry Act 1967 (Note: Shipbuilding Industry Act 1967 (c. 40)) by raising the limit on the liability which the Secretary of State may assume in respect of guarantees under the section. (Repealed by Industry Act 1972 (c. 63))
Wild Creatures and Forest Laws Act 1971	1971 c. 47	1 July 1971
An Act to abolish certain rights of Her Majesty to wild creatures and certain related rights and franchises; to abrogate the forest law (subject to exceptions); and to repeal enactments relating to those rights and franchises and to forests and the forest law; and for connected purposes.
Criminal Damage Act 1971	1971 c. 48	14 July 1971
An Act to revise the law of England and Wales as to offences of damage to property, and to repeal or amend as respects the United Kingdom certain enactments relating to such offences; and for connected purposes.
Rural Water Supplies and Sewerage Act 1971 (repealed)	1971 c. 49	14 July 1971
An Act to remove the limit imposed by subsection (5) of section 1 of the Rural Water Supplies and Sewerage Act 1944, (Note: Rural Water Supplies and Sewerage Act 1944 (7 & 8 Geo. 6. c. 26)) as amended, on contributions under that section towards the expenses of local authorities in England and Wales. (Repealed for England and Wales by Water Consolidation (Consequential Provisions) Act 1991 (c. 60) and for Scotland by Local Government etc. (Scotland) Act 1994 (c. 39))
National Insurance Act 1971 (repealed)	1971 c. 50	14 July 1971
An Act to amend the provisions of the National Insurance Acts 1965 to 1970, the National Insurance (Industrial Injuries) Acts 1965 to 1969 and the Industrial Injuries and Diseases (Old Cases) Acts 1967 (Note: Industrial Injuries and Diseases (Old Cases) Act 1967 (c. 34)) and 1969 (Note: National Insurance Act 1969 (c. 44)) as to contributions and benefits; to make provision for invalidity benefit for the chronic sick and for a retirement pension and age addition for certain persons over the age of eighty; to make new provision in relation to polygamous marriages for the purposes of any of the said Acts or of the Family Allowances Act 1965; (Note: Family Allowances Act 1965 (c. 53)) and for purposes connected with those matters. (Repealed by Social Security (Consequential Provisions) Act 1975 (c. 18))
Investment and Building Grants Act 1971 (repealed)	1971 c. 51	27 July 1971
An Act to preclude, subject to certain exceptions, the making of grants under Part I of the Industrial Development Act 1966 (Note: Industrial Development Act 1966 (c. 34)) in respect of expenditure incurred on or after 27th October 1970; to make further provision with respect to grants under section 3 of the Local Employment Act 1960; (Note: Local Employment Act 1960 (8 & 9 Eliz. 2. c. 18)) and for connected purposes. (Repealed by Statute Law (Repeals) Act 1993 (c. 50))
Statute Law (Repeals) Act 1971 (repealed)	1971 c. 52	27 July 1971
An Act to promote the reform of the statute law by the repeal, in accordance with recommendations of the Law Commission and the Scottish Law Commission, of certain enactments which are no longer of practical utility. (Repealed by Statute Law (Repeals) Act 1998 (c. 43))
Recognition of Divorces and Legal Separations Act 1971 (repealed)	1971 c. 53	27 July 1971
An Act to amend the law relating to the recognition of divorces and legal separations. (Repealed by Family Law Act 1986 (c. 55))
Land Registration and Land Charges Act 1971	1971 c. 54	27 July 1971
An Act to amend the Land Registration Acts 1925 to 1966; to amend the Land Charges Act 1925 (Note: Land Charges Act 1925 (15 & 16 Geo. 5. c. 22)) and related enactments; and for connected purposes.
Law Reform (Jurisdiction in Delict) (Scotland) Act 1971 (repealed)	1971 c. 55	27 July 1971
An Act to extend the jurisdiction of the Court of Session and the sheriff court in Scotland in proceedings founded on delict. (Repealed by Civil Jurisdiction and Judgments Act 1982 (c. 27))
Pensions (Increase) Act 1971	1971 c. 56	27 July 1971
An Act to replace the Pensions (Increase) Acts 1920 to 1969 and make further provision for increases and supplements to be paid on certain pensions and related benefits.
Pool Competitions Act 1971 (repealed)	1971 c. 57	27 July 1971
An Act to make provisions as respects certain competitions conducted by registered pool promoters. (Repealed by Statute Law (Repeals) Act 2013 (c. 2))
Sheriff Courts (Scotland) Act 1971	1971 c. 58	27 July 1971
An Act to amend the law with respect to sheriff courts in Scotland, and for purposes connected therewith.
Merchant Shipping (Oil Pollution) Act 1971 (repealed)	1971 c. 59	27 July 1971
An Act to make provision with respect to civil liability for oil pollution by merchant ships; and for connected purposes. (Repealed by Merchant Shipping Act 1995 (c. 21))
Prevention of Oil Pollution Act 1971	1971 c. 60	27 July 1971
An Act to consolidate the Oil in Navigable Waters Acts 1955 to 1971 and section 5 of the Continental Shelf Act 1964.
Mineral Workings (Offshore Installations) Act 1971	1971 c. 61	27 July 1971
An Act to provide for the safety, health and welfare of persons on installations concerned with the underwater exploitation and exploration of mineral resources in the waters in or surrounding the United Kingdom, and generally for the safety of such installations and the prevention of accidents on or near them.
Tribunals and Inquiries Act 1971 (repealed)	1971 c. 62	27 July 1971
An Act to consolidate the Tribunals and Inquiries Acts 1958 (Note: Tribunals and Inquiries Act 1958 (6 & 7 Eliz. 2. c. 66)) and 1966 (Note: Tribunals and Inquiries Act 1966 (c. 43)) as amended. (Repealed by Tribunals and Inquiries Act 1992 (c. 53))
Anguilla Act 1971 (repealed)	1971 c. 63	27 July 1971
An Act to make further provision with respect to Anguilla. (Repealed by Anguilla Act 1980 (c. 67))
Diplomatic and other Privileges Act 1971	1971 c. 64	27 July 1971
An Act to make further provision with respect to diplomatic and related privileges.
Licensing (Abolition of State Management) Act 1971 (repealed)	1971 c. 65	27 July 1971
An Act to remove the restriction on the sale and supply, otherwise than by the Secretary of State, of intoxicating liquor in the Carlisle district or of exciseable liquor in the State management districts in Scotland; to provide for the disposal of property held by the Secretary of State for the purposes of Part V of the Licensing Act 1964 (Note: Licensing Act 1964 (c. 26)) or Part V of the Licensing (Scotland) Act 1959 (Note: Licensing (Scotland) Act 1959 (7 & 8 Eliz. 2. c. 51)) and for the repeal of those provisions. (Repealed by Statute Law (Repeals) Act 1986 (c. 12))
Friendly Societies Act 1971	1971 c. 66	27 July 1971
An Act to amend the law relating to societies and branches registered under the Friendly Societies Act 1896, (Note: Friendly Societies Act 1896 (59 & 60 Vict. c. 25)) to make other amendments to facilitate the consolidation of the Friendly Societies Acts 1896 to 1968, and for purposes connected therewith.
Appropriation Act 1971 (repealed)	1971 c. 67	5 August 1971
An Act to apply a sum out of the Consolidated Fund to the service of the year ending on 31st March 1972, and to appropriate the further supplies granted in this Session of Parliament. (Repealed by Appropriation (No. 2) Act 1974 (c. 31))
Finance Act 1971	1971 c. 68	5 August 1971
An Act to grant certain duties, to alter other duties, and to amend the law relating to the National Debt and the Public Revenue, and to make further provision in connection with Finance.
Medicines Act 1971	1971 c. 69	5 August 1971
An Act to make further provision as to the fees payable for the purposes of Part II of the Medicines Act 1968. (Note: Medicines Act 1968 (c. 67))
Hijacking Act 1971 (repealed)	1971 c. 70	5 August 1971
An Act to give effect to the Convention for the Suppression of Unlawful Seizure of Aircraft; and for connected purposes. (Repealed by Aviation Security Act 1982 (c. 36))
Mineral Workings Act 1971	1971 c. 71	5 August 1971
An Act to make further provision in relation to contributions to and payments out of the Ironstone Restoration Fund and to abolish the Advisory Committee on Ironstone Restoration.
Industrial Relations Act 1971 (repealed)	1971 c. 72	5 August 1971
An Act to amend the law relating to employers and workers and to organisations of employers and organisations of workers; to provide for the establishment of a National Industrial Relations Court and for extending the jurisdiction of industrial tribunals; to provide for the appointment of a Chief Registrar of Trade Unions and Employers' Associations, and of assistant registrars, and for establishing a Commission on Industrial Relations as a statutory body; and for purposes connected with those matters. (Repealed by Trade Union and Labour Relations Act 1974 (c. 52))
Social Security Act 1971 (repealed)	1971 c. 73	5 August 1971
An Act to amend the law relating to benefit under the Ministry of Social Security Act 1966 (Note: Ministry of Social Security Act 1966 (c. 20)) and to certain benefits under the National Insurance Act 1965 (Note: National Insurance Act 1965 (c. 51)) and the National Insurance (Industrial Injuries) Act 1965; (Note: National Insurance (Industrial Injuries) Act 1965 (c. 52)) to increase the penalties for failure to pay contributions under the said Acts of 1965; to abolish local advisory committees under the said Act of 1966; and for purposes connected with those matters. (Repealed by Northern Ireland Constitution Act 1973 (c. 36), Social Security Act 1973 (c. 38), Social Security (Consequential Provisions) Act 1975 (c. 18), House of Commons Disqualification Act 1975 (c. 24) and Supplementary Benefits Act 1976 (c. 71))
Education (Milk) Act 1971 (repealed)	1971 c. 74	5 August 1971
An Act to restrict the duty of education authorities to provide milk for pupils at educational establishments maintained by them or under their management and make further provision with respect to their power to do so; to restrict their power to secure provision of milk for pupils at other educational establishments; and for purposes connected therewith. (Repealed by Education Act 1980 (c. 20))
Civil Aviation Act 1971 (repealed)	1971 c. 75	5 August 1971
An Act to establish a public authority concerned with civil aviation and to make provision as to the functions of the authority; to make further provision for regulating civil aviation; to establish a corporation with functions which include the function of controlling the activities of the British Overseas Airways Corporation and the British European Airways Corporation and to authorise in certain circumstances the dissolution of either of those Corporations; and for purposes connected with the matters aforesaid. (Repealed by Civil Aviation Act 1982 (c. 16))
Housing Act 1971 (repealed)	1971 c. 76	5 August 1971
An Act to increase the amount of financial assistance available under Parts I and II of the Housing Act 1969, (Note: Housing Act 1969 (c. 33)) and under certain provisions of the Housing (Financial Provisions) (Scotland) Act 1968 (Note: Housing (Financial Provisions) (Scotland) Act 1968 (c. 31)) and of the Housing (Scotland) Act 1969, as respects expenditure incurred in local government areas wholly or partly within development areas, or intermediate areas under section 1 of the Local Employment Act 1970. (Note: Local Employment Act 1970 (c. 7)) (Repealed by Housing (Consequential Provisions) Act 1985 (c. 71))
Immigration Act 1971	1971 c. 77	28 October 1971
An Act to amend and replace the present immigration laws, to make certain related changes in the citizenship law and enable help to be given to those wishing to return abroad, and for purposes connected therewith.
Town and Country Planning Act 1971 (repealed)	1971 c. 78	28 October 1971
An Act to consolidate certain enactments relating to town and country planning in England and Wales with amendments to give effect to recommendations of the Law Commission. (Repealed by Planning (Consequential Provisions) Act 1990 (c. 11))
Consolidated Fund (No. 3) Act 1971 (repealed)	1971 c. 79	16 December 1971
An Act to apply certain sums out of the Consolidated Fund to the service of the years ending on 31st March 1972 and 1973. (Repealed by Appropriation (No. 2) Act 1974 (c. 31))
Banking and Financial Dealings Act 1971	1971 c. 80	16 December 1971
An Act to make new provision in place of the Bank Holidays Act 1871, (Note: Bank Holidays Act 1871 (34 & 35 Vict. c. 17)) to confer power to suspend financial and other dealings on bank holidays or other days, and to amend the law relating to bills of exchange and promissory notes with reference to the maturity of bills and notes and other matters affected by the closing of banks on Saturdays, and for purposes connected therewith.
New Towns Act 1971 (repealed)	1971 c. 81	16 December 1971
An Act to raise the limit on advances imposed by section 43 of the New Towns Act 1965, (Note: New Towns Act 1965 (c. 59)) as amended by subsequent enactments. (Repealed by New Towns Act 1975 (c. 42))

== Local acts ==
Short title	Citation	Royal assent
Long title
Glasgow Corporation (Finance &c.) Order Confirmation Act 1971	1971 c. i	17 February 1971
An Act to confirm a Provisional Order under the Private Legislation Procedure (Scotland) Act 1936, (Note: Private Legislation Procedure (Scotland) Act 1936 (26 Geo. 5 & 1 Edw. 8. c. 52)) relating to Glasgow Corporation (Finance &c.).
	Glasgow Corporation (Finance &c.) Order 1971 Provisional Order to confer further powers on the Corporation of the city of Glasgow in relation to the finances of the city; to make provision for the execution of documents; and for other purposes.	
Paisley Corporation (Cart Navigation) Order Confirmation Act 1971	1971 c. ii	17 February 1971
An Act to confirm a Provisional Order under the Private Legislation Procedure (Scotland) Act 1936, relating to Paisley Corporation (Cart Navigation).
	Paisley Corporation (Cart Navigation) Order 1971 Provisional Order to authorise the partial abandonment of the Cart Navigation by the provost, magistrates and councillors of the Burgh of Paisley; to extinguish rights of navigation over part of the said Navigation; and for purposes connected therewith.	
Ministry of Housing and Local Government Provisional Orders Confirmation (Melton Mowbray and Sheffield) Act 1971	1971 c. iii	17 February 1971
An Act to confirm Provisional Orders of the Minister of Housing and Local Government relating to the urban district of Melton Mowbray and the city of Sheffield.
	Urban District of Melton Mowbray Order 1970 (Note: Although passed in 1971, the short title specifies the year 1970.) Provisional Order amending a Local Act. (Note: Melton Mowbray Cattle Market, &c. Act 1869 (32 & 33 Vict. c. xxvii))	
	Sheffield Order 1970 Provisional Order amending Local Enactments.	
Amoco (U.K.) Act 1971	1971 c. iv	17 February 1971
An Act to empower Amoco (U.K.) Limited to construct works and to acquire lands; and for other purposes.
Falmouth Container Terminal Act 1971	1971 c. v	17 February 1971
An Act to empower Falmouth Container Terminal Limited to construct works; and for other purposes.
National Trust Act 1971	1971 c. vi	17 February 1971
An Act to amend the constitution of the National Trust for Places of Historic Interest or Natural Beauty; to amend the National Trust Acts 1907 to 1953; to confer further powers on the said National Trust; and for other purposes.
Nottingham Corporation Act 1971 (repealed)	1971 c. vii	17 February 1971
An Act to confer further powers on the lord mayor, aldermen and citizens of the city of Nottingham and county of the same city; to make further provision with reference to Wilford Bridge over the river Trent in the city; to make further provision for the local government and finances of the city; and for other purposes. (Repealed by Statute Law (Repeals) Act 1995)
Berkshire County Council Act 1971 (repealed)	1971 c. viii	17 February 1971
An Act to confer further powers on the Berkshire County Council and local authorities in the administrative county of Berkshire in relation to amenities, lands and highways and the local government, improvement, health and finances of the county; to make further provision for the superannuation of employees; and for other purposes. (Repealed by Berkshire Act 1986 (c. ii))
Bristol Corporation (General Powers) Act 1971	1971 c. ix	17 February 1971
An Act to confer further powers on the lord mayor, aldermen and burgesses of the city of Bristol, to make further provision with regard to the local government, welfare, improvement and finances of the city; and for other purposes.
Mersey Docks and Harbour Board Act 1971	1971 c. x	17 February 1971
An Act to confer further powers on the Mersey Docks and Harbour Board; and for other purposes.
Buckinghamshire County Council Act 1971	1971 c. xi	16 March 1971
An Act to confer further powers on the County Council and on local authorities in the administrative county of Buckingham in relation to lands, and the local government, improvement, health and finances of the county and of the boroughs and districts therein; and for other purposes.
Southampton Corporation Act 1971	1971 c. xii	16 March 1971
An Act to repeal certain local enactments relating to Southampton Common; to make further provision for the improvement, local government and finance of the city and county of the city of Southampton; and for other purposes.
Trent and Lincolnshire Water Act 1971	1971 c. xiii	30 March 1971
An Act to provide for the augmentation of the water resources of the area of the Lincolnshire River Authority; to authorise the Lincolnshire River Authority, the Trent River Authority and the North Lindsey Water Board to construct water works and to acquire lands; and for other purposes.
Ipswich Dock Act 1971	1971 c. xiv	30 March 1971
An Act to authorise the Ipswich Dock Commission to construct further works; and for other purposes.
Teesside Corporation (General Powers) Act 1971	1971 c. xv	30 March 1971
An Act to re-enact with amendments and to extend certain local enactments in force in the county borough of Teesside; to make better provision for the health, local government and improvement of the borough; to confer further powers upon the mayor, aldermen and burgesses of that borough; and for other purposes.
Cumberland River Authority Act 1971	1971 c. xvi	30 March 1971
An Act to provide as a temporary measure for the augmentation of the flow of the river Derwent by abstraction from Bassenthwaite Lake; to authorise the Cumberland River Authority to construct works and acquire lands; and for other purposes.
Teesside Corporation Act 1971	1971 c. xvii	30 March 1971
An Act to re-enact with amendments certain local enactments in force in the county borough of Teesside relating to undertakings of the Corporation; to confer further powers upon the mayor, aldermen and burgesses of that borough; and for other purposes.
British Waterways Act 1971	1971 c. xviii	30 March 1971
An Act to make provision for regulating the use of pleasure boats and houseboats on certain of the inland waterways of the British Waterways Board and for making charges therefor; to confer further powers on the Board; and for other purposes.
Essex County Council Act 1971	1971 c. xix	30 March 1971
An Act to confer further powers on the Essex County Council and local authorities in the county of Essex in relation to highways and the local government, improvement, health and finances of the county; to make further provision for the superannuation of employees; to authorise the Basildon Urban District Council to acquire lands; and for other purposes.
British Aluminium (Saltburn Pier) Order Confirmation Act 1971 (repealed)	1971 c. xx	8 April 1971
An Act to confirm a Provisional Order under the Private Legislation Procedure (Scotland) Act 1936, relating to British Aluminium (Saltburn Pier). (Repealed by Cromarty Firth Port Authority Harbour Revision Order 1997 (SI 1997/1953))
	British Aluminium (Saltburn Pier) Order 1971 Provisional Order to confer powers on The British Aluminium Company, Limited with respect to their pier at Saltburn; and for purposes connected therewith.	
Plymouth Corporation Act 1971 (repealed)	1971 c. xxi	12 May 1971
An Act to confer powers upon the lord mayor, aldermen and citizens of the city of Plymouth with regard to finance; and for other purposes. (Repealed by Plymouth City Council Act 1987 (c. iv))
Co-operative Bank Act 1971	1971 c. xxii	12 May 1971
An Act to provide for the transfer to Co-operative Bank Limited of the banking business of Co-operative Wholesale Society Limited; and for other purposes incidental thereto and consequential thereon.
National Westminster Bank (North Central Finance & Lombard Banking) Act 1971	1971 c. xxiii	12 May 1971
An Act to provide for the transfer to Lombard Banking Limited of the undertakings of Consumer Credit Corporation, Limited, Lombank Limited, Lombank Leasing Limited, North Central Finance Limited, North Central Finance (London) Limited, North Central Finance (Southern Counties) Limited, North Central Finance (Stanton) Limited, North Central Acceptances Limited, North Central Acceptances (London) Limited, North Central Acceptances (Southern Counties) Limited and North Central Acceptances (Stanton) Limited; and for other purposes incidental thereto and consequential thereon.
Australian, Mercantile, Land and Finance Company, Limited Act 1971	1971 c. xxiv	12 May 1971
An Act to make provision for the transfer to the State of New South Wales in the Commonwealth of Australia of the registered office of Australian, Mercantile, Land and Finance Company, Limited; for the cesser of application to that company of provisions of the Companies Acts, 1948 to 1967; and for other purposes incidental thereto.
John Hollis Trust for Employees (Amendment) Act 1971	1971 c. xxv	12 May 1971
An Act to vary the trusts of a settlement created by John Hollis for the benefit of employees of Hollis Bros. & E.S.A. Limited; to modify certain of the provisions of the settlement; to confer powers on the trustees of that settlement; and for other purposes.
New Broken Hill Consolidated Limited Act 1971 (Note: The corresponding act in the Australia was the New Broken Hill Consolidated Limited Act 1971 (No. 8110 (Vic)).)	1971 c. xxvi	12 May 1971
An Act to make provision for the transfer to the Commonwealth of Australia of the registered office of New Broken Hill Consolidated Limited; for the cesser of application to that company of provisions of the Companies Acts 1948 to 1967; and for other purposes incidental thereto.
Dunbarton County Council Order Confirmation Act 1971 (repealed)	1971 c. xxvii	27 May 1971
An Act to confirm a Provisional Order under the Private Legislation Procedure (Scotland) Act 1936, relating to Dunbarton County Council. (Repealed by Statute Law (Repeals) Act 1995)
	Dunbarton County Council Order 1971 Provisional Order to confer further powers on the county council of the county of Dunbarton in relation to the finances of the said county; to make further provision for the investment of moneys forming part of the superannuation fund maintained by the said county council; and for other purposes.	
Greater London Council (General Powers) Act 1971	1971 c. xxviii	27 May 1971
An Act to confer further powers upon the Greater London Council and other authorities; and for other purposes.
Oldham Corporation Act 1971	1971 c. xxix	1 July 1971
An Act to confer further powers on the mayor, aldermen and burgesses of the county borough of Oldham in relation to the finances of the county borough; and for other purposes.
Southampton Corporation (Southampton Common) Act 1971	1971 c. xxx	1 July 1971
An Act to confer powers on the mayor, aldermen and citizens of the city and county of the city of Southampton with regard to Southampton Common; and for other purposes.
Great Southern Cemetery and Crematorium Company Act 1971	1971 c. xxxi	1 July 1971
An Act to authorise the Great Southern Cemetery and Crematorium Company, Limited to sell certain lands belonging to the said Company free from restrictions; to authorise the erection of buildings thereon; and for other purposes.
Lancashire County Council (General Powers) Act 1971 (repealed)	1971 c. xxxii	1 July 1971
An Act to make further provision as to the chairmen and deputy chairmen of courts of quarter sessions holden for the county palatine of Lancaster; to confer further powers on the county council of the administrative county of the county palatine of Lancaster and on local authorities in relation to the local government, improvement, health and finances of the said county; and for other purposes. (Repealed by County of Lancashire Act 1984 (c. xxi))
Torbay Corporation Act 1971	1971 c. xxxiii	14 July 1971
An Act to re-enact with amendments and to extend certain local enactments in force in the county borough of Torbay; to make better provision for the health, local government, improvement and finances of that borough; to confer further powers upon the mayor, aldermen and burgesses of that borough; and for other purposes.
Mersey Docks and Harbour Board (Ore Berth) Act 1971	1971 c. xxxiv	14 July 1971
An Act to authorise the Mersey Docks and Harbour Board to construct further works; and for other purposes.
Luton Corporation Act 1971 (repealed)	1971 c. xxxv	14 July 1971
An Act to enable the mayor, aldermen and burgesses of the county borough of Luton to make grants towards the cost of insulating houses against noise attributable to the use of Luton Airport; to confer further powers upon the Corporation; and for other purposes. (Repealed by Luton Borough Council Act 1985 (c. xi))
Surrey County Council Act 1971 (repealed)	1971 c. xxxvi	14 July 1971
An Act to confer further powers on the Surrey County Council and on local authorities in the administrative county of Surrey in relation to lands, amenities and highways and the local government, improvement and finances of the county; and for other purposes. (Repealed by Surrey Act 1985 (c. iii))
Edinburgh Corporation Order Confirmation Act 1971	1971 c. xxxvii	27 July 1971
An Act to confirm a Provisional Order under the Private Legislation Procedure (Scotland) Act 1936, relating to Edinburgh Corporation.
	Edinburgh Corporation Order 1971 Provisional Order to authorise the Corporation of the city of Edinburgh to acquire lands; to construct new sewers within the city and to provide sewage treatment works; to enact provisions with regard to the disposal of sewage effluent; to confer further powers on the Corporation in relation to the finances of the Corporation; to borrow money for the purposes of the Order; and for other purposes.	
Lanarkshire County Council Order Confirmation Act 1971 (repealed)	1971 c. xxxviii	27 July 1971
An Act to confirm a Provisional Order under the Private Legislation Procedure (Scotland) Act 1936, relating to Lanarkshire County Council. (Repealed by Statute Law (Repeals) Act 1998 (c. 43))
	Lanarkshire County Council Order 1971 Provisional Order to confer on the Lanarkshire County Council further powers with respect to the local government and finances of the county; to make further provision for the investment of the superannuation fund maintained by the County Council; and for other purposes.	
Lerwick Harbour Order Confirmation Act 1971	1971 c. xxxix	27 July 1971
An Act to confirm a Provisional Order under the Private Legislation Procedure (Scotland) Act 1936, relating to Lerwick Harbour.
	Lerwick Harbour Order 1971 Provisional Order to authorise the Trustees of the Port and Harbour of Lerwick to carry out works for the improvement of the harbour and to borrow money; and for other purposes.	
London Transport Act 1971	1971 c. xl	27 July 1971
An Act to empower the London Transport Executive to construct works and to acquire lands; to extend the time for the compulsory purchase of certain lands; to confer further powers on the Executive and London Country Bus Services Limited; and for other purposes.
Kesteven County Council Act 1971	1971 c. xli	27 July 1971
An Act to confer further powers on the county council of Lincoln, Parts of Kesteven, in relation to the finances of the county; to confer further powers on the county council and on local authorities and other public authorities with regard to the superannuation of and payment of compensation to or on behalf of employees and to the investment of superannuation funds; and for other purposes.
Bradford Corporation Act 1971 (repealed)	1971 c. xlii	27 July 1971
An Act to provide for the making of agreements between the lord mayor, aldermen and citizens of the city of Bradford and the Yorkshire Ouse and Hull River Authority with respect to the construction and use of certain waterworks and the discharge of water therefrom; to confer further powers upon the Corporation in respect of their water undertaking; to alter the name of the said Authority; and for other purposes. (Repealed by West Yorkshire Act 1980 (c. xiv))
Bristol Corporation Act 1971	1971 c. xliii	27 July 1971
An Act to authorise the lord mayor, aldermen and burgesses of the city of Bristol to construct works and acquire lands; to authorise the abandonment of part of the City Docks of the Corporation; to confer further powers on the Corporation; and for other purposes.
Teesside Corporation (General Powers) (No. 2) Act 1971	1971 c. xliv	27 July 1971
An Act to re-enact with amendments and to extend certain local enactments in force in the county borough of Teesside; to confer further powers on the mayor, aldermen and burgesses of that borough with regard to the local government, improvement and finances; and for other purposes.
British Railways Act 1971	1971 c. xlv	27 July 1971
An Act to empower the British Railways Board to construct works and to acquire lands; to extend the time for the compulsory purchase of certain lands; to confer further powers on the Board; and for other purposes.
Hertfordshire County Council Act 1971	1971 c. xlvi	27 July 1971
An Act to confer further powers on the Hertfordshire County Council and local and other authorities in the administrative county of Hertford in relation to lands and the local government, improvement and finances of the county; to make further provision for the superannuation of employees and as to the holding of courts of quarter sessions for the county; and for other purposes.
Humber Bridge Act 1971	1971 c. xlvii	27 July 1971
An Act to amend the Humber Bridge Act 1959; (Note: Humber Bridge Act 1959 (7 & 8 Eliz. 2. c. xlvi)) to confer further powers on the Humber Bridge Board; and for other purposes.
Greater London Council (Money) Act 1971	1971 c. xlviii	27 July 1971
An Act to regulate the expenditure on capital account and on lending to other persons by the Greater London Council during the financial period from 1st April 1971 to 30th September 1972; and for other purposes.
D. & J. Fowler, Limited and Associated Company Act 1971	1971 c. xlix	27 July 1971
An Act to make provision for the transfer to the State of South Australia in the Commonwealth of Australia of the registered offices of D. & J. Fowler, Limited and D. & J. Fowler (Australia) Limited; for the cesser of application to those companies of provisions of the Companies Acts, 1948 to 1967; and for other purposes incidental thereto.
Stockport Corporation Act 1971	1971 c. l	27 July 1971
An Act to confer further powers on the mayor, aldermen and burgesses of the county borough of Stockport; to make further provision with regard to the local government and the health, welfare, improvement and finances of the borough; and for other purposes.
Haringey Corporation Act 1971	1971 c. li	27 July 1971
An Act to make further provision for the local government, health and improvement of the London borough of Haringey; and for other purposes.
East Sussex County Council (Newhaven Bridge) Act 1971	1971 c. lii	27 July 1971
An Act to empower the county council of the administrative county of East Sussex to construct a bridge across the river Ouse with approach roads and other works and to purchase lands compulsorily for those and other purposes, to provide for the removal of an existing bridge across the river Ouse; and for other purposes.
Eton Rural District Council Act 1971	1971 c. liii	27 July 1971
An Act to transfer to the Eton Rural District Council certain property and moneys of Memorial Gardens Limited, Stoke Poges Gardens Association Limited, Mobbs Memorial Trust Limited and Farnham Park Recreational Trust; to confer powers upon that council in relation to the Stoke Poges Gardens and other lands at Stoke Poges and at Farnham Royal; and for other purposes.
Cornwall County Council Act 1971	1971 c. liv	27 July 1971
An Act to confer further powers on the Cornwall County Council and on local authorities in the administrative county of Cornwall in relation to lands, development and the local government, improvement and finances of and in the county; and for other purposes.
Bristol Corporation (West Dock) Act 1971	1971 c. lv	27 July 1971
An Act to empower the lord mayor, aldermen and burgesses of the city of Bristol to construct works and to acquire lands; to confer further powers upon the Corporation with reference to their dock undertaking; and for other purposes.
East Suffolk County Council Act 1971	1971 c. lvi	27 July 1971
An Act to confer power on the East Suffolk County Council to lend money to local and other authorities; to confer further powers on local authorities in the county of East Suffolk in relation to the investment of superannuation funds maintained under the Local Government Superannuation Act 1937; (Note: Local Government Superannuation Act 1937 (1 Edw. 8 & 1 Geo. 6. c. 68)) to make further provision for the superannuation of employees; and for other purposes.
Mersey Docks and Harbour Act 1971	1971 c. lvii	27 July 1971
An Act to reconstitute the Mersey Docks and Harbour Board as a company and to alter its name; to reorganise the capital of the Board; and for other purposes.
Trent River Authority (General Powers) Act 1971	1971 c. lviii	27 July 1971
An Act to confer further powers on the Trent River Authority in relation to the acquisition of lands, the construction of works and the administration of the area of the authority; to make further provision for the welfare and superannuation of their staff; and for other purposes.
British Transport Docks Act 1971	1971 c. lix	5 August 1971
An Act to empower the British Transport Docks Board to construct works and to acquire lands; to confer further powers on the Board; and for other purposes.
Torbay Corporation (No. 2) Act 1971	1971 c. lx	5 August 1971
An Act to confer further powers on the mayor, aldermen and burgesses of the county borough of Torbay; to make further provision with regard to the health, local government, improvement and finances of that borough; and for other purposes.
City of London (Various Powers) Act 1971	1971 c. lxi	5 August 1971
An Act to make further provision with respect to public health and the prevention of air pollution in the city of London; the port health jurisdiction of the Corporation of London; the regulation of Epping Forest; Tower Bridge, London; the City of London Markets; and for other purposes.
London Transport (No. 2) Act 1971	1971 c. lxii	5 August 1971
An Act to empower the London Transport Executive to construct works and to acquire lands; to extend the time for the compulsory purchase of certain lands; to confer further powers on the Executive; and for other purposes.
Oxfordshire County Council Act 1971 (repealed)	1971 c. lxiii	5 August 1971
An Act to confer further powers on the Oxfordshire County Council and on local, highway and other authorities in the administrative county of Oxford in relation to lands, amenities, highways and the local government, improvement, health and finances of the county and of the boroughs and districts therein; and for other purposes. (Repealed by Oxfordshire Act 1985 (c. xxxiv))
Bournemouth Corporation Act 1971	1971 c. lxiv	5 August 1971
An Act to confer further powers upon the mayor, aldermen and burgesses of the borough of Bournemouth in relation to lands and the health, local government, improvement and finances of the borough; and for other purposes.
Exeter Corporation Act 1971 (repealed)	1971 c. lxv	5 August 1971
An Act to empower the mayor, aldermen and citizens of the city of Exeter to discontinue and abandon the ferry in the city across the river Exe commonly known as the Quay Ferry; to make further provision with regard to the improvement, health, local government and finances of the city; and for other purposes. (Repealed by Exeter City Council Act 1987 (c. xi))
Flintshire County Council Act 1971	1971 c. lxvi	5 August 1971
An Act to confer further powers on the Flintshire County Council and on the local, highway and other authorities in the administrative county of Flint in relation to land and highways, planning and amenities and the local government, improvement, health, welfare and finances of the county; to enact provisions with respect to the supply of heat; to make provision for the superannuation of employees; to authorise the Rhyl Urban District Council to abandon and remove the Rhyl promenade pier; and for other purposes.
Manchester Corporation (General Powers) Act 1971	1971 c. lxvii	5 August 1971
An Act to authorise the lord mayor, aldermen and citizens of the city of Manchester to make grants towards the cost of insulating dwellings against noise and vibration attributable to aircraft; to enact provisions in relation to health, local government, lands, markets, industry, finance and pensions and to confer further powers upon the said lord mayor, aldermen and citizens; and for other purposes.
Scunthorpe Corporation Act 1971	1971 c. lxviii	5 August 1971
An Act to confer further powers on the mayor, aldermen and burgesses of the borough of Scunthorpe; to make further provision with regard to the health, local government, improvement and finances of that borough; and for other purposes.
Aldridge-Brownhills Urban District Council Act 1971 (repealed)	1971 c. lxix	5 August 1971
An Act to re-enact with amendments and to extend certain local enactments in force in the urban district of Aldridge-Brownhills; to make further provision for the health, local government, improvement and finances of that district; to confer further powers upon the council of that district; and for other purposes. (Repealed by West Midlands County Council Act 1980 (c. xi))
Chichester Harbour Conservancy Act 1971	1971 c. lxx	5 August 1971
An Act to incorporate the Chichester Harbour Conservancy; to transfer to that Conservancy the harbour undertakings of the mayor, aldermen and citizens of the city of Chichester and the urban district council of Havant and Waterloo; to confer powers on that Conservancy; to enact provisions in connection with the matters aforesaid; and for other purposes.
Isle of Wight County Council Act 1971	1971 c. lxxi	5 August 1971
An Act to confer further powers on the Isle of Wight County Council and on the local, highway and other authorities in the administrative county of the Isle of Wight in relation to public order and public safety; lands, planning and industry; highways and streets and the local government, improvement, health and finances of that county; and for other purposes.
Baird Trust Order Confirmation Act 1971 (repealed)	1971 c. lxxii	16 December 1971
An Act to confirm a Provisional Order under the Private Legislation Procedure (Scotland) Act 1936, relating to the Baird Trust. (Repealed by Baird Trust Reorganisation Act 2005 (asp 11))
	Baird Trust Order 1971 Provisional Order to confer powers on the Trustees of The Baird Trust with respect to the acceptance of gifts, legacies and transfers of property; to enable the said Trustees to enter into agreements and arrangements with other bodies; to increase the sum payable to the said Trustees in respect of their services; and for other purposes.	
Glasgow Corporation Order Confirmation Act 1971	1971 c. lxxiii	16 December 1971
An Act to confirm a Provisional Order under the Private Legislation Procedure (Scotland) Act 1936, relating to Glasgow Corporation.
	Glasgow Corporation Order 1971 Provisional Order to make provision with respect to the granting of certificates for the sale of excisable liquor at the City Hall, Candleriggs, Glasgow; to amend the provisions of the Glasgow Streets Sewers and Buildings Consolidation Order 1937 with respect to the provision of wash-houses; to make provision with respect to the acquisition of land by agreement; to make provision for the imprisonment of convicted persons in certain circumstances without the option of a fine; to make further provision as to the powers of the trustees of the Ure Elder Fund for indigent widow ladies; and for other purposes.	

== Sources ==
- Burke, John, ed. (1971). Current Law Statutes Annotated 1971. Sweet & Maxwell.
- Halsbury's Statutes of England. Vol. 41: Continuation Volume 1971 (3rd ed.). London: Butterworths.
- The Journals of the House of Commons (PDF). Vol. 226 (June 1970 – October 1971). pp. 184–622 – via parliament.uk.
- The Journals of the House of Commons (PDF). Vol. 227 (November 1971 – October 1972). pp. 3–95 – via parliament.uk.
- Chronological Table of the Statutes: Covering the Period from 1235 to the End of 1971. London: Her Majesty's Stationery Office. 1972. pp. 1311–1313. ISBN 978-0-11-840096-1 – via Google Books.
- "UK Public General Acts from 1971". legislation.gov.uk. The National Archives.
- "UK Local Acts from 1971". legislation.gov.uk. The National Archives.
- "Chronological Tables of Local Acts: Part 184 (1970-1973)". legislation.gov.uk. The National Archives.

== See also ==
- List of acts of the Parliament of the United Kingdom
