= Merchant Shipping Act 1894 (UK) =

Act of the Parliament of the United Kingdom

Merchant Shipping Act 1894 (Note: Section 747.)
- Act of Parliament
- Parliament of the United Kingdom
- Long title: An Act to consolidate Enactments relating to Merchant Shipping.
- Citation: 57 & 58 Vict. c. 60
- Introduced by: A. J. Mundella MP (Commons); Farrer Herschell, 1st Baron Herschell (Lords)
- Territorial extent: United Kingdom; Jersey; Guernsey; Isle of Man; Dominions; British Colonies

Dates
- Royal assent: 25 August 1894
- Commencement: 1 January 1895 (Note: Section 478.)
Other legislation
Amends	See § Repealed enactments
Repeals/revokes	See § Repealed enactments
Amended by	Merchant Shipping Act 1897; Merchant Shipping (Liability of Shipowners and others) Act 1900; Merchant Shipping Act 1906; Costs in Criminal Cases Act 1908; Merchant Shipping Act 1911; Pilotage Act 1913; Merchant Shipping (Amendment) Act 1920; Supreme Court of Judicature (Consolidation) Act 1925; Sea Fish Industry Act 1938; National Assistance Act 1948; British Nationality Act 1948; Merchant Shipping (Safety Convention) Act 1949; Justices of the Peace Act 1949; Customs and Excise Act 1952; Statute Law Revision Act 1953; Administration of Justice Act 1956; Ghana Independence Act 1957; Federation of Malaya Independence Act 1957; Public Records Act 1958; [Merchant Shipping (Liability of Shipowners and Others) Act 1958]]; Statute Law Revision Act 1963; Singapore Act 1966; Local Government Act 1966; Local Government (Scotland) Act 1966; Criminal Law Act 1967; National Loans Act 1968; Theft Act 1968; Courts Act 1971; Statute Law (Repeals) Act 1976; Statute Law (Repeals) Act 1977; Forgery and Counterfeiting Act 1981; Belize Act 1981; Bankruptcy (Scotland) Act 1985; Statute Law (Repeals) Act 1986; Debtors (Scotland) Act 1987; Age of Legal Capacity (Scotland) Act 1991; Merchant Shipping (Registration, etc.) Act 1993; Statute Law (Repeals) Act 1993; Merchant Shipping Act 1995
Relates to	Customs Law Repeal Act 1825; Customs (Repeal) Act 1833; Customs (Repeal) Act 1845; Customs Consolidation Act 1853; Merchant Shipping Act 1854; Merchant Shipping Repeal Act 1854; Chinese Passengers Act 1855; Supplemental Customs Consolidation Act 1855; Customs Consolidation Act 1876

Status: Partially repealed

History of passage through Parliament

Records of Parliamentary debate relating to the statute from Hansard

Text of statute as originally enacted

Text of the Merchant Shipping Act 1894 (UK) as in force today (including any amendments) within the United Kingdom, from legislation.gov.uk.

The Merchant Shipping Act 1894 (57 & 58 Vict. c. 60) is an act of the Parliament of the United Kingdom that consolidated enactments relating to merchant shipping in the United Kingdom.

== Background ==
In the United Kingdom, acts of Parliament remain in force until expressly repealed. Blackstone's Commentaries on the Laws of England, published in the late 18th-century, raised questions about the system and structure of the common law and the poor drafting and disorder of the existing statute book.

In 1806, the Commission on Public Records passed a resolution requesting the production of a report on the best mode of reducing the volume of the statute book. From 1810 to 1825, The Statutes of the Realm was published, providing for the first time the authoritative collection of acts.

By the early 19th century, British customs law, relating to trade, navigation, the import and export of goods, and the collection of customs revenue, had become increasingly intricate and difficult to navigate due to the large number of acts passed that had accumulated over many years. This complexity posed challenges for both commerce and law enforcement. The preamble of the Merchant Shipping Repeal Act 1854 (17 & 18 Vict. c. 120) acknowledged that the existing system had become an impediment to trade and the "Ends of Justice".

In 1854, the Merchant Shipping Act 1854 (17 & 18 Vict. c. 104) and the Merchant Shipping Repeal Act 1854 (c. 120) were passed to consolidate and amend the law relating to merchant shipping, repealing almost 50 related statutes.

== Passage ==
Leave to bring in the Merchant Shipping Bill was granted to the President of the Board of Trade, A. J. Mundella MP, the Home Secretary, H. H. Asquith MP and Thomas Burt MP on 3 April 1894. The bill had its first reading in the House of Commons on 2 March 1894, presented by the President of the Board of Trade, A. J. Mundella MP. The bill had its second reading in the House of Commons on 11 April 1854 and was committed to a committee of the whole house. That order was discharged and the bill was committed to a Joint Committee of Lords and Commons on 11 April 1894. This was agreed to by the House of Lords on 16 April 1894 and the bill was committed to the Joint Committee on Statute Law Revision Bills and Consolidation Bills, which reported on 20 July 1894, with amendments to give full effect to amendments, to remove obsolete provisions in the Merchant Shipping Act 1854 (17 & 18 Vict. c. 104) and to correct obvious mistakes. The amended bill was re-committed to a committee of the whole house, which met on 25 July 1894 and 30 July 1894. A planned reading meeting on 3 August 1894 was deferred as it was past midnight. The committee met again on 7 August 1894, during which concerns were raised over rushing such a large Bill (748 clauses and 22 schedules across 368 pages) were raised by George Trout Bartley MP.

The committee reported on 8 August 1894, without amendments. The bill had its third reading in the House of Commons on 8 August 1894 and passed, without amendments.

The bill had its first reading in the House of Lords on 13 August 1894. The bill had its second reading in the House of Lords on 16 August 1894, introduced by the Lord Chancellor, Farrer Herschell, 1st Baron Herschell, and was committed to a committee of the whole house, which met and reported on 17 August 1874, without amendments. A Motion by the Lord Chancellor Farrer Herschell, 1st Baron Herschell, not to re-commit the bill to the Standing Committee passed on 17 August 1894 and the bill had its third reading in the House of Lords on 20 August 1854 and passed, without amendments.

The bill was granted royal assent on 25 August 1854.

== Provisions ==
=== Repealed enactments ===
Section 745 of the act repealed 48 enactments, listed in the twenty-second schedule to the act. Section 745 of the act included several safeguards to ensure continuity during the transition, specifically preserving the validity of existing Orders in Council, licenses, certificates, bylaws, rules, appointments, established bodies, banking institutions, document references, shipping registrations under the Merchant Shipping Act 1854 (17 & 18 Vict. c. 120), and penalties under previous legislation. The provision maintained that these would continue to have force and be recognized as if they had been created or established under the new act, while also ensuring that existing penalties under the Merchant Shipping Acts, 1854 to 1892 could still be prosecuted and that the Behring Sea Award Act 1894 (57 & 58 Vict. c. 2) would remain in effect. Section 745 of the act also provided that, for the avoidance of doubt, the Westbury Saving in section 38 of the Interpretation Act 1889 (52 & 53 Vict. c. 63) would still apply to the repeals effected by the act. Section 745 also provided that the tonnage of every ship not measured or remeasured in accordance with the Merchant Shipping Tonnage Act 1889 (c. 43) would be estimated as if any deduction under that act had not been made, with necessary corrections to registry.

Citation	Short title	Title	Extent of repeal
17 Edw. 2. Stat. 2. c. 11 (Note: (Prerog. Reg. Stat. temp, incert. c. 13 in Rev. Edition))	Prerogativa Regis	Prerogative Regis.	The words "wreck of the sea".
4 Geo. 4. c. 80	Lascars Act 1823	An Act to consolidate and amend the several laws now in force with respect to trade within the limits of the charter of the East India Company, and to make further provision with respect to such trade.	Section twenty-seven, from "and for every omission" to "herein is required," and the word "omission" after "non-observance," section thirty-four.
15 & 16 Vict. c. 26	Foreign Deserters Act 1852	The Foreign Deserters Act, 1852.	The whole act.
16 & 17 Vict. c. 84	Passengers Act Amendment Act 1853	An Act to amend the Passengers Act, 1852, so far as relates to the passages of natives of Asia or Africa, and also passages between the United Kingdom and certain parts of the East Indies.	The whole act.
17 & 18 Vict. c. 104	Merchant Shipping Act 1854	The Merchant Shipping Act, 1854.	The whole act.
17 & 18 Vict. c. 120	Merchant Shipping Repeal Act 1854	The Merchant Shipping Repeal Act, 1854.	Section sixteen.
18 & 19 Vict. c. 91	Merchant Shipping Act Amendment Act 1855	The Merchant Shipping Act, 1855.	The whole act.
18 & 19 Vict. c. 119	Passengers Act 1855	The Passengers Act, 1855.	The whole act.
19 & 20 Vict. c. 41	Seamen's Savings Bank Act 1856	The Seaman's Savings Bank Act, 1856.	The whole act.
24 & 25 Vict. c. 10	Admiralty Court Act 1861	The Admiralty Court Act, 1861.	Sections nine, twelve, and twenty-four.
24 & 25 Vict. c. 52	Australian Passengers Act 1861	The Australian Passengers Act, 1861.	The whole act.
25 & 26 Vict. c. 63	Merchant Shipping Act Amendment Act 1862	The Merchant Shipping Act Amendment Act, 1862.	The whole act.
26 & 27 Vict. c. 51	Passengers Act Amendment Act 1863	The Passengers Act Amendment Act, 1863.	The whole act.
30 & 31 Vict. c. 114	Court of Admiralty (Ireland) Act 1867	The Court of Admiralty (Ireland) Act, 1867.	Sections thirty-five and forty-five.
30 & 31 Vict. c. 124	Merchant Shipping Act 1867	The Merchant Shipping Act, 1867.	The whole act., except section one as far as "Act, 1867," and section twelve.
31 & 32 Vict. c. 45	Sea Fisheries Act 1868	The Sea Fisheries Act, 1868.	Sections twenty-two to twenty-four.
31 & 32 Vict. c. 129	Colonial Shipping Act 1868	The Colonial Shipping Act, 1868.	The whole act.
32 & 33 Vict. c. 11	Merchant Shipping (Colonial) Act 1869	The Merchant Shipping (Colonial) Act, 1869.	The whole act.
33 & 34 Vict. c. 95	Passengers Act Amendment Act 1870	The Passengers Act Amendment Act, 1870.	The whole act.
34 & 35 Vict. c. 110	Merchant Shipping Act 1871	The Merchant Shipping Act, 1871.	The whole act.
35 & 36 Vict. c. 73	Merchant Shipping Act 1872	The Merchant Shipping Act, 1872.	The whole act., except sections one, ten, and seventeen.
36 & 37 Vict. c. 85	Merchant Shipping Act 1873	The Merchant Shipping Act, 1873.	The whole act.
37 & 38 Vict. c. 88	Births and Deaths Registration Act 1874	The Births and Deaths Registration Act, 1874.	Section seventeen, except sub-section (5), and except so far as it relates to Her Majesty's ships.
38 & 39 Vict. c. 17	Explosives Act 1875	The Explosives Act, 1875.	Section forty-two.
39 & 40 Vict. c. 27	Local Light Dues Reduction Act 1876	The Local Light Dues Reduction Act, 1875.	The whole act.
39 & 40 Vict. c. 80	Merchant Shipping Act 1876	The Merchant Shipping Act, 1876.	The whole act.
40 & 41 Vict. c. 16	Removal of Wrecks Act 1877	The Removal of Wreck Act, 1877.	The whole act.
42 & 43 Vict. c. 72	Shipping Casualties Investigations Act 1879	The Shipping Casualties Investigation Act, 1879.	The whole act.
43 & 44 Vict. c. 16	Merchant Seamen (Payment of Wages and Rating) Act 1880	The Merchant Shipping (Payment of Wages and Rating) Act, 1880.	The whole act., except the first paragraph of section one and section eleven.
43 & 44 Vict. c. 18	Merchant Shipping Act (1854) Amendment Act 1880	The Merchant Shipping Act (1854) Amendment Act, 1880.	The whole act.
43 & 44 Vict. c. 22	Merchant Shipping (Fees and Expenses) Act 1880	The Merchant Shipping (Fees and Expenses) Act, 1880.	Sections two, five, six, and seven.
43 & 44 Vict. c. 43	Merchant Shipping (Carriage of Grain) Act 1880	The Merchant Shipping (Carriage of Grain) Act, 1880.	The whole act.
45 & 46 Vict. c. 55	Merchant Shipping (Expenses) Act 1882	The Merchant Shipping (Expenses) Act, 1882.	The whole act., except the first paragraph of section one and section eight.
45 & 46 Vict. c. 76	Merchant Shipping (Colonial Inquiries) Act 1882	The Merchant Shipping (Colonial Inquiries) Act, 1882.	The whole act.
46 & 47 Vict. c. 22	Sea Fisheries Act 1883	The Sea Fisheries Act, 1883.	Section eight.
46 & 47 Vict. c. 41	Merchant Shipping (Fishing Boats) Act 1883	The Merchant Shipping (Fishing Boats) Act, 1883.	The whole act.
49 & 50 Vict. c. 38	Riot (Damages) Act 1886	The Riot (Damages) Act, 1886.	In section six, paragraph (a), and the words "plundering, damage," before "injury," and from "and" and "it" to the end of the section.
50 & 51 Vict. c. 4	Merchant Shipping (Fishing Boats) Act 1887	The Merchant Shipping (Fishing Boats) Act, 1887.	The whole act.
50 & 51 Vict. c. 62	Merchant Shipping (Miscellaneous) Act 1887	The Merchant Shipping (Miscellaneous) Act, 1887.	The whole act.
51 & 52 Vict. c. 24	Merchant Shipping (Life Saving Appliances) Act 1888	The Merchant Shipping (Life Saving Appliances) Act, 1888.	The whole act.
52 & 53 Vict. c. 5	Removal of Wrecks Act 1877, Amendment Act 1889	The Removal of Wrecks Amendment Act, 1877, Amendment Act, 1886.	The whole act.
52 & 53 Vict. c. 29	Passengers Acts Amendment Act 1889	The Passenger Acts Amendment Act, 1889.	The whole act.
52 & 53 Vict. c. 43	Merchant Shipping (Tonnage) Act 1889	The Merchant Shipping (Tonnage) Act, 1889.	The whole act.
52 & 53 Vict. c. 46	Merchant Shipping Act 1889	The Merchant Shipping Act, 1889.	The whole act.
52 & 53 Vict. c. 68	Merchant Shipping (Pilotage) Act 1889	The Merchant Shipping (Pilotage) Act, 1889.	The whole act.
52 & 53 Vict. c. 73	Merchant Shipping (Colours) Act 1889	The Merchant Shipping (Colours) Act, 1889.	The whole act.
53 & 54 Vict. c. 9	Merchant Shipping Act 1890	The Merchant Shipping Act, 1890.	The whole act.
55 & 56 Vict. c. 37	Merchant Shipping Act 1892	The Merchant Shipping Act, 1892.	The whole act.

=== Savings ===
Section 746(1) of the act provided that nothing in the act shall affect the Chinese Passengers Act 1855 (18 & 19 Vict. c. 104).

Section 746(2) of the act provided that any local act which repeals or affects any provisions of the acts repealed by the act shall have the same effect on the corresponding provisions of the act as it had on the said provisions repealed by the act.

Section 746(3) of the act provided that nothing in the act shall affect the ration of any seaman who was rated and served as A.B. before 2 August 1880.

== Subsequent developments ==
Section 746(3) of the act was repealed by section 1 of, and the first schedule to, the Statute Law Revision Act 1953 (2 & 3 Eliz. 2. c. 5), which came into force on 18 December 1953.

Sections 165 and 688 of the act were repealed by section 57(2) of, and the second schedule to, the Administration of Justice Act 1956 (4 & 5 Eliz. 2. c. 46), which came into force on 1 October 1957.

Section 125(5) of the act was repealed by section 1 of, and the schedule to, the Statute Law Revision Act 1963, which came into force on 31 July 1963.

Section 368 of the act was repealed by section 1(1) of, and part VII of schedule 1 to, the Statute Law (Repeals) Act 1976, which came into force on 27 May 1976.

Section 746(1) of the act was repealed by section 1(1) of, and part XV of schedule 1 to, the Statute Law (Repeals) Act 1977, which came into force on 16 June 1977.

Section 683(4) of the act was repealed by section 1(1) of, and part XI of schedule 1 to, the Statute Law (Repeals) Act 1986, which came into force on 2 May 1986.

== See also ==
- Merchant Shipping Act
- Statute Law Revision Act
