= Ground game =

Ground game may refer to any of these:

- Ground fighting, hand-to-hand combat that takes place while the combatants are on the ground.
- Ground Game Act 1880, United Kingdom law giving land occupiers the unalienable right to kill rabbits and hares
- Grassroots, political movement driven "from below" by the actual constituents of a community rather than its leaders.
- Canvassing, the main activity of a political ground game
- In American football, an offensive strategy based on running the ball rather than relying on the forward pass
