= Hawkers Act 1810 =

Act of the Parliament of the United Kingdom

- Act of Parliament
- Parliament of the United Kingdom
- Long title: An Act for placing the Duties of Hawkers and Pedlars under the Management of the Commissioners of Hackney Coaches.
- Citation: 50 Geo. 3. c. 41
- Introduced by: Richard Wharton MP (Commons)
- Territorial extent: United Kingdom

Dates
- Royal assent: 2 June 1810
- Commencement: 2 June 1810 (Note: The Acts of Parliament (Commencement) Act 1793.)
- Repealed: 13 August 1888
Other legislation
Amends	Hawkers Act 1697
Repeals/revokes	Hawkers Act 1697
Amended by	Hawkers Act 1812; London Hackney Carriage Act 1831; Stage Carriages Act 1832
Repealed by	Hawkers Act 1888

Status: Repealed

Text of statute as originally enacted

The Hawkers Act 1810 (50 Geo. 3. c. 41) was an act of the Parliament of the United Kingdom that placed duties of hawkers and pedlars under the management of the commissioners of Hackney coaches.

== Passage ==
Leave to bring in the Hawkers and Pedlars Bill to the House of Commons was granted to the chancellor of the exchequer, Spencer Perceval MP, the attorney general, Vicary Gibbs MP, the solicitor general, Sir Thomas Plumer MP, the secretary to the treasury, Richard Wharton MP and the secretary to the treasury, Charles Arbuthnot MP on 30 April 1810. The bill had its first reading in the House of Commons on 8 May 1810, presented by secretary to the treasury, Richard Wharton MP. The bill had its second reading in the House of Commons on 10 May 1810 and was committed to a committee of the whole house, which met on 14 May 1810 and reported on 15 May 1810, with amendments. The amended bill had its third reading in the House of Commons on 17 May 1810 and passed, without amendments.

The bill had its first reading in the House of Lords on 17 May 1810. The bill had its second reading in the House of Lords on 18 May 1810 and was committed to a committee of the whole house, which met and reported on 24 May 1810, without amendments. The bill had its third reading in the House of Lords on 25 May 1810 and passed, without amendments.

The bill was granted royal assent on 2 June 1810.

== Provisions ==
Section 1 of the act repealed the Hawkers Act 1697 (9 & 10 Will. 3. c. 27) and all acts relating to the duties imposed thereof.

Section 31 of the act, however, extended all applicable provisions of the Hawkers Act 1697 (9 & 10 Will. 3. c. 27) to the act.

== Subsequent developments ==
The qualified terms of the repeal and the contradictory terms of the act were criticised by William Rogers, a member of the Board for the Revision of the Statute Law, and led to several acts being repealed by later Statute Law Revision Acts, including:

- Statute Law Revision Act 1871 (34 & 35 Vict. c. 116)

The whole act was repealed by section 8 of the Hawkers Act 1888 (51 & 52 Vict. c. 33), which came into force on 13 August 1888.
