= Local Government Act 1966 =

Act of the Parliament of the United Kingdom

Local Government Act 1966 (Note: Section 44(1).)
- Act of Parliament
- Parliament of the United Kingdom
- Long title: An Act to make further provision, in relation to England and Wales, with respect to the payment of grants to local authorities, rating and valuation, the classification and lighting of highways and the powers of local authorities to place staff and facilities at the disposal of Ministers concerned with highways and to make payments offsetting the effect of the selective employment tax; to repeal or amend certain enactments relating to local licences and registrations; and for purposes connected with the matters aforesaid.
- Citation: 1966 c. 42
- Territorial extent: England and Wales (Note: Section 44(2).)

Dates
- Royal assent: 13 December 1966
- Commencement: 13 December 1966 (parts I, II and IV) (Note: The Acts of Parliament (Commencement) Act 1793.); 1 April 1967 (part III) (Note: Section 34(2).)
Other legislation
Amends	See § Repealed enactments
Repeals/revokes	See § Repealed enactments
Amended by	Local Government (Amendment) Act 1993; Local Government (Wales) Act 1994; Police and Magistrates' Courts Act 1994; Police Act 1996; Greater London Authority Act 1999; Local Democracy, Economic Development and Construction Act 2009; Police Reform and Social Responsibility Act 2011; Policing and Crime Act 2017
Relates to	Local Government (Scotland) Act 1966

Status: Partially repealed

Text of statute as originally enacted

Revised text of statute as amended

Text of the Local Government Act 1966 as in force today (including any amendments) within the United Kingdom, from legislation.gov.uk.

The Local Government Act 1966 (c. 42) is an act of the Parliament of the United Kingdom that made further provision, in relation to England and Wales, for central government grants to local authorities, rating and valuation, and the classification and lighting of highways, and which introduced grants to local authorities for expenditure arising from the presence in their areas of substantial numbers of people from ethnic minorities.

== Provisions ==
=== Repealed enactments ===
Section 43(2) of the act repealed 49 enactments, listed in parts I to III of schedule 6 to the act.

==== Part I: Enactments Repealed from passing of act ====
Part I — Enactments repealed from passing of act
Citation	Short title	Extent of repeal
30 & 31 Vict. c. 130	Agricultural Gangs Act 1867	The whole act.
33 & 34 Vict. c. 57	Gun Licence Act 1870	The whole act.
38 & 39 Vict. c. 55	Public Health Act 1875	In section 172 the words from the beginning to " charge " where it first occurs and the words from " also " to " may ".
43 & 44 Vict. c. 47	Ground Game Act 1880	In section 4, the proviso.
45 & 46 Vict. c. 72	Revenue, Friendly Societies, and National Debt Act 1882	Section 6.
46 & 47 Vict. c. 10	Customs and Inland Revenue Act 1883	Section 6.
51 & 52 Vict. c. 33	Hawkers Act 1888	The whole act.
57 & 58 Vict. c. 60	Merchant Shipping Act 1894	Sections 341 to 352. In section 365(1), paragraph (d) and the words " (e) emigrant runners ".
6 Edw. 7. c. 48	Merchant Shipping Act 1906	Section 23.
7 Edw. 7. c. 53	Public Health Acts Amendment Act 1907	Section 84.
8 Edw. 7. c. 16	Finance Act 1908	In section 6(4) the word " guns " and the proviso.
26 Geo. 5 & 1 Edw. 8. c. 49	Public Health Act 1936	In section 3(3) the words from " sections " to " in ". Sections 249(1), 250, 251(1)(a) and (b) and 252. In section 249(2) the words " every registration authority and of"; in section 255(3) the words from " produce " to "shall"; and in section 256 the words from " or in the place to which " onwards.
1 Edw. 8 & 1 Geo. 6. c. 12	Firearms Act 1937	In section 15(1) the words " a licence to use or carry a gun under the Gun Licence Act 1870 or ".
10 & 11 Geo. 6. c. 48	Agriculture Act 1947	In section 100(4) the words from " but nothing" onwards.
4 & 5 Eliz. 2. c. 9	Rating and Valuation (Miscellaneous Provisions) Act 1955	Section 1(8).
7 & 8 Eliz. 2. c. 55	Dog Licences Act 1959	In section 4 the words from " if the owner " in subsection (1) to the end of the section. Sections 5 and 9(2). In section 11 the words "declaration and certificate of exemption ", " declaration and certificate ", " declaration or certificate of exemption " and " declaration or certificate ". In section 13, paragraph (b), the word " or " immediately preceding that paragraph, the words " or certificate " where they first occur and the words " or certificate " in the next place where they subsequently occur. Section 14.
9 & 10 Eliz. 2. c. 45	Rating and Valuation Act 1961	Section 28(3).

==== Part II: Enactments repealed from 1 April 1967 ====
Part II — Enactments repealed from 1 April 1967
Citation	Short title	Extent of repeal
9 & 10 Geo. 5. c. 50	Ministry of Transport Act 1919	In section 17, paragraph (b) of subsection (1) and subsection (2).
26 Geo. 5 & 1 Edw. 8. c. 49	Public Health Act 1936	In Schedule 1, paragraphs 2(1) and 3; in paragraph 4(1) the words " to whom this paragraph applies and" in both places where they occur; and in paragraph 4(2) the words from the beginning to " Provided that".
7 & 8 Eliz. 2. c. 25	Highways Act 1959	In section 63, in subsection (2), the words from " (in the order" to "declare)". In section 64, in subsection (2) the words " other than work for lighting it". Sections 83 and 84. In section 235, subsection (7). In section 295, in subsection (1) in the definition of " improvement ", the words " (except sections eighty-three and eighty-four) ".
10 & 11 Eliz. 2. c. 38	Town and Country Planning Act 1962	Section 184.

==== Part III: Enactments Repealed from the Day Appointed under s. 38(1) ====
Part III — Enactments Repealed from the Day Appointed under s. 38(1)
Citation	Short title	Extent of repeal
43 Eliz. 1. c. 2	Poor Relief Act 1601	In section 1, the words " of every inhabitant parson vicar and other and " and the words "tithes impropriate or pro-priations of tithes ". Section 9.
17 Geo. 2. c. 37	Land Drainage (Rating) Act 1743	The whole act.
17 Geo. 2. c. 38	Poor Relief Act 1743	Section 4 from " but if" onwards. Section 14.
41 Geo. 3. c. 23	Poor Rate Act 1801	Sections 4 and 5. Section 8 from " and all and every " onwards.
6 & 7 Will. 4. c. 71	Tithe Act 1836	Section 69.
2 & 3 Vict. c. 84	Poor Rate Act 1839	The whole act.
3 & 4 Vict. c. 89	Poor Rate Exemption Act 1840	The whole act.
14 & 15 Vict. c. 50	Tithe Rating Act 1851	The whole act.
23 & 24 Vict. c. 112	Defence Act 1860	Section 33.
28 & 29 Vict. c. 87	Post Office Extension Act 1865	Section 12.
31 & 32 Vict. c. 110	Telegraph Act 1868	Section 22.
31 & 32 Vict. c. 122	Poor Law Amendment Act 1868	The whole act.
32 & 33 Vict. c. 41	Poor Rate Assessment and Collection Act 1869	Sections 7 and 19.
35 & 36 Vict. c. 68	Military Forces Localization Act 1872	Section 11.
37 & 38 Vict. c. 54	Rating Act 1874	In section 7, the words "and tithe rentcharge ".
41 & 42 Vict. c. 26	Parliamentary and Municipal Registration Act 1878	The whole act.
42 & 43 Vict. c. 10	Assessed Rates Act 1879	The whole act.
42 & 43 Vict. c. 54	Poor Law Act 1879	The whole act.
48 & 49 Vict. c. 45	Post Office (Sites) Act 1885	Section 10.
11 & 12 Geo. 5. c. 55	Railways Act 1921	Section 70(1).
12 & 13 Geo. 5. c. 50	Expiring Laws Act 1922	In Schedule 1, the entry numbered (1).
15 & 16 Geo. 5. c. 90	Rating and Valuation Act 1925	In section 2(1), the word " urban ". Section 2(2) and (8). In section 11(7), the words " seven " and " and nineteen ". In section 22(1)(b), the words " and tithe rentcharge, if any ". Section 66. In section 68(1), in the definition of " gross value ", the words " and tithe rentcharge, if any ". Section 68(2).
19 & 20 Geo. 5. c. 17	Local Government Act 1929	Schedule 3.
23 & 24 Geo. 5. c. 51	Local Government Act 1933	In section 193(7), the words " of the Poor Rate Act 1839 or ".
11 & 12 Geo. 6. c. 26	Local Government Act 1948	In section 57(1) the words " or residence ". Sections 70(3) and 71(a) to (c).
4 & 5 Eliz. 2. c. 9	Rating and Valuation (Miscellaneous Provisions) Act 1955	Section 4(1).
9 & 10 Eliz. 2. c. 45	Rating and Valuation Act 1961	In section 18(2)(d) the words " net annual " in the second place where they occur. In Schedule 3, paragraphs 1 to 4, in paragraph 5 the words from " in subsection (2) " to " and (6) ", and paragraph 6.
1963 c. 33	London Government Act 1963	In Schedule 15, paragraph 5(4).

== Subsequent developments ==
The Rating (Pre-Consolidation Amendments) Appointed Day Order 1967 (SI 1967/497) provided that the appointed day under section 38(1) of the act would be 1 April 1967.
