= Dog Licences Act 1959 =

Act of the Parliament of the United Kingdom

Dog Licences Act 1959 (Note: Section 17(1).)
- Act of Parliament
- Parliament of the United Kingdom
- Long title: An Act to consolidate certain enactments and Orders in Council relating to the licensing of dogs kept in Great Britain.
- Citation: 7 & 8 Eliz. 2. c. 55
- Territorial extent: England and Wales; Scotland; (Note: Section 17(2).)

Dates
- Royal assent: 16 July 1959
- Commencement: 16 October 1959 (Note: Section 17(3).)
- Repealed: 24 May 1988
Other legislation
Amends	See § Repealed enactments
Repeals/revokes	See § Repealed enactments
Amended by	Local Government Act 1966; Local Government (Scotland) Act 1966; Statute Law (Repeals) Act 1974
Repealed by	Local Government Act 1988

Status: Repealed

Text of statute as originally enacted

The Dog Licences Act 1959 (7 & 8 Eliz. 2. c. 55) was an act of the Parliament of the United Kingdom that consolidated enactments related to the licensing of dogs in Great Britain.

== Provisions ==
=== Repealed enactments ===
Section 16(1) of the act repealed eight enactments, listed in the schedule to the act.

Citation	Short title	Extent of repeal
30 & 31 Vict. c. 5	Dog Licences Act 1867	The whole act.
41 & 42 Vict. c. 15	Customs and Inland Revenue Act 1878	Section seventeen and sections nineteen to twenty-three.
42 & 43 Vict. c. 21	Customs and Inland Revenue Act 1879	Section twenty-six.
6 Edw. 7. c. 32	Dogs Act 1906	Section five.
8 Edw. 7. c. 16	Finance Act 1908	In section six, in subsection (4), the word "dogs".
17 & 18 Geo. 5. c. 35	Sheriff Courts and Legal Officers (Scotland) Act 1927	Section eighteen.
12 & 13 Geo. 6. c. 47	Finance Act 1949	Section thirteen.
6 & 7 Eliz. 2. c. 56	Finance Act 1958	Section eleven.

== Subsequent developments ==
Section 16(1) of, and the schedule to, the act were repealed by section 1 of, and part XI of the schedule to, the Statute Law (Repeals) Act 1974, which came into force on 27 June 1974.

The whole act was repealed by section 41 of, and part IV of schedule 7 to, the Local Government Act 1988, which came into force on 24 May 1988.
