= Hawkers Act 1888 =

Act of the Parliament of the United Kingdom

Hawkers Act 1888 (Note: Section 1.)
- Act of Parliament
- Parliament of the United Kingdom
- Long title: An Act to consolidate the Law relating to Excise Licences for Hawkers.
- Citation: 51 & 52 Vict. c. 33
- Introduced by: William Jackson MP (Commons)
- Territorial extent: United Kingdom

Dates
- Royal assent: 13 August 1888
- Commencement: 13 August 1888 (Note: The Acts of Parliament (Commencement) Act 1793.)
- Repealed: England and Wales: 13 December 1966; Scotland: 21 December 1966
Other legislation
Amends	See § Repealed enactments
Repeals/revokes	See § Repealed enactments
Amended by	Customs and Excise Act 1952
Repealed by	England and Wales: Local Government Act 1966; Scotland: Local Government (Scotland) Act 1966

Status: Repealed

Text of statute as originally enacted

The Hawkers Act 1888 (51 & 52 Vict. c. 33) was an act of the Parliament of the United Kingdom that consolidated enactments related to hawkers.

== Passage ==
Leave to bring in the Hawkers Bill to the House of Commons was granted to William Jackson MP and Sir Herbert Maxwell MP on 31 July 1888. The bill had its first reading in the House of Commons on 31 July 1888, presented by the William Jackson MP. The bill had its second reading in the House of Commons on 8 August 1888 and was committed to a committee of the whole house, which met and reported on 9 August 1888, without amendments. The bill had its third reading in the House of Commons on 9 August 1888 and passed, without amendments.

The bill had its first reading in the House of Lords on 9 August 1888. The bill had its second reading in the House of Lords on 10 August 1888. A motion not to committed to a committee of the whole house passed and the bill had its third reading in the House of Lords on 10 August 1888 and passed, without amendments.

The bill was granted royal assent on 13 August 1888.

== Provisions ==
=== Repealed enactments ===
Section 8 of the act repealed 13 enactments, listed in the schedule to the act.

Citation	Short title	Title	Extent of repeal
50 Geo. 3. c. 41	Hawkers Act 1810	An Act for placing the duties of hawkers and pedlars under the management of the Commissioners of Hackney Coaches.	The whole act.
52 Geo. 3. c. 108	Hawkers Act 1812	An Act to amend an Act passed in the fiftieth year of His present Majesty for placing the duties of hawkers and pedlars under the management of the Commissioners of Hackney Coaches.	The whole act.
55 Geo. 3. c. 19	Intoxicating Liquors (Ireland) Act 1815	An Act to grant certain duties of Excise upon licences for the sale of spirituous and other liquors by retail, and upon licences to persons dealing in exciseable commodities in Ireland in lieu of the stamp duties payable upon such licences, and to secure the payment of such Excise duties, and to regulate the issuing of such licences, and to discourage the immoderate use of spirituous liquors in Ireland.	Except sections sixty-four, sixty-five, sixty-seven, and sixty-eight.
55 Geo. 3. c. 71	Hawkers (Scotland) Act 1815	An Act to regulate hawkers and pedlars in Scotland.	The whole act.
6 Geo. 4. c. 81	Excise Licences Act 1825	An Act to repeal several duties payable on Excise licences in Great Britain and Ireland, and to impose other duties in lieu thereof, and to amend the laws for granting Excise licences.	Section thirty-five.
22 & 23 Vict. c. 36	Probate Duty Act 1859	An Act to alter the stamp duties payable upon probates of wills and letters of administration, to repeal the stamp duties on licences to exercise the faculty of physic, and to amend the laws relating to hawkers and pedlars.	Sections three and four.
23 & 24 Vict. c. 111	Stamp Duties Act 1860	An Act for granting to Her Majesty certain duties of stamps, and to amend the laws relating to the stamp duties.	Section twenty-one.
24 & 25 Vict. c. 21	Revenue (No. 1) Act 1861	An Act for granting to Her Majesty certain duties of excise and stamps.	Sections seven, and nine.
27 & 28 Vict. c. 18	Revenue (No. 1) Act 1864	An Act to grant certain duties of Customs and Inland Revenue.	Schedule B, so far as it relates to the duties on licences to hawkers and pedlars.
27 & 28 Vict. c. 56	Revenue (No. 2) Act 1864	An Act for granting to Her Majesty certain stamp duties, and to amend the laws relating to the Inland Revenue.	In section six, the words "hawkers and pedlars" and section seven.
28 & 29 Vict. c. 96	Revenue (No. 2) Act 1865	An Act to amend the laws relating to the Inland Revenue.	Section eighteen.
29 & 30 Vict. c. 64	Inland Revenue Act 1866	An Act to amend the laws relating to the Inland Revenue.	Sections eleven and thirteen.
51 & 52 Vict. c. 8	Customs and Inland Revenue Act 1888	The Customs and Inland Revenue Act, 1888.	Subsection one of section ten.

== Subsequent developments ==
The whole act was repealed for England and Wales by section 35(1) and 43(2) of, and part I of schedule 3 and part I of schedule 6 to, the Local Government Act 1966, which came into force on 13 December 1966.

The whole act was repealed for Scotland by section 42(1) and 48(2) of, and part I of schedule 4 and schedule 6 to, the Local Government (Scotland) Act 1966, which came into force on 21 December 1966.
