= Local Government (Scotland) Act 1966 =

Act of the Parliament of the United Kingdom

Local Government (Scotland) Act 1966 (Note: Section 49(1).)
- Act of Parliament
- Parliament of the United Kingdom
- Long title: An Act to make further provision, in relation to Scotland, with respect to the payment of grants to local authorities, valuation and rating, local authority expenditure and functions, and the classification and lighting of highways; to repeal or amend certain enactments relating to local licences and registrations; and for purposes connected with the matters aforesaid.
- Citation: 1966 c. 51
- Territorial extent: Scotland (Note: Section 49(2).)

Dates
- Royal assent: 21 December 1966
- Commencement: 21 December 1966 (various) (Note: The Acts of Parliament (Commencement) Act 1793.); 16 May 1967 (part III and specified repeals) (Note: Sections 34 and 48(2).)
Other legislation
Amends	Local Government (Scotland) Act 1947; Local Government Act 1948; Local Government (Financial Provisions) (Scotland) Act 1963; See § Repealed enactments
Repeals/revokes	See § Repealed enactments
Amended by	Local Government etc. (Scotland) Act 1994; Non-Domestic Rates (Levying) (Scotland) Regulations 1995; Local Government (Application of Enactments) (Scotland) Order 1995; Gas Act 1995; Planning (Consequential Provisions) (Scotland) Act 1997; Local Government and Rating Act 1997; Scotland Act 1998 (Transfer of Functions to the Scottish Ministers etc.) Order 1999; Non-Domestic Rates (Levying) (Scotland) Regulations 2000; National Parks (Scotland) Act 2000; Water Industry (Scotland) Act 2002; Mental Health (Care and Treatment) (Scotland) Act 2003 (Modification of Enactments) Order 2005; Licensing (Scotland) Act 2005 (Consequential Provisions) Order 2009; Wildlife and Natural Environment (Scotland) Act 2011; Local Government Finance (Unoccupied Properties etc.) (Scotland) Act 2012; Non-Domestic Rates (Scotland) Act 2020; First-tier Tribunal for Scotland (Transfer of Functions of Valuation Appeals Committees) Regulations 2023; Non-Domestic Rates (Liability for Unoccupied Properties) (Scotland) Act 2026
Relates to	Local Government Act 1966

Status: Partially repealed

Text of statute as originally enacted

Revised text of statute as amended

Text of the Local Government (Scotland) Act 1966 as in force today (including any amendments) within the United Kingdom, from legislation.gov.uk.

The Local Government (Scotland) Act 1966 (c. 51) is an act of the Parliament of the United Kingdom that made further provision, in relation to Scotland, with respect to the payment of grants to local authorities, valuation and rating, local authority expenditure and functions, and the classification and lighting of highways.

== Provisions ==
=== Repealed enactments ===
Section 48(2) of the act repealed 23 enactments, listed in schedule 6 to the act. The repeals relating to the Game Licences Act 1860 (23 & 24 Vict. c. 90), the Ministry of Transport Act 1919 (9 & 10 Geo. 5. c. 50), the Trunk Roads Act 1936 (1 Edw. 8 & 1 Geo. 6. c. 5), the Town and Country Planning (Scotland) Act 1947 (10 & 11 Geo. 6. c. 53), sections 1, 8 and 10 of the Dog Licences Act 1959 (7 & 8 Eliz. 2. c. 55) and schedule 2 to the Local Government (Financial Provisions) (Scotland) Act 1963 came into force on 16 May 1967.

Citation	Short title	Extent of repeal
23 & 24 Vict. c. 90	Game Licences Act 1860	Section 3.
31 & 32 Vict. c. 110	Telegraph Act 1868	Section 22.
33 & 34 Vict. c. 57	Gun Licence Act 1870	The whole act.
42 & 43 Vict. c. 42	Valuation of Lands (Scotland) Amendment Act 1879	In section 7, the words " and shall then declare himself dissatisfied with such determination ".
43 & 44 Vict. c. 47	Ground Game Act 1880	In section 4, the proviso.
45 & 46 Vict. c. 72	Revenue, Friendly Societies, and National Debt Act 1882	Section 6.
46 & 47 Vict. c. 10	Customs and Inland Revenue Act 1883	Section 6.
51 & 52 Vict. c. 33	Hawkers Act 1888	The whole act.
55 & 56 Vict. c. 55	Burgh Police (Scotland) Act 1892	In section 275, the word " porters ".
57 & 58 Vict. c. 60	Merchant Shipping Act 1894	Sections 341 to 352. In section 365(1), paragraph (d) and the words ' (e) emigrant runners'.
6 Edw. 7. c. 48	Merchant Shipping Act 1906	Section 23.
9 & 10 Geo. 5. c. 50	Ministry of Transport Act 1919	In section 17, paragraph (b) of subsection (1) and subsection (2).
19 & 20 Geo. 5. c. 25	Local Government (Scotland) Act 1929	In Schedule 5, paragraph 3.
1 Edw. 8 & 1 Geo. 6. c. 5	Trunk Roads Act 1936	Section 6(4).
1 Edw. 8 & 1 Geo. 6. c. 12	Firearms Act 1937	In section 15(1) the words " a licence to use or carry a gun under the Gun Licence Act 1870 or ".
10 & 11 Geo. 6. c. 43	Local Government (Scotland) Act 1947	In section 218(1), the words from " with such adjustments " to the word " current" and the words from " For the purposes of this subsection " to the end of the subsection.
10 & 11 Geo. 6. c. 53	Town and Country Planning (Scotland) Act 1947	In section 89, subsections (1) to (3).
11 & 12 Geo. 6. c. 26	Local Government Act 1948	In section 132, subsection (10)(d).
11 & 12 Geo. 6. c. 45	Agriculture (Scotland) Act 1948	In section 53, the words from " but nothing " onwards.
14 Geo. 6. c. 39	Public Utilities Street Works Act 1950	In section 27, in subsection (3), the words from " (in the order " to " declare)".
4 & 5 Eliz. 2. c. 60	Valuation and Rating (Scotland) Act 1956	Section 17. In section 22, subsection (4)(b).
7 & 8 Eliz. 2. c. 55	Dog Licences Act 1959	Section 1(2). In section 4, the words from " if the owner " in subsection (1) to the end of the section. Sections 6, 8 and 9(2). In section 10(1) the words " This subsection shall not apply to Scotland.". Section 10(2). In section 11, the words " declaration and certificate of exemption ", " declaration and certificate ", " declaration or certificate of exemption" and " declaration or certificate ". In section 13, paragraph (b), the word " or " immediately preceding that paragraph, the words " or certificate, as the case may be ", the words " an authorised officer or ", the words " officer or", and the words from "In this section " to the end of the section. Section 14.
1963 c. 12	Local Government (Financial Provisions) (Scotland) Act 1963	Section 7(3). Schedule 2.
