= Ground Game Act 1880 =

Act of the Parliament of the United Kingdom

Ground Game Act 1880 (Note: Section 11.)
- Act of Parliament
- Parliament of the United Kingdom
- Long title: An Act for the better protection of Occupiers of Land against injury to their Crops from Ground Game.
- Citation: 43 & 44 Vict. c. 47
- Territorial extent: United Kingdom

Dates
- Royal assent: 7 September 1880
- Commencement: 7 September 1880 (Note: The Acts of Parliament (Commencement) Act 1793.)
Other legislation
Amended by	Statute Law Revision Act 1894; Ground Game (Amendment) Act 1906; Small Landholders and Agricultural Holdings (Scotland) Act 1931; Prevention of Damage by Rabbits Act 1939; Agriculture (Scotland) Act 1948; Pests Act 1954; Crofters (Scotland) Act 1955; Local Government Act 1966; Local Government (Scotland) Act 1966; Criminal Law Act 1977; Criminal Justice Act 1982; Game Preservation (Amendment) Act (Northern Ireland) 2002; Regulatory Reform (Game) Order 2007; Wildlife and Natural Environment (Scotland) Act 2011

Status: Amended

Text of statute as originally enacted

Revised text of statute as amended

Text of the Ground Game Act 1880 as in force today (including any amendments) within the United Kingdom, from legislation.gov.uk.

The Ground Game Act 1880 (43 & 44 Vict. c. 47) is an act of the Parliament of the United Kingdom passed in 1880 by Gladstone's government, as a result of many complaints over many decades about the intolerable amount of damage that farmers' crops were suffering from damage by wild rabbits and hares and landowners not allowing farmland occupiers to kill them because of game preservation.

The act gives land occupiers the inalienable right to kill rabbits and hares on the land which they occupy, without having to ask their landlords for permission. The act was criticised in the Political Science Quarterly in 1894 for the "red tape" surrounding the act.
