= List of acts of the Parliament of the United Kingdom from 1888 =

This is a complete list of acts of the Parliament of the United Kingdom for the year 1888.

Note that the first parliament of the United Kingdom was held in 1801; parliaments between 1707 and 1800 were either parliaments of Great Britain or of Ireland). For acts passed up until 1707, see the list of acts of the Parliament of England and the list of acts of the Parliament of Scotland. For acts passed from 1707 to 1800, see the list of acts of the Parliament of Great Britain. See also the list of acts of the Parliament of Ireland.

For acts of the devolved parliaments and assemblies in the United Kingdom, see the list of acts of the Scottish Parliament, the list of acts of the Northern Ireland Assembly, and the list of acts and measures of Senedd Cymru; see also the list of acts of the Parliament of Northern Ireland.

The number shown after each act's title is its chapter number. Acts passed before 1963 are cited using this number, preceded by the year(s) of the reign during which the relevant parliamentary session was held; thus the Union with Ireland Act 1800 is cited as "39 & 40 Geo. 3 c. 67", meaning the 67th act passed during the session that started in the 39th year of the reign of George III and which finished in the 40th year of that reign. Note that the modern convention is to use Arabic numerals in citations (thus "41 Geo. 3" rather than "41 Geo. III"). Acts of the last session of the Parliament of Great Britain and the first session of the Parliament of the United Kingdom are both cited as "41 Geo. 3". Acts passed from 1963 onwards are simply cited by calendar year and chapter number.

All modern acts have a short title, e.g. the Local Government Act 2003. Some earlier acts also have a short title given to them by later acts, such as by the Short Titles Act 1896.

== 51 & 52 Vict. ==
The third session of the 24th Parliament of the United Kingdom, which met from 9 February 1888 until 24 December 1888.

=== Public general acts ===
Short title	Citation	Royal assent
Long title
Consolidated Fund (No. 1) Act 1888 (repealed)	51 & 52 Vict. c. 1	27 March 1888
An Act to apply certain sums out of the Consolidated Fund to the service of the years ending on the thirty-first day of March one thousand eight hundred and eight-seven, one thousand eight hundred and eighty-eight, and one thousand eight hundred and eighty-nine. (Repealed by Statute Law Revision Act 1908 (8 Edw. 7. c. 49))
National Debt (Conversion) Act 1888	51 & 52 Vict. c. 2	27 March 1888
An Act for reducing the Rate of Interest on the National Debt.
Statute Law Revision Act 1888 (repealed)	51 & 52 Vict. c. 3	27 March 1888
An Act for further promoting the Revision of the Statute Law by repealing superfluous expressions of enactment, and enactments which have ceased to be in force or have become unnecessary. (Repealed by Statute Law (Repeals) Act 1989 (c. 43))
Army (Annual) Act 1888 (repealed)	51 & 52 Vict. c. 4	27 April 1888
An Act to provide, during twelve months, for the Discipline and Regulation of the Army. (Repealed by Statute Law Revision Act 1908 (8 Edw. 7. c. 49), Statute Law Revision Act 1950 (14 Geo. 6. c. 6) and Revision of the Army and Air Force Acts (Transitional Provisions) Act 1955 (3 & 4 Eliz. 2. c. 20))
Oude and Rohilkund Railway Purchase Act 1888 (repealed)	51 & 52 Vict. c. 5	27 April 1888
An Act to empower the Secretary of State in Council of India to raise money in the United Kingdom for the purchase of the Oude and Rohilkund Railway, and for the construction, extension, and equipment of Railways in India, through the Agency of Companies, and for other purposes relating thereto. (Repealed by East India Loans Act 1937 (1 Edw. 8 & 1 Geo. 6. c. 14))
Metropolitan Board (Commission) Act 1888 (repealed)	51 & 52 Vict. c. 6	30 April 1888
An Act for facilitating the Proceedings of the Commissioners appointed to inquire into the working of the Metropolitan Board of Works. (Repealed by Statute Law Revision Act 1908 (8 Edw. 7. c. 49))
Isle of Man (Customs) Act 1888 (repealed)	51 & 52 Vict. c. 7	16 May 1888
An Act to impose certain Duties of Customs on Spirits imported into the Isle of Man. (Repealed by Isle of Man (Customs) Act 1895 (58 & 59 Vict. c. 38))
Customs and Inland Revenue Act 1888	51 & 52 Vict. c. 8	16 May 1888
An Act to grant certain Duties of Customs and Inland Revenue, to alter other Duties, and to amend the Laws relating to Customs and Inland Revenue. (Repealed for England and Wales and Scotland by Customs (Wine Duty) Act 1888 (51 & 52 Vict. c. 14), Hawkers Act 1888 (51 & 52 Vict. c. 33), Inland Revenue Regulation Act 1890 (53 & 54 Vict. c. 21), Stamp Act 1891 (54 & 55 Vict. c. 39), Statute Law Revision Act 1908 (8 Edw. 7. c. 49), Income Tax Act 1918 (8 & 9 Geo. 5. c. 40), Finance (No. 2) Act 1945 (9 & 10 Geo. 6. c. 13), Finance Act 1949 (12, 13 & 14 Geo. 6. c. 47), Customs and Excise Act 1952 (15 & 16 Geo. 6 & 1 Eliz. 2. c. 44) and Statute Law Revision Act 1953 (2 & 3 Eliz. 2. c. 5))
Roads and Bridges (Scotland) Act 1878 Amendment Act 1888 (repealed)	51 & 52 Vict. c. 9	16 May 1888
An Act to amend the Roads and Bridges (Scotland) Act, 1878. (Note: Roads and Bridges (Scotland) Act 1878 (41 & 42 Vict. c. 51)) (Repealed by Roads (Scotland) Act 1984 (c. 54))
County Electors Act 1888 (repealed)	51 & 52 Vict. c. 10	16 May 1888
An Act to provide for the Qualification and Registration of Electors for the purposes of Local Government in England and Wales. (Repealed by Representation of the People Act 1918 (7 & 8 Geo. 5. c. 64))
Westminster Abbey Act 1888	51 & 52 Vict. c. 11	28 June 1888
An Act to make further provision for the Restoration and Repair of Westminster Abbey.
Electric Lighting Act 1888 (repealed)	51 & 52 Vict. c. 12	28 June 1888
An Act to amend the Electric Lighting Act, 1882. (Note: Electric Lighting Act 1882 (45 & 46 Vict. c. 56)) (Repealed by Electricity Act 1989 (c. 29))
Land Law (Ireland) Act 1888 or the Ashbourne Land Act (repealed)	51 & 52 Vict. c. 13	28 June 1888
An Act to amend Section One of the Land Law (Ireland) Act, 1887, (Note: Land Law (Ireland) Act 1887 (50 & 51 Vict. c. 33)) in regard to Leaseholders. (Repealed by Statute Law Revision Act 1950 (14 Geo. 6. c. 6))
Customs (Wine Duty) Act 1888 (repealed)	51 & 52 Vict. c. 14	28 June 1888
An Act to grant a Duty of Customs on Wine imported in bottle, and to make provision in relation thereto. (Repealed by Customs and Inland Revenue Act 1892 (55 & 56 Vict. c. 16))
National Debt (Supplemental) Act 1888 (repealed)	51 & 52 Vict. c. 15	28 June 1888
An Act to make certain Amendments in the Law consequential on the passing of the National Debt (Conversion) Act, 1888. (Note: National Debt (Conversion) Act 1888 (51 & 52 Vict. c. 2)) (Repealed by Statute Law (Repeals) Act 1986 (c. 12))
Consolidated Fund (No. 2) Act 1888 (repealed)	51 & 52 Vict. c. 16	5 July 1888
An Act to apply the sum of five million five hundred and seventy thousand seven hundred and twelve pounds out of the Consolidated Fund to the service of the year ending on the thirty-first day of March one thousand eight hundred and eighty-nine. (Repealed by Statute Law Revision Act 1908 (8 Edw. 7. c. 49))
Copyright (Musical Compositions) Act 1888 (repealed)	51 & 52 Vict. c. 17	5 July 1888
An Act to amend the Law relating to the Recovery of Penalties for the unauthorised Performance of Copyright Musical Compositions. (Repealed by Copyright Act 1911 (1 & 2 Geo. 5. c. 46))
North Sea Fisheries Act 1888 (repealed)	51 & 52 Vict. c. 18	5 July 1888
An Act to carry into effect an International Convention respecting the Liquor Traffic in the North Sea. (Repealed by North Sea Fisheries Act 1893 (56 & 57 Vict. c. 17))
Inebriates Act 1888 (repealed)	51 & 52 Vict. c. 19	24 July 1888
An Act to amend the Habitual Drunkards Act, 1879. (Note: Habitual Drunkards Act 1879 (42 & 43 Vict. c. 19)) (Repealed for England and Wales and Scotland by Statute Law (Repeals) Act 1976 (c. 16) and for Northern Ireland by Health and Personal Social Services (Northern Ireland) Order 1972 (SI 1972/1265 (N.I. 14)))
Glebe Lands Act 1888 (repealed)	51 & 52 Vict. c. 20	7 August 1888
An Act to facilitate the sale of Glebe Lands. (Repealed by Endowments and Glebe Measure 1976 (No. 4))
Law of Distress Amendment Act 1888 (repealed)	51 & 52 Vict. c. 21	7 August 1888
An Act to amend the Law of Distress for Rent. (Repealed by Tribunals, Courts and Enforcement Act 2007 (c. 15) and Tribunals, Courts and Enforcement Act 2007 (Consequential, Transitional and Saving Provision) Order 2014 (SI 2014/600))
Factory and Workshop Amendment (Scotland) Act 1888 (repealed)	51 & 52 Vict. c. 22	7 August 1888
An Act to amend the Factory and Workshops Act, 1878. (Note: Factory and Workshop Act 1878 (41 & 42 Vict. c. 16)) (Repealed by Factory and Workshop Act 1891 (54 & 55 Vict. c. 75))
Recorders, Magistrates, and Clerks of the Peace Act 1888 (repealed)	51 & 52 Vict. c. 23	10 August 1888
An Act to make better provision as to the appointment of deputies for Recorders, Stipendiary Magistrates, and Clerks of the Peace. (Repealed by Recorders, Stipendiary Magistrates, and Clerks of the Peace Act 1906 (6 Edw. 7. c. 46))
Merchant Shipping (Life Saving Appliances) Act 1888 (repealed)	51 & 52 Vict. c. 24	10 August 1888
An Act to amend the law with respect to the Appliances to be carried by British Merchant Ships for saving Life at Sea. (Repealed by Merchant Shipping Act 1894 (57 & 58 Vict. c. 60))
Railway and Canal Traffic Act 1888	51 & 52 Vict. c. 25	10 August 1888
An Act for the better regulation of Railway and Canal Traffic, and for other purposes.
Consolidated Fund (No. 3) Act 1888 (repealed)	51 & 52 Vict. c. 26	10 August 1888
An Act to apply the sum of twenty million six hundred and ninety-three thousand three hundred and seventy five pounds out of the Consolidated Fund to the service of the year ending on the thirty-first day of March one thousand eight hundred and eighty-nine. (Repealed by Statute Law Revision Act 1908 (8 Edw. 7. c. 49))
Supreme Court of Judicature (Ireland) Amendment Act 1888 (repealed)	51 & 52 Vict. c. 27	10 August 1888
An Act to amend the Supreme Court of Judicature Act (Ireland), 1877. (Note: Supreme Court of Judicature Act (Ireland) 1877 (40 & 41 Vict. c. 57)) (Repealed by Judicature (Northern Ireland) Act 1978 (c. 23))
Marriages Validation Act 1888 (repealed)	51 & 52 Vict. c. 28	13 August 1888
An Act to remove Doubts as to the Validity of certain Marriages solemnised by a Person falsely pretending to be an ordained Clergyman of the Church of England. (Repealed by Statute Law (Repeals) Act 1977 (c. 18))
Lloyd's Signal Stations Act 1888 (repealed)	51 & 52 Vict. c. 29	13 August 1888
An Act to confer Powers on Lloyd's with respect to Signal Stations and Telegraph Communication, and for other purposes. (Repealed by Lloyd's Act 1982 (c. xiv))
Fishery (Ireland) Act 1888 (repealed)	51 & 52 Vict. c. 30	13 August 1888
An Act to amend the Fishery Acts in Ireland. (Repealed by Fisheries Act (Northern Ireland) 1966 (c. 17 (N.I.)))
National Defence Act 1888 (repealed)	51 & 52 Vict. c. 31	13 August 1888
An Act to make better provision respecting National Defence. (Repealed by Statute Law Revision Act 1966 (c. 5))
Imperial Defence Act 1888 (repealed)	51 & 52 Vict. c. 32	13 August 1888
An Act for defraying the Expenses of carrying into effect an Agreement for Naval Defence with the Australasian Colonies, and providing for the Defence of certain Ports and Coaling Stations, and for making further provision for Imperial Defence. (Repealed by Finance Act 1894 (57 & 58 Vict. c. 30), Statute Law Revision Act 1908 (8 Edw. 7. c. 49) and Statute Law Revision Act 1950 (14 Geo. 6. c. 6))
Hawkers Act 1888 (repealed)	51 & 52 Vict. c. 33	13 August 1888
An Act to consolidate the Law relating to Excise Licences for Hawkers. (Repealed for England and Wales by Local Government Act 1966 (c. 42) and for Scotland by Local Government (Scotland) Act 1966 (c. 51))
Municipal Local Bills (Ireland) Act 1888 (repealed)	51 & 52 Vict. c. 34	13 August 1888
An Act to enable Municipal Corporations in Ireland to apply municipal funds in the promotion of Local Bills in Parliament. (Repealed by Local Government Act (Northern Ireland) 1972 (c. 9 (N.I.)))
Special Commission Act 1888 (repealed)	51 & 52 Vict. c. 35	13 August 1888
An Act to constitute a Special Commission to inquire into the charges and allegations made against certain Members of Parliament and other Persons by the Defendants in the recent trial of an action entitled O'Donnell v. Walter and another. (Repealed by Statute Law Revision Act 1908 (8 Edw. 7. c. 49))
Bail (Scotland) Act 1888 (repealed)	51 & 52 Vict. c. 36	13 August 1888
An Act to amend the Law of Bail in Scotland. (Repealed by Criminal Procedure (Scotland) Act 1975 (c. 21))
Timber (Ireland) Act 1888 (repealed)	51 & 52 Vict. c. 37	13 August 1888
An Act to amend the Acts relating to the planting of Timber Trees in Ireland. (Repealed by Forestry Act (Northern Ireland) 1953 (c. 2 (N.I.)))
Expiring Laws Continuance Act 1888 (repealed)	51 & 52 Vict. c. 38	13 August 1888
An Act to continue various expiring Laws. (Repealed by Statute Law Revision Act 1908 (8 Edw. 7. c. 49))
Public Works Loans Act 1888	51 & 52 Vict. c. 39	13 August 1888
An Act to grant money for the purpose of certain Local Loans; and for other purposes relating to Local Loans. (Repealed for England and Wales and Scotland by Statute Law Revision Act 1908 (8 Edw. 7. c. 49) and for the Isle of Man by Isle of Man Act 1958 (6 & 7 Eliz. 2. c. 11))
Metropolitan Board of Works (Money) Act 1888 (repealed)	51 & 52 Vict. c. 40	13 August 1888
An Act to further amend the Acts relating to the raising of Money by the Metropolitan Board of Works, and for other purposes. (Repealed by London County Council (Finance Consolidation) Act 1912 (2 & 3 Geo. 5. c. cv))
Local Government Act 1888	51 & 52 Vict. c. 41	13 August 1888
An Act to amend the Laws relating to Local Government in England and Wales, and for other purposes connected therewith. (Repealed for Northern Ireland by Local Government Act (Northern Ireland) 1972 (c. 9 (N.I.)) and Statute Law (Repeals) Act 2004 (c. 14))
Mortmain and Charitable Uses Act 1888 (repealed)	51 & 52 Vict. c. 42	13 August 1888
An Act to consolidate and amend the Law relating to Mortmain and to the disposition of Land for Charitable Uses. (Repealed by Charities Act 1960 (8 & 9 Eliz. 2. c. 58))
County Courts Act 1888 (repealed)	51 & 52 Vict. c. 43	13 August 1888
An Act to consolidate and amend the County Courts Acts. (Repealed by County Courts Act 1934 (24 & 25 Geo. 5. c. 53))
Local Bankruptcy (Ireland) Act 1888 (repealed)	51 & 52 Vict. c. 44	24 December 1888
An Act to provide for the establishment of Local Courts of Bankruptcy in Ireland. (Repealed by County Courts Act (Northern Ireland) 1955 (c. 21 (N.I.)) and County Courts Act (Northern Ireland) 1959 (c. 25 (N.I.)))
Victoria University Act 1888 (repealed)	51 & 52 Vict. c. 45	24 December 1888
An Act to extend the privileges of the Graduates of the Victoria University. (Repealed by Statute Law (Repeals) Act 1998 (c. 43))
Oaths Act 1888 (repealed)	51 & 52 Vict. c. 46	24 December 1888
An Act to amend the Law as to Oaths. (Repealed by Oaths Act 1978 (c. 19))
Law of Distress and Small Debts (Ireland) Act 1888 (repealed)	51 & 52 Vict. c. 47	24 December 1888
An Act to amend the Law relating to execution for Small Debts and the levying of Distress for Rent in Ireland, with special provisions for the City of Dublin. (Repealed by Judgments Enforcement Act (Northern Ireland) 1969 (c. 30 (N.I.)))
Companies Clauses Consolidation Act 1888	51 & 52 Vict. c. 48	24 December 1888
An Act to amend the Companies Clauses Consolidation Act, 1845, (Note: Companies Clauses Consolidation Act 1845 (8 & 9 Vict. c. 16)) in respect to voting by Proxy.
Purchase of Land (Ireland) Amendment Act 1888 (repealed)	51 & 52 Vict. c. 49	24 December 1888
An Act further to facilitate the Purchase of Land in Ireland by increasing the amount applicable for that purpose by the Land Commission. (Repealed by Statute Law Revision Act 1950 (14 Geo. 6. c. 6))
Patents, Designs, and Trade Marks Act 1888 (repealed)	51 & 52 Vict. c. 50	24 December 1888
An Act to amend the Patents, Designs, and Trade Marks Act, 1883. (Note: Patents, Designs, and Trade Marks Act 1883 (46 & 47 Vict. c. 57)) (Repealed by Patents and Designs Act 1907 (7 Edw. 7. c. 29))
Land Charges Registration and Searches Act 1888 (repealed)	51 & 52 Vict. c. 51	24 December 1888
An Act for registering certain Charges on Land, and for facilitating Searches for them. (Repealed by Land Charges Act 1925 (15 & 16 Geo. 5. c. 22))
Public Health (Buildings in Streets) Act 1888 (repealed)	51 & 52 Vict. c. 52	24 December 1888
An Act to amend the Public Health Acts in relation to Buildings in Streets. (Repealed by Highways Act 1959 (7 & 8 Eliz. 2. c. 25))
Borough Funds (Ireland) Act 1888 (repealed)	51 & 52 Vict. c. 53	24 December 1888
An Act to authorise the application of Funds of Municipal Corporations and other Governing Bodies in Ireland in certain Cases. (Repealed by Local Government Act (Northern Ireland) 1972 (c. 9 (N.I.)))
Sea Fisheries Regulation Act 1888 (repealed)	51 & 52 Vict. c. 54	24 December 1888
An Act for the Regulation of the Sea Fisheries of England and Wales. (Repealed by Sea Fisheries Regulation Act 1966 (c. 38))
Sand-Grouse Protection Act 1888 (repealed)	51 & 52 Vict. c. 55	24 December 1888
An Act for the better Protection of the Sand-Grouse in the United Kingdom. (Repealed by Protection of Birds Act 1954 (2 & 3 Eliz. 2. c. 30))
Suffragans Nomination Act 1888	51 & 52 Vict. c. 56	24 December 1888
An Act to make further provision for the Nomination of Bishops Suffragans.
Statute Law Revision (No. 2) Act 1888 (repealed)	51 & 52 Vict. c. 57	24 December 1888
An Act for further promoting the Revision of the Statute Law by repealing superfluous expressions of enactment, and enactments which have ceased to be in force or have become unnecessary. (Repealed by Statute Law (Repeals) Act 1989 (c. 43))
Employers Liability Act 1880, Continued, 1888 (repealed)	51 & 52 Vict. c. 58	24 December 1888
An Act to continue the Employers Liability Act, 1880. (Note: Employers' Liability Act 1880 (43 & 44 Vict. c. 42)) (Repealed by Statute Law Revision Act 1908 (8 Edw. 7. c. 49))
Trustee Act 1888 (repealed)	51 & 52 Vict. c. 59	24 December 1888
An Act to amend the Law relating to the Duties, Power and Liability of Trustees. (Repealed for England and Wales by Limitation Act 1939 (2 & 3 Geo. 6. c. 21) and for Northern Ireland by Statute of Limitations Act (Northern Ireland) 1958 (c. 10 (N.I.)))
Probate Duties (Scotland and Ireland) Act 1888 (repealed)	51 & 52 Vict. c. 60	24 December 1888
An Act for assigning to Scotland and Ireland respectively certain shares of the Probate Duties; and for providing for the application of such shares. (Repealed for Scotland by Local Government (Scotland) Act 1889 (52 & 53 Vict. c. 50) and for Northern Ireland by Statute Law Revision Act (Northern Ireland) 1954 (c. 35 (N.I.)))
Appropriation Act 1888 (repealed)	51 & 52 Vict. c. 61	24 December 1888
An Act to apply a sum out of the Consolidated Fund to the service of the year ending on the thirty-first day of March one thousand eight hundred and eighty-nine, and to appropriate the Supplies granted in this Session of Parliament. (Repealed by Statute Law Revision Act 1908 (8 Edw. 7. c. 49))
Preferential Payments in Bankruptcy Act 1888 (repealed)	51 & 52 Vict. c. 62	24 December 1888
An Act to amend the Law with respect to Preferential Payments in Bankruptcy, and in the winding-up of Companies. (Repealed by Bankruptcy (Scotland) Act 1913 (3 & 4 Geo. 5. c. 20) and Bankruptcy Act 1914 (4 & 5 Geo. 5. c. 59))
Crofters Commission (Delegation of Powers) Act 1888 (repealed)	51 & 52 Vict. c. 63	24 December 1888
An Act to amend the twenty-third section of "The Crofters Holdings (Scotland) Act, 1886." (Note: Crofters Holdings (Scotland) Act 1886 (49 & 50 Vict. c. 29)) (Repealed by Small Landholders (Scotland) Act 1911 (1 & 2 Geo. 5. c. 49))
Law of Libel Amendment Act 1888	51 & 52 Vict. c. 64	24 December 1888
An Act to amend the Law of Libel.
Solicitors Act 1888 (repealed)	51 & 52 Vict. c. 65	24 December 1888
An Act to provide for the custody of the Roll of Solicitors of the Supreme Court in England by the Incorporated Law Society, and otherwise to amend the law relating to Solicitors. (Repealed by Solicitors Act 1932 (22 & 23 Geo. 5. c. 37))
Friendly Societies Act 1888 (repealed)	51 & 52 Vict. c. 66	24 December 1888
An Act to amend the Friendly Societies Act, 1875, (Note: Friendly Societies Act 1875 (38 & 39 Vict. c. 60)) with reference to certain societies now subject to the provisions of section thirty of that Act. (Repealed by Friendly Societies Act 1889 (52 & 53 Vict. c. 22))

=== Local acts ===
Short title	Citation	Royal assent
Long title
Fylde Waterworks Act 1888	51 & 52 Vict. c. i	27 April 1888
An Act to confer further powers upon the Fylde Waterworks Company.
Lloyd's Act 1888 (repealed)	51 & 52 Vict. c. ii	27 April 1888
An Act to amend Lloyd's Act, 1871. (Note: Lloyd's Act 1871 (34 & 35 Vict. c. xxi)) (Repealed by Lloyd's Act 1911 (1 & 2 Geo. 5. c. lxii))
Columbia Market (Extension of Time) Act 1888 (repealed)	51 & 52 Vict. c. iii	27 April 1888
An Act to extend the time for purchasing Lands and completing the Railways and Works authorised by the Columbia Market Act, 1885. (Note: Columbia Market Act 1885 (48 & 49 Vict. c. lxxiv)) (Repealed by Statute Law (Repeals) Act 2013 (c. 2))
Billinghay and Metheringham (Light) Railway (Abandonment) Act 1888 (repealed)	51 & 52 Vict. c. iv	30 April 1888
An Act for the abandonment of the Billinghay and Metheringham (Light) Railway. (Repealed by Statute Law (Repeals) Act 2013 (c. 2))
South Indian Railway (Additional Powers) Act 1888 (repealed)	51 & 52 Vict. c. v	30 April 1888
An Act for conferring additional powers on the South Indian Railway Company and for other purposes. (Repealed by Statute Law (Repeals) Act 2013 (c. 2))
Kent Waterworks Act 1888	51 & 52 Vict. c. vi	30 April 1888
An Act to confer further powers on the Company of Proprietors of the Kent Waterworks.
Assam Company Act 1888	51 & 52 Vict. c. vii	30 April 1888
An Act for the Reduction of the nominal Capital of the Assam Company and to enable the Company to raise Money by Mortgage.
Isle of Axholme Railway (Abandonment) Act 1888 (repealed)	51 & 52 Vict. c. viii	30 April 1888
An Act for the abandonment of the Isle of Axholme Railway. (Repealed by Statute Law (Repeals) Act 2013 (c. 2))
Lincolnshire Police Superannuation Act 1888 (repealed)	51 & 52 Vict. c. ix	30 April 1888
An Act to make further provisions with respect to the Superannuation Fund for the Police of the three divisions or parts of Lindsey Kesteven and Holland in the county of Lincoln. (Repealed by Statute Law (Repeals) Act 2008 (c. 12))
Uxbridge and Rickmansworth Railway (Abandonment) Act 1888 (repealed)	51 & 52 Vict. c. x	16 May 1888
An Act for the abandonment of the Uxbridge and Rickmansworth Railway. (Repealed by Statute Law (Repeals) Act 2013 (c. 2))
Blackburn Corporation Tramways Act 1888 (repealed)	51 & 52 Vict. c. xi	16 May 1888
An Act to authorise the Construction by the Corporation of Blackburn of new Tramways a new Street and Street Improvements and to extend the Time for Construction of the authorised Tramways and for the Abandonment of a portion of the authorised Tramways and for other purposes connected with the Tramways Undertaking of the Corporation of Blackburn. (Repealed by County of Lancashire Act 1984 (c. xxi))
Newhaven Harbour Act 1888	51 & 52 Vict. c. xii	16 May 1888
An Act to authorise the construction of additional Works and to extend the time for completing certain authorised Works at Newhaven Harbour.
Govan Burgh Amendment Act 1888	51 & 52 Vict. c. xiii	16 May 1888
An Act to amend the Govan Burgh Act, 1878; (Note: Govan Burgh Act 1878 (41 & 42 Vict. c. lxix)) and to enable the Commissioners of Police of the burgh of Govan, in the county of Lanark, to apply certain funds arising under that Act to the maintenance of a public Park now vested in them, and to the erection and maintenance of public Halls and other buildings for the said burgh; and for other purposes.
Clifton Suspension Bridge Act 1888 (repealed)	51 & 52 Vict. c. xiv	16 May 1888
An Act for granting further Powers to the Clifton Suspension Bridge Company and for other purposes. (Repealed by Clifton Suspension Bridge Act 1952 (c.xli))
Draycott Gas Act 1888	51 & 52 Vict. c. xv	16 May 1888
An Act to re-incorporate with further powers the Draycott Gas Company Limited.
Brymbo Water Act 1888	51 & 52 Vict. c. xvi	16 May 1888
An Act to authorize the Brymbo Water Company to construct additional Waterworks in the Counties of Denbigh and Flint; and for other purposes.
London, Brighton and South Coast Railway (Various Powers) Act 1888	51 & 52 Vict. c. xvii	16 May 1888
An Act to confer further powers on the London Brighton and South Coast Railway Company and for other purposes.
Buenos Ayres and Ensenada Port Railway Company's Act 1888	51 & 52 Vict. c. xviii	16 May 1888
An Act to amend the Buenos Ayres and Ensenada Port Railway Company's Act 1884 (Note: Buenos Ayres and Ensenada Port Railway Company's Act 1884 (47 & 48 Vict. c. lxxxix)) and to make further provision with reference to the Company's Capital and for other purposes.
Perth Water and Gas Act 1888	51 & 52 Vict. c. xix	16 May 1888
An Act for making provision for an additional supply of Water to the City of Perth and the Suburbs thereof and for the acquisition of Lands for the storage of Gas in the said City and for other purposes.
Clyde Navigation Act 1888 (repealed)	51 & 52 Vict. c. xx	16 May 1888
An Act to amend the Clyde Navigation Acts, with respect to the Election of Trustees by Shipowners and Ratepayers; and for other purposes. (Repealed by Clyde Port Authority Order Confirmation Act 1965 (c. xlv))
Life Association of Scotland Act 1888 (repealed)	51 & 52 Vict. c. xxi	16 May 1888
An Act for amending the Act incorporating the Life Association of Scotland, and the Contract of Copartnery and Royal Charter of that Association; for enlarging their powers of investment; and for other purposes. (Repealed by Life Association of Scotland Limited Act 1964 (c. vii))
Holsworthy and Bude Railway Act 1888 (repealed)	51 & 52 Vict. c. xxii	28 June 1888
An Act to extend the Powers of the Holsworthy and Bude Railway Company for completion of their authorised railway and for other purposes. (Repealed by Holsworthy and Bude Railway Abandonment Act 1892 (55 & 56 Vict. c. xx))
Glasgow Corporation Act 1888	51 & 52 Vict. c. xxiii	28 June 1888
An Act to confer further powers on the Corporation of Glasgow in relation to their Gas undertaking; their Municipal Buildings; the Barony Church; Cathkin Park; Bazaar and other Markets; and for other purposes.
Barnstaple Waterworks Act 1888	51 & 52 Vict. c. xxiv	28 June 1888
An Act to enable the Barnstaple Water Company to construct additional Works and raise additional Capital; and for other purposes.
Folkestone Waterworks Act 1888	51 & 52 Vict. c. xxv	28 June 1888
An Act for the granting of further powers to the Folkestone Waterworks Company.
Brecon and Merthyr Railway Act 1888	51 & 52 Vict. c. xxvi	28 June 1888
An Act to confer further powers upon the Brecon and Merthyr Tydfil Junction Railway Company.
Keswick Gas Act 1888	51 & 52 Vict. c. xxvii	28 June 1888
An Act to re-incorporate with further powers the Keswick Gaslight and Coke Company Limited.
Folkestone, Sandgate and Hythe Tramways Act 1888	51 & 52 Vict. c. xxviii	28 June 1888
An Act to extend the time for completing the Folkestone Sandgate and Hythe Tramways and for other purposes.
Lanarkshire and Ayrshire Railway (Capital Powers) Act 1888	51 & 52 Vict. c. xxix	28 June 1888
An Act to empower the Lanarkshire and Ayrshire Railway Company to raise moneys by the issue of Debenture Stock and to enable the Caledonian Railway Company to make advances to the Company by way of Loan or otherwise and for other purposes.
Scarborough, Bridlington and West Riding Junction Railways Act 1888	51 & 52 Vict. c. xxx	28 June 1888
An Act to empower the Scarborough Bridlington and West Riding Junction Railways Company to abandon a portion of their authorised Railway No. 1 and to construct a new Railway instead thereof in the East Riding of the County of York; to extend the periods for the compulsory purchase of Lands for and for the completion of the remainder of their authorised Railways; to reduce the Capital of the Company, and for other purposes.
Metropolitan Commons (Farnborough, &c.) Supplemental Act 1888	51 & 52 Vict. c. xxxi	28 June 1888
An Act to confirm a Scheme under the Metropolitan Commons Act, 1866, (Note: Metropolitan Commons Act 1866 (29 & 30 Vict. c. 122)) and the Metropolitan Commons Amendment Act, 1869, (Note: Metropolitan Commons Amendment Act 1869 (32 & 33 Vict. c. 107)) relating to Farnborough Common, Broadstreet Green, Leach's Green and Green Street Green.
	Scheme with respect to Farnborough Common, Broadstreet Green, Leach's Green and Green Street Green.	
Metropolis (Whitechapel and Limehouse) Provisional Order Confirmation Act 1888	51 & 52 Vict. c. xxxii	28 June 1888
An Act to confirm a Provisional Order made by one of Her Majesty's Principal Secretaries of State for modifying the Metropolis (Whitechapel and Limehouse) Improvement Scheme, 1876.
	Whitechapel and Limehouse Order 1888 The Artizans and Labourers Dwellings Improvement Act, 1875. (Note: Artisans' and Labourers' Dwellings Improvement Act 1875 (38 & 39 Vict. c. 36)) Metropolis (Whitechapel and Limehouse) Improvement Scheme Confirmation Act, 1876. (Note: Metropolis (Whitechapel and Limehouse) Improvement Scheme Confirmation Act 1876 (39 & 40 Vict. c. cc)) Provisional Order.	
Local Government Board (Ireland) Provisional Orders Confirmation (Bangor and Warrenpoint) Act 1888	51 & 52 Vict. c. xxxiii	28 June 1888
An Act to confirm certain Provisional Orders of the Local Government Board for Ireland relating to Bangor and Warrenpoint.
	Town of Bangor Provisional Order 1888 Town of Bangor. Provisional Order.	
	Warrenpoint Provisional Order 1888 Town of Warrenpoint. Provisional Order.	
Harrow and Stanmore Railway Act 1888	51 & 52 Vict. c. xxxiv	28 June 1888
An Act to authorise the Harrow and Stanmore Railway Company to deviate a portion of their authorised Railway; and for other purposes.
Chatham and Brompton Tramways (Abandonment) Act 1888	51 & 52 Vict. c. xxxv	28 June 1888
An Act for the abandonment of the Chatham and Brompton Tramways and for authorising the release of the deposit fund remaining deposited as security for the completion thereof.
Victoria Infirmary of Glasgow Act 1888	51 & 52 Vict. c. xxxvi	28 June 1888
An Act to provide for the establishment of an Infirmary in the Parish of Cathcart, to be called the Victoria Infirmary of Glasgow, and for the constitution and incorporation of Governors of that Institution, and the management of its affairs; to authorise the Trustees of the deceased Robert Couper of Millholm in that parish to transfer to the said Governors certain portions of his estate; and for other purposes.
Ayr and District Tramways (Abandonment) Act 1888	51 & 52 Vict. c. xxxvii	28 June 1888
An Act for the abandonment of the Ayr and District Tramways, and for authorising the repayment of the money deposited for securing the completion thereof.
City of London Fire Inquests Act 1888 (repealed)	51 & 52 Vict. c. xxxviii	28 June 1888
An Act to define the Jurisdiction and to regulate the Proceedings of the Coroner of the City of London with regard to Inquests upon Fires within the said City. (Repealed by Criminal Law Act 1977 (c. 45))
Local Government Board's Provisional Orders Confirmation Act 1888	51 & 52 Vict. c. xxxix	28 June 1888
An Act to confirm certain Provisional Orders of the Local Government Board relating to the City of Coventry, the Rural Sanitary Districts of the Cockermouth and Shardlow Unions, and the City of Worcester.
	Cockermouth Union Order 1888 Provisional Order to enable the Sanitary Authority for the Rural Sanitary District of the Cockermouth Union to put in force the Compulsory Clauses of the Lands Clauses Consolidation Acts.	
	Coventry Order 1888 Provisional Order to enable the Urban Sanitary Authority for the City of Coventry to put in force the Compulsory Clauses of the Lands Clauses Consolidation Acts.	
	Shardlow Union Order 1888 Provisional Order to enable the Sanitary Authority for the Rural Sanitary District of the Shardlow Union to put in force the Compulsory Clauses of the Lands Clauses Consolidation Acts.	
	Worcester Order 1888 Provisional Order to enable the Urban Sanitary Authority for the City of Worcester to put in force the Compulsory Clauses of the Lands Clauses Consolidation Acts.	
Local Government Board's Provisional Orders Confirmation (No. 2) Act 1888	51 & 52 Vict. c. xl	28 June 1888
An Act to confirm certain Provisional Orders of the Local Government Board relating to the Local Government District of Alfreton, the Borough of Cardiff, the Local Government Districts of Leadgate and Llanfrechfa Upper, the Port of Lowestoft, the Local Government Districts of Oswaldtwistle and South Gosforth, and the Improvement Act District of Spalding.
	Alfreton Order 1888 Provisional Order for extending the Local Government District of Alfreton, and for other purposes.	
	Cardiff Order 1888 Provisional Order for altering certain Local Acts. (Note: Cardiff Improvement Act 1875 (38 & 39 Vict. c. clxxxvii)) (Note: Cardiff Corporation Act 1884 (47 & 48 Vict. c. ccxxii))	
	Leadgate Order 1888 Provisional Order for extending the Local Government District of Leadgate.	
	Llanfrechfa Upper Order 1888 Provisional Order for altering the Llanfrechfa Upper Local Board Waterworks Act, 1884. (Note: Llanfrechfa Upper Local Board Waterworks Act 1884 (47 & 48 Vict. c. clii))	
	Lowestoft (Port) Order 1888 Provisional Order for altering a Confirming Act. (Note: Local Government Board's Provisional Orders Confirmation (Abergavenny Union, &c.) Act 1879 (42 & 43 Vict. c. ciii))	
	Oswaldtwistle Order 1888 Provisional Order for altering the Oswaldtwistle Local Board Act, 1869. (Note: Oswaldtwistle Local Board Act 1869 (32 & 33 Vict. c. lxvi))	
	South Gosforth Order 1888 Provisional Order for extending the Local Government District of South Gosforth.	
	Spalding Order 1888 Provisional Order for altering the Spalding Improvement Act, 1853. (Note: Spalding Improvement Act 1853 (16 & 17 Vict. c. cxxxix))	
Local Government Board's Provisional Orders Confirmation (Poor Law) Act 1888	51 & 52 Vict. c. xli	28 June 1888
An Act to confirm certain Orders under the provisions of the Divided Parishes and Poor Law Amendment Act, 1876, (Note: Divided Parishes and Poor Law Amendment Act 1876 (39 & 40 Vict. c. 61)) as amended and extended by the Poor Law Act, 1879, (Note: Poor Law Act 1879 (42 & 43 Vict. c. 54)) relating to the Parishes of Asheldam, Black Notley, Bradwell near Coggeshall, Cressing, Dengie, Fairstead, Feering, Goldhanger, Great Coggeshall, Great Totham, Kelvedon, Langford, Little Coggeshall, Little Totham, Mayland, Pattiswicke, Purleigh, Rivenhall, Saint Lawrence, Saint Mary's, Saint Peter's, Southminster, Steeple, Stisted, Stow Maries, Terling, Tollesbury, Tolleshunt D'Arcy, Tolleshunt Knights, Tolleshunt Major, Ulting, White Notley, and Wickham Bishop.
	Black Notley, &c. Order 1888 Braintree Union.	
	Asheldam, &c. Order 1888 Maldon Union.	
Local Government Board's Provisional Orders Confirmation (Poor Law) (No. 2) Act 1888	51 & 52 Vict. c. xlii	28 June 1888
An Act to confirm certain Orders of the Local Government Board under the provisions of the Divided Parishes and Poor Law Amendment Act, 1876, as amended and extended by the Poor Law Act, 1879, relating to the Townships of Foston, Heslerton West, Ideridgehay-and-Alton, Ireton Wood, Kirk Ireton, Scamston, Thornton-le-Clay, Thorp Bassett, and Yeddingham.
	Ideridgehay and Alton, Ireton Wood, and Kirk Ireton Order 1888 Ashbourne and Belper Unions.	
	Foston, &c. Order 1888 Malton Union.	
Local Government Board's Provisional Orders Confirmation (Poor Law) (No. 3) Act 1888	51 & 52 Vict. c. xliii	28 June 1888
An Act to confirm certain Orders of the Local Government Board under the provisions of the Divided Parishes and Poor Law Amendment Act, 1876, as amended and extended by the Poor Law Act, 1879, relating to the Parishes of Barnston, Bowers Gifford, Corringham, Downham, Dunton, Fobbing, Great Bardfield, Great Dunmow, High Easter, High Roothing, Laindon (two), Langdon Hills, Lee Chapel, Little Bardfield, Little Warley, Nevendon, Pitsea, Ramsden Bell House, and Vange.
	Bowers Gifford, &c. Order 1888 Billericay Union.	
	Corringham, &c. Order 1888 Billericay and Orsett Unions.	
	Barnston, &c. Order 1888 Dunmow Union.	
Halifax Corporation Waterworks Act 1888	51 & 52 Vict. c. xliv	28 June 1888
An Act to authorise the Corporation of Halifax to make additional Waterworks and for other purposes.
Southampton Street Tramways (Extensions) Act 1888	51 & 52 Vict. c. xlv	28 June 1888
An Act to authorise the Southampton Tramways Company to construct additional tramways and for other purposes.
Barking Parish Act 1888 (repealed)	51 & 52 Vict. c. xlvi	28 June 1888
An Act for the division of the Parish of Barking into two distinct Parishes for lay and civil purposes. (Repealed by Local Law (North East London Boroughs) Order 1965 (SI 1965/510))
Forth Bridge Railway Act 1888	51 & 52 Vict. c. xlvii	28 June 1888
An Act to enable the Forth Bridge Railway Company to raise additional Capital and for other purposes.
Local Government Board's Provisional Orders Confirmation (Poor Law) (No. 4) Act 1888	51 & 52 Vict. c. xlviii	28 June 1888
An Act to confirm certain Orders of the Local Government Board under the provisions of the Divided Parishes and Poor Law Amendment Act, 1876, as amended and extended by the Poor Law Act, 1879, relating to the Parishes of Aberffraw, Ceidio, Edeyrn, Llandogged, Llangadwaladr, Llanrhychwyn, Nevin, Trefriew, and Tydweiliog; and to the Townships of Llanrwst and Tre Gwydir.
	Aberffraw and Llangadwaladr Order 1888 Bangor and Beaumaris and Holyhead Unions.	
	Llandogged, &c. Order 1888 Llanrwst Union.	
	Ceidio, Edeyrn, Nevin, and Tydweiliog Order 1888 Pwllheli Union.	
Local Government Board's Provisional Orders Confirmation (Poor Law) (No. 5) Act 1888	51 & 52 Vict. c. xlix	28 June 1888
An Act to confirm certain Orders of the Local Government Board under the provisions of the Divided Parishes and Poor Law Amendment Act, 1876, as amended and extended by the Poor Law Act, 1879, relating to the Parishes of Avington, Berstead, Brixton, Brook, Calbourne, Easton, Gatcombe, Itchen Abbas, Itchen Stoke, Kingston, Saint Nicholas, Shalfleet, Shorwell, and Thornham.
	Avington, Easton, Itchen Abbas, and Itchen Stoke Order 1888 Alresford and New Winchester Unions.	
	Berstead and Thornham Order 1888 Hollingbourn and Maidstone Unions.	
	Brixton, &c. Order 1888 Isle of Wight Union.	
Metropolitan Commons (Chislehurst and St. Paul's Cray) Supplemental Act 1888	51 & 52 Vict. c. l	28 June 1888
An Act to confirm a Scheme under the Metropolitan Commons Act, 1866, and the Metropolitan Commons Amendment Act, 1869, relating to Chislehurst and St. Paul's Cray Commons.
	Scheme for amending a Scheme with respect to Chislehurst Common.	
Denny and Dunipace Water Supply Confirmation Act 1888 (repealed)	51 & 52 Vict. c. li	28 June 1888
An Act to confirm a Provisional Order under the Public Health (Scotland) Act, 1867, (Note: Public Health (Scotland) Act 1867 (30 & 31 Vict. c. 101)) relating to Denny and Dunipace Water. (Repealed by Central Regional Council (Denny and Dunipace Water Supply Confirmation Act 1888) Repeal Order 1989 (SI 1989/1498))
	Denny and Dunipace Water Supply Order 1888 Denny and Dunipace Water Supply. Provisional Order.	
James Lewis & Son's, Liverpool Copper Wharf Company (Delivery Warrants) Act 1888 (repealed)	51 & 52 Vict. c. lii	28 June 1888
An Act to enable James Lewis & Son's Liverpool Copper Wharf Company Limited to issue transferable certificates and warrants for the delivery of goods and for other purposes. (Repealed by Liverpool Copper Wharf Company (Delivery Warrants) Act 1920 (10 & 11 Geo. 5. c. lxi))
Plymouth and Dartmoor Railway (South Hams Extension) Act 1888	51 & 52 Vict. c. liii	28 June 1888
An Act for conferring further Powers on the Plymouth and Dartmoor Railway Company for the construction of a new railway to Modbury and otherwise in relation to their Undertaking; and for other purposes.
Porthdinlleyn Railway Act 1888 (repealed)	51 & 52 Vict. c. liv	28 June 1888
An Act to revive and extend the powers of the Porthdinlleyn Railway Company for the acquisition of lands for and the completion of their authorised Railway and for other purposes. (Repealed by Porthdinlleyn Railway (Abandonment) Act 1892 (55 & 56 Vict. c. xcvi))
London, Chatham and Dover Railway Act 1888	51 & 52 Vict. c. lv	28 June 1888
An Act to confer further powers on the London Chatham and Dover Railway Company and for other purposes.
Metropolitan Police Provisional Order Confirmation Act 1888 (repealed)	51 & 52 Vict. c. lvi	28 June 1888
An Act to confirm a Provisional Order made by one of Her Majesty's Principal Secretaries of State under the Metropolitan Police Act, 1886, (Note: Metropolitan Police Act 1886 (49 & 50 Vict. c. 22)) relating to lands in the Parishes of St. Mary, Newington (Surrey), St. Pancras (Middlesex), St. Dunstan, Stepney (Middlesex), St. Mary Abbotts, Kensington (Middlesex), and Elstree (Hertford). (Repealed by Statute Law (Repeals) Act 2008 (c. 12))
	Provisional Order made by the Secretary of State under the Metropolitan Police Act, 1886.	
Thames Tunnel (Blackwall) Act 1888	51 & 52 Vict. c. lvii	28 June 1888
An Act to authorise the purchase of additional land for the tunnel authorised by the Thames Tunnel (Blackwall) Act 1887 (Note: Thames Tunnel (Blackwall) Act 1887 (50 & 51 Vict. c. clxxii)) and for other purposes.
Helston and Porthleven Water Act 1888	51 & 52 Vict. c. lviii	28 June 1888
An Act for supplying the borough of Helston the parish of Sithney and the town of Porthleven and neighbourhood with water.
Riddings District Gas Act 1888	51 & 52 Vict. c. lix	28 June 1888
An Act to incorporate the Riddings District Gas Company to confer powers on them with reference to the acquisition construction and maintenance of works the supply of Gas and for other purposes.
Bexley Heath Railway Act 1888	51 & 52 Vict. c. lx	28 June 1888
An Act to extend the time for the purchase of land for and completion of the Bexley Heath Railway and for other purposes.
Local Government Board's Provisional Orders Confirmation (No. 3) Act 1888	51 & 52 Vict. c. lxi	28 June 1888
An Act to confirm certain Provisional Orders of the Local Government Board relating to the Boroughs of Bideford, Burton-upon-Trent, and Stratford-upon-Avon, and the Improvement Act District of Milford.
	Bideford Order 1888 Provisional Order for repealing a Confirming Act. (Note: Local Government Supplemental Act 1867 (30 & 31 Vict. c. 21))	
	Burton upon Trent Order 1888 Provisional Order for altering certain Local Acts. (Note: Burton-upon-Trent Improvement Act 1878 (41 & 42 Vict. c. lxi)) (Note: Burton-upon-Trent Corporation Act 1880 (43 & 44 Vict. c. cxxxix))	
	Milford Order 1888 Provisional Order for altering the Milford Improvement Act, 1857. (Note: Milford Improvement Act 1857 (20 & 21 Vict. c. lxxiv))	
	Stratford-upon-Avon Order 1888 Provisional Order for altering the Stratford-upon-Avon Borough Act, 1879. (Note: Stratford-upon-Avon Borough Act 1879 (42 & 43 Vict. c. cxix))	
Local Government Board's Provisional Orders Confirmation (No. 4) Act 1888	51 & 52 Vict. c. lxii	28 June 1888
An Act to confirm certain Provisional Orders of the Local Government Board relating to the Boroughs of Birkenhead and Stockton-on-Tees, the Local Government Districts of Cleckheaton, Pickering, Rawmarsh, and Wallasey, and the Wirral Joint Hospital District.
	Birkenhead Order 1888 Provisional Order for altering the Birkenhead Corporation Act, 1881. (Note: Birkenhead Corporation Act 1881 (44 & 45 Vict. c. cliii))	
	Cleckheaton Order 1888 Provisional Order for altering the Cleckheaton Local Board Act, 1870. (Note: Cleckheaton Local Board Act 1870 (33 & 34 Vict. c. lxix))	
	Pickering Order 1888 Provisional Order for altering the area of the Local Government District of Pickering.	
	Rawmarsh Order 1888 Provisional Order for altering the Rawmarsh Local Board Act, 1879. (Note: Rawmarsh Local Board Act 1879 (42 & 43 Vict. c. li))	
	Stockton-on-Tees Order 1888 Provisional Order for altering a Local Act. (Note: Stockton-on-Tees (Quay and Markets) Act 1878 (41 & 42 Vict. c. cxciv))	
	Wallasey Order 1888 Provisional Order for altering a Local Act (Note: Wallasey Improvement Act 1845 (8 & 9 Vict. c. vi)) and a Confirming Act. (Note: Public Health Supplemental Act 1853 (No. 1) (16 & 17 Vict. c. 24))	
	Wirral Joint Hospital Order 1888 Provisional Order for forming a United District under Section 279 of the Public Health Act, 1875. (Note: Public Health Act 1875 (38 & 39 Vict. c. 55))	
Local Government Board's Provisional Orders Confirmation (Poor Law) (No. 6) Act 1888	51 & 52 Vict. c. lxiii	28 June 1888
An Act to confirm certain Orders of the Local Government Board under the provisions of the Divided Parishes and Poor Law Amendment Act, 1876, as amended and extended by the Poor Law Act, 1879, relating to the Parishes of Aldham, Barford-Saint-Michael, Birch, Chappel, Copford, Deddington, East Donyland, Easthorpe, Fingringhoe, Fordham, Freyerning, Great Tey, Great Wigborough, Ingatestone, Inworth, Layer-Breton, Layer-de-la-Hay, Layer-Marney, Little Horksley, Little Tey, Little Wigborough, Marks Tey, Messing, Mount Bures, Peldon, Virley, Wakes Colne, West Bergholt, and Wormingford.
	Barford St. Michael and Deddington Order 1888 Banbury and Woodstock Unions.	
	Fryerning and Ingatestone Order 1888 Chelmsford Union.	
	Aldham, &c. Order 1888 Lexden and Winstree Union.	
Tramways Orders Confirmation (No. 1) Act 1888	51 & 52 Vict. c. lxiv	28 June 1888
An Act to confirm certain Provisional Orders made by the Board of Trade under the Tramways Act, 1870, (Note: Tramways Act 1870 (33 & 34 Vict. c. 78)) relating to Barrow-in-Furness Tramways, Birmingham and Western Districts Tramways, Bradford Corporation Tramways, Leeds Corporation Tramways, Newbury and Lamborne Tramway, Pontypridd and Rhondda Valley Tramways, and Stratford, Ilford, and Romford Tramways.
	Barrow-in-Furness Tramways (Release of Deposit) Order 1888 Order authorising the release of the balance of the deposit fund paid into Court on the application for the Barrow-in-Furness Tramways Order, 1884.	
	Birmingham and Western Districts Tramways (Release of Deposits) Order 1888 Order authorising the abandonment of certain of the Tramways authorised by the Birmingham and Western Districts Tramways Order, 1882, the Birmingham and Western Districts Tramways Order, 1883, and the Birmingham and Western Districts Tramways Order, 1885, respectively, and the release of part of the Deposit funds paid into Court on the applications for the said Orders respectively.	
	Bradford Corporation Tramways Order 1888 Order authorising the Mayor Aldermen and Burgesses of the Borough of Bradford to construct additional Tramways in the said Borough.	
	Leeds Corporation Tramways Order 1888 Order authorising the Mayor Aldermen and Burgesses of the Borough of Leeds to construct Tramways in and near the said Borough.	
	Newbury and Lamborne Tramway (Release of Deposit) Order 1888 Order authorising the release of the Balance of the Deposit Fund paid into Court on the application for the Newbury and Lamborne Tramway Order 1874.	
	Pontypridd and Rhondda Valley Tramways (Release of Deposit) Order 1888 Order amending the Pontypridd and Rhondda Valley Tramways Order 1882 with respect to the opening for public traffic of certain of the tramways thereby authorised and authorising the release of the deposit fund paid into Court on the application for the said Order.	
	Stratford Ilford and Romford Tramways (Abandonment of Tramways and Release of Deposit) Order 1888 Order authorising the abandonment of the Tramways authorised by the Stratford Ilford and Romford Tramways Order 1886 and the release of the Deposit Fund paid into Court on the application for the said Order.	
Eastern and Midlands Railway (Extension) Act 1888	51 & 52 Vict. c. lxv	28 June 1888
An Act to enable the Eastern and Midlands Railway Company to make new Railways in the counties of Lincoln and Rutland and for other purposes.
Eastern and Midlands Railway (Further Powers) Act 1888	51 & 52 Vict. c. lxvi	28 June 1888
An Act to enable the Eastern and Midlands Railway Company to abandon certain authorised railways and works to make a new railway and works and for other purposes.
Milford Docks Act 1888	51 & 52 Vict. c. lxvii	28 June 1888
An Act to extend the time limited for the completion of the Docks and Works of and to confer further powers upon the Milford Docks Company and for other purposes.
London and Blackwall Railway Act 1888	51 & 52 Vict. c. lxviii	28 June 1888
An Act to extend the times respectively limited for the compulsory purchase of Lands for and for the completion of the works authorised by the London and Blackwall Railway Act 1885 (Note: London and Blackwall Railway Act 1885 (48 & 49 Vict. c. cxiv)) and to authorise the raising of additional capital; and for other purposes.
St. Botolph Without Aldgate Tithe Rate Act 1888	51 & 52 Vict. c. lxix	28 June 1888
An Act to amend the London (City) Tithes (St. Botolph Without Aldgate) Act 1881, (Note: London (City) Tithes (St. Botolph Without Aldgate) Act 1881 (44 & 45 Vict. c. cxcvii)) and to confer upon the Churchwardens and Tithe Owner respectively additional powers, rights, and privileges; and for other purposes.
Hamilton Water Act 1888	51 & 52 Vict. c. lxx	28 June 1888
An Act for authorising the Hamilton Waterworks Commissioners to make and maintain additional Waterworks and for other purposes.
Midland Great Western, Dublin and Meath, and Navan and Kingscourt Railways (Purchase) Act 1888 (repealed)	51 & 52 Vict. c. lxxi	28 June 1888
An Act for empowering the Midland Great Western Railway of Ireland Company to acquire the Undertakings of the Dublin and Meath Railway Company and of the Navan and Kingscourt Railway Company; and for other purposes. (Repealed by Statute Law (Repeals) Act 2013 (c. 2))
Local Government Board's Provisional Orders Confirmation (Highways) Act 1888	51 & 52 Vict. c. lxxii	5 July 1888
An Act to confirm certain Provisional Orders of the Local Government Board under the Highways and Locomotives (Amendment) Act, 1878, (Note: Highways and Locomotives (Amendment) Act 1878 (41 & 42 Vict. c. 77)) relating to the Counties of Durham, Hertford, and Westmorland.
	Durham Order 1888 Provisional Order as to certain Disturnpiked Roads.	
	Hertford Order 1888 Provisional Order as to certain Disturnpiked Roads.	
	Westmorland Order 1888 Provisional Order as to a Main Road.	
Local Government Board's Provisional Order Confirmation (Port) Act 1888	51 & 52 Vict. c. lxxiii	5 July 1888
An Act to confirm an Order of the Local Government Board under the provisions of the Public Health Act, 1875, as amended by the Public Health (Ships, &c.) Act, 1885, (Note: Public Health (Ships, &c.) Act 1885 (48 & 49 Vict. c. 35)) relating to the Port of Dartmouth.
	Port of Dartmouth Order 1888 The Dartmouth and Totnes Port Sanitary Authority.	
Hinckley Local Board Water Act 1888	51 & 52 Vict. c. lxxiv	5 July 1888
An Act to authorise the Hinckley Local Board to construct Waterworks for the supply of Water to their district and to parishes near thereto and for other purposes.
Henley-on-Thames Gas Act 1888	51 & 52 Vict. c. lxxv	5 July 1888
An Act for incorporating and conferring powers on the Henley-on-Thames Gas Company.
Stockton and Middlesbrough Waterworks Act 1888 (repealed)	51 & 52 Vict. c. lxxvi	5 July 1888
An Act to amend the Acts relating to the supply of Water by the Stockton and Middlesbrough Water Board and to confer further powers on the said Board and for other purposes. (Repealed by Tees Valley Water (Consolidation) Act 1907 (7 Edw. 7. c. lxxx))
Wrexham, Mold and Connah's Quay Railway Act 1888	51 & 52 Vict. c. lxxvii	5 July 1888
An Act for conferring further powers on the Wrexham Mold and Connah's Quay Railway Company; and for other purposes.
London Street Tramways (Extension) Act 1888	51 & 52 Vict. c. lxxviii	5 July 1888
An Act to authorise the London Street Tramways Company to construct additional Tramways and for other purposes.
Belfast Street Tramways Act 1888	51 & 52 Vict. c. lxxix	5 July 1888
An Act to empower the Belfast Street Tramways Company to construct additional Tramways to raise further Money and for other purposes.
Manchester, Sheffield and Lincolnshire Railway (Additional Powers) Act 1888	51 & 52 Vict. c. lxxx	5 July 1888
An Act to confer further powers on the Manchester Sheffield and Lincolnshire Railway Company in connection with their undertaking and for other purposes.
Leeds White Cloth Hall Act 1888	51 & 52 Vict. c. lxxxi	5 July 1888
An Act to enable the Trustees of the Leeds White Cloth Hall to sell the same and to regulate the application of the purchase moneys; and for other purposes.
Newport (Monmouthshire) Corporation Water Act 1888	51 & 52 Vict. c. lxxxii	5 July 1888
An Act to authorise the Mayor Aldermen and Burgesses of the borough of Newport in the county of Monmouth to purchase the undertaking of the Newport Waterworks Company and for other purposes.
South Eastern Railway (Various Powers) Act 1888	51 & 52 Vict. c. lxxxiii	5 July 1888
An Act for conferring further powers upon the South-eastern Railway Company and for other purposes.
Uckfield Water Act 1888 (repealed)	51 & 52 Vict. c. lxxxiv	5 July 1888
An Act for incorporating the Uckfield Water Company and conferring powers on them for the construction of works the supply of Water and for other purposes. (Repealed by Uckfield Water Order 1948 (SI 1948/1906))
South Lincolnshire Fen Water Act 1888 (repealed)	51 & 52 Vict. c. lxxxv	5 July 1888
An Act for incorporating the South Lincolnshire Fen Water Company and empowering them to construct Works and supply Water and for other purposes. (Repealed by Spalding Water Act 1900 (63 & 64 Vict. c. cvii))
Wirral Railway Act 1888	51 & 52 Vict. c. lxxxvi	5 July 1888
An Act for conferring further powers on the Wirral Railway Company and for other purposes.
Cork, Bandon and South Coast Railway Act 1888	51 & 52 Vict. c. lxxxvii	5 July 1888
An Act to authorize the Cork and Bandon Railway Company to construct a Deviation Railway in substitution for a portion of their existing Railway; to raise further Capital by Debenture Stock; to consolidate their Preference Stocks; and for other purposes.
Local Government Board (Ireland) Provisional Order Confirmation (Dublin Markets) Act 1888	51 & 52 Vict. c. lxxxviii	5 July 1888
An Act to confirm a Provisional Order of the Local Government Board for Ireland relating to the providing of a Market Place for Vegetables and Fish, by the Urban Sanitary Authority of the City of Dublin.
	City of Dublin (New Market) Provisional Order 1888 City of Dublin. Provisional Order.	
Local Government Board (Ireland) Provisional Orders Confirmation (Coleraine, Longford and Tandragee) Act 1888	51 & 52 Vict. c. lxxxix	5 July 1888
An Act to confirm certain Provisional Orders of the Local Government Board for Ireland relating to Coleraine, Longford, and Tandragee.
	Coleraine Town Provisional Order 1888 Town of Coleraine. Provisional Order.	
	Longford Waterworks Provisional Order 1888 Longford Waterworks.	
	Tandragee Town Provisional Order 1888 Tandragee Township. Provisional Order 1888.	
Aberpergwm Estate (Bridges) Act 1888	51 & 52 Vict. c. xc	5 July 1888
An Act to empower the Owner of the Aberpergwm Estate in the county of Glamorgan to construct Bridges across the Neath Canal and for other purposes.
Seafield Dock and Railway (Extension of Time and Further Powers) Act 1888	51 & 52 Vict. c. xci	5 July 1888
An Act to revive and extend the time for the compulsory Purchase of Lands for and completion of the Railways authorised by the Seafield Dock and Railway Act 1883 (Note: Seafield Dock and Railway Act 1883 (46 & 47 Vict. c. cii)) and to alter the provisions of that Act relating to capital to change the name of the Seafield Dock and Railway Company and for other purposes.
Lynmouth and Lynton Lift Act 1888	51 & 52 Vict. c. xcii	5 July 1888
An Act for making Lifts between Lynmouth and Lynton in the county of Devon and for other purposes.
North British Railway (Bridgeton Cross Extension) Act 1888	51 & 52 Vict. c. xciii	5 July 1888
An Act to authorise the North British Railway Company to construct a Railway in the City of Glasgow from the College Station of the Company to Bridgeton Cross; and for other purposes.
Local Government Board's Provisional Order Confirmation (Poor Law) (No. 7) Act 1888 (repealed)	51 & 52 Vict. c. xciv	24 July 1888
An Act to confirm a Provisional Order of the Local Government Board under the provisions of the Poor Law Amendment Act, 1867, (Note: Poor Law Amendment Act 1867 (30 & 31 Vict. c. 106)) as amended by the Poor Law Amendment Act, 1868, (Note: Poor Law Amendment Act 1868 (31 & 32 Vict. c. 122)) and extended by the Poor Law Act, 1879, relating to the Parish of Saint Mary Abbotts, Kensington. (Repealed by Statute Law (Repeals) Act 2013 (c. 2))
	Saint Mary Abbotts (Kensington) Order 1888 Provisional Order for partially repeating and altering certain Local Acts. (Note: Saint Mary Abbotts, Kensington (Poor Relief) Act 1756 (29 Geo. 2. c. 63)) (Note: Kensington (Poor Relief) Act 1777 (17 Geo. 3. c. 64)) (Note: St. Mary Abbotts Kensington Poor Relief Act 1826 (7 Geo. 4. c. cxiii))	
Tramways Orders Confirmation (No. 2) Act 1888	51 & 52 Vict. c. xcv	24 July 1888
An Act to confirm certain Provisional Orders made by the Board of Trade under the Tramways Act, 1870, relating to the Bolton and Suburban Tramways, Hartlepools Tramways, and Liverpool Corporation Tramways.
	Bolton and Suburban Tramways Order 1888 Order authorising the use of Steam or any Mechanical Power on the Tramways authorised by the Bolton and Suburban Tramways Order 1878.	
	Hartlepools Tramways Order 1888 Order amending the Hartlepool Tramways Order 1883 and the Hartlepools Tramways Order 1884 with respect to the construction and opening for public traffic of certain portions of the tramways by the said Orders respectively authorised and authorising the abandonment of other portions of such tramways.	
	Liverpool Corporation Tramways Order 1888 Order authorising the use of steam electrical or any mechanical power on certain portions of the Tramways authorised by the Liverpool Tramways Act 1868 (Note: Liverpool Tramways Act 1868 (31 & 32 Vict. c. clxvii)) and the Liverpool Tramways Act, 1871. (Note: Liverpool Tramways Act 1871 (34 & 35 Vict. c. clvii))	
Drainage and Improvement of Lands Supplemental (Ireland) Act 1888	51 & 52 Vict. c. xcvi	24 July 1888
An Act to confirm two Provisional Orders under the Drainage and Improvement of Lands (Ireland) Act, 1863, (Note: Drainage and Improvement of Lands (Ireland) Act 1863 (26 & 27 Vict. c. 88)) and the Acts amending the same, relating to the Ballycolliton Drainage District, in the County of Tipperary, and the Killard River Drainage District, in the County of Cork.
	Ballycolliton Drainage District Order 1888 In the matter of the Ballycolliton Drainage District, in the county Tipperary.	
	Killard River Drainage District Order 1888 In the matter of the Killard River Drainage District, in the county of Cork.	
Water Orders Confirmation Act 1888	51 & 52 Vict. c. xcvii	24 July 1888
An Act to confirm certain Provisional Orders made by the Board of Trade under the Gas and Water Works Facilities Act, 1870, (Note: Gas and Water Works Facilities Act 1870 (33 & 34 Vict. c. 70)) relating to Herne Bay Water, Kettering Water, Mid Kent Water, and Wotton Estate Water.
	Herne Water Order 1888 Order empowering the Herne Bay Waterworks Company to raise additional Capital.	
	Kettering Waterworks Order 1888 Order empowering the Kettering Waterworks Company, Limited, to construct new and additional Waterworks in the Parish of Kettering, in the County of Northampton.	
	Mid Kent Water Order 1888 Order empowering the Mid Kent Water Company (Limited) to construct and maintain Waterworks and to supply Water in the parishes of Snodland West Malling Halling Birling Ditton Addington Leybourne and Ryarsh all in the county of Kent.	
	Wotton Estate Water Supply Order 1888 Order authorising the construction and maintenance of Waterworks and the supply of Water within the Parishes of Ludgershall Brill Kingswood and Woodham all in the County of Buckingham.	
Lincoln Corporation Act 1888	51 & 52 Vict. c. xcviii	24 July 1888
An Act to empower the Corporation of Lincoln to create and issue Consolidated Stock and for other purposes.
Aberdeen District Tramways Act 1888 (repealed)	51 & 52 Vict. c. xcix	24 July 1888
An Act to authorise the Aberdeen District Tramways Company to construct additional Tramways; to amend the Aberdeen District Tramways Act, 1872, (Note: Aberdeen District Tramways Act 1872 (35 & 36 Vict. c. cxciv)) and the Aberdeen District Tramways Extension Act, 1878; (Note: Aberdeen District Tramways Extension Act 1878 (41 & 42 Vict. c. ccxxxiv)) and for other purposes. (Repealed by Aberdeen Corporation (Water, Gas, Electricity and Transport) Order Confirmation Act 1937 (1 Edw. 8 & 1 Geo. 6. c. cii))
Frodsham Gas and Water Act 1888	51 & 52 Vict. c. c	24 July 1888
An Act for dissolving the Frodsham Gas Company, Limited, and for re-incorporating the Members thereof with others, and conferring powers on them for the supply of Gas and Water to the town of Frodsham and neighbourhood; and for other purposes.
Local Government Board's Provisional Orders Confirmation (No. 6) Act 1888	51 & 52 Vict. c. ci	24 July 1888
An Act to confirm certain Provisional Orders of the Local Government Board relating to the Borough of Brighton and Town of Hove, the Darenth Valley Main Sewerage District, and the Local Government Districts of East Barnet Valley, Friern Barnet, and Herne Bay.
	Brighton and Hove Order 1888 Provisional Order for altering a Local Act. (Note: Brighton Intercepting and Outfall Sewers Act 1870 (33 & 34 Vict. c. c))	
	Darenth Valley Order 1888 Provisional Order for repealing and altering a Confirming Act. (Note: Local Government Board's Provisional Order Confirmation (Darenth Valley) Act 1878 (41 & 42 Vict. c. ccxi))	
	East Barnet Valley Order 1888 Provisional Order for extending the Local Government District of East Barnet Valley.	
	Friern Barnet Order 1888 Provisional Order under Section 304 of the Public Health Act, 1875. (Note: Public Health Act 1875 (38 & 39 Vict. c. 55))	
	Herne Bay Order 1888 Provisional Order for altering a Confirming Act. (Note: Local Government Board's Provisional Orders Confirmation (Eastbourne, &c.) Act 1880 (43 & 44 Vict. c. cxxxii))	
Local Government Board's Provisional Orders Confirmation (No. 9) Act 1888 (repealed)	51 & 52 Vict. c. cii	24 July 1888
An Act to confirm certain Provisional Orders of the Local Government Board relating to the Calverley, North Bierley Shipley and Windhill, and Thornton Joint Hospital Districts. (Repealed by West Yorkshire Act 1980 (c. xiv))
	Calverley Order 1888 Provisional Order for forming a United District under Section 279 of the Public Health Act, 1875.	
	North Bierley Order 1888 Provisional Order for forming a United District under Section 279 of the Public Health Act, 1875.	
	Shipley and Windhill Order 1888 Provisional Order for forming a United District under Section 279 of the Public Health Act, 1875.	
	Thornton Order 1888 Provisional Order for forming a United District under Section 279 of the Public Health Act, 1875.	
Local Government Board's Provisional Order Confirmation (No. 12) Act 1888 (repealed)	51 & 52 Vict. c. ciii	24 July 1888
An Act to confirm a Provisional Order of the Local Government Board relating to the Improvement Act District of Bingley. (Repealed by West Yorkshire Act 1980 (c. xiv))
	Bingley Order 1888 Provisional Order for altering the Bingley Improvements Acts of 1847, (Note: Bingley Improvement Act 1847 (10 & 11 Vict. c. cclviii)) 1867, (Note: Bingley Extension and Improvement Act 1867 (30 & 31 Vict. c. lxxxviii)) and 1881. (Note: Bingley Water and Improvement Act 1881 (44 & 45 Vict. c. lxxxiv))	
West Surrey Water Act 1888	51 & 52 Vict. c. civ	24 July 1888
An Act to enable the West Surrey Water Company to construct additional Works and raise additional Capital and for other purposes.
Rhondda and Swansea Bay Railway Act 1888	51 & 52 Vict. c. cv	24 July 1888
An Act to extend the time limited for the compulsory purchase of lands for and the completion of certain Railways and to revive the powers for the construction of other Railways to confer further powers upon the Rhondda and Swansea Bay Railway Company and for other purposes.
Limpsfield and Oxted Water Act 1888	51 & 52 Vict. c. cvi	24 July 1888
An Act for dissolving the Limpsfield and Oxted Water Company (Limited) for re-incorporating the proprietors therein with others and for conferring powers on the Company so to be incorporated and for other purposes.
Saint Mary's Hospital (Newcastle-upon-Tyne) Act 1888	51 & 52 Vict. c. cvii	24 July 1888
An Act to provide for the Administration and Government of the Hospital of Saint Mary the Virgin and of the Free Grammar and other Foundation Schools in Newcastle-upon-Tyne and for extending the objects of those charities.
Water Orders Confirmation (No. 2) Act 1888	51 & 52 Vict. c. cviii	24 July 1888
An Act to confirm certain Provisional Orders made by the Board of Trade under the Gas and Water Works Facilities Act, 1870, relating to Mansfield Water, Mid-Sussex Water, Wimborne Minster Water, and Worksop Water.
	Mansfield Water Order 1888 Order empowering the Mansfield Water Company to raise additional Capital.	
	Mid-Sussex Water Order 1888 Order empowering the Mid-Sussex Water Company, Limited, to construct and maintain Waterworks, and to supply Water within the Parishes of Balcombe, Ardingley and Wivelsfield, and parts of the Parishes and Districts of Cuckfield, Hayward's Heath and Lindfield, all in the County of Sussex.	
	Wimborne Minster Water Order 1888 Order empowering the Wimborne Minster Waterworks Company Limited to construct and maintain Waterworks and supply Water in the Parish of Wimborne Minster in the County of Dorset.	
	Worksop Waterworks Order 1888 Order empowering the Worksop Waterworks Company to raise additional Capital.	
Lanarkshire and Ayrshire Railway (Additional Powers) Act 1888	51 & 52 Vict. c. cix	24 July 1888
An Act to confer further powers on the Lanarkshire and Ayrshire Railway Company and for other purposes.
Liverpool Overhead Railway Act 1888 (repealed)	51 & 52 Vict. c. cx	24 July 1888
An Act to incorporate a Company for the purpose of taking over and exercising by agreement with the Mersey Docks and Harbour Board the powers conferred on that Board by the Mersey Docks and Harbour Board (Overhead Railways) Acts 1882 (Note: Mersey Docks and Harbour Board (Overhead Railways) Act 1882 (45 & 46 Vict. c. cciv)) and 1887 (Note: Mersey Docks and Harbour Board (Overhead Railways) Act 1887 (50 & 51 Vict. c. cxxxix)) or some of them and for other purposes. (Repealed by Liverpool Overhead Railway Act 1956 (4 & 5 Eliz. 2. c. lxxxii))
Manchester Ship Canal (Additional Lands) Act 1888	51 & 52 Vict. c. cxi	24 July 1888
An Act to enable the Manchester Ship Canal Company to acquire additional Lands; and for other purposes.
Latimer Road and Acton Railway Act 1888 (repealed)	51 & 52 Vict. c. cxii	24 July 1888
An Act to extend the powers of the Latimer Road and Acton Railway Company. (Repealed by Latimer Road and Acton Railway Act 1900 (63 & 64 Vict. c. xcv))
Greenock Harbour Act 1888 (repealed)	51 & 52 Vict. c. cxiii	24 July 1888
An Act to authorise the Trustees of the Port and Harbours of Greenock to make arrangements with reference to the financial affairs of the Trust; and for other purposes. (Repealed by Greenock Port and Harbours Consolidation Act 1913 (3 & 4 Geo. 5. c. xlii))
Bute Docks Act 1888	51 & 52 Vict. c. cxiv	24 July 1888
An Act for conferring upon the Bute Docks Company additional powers in connexion with their docks and works at Cardiff for amending the Bute Docks Acts and for other purposes.
Liverpool and Birkenhead Subway Act 1888	51 & 52 Vict. c. cxv	24 July 1888
An Act to extend and enlarge the powers of the Liverpool and Birkenhead Subway Company.
Falkirk and District Water Act 1888	51 & 52 Vict. c. cxvi	24 July 1888
An Act to incorporate a public Trust for better supplying with Water the Burgh of Falkirk, and districts and places adjacent; and to make and maintain new and additional Waterworks; and for other purposes.
Limerick Harbour Act 1888	51 & 52 Vict. c. cxvii	24 July 1888
An Act to authorise the Repeal of Rates and Duties now levied in the Port of Limerick and to authorise other Harbour Rates to be levied in lieu thereof and to authorise the Limerick Harbour Commissioners to borrow Money on the security of the said Rates and for other purposes.
Midland Railway Act 1888	51 & 52 Vict. c. cxviii	24 July 1888
An Act to confer additional Powers upon the Midland Railway Company for the construction of Works and the acquisition of Lands for raising further Capital for vesting in that Company the powers of the Dore and Chinley Railway Company and for extending the time for the acquisition of Lands for and the construction of the Dore and Chinley Railway and for other purposes.
Pier and Harbour Orders Confirmation (No. 1) Act 1888	51 & 52 Vict. c. cxix	24 July 1888
An Act to confirm certain Provisional Orders made by the Board of Trade under "The General Pier and Harbour Act, 1861," (Note: General Pier and Harbour Act 1861 (24 & 25 Vict. c. 45)) relating to Broadford, Clevedon, Cromer, Curran, Hopeman, Mill Point, Saint Ives, and Southbourne.
	Broadford Harbour Order 1888 Order for the construction and maintenance of a pier and other works, and the regulation of the harbour at Broadford, in the Island of Skye, and county of Inverness.	
	Clevedon Pier Order 1888 Order for the Extension of the Pier and other Works at Clevedon, in the County of Somerset.	
	Cromer Esplanade Pier Order 1888 Order for the construction, maintenance, and regulation of a Promenade Pier and Lift at Cromer, in the county of Norfolk.	
	Curran Pier (Larne Harbour) Order 1888 Order for amending the Curran Pier and Harbour Order, 1871.	
	Hopeman Harbour Order 1888 Order for the Improvement Maintenance and Regulation of the Harbour of Hopeman in the Parish of Dufus and County of Elgin.	
	Mill Point Pier Order 1888 Order for the construction maintenance and regulation of a Pier and Works at Mill Point in the Parish of Grey Abbey in the County of Down.	
	St. Ives Harbour Order 1888 Order amending the St. Ives Harbour Order, 1886.	
	Southbourne Pier Order 1888 Order for amending Southbourne Pier Order, 1885.	
Local Government Board's Provisional Orders Confirmation (No. 5) Act 1888	51 & 52 Vict. c. cxx	24 July 1888
An Act to confirm certain Provisional Orders of the Local Government Board relating to the Boroughs of Devonport, Okehampton, Ramsgate, and Sandwich, the Local Government District of Royton, and the Richmond Main Sewerage District.
	Devonport Order 1888 Provisional Order to enable the Urban Sanitary Authority for the Borough of Devonport to put in force the Compulsory Clauses of the Lands Clauses Consolidation Acts.	
	Okehampton Order 1888 Provisional Order to enable the Urban Sanitary Authority for the Borough of Okehampton to put in force the Compulsory Clauses of the Lands Clauses Consolidation Acts.	
	Ramsgate Order 1888 Provisional Order to enable the Urban Sanitary Authority for the Borough of Ramsgate to put in force the Compulsory Clauses of the Lands Clauses Consolidation Acts.	
	Richmond Order 1888 Provisional Order to enable the Richmond Main Sewerage Board to put in force the Compulsory Clauses of the Lands Clauses Consolidation Acts.	
	Royton Order 1888 Provisional Order to enable the Sanitary Authority for the Urban Sanitary District of Royton to put in force the Compulsory Clauses of the Lands Clauses Consolidation Acts.	
	Sandwich Order 1888 Provisional Order to enable the Urban Sanitary Authority for the Borough of Sandwich to put in force the Compulsory Clauses of the Lands Clauses Consolidation Acts.	
Local Government Board's Provisional Orders Confirmation (No. 7) Act 1888	51 & 52 Vict. c. cxxi	24 July 1888
An Act to confirm certain Provisional Orders of the Local Government Board relating to the Boroughs of Blackpool and Wigan, the Rural Sanitary District of the Chesterfield Union, and the Local Government District of Tredegar.
	Blackpool Order 1888 Provisional Order for altering certain Local Acts. (Note: Blackpool Improvement Act 1853 (16 & 17 Vict. c. xxix)) (Note: Blackpool Improvement Act 1865 (28 & 29 Vict. c. ccxiv)) (Note: Blackpool Improvement Act 1879 (42 & 43 Vict. c. cxcix))	
	Chesterfield Union Order 1888 Provisional Order for altering certain Local Acts. (Note: Staveley Waterworks (Transfer, &c.) Act 1883 (46 & 47 Vict. c. lviii)) (Note: Staveley Waterworks Act 1871 (34 & 35 Vict. c. cxxvii))	
	Tredegar Order 1888 Provisional Order for altering the Tredegar Water and Gas Act, 1882. (Note: Tredegar Water and Gas Act 1882 (45 & 46 Vict. c. clxxx))	
	Wigan Order 1888 Provisional Order for altering certain Local Acts (Note: Wigan Improvement Act 1874 (37 & 38 Vict. c. cxxiv)) (Note: Wigan Improvement Act 1880 (43 & 44 Vict. c. cxxvii)) and a Confirming Act. (Note: Local Government Board's Provisional Orders Confirmation (No. 5) Act 1885 (48 & 49 Vict. c. lxii))	
Tramways Orders Confirmation (No. 3) Act 1888	51 & 52 Vict. c. cxxii	24 July 1888
An Act to confirm certain Provisional Orders made by the Board of Trade under the Tramways Act, 1870, relating to Keighley Tramways, North Metropolitan Tramways, and South Birmingham Tramways.
	Keighley Tramways Order 1888 Order authorising the construction of Tramways in the parish of Keighley in the West Riding of the county of York.	
	North Metropolitan Tramways Order 1888 Order authorising the construction of Tramways in the parishes of St. Mary Whitechapel, and St. John at Wapping, both in the County of Middlesex.	
	South Birmingham Tramways (Abandonment and Release of Deposit) Order 1888 Order authorising the Abandonment of certain of the Tramways authorised by the South Birmingham Tramways Order, 1883, the South Birmingham Tramways Order, 1884, and the South Birmingham Tramways (Extension) Order, 1886, respectively, and the release of portions of the Deposit Funds paid into Court on the applications for the said Orders respectively; and for other purposes.	
Education Department Provisional Order Confirmation (Birmingham) Act 1888	51 & 52 Vict. c. cxxiii	24 July 1888
An Act to confirm a Provisional Order made by the Education Department under the Elementary Education Act, 1870, (Note: Elementary Education Act 1870 (33 & 34 Vict. c. 75)) to enable the School Board for Birmingham to put in force the Lands Clauses Consolidation Act, 1845, (Note: Lands Clauses Consolidation Act 1845 (8 & 9 Vict. c. 18)) and the Acts amending the same.
	Birmingham Order 1888 The School Board for Birmingham, County of Warwick. Provisional Order for putting in force the Lands Clauses Consolidation Act, 1845.	
Local Government Board (Ireland) Provisional Orders Confirmation (Ballymoney, Clones and Tuam) Act 1888	51 & 52 Vict. c. cxxiv	24 July 1888
An Act to confirm certain Provisional Orders of the Local Government Board for Ireland relating to Ballymoney, Clones, and Tuam.
	Ballymoney Town Provisional Order 1888 Town of Ballymoney. Provisional Order.	
	Clones Town Provisional Order 1888 Town of Clones. Provisional Order.	
	Tuam Waterworks Provisional Order 1888 Tuam Waterworks. Provisional Order.	
Gas Orders Confirmation Act 1888	51 & 52 Vict. c. cxxv	24 July 1888
An Act to confirm certain Provisional Orders made by the Board of Trade under the Gas and Water Works Facilities Act, 1870, relating to Chigwell, Loughton, and Woodford Gas, Great Berkhampstead Gas, Hatfield Gas, Snodland Gas, and Swansea Gas.
	Chigwell, Loughton, and Woodford Gas Order 1888 Order empowering the Chigwell, Loughton, and Woodford Gas Company to extend their limits of supply, and to raise additional Capital.	
	Great Berkhampstead Gas Order 1888 Order empowering the Great Berkhampstead Gas Light and Coke Company (Limited) to maintain and continue Gasworks, and to make and supply Gas within the Parishes of Berkhampstead Saint Peter and Berkhampstead Saint Mary, otherwise Northchurch, both in the County of Hertford.	
	Hatfield Gas Order 1888 Order empowering the Hatfield Gas Company (Limited) to maintain and continue Gasworks, and to make and supply Gas in the Town of Hatfield and the Parishes of Bishop's Hatfield and Essendon, and part of the Parish of Saint Peter, in the County of Hertford.	
	Snodland Gas Order 1888 Order empowering C. Townsend Hook and Company (Limited) to maintain and continue Gasworks, and to manufacture and supply Gas within the Parishes of Snodland, Birling, and Halling, all in the County of Kent.	
	Swansea Gas Order 1888 Order empowering the Swansea Gas Light Company to raise additional Capital, and for other purposes.	
Gas Orders Confirmation (No. 2) Act 1888	51 & 52 Vict. c. cxxvi	24 July 1888
An Act to confirm certain Provisional Orders made by the Board of Trade under the Gas and Water Works Facilities Act, 1870, relating to Dursley Gas, King's Lynn Gas, Littlehampton Gas, Oakham Gas, Poulton-le-Fylde Gas, and Worksop Gas.
	Dursley Gas Order 1888 Order empowering the Dursley Gaslight and Coke Company (Limited) to maintain and continue gasworks and to make and supply gas in the town and parish of Dursley, and the parish of Cam, both in the county of Gloucester.	
	King's Lynn Gas Order 1888 Order empowering the King's Lynn Gas Company to raise additional capital and to construct additional works.	
	Littlehampton Gas Order 1888 Order empowering the Littlehampton Gas Company (Limited) to purchase additional lands to construct and maintain additional works and to raise additional capital.	
	Oakham Gas Order 1888 Order empowering the Oakham Gas Company (Limited) to maintain and continue gasworks and to make and supply gas in the parishes of Oakham Dean's Hold with Barleythorpe Oakham Lord's Hold and Langham all in the county of Rutland.	
	Poulton-le-Fylde Gas Order 1888 Order empowering the Poulton-le-Fylde Gas, Coal, Lime, and Coke Company (Limited) to maintain and continue gasworks, and to manufacture and supply gas, within the township of Poulton-le-Fylde and a portion of Thornton and Carleton, all in the parish of Poulton-le-Fylde, in the county of Lancaster.	
	Worksop Gas Order 1888 Order empowering the Worksop Gas Company to raise additional capital.	
Gas and Water Orders Confirmation Act 1888	51 & 52 Vict. c. cxxvii	24 July 1888
An Act to confirm certain Provisional Orders made by the Board of Trade under the Gas and Water Works Facilities Act, 1870, relating to Goring and Streatley District Gas and Water, Sheringham Gas and Water, and Winchester Water and Gas.
	Goring and Streatley District Gas and Water Order 1888 Order empowering the Goring and Streatley District Gas and Water Company, Limited, to construct and maintain Gasworks and Waterworks, and to make and supply gas and to supply water within the parishes of Goring, in the County of Oxford, and Streatley, in the County of Berks.	
	Sheringham Gas and Water Order 1888 Order empowering the Sheringham Gas and Water Company Limited to construct and maintain Gasworks and Waterworks and to make and supply gas and to supply water within the parishes of Sheringham and Beeston Regis in the County of Norfolk.	
	Winchester Water and Gas Order 1888 Order empowering the Winchester Water and Gas Company to raise additional Capital.	
Enniskillen, Bundoran and Sligo Railway (Donegal Extension) Act 1888	51 & 52 Vict. c. cxxviii	24 July 1888
An Act to authorise the repayment of the moneys deposited in respect of the railways authorised to be constructed by the Enniskillen, Bundoran and Sligo Railway (Donegal Extension), and Enniskillen and Bundoran Extension Railway (Abandonment) Act, 1879, (Note: Enniskillen, Bundoran, and Sligo Railway (Donegal Extension) and Enniskillen and Bundoran Extension Railway (Abandonment) Act 1879 (42 & 43 Vict. c. ccxxiv)) and for other purposes.
Edinburgh and Leith Corporation Gas Act 1888 (repealed)	51 & 52 Vict. c. cxxix	24 July 1888
An Act to incorporate and authorise Commissioners to supply with Gas the city of Edinburgh, burgh of Leith, and districts and places adjacent; and to transfer to them the gasworks and gas undertakings of the Edinburgh Gas Light Company, and the Edinburgh and Leith Gas Light Company; and for other purposes. (Repealed by Edinburgh Corporation Order Confirmation Act 1934 (24 & 25 Geo. 5. c. xxx))
East and West Yorkshire Union Railways Act 1888	51 & 52 Vict. c. cxxx	24 July 1888
An Act to extend the time for the compulsory purchase of Lands for and for the completion of the Railways of the East and West Yorkshire Union Railways Company and for other purposes.
Local Government Board's Provisional Orders Confirmation (No. 11) Act 1888	51 & 52 Vict. c. cxxxi	24 July 1888
An Act to confirm certain Provisional Orders of the Local Government Board relating to the Boroughs of Bolton, Heywood, and Kingston-upon-Hull, and the Local Government District of Leigh.
	Bolton Order 1888 Provisional Order for altering certain Local Acts. (Note: Bolton Improvement Act 1854 (17 & 18 Vict. c. clix)) (Note: Bolton Improvement Act 1861 (24 & 25 Vict. c. clxxiii)) (Note: Bolton Improvement Act 1864 (27 & 28 Vict. c. cci)) (Note: Bolton Improvement Act 1865 (28 & 29 Vict. c. xii)) (Note: Bolton Corporation Act 1872 (35 & 36 Vict. c. lxxviii)) (Note: Bolton Improvement Act 1877 (40 & 41 Vict. c. clxxxviii)) (Note: Bolton Improvement Act 1882 (45 & 46 Vict. c. ccxliv))	
	Heywood Order 1888 Provisional Order for altering certain Local Acts. (Note: Heywood Improvement Act 1867 (30 & 31 Vict. c. lxiv)) (Note: Heywood Corporation Act 1883 (46 & 47 Vict. c. lxxi))	
	Kingston-upon-Hull Order 1888 Provisional Order for altering the Hull Corporation Loans Act, 1881. (Note: Hull Corporation Loans Act 1881 (44 & 45 Vict. c. xciv))	
	Leigh Order 1888 Provisional Order for altering a Local Act. (Note: Westleigh, Pennington and Bedford Local Boards (Gas) Act 1874 (37 & 38 Vict. c. lxxi))	
Local Government Board's Provisional Orders Confirmation (Gas) Act 1888	51 & 52 Vict. c. cxxxii	24 July 1888
An Act to confirm certain Provisional Orders of the Local Government Board under the provisions of the Gas and Water Works Facilities Act, 1870, and the Public Health Act, 1875, relating to the Local Government District of Croston and the Borough of Wilton.
	Croston Gas Order 1888 Provisional Order under the Gas and Water Works Facilities Act, 1870.	
	Wilton Gas Order 1888 Provisional Order under the Gas and Water Works Facilities Act, 1870.	
Local Government Board's Provisional Orders Confirmation (No. 8) Act 1888	51 & 52 Vict. c. cxxxiii	24 July 1888
An Act to confirm certain Provisional Orders of the Local Government Board relating to the Boroughs of Aberystwyth and Leeds, the Hartlepool Joint Hospital District, the Improvement Act District of Lytham, and the Local Government Districts of Normanby, Openshaw, and Oswaldtwistle.
	Aberystwyth Order 1888 Provisional Order for altering the Aberystwyth Improvement and Water Act, 1872. (Note: Aberystwyth Improvement and Water Act 1872 (35 & 36 Vict. c. xxx))	
	Hartlepool Joint Hospital Order 1888 Provisional Order for altering a Confirming Act. (Note: Local Government Board's Provisional Orders Confirmation (No. 6) Act 1885 (48 & 49 Vict. c. cxxviii))	
	Leeds Order 1888 Provisional Order for altering certain Local Acts (Note: Leeds Improvement Act 1842 (5 & 6 Vict. c. civ)) (Note: Leeds Improvement Amendment Act 1848 (11 & 12 Vict. c. cii)) (Note: Leeds Improvement Amendment Act 1856 (19 & 20 Vict. c. cxv)) (Note: Leeds Improvement Act 1866 (29 & 30 Vict. c. clvii)) (Note: Leeds Improvement of Becks Act 1866 (29 & 30 Vict. c. cli)) (Note: Leeds Improvement Act 1869 (32 & 33 Vict. c. xi)) (Note: Leeds Corporation Gas and Improvements, &c. Act 1870 (33 & 34 Vict. c. xciii)) (Note: Leeds Improvement Act 1872 (35 & 36 Vict. c. xcvii)) (Note: Leeds Improvement Act 1877 (40 & 41 Vict. c. clxxviii)) (Note: Leeds Corporation Act 1879 (42 & 43 Vict. c. xxiii)) (Note: Leeds Waterworks Act 1847 (10 & 11 Vict. c. cclxii)) (Note: Leeds Waterworks (Wharfe Supply) Act 1852 (15 & 16 Vict. c. cii)) (Note: Leeds Waterworks (Wharfe Supply) Act 1856 (19 & 20 Vict. c. lxxx)) (Note: Leeds Waterworks Act 1862 (25 & 26 Vict. c. lii)) (Note: Leeds Waterworks Act 1867 (30 & 31 Vict. c. cxli)) (Note: Leeds Corporation Water Act 1874 (37 & 38 Vict. c. xxxiv)) and a Confirming Act. (Note: Local Government Board's Provisional Orders Confirmation (No. 8) Act 1883 (46 & 47 Vict. c. xcix))	
	Lytham Order 1888 Provisional Order for altering a Local Act. (Note: Lytham Improvement Act 1847 (10 & 11 Vict. c. ccli))	
	Normanby Order 1888 Provisional Order for extending the Local Government District of Normanby.	
	Openshaw Order 1888 Provisional Order for extending the Local Government District of Openshaw.	
	Oswaldtwistle Order 1888 Provisional Order for repealing a Confirming Act. (Note: Local Government Supplemental Act 1867 (No. 4) (30 & 31 Vict. c. 67))	
Local Government Board's Provisional Orders Confirmation (No. 10) Act 1888	51 & 52 Vict. c. cxxxiv	24 July 1888
An Act to confirm certain Provisional Orders of the Local Government Board relating to the City of Bath, the District of Bilston, the Local Government District of Saint Thomas-the-Apostle, and the Borough of Stoke-upon-Trent.
	Bath Order 1888 Provisional Order for altering certain Local Acts and a Confirming Act. (Note: Local Government Board's Provisional Orders Confirmation (Bath, &c.) Act 1876 (39 & 40 Vict. c. cci))	
	Bilston Order 1888 Provisional Order for altering a Local Act. (Note: Bilston Improvement Act 1850 (13 & 14 Vict. c. xcvi))	
	Saint Thomas-the-Apostle Order 1888 Provisional Order for diminishing the Local Government District of Saint Thomas-the-Apostle.	
	Stoke-upon-Trent Order 1888 Provisional Order for altering certain Local Acts.	
London Sea Water Supply Act 1888	51 & 52 Vict. c. cxxxv	24 July 1888
An Act to extend the time for constructing the Works of the London Sea Water Supply Company.
Rossendale Valley Tramways Act 1888 (repealed)	51 & 52 Vict. c. cxxxvi	24 July 1888
An Act for incorporating and conferring powers on the Rossendale Valley Tramways Company, and for other purposes. (Repealed by County of Lancashire Act 1984 (c. xxi))
Ulster Canal and Tyrone Navigation Act 1888	51 & 52 Vict. c. cxxxvii	24 July 1888
An Act for the acquisition by the Lagan Navigation Company of the Ulster Canal and the Tyrone Navigation or Coal Island Canal from the Commissioners of Public Works in Ireland and for other purposes.
Horse Guard's Avenue Act 1888	51 & 52 Vict. c. cxxxviii	24 July 1888
An Act to authorise the making of a new Street from Whitehall to the Victoria Embankment in the city and liberty of the city of Westminster and for other purposes.
Lambourn Valley Railway Act 1888	51 & 52 Vict. c. cxxxix	24 July 1888
An Act to confer further Powers on the Lambourn Valley Railway Company.
Lancashire and Yorkshire Railway Act 1888	51 & 52 Vict. c. cxl	24 July 1888
An Act for conferring further Powers on the Lancashire and Yorkshire Railway Company with relation to their Undertaking and to enable them to acquire the Undertaking of the Bury and Tottington District Railway Company and to confer further Powers on the Halifax High Level and North and South Junction Railway Company with respect to their Undertaking and for other purposes.
North Cornwall Railway Act 1888	51 & 52 Vict. c. cxli	7 August 1888
An Act to extend the Powers of the North Cornwall Railway Company and for other purposes.
West Ham Corporation (Loans) Act 1888 (repealed)	51 & 52 Vict. c. cxlii	7 August 1888
An Act to authorise the mayor, aldermen, and burgesses of the borough of West Ham to create Corporation Stock, and for other purposes. (Repealed by Local Law (London Borough of Newham) Order 1965 (SI 1965/509))
London and Saint Katharine and East and West India Docks Act 1888 (repealed)	51 & 52 Vict. c. cxliii	7 August 1888
An Act to authorise a working union of the undertakings of the London and Saint Katharine Docks Company and the East and West India Dock Company. (Repealed by Port of London (Consolidation) Act 1920 (10 & 11 Geo. 5. c. clxxiii))
London Tramways Company (Various Powers) Act 1888	51 & 52 Vict. c. cxliv	7 August 1888
An Act to authorise the London Tramways Company (Limited) to extend their existing tramway system to Tooting and for other purposes.
Manchester, Sheffield and Lincolnshire Railway (New Railways) Act 1888	51 & 52 Vict. c. cxlv	7 August 1888
An Act to authorise the Manchester Sheffield and Lincolnshire Railway Company to make new railways to confer further powers on the Company in connection with their undertaking and for other purposes.
Nelson Local Board Act 1888	51 & 52 Vict. c. cxlvi	7 August 1888
An Act to confer further powers upon the Local Board for the district of Nelson in the county of Lancaster with respect to their waterworks and gasworks undertakings and works for sewage disposal and for preventing the spread of infectious diseases; and for other purposes.
Didcot, Newbury and Southampton Railway Act 1888	51 & 52 Vict. c. cxlvii	7 August 1888
An Act to confer further powers on the Didcot Newbury and Southampton Railway Company and for other purposes.
Kensington Square Improvements Act 1888 (repealed)	51 & 52 Vict. c. cxlviii	7 August 1888
An Act to authorise the construction of new and widening of existing Streets and the taking of Lands in the parish of Saint Mary Abbotts Kensington in the county of Middlesex and for other purposes. (Repealed by London Government (Borough of Kensington) Order in Council 1901 (SR&O 1901/271))
Bristol Port Railway and Pier Act 1888	51 & 52 Vict. c. cxlix	7 August 1888
An Act to authorise the Bristol Port Railway and Pier Company to raise further money by Debenture Stock.
Manchester, Middleton and District Tramways Act 1888	51 & 52 Vict. c. cl	7 August 1888
An Act to extend the time for the compulsory purchase of Lands and for completing the Manchester Middleton and District Tramways and for other purposes.
Hampstead Heath Enlargement (Amendment) Act 1888	51 & 52 Vict. c. cli	7 August 1888
An Act to amend the Hampstead Heath Enlargement Act 1886. (Note: Hampstead Heath Enlargement Act 1886 (50 Vict. c. xli))
Epping Church Act 1888	51 & 52 Vict. c. clii	7 August 1888
An Act to provide for the pulling down of the Chapel of Saint John the Baptist in Epping and building a new Church and constituting such new Church the Parish Church of Epping in lieu of the existing Parish Church; and for other purposes.
Bristol Waterworks Act 1888	51 & 52 Vict. c. cliii	7 August 1888
An Act for the granting of further powers to the Bristol Waterworks Company; and for other purposes.
Hexham Local Board (Water) Act 1888	51 & 52 Vict. c. cliv	7 August 1888
An Act to empower the Hexham Local Board to make Waterworks and supply Water and for other purposes.
Lancaster Corporation Act 1888	51 & 52 Vict. c. clv	7 August 1888
An Act to extend the Boundaries of the Borough of Lancaster to confer further powers upon the Corporation of Lancaster with respect to their Gas and Water Undertakings and with respect to Street Improvements to make further provision for the good Government of the Borough and for other purposes.
Metropolitan Board of Works (Various Powers) Act 1888	51 & 52 Vict. c. clvi	7 August 1888
An Act to confer powers on the Metropolitan Board of Works with respect to the improvement of Streets and Bridges the providing and extending of Recreation Grounds and for other purposes.
Staffordshire Potteries Waterworks Act 1888	51 & 52 Vict. c. clvii	7 August 1888
An Act to extend the limits within which the Staffordshire Potteries Waterworks Company may supply Water and to empower them to construct additional Works to raise additional Capital and for other purposes.
London, Tilbury and Southend Railway Act 1888	51 & 52 Vict. c. clviii	7 August 1888
An Act to confer further powers on the London Tilbury and Southend Railway Company.
Commons Regulation (Therfield) Provisional Order Confirmation Act 1888	51 & 52 Vict. c. clix	7 August 1888
An Act to confirm a Provisional Order for the Regulation of Therfield Heath and Greens, situated in the parish of Therfield, in the county of Hertford, in pursuance of a report from the Land Commissioners for England.
	Therfield Heath and Greens Order 1888 Provisional Order for the Regulation of Therfield Heath and Greens, Hertfordshire.	
Worcester and Broom Railway (Extension of Time) Act 1888 (repealed)	51 & 52 Vict. c. clx	7 August 1888
An Act to extend the time for the compulsory purchase of Lands and for completing the Worcester and Broom Railway. (Repealed by Worcester and Broom Railway (Abandonment) Act 1894 (57 & 58 Vict. c. xi))
Manchester Ship Canal (Alteration of Works) Act 1888	51 & 52 Vict. c. clxi	7 August 1888
An Act to alter certain works authorised by the Manchester Ship Canal Act 1885; (Note: Manchester Ship Canal Act 1885 (48 & 49 Vict. c. clxxxviii)) and to alter the Boundaries between the Townships of Stretford and Salford and the Borough of Salford and the District of the Local Board of Stretford; and for other purposes.
Free Church of Scotland Ministers' and Missionaries' Widows' and Orphans' Fund Act 1888 (repealed)	51 & 52 Vict. c. clxii	7 August 1888
An Act to amend the Free Church Ministers' Widows' and Orphans' Fund Act, 1851; (Note: Free Church Ministers' Widows' and Orphans' Fund Act 1851 (14 & 15 Vict. c. lxxviii)) to extend the benefits of the Fund to the Widows and Orphans of Missionaries of the said Church labouring beyond the United Kingdom; and for other purposes. (Repealed by Churches and Universities (Scotland) Widows' and Orphans' Fund Order Confirmation Act 1930 (20 & 21 Geo. 5. c. cxxxiv))
North British Railway Act 1888	51 & 52 Vict. c. clxiii	7 August 1888
An Act to authorise the construction by the North British Railway Company of a railway from their South Queensferry Branch to their Edinburgh and Glasgow Railway; the maintenance of other railways; the purchase of additional lands; the amalgamation of the North Monkland Railways Company; the lease of the Newport Railway; and for other purposes.
Vale of Clyde Tramways Act 1888 (repealed)	51 & 52 Vict. c. clxiv	7 August 1888
An Act to confer further powers on the Vale of Clyde Tramways Company; and for other purposes. (Repealed by Glasgow Corporation Consolidation (Water, Transport and Markets) Order Confirmation Act 1964 (c. xliii))
Education Department Provisional Order Confirmation Act 1888	51 & 52 Vict. c. clxv	7 August 1888
An Act to confirm a Provisional Order made by the Education Department under the Elementary Education Act, 1870, to enable the School Board for London to put in force the Lands Clauses Consolidation Act, 1845, and the Acts amending the same.
	London Order 1888 The School Board for London. Provisional Order for putting in force the Lands Clauses Consolidation Act, 1845.	
Oyster and Mussel Fisheries (West Loch Tarbert) Order Confirmation Act 1888 (repealed)	51 & 52 Vict. c. clxvi	7 August 1888
An Act to confirm an Order made by the Secretary for Scotland under the Sea Fisheries Act, 1868, (Note: Sea Fisheries Act 1868 (31 & 32 Vict. c. 45)) relating to the West Loch Tarbert Oyster and Mussel Fisheries. (Repealed by Statute Law (Repeals) Act 1998 (c. 43))
	West Loch Tarbert Order 1888 Order for the Establishment and Maintenance by Messrs. William Hay and Company, Tarbert, of a several Oyster and Mussel Fishery in West Loch Tarbert, in the county of Argyll.	
Local Government Board's Provisional Order Confirmation (No. 13) Act 1888 (repealed)	51 & 52 Vict. c. clxvii	7 August 1888
An Act to confirm a Provisional Order of the Local Government Board relating to the Borough of Wolverhampton. (Repealed by Wolverhampton Corporation Act 1969 (c. lx))
	Wolverhampton Order 1888 Provisional Order for partially repealing and altering the Wolverhampton Improvement Act, 1869. (Note: Wolverhampton Improvement Act 1869 (32 & 33 Vict. c. cxxxi))	
Alabama Great Southern Railway Company Act 1888	51 & 52 Vict. c. clxviii	7 August 1888
An Act to make provision with reference to the arrears of dividend on the preference shares in the capital of the Alabama Great Southern Railway Company Limited.
Bristol Port Extension Railways (Cancellation of Bond) Act 1888	51 & 52 Vict. c. clxix	7 August 1888
An Act to provide for the cancelling of a bond entered into under the Bristol Port Extension Railways Act 1864. (Note: Bristol Port Extension Railways Act 1864 (27 & 28 Vict. c. cclvii))
Pier and Harbour Orders Confirmation (No. 2) Act 1888	51 & 52 Vict. c. clxx	7 August 1888
An Act to confirm certain Provisional Orders made by the Board of Trade under the General Pier and Harbour Act, 1861, relating to Torquay, and Tralee and Fenit.
	Torquay Harbour Order 1888 Order for amending the Torquay Harbour Act 1803 (Note: Torquay Harbour Act 1803 (43 Geo. 3. c. lxxxviii)) the Torquay Harbour Orders 1864 and 1868 and the Torquay Harbour and District Act 1886 (Note: Torquay Harbour and District Act 1886 (49 & 50 Vict. c. cxix)) and for the construction and maintenance and regulation of additional piers and works at or near Torquay in the county of Devon.	
	Tralee and Fenit Pier and Harbour Order 1888 Order for amending the Tralee and Fenit Pier and Harbour Order, 1880.	
Greenwich and Milwall Subway Act 1888	51 & 52 Vict. c. clxxi	7 August 1888
An Act to extend the powers of the Greenwich and Millwall Subway Company for the completion of their authorised Subway, and for other purposes.
Brighton Marine Palace and Pier Act 1888	51 & 52 Vict. c. clxxii	7 August 1888
An Act to incorporate and to confer powers upon the Brighton Marine Palace and Pier Company and for other purposes.
Ribble Navigation, &c. Act 1888 (repealed)	51 & 52 Vict. c. clxxiii	7 August 1888
An Act for enabling the Mayor Aldermen and Burgesses of the borough of Preston to deviate certain of the works authorised by the Ribble Navigation and Preston Dock Act 1883 (Note: Ribble Navigation and Preston Dock Act 1883 (46 & 47 Vict. c. cxv)) and for extending the said borough and for other purposes. (Repealed by Preston Borough Council Act 1981 (c. xxii))
Raleigh Park (Brixton) Act 1888 (repealed)	51 & 52 Vict. c. clxxiv	7 August 1888
An Act to authorise the acquisition of a House and Grounds known as Raleigh House and other Property at Brixton Hill in the county of Surrey and the Preservation thereof for Public Purposes. (Repealed by Local Law (Greater London Council and Inner London Boroughs) Order 1965 (SI 1965/540))
Llanelly Local Board Act 1888 (repealed)	51 & 52 Vict. c. clxxv	7 August 1888
An Act for enabling the Local Board of Health for the district of the borough of Llanelly to sell certain estates vested in them as trustees to appropriate for public purposes the sites of certain institutions vested in them as trustees on reinstating such institutions elsewhere and for altering the periods for the repayment of certain borrowed moneys making better provision for the health and government of the district; and for other purposes. (Repealed by Dyfed Act 1987 (c. xxiv))
London and North Western Railway Act 1888	51 & 52 Vict. c. clxxvi	7 August 1888
An Act for conferring further powers upon the London and North-western Railway Company in relation to their own undertaking and other undertakings in which they are interested jointly with other Companies and also for conferring powers upon the Great Western Railway Company the Midland Railway Company and other Railway Companies in relation to such other undertakings for dissolving the North Union Railway Company and the Preston and Wyre Railway Harbour and Dock Company and for appointing a joint committee of the Company and the Lancashire and Yorkshire Railway Company and for other.
Rhymney Railway Act 1888 (repealed)	51 & 52 Vict. c. clxxvii	7 August 1888
An Act to authorise the Rhymney Railway Company to make new Railways to confer further powers on the Company in connexion with their Undertaking; and for other purposes. (Repealed by Rhymney Railway Act 1895 (58 & 59 Vict. c. xxxv))
Vauxhall Park Act 1888 (repealed)	51 & 52 Vict. c. clxxviii	7 August 1888
An Act to authorise the acquisition of the Lawn and Carroun House, Lambeth, and its utilization for public purposes. (Repealed by Local Law (Greater London Council and Inner London Boroughs) Order 1965 (SI 1965/540))
West Ham Corporation (Improvements) Act 1888	51 & 52 Vict. c. clxxix	7 August 1888
An Act to authorise the Corporation of the Borough of West Ham to construct certain Improvements and other works and to make provision for the transfer to such Corporation of the jurisdiction within the said borough of the Commissioners of Sewers for Havering Dagenham and other levels and for the good government of the borough to enable the said Corporation to borrow money and for other purposes.
Plymouth, Devonport and South Western Junction Railway Act 1888	51 & 52 Vict. c. clxxx	7 August 1888
An Act to confer further Powers on the Plymouth Devonport and South Western Junction Railway Company.
Birmingham and Henley-in-Arden Railway Act 1888	51 & 52 Vict. c. clxxxi	7 August 1888
An Act to revive the powers and extend the periods for the compulsory purchase of Lands and for the construction of the Railway authorised by the Henley-in-Arden and Great Western Junction Railway Act 1873 (Note: Henley-in-Arden and Great Western Junction Railway Act 1873 (36 & 37 Vict. c. ccxxxviii)) and the Henley-in-Arden and Great Western Junction Railway (Revival of Powers) Act 1884 (Note: Henley-in-Arden and Great Western Junction Railway (Revival of Powers) Act 1884 (47 & 48 Vict. c. lxvii)) and for other purposes.
Barry Dock and Railways Act 1888	51 & 52 Vict. c. clxxxii	7 August 1888
An Act to enable the Barry Dock and Railways Company to purchase additional lands and make certain works near Barry Island and for other purposes.
Kingston-upon-Thames Improvement Act 1888	51 & 52 Vict. c. clxxxiii	7 August 1888
An Act to confer further powers on the Mayor Aldermen and Burgesses of the borough of Kingston-upon-Thames for the improvement and good government of the borough and for other purposes.
Metropolitan Outer Circle Railway Act 1888 (repealed)	51 & 52 Vict. c. clxxxiv	7 August 1888
An Act for making Railways in the County of Middlesex, to be called the Metropolitan Outer Circle Railway and for other purposes. (Repealed by Metropolitan Outer Circle Railway (Abandonment) Act 1895 (58 & 59 Vict. c. vi))
Oxford and Aylesbury Tramroad Act 1888	51 & 52 Vict. c. clxxxv	7 August 1888
An Act to authorise the abandonment of the Railway authorised by the Oxford Aylesbury and Metropolitan Junction Railway Act 1883 (Note: Oxford, Aylesbury and Metropolitan Junction Railway Act 1883 (46 & 47 Vict. c. ccx)) and the construction of a Tramroad instead thereof.
South Eastern Metropolitan Tramways Act 1888	51 & 52 Vict. c. clxxxvi	7 August 1888
An Act for making Tramways in the parishes of Lewisham and Greenwich, in the county of Kent; and for other purposes.
Tottenham Local Board (Division of District) Act 1888 (repealed)	51 & 52 Vict. c. clxxxvii	7 August 1888
An Act to divide the District of the Local Board of Health of Tottenham in the County of Middlesex and for other purposes. (Repealed by Local Law (North West London Boroughs) Order 1965 (SI 1965/533))
Cheadle Railway Mineral and Land Company Act 1888	51 & 52 Vict. c. clxxxviii	7 August 1888
An Act for authorising the Cheadle Railway Mineral and Land Company Limited to construct a Railway in the Parishes of Draycott-in-the-Moors and Cheadle in the County of Stafford; and for other purposes.
Chesham, Boxmoor and Hemel Hempsted Steam Tramways Act 1888	51 & 52 Vict. c. clxxxix	7 August 1888
An Act for incorporating the Chesham Boxmoor and Hemel Hempsted Steam Tramways Company and empowering them to construct tramways; and for other purposes.
Medina Subway Act 1888	51 & 52 Vict. c. cxc	7 August 1888
An Act to revive and extend the powers for the compulsory purchase of Lands granted by the Medina Subway Act 1884 (Note: Medina Subway Act 1884 (47 & 48 Vict. c. cclx)) for the purposes of the subway authorised by that Act.
Collingbourne and Avon Valley Railway Act 1888	51 & 52 Vict. c. cxci	7 August 1888
An Act for making a Railway to be called "the Collingbourne and Avon Valley Railway," and for other purposes.
Shropshire Railways Act 1888	51 & 52 Vict. c. cxcii	7 August 1888
An Act to incorporate the Shropshire Railways Company to empower them to acquire the Potteries Shrewsbury and North Wales Railway and to construct further railways and for other purposes.
Forest of Dean Turnpike Trust Abolition Act 1888 (repealed)	51 & 52 Vict. c. cxciii	10 August 1888
An Act for the abolition of the Forest of Dean Turnpike Trust. (Repealed by Statute Law (Repeals) Act 2013 (c. 2))
Glasgow Central Railway Act 1888	51 & 52 Vict. c. cxciv	10 August 1888
An Act to authorise the construction of Railways from the Dalmarnock Branch of the Caledonian Railway to Maryhill with Branches to the Railway Depôts at Stobcross, and other Works in connection therewith; and for other purposes.
Bridgwater Railway Act 1888	51 & 52 Vict. c. cxcv	10 August 1888
An Act for conferring further powers on the Bridgewater Railway Company.
Llangammarch and Neath and Brecon Junction Railway Act 1888 (repealed)	51 & 52 Vict. c. cxcvi	10 August 1888
An Act to extend the Time for purchasing Land and completing the Llangammarch and Neath and Brecon Junction Railway. (Repealed by Llangammarch and Neath and Brecon Junction Railway (Abandonment) Act 1890 (53 & 54 Vict. c. xxvi))
Wrexham and Ellesmere Railway Act 1888	51 & 52 Vict. c. cxcvii	10 August 1888
An Act to extend the time for the purchase of Lands and for the completion of the Wrexham and Ellesmere Railway; and for other purposes.
Mersey Railway Act 1888	51 & 52 Vict. c. cxcviii	10 August 1888
An Act for making further provision respecting the capital and undertaking of the Mersey Railway Company and for other purposes.
Kirkliston, Dalmeny and South Queensferry Water Supply Confirmation Act 1888	51 & 52 Vict. c. cxcix	13 August 1888
An Act to confirm a Provisional Order under the Public Health (Scotland) Act, 1867, relating to Kirkliston, Dalmeny, and South Queensferry Water.
	Kirkliston, Dalmeny and South Queensferry Water Supply Order 1888 Kirkliston, Dalmeny, and South Queensferry Water. Public Health (Scotland) Act, 1867. (30 & 31 Vict. c. 101.) Provisional Order.	
Rotherham and Bawtry Railway Abandonment Act 1888 (repealed)	51 & 52 Vict. c. cc	13 August 1888
An Act for the abandonment of the Rotherham and Bawtry Railway. (Repealed by Statute Law (Repeals) Act 2013 (c. 2))
Great Western Railway Act 1888	51 & 52 Vict. c. cci	13 August 1888
An Act for conferring further powers upon the Great Western Railway Company in connexion with their own and other undertakings and upon them and other companies in connexion with undertakings in which they are jointly interested for vesting in the Great Western Railway Company the undertakings of the Leominster and Bromyard and the Worcester Bromyard and Leominster Railway Companies and the powers of the Kingsbridge and Salcombe Railway Company and for authorising and confirming agreements with other Railway Companies and for other purposes.
Great Western and Great Northern Junction Railway Act 1888 (repealed)	51 & 52 Vict. c. ccii	13 August 1888
An Act to incorporate a company for the construction of Railways between Southall and Edgware in the county of Middlesex to be called the Great Western and Great Northern Junction Railway; and for other purposes. (Repealed by Great Western and Great Northern Junction Railway (Abandonment) Act 1891 (54 & 55 Vict. c. cxx))

=== Private and personal acts ===
Short title	Citation	Royal assent
Long title
Earl of Winchilsea and Nottingham's Estate Act 1888	51 & 52 Vict. c. 1 Pr.	24 July 1888
An Act to authorise the raising of a sum of Money on the Settled Estates of the Earl of Winchilsea and Nottingham and for other purposes relating thereto.
Joynt's Divorce Act 1888 (Note: This act was not printed by the Queen's Printer.)	51 & 52 Vict. c. 2 Pr.	24 July 1888
An Act to dissolve the Marriage of Richard Watson Joynt, of Ballina, in the County of Mayo, Ireland, Newspaper Proprietor, with Charlotte Barker Joynt, his now Wife, and to enable him to marry again, and for other purposes.

=== Sources ===
- The Public General Statutes, Volume 25: 51 & 52 Victoria – 1888. Law reports. Eyre and Spottiswoode – via HathiTrust.
- The Public General Acts of the United Kingdom of Great Britain and Ireland ... Vol. 25. Eyre and Spottiswoode. 1888 – via Google Books.

== See also ==
- List of acts of the Parliament of the United Kingdom
