= Martin Francis =

Martin Francis is a British-American academic historian. He was Henry R. Winkler Professor of Modern History at the University of Cincinnati from 2003 to 2015, when he was appointed Professor of War and History at the University of Sussex.

== Biography ==
Martin Francis was awarded a Bachelor of Arts (BA) degree from the University of Manchester in 1985, and went on to complete a doctorate (DPhil) at the University of Oxford in 1994, awarded for a thesis entitled "Labour policies and socialist ideas: the example of the Attlee government, 1945–1951". Francis taught at Corpus Christi College, Oxford, the University of Wales, Aberystwyth, and Royal Holloway, University of London, before being appointed Henry R. Winkler Professor of Modern History at the University of Cincinnati in 2003. In 2015, he returned to the United Kingdom as Professor of War and History at the University of Sussex.

== Research ==
Francis's work focuses on 20th-century British politics and gender; he has written on the Labour Party, masculinity, leisure, the cultural impact of modern warfare, the emotional economy in British politics, and British cinema. His published works include:

== Works ==
=== Books ===
- The Flyer: British Culture and the Royal Air Force, 1939–1945 (Oxford University Press, 2008).
- Ideas and Policies under Labour, 1945–1951: Building a New Britain (Manchester University Press, 1997).
- (Co-edited with Ina Zweiniger-Bargielowska) The Conservatives and British Society, 1880–1990 (University of Wales Press, 1996).

=== Articles ===
- "Old Realisms: The Labour Party Policy Review in Historical Perspective", Labour History Review, vol. 56, no. 1 (1991).
- "Economics and Ethics: the Nature of Labour's Socialism, 1945–51", Twentieth Century British History, vol. 6, no.2 (1995).
- "A Socialist Policy for Education?: Labour and the Secondary School, 1945–1951", History of Education, vol. 24, no.3 (1995).
- "'Not Reformed Capitalism, but ... Democratic Socialism': The Ideology of the Labour Leadership, 1945-51", in Harriet Jones and Michael Kandiah (eds.), The Myth of Consensus (Macmillan, 1996).
- "'Mr. Gaitskell's Ganymede'?: Reassessing Crosland's Future of Socialism (1956)", Contemporary British History, vol. 11m no.2 (1997).
- "The Labour Party: Modernisation and the Politics of Restraint", in Frank Mort, Becky Conekin and Chris Waters (eds.), Moments of Modernity: Reconstructing Britain, 1945–64 (New York University Press, 1999).
- "Labour and Gender", in D. Tanner et al. (eds.), Labour's First Century: A Centenary History of the Labour Party (Cambridge University Press, 2000).
- "Leisure and Popular Culture", in Ina Zweiniger-Bargielowska (ed.), Women in Twentieth Century Britain: Economic, Social and Cultural Change (Longman, 2001).
- "Tears, Tantrums and Bared Teeth: The Emotional Economy of Three Conservative Prime Ministers, 1951–1964", Journal of British Studies, vol. 41, no.3 (2002).
- "The Domestication of the Male? Recent Research on Nineteenth- and Twentieth-Century British Masculinity", Historical Journal, vol. 45, no.3 (2002).
- "Cecil Beaton’s Romantic Toryism and the Symbolic Economy of Wartime Britain", Journal of British Studies, vol. 45, no.1 (2006).
- "A Flight from Commitment? Domesticity, Adventure and the Masculine Imaginary in Postwar Britain", Gender and History, vol. 19, no.1 (2007).
- "Men of the Royal Air Force, the Cultural Memory of World War Two and the Twilight of the British Empire", in Sue Grayzel and Philippa Levine (eds.), Gender, Labour, War and Empire: Essays on Modern Britain in honour of Sonya Rose (Palgrave, 2009).
- "Remembering War, Forgetting Empire: Cinematic Representations of the North African Campaign in the Era of Decolonization", in Lucy Noakes and Juliette Pattinson (eds.), The Cultural Memory of the Second World War in Britain (London: Bloomsbury, 2014).
- "Attending to Ghosts: Some Reflections on the Disavowals of British Great War Historiography", Twentieth Century British History, vol. 25, no. 3 (2014).
