= Ina Zweiniger-Bargielowska =

British-American academic historian

Ina-Maria Zweiniger-Bargielowska, known professionally as Ina Zweiniger-Bargielowska, is a British-American academic historian specialising in 20th-century Britain. Since 2010, she has been professor of history at the University of Illinois at Chicago.

== Biography ==
Zweiniger-Bargielowska completed her undergraduate studies at Queen Mary College, University of London, graduating in 1985 with a first-class Bachelor of Arts (BA) degree in history and politics; she then carried out doctoral studies at the University of Cambridge, which awarded her a doctorate (DPhil) in 1990 for her thesis entitled "Industrial relationships and nationalisation in the South Wales coalmining industry". Her supervisor was Barry Supple.

From 1989 to 1990, Zweiniger-Bargielowska was a Research Fellow at the Institute of Historical Research, part of the University of London; she then spent three years as a Prize Research Fellow at Nuffield College, Oxford, before taking up a lectureship at the University of Wales, Aberystwyth, in 1993. In 2000, she was appointed assistant professor of history at the University of Illinois at Chicago (UIC) and a year later became an associate professor there. In 2010, she was appointed professor of history at UIC.

== Research ==
Zweiniger-Bargielowska's research focuses on 20th-century British history; she has written on the Conservative Party, rationing in the United Kingdom, female consumers and the body, lifestyle and public health. Her publications include:

== Works ==
=== Books ===
- (Edited with R. Duffett and A. Drouard) Food and War in Twentieth Century Europe (Ashgate: Farnham, 2011).
  - She wrote the introduction and the chapter "Fair Shares? The Limits of Food Policy in Britain during the Second World War".
- Managing the Body: Beauty, Health and Fitness in Britain, 1880s–1939 (Oxford University Press: Oxford, 2010).
- (Editor) Women in Twentieth Century Britain (Pearson Education: Harlow, 2001).
  - She wrote the introduction and the chapters on "Housewifery" and "The Body and Consumer Culture".
- Austerity in Britain: Rationing, Controls and Consumption, 1939–1955 (Oxford University Press: Oxford, 2000).
- (Edited with Martin Francis) The Conservatives and British Society, 1880–1990 (University of Wales Press: Cardiff, 1996).
  - She co-authored the introduction with Martin Francis and wrote the chapter "Explaining the Gender Gap: The Conservative Party and the Women's Vote, 1945–1964".

=== Articles and chapters ===
- "The Making of a Modern Female Body: Beauty, Health and Fitness in Interwar Britain", Women's History Review, vol. 20, no. 2 (2011), pp. 299–317.
- "Slimming through the Depression: Obesity and Reducing in Interwar Britain", in D. J. Oddy, P. J. Atkins and V. Amilien (eds.), The Rise of Obesity in Europe: A Twentieth Century Food History (Ashgate: Farnham, 2009), pp. 177–191.
- "Raising a Nation of 'Good Animals': The New Health Society and Health Education Campaigns in Interwar Britain', Social History of Medicine, vol. 20, no. 1 (2007), pp. 73–89.
- "Building a British Superman: Physical Culture in Interwar Britain", Journal of Contemporary History, vol. 41, no. 4 (2006), pp. 595–610.
- "'The Culture of the Abdomen': Obesity and Reducing in Britain, c. 1900–1939", Journal of British Studies, vol. 44, no. 2 (2005), pp. 239–273.
- "Living Standards and Consumption", in P. Addison and H. Jones (eds.), Blackwell Companion to British History: Contemporary Britain, 1939–2000 (Blackwell: Oxford, 2005), pp. 226–244.
- "Women under Austerity: Fashion in Britain during the 1940s", in M. Donald and L. Hurcombe (eds.), Representations of Gender from Prehistory to the Present (Macmillan: Basingstoke, 2000), pp. 218–237.
- "Rationing, Austerity and the Conservative Party Recovery after 1945", The Historical Journal, vol. 37, no. 1 (1994), pp. 173–197.
- "South Wales Miners' Attitudes towards Nationalization: An Essay in Oral History", Llafur, vol. 6, no. 3 (1994), pp. 70–84.
- "Bread Rationing in Britain, July 1946 – July 1948", Twentieth Century British History, vol. 4, no. 1 (1993), pp. 57–85.
- "Miners' Militancy: A Study of four South Wales Collieries during the Middle of the Twentieth Century", Welsh History Review, vol. 16, no. 3 (1993), pp. 356–389.
- "Colliery Managers and Nationalization: The Experience in South Wales", Business History, vol. 34, no. 4 (1992), pp. 59–78.
