= C. L. Mowat =

American historian

Charles Loch Mowat (4 October 1911 – 23 June 1970) was a British-born American historian.

== Biography ==
Mowat was educated at Marlborough College and St John's College, Oxford. In 1934 he emigrated to the United States, where he became an American citizen. From 1934 until 1936 he taught at the University of Minnesota. In 1936 he took up a position at the University of California, Los Angeles. His opposition to McCarthyism led to him leaving UCLA and taking a post at the University of Chicago in 1950. In 1958 he returned to Britain to be professor of history at the University College of North Wales, Bangor, a post he held until 1970.

His best known book is Britain Between the Wars, which became the standard text on the nation's interwar period. A. J. P. Taylor wrote the volume in the Oxford History of England covering 1914–1945. After he was asked how he found out what basically happened in the period, Taylor answered: "I looked it up in Mowat".

== Works ==
- East Florida as a British Province, 1763-84 (1943).
- Britain Between the Wars, 1918–1940 (1955).
- The Charity Organisation Society, 1869–1913 (1961).
- The Golden Valley Railway (1964).
