= Peter Atkins (geographer) =

English academic

Peter J. Atkins is emeritus professor of geography at Durham University. He is a specialist in food history and the geography of food.

== Selected publications ==
- Atkins, P.J. A History of Uncertainty: Bovine Tuberculosis in Britain, 1850 to the Present. Winchester: Winchester University Press; 2016.
- Atkins, P.J. (Ed.) Animal Cities: Beastly Urban Histories Farnham: Ashgate; 2012.
- Atkins, P.J. Liquid materialities: a history of milk, science and the law. Farnham: Ashgate; 2010.
- Atkins, P.J. & Bowler, I.R. Food in Society, economy, culture, geography. London New York: Arnold; 2001.
- Atkins, P.J., Simmons, I.G. & Roberts, B.K. People, Land and Time. Arnold; 1998.
- Raw, M. & Atkins, P.J. Agriculture and Food. Collins Educational; 1995.
- Atkins, P.J. The Directories of London, 1677-1977. Mansell; 1990.
