= Frank Mort =

British historian, author and broadcaster

Frank Mort FRHistS, is a British historian, author and broadcaster who is currently Emeritus Professor of Cultural History at the University of Manchester, UK. His work is on urban history, modern sexuality, consumer culture and the history of the British monarchy.

== Education ==
Mort grew up in Cheshire and Derbyshire. He was educated at Buxton College Grammar School and then at the University of York (BA English and Related Literature) and the Centre for Contemporary Cultural Studies, University of Birmingham, where he completed his PhD with Stuart Hall and Richard Johnson.

== Career ==
Mort was Senior Lecturer and then Reader at the University of Portsmouth (1986–97) before being appointed founding Director of the Raphael Samuel History Centre, University of East London (1998–2004). He then joined the University of Manchester as Professor of Cultural Histories (2004–23) and he was founding Director of the Centre for Interdisciplinary Research in the Arts, CIDRA (2004–08). He was a Labour councillor for the London Borough of Islington between 1986 and 1990. Mort has held visiting professorships and fellowships at the Universities of Columbia, Johns Hopkins, Michigan and Princeton, and at the National Humanities Center (USA). He is on the editorial and advisory boards of journals that include Cultural and Social History and Twentieth Century British History, together with the Palgrave Studies in Modern Monarchy book series.

== Publications ==
- Dangerous Sexualities. Medico-Moral Politics in England since 1830 (1987), second edition (2001) ISBN 9780415167338
- Moments of Modernity. Reconstructing Britain 1945-64 (edited with Becky Conekin and Chris Waters) (1999). ISBN 9781854891051
- Cultures of Consumption: Masculinities and Social Space in Late-Twentieth Century Britain (1996) ISBN 9780415030526
  - Chinese edition (2000)
- Commercial Cultures. Economies, Practices and Spaces (edited with Peter Jackson, Michele Lowe and Daniel Miller) (2000) ISBN 9781859733820
- Capital Affairs: London and the Making of the Permissive Society (2010). ISBN 9780300118797
