= List of acts of the 1st session of the 44th Parliament of the United Kingdom =

This is a list of acts of the 1st session of the 44th Parliament of the United Kingdom, which ran from 18 April 1966 until 27 October 1967.

Acts passed since 1963 are cited by calendar year, as opposed to the convention used for earlier acts of citing the regnal year(s) in which the relevant parliamentary session was held. Each act passed in a respective year is given a chapter number (abbreviated "c."), denoted by Arabic numerals in the case of public general acts, lowercase Roman numerals in the case of local acts, or italicised Arabic numerals in the case of personal acts. These run as separate series.

207 acts of Parliament were passed by the 44th Parliament in its 1st session: 127 public general acts and 80 local acts.

indicates that an act is available to view at legislation.gov.uk, and indicates the location of the original act in the Parliamentary Archives.

== Public general acts ==
{{legislationuk|act |- | {{|Guyana Independence Act 1966|public|14|12-05-1966|maintained=y|An Act to provide for the attainment by British Guiana of fully responsible status within the Commonwealth; to make provision as to the effect of certain certificates of naturalisation; and for purposes connected with the matters aforesaid.}} |- | {{|Military Aircraft (Loans) Act 1966|public|15|26-05-1966|maintained=y|An Act to provide money for the purchase of military aircraft, and parts, equipment and other articles for, or for use in connection with, military aircraft, and for the making of payments in respect of costs (including development, testing and training costs) incurred in connection therewith; and for connected purposes.}} |- | {{|Public Works Loans Act 1966|public|16|26-05-1966|An Act to grant money for the purpose of certain local loans out of the Local Loans Fund.}} |- | {{|Transport Finances Act 1966|public|17|26-05-1966|An Act to make further provision for the payment of grants to the British Railways Board and the British Waterways Board on account of deficits on revenue account down to the end of the year 1968; to authorise the payment of such grants to the London Transport Board; to continue the temporary suspension under section 64 of the Transport Act 1962 of the liability of the British Waterways Board to maintain inland waterways; and for purposes connected with the matters aforesaid.}} |- | {{|Finance Act 1966|public|18|03-08-1966|maintained=y|An Act to grant certain duties, to alter other duties, and to amend the law relating to the National Debt and the Public Revenue, and to make further provision in connection with Finance.}} |- | {{|Law Reform (Miscellaneous Provisions) (Scotland) Act 1966|public|19|03-08-1966|maintained=y|An Act to exempt from arrestment on the dependence of an action sums falling to be paid by way of wages, salary or other earnings or by way of pension, to abolish the exemption from arrestment in execution of certain earnings payable by the Crown, and to provide for the variation from time to time of the amount of wages excepted from arrestment under the Wages Arrestment Limitation (Scotland) Act 1870; to amend section 5 of the Adoption Act 1958, and to provide in Scotland for the succession of an adopted person to the estate of his natural parent in certain circumstances; to amend section 5 of the Trusts (Scotland) Act 1961; to provide for the admission in evidence of certain documents in civil proceedings; to confer jurisdiction on the sheriff court to vary or recall certain orders of the Court of Session in respect of maintenance, custody and welfare of children; to provide for the extension of certain time limits in appeals under the Summary Jurisdiction (Scotland) Act 1954; and to provide that acts of adjournal and acts of sederunt shall be statutory instruments.}} |- | {{|Ministry of Social Security Act 1966|public|20|03-08-1966|An Act to provide for the appointment of a Minister of Social Security and the transfer to him of the functions of the Minister of Pensions and National Insurance and of certain functions of the National Assistance Board; to replace Part II of the National Assistance Act 1948 by provisions giving rights to non-contributory benefit; and for purposes connected with those matters.}} |- | {{|Overseas Aid Act 1966|public|21|03-08-1966|An Act to make provision as to the power of the Minister of Overseas Development to provide assistance to, or for the benefit of, overseas countries and territories; to enable effect to be given to an international agreement for the establishment and operation of an Asian Development Bank; to enable the said Minister to make further contributions to the Indus Basin Development Fund and to remit interest on certain advances to the Commonwealth Development Corporation; to amend section 2 of the Colonial Development and Welfare Act 1959 and section 1 of the Commonwealth Teachers Act 1960; and to provide for the establishment and administration of an Overseas Service Pensions Scheme.}} |- | {{|Malawi Republic Act 1966|public|22|03-08-1966|maintained=y|An Act to make provision as to the operation of the law in relation to Malawi as a republic within the Commonwealth.}} |- | {{|Botswana Independence Act 1966|public|23|03-08-1966|maintained=y|An Act to make provision for, and in connection with, the establishment of the Bechuanaland Protectorate, under the name of Botswana, as an independent republic within the Commonwealth.}} |- | {{|Lesotho Independence Act 1966|public|24|03-08-1966|maintained=y|An Act to make provision for, and in connection with, the establishment of Basutoland, under the name of Lesotho, as an independent kingdom within the Commonwealth.}} |- | {{|Post Office (Subway) Act 1966|public|25|03-08-1966|An Act to authorise the Postmaster General to construct a subway in the City of Birmingham.}} |- | {{|Appropriation (No. 2) Act 1966|public|26|09-08-1966|An Act to apply a sum out of the Consolidated Fund to the service of the year ending on 31st March 1967, and to appropriate the supplies granted in this Session of Parliament.}} |- | {{|Building Control Act 1966|public|27|09-08-1966|maintained=y|An Act to regulate building and constructional work.}} |- | {{|Docks and Harbours Act 1966|public|28|09-08-1966|maintained=y|An Act to make further provision for regulating the employment of dock workers, including provision for compensating persons prohibited from employing, or working on their own account as, dock workers and for raising sums required for paying such compensation; to make provision for welfare amenities in ports; to confer additional powers on harbour authorities; to provide for the assumption by harbour authorities as successors to certain other harbour authorities of a proportion of the debts of those other authorities; to make further provision for giving financial assistance in connection with the construction and improvement of harbours and the carrying out of harbour operations, and with respect to the orders and schemes which may be made under the Harbours Act 1964, the charges which may be made by certain harbour authorities and lighthouse authorities, the policing of harbours and the furnishing of information and forecasts and the promotion of research, training and education under that Act; and for purposes connected with the matters aforesaid.}} |- | {{|Singapore Act 1966|public|29|09-08-1966|maintained=y|An Act to make provision in connection with the establishment of Singapore as an independent sovereign state within the Commonwealth.}} |- | {{|Reserve Forces Act 1966|public|30|09-08-1966|An Act to make further provision with respect to reserve forces, associations established for the purposes of the Auxiliary Forces Act 1953, the discharge of men of the regular army and air force and the qualifications for appointment as deputy lieutenant; and for purposes connected with the matters aforesaid.}} |- | {{|Criminal Appeal Act 1966|public|31|09-08-1966|An Act to transfer the Court of Criminal Appeal's jurisdiction to hear appeals in criminal cases to the Court of Appeal; to amend the law relating to such appeals in England and Northern Ireland and appeals to the Courts-Martial Appeal Court; to amend the provisions of the Army Act 1955 and the Air Force Act 1955 relating to the powers of confirming officers; and for connected purposes.}} |- | {{|Selective Employment Payments Act 1966|public|32|09-08-1966|maintained=y|An Act to provide for payments in certain circumstances in respect of persons in respect of whom selective employment tax has been paid; and for connected purposes.}} |- | {{|Prices and Incomes Act 1966|public|33|12-08-1966|An Act to establish a National Board for Prices and Incomes, and authorise the bringing into force of provisions requiring notice of price increases, pay increases and other matters, and for enforcing a temporary standstill in prices or charges or terms and conditions of employment; in connection with recommendations made by the said Board, to amend the Restrictive Trade Practices Act 1956; to provide, for a period lasting not more than twelve months, for restricting price increases and pay increases and for other matters connected with prices and incomes; and for connected purposes.}} |- | {{|Industrial Development Act 1966|public|34|12-08-1966|maintained=y|An Act to provide for the making of grants out of moneys provided by Parliament towards expenditure on the provision of new business assets; to provide for the exercise of powers under the Local Employment Acts 1960 and 1963 in relation to new development areas and to make other amendments in those Acts; to make new provision in relation to industrial development certificates; to amend section 3 of the Sea Fish Industry Act 1962; and for connected purposes.}} |- | {{|Family Provision Act 1966|public|35|17-11-1966|maintained=y|An Act to amend the law of England and Wales in relation to the rights after a person's death of that person's spouse or former spouse and children, and to repeal section 47(5) of the Administration of Estates Act 1925, as amended.}} |- | {{|Veterinary Surgeons Act 1966|public|36|17-11-1966|maintained=y|An Act to make fresh provision for the management of the veterinary profession, for the registration of veterinary surgeons and veterinary practitioners, for regulating their professional education and professional conduct and for cancelling or suspending registration in cases of misconduct; and for connected purposes.}} |- | {{|Barbados Independence Act 1966|public|37|17-11-1966|maintained=y|An Act to make provision for, and in connection with, the attainment by Barbados of fully responsible status within the Commonwealth.}} |- | {{|Sea Fisheries Regulation Act 1966|public|38|17-11-1966|maintained=y|An Act to consolidate (with corrections and improvements made under the Consolidation of Enactments (Procedure) Act 1949) the Sea Fisheries Regulation Acts 1888 to 1930 and certain other enactments relating to the sea fisheries of England and Wales.}} |- | {{|Land Registration Act 1966|public|39|13-12-1966|maintained=y|An Act to alter the provisions of Part XI of the Land Registration Act 1925 relating to the making of orders creating areas of compulsory registration, to restrict the rights under that Act to register unregistered land in other areas, to amend its provisions relating to losses indemnifiable under that Act and to repeal section 11 of the Small Holdings and Allotments Act 1926.}} |- | {{|Expiring Laws Continuance Act 1966|public|40|13-12-1966|An Act to continue certain expiring laws.}} |- | {{|Arbitration (International Investment Disputes) Act 1966|public|41|13-12-1966|maintained=y|An Act to implement an international Convention on the settlement of investment disputes between States and nationals of other States.}} |- | {{|Local Government Act 1966|public|42|13-12-1966|maintained=y|An Act to make further provision, in relation to England and Wales, with respect to the payment of grants to local authorities, rating and valuation, the classification and lighting of highways and the powers of local authorities to place staff and facilities at the disposal of Ministers concerned with highways and to make payments offsetting the effect of the selective employment tax; to repeal or amend certain enactments relating to local licences and registrations; and for purposes connected with the matters aforesaid.}} |- | {{|Tribunals and Inquiries Act 1966|public|43|13-12-1966|An Act to extend sections 1 and 7A of the Tribunals and Inquiries Act 1958 to further classes of statutory inquiries and hearings; to transfer to the Secretary of State the power to make rules of procedure under the said section 7A in respect of inquiries and hearings in Scotland; to apply section 8 of that Act to procedural rules made by the Commissioners of Inland Revenue; to make provision with respect to the attendance of members of the Council on Tribunals at personal hearings under section 231 of the Local Government Act 1933; and for purposes connected with the matters aforesaid.}} |- | {{|New Towns Act 1966|public|44|13-12-1966|An Act to raise the limit on advances imposed by section 43 of the New Towns Act 1965; to amend the Land Compensation Act 1961 and the Land Compensation (Scotland) Act 1963 in connection with extensions made after the commencement of this Act to the areas of new towns; to repeal provisions of section 46 of the New Towns Act 1965 and section 13 of the New Towns Act 1946 relating to certain accounts and reports; and for purposes connected with the matters aforesaid.}} |- | {{|Armed Forces Act 1966|public|45|21-12-1966|maintained=y|An Act to continue the Army Act 1955 and the Air Force Act 1955; to amend those Acts and the Naval Discipline Act 1957; to make fresh provision as to the engagement of persons for service in the Royal Navy, regular army and regular air force and as to the discharge and prolongation of service of ratings of the Royal Navy; to make provision as to the transfer to the reserve of such ratings; to provide for the taking into service custody in certain circumstances of persons overseas and subject to service law; and for purposes connected with the matters aforesaid.}} |- | {{|Bus Fuel Grants Act 1966|public|46|21-12-1966|An Act to extend section 92 of the Finance Act 1965 so as to enable grants to be made under that section in respect of surcharges under section 9 of the Finance Act 1961 on customs and excise duties charged on fuel used in operating stage carriage services and to enable provision to be made in Northern Ireland for similar purposes.}} |- | {{|National Coal Board (Additional Powers) Act 1966|public|47|21-12-1966|maintained=y|An Act to confer on the National Coal Board certain powers with respect to petroleum within the meaning of the Petroleum (Production) Act 1934; and for connected purposes.}} |- | {{|Films Act 1966|public|48|21-12-1966|maintained=y|An Act to extend the periods during which loans, advances and orders may be made under the Cinematograph Film Production (Special Loans) Acts 1949 to 1957, a levy is to be imposed under the Cinematograph Films Act 1957 and a quota of British films is to be maintained under the Films Acts 1960 and 1964; to raise the limit of exemptions from the quota; to increase the maximum fee payable on an application for the registration of a co-production film; and for connected purposes.}} |- | {{|Housing (Scotland) Act 1966|public|49|21-12-1966|An Act to consolidate certain enactments relating to housing in Scotland, with the exception of certain provisions relating to financial matters.}} |- | {{|Industrial Reorganisation Corporation Act 1966|public|50|21-12-1966|An Act to provide for the establishment of a public corporation with the functions of promoting or assisting the reorganisation or development of any industry or section of an industry and establishing or developing, or promoting the establishment or development of, any industrial enterprise, and for matters relating to the corporation and its functions.}} |- | {{|Local Government (Scotland) Act 1966|public|51|21-12-1966|maintained=y|An Act to make further provision, in relation to Scotland, with respect to the payment of grants to local authorities, valuation and rating, local authority expenditure and functions, and the classification and lighting of highways; to repeal or amend certain enactments relating to local licences and registrations; and for purposes connected with the matters aforesaid.}} |- | {{|Police (Scotland) Act 1966|public|52|21-12-1966|An Act to amend section 18(2) of the Police (Scotland) Act 1956.}} |- | {{|Land Commission Act 1967|public|1|01-02-1967|An Act to provide for the establishment of a Land Commission, to make provision as to the finances of the Commission and to confer on the Commission powers to acquire, manage and dispose of land; to impose a betterment levy in respect of land; to make further provision as to compensation in respect of land acquired by authorities possessing compulsory purchase powers; to amend section 28 of, and Schedule 2 to, the Finance Act 1931; and for purposes connected with the matters aforesaid.}} |- | {{|Consolidated Fund Act 1967|public|2|16-02-1967|An Act to apply a sum out of the Consolidated Fund to the service of the year ending on 31st March 1967.}} |- | {{|Education Act 1967|public|3|16-02-1967|maintained=y|An Act to enlarge the powers of the Secretary of State to make contributions, grants and loans in respect of aided schools and special agreement schools and to direct local education authorities to pay the expenses of establishing or enlarging controlled schools; and to provide for loans for capital expenditure incurred for purposes of colleges of education by persons other than local education authorities.}} |- | {{|West Indies Act 1967|public|4|16-02-1967|maintained=y|An Act to confer on certain West Indian territories a new status of association with the United Kingdom, and to enable that status to be terminated at any time; to make provision for other matters in connection with, or consequential upon, the creation or termination of that status or other constitutional changes which may occur in relation to any of those territories; to make further provision as to grants under the Overseas Aid Act 1966; and for purposes connected with the matters aforesaid.}} |- | {{|London Government Act 1967|public|5|16-02-1967|An Act to amend the provisions as to the election and retirement of councillors and aldermen of London borough councils and councillors of the Greater London Council; and for connected purposes.}} |- | {{|Consolidated Fund (No. 2) Act 1967|public|6|22-03-1967|An Act to apply certain sums out of the Consolidated Fund to the service of the years ending on 31st March 1966, 1967 and 1968.}} |- | {{|Misrepresentation Act 1967|public|7|22-03-1967|maintained=y|An Act to amend the law relating to innocent misrepresentations and to amend sections 11 and 35 of the Sale of Goods Act 1893.}} |- | {{|Plant Health Act 1967|public|8|22-03-1967|maintained=y|An Act to consolidate the Destructive Insects and Pests Acts 1877 to 1927, together with section 11 of the Agriculture (Miscellaneous Provisions) Act 1949.}} |- | {{|General Rate Act 1967|public|9|22-03-1967|maintained=y|An Act to consolidate certain enactments relating to rating and valuation in England and Wales.}} |- | {{|Forestry Act 1967|public|10|22-03-1967|maintained=y|An Act to consolidate the Forestry Acts 1919 to 1963 with corrections and improvements made under the Consolidation of Enactments (Procedure) Act 1949.}} |- | {{|Export Guarantees Act 1967|public|11|22-03-1967|An Act to raise the limits on the liabilities which may be undertaken by the Board of Trade in respect of guarantees under sections 1 and 2 of the Export Guarantees Act 1949 and certain other transactions under the Export Guarantees Acts 1949 to 1964.}} |- | {{|Teachers' Superannuation Act 1967|public|12|22-03-1967|An Act to consolidate the enactments relating to the superannuation of teachers and certain other persons employed in connection with the provision of educational services.}} |- | {{|Parliamentary Commissioner Act 1967|public|13|22-03-1967|maintained=y|An Act to make provision for the appointment and functions of a Parliamentary Commissioner for the investigation of administrative action taken on behalf of the Crown, and for purposes connected therewith.}} |- | {{|Licensing (Certificates in Suspense) (Scotland) Act 1967|public|14|22-03-1967|An Act to provide for the abolition of the suspension of certificates for the sale by retail of exciseable liquor, and for the amendment of the procedure for the removal of existing certificates which are in suspense to premises other than those specified in the certificate and for purposes connected with the matters aforesaid.}} |- | {{|Post Office (Borrowing Powers) Act 1967|public|15|22-03-1967|An Act to increase the limits imposed by section 10(2) of the Post Office Act 1961; to provide that nothing in section 10(1) of that Act shall prevent the operation of a giro system; and for connected purposes.}} |- | {{|Teachers of Nursing Act 1967|public|16|22-03-1967|An Act to amend section 17 of the Nurses Act 1957 and section 6(1)(f) of the Nurses (Scotland) Act 1951.}} |- | {{|Iron and Steel Act 1967|public|17|22-03-1967|An Act to provide for the establishment of a National Steel Corporation and the transfer thereto of the securities of certain companies engaged in the production of steel and, in connection therewith, to revive certain provisions of the Iron and Steel Act 1949 and continue others in force and to amend certain of the revived provisions; to make fresh provision for the control of the provision of iron and steel production facilities; to dissolve the Iron and Steel Board and amend the provisions of the Iron and Steel Act 1953 concerning the Iron and Steel Holding and Realisation Agency; and for purposes connected with the matters aforesaid.}} |- | {{|Local Government (Termination of Reviews) Act 1967|public|18|10-05-1967|An Act to dissolve the Local Government Commission for England and the Local Government Commission for Wales, to provide (with retrospective effect) for the discontinuance of reviews under Part II of the Local Government Act 1958 and to repeal section 30(6) and certain related provisions of the London Government Act 1963.}} |- | {{|Private Places of Entertainment (Licensing) Act 1967|public|19|10-05-1967|maintained=y|An Act to provide for the licensing of certain private places of entertainment.}} |- | {{|Housing (Financial Provisions, &c.) (Scotland) Act 1967|public|20|10-05-1967|An Act to make further provision for the giving of financial assistance towards the provision of houses in Scotland; to increase the amount of contributions payable in respect of hostels under section 89 of the Housing (Scotland) Act 1950; to replace certain provisions as to the withholding, reduction, suspension, postponement, discontinuing or transfer of certain contributions; to make further provision for the Scottish Special Housing Association; to make provision in certain cases for the discharge or modification by the sheriff of heritable securities, charges and agreements on or relating to an unfit house; to revive section 12(6) of the Rent Act 1957 in its application to Scotland; and for matters connected with the aforesaid purposes.}} |- | {{|Road Traffic Act 1967|public|21|10-05-1967|An Act to remove the time-limit of five years imposed by section 13(1) of the Road Traffic and Roads Improvement Act 1960.}} |- | {{|Agriculture Act 1967|public|22|10-05-1967|maintained=y|An Act to establish a Meat and Livestock Commission and make other provision for the livestock and livestock products industries, to amend the Agriculture (Calf Subsidies) Act 1952 and make new provision with respect to the supervision and enforcement of schemes under that Act, to authorise the payment of subsidies in respect of cows maintained for the purpose of breeding calves for beef, to authorise grants for improvements of agricultural land and in respect of expenditure on equipment, plant and machinery for use in agriculture, and on certain vehicles, and supplementary grants in respect of certain expenditure, and to make provision with respect to the shape and size of farms and related matters, agriculture and forestry on hill land, cooperative activities in agriculture, diseases of animals and other matters connected with agriculture.}} |- | {{|Royal Assent Act 1967|public|23|10-05-1967|maintained=y|An Act to amend the law relating to the signification of Her Majesty's Royal Assent.}} |- | {{|Slaughter of Poultry Act 1967|public|24|10-05-1967|maintained=y|An Act to provide for the humane slaughter, for certain commercial purposes, of poultry.}} |- | {{|National Insurance (Industrial Injuries) (Amendment) Act 1967|public|25|10-05-1967|An Act to amend the enactments providing for benefits out of the Industrial Injuries Fund in respect of industrial diseases; and for connected purposes.}} |- | {{|Merchant Shipping Act 1967|public|26|10-05-1967|An Act to amend section 92 of the Merchant Shipping Act 1894. (Note: Merchant Shipping Act 1894 (57 & 58 Vict. c. 60)) }} |- | {{|Merchant Shipping (Load Lines) Act 1967|public|27|10-05-1967|maintained=y|An Act to make further provision as to load lines and related matters; to increase penalties under certain provisions of the Merchant Shipping Acts 1894 to 1965 relating to passenger steamers; and for purposes connected with the matters aforesaid.}} |- | {{|Superannuation (Miscellaneous Provisions) Act 1967|public|28|10-05-1967|maintained=y|An Act to amend the law relating to pensions and other similar payments to or in respect of persons who have been in certain employment, and for connected purposes.}} |- | {{|Housing Subsidies Act 1967|public|29|10-05-1967|maintained=y|An Act to make provision with respect to financial assistance towards the provision, acquisition or improvement of dwellings and the provision of hostels; and for connected purposes.}} |- | {{|Road Safety Act 1967|public|30|10-05-1967|An Act to make further provision with respect to persons driving or being in charge of motor vehicles after consuming alcohol or taking drugs and with respect to goods vehicles and to empower constables to arrest persons suspected of driving or attempting to drive while disqualified.}} |- | {{|Commonwealth Settlement Act 1967|public|31|10-05-1967|An Act to extend the period for which the Secretary of State may make contributions under schemes agreed under section 1 of the Empire Settlement Act 1922.}} |- | {{|Development of Inventions Act 1967|public|32|10-05-1967|maintained=y|An Act to consolidate the Development of Inventions Act 1948, the Development of Inventions Act 1954 and the Development of Inventions Act 1965.}} |- | {{|Air Corporations Act 1967|public|33|10-05-1967|An Act to consolidate, with certain exceptions, the provisions of the Air Corporations Acts 1949 to 1966.}} |- | {{|Industrial Injuries and Diseases (Old Cases) Act 1967|public|34|12-06-1967|An Act to consolidate certain enactments relating to workmen's compensation or other benefit in respect of employment before 5th July 1948.}} |- | {{|Fishing Vessel Grants Act 1967|public|35|28-06-1967|An Act to repeal the statutory limits on the amount that may be paid by way of any grant in pursuance of a scheme under section 1 or 6 of the White Fish and Herring Industries Act 1953 in respect of expenditure consisting of payments made on or after 1st January 1967.}} |- | {{|Remuneration of Teachers (Scotland) Act 1967|public|36|28-06-1967|An Act to make new provision for determining the remuneration of teachers in Scotland; and for purposes connected therewith.}} |- | {{|Deer (Amendment) (Scotland) Act 1967|public|37|28-06-1967|maintained=y|An Act to amend sections 15 and 33 of the Deer (Scotland) Act 1959.}} |- | {{|Refreshment Houses Act 1967|public|38|28-06-1967|An Act to amend the Refreshment Houses Acts 1860 and 1964; and for purposes connected therewith.}} |- | {{|National Health Service (Family Planning) Act 1967|public|39|28-06-1967|An Act to secure the provision, as part of the National Health Service, by local health authorities of services in connection with family planning.}} |- | {{|Shipbuilding Industry Act 1967|public|40|28-06-1967|An Act to provide for the establishment of a public board with the function of promoting the ability of the shipbuilding industry in the United Kingdom to compete in world markets; to enable the board to give financial assistance to persons carrying on shipbuilding undertakings and marine engine manufacturing undertakings; to enable the Minister of Technology to give guarantees in connection with the construction of ships in shipyards situated in the United Kingdom and the equipment of ships constructed in such shipyards; and for connected purposes.}} |- | {{|Marine, &c., Broadcasting (Offences) Act 1967|public|41|14-07-1967|maintained=y|An Act to suppress broadcasting from ships, aircraft and certain marine structures.}} |- | {{|Advertisements (Hire-Purchase) Act 1967|public|42|14-07-1967|An Act to consolidate the enactments relating to the contents of advertisements displayed or issued in connection with hire-purchase or credit-sale.}} |- | {{|Legal Aid (Scotland) Act 1967|public|43|14-07-1967|An Act to consolidate certain enactments relating to legal aid and advice in Scotland and connected matters.}} |- | {{|Public Records Act 1967|public|44|14-07-1967|maintained=y|An Act to reduce the period of fifty years specified in section 5(1) of the Public Records Act 1958 as that for which certain public records must have been in existence for them to be available for public inspection.}} |- | {{|Uniform Laws on International Sales Act 1967|public|45|14-07-1967|maintained=y|An Act to give effect to two Conventions with respect to the international sale of goods; and for purposes connected therewith.}} |- | {{|Protection of Birds Act 1967|public|46|14-07-1967|maintained=y|An Act to amend the law relating to the protection of birds.}} |- | {{|Decimal Currency Act 1967|public|47|14-07-1967|An Act to provide for the introduction of a decimal currency in the year 1971; and to regulate the constitution and functions of the Decimal Currency Board.}} |- | {{|Industrial and Provident Societies Act 1967|public|48|14-07-1967|maintained=y|An Act to facilitate the borrowing of money by registered societies within the meaning of the Industrial and Provident Societies Act 1965; and for connected purposes.}} |- | {{|Llangollen International Musical Eisteddfod Act 1967|public|49|14-07-1967|maintained=y|An Act to make further provision for contributions by local authorities in Wales (including Monmouthshire) towards the expense of the Llangollen International Musical Eisteddfod.}} |- | {{|Farm and Garden Chemicals Act 1967|public|50|14-07-1967|maintained=y|An Act to make provision for the labelling of farm and garden chemicals, and matters related thereto.}} |- | {{|Licensing (Amendment) Act 1967|public|51|14-07-1967|maintained=y|An Act to amend Part VII of the Licensing Act 1964 in regard to the provision of off-licences in licensing planning areas.}} |- | {{|Tokyo Convention Act 1967|public|52|14-07-1967|maintained=y|An Act to make provision with a view to the ratification on behalf of the United Kingdom of the Convention on Offences and certain other Acts Committed on board Aircraft, signed in Tokyo on 14th September 1963, and to give effect to certain provisions relating to piracy of the Convention on the High Seas, signed in Geneva on 29th April 1958; and for purposes connected with the matters aforesaid.}} |- | {{|Prices and Incomes Act 1967|public|53|14-07-1967|An Act to make, in relation to prices and charges and in relation to terms and conditions of employment, further provision to supplement or amend the Prices and Incomes Act 1966.}} |- | {{|Finance Act 1967|public|54|21-07-1967|maintained=y|An Act to grant certain duties, to alter other duties, and to amend the law relating to the National Debt and the Public Revenue, and to make further provision in connection with Finance.}} |- | {{|Road Transport Lighting Act 1967|public|55|21-07-1967|An Act to resolve doubts as to the application of the Road Transport Lighting Act 1957 to reflecting material; to confer power on the Minister of Transport to require or authorise lights of prescribed colours to be shown to the rear of vehicles; and to restrict the carrying by vehicles of certain illuminated signalling devices.}} |- | {{|Matrimonial Causes Act 1967|public|56|21-07-1967|An Act to confer jurisdiction on county courts in certain matrimonial proceedings; and for purposes connected therewith.}} |- | {{|Control of Liquid Fuel Act 1967|public|57|21-07-1967|An Act to make temporary provision for controlling the supply, acquisition and consumption of liquid fuel and of lubricating oil and grease, and for purposes connected therewith.}} |- | {{|Criminal Law Act 1967|public|58|21-07-1967|maintained=y|An Act to amend the law of England and Wales by abolishing the division of crimes into felonies and misdemeanours and to amend and simplify the law in respect of matters arising from or related to that division or the abolition of it; to do away (within or without England and Wales) with certain obsolete crimes together with the torts of maintenance and champerty; and for purposes connected therewith.}} |- | {{|Appropriation Act 1967|public|59|27-07-1967|An Act to apply a sum out of the Consolidated Fund to the service of the year ending on 31st March 1968, and to appropriate the further supplies granted in this Session of Parliament.}} |- | {{|Sexual Offences Act 1967|public|60|27-07-1967|maintained=y|An Act to amend the law of England and Wales relating to homosexual acts.}} |- | {{|Public Works Loans Act 1967|public|61|27-07-1967|maintained=y|An Act to make further provision with respect to loans out of the Local Loans Fund.}} |- | {{|Post Office (Data Processing Service) Act 1967|public|62|27-07-1967|An Act to authorise the payment out of the Post Office Fund of the expenses of the Postmaster General in providing services and facilities for the processing of data by computer, and to impose an obligation of secrecy in connection with the provision by him of such services and facilities.}} |- | {{|Bermuda Constitution Act 1967|public|63|27-07-1967|maintained=y|An Act to provide for the grant of a new constitution for Bermuda.}} |- | {{|Anchors and Chain Cables Act 1967|public|64|27-07-1967|maintained=y|An Act to make new provision in substitution for the Anchors and Chain Cables Act 1899.}} |- | {{|Antarctic Treaty Act 1967|public|65|27-07-1967|maintained=y|An Act to enable effect to be given to measures for the conservation of Antarctic fauna and flora which, in pursuance of the Antarctic Treaty signed at Washington on 1st December 1959, have been or may hereafter be recommended for approval by contracting parties to that treaty; and for other purposes connected with the Antarctic Treaty.}} |- | {{|Welsh Language Act 1967|public|66|27-07-1967|maintained=y|An Act to make further provision with respect to the Welsh language and references in Acts of Parliament to Wales.}} |- | {{|Irish Sailors and Soldiers Land Trust Act 1967|public|67|27-07-1967|maintained=y|An Act to enable the Irish Sailors and Soldiers Land Trust to provide, or assist in the provision of, living accommodation other than cottages; and to extend the powers of the Trust to sell cottages to the widows of former tenants.}} |- | {{|Fugitive Offenders Act 1967|public|68|27-07-1967|An Act to make fresh provision for the return from the United Kingdom to other Commonwealth countries and United Kingdom dependencies of persons accused or convicted of offences in those countries and dependencies; to regulate the treatment of persons accused or convicted of offences in the United Kingdom who are returned from such countries and dependencies; to authorise the making of corresponding provisions for United Kingdom dependencies, including provisions for the return from such dependencies of persons accused or convicted in the Republic of Ireland; and for purposes connected with the matters aforesaid.}} |- | {{|Civic Amenities Act 1967|public|69|27-07-1967|maintained=y|An Act to make further provision for the protection and improvement of buildings of architectural or historic interest and of the character of areas of such interest; for the preservation and planting of trees; and for the orderly disposal of disused vehicles and equipment and other rubbish.}} |- | {{|Road Traffic (Amendment) Act 1967|public|70|27-07-1967|maintained=y|An Act to make provision for securing compliance with the requirements imposed by law as to the use of motor vehicles and trailers on roads and their construction, equipment, weight and condition, and for exempting persons convicted of offences against such requirements from the consequences of conviction, and to remove doubts about the extent of the power to make Orders under the Motor Vehicles (International Circulation) Act 1952.}} |- | {{|Aden, Perim and Kuria Muria Islands Act 1967|public|71|27-07-1967|maintained=y|An Act to make provision for, and in connection with, the relinquishment of Her Majesty's sovereignty over Aden, Perim and the Kuria Muria Islands, and to amend the definition of "Governor" in section 32(1) of the British Nationality Act 1948.}} |- | {{|Wireless Telegraphy Act 1967|public|72|27-07-1967|maintained=y|An Act to enable the Postmaster General to obtain information as to the sale and hire of television receiving sets; to enable him to prohibit the manufacture or importation of certain wireless telegraphy apparatus; to make provision for requiring applicants for vehicle excise licences to give information about such apparatus installed in vehicles; to make miscellaneous amendments in the Wireless Telegraphy Act 1949; and for connected purposes.}} |- | {{|National Insurance Act 1967|public|73|27-07-1967|An Act to amend the provisions of the National Insurance Act 1965, the National Insurance (Industrial Injuries) Act 1965 and the Industrial Injuries and Diseases (Old Cases) Act 1967 as to contributions, benefit and insurable employments; to provide for the set-off of certain overpayments; to confer temporary power to increase family allowances by order; and for connected purposes.}} |- | {{|Greenwich Hospital Act 1967|public|74|27-07-1967|maintained=y|An Act to amend the enactments relating to Greenwich Hospital in respect of the investment of capital money and the annual estimates of income and expenditure.}} |- | {{|Matrimonial Homes Act 1967|public|75|27-07-1967|An Act to amend the law of England and Wales as to the rights of a husband or wife to occupy a dwelling house which has been the matrimonial home; and for connected purposes.}} |- | {{|Road Traffic Regulation Act 1967|public|76|27-07-1967|maintained=y|An Act to consolidate certain enactments relating to road traffic, with corrections and minor improvements made under the Consolidation of Enactments (Procedure) Act 1949.}} |- | {{|Police (Scotland) Act 1967|public|77|27-07-1967|maintained=y|An Act to consolidate certain enactments relating to police forces in Scotland and to the execution of warrants in the border counties of England and Scotland and to repeal certain provisions relating to the police in Scotland which have ceased to have any effect.}} |- | {{|Water (Scotland) Act 1967|public|78|27-07-1967|maintained=y|An Act to provide for the establishment of regional water boards and a Central Scotland Water Development Board, and the transfer to those boards of functions in relation to water supply in Scotland previously exercisable by local water authorities, to confer on the Central Scotland Water Development Board functions in relation to the bulk supply of water to their constituent regional water boards, to enable other regional water boards and water development boards to be established by order of the Secretary of State, to amend the Water (Scotland) Acts 1946 and 1949; and for purposes connected with the matters aforesaid.}} |- | {{|Road Traffic (Driving Instruction) Act 1967|public|79|27-07-1967|An Act to provide for the registration of persons engaged in giving instruction in the driving of motor vehicles and for connected purposes.}} |- | {{|Criminal Justice Act 1967|public|80|27-07-1967|maintained=y|An Act to amend the law relating to the proceedings of criminal courts, including the law relating to evidence, and to the qualification of jurors, in such proceedings and to appeals in criminal cases; to reform existing methods and provide new methods of dealing with offenders; to make further provision for the treatment of offenders, the management of prisons and other institutions and the arrest of offenders unlawfully at large; to make further provision with respect to legal aid and advice in criminal proceedings; to amend the law relating to firearms and ammunition; to alter the penalties which may be imposed for certain offences; and for connected purposes.}} |- | {{|Companies Act 1967|public|81|27-07-1967|maintained=y|An Act to amend the law relating to companies, insurance, partnerships and moneylenders.}} |- | {{|Dangerous Drugs Act 1967|public|82|27-10-1967|An Act to provide for the control of drug addiction and to make further provision with respect to drugs.}} |- | {{|Sea Fisheries (Shellfish) Act 1967|public|83|27-10-1967|maintained=y|An Act to consolidate certain enactments relating to shellfish fisheries and shellfish, with amendments to give effect to recommendations of the Law Commission and the Scottish Law Commission.}} |- | {{|Sea Fish (Conservation) Act 1967|public|84|27-10-1967|maintained=y|An Act to consolidate (with corrections and improvements made under the Consolidation of Enactments (Procedure) Act 1949) certain enactments which provide for regulating the commercial use of, fishing for, and landing of, sea fish, and for authorising measures for the increase or improvement of marine resources.}} |- | {{|Vessels Protection Act 1967|public|85|27-10-1967|An Act to make it an offence to take away a vessel without authority or to use or be a party to the use of a vessel so taken; and for purposes connected therewith.}} |- | {{|Countryside (Scotland) Act 1967|public|86|27-10-1967|maintained=y|An Act to make provision for the better enjoyment of the Scottish countryside, for the establishment of a Countryside Commission for Scotland and for the improvement of recreational and other facilities; to extend the powers of local planning authorities as respects land in their districts; to make financial provision with respect to the matters aforesaid; and for connected purposes.}} |- | {{|Abortion Act 1967|public|87|27-10-1967|maintained=y|An Act to amend and clarify the law relating to termination of pregnancy by registered medical practitioners.}} |- | {{|Leasehold Reform Act 1967|public|88|27-10-1967|maintained=y|An Act to enable tenants of houses held on long leases at low rents to acquire the freehold or an extended lease; to apply the Rent Acts to premises held on long leases at a rackrent, and to bring the operation of the Landlord and Tenant Act 1954 into conformity with the Rent Acts as so amended; to make other changes in the law in relation to premises held on long leases, including amendments of the Places of Worship (Enfranchisement) Act 1920; and for purposes connected therewith.}} }}

== Local Acts ==
{{legislationuk|act |- | {{|Glasgow Corporation (Carnoustie Street) Bridge Order Confirmation Act 1966|local|2|26-05-1966|An Act to confirm a Provisional Order under the Private Legislation Procedure (Scotland) Act 1936, relating to Glasgow Corporation (Carnoustie Street) Bridge.|po1=Glasgow Corporation (Carnoustie Street) Bridge Order 1966|Provisional Order to authorise the Corporation of the city of Glasgow to acquire lands and construct a bridge over the river Clyde in the vicinity of Carnoustie Street in the said city together with approaches thereto; to borrow money and for other purposes.}} |- | {{|Ministry of Housing and Local Government Provisional Orders Confirmation (Cambridge, Reading and Walsall) Act 1966|local|3|03-08-1966|An Act to confirm Provisional Orders of the Minister of Housing and Local Government relating to the City of Cambridge and the county boroughs of Reading and Walsall.|po1=City of Cambridge Order 1966|Provisional Order amending a Local Act and a Confirming Act.|po2=Reading Order 1966|Provisional Order amending a Local Act.|po3=Walsall Order 1966|Provisional Order altering a Local Act.}} |- | {{|Ministry of Housing and Local Government Provisional Order Confirmation (West Kent Main Sewerage District) Act 1966|local|4|03-08-1966|An Act to confirm a Provisional Order of the Minister of Housing and Local Government relating to the West Kent Main Sewerage District.|po1=West Kent Main Sewerage Order 1966|Provisional Order amending certain Local Acts and Confirming Acts.}} |- | {{|Welsh Office Provisional Order Confirmation (Western Valleys (Monmouthshire) Sewerage Board) Act 1966|local|5|03-08-1966|An Act to confirm a Provisional Order of the Secretary of State relating to the Western Valleys (Monmouthshire) Sewerage Board.|po1=Western Valleys (Monmouthshire) Sewerage Board Order 1966|Provisional Order amending Local Acts.}} |- | {{|Kent Quarter Sessions Act 1966|local|6|03-08-1966|An Act to make provision as to deputy chairmen of the court of quarter sessions for the county of Kent; and for purposes incidental thereto.}} |- | {{|Bradford Cathedral and Churchyard Act 1966|local|7|03-08-1966|An Act to vest in the Chapter of the Cathedral Church of Saint Peter Bradford the said Cathedral and the churchyard of that Cathedral; to provide for the removal of certain restrictions attaching to the said churchyard; to authorise the use of the said churchyard for building and other purposes and the disposal thereof; and for other purposes.}} |- | {{|Loughborough University of Technology Act 1966|local|8|03-08-1966|An Act to dissolve the Loughborough College of Technology and to transfer all the rights, property and liabilities of that college to the Loughborough University of Technology; to provide for the pooling of investments and moneys of certain endowment funds of the Loughborough University of Technology; and for other purposes.}} |- | {{|University of Surrey Act 1966|local|9|03-08-1966|An Act to dissolve Battersea College of Technology and to transfer all the rights, property and liabilities of that college to the University of Surrey; to provide for the pooling of investments and moneys of certain endowment funds of the University of Surrey; and for other purposes.}} |- | {{|Royal Albert Hall Act 1966|local|10|03-08-1966|An Act to make better provision for the improvement, repair, maintenance and equipment of the Royal Albert Hall; to provide additional funds for the Corporation of the Hall of Arts and Sciences and to extend the powers of that Corporation as to the application of their existing funds; to amend and extend the existing provisions as to seat rates and seatholders and the use and letting of the hall; and for other purposes.}} |- | {{|Mersey Docks and Harbour Board Act 1966|local|11|03-08-1966|An Act to authorise the Mersey Docks and Harbour Board to construct further works; and for other purposes.}} |- | {{|Scottish Union and National Insurance Company's Act 1966|local|12|03-08-1966|An Act to confer powers upon the Scottish Union and National Insurance Company with respect to the distribution of capital profits and to empower the Norwich Union Fire Insurance Society Limited to acquire compulsorily shares in the said Company; and for other purposes.}} |- | {{|British Waterways Act 1966|local|13|03-08-1966|An Act to relieve the British Waterways Board from their obligation to maintain certain waterways for navigation and to extinguish rights of navigation thereon; and for other purposes.}} |- | {{|Huyton-with-Roby Urban District Council Act 1966|local|14|03-08-1966|An Act to empower the urban district council of Huyton-with-Roby to lease certain land; to provide for the development and use of that land and the extinguishment of public rights in, upon or over the same; and for other purposes.}} |- | {{|Exeter Corporation Act 1966|local|15|03-08-1966|An Act to confer further powers on the mayor, aldermen and citizens of the city of Exeter; to make further provision with regard to the health, local government and finances of the city; and for other purposes.}} |- | {{|Barry Corporation Act 1966|local|16|03-08-1966|An Act to confer further powers on the mayor, aldermen and burgesses of the borough of Barry; to make further provision with respect to the health, local government, improvement and finances of the borough; and for other purposes.}} |- | {{|British Railways Act 1966|local|17|03-08-1966|An Act to empower the British Railways Board to construct works and to acquire lands; to extend the time for the compulsory purchase of certain lands and the completion of certain works; to confer further powers on the Board; and for other purposes.}} |- | {{|Derby Churches (Saint Christopher's, Saint Peter's and Saint Paul's) Act 1966|local|18|03-08-1966|An Act to provide for the demolition or disposal of the church of Saint Christopher, Derby, and of the church hall of the church of Saint Peter, Derby, to authorise the sale and use of the sites thereof and of lands appurtenant thereto for other purposes; to authorise the use of the churchyard of the church of Saint Paul, Derby, for other purposes; and for purposes incidental thereto.}} |- | {{|Ministry of Housing and Local Government Provisional Order Confirmation (City of Oxford) Act 1966|local|19|09-08-1966|An Act to confirm a Provisional Order of the Minister of Housing and Local Government relating to the City of Oxford.|po1=City of Oxford Order 1966|Provisional Order amending Local Acts.}} |- | {{|Oldham Corporation Act 1966|local|20|09-08-1966|An Act to authorise the mayor, aldermen and burgesses of the county borough of Oldham to make street improvements, to purchase land compulsorily therefor, to confer powers upon them with reference to the supply of hot water and of heat; and for other purposes.}} |- | {{|Saint Mary, Ealing Act 1966|local|21|09-08-1966|An Act to free part of the burial ground appurtenant to the church of Saint Mary, Ealing from the restrictions attaching to it as a disused burial ground; to authorise the use thereof for other purposes; and for purposes incidental thereto.}} |- | {{|Greater London Council (Money) Act 1966|local|22|09-08-1966|An Act to regulate the expenditure on capital account and on lending to other persons by the Greater London Council during the financial period from 1st April 1966 to 30th September 1967; and for other purposes.}} |- | {{|Mersey Docks and Harbour Board (Seaforth Works) Act 1966|local|23|09-08-1966|An Act to authorise the Mersey Docks and Harbour Board to construct further works; and for other purposes.}} |- | {{|Blackfriars Bridgehead Improvements Act 1966|local|24|09-08-1966|An Act to authorise the Corporation of London to extend the river wall and street works authorised by the Blackfriars Bridgehead Improvements Act 1960 and to acquire lands compulsorily; and for other purposes.}} |- | {{|Tees and Hartlepools Port Authority Act 1966|local|25|09-08-1966|maintained=y|An Act to incorporate the Tees and Hartlepools Port Authority; to transfer to that Authority the undertakings of the Tees Conservancy Commissioners and the Hartlepool Port and Harbour Commissioners, the harbour and dock works of the British Transport Docks Board at the Hartlepools and Middlesbrough, the quay undertaking of the mayor, aldermen and burgesses of the borough of Stockton-on-Tees and the Middlesbrough wharf undertaking of the Tyne-Tees Steam Shipping Company Limited; to confer powers on that Authority; and for other purposes.}} |- | {{|Yorkshire Registries Amendment Act 1966|local|26|09-08-1966|An Act to amend the law relating to the registration of deeds and other matters affecting lands and hereditaments within the three ridings of the county of York; to confer further powers upon the county councils of the said ridings; and for other purposes.}} |- | {{|Manchester Ship Canal Act 1966|local|27|09-08-1966|An Act to provide for the abandonment of certain works of the Manchester Ship Canal Company; to confer further powers upon the Company; and for other purposes.}} |- | {{|Greater London Council (General Powers) Act 1966|local|28|09-08-1966|An Act to empower the City of London and Tower Hamlets Cemetery Company to sell to the Greater London Council the lands known as the City of London and Tower Hamlets Cemetery; to confer further powers upon the Greater London Council and other authorities; and for other purposes.}} |- | {{|United Kingdom Oil Pipelines Act 1966|local|29|09-08-1966|An Act to empower United Kingdom Oil Pipelines Limited to acquire lands; and for other purposes.}} |- | {{|Leeds Corporation Act 1966|local|30|09-08-1966|An Act to confer further powers on the lord mayor, aldermen and citizens of the city of Leeds in relation to lands and buildings, and to make further provision for the improvement, health, local government and finances of the city; and for other purposes.}} |- | {{|British Transport Docks Act 1966|local|31|09-08-1966|An Act to empower the British Transport Docks Board to construct works and to acquire lands; to confer further powers on the Board; and for other purposes.}} |- | {{|Thames Conservancy Act 1966|local|32|09-08-1966|maintained=y|An Act to amend the Thames Conservancy Acts, 1932 to 1959; to make further provision in regard to the registration of pleasure boats using the river Thames and the registration charges and lock tolls payable in respect thereof; to extend the powers of the Conservators of the river Thames; and for other purposes.}} |- | {{|London Transport Act 1966|local|33|09-08-1966|An Act to empower the London Transport Board to construct works and to acquire lands, to extend the time for the compulsory purchase of certain lands, to confer further powers on the Board; and for other purposes.}} |- | {{|Pier and Harbour Orders (Blackpool Pier and Great Yarmouth New Britannia Pier) Confirmation Act 1966|local|34|12-08-1966|An Act to confirm certain Provisional Orders made by the Minister of Transport under the General Pier and Harbour Act 1861 relating to Blackpool Pier and Great Yarmouth New Britannia Pier.|po1=Blackpool Pier Order 1966|Provisional Order to provide for the vesting in the Blackpool Pier Company Limited of the undertaking of the Blackpool Pier Company; to confer further powers on the first-named Company with reference to Blackpool North Pier; to repeal and amend certain enactments relating thereto; and for other purposes.|po2=Great Yarmouth New Britannia Pier Order 1966|Provisional Order to provide for the vesting in the Great Yarmouth New Britannia Pier Company Limited of the undertaking of the Great Yarmouth New Britannia Pier Company; to confer further powers on the first-named Company with reference to the Great Yarmouth New Britannia Pier; to repeal and amend certain enactments relating thereto; and for other purposes.}} |- | {{|Whitley Bay Pier Act 1966|local|35|12-08-1966|An Act to empower North Eastern Piers Limited to construct works and to acquire lands; and for other purposes.}} |- | {{|Liverpool Corporation Act 1966|local|36|13-12-1966|An Act to authorise the lord mayor, aldermen and citizens of the city of Liverpool to construct street works and other works; to acquire lands for those and other purposes; to confer further powers on the said lord mayor, aldermen and citizens; and for other purposes.}} |- | {{|Brighton Corporation Act 1966|local|37|13-12-1966|An Act to confer further powers on the mayor, aldermen and burgesses of the county borough of Brighton; to make further provision with respect to the local government, improvement and finances of that borough; and for other purposes.}} |- | {{|Hove Corporation Act 1966|local|38|13-12-1966|An Act to provide for the removal of restrictions attaching to the churchyard of the Church of Saint Andrew in the borough of Hove and the development and disposition thereof, to make further provision with reference to the local government and improvement of the borough; and for other purposes.}} |- | {{|Ross and Cromarty (Strathcarron–South Strome Road) Order Confirmation Act 1966|local|39|21-12-1966|An Act to confirm a Provisional Order under the Private Legislation Procedure (Scotland) Act 1936, relating to Ross and Cromarty (Strathcarron-South Strome Road).|po1=Ross and Cromarty (Strathcarron–South Strome Road) Order 1966|Provisional Order to provide for the construction and maintenance of a new road from Strathcarron to South Strome in the County of Ross and Cromarty and relative works; and for other purposes.}} |- | {{|Liverpool Corporation (General Powers) Act 1966|local|40|21-12-1966|An Act to confer further powers on the lord mayor, aldermen and citizens of the city of Liverpool in relation to industry and lands; to empower them to establish an undertaking for the supply of heat; to make further provision for the improvement, health, local government and finances of the city; and for other purposes.}} |- | {{|Lee Valley Regional Park Act 1966|local|41|21-12-1966|An Act to establish the Lee Valley Regional Park Authority for the development, preservation and management for recreation, sport, entertainment and the enjoyment of leisure of an area adjoining the river Lee as a regional park; to confer further powers upon the said authority and certain other authorities, bodies and persons; to enact provisions in connection with the matters aforesaid; and for other purposes.}} |- | {{|London Bridge Act 1967|local|1|16-02-1967|An Act to empower the Corporation of London to reconstruct London Bridge, to construct other works and to acquire lands compulsorily; and for other purposes.}} |- | {{|Glasgow Corporation Order Confirmation Act 1967|local|2|22-03-1967|An Act to confirm a Provisional Order under the Private Legislation Procedure (Scotland) Act 1936, relating to Glasgow Corporation.|po1=Glasgow Corporation Order 1967|Provisional Order to confer powers on the Corporation of the city of Glasgow with respect to the feuing of their Ardgoil Estate; to make further provision for facilitating the protection and maintenance of their tunnels under the river Clyde between Linthouse and Whiteinch; to authorise the Corporation to make byelaws for regulating the use of the Glasgow Airport at Abbotsinch in the county of Renfrew; and for other purposes.}} |- | {{|Greenock Corporation Order Confirmation Act 1967|local|3|22-03-1967|An Act to confirm a Provisional Order under the Private Legislation Procedure (Scotland) Act 1936, relating to Greenock Corporation.|po1=Greenock Corporation Order 1967|Provisional Order to confer powers on the Corporation of Greenock with respect to lands held for parks and for other purposes.}} |- | {{|Tees Valley and Cleveland Water Act 1967|local|4|22-03-1967|An Act to authorise the Tees Valley and Cleveland Water Board to construct works and to acquire lands; and for other purposes.}} |- | {{|Edinburgh Corporation Order Confirmation Act 1967|local|5|10-05-1967|An Act to confirm a Provisional Order under the Private Legislation Procedure (Scotland) Act 1936, relating to Edinburgh Corporation.|po1=Edinburgh Corporation Order 1967|Provisional Order to consolidate with amendments the Acts and Orders relating to the Corporation of the city of Edinburgh (other than the Acts and Orders of the Corporation relating to their water undertaking) and to confer further powers on them with respect to their various undertakings and services and to the municipal government and administration of the city; to consolidate with amendments the provisions of the Edinburgh Corporation Order 1964 relative to the Edinburgh Sheriff Court House Commissioners; and for other purposes.}} |- | {{|Mersey Docks and Harbour Board Act 1967|local|6|10-05-1967|An Act to amend and extend the financial provisions relating to the Mersey Docks and Harbour Board; and for other purposes.}} |- | {{|Saint Mary-le-Park, Battersea Act 1967|local|7|10-05-1967|An Act to provide for the demolition of the church of Saint Mary-le-Park, Battersea, and of the church hall adjacent thereto; to provide for the erection of a new church and other buildings on part of the site of the existing church and church hall; to authorise the use for other purposes of other parts of the said site; and for purposes incidental thereto.}} |- | {{|Bath University of Technology Act 1967|local|8|10-05-1967|An Act to dissolve the Bristol College of Science and Technology and to transfer all rights, property and liabilities of that college to the Bath University of Technology; to provide for the pooling of investments and moneys of certain endowment funds of the Bath University of Technology; and for other purposes.}} |- | {{|Newcastle-under-Lyme Burgesses' Lands Act 1967|local|9|10-05-1967|An Act to confer further powers upon the Trustees of the Newcastle-under-Lyme Burgesses' Lands; to amend the Newcastle-under-Lyme Burgesses' Lands Act, 1859; and for other purposes.}} |- | {{|East Kilbride Burgh Act 1967|local|10|10-05-1967|An Act to make provision for the constitution of the burgh of East Kilbride in the County of Lanark into a large burgh and for other purposes.}} |- | {{|Saint Barnabas, Lewisham, Act 1967|local|11|28-06-1967|An Act to provide for the disposition of the church of Saint Barnabas, Lewisham, and the use for other purposes thereof; and for purposes incidental thereto.}} |- | {{|Wallasey Corporation Act 1967|local|12|28-06-1967|An Act to authorise the mayor, aldermen and burgesses of the borough of Wallasey to abandon and remove the New Brighton Promenade Pier in the county borough of Wallasey; to make further provision for the collection and recovery of the water rates of the Wirral Water Board; and for other purposes.}} |- | {{|Greater London Council (Money) Act 1967|local|13|28-06-1967|An Act to regulate the expenditure on capital account and on lending to other persons by the Greater London Council during the financial period from 1st April 1967 to 30th September 1968; and for other purposes.}} |- | {{|Saint Stephen, South Lambeth Act 1967|local|14|28-06-1967|An Act to provide for the demolition of the church of Saint Stephen, South Lambeth and for the erection of a new church and other buildings; to authorise the use for other purposes of part of the site of the present church; and for purposes incidental thereto.}} |- | {{|Churches and Universities (Scotland) Widows' and Orphans' Fund (Amendment) Order Confirmation Act 1967|local|15|14-07-1967|An Act to confirm a Provisional Order under the Private Legislation Procedure (Scotland) Act 1936, relating to the Churches and Universities (Scotland) Widows' and Orphans' Fund (Amendment).|po1=Churches and Universities (Scotland) Widows' and Orphans' Fund (Amendment) Order 1967|Provisional Order to amend the provisions of the Churches and Universities (Scotland) Widows' and Orphans' Fund Order, 1954, in their application to certain professors and for other purposes.}} |- | {{|Pittenweem Harbour Order Confirmation Act 1967|local|16|14-07-1967|An Act to confirm a Provisional Order under the Private Legislation Procedure (Scotland) Act 1936, relating to Pittenweem Harbour.|po1=Pittenweem Harbour Order 1967|Provisional Order to authorise the provost, magistrates and town councillors of the Royal Burgh of Pittenweem to carry out works for the improvement of the harbour of Pittenweem and to borrow money; and for other purposes.}} |- | {{|Royal Bank of Scotland Order Confirmation Act 1967|local|17|14-07-1967|An Act to confirm a Provisional Order under the Private Legislation Procedure (Scotland) Act 1936, relating to the Royal Bank of Scotland.|po1=Royal Bank of Scotland Order 1967|Provisional Order to authorise the Royal Bank of Scotland to appoint executive directors, to amend the Royal Charters and Acts of Parliament relating to the Bank; and for other purposes.}} |- | {{|St. Andrews Links Order Confirmation Act 1967|local|18|14-07-1967|An Act to confirm a Provisional Order under the Private Legislation Procedure (Scotland) Act 1936, relating to St. Andrews Links.|po1=St. Andrews Links Order 1967|Provisional Order to amend the provisions of the St. Andrews Links Order, 1932, relative to the powers to close the golf courses on special occasions and to make charges for admission to the said courses and for other purposes.}} |- | {{|Brunel University Act 1967|local|19|14-07-1967|An Act to dissolve the Brunel College of Advanced Technology; to transfer all the rights, property and liabilities of that college to the Brunel University; and for other purposes.}} |- | {{|Greater London Council (General Powers) Act 1967|local|20|14-07-1967|An Act to confer further powers upon the Greater London Council and other authorities; and for other purposes.}} |- | {{|The City University Act 1967|local|21|14-07-1967|An Act to dissolve the Northampton College of Advanced Technology, London, and to transfer all the rights, property and liabilities of that college to The City University; to provide for the pooling of investments and moneys of certain endowment funds of The City University; and for other purposes.}} |- | {{|University of Aston in Birmingham Act 1967|local|22|14-07-1967|An Act to dissolve the College of Advanced Technology, Birmingham and to transfer all the rights, property and liabilities of that college to the University of Aston in Birmingham; to provide for the pooling of investments and moneys of certain endowment funds of the University; and for other purposes.}} |- | {{|Ministry of Housing and Local Government Provisional Orders Confirmation (Buxton, Stockport and York) Act 1967|local|23|21-07-1967|An Act to confirm Provisional Orders of the Minister of Housing and Local Government relating to the borough of Buxton, the county borough of Stockport and the city of York.|po1=Buxton Order 1967|Provisional Order amending a Local Act.|po2=Stockport Order 1967|Provisional Order amending a Local Act and a Confirming Act.|po3=York Order 1967|Provisional Order altering a Local Act and Confirming Acts.}} |- | {{|Ministry of Housing and Local Government Provisional Order Confirmation (West Hertfordshire Main Drainage District) Act 1967|local|24|21-07-1967|An Act to confirm a Provisional Order of the Minister of Housing and Local Government relating to the West Hertfordshire Main Drainage District.|po1=West Hertfordshire Main Drainage Order 1967|Provisional Order amending a Local Act.}} |- | {{|Metropolitan Water Board Act 1967|local|25|21-07-1967|An Act to empower the Metropolitan Water Board to construct works and to acquire lands; and for other purposes.}} |- | {{|University of Bradford Act 1967|local|26|21-07-1967|An Act to dissolve the Bradford Institute of Technology and to transfer all rights, property and liabilities of that institute to The University of Bradford; to provide for the pooling of investments and moneys of certain endowment funds of The University of Bradford; and for other purposes.}} |- | {{|Newquay Urban District Council 1967|local|27|21-07-1967|An Act to confer further powers on the urban district council of Newquay, to make further provision for the improvement, health, local government and finances of the district; and for other purposes.}} |- | {{|Guildford Corporation Act 1967|local|28|21-07-1967|An Act to confer further powers upon the mayor, aldermen and burgesses of the borough of Guildford; to make further provision with respect to the health, local government and improvement of the borough; to provide for the transfer of the Godalming Navigation to the National Trust for Places of Historic Interest or Natural Beauty; and for other purposes.}} |- | {{|Ministry of Housing and Local Government Provisional Order Confirmation (Greater London Parks and Open Spaces) Act 1967|local|29|27-07-1967|maintained=y|An Act to confirm a Provisional Order of the Minister of Housing and Local Government relating to Greater London parks and open spaces.|po1=Greater London Parks and Open Spaces Order 1967|Provisional Order for securing uniformity in the law applicable with respect to Parks and Open Spaces.}} |- | {{|British Railways Act 1967|local|30|27-07-1967|An Act to empower the British Railways Board to construct works and to acquire lands; to extend the time for the completion of certain works; to confer further powers on the Board, the Fishguard and Rosslare Railways and Harbours Company and British Rail Hovercraft Limited; and for other purposes.}} |- | {{|British Transport Docks Act 1967|local|31|27-07-1967|An Act to empower the British Transport Docks Board to construct works and to acquire lands; to confer further powers on the Board; and for other purposes.}} |- | {{|Port of London Act 1967|local|32|27-07-1967|An Act to amend the Port of London Acts, 1920 to 1965; and for other purposes.}} |- | {{|Kingston upon Hull Corporation Act 1967|local|33|27-07-1967|An Act to empower the lord mayor, aldermen and citizens of the city and county of Kingston upon Hull to construct bridges across the river Hull and other works in the city; to make further provision in reference to lands and the improvement, health, local government and finances of the city; and for other purposes.}} |- | {{|Rhymney Valley Sewerage Board Act 1967|local|34|27-07-1967|An Act to confer further powers upon the Rhymney Valley Sewerage Board; to amend the provisions of the local enactments relating to the Board's undertaking; and for other purposes.}} |- | {{|Somerset County Council Act 1967|local|35|27-07-1967|An Act to confer further powers on the Somerset County Council and on local, highway and other authorities in the administrative county of Somerset in relation to lands and highways and the local government, improvement, health and finances of the county; and for other purposes.}} |- | {{|Portsmouth Corporation Act 1967|local|36|27-07-1967|An Act to confer further powers on the lord mayor, aldermen and citizens of the city of Portsmouth in relation to lands, buildings and streets, and to make further provision for the improvement, health, local government and finances of the city; and for other purposes.}} |- | {{|Dartford Tunnel Act 1967|local|37|27-07-1967|An Act to authorise the construction of a further tunnel under the river Thames between West Thurrock in the county of Essex and Dartford in the county of Kent with approaches thereto; to consolidate with amendments the Dartford Tunnel Acts, 1930 to 1962; to confer further powers in connection with the works authorised by those Acts and the new works; and for other purposes.}} |- | {{|Essex County Council (Canvey Island Approaches, etc.) Act 1967|local|38|27-07-1967|An Act to empower the county council of Essex to construct a new approach road to Canvey Island, including a bridge across East Haven Creek, and a diversion of the existing approach road to Canvey Island, including a bridge across Benfleet Creek, and to purchase lands compulsorily for those and other purposes; to provide for the removal of the existing bridge across Benfleet Creek; to confer further powers on the said county council and on local authorities in the county of Essex in relation to highways and the local government, improvement and health of the county; and for other purposes.}} |- | {{|London Transport Act 1967|local|39|27-07-1967|An Act to empower the London Transport Board to construct works and to acquire lands; to extend the time for the compulsory purchase of certain lands; to confer further powers on the Board; and for other purposes.}} |- | {{|Manchester Corporation Act 1967|local|40|27-07-1967|An Act to confer further powers on the lord mayor, aldermen and citizens of the city of Manchester in relation to lands, water, highways, public health, local government, finance and pensions; and for other purposes.}} }}
