= Development plan =

UK local land use planning

The East Cambridgeshire Local Plan was produced by the local authority and adopted in 2015.

A development plan sets out a local authority's policies and proposals for land use in their area. The term is usually used in the United Kingdom. A local plan is one type of development plan. The development plan guides and shapes day-to-day decisions as to whether or not planning permission should be granted, under the system known as development control (development management in Scotland). In order to ensure that these decisions are rational and consistent, they must be considered against the development plan adopted by the authority, after public consultation and having proper regard for other material factors.

Section 38(6) of the Planning and Compulsory Purchase Act 2004 (replacing Section 25 of Town and Country Planning (Scotland) Act 1997 and Section 54A of the Town and Country Planning Act 1990) requires that decisions made should be in accordance with the development plan unless material considerations indicate otherwise. Although development plans do not have to be rigidly adhered to, they provide a firm basis for rational and consistent planning decisions.

== History ==
Local plans and structure plans were introduced by the Town and Country Planning Act 1990. By virtue of specific transitional provisions, these plans will continue to operate for a time after the commencement of the new development plan system brought about by the Planning and Compulsory Purchase Act 2004.

== Outside the UK ==
In India, Development Plan process is a provincial/state subject. There are various town planning authorities under each province/state that assess the growth of areas, identify suitable areas for housing, industry, public infrastructure and allocate budgets. Each of the metropolitan cities in India has an Agency which is responsible for Development Planning exercise of the cities. Mumbai city has Mumbai Metropolitan Region Development Authority commonly known as MMRDA. Similarly there is Delhi Development Authority for Delhi, Bangalore has the Bengaluru Development Authority, Kolkata has Kolkata Metropolitan Development Authority and there is Chennai Metropolitan Development Authority for the south Indian city of Chennai.

Countries in the Middle East have started to launch national development plans where they draw up plans for diversifying their economies. See for example the Saudi Vision 2030, Qatar National Vision 2030, UAE Vision 2021 and Kuwait Vision 2035.

== Context ==
In England and Wales, the development plan may contain a number of documents: Counties and most non-metropolitan unitary districts are covered by structure plans (in which the county, national park or unitary authority set out key strategic policies as a framework for local planning) and local plans (in which district councils and national park authorities set out more detailed policies to guide development in their areas, including proposals for specific sites). Structure plans were in some cases prepared on a joint basis between two or more authorities (such as a county and a unitary authority or a national park).

County, national park and some unitary authorities also prepare minerals and waste local plans, which are also deemed to be local plans.

In London and the metropolitan areas, and in a few non-metropolitan unitary areas, authorities produce unitary development plans (UDPs), which combine the functions of structure and local plans and include minerals and waste policies.

Local plans and UDPs identify particular areas as suitable for housing, industry, retail or other uses, and set out the policies which the authority proposes to apply in deciding whether or not development will be permitted. The preparation of Local Plans and UDPs gives the community the opportunity to influence the detailed policies and specific proposals for the future development and use of land in their area. Because the plan forms the statutory basis for planning decisions, local people are involved in its preparation.

In Scotland, following the passing of the Planning etc. (Scotland) Act 2006, the development plan comprises strategic development plans (covering a number of city areas/urban authorities), local development plans and statutory Supplementary Guidance. National park authorities in Scotland also act a planning authority for the development of planning policy, and the Loch Lomond and the Trossachs and the Cairngorms National Park Local Plans also form part of the wider development plan.

== Current practice ==
The Planning and Compulsory Purchase Act 2004 has introduced a local development framework including several additional documents that will eventually supersede those mentioned above.

The procedure for adoption of a local plan includes issues and options, the draft local plan (followed by regulation 18 consultation), the publication local plan (followed by regulation 19 consultation), then examination by the Planning Inspectorate, modifications if necessary, and Adoption.

== See also ==
- City-building game – Video game genre
- Comprehensive planning – Long-term large-area public policy developmental plan
- Local development framework
- Official community plan, similar process in Canada
