= Planning gain =

Planning gains (or planning obligations) are ways that local authorities in the United Kingdom can secure additional public benefits from developers, during the granting of planning permission.

Planning gains seek to capture some of the uplift in land value which is generated by the granting of planning permission, and can be used to ensure that commercially viable development is not socially or environmentally unsustainable. They are used to fund the provision of public goods, including affordable housing, community infrastructure (such as libraries or parks), or environmental safeguards.

In England and Wales, such arrangements are negotiated between the developer and the local planning authority (LPA), and take place under the terms of Section 106 of the Town and Country Planning Act 1990. In Scotland the equivalent is a Section 75 planning obligation (Section 75 of the Town and Country Planning (Scotland) Act 1997).

== The Community Infrastructure Levy (CIL) ==
In addition to negotiations which take place under Section 106, in 2010 the UK Government introduced a new standard method for securing generalised contributions from developers in England and Wales, known as the Community Infrastructure Levy (CIL).

The Government announced the proposals in October 2008 and legislated for CIL in the 2008 Planning Act. CIL came into force in England and Wales on 6 April 2010.

On 2010 the UK Coalition Government proposed a number of reforms to CIL. The reforms included a number of selected changes to the primary legislation implementing CIL (the Planning Act 2008) through the vehicle of the Localism Bill, introduced into the UK Parliament in December 2010. The key changes proposed relate to a requirement to be placed on CIL charging authorities to pass money to other bodies (the stated policy intention being to pass money to neighbourhood groups), a clarification of the purposes to which monies raised may be put, and a reduction in the powers of the independent person appointed by the charging authority to advise on whether the proposed charges are appropriate. The Bill received Royal Assent as the Localism Act in November 2011.

A number of the smaller changes proposed by the new Government were implemented in a set of amending Regulations brought into force in April 2011. Consultation on the detail of the more significant proposals followed once the Localism Act had been passed and a further set of amending Regulations completed the changes.

Newark and Sherwood District Council, which was the first in England to publish a preliminary draft charging schedule, in November 2010. Others followed, and in late 2011 LB Southwark prepared a CIL known as the Elephant and Castle Section 106 Tariff. On 1 January 2012 the London Borough of Redbridge became the first local authority to bring CIL into legal force in its area. The most significant use of the policy is the ability of the Mayor of London to charge CIL across the whole of London. The Mayor's CIL is specifically intended to assist in the funding of the Crossrail project.

=== Reception ===
The Community Infrastructure Levy is not universally popular. For example, Richard Benyon MP for Newbury has expressed concern that it will raise less money for West Berkshire Council than the existing regime.

The Association for Consultancy and Engineering produced an analysis of Community Infrastructure Levy in October 2018 which found that £443 million of CIL is currently unspent by councils in England and Wales. Their report called for CIL to be replaced with a property sales levy in the medium to long term.

== See also ==
- Town and country planning in the United Kingdom
- Planning and Compulsory Purchase Act 2004
- Planning Policy Guidance Notes
- Grampian condition
- Planning Act 2008
- Localism Act 2011
- Land Value Tax
