= Nationally significant infrastructure project =

Major infrastructure developments in England and Wales

In England and Wales, a nationally significant infrastructure project (NSIP) is a major infrastructure development that bypasses normal local planning requirements. These include proposals for power plants, large renewable energy projects, large water supply and wastewater projects, new airports and airport extensions, and major road and rail projects. The NSIP nomenclature began to be used in 2008, and since April 2012 these projects have been managed by the Planning Inspectorate.

== History ==
NSIP were initially controlled by the Infrastructure Planning Commission (IPC), which was established by the Planning Act 2008, which began operating on 1 October 2009 on an advice and guidance basis. Full powers of the IPC to receive, examine and approve applications for development consent came into force on 1 March 2010.

The IPC was subsequently abolished by the Localism Act 2011, which transferred decision-making powers created by the 2008 Act to the relevant Secretary of State. Since 1 April 2012, acceptance and examination of applications for development consent is dealt with by a new Infrastructure Planning Unit within the Planning Inspectorate.

== Procedure ==
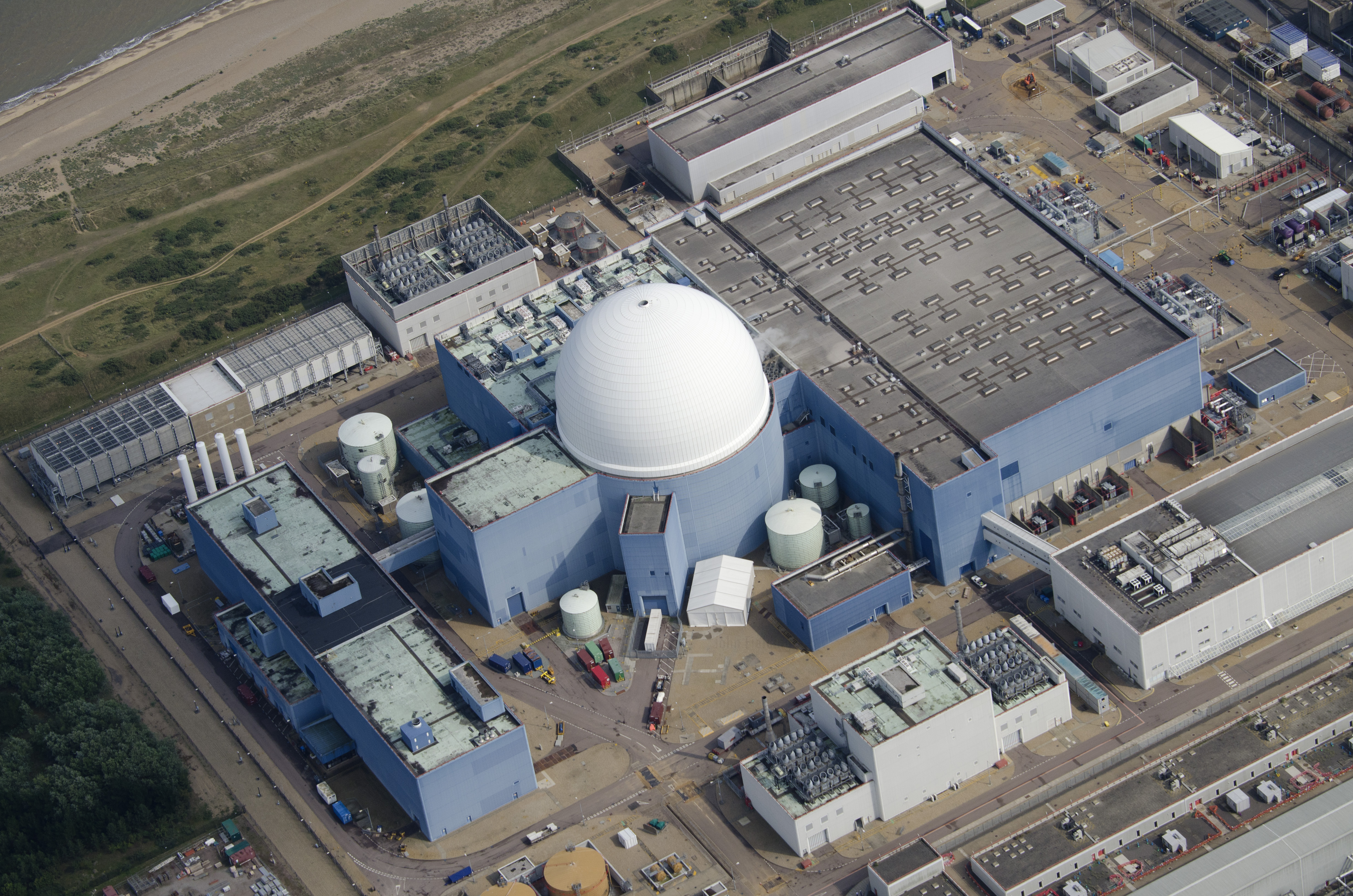
Sizewell B Nuclear Power Station

NSIP are given planning permission via a Development Consent Order (DCO). The Planning Act 2008 created a new regime for development consent for certain types of nationally significant infrastructure, including but not limited to nuclear and wind energy, airports, harbours, and wastewater projects. This new regime was intended to replace the traditional planning system and managed to reduce uncertainty around NSIP by introducing DCOs which were aimed towards increasing efficiency by reducing the amount of consent regimes required to meet development consent, as the old system required approval over several pieces of legislation.

One example would be that the Sizewell B nuclear power station required consent under legislation including Section 2 of the Electric Lighting Act 1909 and planning permission in Section 40 of the Town and Country Planning Act. This was amended under Part 4 of the Planning Act 2008, where this new process would require a DCO. This is an application for approval to construct a NSIP which is dealt with by the Planning Inspectorate who recommends the application to the Secretary of State, who in turn has the authority to decide upon whether development should go ahead.

Prior to the introduction of the Planning Act 2008, it was apparent that the town and planning system was not a "one-size fits all" solution when it came to major infrastructure projects such as Heathrow Terminal 5, which had planning permission granted eight years after the inquiry was submitted. The introduction of the Planning Act was seen as more successful than the previous regime by most accounts, as it reduced costs associated with the inefficient planning system by taking a more front-loaded approach such as the unification of the consent regime, introduction of National Policy Statements and introduction of a fixed timetable for the various stages of the application.

== Criticisms of the new procedure ==
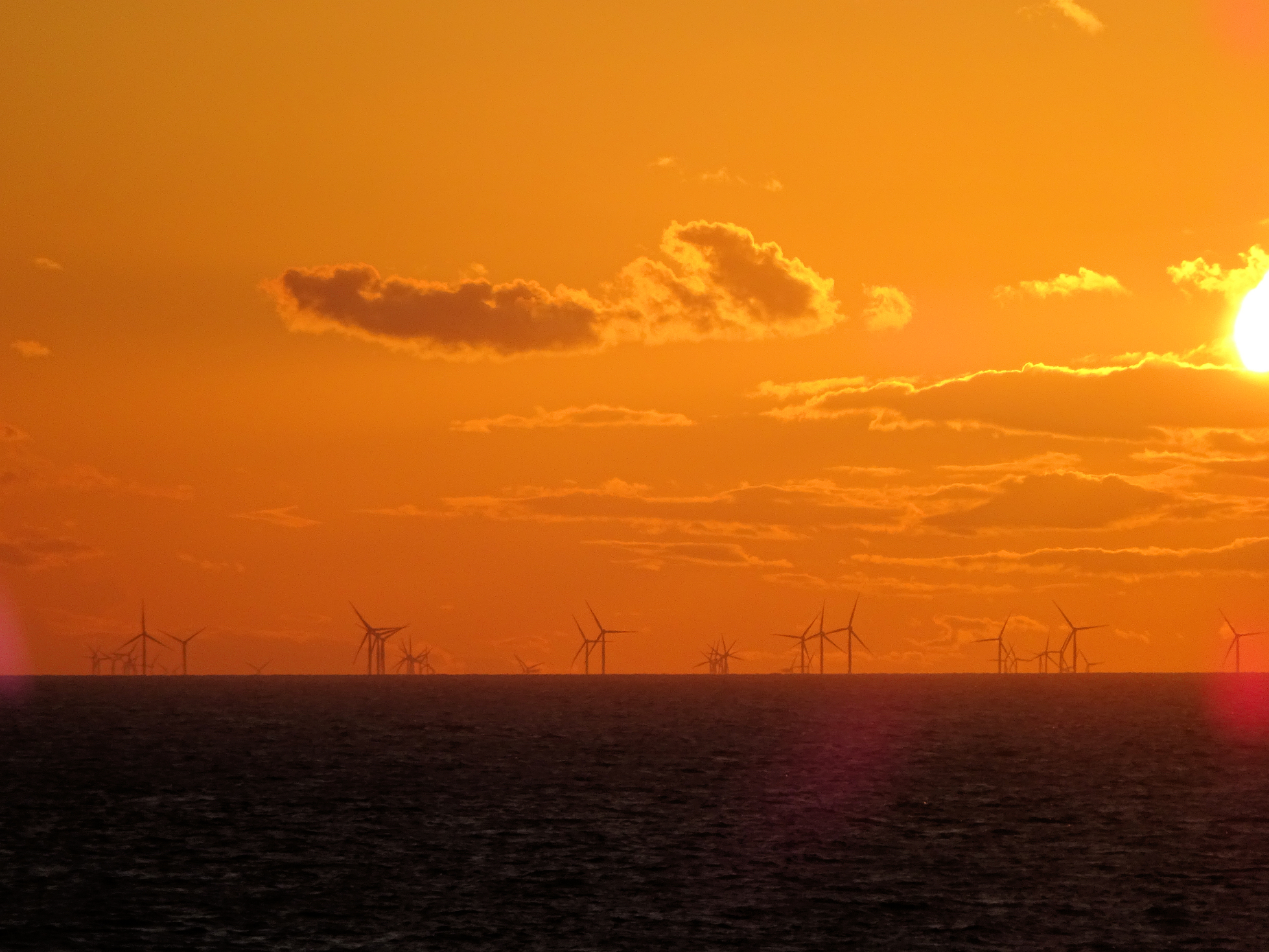
Galloper offshore wind farm

The new procedure was criticised in various ways; one such criticism was that past the application stage, there was very little room for amendment. This could potentially be expensive and time-consuming if amendments to a DCO would be made. An example would be Galloper offshore wind farm, where there had been a request submitted for a "non-material" change which specified a slight amendment to the diameter of each monopile foundation from 7 meters (23 feet) to less than 7.5 meters (25 feet). This non-material change had been crucial to the construction of the wind turbines and had it not been approved, the entire NSIP would have been financially unviable. This reluctance for the approval of material amendments was strictly in line with the vigorous pre-consultation requirements under part 4 of the Planning Act 2008, which many criticisms were also directed towards. A report published by the Ministry of Housing, Communities and Local Government detailing a post-implementation review of the new planning system has shown that there have not been any applications for a "material change" yet.

Common criticisms were directed towards the extensive pre-consultation requirements which meant that applications would take a long time to prepare as it takes two and a half months for consultation with the local authorities, the local community and statutory consultees before an application could be approved. An example would be the need for public consultation as the Planning Act 2008 requires that all applications for a DCO must follow the National Policy Statements, and during the pre-application process Section 47 requires the applicant to prepare a statement regarding how they propose to consult the local community. However, local residents revealed that pre-application consultation fell within the range of 'poor' to 'very poor' and a prominent critique was that communication between local authorities and the local community was too one sided and developers were reluctant to engage with local opinions and dialogue.

== Amendments ==
=== Planning Act 2008 ===
Prior to the introduction of the Planning Act 2008, consents were often required under two or three pieces of legislation for a single project. The need for several different pieces of legislation to achieve planning consent meant that attempting to gain planning approval often led to delay, uncertainty and frustration. The introduction of the Planning Act 2008 managed to remove the need for other consent regimes providing a "one stop shop" to receive consent, instead of having to go to several bodies. Part 4 of the Planning Act 2008 states that NSIP will require a DCO, eliminating the need to seek approval under different regimes.

=== Localism Act 2011 ===
The Localism Act 2011, which received royal assent on 15 November 2011, introduced further reforms towards the planning process for NSIP. The Localism Act 2011 reduced the number of local authorities that need to be consulted during the pre-application stage. In addition, the requirement that community consultation had to be published in a local newspaper was removed. This addressed some common complaints towards the planning process, which included that the pre-consultation requirements for NSIP were too onerous and time-consuming.

== See also ==
- Aarhus Convention
