= Section 106 =

Section 106 may refer to:

- Section 106 of the Town and Country Planning Act 1990 (in the United Kingdom)
- Section 106 of the National Historic Preservation Act of 1966 (in the United States of America)
- Section 106 of the Indian Penal Code, defining the right of private defence
