= Michael Pitt (civil servant) =

British civil servant

Sir Michael Edward Pitt DL (born 2 February 1949) is chair of the Legal Services Board which is the oversight regulator for the legal sector in England and Wales.

He was previously chair of the Infrastructure Planning Commission, which has the role of considering planning applications for national infrastructure projects under the Planning Act 2008, and was appointed Chief Executive of the Planning Inspectorate on 1 April 2011.

Pitt graduated from University College London in 1970 with a first class honours degree in Civil Engineering. He has worked for the civil service, private sector and local government, with the majority of his career in County Council Technical Departments.

During 1990 he was appointed as Chief Executive of Cheshire County Council, and was Chief Executive of Kent County Council from 1997 to 2005.

He was formerly the national President of the Society of Local Authority Chief Executives.

In April 2006, Sir Michael was appointed as Chair of the South West Strategic Health Authority (known as NHS South West), which oversees the operation of the National Health Service in the South West of England. He held the post until mid-2009.

On 8 August 2007 Sir Michael was appointed by the Secretary of State for the Environment, Food and Rural Affairs to chair an independent review into the floods which affected parts of the United Kingdom in the summer of 2007. His final report was published in June 2008, and the government has since begun to implement his recommendations.

He has held a range of other appointments including the chairmanship of the General Medical Council’s National Revalidation Programme Board, and chairing two companies (Solace Enterprises Ltd and Swindon Commercial Services) and providing consultancy advice to a variety of public sector organisations. He is also a trustee of a family mediation charity in Wiltshire, Mediation Plus.

Pitt received a knighthood in the Queen's Birthday Honours List in June 2005 for services to local government. In February 2009, he was appointed a Deputy Lieutenant for Wiltshire.
