= List of Scottish statutory instruments, 2007 =

This is a complete list of Scottish statutory instruments in 2007.

== 1-100 ==
- Products of Animal Origin (Third Country Imports) (Scotland) Regulations 2007 (S.S.I. 2007/1)
- Non-Domestic Rate (Scotland) Order 2007 (S.S.I. 2007/2)
- Argyll and Bute Council (Pilotage Powers) Order 2007 (S.S.I. 2007/3)
- Road Works (Inspection Fees) (Scotland) Amendment Regulations 2007 (S.S.I. 2007/4)
- Tarbert (Loch Fyne) Harbour Revision (Constitution) Order 2007 (S.S.I. 2007/5)
- Act of Sederunt (Ordinary Cause, Summary Application, Summary Cause and Small Claim Rules) Amendment (Miscellaneous) 2007 (S.S.I. 2007/6)
- Act of Sederunt (Rules of the Court of Session Amendment) (Miscellaneous) 2007 (S.S.I. 2007/7)
- Drugs Assessor (Qualifications and Experience) (Scotland) Regulations 2007 (S.S.I. 2007/8)
- Health Act 2006 (Commencement No. 1) (Scotland) Order 2007 (S.S.I. 2007/9)
- Health and Social Care (Community Health and Standards) Act 2003 (Commencement No. 1 and Savings) (Scotland) Order 2007 (S.S.I. 2007/10)
- Food Hygiene (Scotland) Amendment Regulations 2007 (S.S.I. 2007/11)
- Prohibition of Fishing with Multiple Trawls (No. 2) (Scotland) Amendment Order 2007 (S.S.I. 2007/13)
- Civil Legal Aid (Scotland) (Fees) Amendment Regulations 2007 (S.S.I. 2007/14)
- Antisocial Behaviour (Fixed Penalty Offence) (Prescribed Area) (Scotland) Regulations 2007 (S.S.I. 2007/15)
- Tenements (Scotland) Act 2004 (Prescribed Risks) Order 2007 (S.S.I. 2007/16)
- Tenements (Scotland) Act 2004 (Commencement No. 2) Order 2007 (S.S.I. 2007/17)
- Tweed Regulation Order 2007 (S.S.I. 2007/19)
- Adults with Incapacity (Ethics Committee) (Scotland) Amendment Regulations 2007 (S.S.I. 2007/22)
- Strathclyde Passenger Transport Authority (Constitution, Membership and Transitional and Consequential Provisions) Amendment Order 2007 (S.S.I. 2007/23)
- Police Grant (Variation) (Scotland) Order 2007 (S.S.I. 2007/24)
- Local Governance (Scotland) Act 2004 (Commencement No. 4) Order 2007 (S.S.I. 2007/25)
- Local Electoral Administration and Registration Services (Scotland) Act 2006 (Commencement No. 2 and Transitional Provisions) Order 2007 (S.S.I. 2007/26)
- Sulphur Content of Liquid Fuels (Scotland) Regulations 2007 (S.S.I. 2007/27)
- Police (Injury Benefit) (Scotland) Revocation Regulations 2007 (S.S.I. 2007/28)
- Contaminants in Food (Scotland) Regulations 2007 (S.S.I. 2007/29)
- Specified Animal Pathogens Amendment (Scotland) Order 2007 (S.S.I. 2007/30)
- Scottish Schools (Parental Involvement) Act 2006 (Commencement No. 2) Order 2007 (S.S.I. 2007/31)
- Sex Discrimination (Public Authorities) (Statutory Duties) (Scotland) Order 2007 (S.S.I. 2007/32)
- Licensing Register (Scotland) Regulations 2007 (S.S.I. 2007/33)
- Licence Transfer (Prescribed Persons) (Scotland) Regulations 2007 (S.S.I. 2007/34)
- Licensing (Closure Orders) (Scotland) Regulations 2007 (S.S.I. 2007/35)
- Non Domestic Rating (Rural Areas and Rateable Value Limits) (Scotland) Amendment Order 2007 (S.S.I. 2007/36)
- Notification of Marketing of Food for Particular Nutritional Uses (Scotland) Regulations 2007 (S.S.I. 2007/37)
- Food Protection (Emergency Prohibitions) (Radioactivity in Sheep) Partial Revocation (Scotland) Order 2007 (S.S.I. 2007/38)
- Sea Fishing (Prohibition on the Removal of Shark Fins) (Scotland) Order 2007 (S.S.I. 2007/39)
- Sea Fishing (Restriction on Days at Sea) (Scotland) Order 2007 (S.S.I. 2007/40)
- Scottish Local Government Elections Order 2007 (S.S.I. 2007/42)
- Tourist Boards (Scotland) Act 2006 (Commencement) Order 2007 (S.S.I. 2007/47)
- Planning etc. (Scotland) Act 2006 (Commencement No. 1) Order 2007 (S.S.I. 2007/49)
- Water Environment and Water Services (Scotland) Act 2003 (Commencement No. 5) Order 2007 (S.S.I. 2007/50)
- Registration Services (Miscellaneous Provisions) (Scotland) Regulations 2007 (S.S.I. 2007/52)
- Registration of Civil Partnerships (Prescription of Forms, Publicisation and Errors) (Scotland) Amendment Regulations 2007 (S.S.I. 2007/53)
- Registration of Births, Deaths and Marriages (Re registration) (Scotland) Regulations 2007 (S.S.I. 2007/54)
- Smoke Control Areas (Exempt Fireplaces) (Scotland) Order 2007 (S.S.I. 2007/55)
- Smoke Control Areas (Authorised Fuels) (Scotland) Amendment Regulations 2007 (S.S.I. 2007/56)
- Legal Profession and Legal Aid (Scotland) Act 2007 (Commencement No. 1) Order 2007 (S.S.I. 2007/57)
- Title Conditions (Scotland) Act 2003 (Rural Housing Bodies) Amendment Order 2007 (S.S.I. 2007/58)
- Civil Legal Aid (Scotland) Amendment Regulations 2007 (S.S.I. 2007/59)
- Advice and Assistance (Scotland) Amendment Regulations 2007 (S.S.I. 2007/60)
- Avian Influenza (H5N1 in Wild Birds) (Scotland) Order 2007 (S.S.I. 2007/61)
- Avian Influenza (H5N1 in Poultry) (Scotland) Order 2007 (S.S.I. 2007/62)
- Sea Fish (Prohibited Methods of Fishing) (Firth of Clyde) Order 2007 (S.S.I. 2007/63)
- Local Government Finance (Scotland) Order 2007 (S.S.I. 2007/65)
- Forestry Commission Byelaws 1982 Revocation (Scotland) Byelaws 2007 (S.S.I. 2007/66)
- Regulation of Care (Scotland) Act 2001 (Commencement No. 7 and Transitional Provisions) Amendment Order 2007 (S.S.I. 2007/67)
- Police (Injury Benefit) (Scotland) Regulations 2007 (S.S.I. 2007/68)
- Avian Influenza (Preventive Measures) (Scotland) Order 2007 (S.S.I. 2007/69)
- Local Government Pensions Etc. (Councillors and VisitScotland) (Scotland) Amendment Regulations 2007 (S.S.I. 2007/71)
- Sexual Offences Act 2003 (Prescribed Police Stations) (Scotland) Amendment Regulations 2007 (S.S.I. 2007/72)
- Housing Revenue Account General Fund Contribution Limits (Scotland) Order 2007 (S.S.I. 2007/73)
- Housing (Scotland) Act 2001 (Alteration of Housing Finance Arrangements) Order 2007 (S.S.I. 2007/74)
- Rehabilitation of Offenders Act 1974 (Exclusions and Exceptions) (Scotland) Amendment Order 2007 (S.S.I. 2007/75)
- Licensing (Clubs) (Scotland) Regulations 2007 (S.S.I. 2007/76)
- Personal Licence (Scotland) Regulations 2007 (S.S.I. 2007/77)
- Food Supplements (Scotland) Amendment Regulations 2007 (S.S.I. 2007/78)
- Public Service Vehicles (Registration of Local Services) (Scotland) Amendment Regulations 2007 (S.S.I. 2007/79)
- Conservation (Natural Habitats, &c.) Amendment (Scotland) Regulations 2007 (S.S.I. 2007/80)
- Valuation Timetable (Scotland) Amendment Order 2007 (S.S.I. 2007/81)
- Bankruptcy and Diligence etc. (Scotland) Act 2007 (Commencement No. 1) Order 2007 (S.S.I. 2007/82)
- Police, Public Order and Criminal Justice (Scotland) Act 2006 (Commencement No. 3, Transitional and Savings Provisions) Order 2007 (S.S.I. 2007/84)
- Home Energy Efficiency Scheme (Scotland) Amendment Regulations 2007 (S.S.I. 2007/85)
- Act of Sederunt (Rules of the Court of Session Amendment No. 2) (Fees of Solicitors) 2007 (S.S.I. 2007/86)
- Act of Sederunt (Fees of Solicitors in the Sheriff Court) (Amendment) 2007 (S.S.I. 2007/87)
- Scottish Police Services Authority (Staff Transfer) Order 2007 (S.S.I. 2007/88)
- Police, Public Order and Criminal Justice (Scotland) Act 2006 (Consequential Modifications) Order 2007 (S.S.I. 2007/89)
- Scottish Crime and Drug Enforcement Agency (Appointment of Police Members) Regulations 2007 (S.S.I. 2007/90)
- Official Controls (Animals, Feed and Food) (Scotland) Regulations 2007 (S.S.I. 2007/91)
- Management of Offenders etc. (Scotland) Act 2005 (Specification of Persons) Order 2007 (S.S.I. 2007/92)
- Sale of Alcohol to Children and Young Persons (Scotland) Regulations 2007 (S.S.I. 2007/93)
- Potatoes Originating in Egypt (Scotland) Amendment Regulations 2007 (S.S.I. 2007/94)
- Licensing (Training) (Scotland) Regulations 2007 (S.S.I. 2007/95)
- Occasional Licence (Scotland) Regulations 2007 (S.S.I. 2007/96)
- Licensing (Designated Airports) (Scotland) Order 2007 (S.S.I. 2007/97)
- Licensing Qualification (Scotland) Regulations 2007 (S.S.I. 2007/98)
- Common Agricultural Policy Schemes (Cross-Compliance) (Scotland) Amendment Regulations 2007 (S.S.I. 2007/99)
- Adults with Incapacity (Conditions and Circumstances Applicable to Three Year Medical Treatment Certificates) (Scotland) Regulations 2007 (S.S.I. 2007/100)

== 101-200 ==
- Vulnerable Witnesses (Scotland) Act 2004 (Commencement No. 4, Savings and Transitional Provisions) Order 2007 (S.S.I. 2007/101)
- National Assistance (Assessment of Resources) Amendment (Scotland) Regulations 2007 (S.S.I. 2007/102)
- National Assistance (Sums for Personal Requirements) (Scotland) Regulations 2007 (S.S.I. 2007/103)
- Adults with Incapacity (Medical Treatment Certificates) (Scotland) Regulations 2007 (S.S.I. 2007/104)
- Adults with Incapacity (Requirements for Signing Medical Treatment Certificates) (Scotland) Regulations 2007 (S.S.I. 2007/105)
- Quick-frozen Foodstuffs Amendment (Scotland) Regulations 2007 (S.S.I. 2007/106)
- Local Government (Allowances and Expenses) (Scotland) Regulations 2007 (S.S.I. 2007/108)
- Police Grant (Scotland) Order 2007 (S.S.I. 2007/109)
- Public Appointments and Public Bodies etc. (Scotland) Act 2003 (Amendment of Specified Authorities) Order 2007 (S.S.I. 2007/110)
- Police Act 1997 (Criminal Records) (Scotland) Amendment Regulations 2007 (S.S.I. 2007/112)
- Act of Sederunt (Registration Appeal Court) 2007 (S.S.I. 2007/113)
- Education (Assisted Places) (Scotland) Amendment Regulations 2007 (S.S.I. 2007/114)
- St Mary's Music School (Aided Places) (Scotland) Amendment Regulations 2007 (S.S.I. 2007/115)
- Queen Margaret University, Edinburgh (Scotland) Order of Council 2007 (S.S.I. 2007/116)
- Charities and Trustee Investment (Scotland) Act 2005 (Commencement No. 4) Order 2007 (S.S.I. 2007/117)
- Dairy Produce Quotas (Scotland) Amendment Regulations 2007 (S.S.I. 2007/118)
- Plant Protection Products (Scotland) Amendment Regulations 2007 (S.S.I. 2007/119)
- Supervised Attendance Order (Prescribed Courts) (Scotland) Order 2007 (S.S.I. 2007/120)
- Divorce etc. (Pensions) (Scotland) Amendment Regulations 2007 (S.S.I. 2007/122)
- Town and Country Planning (Prescribed Date) (Scotland) Regulations 2007 (S.S.I. 2007/123)
- Valuation Appeal Committee (Electronic Communications) (Scotland) Order 2007 124)
- Football Banning Orders (Regulated Football Matches) (Scotland) Order 2007 (S.S.I. 2007/125)
- Conservation of Seals (Scotland) Order 2007 (S.S.I. 2007/126)
- Sea Fishing (Enforcement of Community Quota and Third Country Fishing Measures) (Scotland) Order 2007 (S.S.I. 2007/127)
- Licensing (Appointed Day and Transitional Provisions) (Scotland) Order 2007 (S.S.I. 2007/128)
- Licensing (Scotland) Act 2005 (Commencement No. 3) Order 2007 (S.S.I. 2007/129)
- Planning etc. (Scotland) Act 2006 (Commencement No. 2) Order 2007 (S.S.I. 2007/130)
- Testing of Arrested Persons for Class A Drugs (Prescribed Area) (Scotland) Order 2007 (S.S.I. 2007/131)
- Parental Involvement in Headteacher and Deputy Headteacher Appointments (Scotland) Regulations 2007 (S.S.I. 2007/132)
- Marketing of Vegetable Plant Material Amendment (Scotland) Regulations 2007 (S.S.I. 2007/133)
- Police (Scotland) Amendment Regulations 2007 (S.S.I. 2007/134)
- Town and Country Planning (General Permitted Development) (Avian Influenza) (Scotland) Amendment Order 2007 (S.S.I. 2007/135)
- Charities Accounts (Scotland) Amendment Regulations 2007 (S.S.I. 2007/136)
- Plant Health (Export Certification) (Scotland) Amendment Order 2007 (S.S.I. 2007/137)
- Plant Health (Import Inspection Fees) (Scotland) Amendment Regulations 2007 (S.S.I. 2007/138)
- National Health Service (Charges for Drugs and Appliances) (Scotland) Regulations 2007 (S.S.I. 2007/139)
- Legal Profession and Legal Aid (Scotland) Act 2007 (Commencement No. 2) Order 2007 (S.S.I. 2007/140)
- Law Reform (Miscellaneous Provisions) (Scotland) Act 1990 (Commencement No. 16) Order 2007 (S.S.I. 2007/141)
- Pesticides (Maximum Residue Levels in Crops, Food and Feeding Stuffs) (Scotland) Amendment Regulations 2007 (S.S.I. 2007/142)
- Colours in Food Amendment (Scotland) Regulations 2007 (S.S.I. 2007/143)
- Meat (Official Controls Charges) (Scotland) Regulations 2007 (S.S.I. 2007/144)
- Farm Woodland Premium Schemes and SFGS Farmland Premium Scheme Amendment (Scotland) Scheme 2007 (S.S.I. 2007/146)
- Tuberculosis (Scotland) Order 2007 (S.S.I. 2007/147)
- Education (Graduate Endowment, Student Fees and Support) (Scotland) Revocation Regulations 2007 (S.S.I. 2007/148)
- Education Authority Bursaries (Scotland) Regulations 2007 (S.S.I. 2007/149)
- Welfare of Animals (Slaughter or Killing) Amendment (Scotland) Regulations 2007 (S.S.I. 2007/150)
- Nursing and Midwifery Student Allowances (Scotland) Regulations 2007 151)
- Education (Fees and Awards) (Scotland) Regulations 2007 (S.S.I. 2007/152)
- Students' Allowances (Scotland) Regulations 2007 (S.S.I. 2007/153)
- Education (Student Loans) (Scotland) Regulations 2007 (S.S.I. 2007/154)
- Education Maintenance Allowances (Scotland) Regulations 2007 (S.S.I. 2007/156)
- Civil Partnership Act 2004 (Modification of Subordinate Legislation) (Scotland) Revocation Order 2007 (S.S.I. 2007/157)
- Education (Student Loans for Tuition Fees) (Scotland) Amendment Regulations 2007 (S.S.I. 2007/158)
- Repayment of Student Loans (Scotland) Amendment Regulations 2007 (S.S.I. 2007/159)
- Napier University (Scotland) Order of Council 1993 Amendment Order of Council 2007 (S.S.I. 2007/160)
- Transport (Scotland) Act 2005 (Commencement No. 2) Order 2007 (S.S.I. 2007/161)
- Disabled Persons (Badges for Motor Vehicles) (Scotland) Amendment Regulations 2007 (S.S.I. 2007/162)
- Land Reform (Scotland) Act 2003 (Path Orders) Regulations 2007 (S.S.I. 2007/163)
- Individual Learning Account (Scotland) Amendment Regulations 2007 (S.S.I. 2007/164)
- Registered Social Landlords Accounting Requirements (Scotland) Order 2007 (S.S.I. 2007/165)
- Building (Scotland) Amendment Regulations 2007 (S.S.I. 2007/166)
- Building (Procedure) (Scotland) Amendment Regulations 2007 (S.S.I. 2007/167)
- Building (Forms) (Scotland) Amendment Regulations 2007 (S.S.I. 2007/168)
- Building (Fees) (Scotland) Amendment Regulations 2007 (S.S.I. 2007/169)
- Representation of the People (Absent Voting at Local Government Elections) (Scotland) Regulations 2007 (S.S.I. 2007/170)
- Bell College of Technology (Transfer and Closure) (Scotland) Order 2007 (S.S.I. 2007/171)
- Waste Management Licensing Amendment (Waste Electrical and Electronic Equipment) (Scotland) Regulations 2007 (S.S.I. 2007/172)
- Private Rented Housing Panel (Applications and Determinations) (Scotland) Regulations 2007 (S.S.I. 2007/173)
- Cattle Identification (Scotland) Regulations 2007 (S.S.I. 2007/174)
- Town and Country Planning (Marine Fish Farming) (Scotland) Regulations 2007 (S.S.I. 2007/175)
- Planning etc. (Scotland) Act 2006 (Consequential Provisions) Order 2007 (S.S.I. 2007/176)
- Town and Country Planning (General Development Procedure) (Scotland) Amendment Order 2007 (S.S.I. 2007/177)
- Surface Waters (Fishlife) (Classification) (Scotland) Amendment Regulations 2007 (S.S.I. 2007/178)
- Radioactive Contaminated Land (Scotland) Regulations 2007 (S.S.I. 2007/179)
- Criminal Legal Aid (Scotland) (Fees) Amendment Regulations 2007 (S.S.I. 2007/180)
- Civil Legal Aid (Scotland) (Fees) Amendment (No. 2) Regulations 2007 (S.S.I. 2007/181)
- Air Quality Standards (Scotland) Regulations 2007 (S.S.I. 2007/182)
- Local Governance (Scotland) Act 2004 (Remuneration) Regulations 2007 (S.S.I. 2007/183)
- Seeds (Fees) (Scotland) Amendment Regulations 2007 (S.S.I. 2007/184)
- Inshore Fishing (Prohibited Methods of Fishing) (Loch Creran) Order 2007 (S.S.I. 2007/185)
- Inshore Fishing (Prohibited Methods of Fishing) (Firth of Lorn) Order 2007 (S.S.I. 2007/186)
- Debt Arrangement Scheme (Scotland) Amendment (No. 2) Regulations 2007 (S.S.I. 2007/187)
- Curd Cheese (Restriction on Placing on the Market) (Scotland) Revocation Regulations 2007 (S.S.I. 2007/188)
- Teachers' Superannuation (Scotland) Amendment Regulations 2007 (S.S.I. 2007/189)
- Prisons and Young Offenders Institutions (Scotland) Amendment Rules 2007 (S.S.I. 2007/190)
- National Health Service (General Dental Services) (Scotland) Amendment Regulations 2007 (S.S.I. 2007/191)
- National Health Service (Optical Charges and Payments) (Scotland) Amendment Regulations 2007 (S.S.I. 2007/192)
- National Health Service (General Ophthalmic Services) (Scotland) Amendment Regulations 2007 (S.S.I. 2007/193)
- Animals and Animal Products (Import and Export) (Scotland) Regulations 2007 (S.S.I. 2007/194)
- Disability Discrimination (Public Authorities) (Statutory Duties) (Scotland) Amendment Regulations 2007 (S.S.I. 2007/195)
- Gambling Act 2005 (Premises Licences and Provisional Statements) (Scotland) Regulations 2007 (S.S.I. 2007/196)
- Gambling (Premises Licence Fees) (Scotland) Regulations 2007 (S.S.I. 2007/197)
- Firefighters' Compensation Scheme (Scotland) Amendment Order 2007 (S.S.I. 2007/198)
- Firefighters' Pension Scheme (Scotland) Order 2007 (S.S.I. 2007/199)
- Firefighters' Pension Scheme Amendment (Scotland) Order 2007 (S.S.I. 2007/200)

== 201-300 ==
- Police Pensions (Scotland) Regulations 2007 (S.S.I. 2007/201)
- Business Improvement Districts (Scotland) Regulations 2007 (S.S.I. 2007/202)
- Charities References in Documents (Scotland) Regulations 2007 (S.S.I. 2007/203)
- Charities Reorganisation (Scotland) Regulations 2007 (S.S.I. 2007/204)
- National Health Service (Primary Medical Services Section 17C Agreements) (Scotland) Amendment Regulations 2007 (S.S.I. 2007/205)
- National Health Service (General Medical Services Contracts) (Scotland) Amendment Regulations 2007 (S.S.I. 2007/206)
- National Health Service (Primary Medical Services Performers Lists) (Scotland) Amendment Regulations 2007 (S.S.I. 2007/207)
- National Health Service (Pharmaceutical Services) (Scotland) Amendment Regulations 2007 (S.S.I. 2007/208)
- Town and Country Planning (General Permitted Development) (Scotland) Amendment Order 2007 (S.S.I. 2007/209)
- Justices of the Peace (Scotland) Order 2007 (S.S.I. 2007/210)
- Act of Sederunt (Fees of Shorthand Writers in the Sheriff Court) (Amendment) 2007 (S.S.I. 2007/211)
- Valuation Appeal Panels and Committees (Scotland) Amendment Regulations 2007 (S.S.I. 2007/212)
- Council Tax (Discounts) (Scotland) Amendment Regulations 2007 (S.S.I. 2007/213)
- Council Tax (Discounts) (Scotland) Amendment Order 2007 (S.S.I. 2007/214)
- Council Tax (Exempt Dwellings) (Scotland) Amendment Order 2007 (S.S.I. 2007/215)
- Non-Domestic Rates (Levying) (Scotland) Regulations 2007 (S.S.I. 2007/216)
- Horse Passports (Scotland) Amendment Regulations 2007 (S.S.I. 2007/217)
- Smoking, Health and Social Care (Scotland) Act 2005 (Commencement No. 5) Order 2007 (S.S.I. 2007/218)
- Water Environment (Controlled Activities) (Scotland) Amendment Regulations 2007 (S.S.I. 2007/219)
- Bankruptcy Fees (Scotland) Amendment Regulations 2007 (S.S.I. 2007/220)
- Town and Country Planning (Application of Subordinate Legislation to the Crown) (Scotland) Amendment Order 2007 (S.S.I. 2007/221)
- Personal Injuries (NHS Charges) (Reviews and Appeals) (Scotland) Amendment Regulations 2007 (S.S.I. 2007/222)
- Health and Social Care (Community Health and Standards) Act 2003 Supplementary Provisions (Recovery of NHS Charges) (Scotland) Order 2007 (S.S.I. 2007/223)
- Seed (Scotland) (Amendments for Tests and Trials etc.) Regulations 2007 (S.S.I. 2007/224)
- National Health Service (Travelling Expenses and Remission of Charges) (Scotland) Amendment Regulations 2007 (S.S.I. 2007/225)
- Regulation of Care (Scotland) Act 2001 (Minimum Frequency of Inspections) Order 2007 (S.S.I. 2007/231)
- Transfer of Functions, Property, Rights and Liabilities from the Strathclyde Passenger Transport Executive to the Strathclyde Passenger Transport Authority Order 2007 (S.S.I. 2007/232)
- Act of Sederunt (Summary Applications, Statutory Applications and Appeals etc. Rules) Amendment (Animal Welfare Act 2006) 2007 (S.S.I. 2007/233)
- Act of Sederunt (Rules of the Court of Session Amendment No. 3) (Fees of Shorthand Writers) 2007 (S.S.I. 2007/234)
- Act of Adjournal (Criminal Procedure Rules Amendment No. 2) (Vulnerable Witnesses (Scotland) Act 2004) 2007 (S.S.I. 2007/237)
- Act of Adjournal (Criminal Procedure Rules Amendment) (Animal Health and Welfare etc.) 2007 (S.S.I. 2007/238)
- Inshore Fishing (Prohibited Methods of Fishing) (Firth of Lorn) Revocation Order 2007 (S.S.I. 2007/239)
- Inshore Fishing (Prohibited Methods of Fishing) (Firth of Lorn) (No. 2) Order 2007 (S.S.I. 2007/240)
- Serious Organised Crime and Police Act 2005 (Commencement No. 10) Order 2007 (S.S.I. 2007/241)
- Private Security Industry Act 2001 (Commencement No. 2) (Scotland) Order 2007 (S.S.I. 2007/242)
- Mental Health (Safety and Security) (Scotland) Amendment Regulations 2007 (S.S.I. 2007/243)
- Budget (Scotland) Act 2006 Amendment Order 2007 (S.S.I. 2007/244)
- Sexual Offences Act 2003 (Notification Requirements) (Scotland) Regulations 2007 (S.S.I. 2007/246)
- Advice and Assistance (Financial Conditions) (Scotland) Regulations 2007 (S.S.I. 2007/247)
- Advice and Assistance (Financial Limit) (Scotland) Amendment Regulations 2007 (S.S.I. 2007/248)
- Civil Legal Aid (Financial Conditions) (Scotland) Regulations 2007 (S.S.I. 2007/249)
- Criminal Proceedings etc. (Reform) (Scotland) Act 2007 (Commencement and Savings) Order 2007 (S.S.I. 2007/250)
- National Waste Management Plan for Scotland Regulations 2007 (S.S.I. 2007/251)
- Housing Support Grant (Scotland) Order 2007 (S.S.I. 2007/252)
- Town and Country Planning (Fees for Applications and Deemed Applications) (Scotland) Amendment Regulations 2007 (S.S.I. 2007/253)
- Poultry Breeding Flocks and Hatcheries (Scotland) Order 2007 (S.S.I. 2007/254)
- Fundable Bodies (Scotland) Order 2007 (S.S.I. 2007/255)
- Prohibited Procedures on Protected Animals (Exemptions) (Scotland) Regulations 2007 (S.S.I. 2007/256)
- Animal Health and Welfare (Scotland) Act 2006 (Commencement No. 2) Order 2007 (S.S.I. 2007/257)
- Number of Inner House Judges (Variation) Order 2007 (S.S.I. 2007/258)
- National Health Service (Travelling Expenses and Remission of Charges) (Scotland) Amendment (No. 2) Regulations 2007 (S.S.I. 2007/259)
- Police, Public Order and Criminal Justice (Scotland) Act 2006 (Modification of Agency's Powers and Incidental Provision) Order 2007 (S.S.I. 2007/260)
- Business Improvement Districts (Ballot Arrangements) (Scotland) Regulations 2007 (S.S.I. 2007/261)
- Debt Arrangement Scheme (Scotland) Amendment Regulations 2007 (S.S.I. 2007/262)
- Representation of the People (Postal Voting for Local Government Elections) (Scotland) Regulations 2007 (S.S.I. 2007/263)
- Representation of the People (Post-Local Government Elections Supply and Inspection of Documents) (Scotland) Regulations 2007 (S.S.I. 2007/264)
- Local Governance (Scotland) Act 2004 (Allowances and Expenses) Regulations 2007 (S.S.I. 2007/265)
- Gambling Act 2005 (Mandatory and Default Conditions) (Scotland) Regulations 2007 (S.S.I. 2007/266)
- Renewables Obligation (Scotland) Order 2007 (S.S.I. 2007/267)
- Town and Country Planning (Marine Fish Farming) (Scotland) Order 2007 (S.S.I. 2007/268)
- Crofting Reform etc. Act 2007 (Commencement No. 1) Order 2007 (S.S.I. 2007/269)
- Housing (Scotland) Act 2006 (Commencement No. 5, Savings and Transitional Provisions) Order 2007 (S.S.I. 2007/270)
- Act of Adjournal (Criminal Procedure Rules Amendment No. 3) (Miscellaneous) 2007 (S.S.I. 2007/276)
- Act of Sederunt (Rules of the Court of Session Amendment No. 4) (Personal Injuries Actions etc.) 2007 (S.S.I. 2007/282)
- Act of Sederunt (Rules of the Court of Session Amendment No. 5) (Immigration, Asylum and Nationality Act 2006) 2007 (S.S.I. 2007/283)
- Lerwick Harbour Revision Order 2007 (S.S.I. 2007/284)

== 301-400 ==
- Spreadable Fats (Marketing Standards) (Scotland) Amendment Regulations 2007 (S.S.I. 2007/303)
- Products of Animal Origin (Third Country Imports) (Scotland) Amendment Regulations 2007 (S.S.I. 2007/304)
- Vegetable Seeds Amendment (Scotland) Regulations 2007 (S.S.I. 2007/305)
- Pesticides (Maximum Residue Levels in Crops, Food and Feeding Stuffs) (Scotland) Amendment (No. 2) Regulations 2007 (S.S.I. 2007/306)
- European Fisheries Fund (Grants) (Scotland) Regulations 2007 (S.S.I. 2007/307)
- Port of Cairnryan Harbour Empowerment Order 2007 (S.S.I. 2007/308)
- Gambling Act 2005 (Fees) (Scotland) Regulations 2007 (S.S.I. 2007/309)
- Gambling Act 2005 (Fees No. 2) (Scotland) Regulations 2007 (S.S.I. 2007/311)
- Cattle Identification (Scotland) Amendment Regulations 2007 (S.S.I. 2007/312)
- Licensing (Miscellaneous Amendments) (Scotland) Regulations 2007 (S.S.I. 2007/313)
- Plant Health Fees (Scotland) Amendment Regulations 2007 (S.S.I. 2007/314)
- Education (Publication and Consultation Etc.) (Scotland) Amendment Regulations 2007 (S.S.I. 2007/315)
- Health Protection Agency (Scottish Health Functions) Amendment Order 2007 (S.S.I. 2007/316)
- National Health Service (Charges for Drugs and Appliances) (Scotland) Amendment Regulations 2007 (S.S.I. 2007/317)
- Sheriff Court Fees Amendment Order 2007 (S.S.I. 2007/318)
- Court of Session etc. Fees Amendment Order 2007 (S.S.I. 2007/319)
- Adults with Incapacity (Public Guardian's Fees) (Scotland) Amendment Regulations 2007 (S.S.I. 2007/320)
- High Court of Justiciary Fees Amendment Order 2007 (S.S.I. 2007/321)
- Discontinuance of Low Moss Prison (Scotland) Order 2007 (S.S.I. 2007/322)
- Sports Grounds and Sporting Events (Designation) (Scotland) Amendment Order 2007 (S.S.I. 2007/324)
- Addition of Vitamins, Minerals and Other Substances (Scotland) Regulations 2007 (S.S.I. 2007/325)
- Vulnerable Witnesses (Scotland) Act 2004 (Commencement No. 5, Savings and Transitional Provisions) Order 2007 (S.S.I. 2007/329)
- Bovine Semen (Scotland) Regulations 2007 (S.S.I. 2007/330)
- Gambling Act 2005 (Premises Licences and Provisional Statements) (Scotland) Amendment Regulations 2007 (S.S.I. 2007/332)
- Aquaculture and Fisheries (Scotland) Act 2007 (Commencement and Transitional Provisions) Order 2007 (S.S.I. 2007/333)
- Adult Support and Protection (Scotland) Act 2007 (Commencement No. 1, Transitional Provision and Savings) Order 2007 (S.S.I. 2007/334)
- Legal Profession and Legal Aid (Scotland) Act 2007 (Commencement No. 3) Order 2007 (S.S.I. 2007/335)
- Licensing Conditions (Late Opening Premises) (Scotland) Regulations 2007 (S.S.I. 2007/336)
- Bovine Products (Restriction on Placing on the Market) (Scotland) (No. 2) Amendment Regulations 2007 (S.S.I. 2007/338)
- Act of Sederunt (Ordinary Cause, Summary Application, Summary Cause and Small Claim Rules) Amendment (Equality Act (Sexual Orientation) Regulations 2007) 2007 (S.S.I. 2007/339)
- Renfrewshire Council (Cart Navigation) Harbour Revision Order 2007 (S.S.I. 2007/347)
- River Ness Salmon Fishery District (Baits and Lures) Regulations 2007 (S.S.I. 2007/348)
- Conservation (Natural Habitats, &c.) Amendment (No. 2) (Scotland) Regulations 2007 (S.S.I. 2007/349)
- Act of Sederunt (Rules of the Court of Session Amendment No. 6) (Recognition and Enforcement of Judgments in Civil and Commercial Matters) 2007 (S.S.I. 2007/350)
- Act of Sederunt (Sheriff Court European Enforcement Order Rules) Amendment (Extension to Denmark) 2007 (S.S.I. 2007/351)
- Reciprocal Enforcement of Maintenance Orders (United States of America) (Scotland) Order 2007 (S.S.I. 2007/354)
- Recovery of Maintenance (United States of America) (Scotland) Order 2007 (S.S.I. 2007/355)
- Transmissible Spongiform Encephalopathies (Scotland) Amendment Regulations 2007 (S.S.I. 2007/357)
- European Communities (Lawyer's Practice) (Scotland) Amendment Regulations 2007 (S.S.I. 2007/358)
- European Communities (Services of Lawyers) Amendment (Scotland) Order 2007 (S.S.I. 2007/359)
- Act of Sederunt (Rules of the Court of Session Amendment No. 7) (Devolution Issues) 2007 (S.S.I. 2007/360)
- Act of Adjournal (Criminal Procedure Rules Amendment No. 4) (Devolution Issues) 2007 (S.S.I. 2007/361)
- Act of Sederunt (Proceedings for Determination of Devolution Issues Rules) Amendment 2007 (S.S.I. 2007/362)
- Food (Suspension of the Use of E 128 Red 2G as Food Colour) (Scotland) Regulations 2007 (S.S.I. 2007/363)
- Schools (Health Promotion and Nutrition) (Scotland) Act 2007 (Commencement No. 1) Order 2007 (S.S.I. 2007/372)
- Animals and Animal Products (Import and Export) (Scotland) Amendment Regulations 2007 (S.S.I. 2007/375)
- Import and Export Restrictions (Foot-and-Mouth Disease) (Scotland) (No. 2) Regulations 2007 (S.S.I. 2007/377)
- Scottish Local Government Elections Amendment Order 2007 (S.S.I. 2007/379)
- Prostitution (Public Places) (Scotland) Act 2007 (Commencement) Order 2007 (S.S.I. 2007/382)
- Nutrition and Health Claims (Scotland) Regulations 2007 (S.S.I. 2007/383)
- Protection of Vulnerable Groups (Scotland) Act 2007 (Commencement No. 1) Order 2007 (S.S.I. 2007/385)
- Foot-and-Mouth Disease (Export Restrictions) (Scotland) Regulations 2007 (S.S.I. 2007/386)
- Disease Control (Interim Measures) (Scotland) Amendment Order 2007 (S.S.I. 2007/387)
- National Health Service (Charges for Drugs and Appliances) (Scotland) (No. 2) Regulations 2007 (S.S.I. 2007/389)
- National Health Service (Pharmaceutical Services) (Scotland) Amendment (No. 2) Regulations 2007 (S.S.I. 2007/390)
- National Health Service (Travelling Expenses and Remission of Charges) (Scotland) Amendment (No. 3) Regulations 2007 (S.S.I. 2007/391)
- National Health Service (General Medical Services Contracts) (Scotland) Amendment (No. 2) Regulations 2007 (S.S.I. 2007/392)
- National Health Service (Primary Medical Services Section 17C Agreements) (Scotland) Amendment (No. 2) Regulations 2007 393)
- Gambling Act 2005 (Review of Premises Licences) (Scotland) Regulations 2007 (S.S.I. 2007/394)
- Gambling Act 2005 (Fees No. 3) (Scotland) Regulations 2007 (S.S.I. 2007/395)
- Provision of School Education for Children under School Age (Prescribed Children) (Scotland) Amendment Order 2007 (S.S.I. 2007/396)
- Licensing (Training of Staff) (Scotland) Regulations 2007 (S.S.I. 2007/397)
- Private Security Industry Act 2001 (Designated Activities) (Scotland) Order 2007 (S.S.I. 2007/398)
- Water Industry Commissioner for Scotland (Dissolution) Order 2007 (S.S.I. 2007/399)
- Disease Control (Interim Measures) (Scotland) Amendment (No. 2) Order 2007 (S.S.I. 2007/400)

== 401-500 ==
- Regulation of Care (Social Service Workers) (Scotland) Amendment Order 2007 (S.S.I. 2007/407)
- Transport (Scotland) Act 2005 (Commencement No. 3) Order 2007 (S.S.I. 2007/409)
- Plant Protection Products (Scotland) Amendment (No. 2) Regulations 2007 (S.S.I. 2007/410)
- Scottish Road Works Commissioner (Imposition of Penalties) Regulations 2007 (S.S.I. 2007/411)
- Miscellaneous Food Additives and the Sweeteners in Food Amendment (Scotland) Regulations 2007 (S.S.I. 2007/412)
- National Health Service (Primary Medical Services Performers Lists) (Scotland) Amendment (No. 2) Regulations 2007 (S.S.I. 2007/413)
- Common Agricultural Policy Single Farm Payment and Support Schemes (Scotland) Amendment Regulations 2007 (S.S.I. 2007/414)
- Plant Health (Scotland) (Amendment) Order 2007 (S.S.I. 2007/415)
- Plant Health (Phytophthora ramorum) (Scotland) Amendment Order 2007 (S.S.I. 2007/416)
- Disclosure Scotland (Staff Transfer) Order 2007 (S.S.I. 2007/417)
- Seed Potatoes (Scotland) Amendment Regulations 2007 (S.S.I. 2007/418)
- Housing (Scotland) Act 2006 (Repayment Charge and Discharge) Order 2007 (S.S.I. 2007/419)
- Zoonoses (Monitoring) (Scotland) Regulations 2007 (S.S.I. 2007/420)
- Porcine Semen (Fees) (Scotland) Regulations 2007 (S.S.I. 2007/421)
- National Health Service (General Dental Services) (Scotland) Amendment (No. 2) Regulations 2007 (S.S.I. 2007/422)
- Disease Control (Interim Measures) (Scotland) Amendment (No. 3) Order 2007 (S.S.I. 2007/423)
- Food for Particular Nutritional Uses (Scotland) (Miscellaneous Amendments) Regulations 2007 (S.S.I. 2007/424)
- Civil Legal Aid (Scotland) Amendment (No. 2) Regulations 2007 (S.S.I. 2007/425)
- University of the West of Scotland Order of Council 2007 (S.S.I. 2007/426)
- Surface Waters (Shellfish) (Classification) (Scotland) Amendment Regulations 2007 (S.S.I. 2007/427)
- Import and Export Restrictions (Foot-and-Mouth Disease) (Scotland) (No. 3) Regulations 2007 (S.S.I. 2007/428)
- Foot-and-Mouth Disease (Scotland) Amendment Order 2007 (S.S.I. 2007/429)
- Custodial Sentences and Weapons (Scotland) Act 2007 (Commencement No. 1) Order 2007 (S.S.I. 2007/431)
- Shetland Islands Council (Uyea Sound, Unst) Harbour Jurisdiction Order 2007 (S.S.I. 2007/432)
- Plastic Materials and Articles in Contact with Food (Lid Gaskets) (Scotland) Regulations 2007 (S.S.I. 2007/433)
- Police and Justice Act 2006 (Commencement) (Scotland) Order 2007 (S.S.I. 2007/434)
- Natural Mineral Water, Spring Water and Bottled Drinking Water (Scotland) Regulations 2007 (S.S.I. 2007/435)
- Administrative Justice and Tribunals Council (Listed Tribunals) (Scotland) Order 2007 (S.S.I. 2007/436)
- Smoking, Health and Social Care (Scotland) Act 2005 (Variation of Age Limit for Sale of Tobacco etc. and Consequential Modifications) Order 2007 (S.S.I. 2007/437)
- Civil Legal Aid (Scotland) (Fees) Amendment (No. 3) Regulations 2007 (S.S.I. 2007/438)
- Less Favoured Area Support Scheme (Scotland) Regulations 2007 (S.S.I. 2007/439)
- Act of Sederunt (Sheriff Court Ordinary Cause, Summary Application, Summary Cause and Small Claim Rules) Amendment (Council Regulation (EC) No. 1348 of 2000 Extension to Denmark) 2007 (S.S.I. 2007/440)
- Road Traffic (Permitted Parking Area and Special Parking Area) (City of Edinburgh) Designation Amendment Order 2007 (S.S.I. 2007/446)
- Vulnerable Witnesses (Scotland) Act 2004 (Commencement No. 6, Savings and Transitional Provisions) Order 2007 (S.S.I. 2007/447)
- Scottish Commission for Human Rights Act 2006 (Commencement No. 1) Order 2007 (S.S.I. 2007/448)
- Act of Sederunt (Rules of the Court of Session Amendment No. 8) (Miscellaneous) 2007 (S.S.I. 2007/449)
- Act of Sederunt (Rules of the Court of Session Amendment No. 9) (Vulnerable Witnesses (Scotland) Act 2004) 2007 (S.S.I. 2007/450)
- Provision of School Lunches (Disapplication of the Requirement to Charge) (Scotland) Order 2007 (S.S.I. 2007/451)
- Premises Licence (Scotland) Regulations 2007 (S.S.I. 2007/452)
- Licensing (Procedure) (Scotland) Regulations 2007 (S.S.I. 2007/453)
- Licensing (Transitional and Saving Provisions) (Scotland) Order 2007 (S.S.I. 2007/454)
- Foot-and-Mouth Disease (Scotland) Amendment (No. 2) Order 2007 (S.S.I. 2007/455)
- Housing Grants (Assessment of Contributions) (Scotland) Amendment Regulations 2007 (S.S.I. 2007/456)
- Licensing (Mandatory Conditions) (Scotland) Regulations 2007 (S.S.I. 2007/457)
- Community Care (Direct Payments) (Scotland) Amendment Regulations 2007 (S.S.I. 2007/458)
- Import and Export Restrictions (Foot-and-Mouth Disease) (Scotland) (No. 4) Regulations 2007 (S.S.I. 2007/460)
- Gambling Act 2005 (Fees No. 4) (Scotland) Regulations 2007 (S.S.I. 2007/461)
- Act of Sederunt (Ordinary Cause, Summary Application, Summary Cause and Small Claim Rules) Amendment (Vulnerable Witnesses (Scotland) Act 2004) 2007 (S.S.I. 2007/463)
- Act of Sederunt (Sheriff Court Company Insolvency Rules 1986) Amendment (Vulnerable Witnesses (Scotland) Act 2004) 2007 (S.S.I. 2007/464)
- Act of Sederunt (Proceedings in the Sheriff Court under the Debtors (Scotland) Act 1987) Amendment (Vulnerable Witnesses (Scotland) Act 2004) 2007 (S.S.I. 2007/465)
- Act of Sederunt (Debt Arrangement and Attachment (Scotland) Act 2002) Amendment (Vulnerable Witnesses (Scotland) Act 2004) 2007 (S.S.I. 2007/466)
- Act of Sederunt (Sheriff Court Bankruptcy Rules 1996) Amendment (Vulnerable Witnesses (Scotland) Act 2004) 2007 (S.S.I. 2007/467)
- Act of Sederunt (Child Care and Maintenance Rules 1997) Amendment (Vulnerable Witnesses (Scotland) Act 2004) 2007 (S.S.I. 2007/468)
- Act of Sederunt (Chancery Procedure Rules 2006) Amendment (Vulnerable Witnesses (Scotland) Act 2004) 2007 (S.S.I. 2007/469)
- Contaminants in Food (Scotland) Amendment Regulations 2007 (S.S.I. 2007/470)
- Materials and Articles in Contact with Food (Scotland) Regulations 2007 (S.S.I. 2007/471)
- Licensing (Scotland) Act 2005 (Commencement No. 4) Order 2007 (S.S.I. 2007/472)
- Import and Export Restrictions (Foot-and-Mouth Disease) (Scotland) (No. 5) Regulations 2007 (S.S.I. 2007/473)
- Housing (Scotland) Act 2006 (Consequential Amendments) Order 2007 (S.S.I. 2007/475)
- Fatal Accidents and Sudden Deaths Inquiry Procedure (Scotland) Amendment Rules 2007 (S.S.I. 2007/478)
- Criminal Proceedings etc. (Reform) (Scotland) Act 2007 (Commencement No. 2 and Transitional Provisions and Savings) Order 2007 (S.S.I. 2007/479)
- District Courts and Justices of the Peace (Scotland) Order 2007 (S.S.I. 2007/480)
- Pesticides (Maximum Residue Levels in Crops, Food and Feeding Stuffs) (Scotland) Amendment (No. 3) Regulations 2007 (S.S.I. 2007/481)
- Perth Harbour Revision Order 2007 (S.S.I. 2007/482)
- Natural Mineral Water, Spring Water and Bottled Drinking Water (Scotland) (No. 2) Regulations 2007 (S.S.I. 2007/483)
- Environmental Impact Assessment (Scotland) Amendment Regulations 2007 (S.S.I. 2007/484)
- Environmental Impact Assessment and Natural Habitats (Extraction of Minerals by Marine Dredging) (Scotland) Regulations 2007 (S.S.I. 2007/485)
- Education (School and Placing Information) (Scotland) Amendment Regulations 2007 (S.S.I. 2007/487)
- Feed (Specified Undesirable Substances) (Scotland) Regulations 2007 (S.S.I. 2007/492)
- Feed (Corn Gluten Feed and Brewers Grains) (Emergency Control) (Scotland) Revocation Regulations 2007 (S.S.I. 2007/493)
- Import and Export Restrictions (Foot-and-Mouth Disease) (Scotland) (No. 6) Regulations 2007 (S.S.I. 2007/494)
- Act of Adjournal (Criminal Procedure Rules Amendment No. 5) (Miscellaneous) 2007 (S.S.I. 2007/495)
- Small Claims (Scotland) Amendment Order 2007 (S.S.I. 2007/496)
- Legal Profession and Legal Aid (Scotland) Act 2007 (Commencement No. 4) Order 2007 (S.S.I. 2007/497)
- Plant Health (Scotland) Amendment (No. 2) Order 2007 (S.S.I. 2007/498)
- Plant Health (Import Inspection Fees) (Scotland) Amendment (No. 2) Regulations 2007 (S.S.I. 2007/499)
- National Health Service (Pharmaceutical Services) (Scotland) Amendment (No. 3) Regulations 2007 (S.S.I. 2007/500)

== 501-584 ==
- The National Health Service (General Medical Services Contracts) (Scotland) Amendment (No. 3) Regulations 2007 (S.S.I. 2007/501)
- The National Health Service (Primary Medical Services Section 17C Agreements) (Scotland) Amendment (No. 3) Regulations 2007 (S.S.I. 2007/502)
- The Education (Amendments in respect of Graduate Endowment, Student Fees and Support) (Scotland) Regulations 2007 (S.S.I. 2007/503)
- The Club Gaming and Club Machine Permits (Scotland) Regulations 2007 (S.S.I. 2007/504)
- The Licensed Premises Gaming Machine Permits (Scotland) Regulations 2007 (S.S.I. 2007/505)
- The Bee Diseases and Pests Control (Scotland) Order 2007 (S.S.I. 2007/506)
- The Sheriff Courts (Scotland) Act 1971 (Privative Jurisdiction and Summary Cause) Order 2007 (S.S.I. 2007/507)
- The Remote Monitoring Requirements (Prescribed Courts) (Scotland) Revocation Regulations 2007 (S.S.I. 2007/508)
- The A9 Trunk Road (Helmsdale to Ord of Caithness Improvements - Phase 2) (Side Roads) (No. 2) Order 2007 (S.S.I. 2007/509)
- The Business Improvement Districts (Scotland) Amendment Regulations 2007 (S.S.I. 2007/510)
- Act of Adjournal (Criminal Procedure Rules Amendment No. 6) (Criminal Proceedings etc. (Reform) (Scotland) Act 2007) 2007 (S.S.I. 2007/511)
- The Water Environment and Water Services (Scotland) Act 2003 (Commencement No. 6) Order 2007 (S.S.I. 2007/512 (C. 42))
- The Licensing (Relevant Offences) (Scotland) Regulations 2007 (S.S.I. 2007/513)
- The Local Government Pension Scheme (Scotland) Amendment Regulations 2007 (S.S.I. 2007/514)
- The Public Health (Ships) (Scotland) Amendment Regulations 2007 (S.S.I. 2007/515)
- The Transport and Works (Scotland) Act 2007 (Commencement) Order 2007 (S.S.I. 2007/516 (C. 43))
- The Transport and Works (Scotland) Act 2007 (Consequential and Transitional Provisions) Order 2007 (S.S.I. 2007/517)
- The Foot-and-Mouth Disease (Export and Movement Restrictions) (Scotland) Regulations 2007 (S.S.I. 2007/518)
- The Animal Welfare Act 2006 (Commencement No. 1) (Scotland) Order 2007 (S.S.I. 2007/519 (C. 44))
- The Seed Potatoes (Fees) (Scotland) Amendment Regulations 2007 (S.S.I. 2007/520)
- The Zootechnical Standards Amendment (Scotland) Regulations 2007 (S.S.I. 2007/521)
- The Official Feed and Food Controls (Scotland) Regulations 2007 (S.S.I. 2007/522)
- The Pesticides (Maximum Residue Levels in Crops, Food and Feeding Stuffs) (Scotland) Amendment (No. 4) Regulations 2007 (S.S.I. 2007/523)
- The Fundable Bodies (Scotland) (No. 2) Order 2007 (S.S.I. 2007/524)
- The Protection of Charities Assets (Exemption) (Scotland) Amendment Order 2007 (S.S.I. 2007/525)
- The A77 Trunk Road (Dalrymple Street, Girvan) (Special Event) (Temporary Prohibition of Traffic) Order 2007 (S.S.I. 2007/526)
- The Criminal Proceedings etc. (Reform) (Scotland) Act 2007 (Commencement No. 2 and Transitional Provisions and Savings) Amendment Order 2007 (S.S.I. 2007/527)
- The Police (Promotion) (Scotland) Amendment Regulations 2007 (S.S.I. 2007/528)
- The Water Environment (Drinking Water Protected Areas) (Scotland) Order 2007 (S.S.I. 2007/529)
- The Water Environment and Water Services (Scotland) Act 2003 (Commencement No. 7) Order 2007 (S.S.I. 2007/530 (C. 45))
- The Registration Services (Fees, etc.) (Scotland) Amendment Regulations 2007 (S.S.I. 2007/531)
- Act of Sederunt (Fees of Messengers-at-Arms) 2007 (S.S.I. 2007/532)
- The Title Conditions (Scotland) Act 2003 (Conservation Bodies) Amendment Order 2007 (S.S.I. 2007/533)
- The Food Labelling (Declaration of Allergens) (Scotland) Regulations 2007 (S.S.I. 2007/534)
- The Title Conditions (Scotland) Act 2003 (Rural Housing Bodies) Amendment (No. 2) Order 2007 (S.S.I. 2007/535)
- The Seeds (Fees) (Scotland) Regulations 2007 (S.S.I. 2007/536)
- The Fishery Products (Official Controls Charges) (Scotland) Regulations 2007 (S.S.I. 2007/537)
- The Meat (Official Controls Charges) (Scotland) (No. 2) Regulations 2007 (S.S.I. 2007/538)
- Act of Sederunt (Lands Valuation Appeal Court) 2007 (S.S.I. 2007/539)
- The Criminal Proceedings etc. (Reform) (Scotland) Act 2007 (Incidental, Supplemental and Consequential Provisions) Order 2007 (S.S.I. 2007/540)
- The South West Unit Trunk Roads Area (Temporary Prohibitions of Traffic, Temporary Prohibitions of Overtaking and Temporary Speed Restrictions) (No. 11) Order 2007 (S.S.I. 2007/541)
- The South East Unit Trunk Roads Area (Temporary Prohibitions of Traffic, Temporary Prohibitions of Overtaking and Temporary Speed Restrictions) (No. 11) Order 2007 (S.S.I. 2007/542)
- The North West Unit Trunk Roads Area (Temporary Prohibitions of Overtaking and Temporary Speed Restrictions) (No. 11) Order 2007 (S.S.I. 2007/543)
- The North East Unit Trunk Roads Area (Temporary Prohibitions of Traffic, Temporary Prohibitions of Overtaking and Temporary Speed Restrictions) (No. 11) Order 2007 (S.S.I. 2007/544)
- The Licensing (Vessels etc.) (Scotland) Regulations 2007 (S.S.I. 2007/545)
- The Licensing (Mandatory Conditions No. 2) (Scotland) Regulations 2007 (S.S.I. 2007/546)
- The Glasgow City Council IFSD Tradeston Bridge Scheme 2007 Confirmation Instrument 2007 (S.S.I. 2007/547)
- Act of Sederunt (Rules of the Court of Session Amendment No. 10) (Miscellaneous) 2007 (S.S.I. 2007/548)
- The Infant Formula and Follow-on Formula (Scotland) Regulations 2007 (S.S.I. 2007/549)
- Act of Sederunt (Fees of Sheriff Officers) 2007 (S.S.I. 2007/550)
- The Budget (Scotland) Act 2007 Amendment Order 2007 (S.S.I. 2007/551)
- The Foot-and-Mouth Disease (Export and Movement Restrictions) (Scotland) (No. 2) Regulations 2007 (S.S.I. 2007/552)
- The Licensing (Fees) (Scotland) Regulations 2007 (S.S.I. 2007/553)
- The Scottish Water (Loch Horn and Loch Lunndaidh) Water Order 2007 (S.S.I. 2007/554)
- The A68 Trunk Road (Dalkeith Northern Bypass) (Temporary Prohibition of Traffic, Temporary Prohibition of Overtaking and Temporary Speed Restriction) (No. 2) Order 2007 (S.S.I. 2007/555)
- The A68 Trunk Road (Dalkeith Northern Bypass) (Temporary Prohibition of Traffic, Temporary Prohibition of Overtaking and Temporary Speed Restriction) (No. 3) Order 2007 (S.S.I. 2007/556)
- The Education (Recognised Bodies) (Scotland) Order 2007 (S.S.I. 2007/557)
- The Education (Listed Bodies) (Scotland) Order 2007 (S.S.I. 2007/558)
- The Sheep and Goats (Identification and Traceability) (Scotland) Amendment Regulations 2007 (S.S.I. 2007/559)
- The Inquiries (Scotland) Rules 2007 (S.S.I. 2007/560)
- The A702 Trunk Road (Biggar High Street, Biggar) (Special Event) (Temporary Prohibition of Traffic) Order 2007 (S.S.I. 2007/561)
- The Foot-and-Mouth Disease (Export Restrictions) (Scotland) (No. 2) Regulations 2007 (S.S.I. 2007/562)
- The Scottish Police Services Authority (Police Support Services) (Modification) Order 2007 (S.S.I. 2007/563)
- The Protection of Vulnerable Groups (Scotland) Act 2007 (Commencement No. 2) Order 2007 (S.S.I. 2007/564 (C. 46))
- The Public Contracts and Utilities Contracts (Scotland) Amendment Regulations 2007 (S.S.I. 2007/565)
- The Local Electoral Administration and Registration Services (Scotland) Act 2006 (Commencement No. 3 and Transitional Provision) Order 2007 (S.S.I. 2007/566 (C. 47))
- The Registration of Births, Still-births, Deaths and Marriages (Prescription of Forms) (Scotland) Amendment Regulations 2007 (S.S.I. 2007/567)
- The Crofting Reform etc. Act 2007 (Commencement No. 2) Order 2007 (S.S.I. 2007/568 (C. 48))
- The Transport and Works (Scotland) Act 2007 (Consents under Enactments) Regulations 2007 (S.S.I. 2007/569)
- The Transport and Works (Scotland) Act 2007 (Applications and Objections Procedure) Rules 2007 (S.S.I. 2007/570)
- The Transport and Works (Scotland) Act 2007 (Inquiries and Hearings Procedure) Rules 2007 (S.S.I. 2007/571)
- The A83 Trunk Road (Inveraray) (Temporary Clearway) Order 2007 (S.S.I. 2007/572)
- The Licensing (Transitional and Saving Provisions) (Scotland) Amendment Order 2007 (S.S.I. 2007/573)
- The Gambling Act 2005 (Review of Premises Licences) (Scotland) Amendment Regulations 2007 (S.S.I. 2007/574)
- The Housing (Scotland) Act 2006 (Penalty Charge) Regulations 2007 (S.S.I. 2007/575)
- The Scottish Police Services Authority (Staff Transfer) (No. 2) Order 2007 (S.S.I. 2007/576)
- The Zoonoses and Animal By-Products (Fees) (Scotland) Regulations 2007 (S.S.I. 2007/577)
- The North East Unit Trunk Roads Area (Temporary Prohibitions of Traffic, Temporary Prohibitions of Overtaking and Temporary Speed Restrictions) (No. 12) Order 2007 (S.S.I. 2007/578)
- The North West Unit Trunk Roads Area (Temporary Prohibitions of Traffic, Temporary Prohibitions of Overtaking and Temporary Speed Restrictions) (No. 12) Order 2007 (S.S.I. 2007/579)
- The South East Unit Trunk Roads Area (Temporary Prohibitions of Traffic, Temporary Prohibitions of Overtaking and Temporary Speed Restrictions) (No. 12) Order 2007 (S.S.I. 2007/580)
- The South West Unit Trunk Roads Area (Temporary Prohibitions of Traffic, Temporary Prohibitions of Overtaking and Temporary Speed Restrictions) (No.12) Order 2007 (S.S.I. 2007/581)
- The A9 Trunk Road (Highland Lights, Kessock Bridge) (Special Event) (Temporary Prohibition of Traffic) Order 2007 (S.S.I. 2007/582)
- The A9 Trunk Road (Highland Lights, Kessock Bridge) (Special Event) (Temporary Restriction of Speed) Order 2007 (S.S.I. 2007/583)
- The A7 Trunk Road (Auchenrivock Improvement) (Temporary Prohibition of Traffic, Temporary Prohibition of Overtaking and Temporary Speed Restriction) Order 2007 (S.S.I. 2007/584)
