= Statutory undertaker =

In the United Kingdom, statutory undertakers are companies and agencies given general licence to carry out certain development and highways works. Generally these are utilities and telecoms companies or nationalised companies such as Network Rail. Those relating to transport that have a duty through enactment to railways, canals and roads are defined under the Environmental Protection Act 1990 (s. 98.6).

In recognition of their special status, statutory undertakers have privileges regarding development and highways access. They are often exempt from planning permission for small works through the Town and Country Planning (General Permitted Development) (England) Order 2015 (SI 2015/596). They may undertake certain works on public highways under the street works sections of New Roads and Street Works Act 1991 (c. 22) (sections 48 to 106 in England and Wales, and the next set of sections in Scotland). They must inform the local council of minor-scale planned works, giving notice, often less than seven days; however considerably greater in the case of full road closures and closures of trunk roads, bridges and other key infrastructure.

Before the 1991 deregulation the number of statutory undertakers was low – made up local and regional, gas, water and electricity boards and national telecoms providers. Since this date, it has increased. In most areas cable telecommunications companies and appointed contractors on behalf of local authorities have been granted a licence. This tends to be broadly empowering yet is always subject to the requirements of the 1991 Act. Some have been granted a licence by the UK government departments responsible for electronic communications and transport.

== New Roads and Street Works Act 1991 ==
New Roads and Street Works Act 1991 (Note: Section 171.)
- Act of Parliament
- Parliament of the United Kingdom
- Long title: An Act to amend the law relating to roads so as to enable new roads to be provided by new means; to make new provision with respect to street works and, in Scotland, road works; and for connected purposes.
- Citation: 1991 c. 22
- Territorial extent: England and Wales (in part); Scotland (in part); Northern Ireland (in part); (Note: Section 169.)

Dates
- Royal assent: 27 June 1991
- Commencement: various (Note: Section 170.)
Other legislation
Amends	London Government Act 1963; Restrictive Trade Practices Act 1976; Civil Liability (Contribution) Act 1978; Water (Scotland) Act 1980; Road Traffic Regulation Act 1984
Repeals/revokes	Public Utilities Street Works Act 1950
Amended by	Water Consolidation (Consequential Provisions) Act 1991; Statute Law (Repeals) Act 1993; Gas Act 1995; Planning (Consequential Provisions) (Scotland) Act 1997; Planning Act 2008; Infrastructure Act 2015; Planning and Infrastructure Act 2025

Status: Amended

Text of statute as originally enacted

Text of the New Roads and Street Works Act 1991 as in force today (including any amendments) within the United Kingdom, from legislation.gov.uk.

The New Roads and Street Works Act 1991 (c. 22) consists of 171 sections.

Part	Notable effects
Sections 1 to 26 form Part I: New Roads in England and Wales	Concession of roads (to be typically leased); Toll roads Regulation of special roads Modifications to the Highways Act 1980 (etc.)
Sections 27 to 47 form Part II: New Roads in Scotland	Toll roads Regulation of special roads Modifications to the Roads (Scotland) Act 1984
Sections 48 to 106 form Part III: Street works in England and Wales	Street works licences Register; Advance notice rules The duty to co-ordinate The duty of undertakers to co-operate Streets subject to special controls, including s.64: Traffic-sensitive streets General requirements as to execution of street works including safety and duty to avoid unnecessary delay Reinstatement; Charges, fees and contributions payable by undertakers Duties and liabilities of undertakers with respect to apparatus (most utilities and conduits) and sharing of cost of necessary measures Provisions with respect to particular authorities and undertakings Power of street authority or district council to do street works Offences; Recovery of costs or expenses Service of notices and other documents Reckoning of periods. Arbitration; Agreements inconsistent with Part III; Effect on certain and all other special enactments or instruments Former controlled land Meanings and index of expressions
Sections 107 to 165 form Part IV: Road works in Scotland	Alike to Part III except: s.120 to 123 help to govern Protected Roads, their designation, and roads with special engineering difficulties
Sections 166 to 171 form Part V: General	Offences by bodies corporate or Scottish partnerships. Crown application. Minor and consequential amendments and repeals. Extent. Commencement. Short title.

== See also ==
- Town and country planning in the United Kingdom
- Land use planning
