= Planning and Infrastructure Act 2025 =

UK law reforming legislation

Planning and Infrastructure Act 2025 (Note: Section 119.)
- Act of Parliament
- Parliament of the United Kingdom
- Long title: An Act to make provision about infrastructure; to make provision about town and country planning; to make provision for a scheme, administered by Natural England, for a nature restoration levy payable by developers; to make provision about development corporations; to make provision about the compulsory purchase of land; to make provision about environmental outcomes reports; and for connected purposes.
- Citation: 2025 c. 34
- Introduced by: Angela Rayner MP (Commons); Baroness Taylor of Stevenage (Lords)
- Territorial extent: England and Wales; Scotland (in part); Northern Ireland (in part); (Note: Section 117.)

Dates
- Royal assent: 18 December 2025
- Commencement: Various (Note: Section 118.)
Other legislation
Amends	Land Compensation Act 1961; Harbours Act 1964; Forestry Act 1967; Land Compensation Act 1973; Local Government, Planning and Land Act 1980; Highways Act 1980; Compulsory Purchase (Vesting Declarations) Act 1981; Acquisition of Land Act 1981; Wildlife and Countryside Act 1981; Senior Courts Act 1981; New Towns Act 1981; Electricity Act 1989; Town and Country Planning Act 1990; Planning (Listed Buildings and Conservation Areas) Act 1990; New Roads and Street Works Act 1991; Transport and Works Act 1992; Protection of Badgers Act 1992; Town and Country Planning (Scotland) Act 1997; Greater London Authority Act 1999; Planning and Compulsory Purchase Act 2004; Environmental Assessment of Plans and Programmes Regulations 2004; Natural Environment and Rural Communities Act 2006; Planning Act 2008; Marine and Coastal Access Act 2009; Localism Act 2011; Neighbourhood Planning Act 2017; Habitats Regulations 2017; Conservation of Habitats and Species Regulations 2017; Automated and Electric Vehicles Act 2018; Energy Act 2023; Levelling-up and Regeneration Act 2023; Historic Environment (Wales) Act 2023

Status: Current legislation

History of passage through Parliament

Text of statute as originally enacted

Revised text of statute as amended

The Planning and Infrastructure Act 2025 is an act of the Parliament of the United Kingdom significantly changing planning law in the United Kingdom.

The act makes substantial amendments to the Town and Country Planning Act 1990. The act allows the Secretary of State for Housing, Communities and Local Government to require local authorities to delegate planning functions to planning officers rather than councillors, makes Compulsory Purchase by public bodies easier, establishes a Nature Restoration Fund, and removes requirements for public consultation before applications for 'nationally significant infrastructure projects' are submitted.

== Provisions ==
For 'nationally significant infrastructure projects', the legislation removes the requirement to "consult statutory consultees, landowners, local authorities and the community before submitting their application".

The legislation reduces the number of available legal challenges to planning decisions from three to at most two.

The legislation moves more decisions away from councillors and towards council officers by allowing the Secretary of State for Housing, Communities and Local Government to make regulations requiring local authorities to delegate planning functions to planning officers (not consisting of councillors, unlike planning committees). It also requires all those making planning decisions to attend regulated training.

The act establishes the Nature Restoration Fund managed by Natural England. The legislation allows developers to contribute to the fund as part of meeting their environmental obligations.

The act makes it easier for local and central government bodies to make Compulsory Purchase orders, and reduces associated compensatory loss payments.

== Implementation ==
On the 1 June 2026 the Government published its statutory guidance on 'Planning Committees and the National Scheme of Delegation of Planning Functions' following public consultation. The implementation of the delegation scheme was delayed to the 31 October 2026, with a review by October 2028.

From 31 October the statutory guidance states that if local authorities "do not comply with the regulations from the date they come into force (31 October 2026) and their planning committees make decisions on applications which must be delegated to officers, those decisions may be subject to judicial review by anyone aggrieved by the decision".

In February 2026, the government consulted on areas for strategic planning authorities, that will each produce a 'spatial development strategy'.

== Reception ==
The legislation had qualified support from the London Councils, and the County Councils Network local authority groups. London Councils said they were "supportive of reforms to speed up the delivery of the homes and jobs Londoners need" including decision delegation, while the County Councils Network said they "support the aims of the Bill to speed up infrastructure delivery, improve the planning process and make it easier for development to be delivered through reforms to development corporations and compulsory purchase" while opposing the bill's "national scheme of delegation that will ultimately remove decision-making powers from councillors."

The legislation was described by Wildlife Trusts as a "trojan horse", describing it as giving developers "cash to trash" green spaces and a "licence to destroy" nature.

The Office for Environmental Protection criticised certain parts as weakening environmental protections, but supported most of the bill.

Froglife criticized the bill for reducing environmental protections and continuing habitat loss in the UK.

The legislation was supported by the Nuclear Industry Association, Energy UK, and the CBI. The CBI said that the bill "represents progress in reforming the planning system and moves the dial on delivering critical national infrastructure".

Age UK said the legislation "presents an opportunity to help rectify the shortage of housing suitable for an ageing population."
