= Strategic development planning authority =

Authority in Scotland

A strategic development planning authority was a partnership established under the Planning etc. (Scotland) Act 2006 to prepare and keep under review a strategic development plan for its area.

There were four strategic development planning authorities (SDPAs) in Scotland, covering the four largest city regions - Aberdeen, Dundee-Perth, Edinburgh and Glasgow. Some local authorities were excluded from these authorities.

Each SDPA is made up of between two and eight planning authorities, although the area covered by its strategic development plan does not always cover this full area.

Each SDPA was required to publish a development plan scheme on an annual basis which sets out its timetable for the preparation of its strategic development plan and identify how and when it will consult and engage with the community and interested parties. Detail regarding the preparation of development plan schemes and strategic development plans are contained in regulations and a circular.

They were abolished by the Planning (Scotland) Act 2019.

== See also ==
- Corporate joint committee – equivalent body in Wales
- Strategic authority – equivalent body in England
