= Forestry Act 1967 =

Act of the Parliament of the United Kingdom

Forestry Act 1967 (Note: Section 51.)
- Act of Parliament
- Parliament of the United Kingdom
- Long title: An Act to consolidate the Forestry Acts 1919 to 1963 with corrections and improvements made under the Consolidation of Enactments (Procedure) Act 1949.
- Citation: 1967 c. 10
- Territorial extent: England and Wales; Scotland; (Note: Section 51.)

Dates
- Royal assent: 22 March 1967
- Commencement: 22 March 1967 (Note: The Acts of Parliament (Commencement) Act 1793.)
- Repealed: Scotland: 1 April 2019 (Note: The Forestry and Land Management (Scotland) Act 2018 (Commencement, Transitional and Saving Provisions) Regulations 2019 as amended by the Forestry and Land Management (Scotland) Act 2018 (Consequential, Saving and Transitional Provisions) Regulations 2021.)
Other legislation
Amends	See § Repealed enactments
Repeals/revokes	See § Repealed enactments
Amended by	Countryside (Scotland) Act 1967; Countryside Act 1968; London Government Order 1970; Superannuation Act 1972; Finance Act 1972; Criminal Justice Act 1972; Statute Law (Repeals) Act 1974; Local Authorities etc. (Miscellaneous Provision) (No. 2) Order 1974; Forestry Act 1979; Forestry Act 1981; Forestry Act 1986; Gas Act 1986; Electricity Act 1989; Planning (Consequential Provisions) Act 1990; Forestry Act 1991; Trusts of Land and Appointment of Trustees Act 1996; Scotland Act 1998 (Cross-Border Public Authorities) (Adaptation of Functions etc.) Order 1999; Countryside and Rights of Way Act 2000; Abolition of Feudal Tenure etc. (Scotland) Act 2000; Scotland Act 1998 (Cross-Border Public Authorities) (Forestry Commissioners) Order 2000; Ministry of Agriculture, Fisheries and Food (Dissolution) Order 2002; Regulatory Reform (Forestry) Order 2006; Church of England (Miscellaneous Provisions) Measure 2006; Planning Act 2008; Public Services Reform (Scotland) Act 2010; Postal Services Act 2011; Natural Resources Body for Wales (Functions) Order 2013; Public Bodies (Abolition of the Home Grown Timber Advisory Committee) Order 2015; Housing and Planning Act 2016 (Compulsory Purchase) (Corresponding Amendments) Regulations 2017; Forestry and Land Management (Scotland) Act 2018; Church Property Measure 2018; Forestry and Land Management (Scotland) Act 2018 (Consequential Provisions and Modifications) Order 2019; Environment Act 2021; Planning and Infrastructure Act 2025
Repealed by	Scotland: Forestry and Land Management (Scotland) Act 2018
Relates to	Plant Health Act 1967

Status: Partially repealed

Text of statute as originally enacted

Revised text of statute as amended

Text of the Forestry Act 1967 as in force today (including any amendments) within the United Kingdom, from legislation.gov.uk.

The Forestry Act 1967 (c. 10) is an act of the Parliament of the United Kingdom that consolidated enactments related to forestry in Great Britain.

== Provisions ==
=== Repealed enactments ===
Section 50 of the act repealed 15 enactments, listed in part I of the seventh schedule to the act.

Citation	Short title	Extent of repeal
52 & 53 Vict. c. 30	Board of Agriculture Act 1889	In section 2(2) and (3), the words "and forestry" and "or forestry", wherever occurring. In section 4, the words "or forestry".
3 Edw. 7. c. 31	Board of Agriculture and Fisheries Act 1903	In section 1(3) the words "or forestry".
1 & 2 Geo. 5. c. 49	Small Landholders (Scotland) Act 1911	In section 4(2), (3) and (4), the word "forestry", wherever occurring.
9 & 10 Geo. 5. c. 58	Forestry Act 1919	The whole act except so much of section 3(2) as transfers to the Commissioners the power of making orders under the Destructive Insects and Pests Acts 1877 to 1927.
13 & 14 Geo. 5. c. 21	Forestry (Transfer of Woods) Act 1923	The whole act.
17 Geo. 5. c. 6	Forestry Act 1927	The whole act.
1 & 2 Geo. 6. c. 13	Superannuation (Various Services) Act 1938	The entries in all three columns of the Schedule relating to the Forestry (Transfer of Woods) Act 1923 and the Forestry Act 1945.
8 & 9 Geo. 6. c. 35	Forestry Act 1945	The whole act.
10 & 11 Geo. 6. c. 21	Forestry Act 1947	The whole act.
12 & 13 Geo. 6. c. 44	Superannuation Act 1949	Section 52(1), so far as applying to the superannuation of Forestry Commissioners and officers employed by the Commissioners.
14 & 15 Geo. 6. c. 61	Forestry Act 1951	The whole act.
9 & 10 Eliz. 2. c. 55	Crown Estate Act 1961	Section 8(1).
10 & 11 Eliz. 2. c. 38	Town and Country Planning Act 1962	In section 29(8), paragraph (a).
1963 c. 23	Forestry (Sale of Land) (Scotland) Act 1963	The whole act.
1964 c. 83	New Forest Act 1964	Section 13.

== Subsequent developments ==
The act has been amended on several occasions, including by the Forestry Act 1981 (c. 39), which amended the Commissioners' powers, and the Countryside and Rights of Way Act 2000 (c. 37), which inserted provisions in section 9(6) of the act. The Environment Act 2021 (c. 26) inserted new provisions relating to restocking orders. The Planning and Infrastructure Act 2025 inserted new sections 3A to 3C regarding renewable electricity projects on Commissioners' forestry land in England.

The provisions of the act applying to Scotland were repealed by the Forestry and Land Management (Scotland) Act 2018 (asp 8), which came into force on 1 April 2019. The act continues in force in England and Wales.
