= Planning (Listed Buildings and Conservation Areas) Act 1990 =

Act of the Parliament of the United Kingdom

Planning (Listed Buildings and Conservation Areas) Act 1990 (Note: Section 94(1).)
- Act of Parliament
- Parliament of the United Kingdom
- Long title: An Act to consolidate certain enactments relating to special controls in respect of buildings and areas of special architectural or historic interest with amendments to give effect to recommendations of the Law Commission.
- Citation: 1990 c. 9
- Territorial extent: England and Wales (Note: Section 94(3).)

Dates
- Royal assent: 24 May 1990
- Commencement: 24 August 1990 (Note: Section 94(2).)

Other legislation
- Amends: Planning (Consequential Provisions) Act 1990
- Amended by: Local Government (Wales) Act 1994; Coal Industry Act 1994; Environment Act 1995; Gas Act 1995; Housing Act 1996; Environment Act 1995 (Consequential Amendments) Regulations 1996; Secretary of State for the Environment, Transport and the Regions Order 1997; Communications Act 2003; Courts Act 2003; Town and Country Planning (Electronic Communications) (England) Order 2003; Planning and Compulsory Purchase Act 2004; Town and Country Planning (Electronic Communications) (Wales) (No. 1) Order 2004; Constitutional Reform Act 2005; Church of England (Miscellaneous Provisions) Measure 2006; Government of Wales Act 2006; Historic Buildings Council for Wales (Abolition) Order 2006; Planning and Compulsory Purchase Act 2004 (Commencement No. 9 and Consequential Provisions) Order 2006; Secretary of State for Communities and Local Government Order 2006; Housing and Regeneration Act 2008; Planning Act 2008; Transfer of Tribunal Functions (Lands Tribunal and Miscellaneous Amendments) Order 2009; Postal Services Act 2011; Localism Act 2011; Enterprise and Regulatory Reform Act 2013; Natural Resources Body for Wales (Functions) Order 2013; Church of England (Miscellaneous Provisions) Measure 2014; Town and Country Planning (Determination of Procedure) (Wales) Order 2014; Criminal Justice and Courts Act 2015; Legal Aid, Sentencing and Punishment of Offenders Act 2012 (Fines on Summary Conviction) Regulations 2015; Planning (Wales) Act 2015; Historic Environment (Wales) Act 2016; Housing and Planning Act 2016; Ecclesiastical Jurisdiction and Care of Churches Measure 2018; Secretaries of State for Health and Social Care and for Housing, Communities and Local Government and Transfer of Functions (Commonhold Land) Order 2018; Public Services Ombudsman (Wales) Act 2019; Business and Planning Act 2020; Transfer of Functions (Secretary of State for Levelling Up, Housing and Communities) Order 2021; Historic Environment (Wales) Act 2023; Levelling-up and Regeneration Act 2023; Transfer of Functions (Secretary of State for Housing, Communities and Local Government) Order 2024; Historic Environment (Wales) Act 2023 (Consequential Provision) (Primary Legislation) Regulations 2024; Planning and Infrastructure Act 2025
- Relates to: Town and Country Planning Act 1990; Planning (Hazardous Substances) Act 1990; Planning (Consequential Provisions) Act 1990

Status: Amended

Text of statute as originally enacted

Revised text of statute as amended

Text of the Planning (Listed Buildings and Conservation Areas) Act 1990 as in force today (including any amendments) within the United Kingdom, from legislation.gov.uk.

The Planning (Listed Buildings and Conservation Areas) Act 1990 (c. 9) is an act of the Parliament of the United Kingdom that altered the laws on granting of planning permission for building works, notably including those of the listed building system in England and Wales.

The enactments consolidated by the act were repealed by section 4 of, and schedule 1 to, the Planning (Consequential Provisions) Act 1990.

The act no longer has effect in Wales, its provisions having been repealed and replaced there by the Historic Environment (Wales) Act 2023.

== Secondary legislation ==
Planning (Listed Buildings and Conservation Areas) Regulations 1990
- Statutory Instrument
- Parliament of the United Kingdom
- Citation: SI 1990/1519

Dates
- Made: 20 July 1990
- Laid before Parliament: 30 July 1990
- Commencement: 24 August 1990

Other legislation
- Made under: Planning (Listed Buildings and Conservation Areas) Act 1990
- Amended by: Planning (Listed Buildings and Conservation Areas) (Amendment No. 2) England) Regulations 2009

Text of the Planning (Listed Buildings and Conservation Areas) Regulations 1990 as in force today (including any amendments) within the United Kingdom, from legislation.gov.uk.

Planning (Listed Buildings and Conservation Areas) (Amendment No. 2) England) Regulations 2009
- Statutory Instrument
- Parliament of the United Kingdom
- Citation: SI 2009/2711

Dates
- Made: 6 October 2009
- Laid before Parliament: 8 October 2009
- Commencement: 2 November 2009

Other legislation
- Amends: Planning (Listed Buildings and Conservation Areas) (England) Regulations 1990
- Made under: Planning (Listed Buildings and Conservation Areas) Act 1990

Text of the Planning (Listed Buildings and Conservation Areas) (Amendment No. 2) England) Regulations 2009 as in force today (including any amendments) within the United Kingdom, from legislation.gov.uk.

The Planning (Listed Buildings and Conservation Areas) (Amendment No. 2) England) Regulations 2009 (SI 2009/2711) were made on 6 October 2009 and came into force on 2 November 2009. They amend the Planning (Listed Buildings and Conservation Areas) Regulations 1990 (SI 1990/1519) as amended, by substituting schedule 4 of the 1990 regulations (notices that a building has become listed or that a building has ceased to be listed), to reflect the fact that Historic England now compiles lists of buildings of special architectural or historic interest and the Secretary of State is responsible for approving them.
