= Development management (Scotland) =

Development Management is the name given to the element of Scotland's system of town and country planning, through which national government, local government and national park authorities (the 'Planning Authority') regulate land-use and development.

In its simplest form, development management constitutes the assessing and determining of applications for planning permission; however on a more strategic level, it is involved in the spatial planning and development of communities and land. At present, it relies on a "plan-led system", whereby Development Plans (formerly Structure and Local but Strategic Development Plans and Local Development Plans under the 2006 Act) are formed following public consultation. Planning applications are then granted or refused with reference to the Development Plan as a material consideration.

== Sources ==
- "Town and Country Planning (Scotland) Act 1997". opsi.gov.uk.
- "Planning etc. (Scotland) act 2006". opsi.gov.uk.

== See also ==
- Development control in the United Kingdom
- Town and Country Planning (Scotland) Act 1997
- Town and country planning in the United Kingdom
