= Planning (Hazardous Substances) Act 1990 =

Act of the Parliament of the United Kingdom

Planning (Hazardous Substances) Act 1990 (Note: Section 41(1).)
- Act of Parliament
- Parliament of the United Kingdom
- Long title: An Act to consolidate certain enactments relating to special controls in respect of hazardous substances with amendments to give effect to recommendations of the Law Commission.
- Citation: 1990 c. 10
- Territorial extent: England and Wales (Note: Section 41(4).)

Dates
- Royal assent: 24 May 1990
- Commencement: various (Note: Section 41(2)–(3).)
Other legislation
Amended by	Local Government (Wales) Act 1994; Environment Act 1995; Gas Act 1995; Environment Act 1995 (Consequential Amendments) Regulations 1996; Secretary of State for the Environment, Transport and the Regions Order 1997; Planning (Control of Major-Accident Hazards) Regulations 1999; Planning and Compulsory Purchase Act 2004; Church of England (Miscellaneous Provisions) Measure 2006; Government of Wales Act 2006; Secretary of State for Communities and Local Government Order 2006; Greater London Authority Act 2007; Statute Law (Repeals) Act 2008; Housing and Regeneration Act 2008; Planning Act 2008; Legislative Reform (Health and Safety Executive) Order 2008; Companies Act 2006 (Consequential Amendments, Transitional Provisions and Savings) Order 2009; Postal Services Act 2011; Localism Act 2011; Natural Resources Body for Wales (Functions) Order 2013; Energy Act 2013 (Office for Nuclear Regulation) (Consequential Amendments, Transitional Provisions and Savings) Order 2014; Town and Country Planning (Determination of Procedure) (Wales) Order 2014; Criminal Justice and Courts Act 2015; Planning (Wales) Act 2015; Legal Aid, Sentencing and Punishment of Offenders Act 2012 (Fines on Summary Conviction) Regulations 2015; Housing and Planning Act 2016 (Permission in Principle etc) (Miscellaneous Amendments) (England) Regulations 2017; Planning (Hazardous Substances) (Determination of Procedure) (Wales) Order 2017; Secretaries of State for Health and Social Care and for Housing, Communities and Local Government and Transfer of Functions (Commonhold Land) Order 2018; Business and Planning Act 2020; Transfer of Functions (Secretary of State for Levelling Up, Housing and Communities) Order 2021; Levelling-up and Regeneration Act 2023; Infrastructure (Wales) Act 2024; Transfer of Functions (Secretary of State for Housing, Communities and Local Government) Order 2024; Legislation (Procedure, Publication and Repeals) (Wales) Act 2025; Infrastructure (Wales) Act 2024 (Consequential Amendments) Order 2025; Planning (Consequential Provisions) (Wales) Act 2026; English Devolution and Community Empowerment Act 2026
Relates to	Town and Country Planning Act 1990; Planning (Listed Buildings and Conservation Areas) Act 1990; Planning (Consequential Provisions) Act 1990

Status: Amended

Text of statute as originally enacted

Revised text of statute as amended

Text of the Planning (Hazardous Substances) Act 1990 as in force today (including any amendments) within the United Kingdom, from legislation.gov.uk.

The Planning (Hazardous Substances) Act 1990 (c. 10) is an act of the Parliament of the United Kingdom to consolidate certain enactments relating to special controls in respect of hazardous substances with amendments to give effect to recommendations of the Law Commission.

The enactments consolidated by the act were repealed by section 4 of, and schedule 1 to, the Planning (Consequential Provisions) Act 1990 (c. 11).

== Bibliography ==
- "Planning (Hazardous Substances) Act 1990". Scottish Current Law Statutes Annotated 1990. Sweet & Maxwell. London. W Green & Son. Edinburgh. 1990. Volume 2. Chapter 10.
- "Planning (Hazardous Substances) Act 1990". Halsbury's Statutes of England and Wales. Fourth Edition. 2010 Reissue. LexisNexis. Volume 34(2). Page 630 et seq.
- "The Planning (Hazardous Substances) Act 1990". Halsbury's Statutes of England. Third Edition. Butterworths. London. 1991. Binder 60: Continuation Binder 1990. Page 853 et seq.
- Brian Greenwood (ed). "Planning (Hazardous Substances) Act 1990". Butterworths Planning Law Handbook. Third Edition. Butterworths. London, Dublin and Edinburgh. 1992. Page 415 et seq. Paragraph [467] et seq.
- Halsbury's Laws of England. Fourth Edition. Reissue. LexisNexis Butterworths. 2005. Volume 46(3). Title "Town and Country Planning". Passim.
- J Cameron Blackhall. "Hazardous Substances". Planning Law & Practice. Cavendish Publishing Limited. Third Edition. 2005. Paragraph 30.5 at page 391 et seq. Second Edition. 2000. Paragraph 31.5 at page 430 et seq.
- Victor Moore and Michael Purdue. A Practical Approach to Planning Law. Twelfth Edition. Oxford University Press. 2012. Paragraphs 1.21, 1.22, 10.05, 10.47, 17.01 and 17.37.
- Richard Harwood. Planning Enforcement. Second Edition. Bloomsbury Professional. 2013. Paragraphs 1.09, 5.11, 5.20, 5.41, 9.20, 14.02, 14.06, 14.16, 14.19, 20.01, 20.02, 20.04 to 20.07, 20.09.
- Chris Miller (ed). Planning and Environmental Protection: A Review of Law and Policy. Hart Publishing. Oxford. Portland, Oregon. 2001. Pages 69 and 71 and see passim for the "P(HS) legislation" (this Act and the subordinate legislation made under it).
