= Infrastructure Planning Commission =

The Infrastructure Planning Commission (IPC) was a non-departmental public body responsible for the examining and, in certain circumstances, the decision-making body for proposed nationally significant infrastructure projects in England and Wales. Created in 2008, the IPC's function has been performed within the Planning Inspectorate since 1 April 2012.

== History ==
The IPC was established by the Planning Act 2008 and began operating on 1 October 2009. The IPC provided advice and guidance about the application process for infrastructure projects until its power to receive, accept and examine applications for development consent came into force on 1 March 2010.

It was abolished by the Coalition Government's Localism Act 2011 which transferred its decision-making powers for all cases to the relevant Secretary of State. The act gained royal assent on 15 November 2011 and from 1 April 2012, the acceptance and examination of applications for development consent is dealt with by a new Infrastructure Planning Unit within the Planning Inspectorate.

== Function ==
The IPC examined accepted applications for development consent for proposed projects that meet certain thresholds, as set out in Part 3 of the 2008 Act. In England, its remit covered applications for proposed energy, transport, water, waste water and waste infrastructure projects. Its remit in Wales only covered proposed energy and harbour projects.

The framework for decision-making over applications for development consent was set out in National Policy Statements (NPS). Following the designation of a NPS, the 2008 act provided jurisdiction for the IPC to decide over applications in a specific field. While an NPS is in draft form, the IPC acted as examining authority and provided a report of recommendation to the relevant Secretary of State who was to take the decision.

The chairperson was Sir Michael Pitt and the chief executive officer John Saunders.

== See also ==
- Infrastructure UK
