= Outline planning permission =

Outline Planning Permission is an initial form of planning permission in English land law, whereby the applicant gains feedback as regards the scale and nature of a proposed development from the local planning authority. It enables the applicant to see whether a proposal is likely to be accepted before going to the expense of drawing up a detailed planning application.

Outline Planning Permission was introduced with the Town and Country Planning Act 1990. It allows for certain "reserved matters" to be deferred until the submission of one or more Detailed Planning Permission applications, which if successful will yield Full Planning Consent.

== Reserved Matters ==
These reserved matters may include:

- Appearance - how the building or place will look, including externally
- Means of access - routes to and within the site, including how they link up to pathways roads and outside the site
- Landscaping - the alterations or protection of the amenities of the site and the surrounding area, perhaps including planting trees or hedges as a screen
- Layout - overview of buildings, routes and open spaces both within and neighbouring the development
- Some elements of scale - this can include the height, width and length of each proposed building
