= Grampian condition =

Planning condition in Scotland

The Grampian condition is a facet of planning Scottish case law established by Grampian Regional Council v City of Aberdeen District Council (1984) 47 P&CR 633. The term is commonly also used in England and Wales.

A "Grampian condition" is a planning condition attached to a decision notice that prevents the start of a development until off-site works have been completed on land not controlled by the applicant.

== Sources ==
- "Publications". Scottish Government.

== See also ==
- Scots law
- Town and Country Planning Act 1990
- Town & Country Planning (Scotland) Act 1997
