= Localism Act 2011 =

Legislation concerning English local government

Localism Act 2011 (Note: Section 241.)
- Act of Parliament
- Parliament of the United Kingdom
- Long title: An Act to make provision about the functions and procedures of local and certain other authorities; to make provision about the functions of the Commission for Local Administration in England; to enable the recovery of financial sanctions imposed by the Court of Justice of the European Union on the United Kingdom from local and public authorities; to make provision about local government finance; to make provision about town and country planning, the Community Infrastructure Levy and the authorisation of nationally significant infrastructure projects; to make provision about social and other housing; to make provision about regeneration in London; and for connected purposes.
- Citation: 2011 c. 20
- Introduced by: Eric Pickles MP, Secretary of State for Communities and Local Government (Commons); Baroness Hanham (Lords)
- Territorial extent: England and Wales; Scotland (in part); Northern Ireland (in part); (Note: Section 239.)

Dates
- Royal assent: 15 November 2011
- Commencement: Various (Note: Section 240.)
Other legislation
Amends	Land Compensation Act 1961; House of Commons Disqualification Act 1975; Rent Act 1977; Protection from Eviction Act 1977; Town and Country Planning Act 1990; Planning (Listed Buildings and Conservation Areas) Act 1990; Planning (Hazardous Substances) Act 1990; Water Industry Act 1991; Water Resources Act 1991; Social Security Administration Act 1992; Police Act 1996; Terrorism Act 2000; Land Registration Act 2002; Public Audit (Wales) Act 2004; Housing Act 2004; National Health Service Act 2006; Planning Act 2008
Repeals/revokes	London Development Agency Act 2003
Amended by	Co-operative and Community Benefit Societies Act 2014; Infrastructure Act 2015; Cities and Local Government Devolution Act 2016; Policing and Crime Act 2017; Wales Act 2017; Sentencing Act 2020; Social Housing (Regulation) Act 2023; Non-Domestic Rating Act 2023; Renters' Rights Act 2025; Planning and Infrastructure Act 2025

Status: Amended

History of passage through Parliament

Text of statute as originally enacted

Revised text of statute as amended

The Localism Act 2011 (c. 20) is an act of the Parliament of the United Kingdom that changes the powers of local government in England. The aim of the act is to facilitate the devolution of decision-making powers from central government control to individuals and communities. The measures affected by the act include an increase in the number of elected mayors, referendums and the "Local authority’s general power of competence" (Part 1, chapter 1) which states "A local authority has power to do anything that individuals generally may do".

Although the act was envisaged as having the potential to bring about wide-scale decentralisation, there have been few significant examples of its implementation. One notable outcome of the act has been the further transfer of powers of combined authorities formed by local authorities pooling their powers of transport and economy and gaining certain functions delegated from central government. As a result, there have been calls for legislation to bring about further devolution to the Core Cities Group, leading to the introduction of the Cities and Local Government Devolution Act 2016.

== Timetable ==
The bill was introduced by the Secretary of State for Communities and Local Government, Eric Pickles, and given its first reading on 13 December 2010. The bill completed the third reading in the House of Lords on 31 October 2011. The bill received royal assent on 15 November 2011.

The main section of the act is split into ten parts (totalling 240 pages), and this is followed by 25 further schedules (an additional 243 pages). A short summary of the main points is available. Sections of the act involving new regulations are straightforward but the act also includes many detailed modifications of existing acts, such as the Town and Country Planning Act 1990 and the Planning Act 2008.

== Contents ==
=== Part 1: Local government ===
This is the major part of the act, and the one which extends the power of all local authorities, from parish and community councils to county councils, to 'do anything that individuals generally may do', as long as that is not limited by some other act. Sections 27 to 36 deal with the standards expected of council members and with the keeping of public registers of interests. In an important change, it specifically empowers members to take part in a decision on a matter after previously having expressed views on it, without the risk the decision being invalid due to bias or predetermination.

=== Parts 2 and 3: EU financial sanctions ===
These sections give ministers the right to require public authorities to pay fines to the European Union resulting from an infraction of European Union law.

=== Part 4: Non-domestic rates ===
Part 4 amended the beneficiaries to whom discretionary relief on non-domestic rates (i.e. business rates) could be granted by a council.

Most significantly, Section 68 amended the Business Rate Supplements Act 2009, imposing a requirement to conduct a ballot of those eligible to pay a proposed supplement. In practice this prevented new BRS being proposed, as few rate-payers would voluntarily vote in favour of additional taxes. As a result, no new supplements have been introduced since 2011, despite authorities notionally having the power to do so. The only major scheme to have been funded from a Business Rate Supplement remains the CrossRail project in London, which imposed the "CrossRail Supplement" in April 2010.

=== Part 5: Community empowerment ===
This section is concerned with council tax and requires local authorities, fire authorities, and police and crime commissioners to conduct a local referendum if they wish to implement a council tax increase that is considered "excessive" according to a set of principles defined by the Secretary of State for Communities and Local Government.

This section also creates new rights for charitable trusts, voluntary bodies and others to apply to councils and fire and rescue authorities to carry out services provided by the council (the "Community Right to Challenge"), and allows lists to be compiled of Assets of Community Value such as shops, pubs and playing fields, which are privately owned, but which are of value to the community; if such assets are later sold, the Act makes it easier for local communities to bid for and take over the assets. The government at the time identified the Community Right to Challenge as an aspect of its approach to improving choice, access and accountability in public services.

=== Part 6: Planning ===
Regional strategies are abolished but there is a duty for interested parties to co-operate in the preparation of development plans. The Community Infrastructure Levy now includes the additional costs, besides infrastructure costs, that development places on an area and the money raised can be used to fund the improvement, replacement, operation or maintenance of infrastructure as well as its provision.

The act allows neighbourhood plans to be developed but to be adopted they have to pass both an inspection stage and a local referendum. Suitable community organisations can obtain the rights to develop an area plan. A neighbourhood area, for which a neighbourhood plan may be developed, is an area designated by a local planning authority in response to an application from a parish council or from a neighbourhood forum in an unparished area.

The act specifies how planning decisions can be legally enforced and allows planning authorities to decline to process planning applications which include any region affected by a planning enforcement notice. Nationally the Infrastructure Planning Commission is abolished and new powers put in place to cover national infrastructure projects.

Chapter 4 of the act carries a requirement to carry out "pre-application consultation" before applying for planning permission for the development of any land in England. This section also specifies that the person carrying the planning application has a duty to consult the local community under s(4) part 6 of the act and that the applicant has a duty to consult every person living in the vicinity of the land.

=== Part 7: Housing ===
Each English housing authority must have an "allocation scheme" for determining priorities. Reasonable preference should be given to groups such as the homeless and those living in unsanitary conditions but otherwise housing authorities may themselves decide whom to support and the conditions of support. People subject to immigration control cannot be supported. An authority's duty to homeless people, who are not intentionally homeless, now ceases if they refuse reasonable accommodation.

The housing authorities must publish a "tenancy strategy" giving the types of tenancy provided, the circumstances under which they are granted, their length and the circumstances in which they may be extended. This section also includes many changes to tenancy law, to the financing of local authority housing and to the handling of complaints. Home Information Packs, which were required when selling a property, are abolished.

=== Part 8: London ===
The act abolished the London Development Agency transferring its functions to the GLA. A subsidiary of the GLA, GLA Land and Property, was established to take on the assets and liabilities of the LDA. The act requires the mayor of London to prepare and publish an economic development strategy for London – as a consequence of the abolition of the LDA.

The act also requires the mayor of London to publish an environment strategy for London, consolidating 5 different strategies for different environmental matters. The section also allows the Mayor of London to create "mayoral development corporations" whose object is to regenerate parts of London identified as "mayoral development areas".

=== Part 9: Compensation for compulsory acquisition ===
This is concerned with changes to the "Land Compensation Act 1961" which mean that existing planning permissions can be taken into account when compensation is being assessed.

=== Part 10: General ===
This section is concerned with administrative details, such as the date at which each section of the Act starts operating, how consultations should be carried out and the powers needed to make and amend the orders and regulations required by the Act.

== First prosecution under the act ==
The first prosecution to take place under the act was against Spencer Flower, former leader of Dorset County Council and also an East Dorset District Councillor, whose trial took place at Bournemouth Magistrates' Court (then in Stafford Road) on 30 March 2015. The charge was that on 25 February 2013, Flower had voted in a council meeting on East Dorset's core strategy without having disclosed a pecuniary interest in Synergy Housing Limited, which owned allotment land in Wimborne that was being considered for change of status under the said strategy. District Judge Nicholls found that Flower had a positive duty under section 31(4) of the act not to have participated in that meeting, nor to have voted. Flower was given a six-month conditional discharge and was ordered to pay £930 in costs. He continues to be a Dorset councillor for Verwood and was the leader of the council between 2019 and 2024.

== Further areas of influence ==
=== Cornwall ===
It was suggested that the Localism Bill could form a stepping stone to a devolved Cornish Assembly. Greg Clark, the minister responsible for the bill, had indicated that this would be possible. In November 2010, British Prime Minister David Cameron said that his government would "devolve a lot of power to Cornwall - that will go to the Cornish unitary authority." Talks took place in 2011 between the Deputy Prime Minister Nick Clegg and a cross party group, including the six Cornish MPs, as to how to bring about the devolution of powers to Cornwall. No progress was made, resulting in Mebyon Kernow relaunching its campaign for a Cornish Assembly in 2014.

=== Greater Manchester ===
In November 2011, the Greater Manchester Combined Authority used the Localism Act 2011 to seek provision for a further transfer of powers that would result in an additional devolution of authority from the UK's central government, enhancing its powers over transport and housing and granting it competencies to fund and control schemes on its own terms. However, further devolution required primary legislation and this was announced in November 2014.

== Reception ==
In 2013, Mayor of Hackney Jules Pipe criticised the act, saying that it "does not challenge the deep-rooted centralisation in the UK".
