= Planning Act 2008 =

Act of the Parliament of the United Kingdom

Planning Act 2008 (Note: Section 242.)
- Act of Parliament
- Parliament of the United Kingdom
- Long title: An Act to establish the Infrastructure Planning Commission and make provision about its functions; to make provision about, and about matters ancillary to, the authorisation of projects for the development of nationally significant infrastructure; to make provision about town and country planning; to make provision about the imposition of a Community Infrastructure Levy; and for connected purposes.
- Citation: 2008 c. 29
- Introduced by: Hazel Blears MP (Commons); Baroness Andrews (Lords)
- Territorial extent: England and Wales (in part); Scotland (in part); Northern Ireland (in part); (Note: Section 240.)

Dates
- Royal assent: 26 November 2008
- Commencement: Various (Note: Section 241.)
Other legislation
Amends	Gas Act 1965; Forestry Act 1967; Town and Country Planning Act 1990; Planning (Listed Buildings and Conservation Areas) Act 1990; Planning (Hazardous Substances) Act 1990; Courts and Legal Services Act 1990; New Roads and Street Works Act 1991; Water Industry Act 1991; Town and Country Planning (Scotland) Act 1997; Planning (Hazardous Substances) (Scotland) Act 1997; Government of Wales Act 2006
Amended by	Charities Act 2011; Infrastructure Act 2015; Infrastructure Planning (Radioactive Waste Geological Disposal Facilities) Order 2015; Wales Act 2017; Planning and Infrastructure Act 2025; Legislation (Procedure, Publication and Repeals) (Wales) Act 2025

Status: Amended

History of passage through Parliament

Text of statute as originally enacted

Revised text of statute as amended

The Planning Act 2008 (c. 29) is an act of the Parliament of the United Kingdom intended to speed up the process for approving major new infrastructure projects such as airports, roads, harbors, and energy facilities such as nuclear power and waste facilities. This was felt to be necessary after the 8-year approval process for Heathrow Terminal 5. Along with the Climate Change Bill and the Energy Bill, this bill was considered by the Brown administration to be one of the "three legislative pillars of the Government's strategy to secure long-term prosperity and quality of life for all." The Infrastructure Planning Commission has since been abolished and replaced with the Planning Inspectorate as of 31 March 2012.

== Aims ==
- A new body, the Infrastructure Planning Commission would make the decisions
- These decisions would be based on new national policy statements
- Hearings and the decision-making process would be timetabled
- The new regime would be used for major energy projects
- The Secretary of State would not be able to have the final say on major infrastructure decisions
- A new Community Infrastructure Levy on developments would finance infrastructure (money would be raised from developers to pay for the facilities needed as a consequence of new developments, such as schools, hospitals, and sewage plants).
- Planning appeals in relation to minor developments would be heard by a panel of local councillors and not by a planning inspector.

== Positions ==
=== Political parties ===
==== Labour ====
Labour introduced the Bill that became the Planning Act, although some 60 Labour members signed a Commons Motion opposing plans to set up an independent commission in May 2008.

==== Conservative ====
The Conservatives were opposed to the Infrastructure Planning Commission while in opposition with parts of the act amended by the Coalition Government via the Localism Act 2011.

Prime Minister David Cameron said before the 2010 election that "This quango is going to be almost entirely divorced from the processes of democracy. That is wrong. People need a planning system in which they feel they have a say – both at national and local level. That is why this Bill is getting such widespread opposition from so many different quarters".

The coalition government have, however, retained the concept of National Policy Statements, the authorisation regime and the Community Infrastructure Levy.

==== Liberal Democrats ====
The Liberal Democrats were also opposed the Infrastructure Planning Commission. Previously opposed to nuclear power, they are also granted the ability to vote against the nuclear power National Policy Statement when it comes before Parliament.

=== Environmental groups ===
Friends of the Earth say that the government must make Climate Change a central consideration in the decision-making process.

In November 2007 major environmental groups described the Planning Bill as a 'Developer's charter' and the head of planning at the RSPB expressed concern saying that although the minister claimed that the bill will help protect the environment that it was more likely to aid developers trying to push through major schemes with scant regard to wildlife and the countryside and could "fast track environmental harm".

=== Trade unions and businesses ===
John Cridland, then Deputy Director-General of the Confederation of British Industry supported the bill saying that it was in the national interest and would facilitate the building of infrastructure that will help Britain protect its energy security, build renewable power sources to cut carbon, and invest for the future".

== Nationally significant infrastructure projects ==
The Planning Act 2008 introduced a number of changes towards seeking development consent for nationally significant infrastructure projects (NSIPs), with the aim to overhaul the planning process in order to save costs and increase efficiency.

Among these changes included the formation of the Infrastructure Planning Commission which served as an independent examining body for all applications relating to major infrastructure projects on 1 October 2009. The IPC has since been abolished and replaced by the Planning Inspectorate on 31 March 2012. The responsibilities of the IPC were transferred to the National Infrastructure Directorate of the Planning Inspectorate.

The Planning Act 2008 also addressed the issue of having to receive several different regimes under Part 4 of the Planning Act 2008. Now NSIP projects would only require a Development Consent Order (DCO) therefore the requirement of seeking approval under several different consent regimes was no longer necessary. This front-loaded approach to unifying the consents regime was intended to make the process for applying for planning consent faster and more efficient.

National Policy Statements were introduced under Part 5 of the Planning Act 2008. The Planning Act requires that all applications which sought development consent would have to follow the guidelines for National Policy Statements. The National Policy Statements set out the need for development and other policy deliberations. The sustainability of the policy has to be assessed beforehand to ensure compliance with environmental sustainability standards. The National Policy Statements were intended to make the outcome more certain by following guidelines. This had clear benefits for applicants who invested in a wealth of resources in order to bring development consent into fruition and in financial matters.

This new system was intended to streamline the process for applying for development consent through procedural amendments to the planning regime.

== The Infrastructure Planning Commission (IPC) ==
The Infrastructure Planning Commission was formed on 1 October 2009 with a brief to oversee planning applications for major infrastructure projects (also known as nationally significant infrastructure projects) such as power stations, roads, railways and airports claiming to cut the time to make a decision from seven years to less than a year and saving the taxpayer £300 million per year.

Applications for large energy and transport projects had to be made to the IPC from 1 March 2010, but by December 2010 only two applications had in fact been made, one of which the IPC refused to accept as inadequately prepared. Despite claims that the general public would be cut out of the authorisation process, over 1,000 representations were made on the application that the IPC accepted.

== Community Infrastructure Levy ==
The Community Infrastructure Levy is a form of planning gain tax, where a proportion of the increase in value on land as a result of planning permission is used to finance the supporting infrastructure, such as schools and will 'unlock housing growth'.

== Amendments ==
=== Localism Act 2011 ===
The coalition government introduced the Localism Act 2011, that made changes to the regime under the Planning Act 2008. The Localism Act replaced the Infrastructure Planning Commission with the Planning Inspectorate, and returned overall decision-making to the Secretary of State who responds based on the recommendation of the Planning Inspectorate. The Localism Act also allows the House of Commons to be able to veto National Policy Statements, and makes other changes to the Planning Act regime. Previously, the Infrastructure Planning Commission were responsible for planning approval related to Nationally Significant Infrastructure Projects, and were not directly accountable to the public. Section 128(1) of the Localism Act abolishes the aforementioned Infrastructure Planning Commission handing over the responsibility for decisions related to Nationally Significant Infrastructure Projects towards Government Ministers. Section 130(3) of the Act ensures that national policy statements which are used to guide planning approval for NSIP's can be voted for by the parliament.

=== The Infrastructure Planning (Radioactive Waste Geological Disposal Facilities) Order 2015 ===
Amends sections 14 and appends section 30A to the Planning Act 2008. It sets out rules for disposal of radioactive waste, and surveying the potential sites.

== Recent developments ==
As of 2024, the Planning Inspectorate continues to oversee applications for Nationally Significant Infrastructure Projects (NSIPs), with expanded focus on climate resilience and biodiversity net gain requirements. These updates reflect the UK Government’s commitment to aligning infrastructure planning with its Net Zero Strategy and the Environment Act 2021.

Between 2021 and 2024, several reforms were introduced to modernize the Development Consent Order (DCO) process. These included the digitization of application systems, efforts to consolidate the relationship between local plans and national policy statements, and new guidance to enhance community consultation and transparency.

In 2022, the Department for Levelling Up, Housing and Communities launched a consultation on reforming Environmental Impact Assessments (EIAs) to better integrate sustainability and biodiversity considerations. The planning regime now encourages earlier engagement with local communities and environmental stakeholders during pre-application phases.

These developments aim to streamline the planning process while maintaining environmental standards and public accountability.
