= Town and Country Planning (Scotland) Act 1997 =

Act of the Parliament of the United Kingdom

Town and Country Planning (Scotland) Act 1997 (Note: Section 278(1).)
- Act of Parliament
- Parliament of the United Kingdom
- Long title: An Act to consolidate certain enactments relating to town and country planning in Scotland with amendments to give effect to recommendations of the Scottish Law Commission
- Citation: 1997 c. 8
- Territorial extent: Scotland; England and Wales (section 70 and schedule 7 only); (Note: Section 278(3)–(4).)

Dates
- Royal assent: 27 February 1997
- Commencement: 27 May 1997 (Note: Section 278(2).)
Other legislation
Amended by	List: Planning (Listed Buildings and Conservation Areas) (Scotland) Act 1997; Planning (Consequential Provisions) (Scotland) Act 1997; Secretary of State for the Environment, Transport and the Regions Order 1997; Environmental Impact Assessment (Scotland) Regulations 1999; Scotland Act 1998 (Consequential Modifications) (No.2) Order 1999; Scotland Act 1998 (Consequential Modifications) Order 2000; Pollution Prevention and Control (Scotland) Regulations 2000; Abolition of Feudal Tenure etc. (Scotland) Act 2000; National Parks (Scotland) Act 2000; Postal Services Act 2000; Transport Act 2000; Postal Services Act 2000 (Consequential Modifications No. 1) Order 2001; Secretaries of State for Transport, Local Government and the Regions and for Environment, Food and Rural Affairs Order 2001; Transfer of Functions (Transport, Local Government and the Regions) Order 2002; Scottish Public Services Ombudsman Act 2002; Local Government in Scotland Act 2003; Land Reform (Scotland) Act 2003; Water Environment and Water Services (Scotland) Act 2003; Agricultural Holdings (Scotland) Act 2003; Environmental Impact Assessment (Water Management) (Scotland) Regulations 2003; Communications Act 2003 (Consequential Amendments) Order 2003; Planning and Compulsory Purchase Act 2004; Finance Act 2004; Nature Conservation (Scotland) Act 2004; Town and Country Planning (Electronic Communications) (Scotland) Order 2004; Planning etc. (Scotland) Act 2006; Planning and Compulsory Purchase Act 2004 (Commencement No. 2 and Consequential Provisions) (Scotland) Order 2006; Transport Act 2000 (Consequential Amendments) (Scotland) Order 2006; Tribunals, Courts and Enforcement Act 2007; Transport and Works (Scotland) Act 2007; Town and Country Planning (Marine Fish Farming) (Scotland) Order 2007; Planning Act 2008; Flood Risk Management (Scotland) Act 2009; Climate Change (Scotland) Act 2009; Planning etc. (Scotland) Act 2006 (Consequential Amendments) Order 2009; Public Health etc. (Scotland) Act 2008 (Commencement No. 3, Consequential Provisions and Revocation) Order 2009; Marine (Scotland) Act 2010; Water Environment (Controlled Activities) (Scotland) Regulations 2011; Waste (Scotland) Regulations 2011; Treaty of Lisbon (Changes in Terminology) Order 2011; Postal Services Act 2011; Growth and Infrastructure Act 2013; Aquaculture and Fisheries (Scotland) Act 2013; Public Services Reform (Planning) (Local Review Procedure) (Scotland) Order 2013; Public Services Reform (Planning) (Pre-application consultation) (Scotland) Order 2013; Planning etc. (Scotland) Act 2006 (Supplementary and Consequential Provisions) Order 2013; Public Bodies (Abolition of Administrative Justice and Tribunals Council) Order 2013; Regulatory Reform (Scotland) Act 2014; Land Reform (Scotland) Act 2016; Digital Economy Act 2017; Crown Estate Transfer Scheme 2017; Communications Act 2003 and the Digital Economy Act 2017 (Consequential Amendments to Primary Legislation) Regulations 2017; Forestry and Land Management (Scotland) Act 2018; Planning (Scotland) Act 2019; Town and Country Planning (Emergency Period and Extended Period) (Coronavirus) (Scotland) Regulations 2020; Heat Networks (Scotland) Act 2021; Town and Country Planning (Emergency Period and Extended Period) (Coronavirus) (Scotland) Regulations 2021; Town and Country Planning (Miscellaneous Temporary Modifications) (Coronavirus) (Scotland) Regulations 2021; Town and Country Planning (Miscellaneous Temporary Modifications) (Coronavirus) (Scotland) Regulations 2022; Planning and Infrastructure Act 2025; Environmental Authorisations (Scotland) Amendment Regulations 2025; Climate Change (Local Development Plan) (Repeals) (Scotland) Order 2025
Relates to	Planning (Listed Buildings and Conservation Areas) (Scotland) Act 1997; Planning (Hazardous Substances) (Scotland) Act 1997; Planning (Consequential Provisions) (Scotland) Act 1997

Status: Amended

Text of statute as originally enacted

Revised text of statute as amended

The Town and Country Planning (Scotland) Act 1997 (c. 8) is an act of the Parliament of the United Kingdom. The act is the principal piece of legislation governing the use and development of land within Scotland. The act's forerunner was the Town and Country Planning (Scotland) Act 1972.

The enactments consolidated by the act were repealed by section 3 of, and schedule 1 to, the Planning (Consequential Provisions) (Scotland) Act 1997.

The 1997 act is supported by various pieces of subordinate legislation, such as the Town and Country Planning (General Development Procedure) (Scotland) Order 1992, the Town and Country Planning (General Permitted Development) (Scotland) Order 1992, and the Town and Country Planning (Use Classes) (Scotland) Order 1997.

== Subsequent developments ==
More recently, and following a white paper on Modernising the Planning System, the Scottish Parliament passed the Planning etc (Scotland) Act 2006, which sought to amend certain parts of the 1997 act; including development plan preparation, development control, now known as development management in Scotland, and enforcement. These changes came into force on 3 August 2009 and amended the 1997 Act, which still remains the principal planning act in Scotland.

One change brought in by the 2006 act was the formation of a Strategic Development Planning Authority to prepare a strategic development plan in each of the four city regions.

== See also ==
- Grampian condition
- Town and country planning in the United Kingdom
- Planning and Compulsory Purchase Act 2004
- Strategic Development Planning Authority
