= Planning etc. (Scotland) Act 2006 =

Act of the Scottish Parliament

Planning etc. (Scotland) Act 2006 (Note: Section 60.)
- Act of the Scottish Parliament
- Scottish Parliament
- Long title: An Act of the Scottish Parliament to make further provision relating to town and country planning; to make provision for business improvement districts; and for connected purposes.
- Citation: 2006 asp 17
- Territorial extent: Scotland

Dates
- Royal assent: 20 December 2006
- Commencement: various (Note: Section 59.)

Other legislation
- Amends: Local Government (Scotland) Act 1973; Town and Country Planning (Scotland) Act 1997; Planning (Listed Buildings and Conservation Areas) (Scotland) Act 1997

Status: Amended

Text of statute as originally enacted

Revised text of statute as amended

Text of the Planning etc. (Scotland) Act 2006 as in force today (including any amendments) within the United Kingdom, from legislation.gov.uk.

The Planning etc. (Scotland) Act 2006 (asp 17) is an act of the Scottish Parliament.

== Provisions ==
The act introduces good neighbour agreements which restrict what land use a private individual can do in their capacity as a landowner.

One effect of which was the creation of four Strategic Development Planning Authorities. These bodies each comprise several local planning authorities and are charged with producing long-term development plans for the following city-regions

- Glasgow and the Clyde Valley
- Aberdeen City and Shire
- Dundee, Perth, Angus and North Fife
- Edinburgh and South East Scotland

The act replaces planning agreements with planning obligations which may be subject to conditions or unconditional, or may require a periodical or one-off payment.

The act creates a hierarchy of different development types with national transport infrastructure falling under the "National Development” framework.
