= Town and Country Planning Act 1990 =

Act of the Parliament of the United Kingdom

Town and Country Planning Act 1990 (Note: Section 337(1).)
- Act of Parliament
- Parliament of the United Kingdom
- Long title: An Act to consolidate certain enactments relating to town and country planning (excluding special controls in respect of buildings and areas of special architectural or historic interest and in respect of hazardous substances) with amendments to give effect to recommendations of the Law Commission.
- Citation: 1990 c. 8
- Territorial extent: England and Wales (Note: Section 337(3).)

Dates
- Royal assent: 24 May 1990
- Commencement: 24 August 1990 (Note: Section 337(2).)

Other legislation
- Amends: Planning (Consequential Provisions) Act 1990
- Amended by: Planning and Compensation Act 1991; Local Government (Wales) Act 1994; Coal Industry Act 1994; Police and Magistrates' Courts Act 1994; Agricultural Tenancies Act 1995; Environment Act 1995; Statute Law (Repeals) Act 1995; Gas Act 1995; Town and Country Planning (Costs of Inquiries etc.) Act 1995; Police Act 1996; Trusts of Land and Appointment of Trustees Act 1996; Education Act 1996; Channel Tunnel Rail Link Act 1996; Police Act 1997; Audit Commission Act 1998; Greater London Authority Act 1999; Countryside and Rights of Way Act 2000; Licensing Act 2003; Communications Act 2003; Anti-social Behaviour Act 2003; Courts Act 2003; Criminal Justice Act 2003; Planning and Compulsory Purchase Act 2004; Fire and Rescue Services Act 2004; Public Audit (Wales) Act 2004; Clean Neighbourhoods and Environment Act 2005; Government of Wales Act 2006; Tribunals, Courts and Enforcement Act 2007; Greater London Authority Act 2007; Local Government and Public Involvement in Health Act 2007; Housing and Regeneration Act 2008; Planning Act 2008; Local Democracy, Economic Development and Construction Act 2009; Postal Services Act 2011; Police Reform and Social Responsibility Act 2011; Localism Act 2011; Enterprise and Regulatory Reform Act 2013; Growth and Infrastructure Act 2013; Local Audit and Accountability Act 2014; Criminal Justice and Courts Act 2015; Infrastructure Act 2015; Housing and Planning Act 2016; Policing and Crime Act 2017; Wales Act 2017; Neighbourhood Planning Act 2017; Digital Economy Act 2017; Business and Planning Act 2020; Sentencing Act 2020; Environment Act 2021; Charities Act 2022; Levelling-up and Regeneration Act 2023; Planning and Infrastructure Act 2025; English Devolution and Community Empowerment Act 2026
- Relates to: Planning (Listed Buildings and Conservation Areas) Act 1990; Planning (Hazardous Substances) Act 1990; Planning (Consequential Provisions) Act 1990

Status: Amended

Text of statute as originally enacted

Revised text of statute as amended

Text of the Town and Country Planning Act 1990 as in force today (including any amendments) within the United Kingdom, from legislation.gov.uk.

The Town and Country Planning Act 1990 (c. 8) is an act of the Parliament of the United Kingdom regulating the development of land in England and Wales. It is a central part of English land law in that it concerns town and country planning in the United Kingdom. Repealed in parts by the Planning and Compensation Act 1991, it is now also complemented by the Planning and Compulsory Purchase Act 2004.

The enactments consolidated by the act were repealed by section 4 of, and schedule 1 to, the Planning (Consequential Provisions) Act 1990.

== Provisions ==
The act contains 15 parts with 337 sections, plus 17 schedules, and serves as an incomplete, but expansive code of planning regulations in England and Wales.

=== Part I, planning authorities ===
Subsections 1 and 2 set out that county and district (county and county borough in Wales) councils are Local Planning Authorities (LPAs) in non-metropolitan counties; that metropolitan district councils (usually unitary authorities) are LPAs in metropolitan counties and that different authorities govern Greater London and the Isles of Scilly. This is subject to sections 2 and 9. Subsection 1(3) states: "In England (exclusive of the metropolitan counties, Greater London and the Isles of Scilly) all functions conferred on local planning authorities by or under the planning Acts shall be exercisable both by county planning authorities and district planning authorities." and is subject to Sch. 1. Subsection 1 (4) deals with mineral planning authorities. The exercise of functions in Wales is subject to Schedule 1A. This section is subject to sections 4A to 8.

Section 2 allows the Secretary of State to join council planning authorities into joint planning boards.

Under section 2A the Mayor of London may in circumstances prescribed in the Town and Country Planning (Mayor of London) Order 2008/580 or directions under that order, direct that he is to be the local planning authority to determine an application made under s 70 or s 73. Under section 2B the Mayor of London is to have regard to guidance issued by the Secretary of State, must give reasons, and must at that time send a copy of the direction to the applicant and the Secretary of State. The Mayor may also become the planning authority for a connected application for Listed Building, Conservation Area, or hazardous substances consent if he so considers. Under section 2C the Mayor of London after granting outline permission, may pass the determination of reserved matters on to the original LPA (i.e. London Borough or Corporation of London). He may also do this for connected applications he grants 'subject to subsequent approval'. Section 2D enables secondary legislation related to the Mayor's planning powers. Section 2E passes the function from the LPA to the Mayor of agreeing on a Planning Obligation related to the direction above after that time. The Mayor must consult the LPA before agreeing to one and both the LPA and Mayor may enforce it. Section 2F states that before determining an application, the Mayor of London must give the applicant and the local planning authority to whom the application was made an opportunity, with at least 14 days' notice, to make oral representations at a hearing (“a representation hearing”). The Mayor must publish a procedural document for this.

Section 3 retains the advisory joint planning committee for Greater London.

Section 4A says that National Park Authorities (not all National Parks) are the sole local planning authority for the area of the Park except for functions in ss 198 to 201, 206 to 209, and 211 to 215 where the district planning authority for an area in the park shall share functions with the national park authority, who in such cases retain all their legal functions. Section 5 makes a similar provision as 4A for the Broads Authority for land in that area. However, only for Chapter I of Part VIII (Trees: Ss 197-214D) and sections 249, 250, and 300. Section 6 makes a similar provision as 4A for Enterprise Zone Authorities for land in that area for such functions as a statutory Order may prescribe. Sections 7 to 8A make similar provisions as 4A for Urban Development Corporations under the Local Government, Planning and Land Act 1980, Housing Action Trusts under Housing Act 1988 and the Urban Regeneration Agency under the Leasehold Reform, Housing and Urban Development Act 1993 for their respective areas to the extent an appropriate order directs.

Section 9 creates the power to make consequential and supplementary provisions about authorities for land in that area for such functions as a statutory order may prescribe.

Part II is now repealed and replaced by the Planning and Compulsory Purchase Act 2004. It used to concern larger scale Development Plans, particularly Unitary Development Plans in metropolitan areas including London, and, for non-metropolitan areas, Structure Plans and Local Plans.

=== Part III, Control Over Development ===
Part III's concern with control over development focuses on effectively putting into public ownership, under democratically accountable regulation, all significant construction or demolition decisions by private landowners. This was seen necessary to ensure that private development did not run contrary to the community's interest. Section 59 states that "The Secretary of State shall by ... “development order”... provide for the granting of planning permission." An initial application maybe for Outline Planning Permission as this allows the applicant to see whether an application is likely to be accepted before carrying out the costly work of preparing a full application. This will mean that there are other "reserved matters" to be resolved through one or more further applications.

Section 73 allows applicants to request the variation or removal of conditions on a previous permission.

Section 78 allows applicants to appeal against decisions on applications, or the non-determination of applications.

==== Section 106 ====
Section 106 of the act, in conjunction with DoE Circular 5/05, allows for local planning authorities and persons interested in land to agree contributions, arrangements and restrictions as Planning Agreements or Planning Obligations. Applicants can offer such agreements unilaterally or negotiate and agree them as support for their application to make it accord with local planning requirements, but without some of the rigorous controls of Planning Conditions under s 70(1).

It relates to money paid by developers to local planning authorities in order to offset the costs of the external effects of development. For example, if a developer were to build 100 new houses, there would be effects on local schools, roads etc., which the local authority would have to deal with. In that situation, there might be a Section 106 agreement as part of the granting of planning permission. The agreement might also entail provisions about production of social housing. The developer might agree to make a contribution towards the provision of new schools or traffic calming on local roads.

Section 106A has the effect that any modification or discharge of a s 106 Agreement must be agreed by deed between the parties and in accordance with s 106B. It creates the right to apply in a prescribed form to modify a s 106 agreement once five years has passed since the agreement, or such shorter period as secondary legislation may prescribe. It prevents one applicant applying for a modification which may become enforceable against others who have not applied.

It clarifies that s 84 of the Law of Property Act 1925 (power to discharge or modify restrictive covenants affecting land) does not apply to a planning obligation.

Section 106B contains the right of the applicant to appeal against the decision or non-determination of a local planning authority under s 106A to the Secretary of State. Section 106B states "before determining the appeal the Secretary of State shall, if either the applicant or the authority so wish, give each of them an opportunity of appearing before and being heard by a person appointed by the Secretary of State for the purpose". It states "the determination of an appeal by the Secretary of State under this section shall be final". Schedule 6 applies to determine how the appeal is heard and by whom.

=== Parts IV and V, Compensation ===
Sections 107 to 118 deal with compensation for effects of certain orders, notices etc. The Planning and Compensation Act 1991 repealed sections 113 and 114, and all of Part V, in sections 119 to 136. It previously dealt with compensation for restrictions on new developments in limited cases.

=== Part VI, right to be purchased ===
Sections 137 to 171 deal with rights of the owner to require purchase of interests. Namely, interests affected by planning decisions or orders in certain circumstances and interests affected by planning proposals: serving blight notices.

=== Part VII, enforcement ===
Sections 172 to 196C deal with methods of enforcement of planning law.

=== Part VIII, trees, amenity, adverts ===
Sections 197 to 225 deal with Special Controls. Specifically, those for:

- Trees
- Land adversely affecting amenity of neighbourhood
- Advertisements

Section 215 of the act empowers a local planning authority to issue a notice to the owner of land or a property where it adversely affects the local area, and the notice can specify what remedial action is required. Sub-section 1 states,

If it appears to the local planning authority that the amenity of a part of their area, or of an adjoining area, is adversely affected by the condition of land in their area, they may serve on the owner and occupier of the land a notice under this section.

— Section 215(1), Town and Country Planning Act 1990

It was under this provision that a notice was served in 2015 by the Royal Borough of Kensington and Chelsea on Zipporah Lisle-Mainwaring, after the property developer had painted the front of her house in red-and-white candy cane stripes. However, following judicial review by the High Court of Justice, Mr Justice Gilbart ruled,

In my judgment, to allow a local planning authority (LPA) to use section 215 to deal with questions of aesthetics, as opposed to disrepair or dilapidation, falls outside the intention and spirit of the Planning Code...

— Mr Justice Gilbart

Thus overturning the notice, and allowing Lisle-Mainwaring to keep the stripes on her house.

=== Part IX, acquisition of land for planning ===
Sections 226 to 246 deal with acquisition and appropriation of land for planning and public purposes. Also the extinguishment of certain rights, e.g. on burial places and constitution of joint bodies to hold land for planning purposes.

=== Part X, highways ===
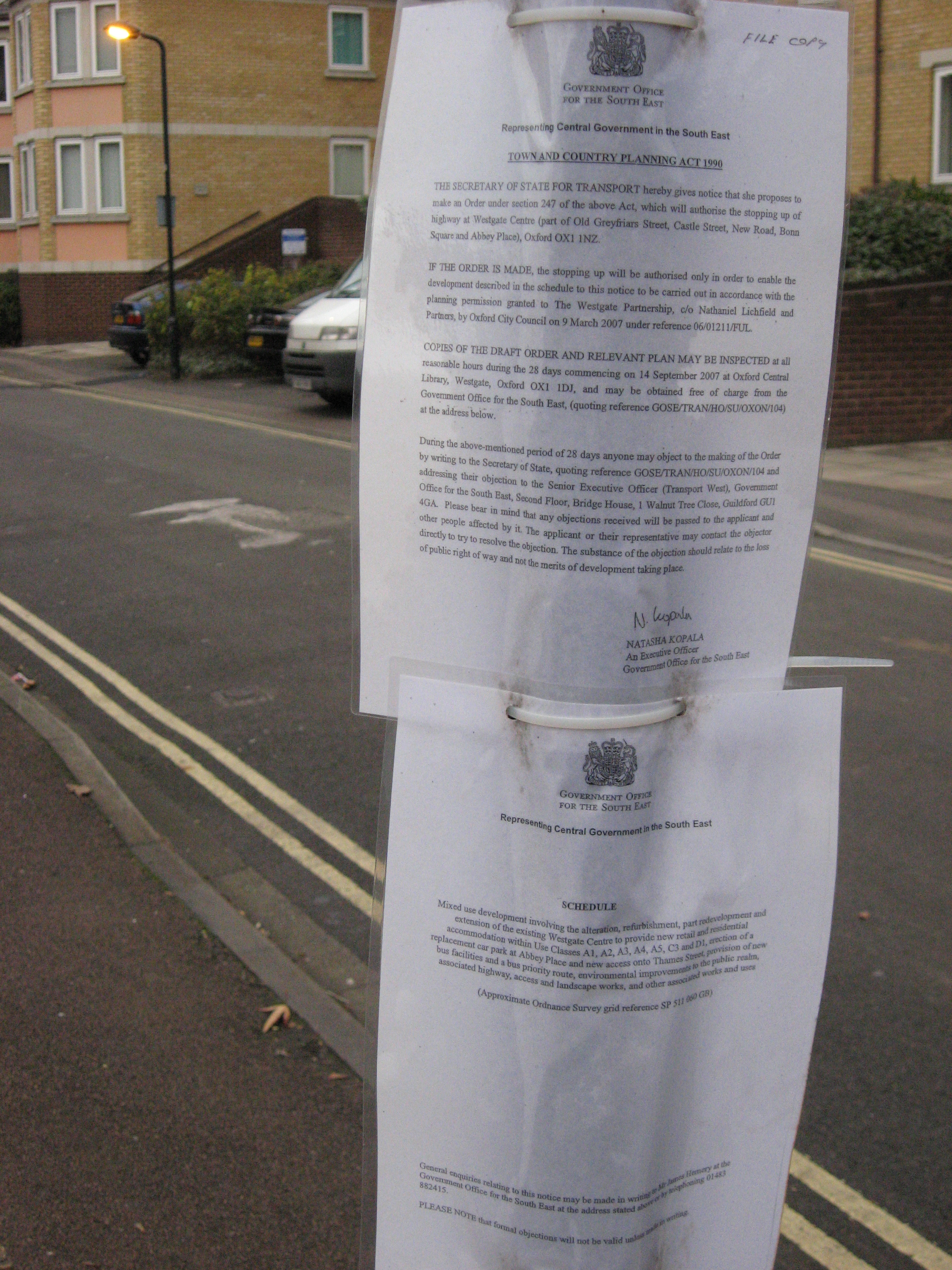
A notice in Oxford made under the Town and Country Planning Act 1990, section 247 to stop up a road.

Sections 246 to 261 deal with highways.

Sections 247 and 248 deal with the stopping up of highways.

=== Part XI, statutory undertakings ===
Sections 262 to 283 deal with statutory undertakers. These are persons authorised by any enactment to carry on any railway, light railway, tramway, road transport, water transport, canal, inland navigation, dock, harbour, pier or lighthouse undertaking or any undertaking for the supply of hydraulic power and a relevant airport operator (within the meaning of Part V of the Airports Act 1986). Deemed statutory undertakers for sections 55, 90, 101, 108(3), 139 to 141, 143, 148, 170(12)(b), 236(2)(a), 237 to 241, 245, 247(4)(b), 253, 257(2), 263(1) and (2), 264, 266 to 283, 288(10)(a), 306, 325(9), 336(2) and (3), para.18 of Sch.1 and Schs. 8, 13 and 14 are any public gas transporter, water or sewerage undertaker, the National Rivers Authority, any universal postal service provider in connection with the provision of a universal postal service, the Civil Aviation Authority and a person who holds a licence under Chapter I of Part I of the Transport Act 2000 (air traffic services) shall be deemed to be statutory undertakers and their undertakings statutory undertakings. This applies with variations for a universal postal service provider and licence holders under section 6 of the Electricity Act 1989 or Chapter I of Part I of the Transport Act 2000.

=== Part XII, Validity of plans ===
Sections 284 to 292 deal with validity of development plans, some planning related orders, decisions, directions, enforcement and similar notices.

=== Part XIII, Crown lands ===
Sections 292A to 302 deal with the application the act to Crown Land.

=== Part XIV, financial provisions ===
Sections 303 to 314 deal with financial provision. This includes application fees to the LPA, costs of certain inquiries, grants for research and education, contributions by ministers towards compensation paid by local authorities, contribution by local authorities and statutory undertakers, assistance for acquisition of property where objection made to blight notice in certain cases, recovery from acquiring authorities of sums paid by way of compensation, sums recoverable from acquiring authorities reckonable for purposes of grant, expenses of government departments, general provision as to receipts of Secretary of State and the expenses of county councils.

=== Part XV, Miscellaneous ===
Sections 303 to 337 deal with miscellaneous and general provisions. Note section 318 deals with ecclesiastic property, section 319 deals with the Isles of Scilly, section 300 provides a power to require information as to interests, section 333 deals with regulations and orders and section 336 deals with interpretation.

== Schedules ==
The original Act included 17 schedules. These have since been extended. The Localism Act 2011 added a schedule which covered community right to build orders, a community power introduced to give people the right to bring forward small-scale, site-specific proposals for community-led development.

== Regulations ==
Under section 333 of the act (amongst others), the Secretary of State for Communities and Local Government is enabled to make regulations, such as The Town and Country Planning (Control of Advertisements) (England) Regulations 2007, and The Town and Country Planning (Control of Advertisements) (England) (Amendment) Regulations 2012, which in turn led to the government publication, Plain English guide to flying flags.

== Planned repeal in Wales ==
As part of a Welsh Government project to consolidate planning law in Wales, the Town and Country Planning Act 1990 is to be repealed and replaced upon the commencement of the Planning (Consequential Provisions) (Wales) Act 2026 and the Planning (Wales) Act 2026 respectively.

== See also ==
- Town and Country Planning Act 1947
- Town and country planning in the United Kingdom
- Planning Policy Guidance Notes
- Grampian condition
