= PPS 9 =

Planning Policy Statement 9: Biodiversity and Geological Conservation commonly abbreviated as PPS9, was a document produced by the British Government to advise local planning authorities on planning policies for the protection of biodiversity and geological conservation through the planning system. This planning policy statement was introduced in August 2005 and replaced Revised PPG 9: Nature conservation (published October 1994).

PPS9 was reinforced and updated by Office of the Deputy Prime Minister (ODPM) Circular 06/2005: Biodiversity and Geological Conservation - Statutory Obligations and Their Impact Within the Planning System, also published by the British Government on 15 August 2005.

Circular 06/2005 and PPS9 placed a clear duty on local planning authorities to ensure that protected species and habitats in the UK are a "material consideration" in the determination of a planning application.

PPS 9, along with other planning policy statements, was replaced on 27 March 2012 by the National Planning Policy Framework.

The statement stated that it protected " protect valuable habitats such as ancient woodland that are not covered by local or national designations". The statement continued to allow building on ancient heritage in certain situations.

The Royal Society for the Protection of Birds criticised the legislation for being too vague.

== See also ==
- Planning Policy Statements
- Town and country planning in the United Kingdom
- Planning and Compulsory Purchase Act 2004
