= Flood risk assessment =

Type of risk assessment with respect to floods

A flood risk assessment (FRA) is an assessment of the risk of flooding from all flooding mechanisms, the identification of flood mitigation measures and should provide advice on actions to be taken before and during a flood. The sources of water which produce floods include: groundwater, surface water (rivers, streams or watercourses), artificial water (burst water mains, canals or reservoirs), sewers and drains, seawater.

For each of the sources of water, different hydraulic intensities occur. Floods can occur because of a combination of sources of flooding, such as high groundwater and an inadequate surface water drainage system. The topography, hydrogeology and physical attributes of the existing or proposed development need to be considered. A flood risk assessment should be an evaluation of the flood risk and the consequences and impact and vulnerability.

In the UK, the writing of professional flood risk assessments is undertaken by Civil Engineering Consultants. They will have membership of the Institution of Civil Engineers and are bound by their rules of professional conduct. A key requirement is to ensure such professional flood risk assessments are independent to all parties by carrying out their professional duties with complete objectivity and impartiality. Their professional advice should be supported by professional indemnity insurance for such specific professional advice ultimately held with a Lloyd's of London underwriter.

Professional flood risk assessments can cover single buildings or whole regions. They can part of a due-diligence process for existing householders or businesses, or can be required in England and Wales to provide independent evidence to a planning application on the flood risk.

In the United States of America, flood maps come from the Federal Emergency Management Agency (FEMA). They work with all levels of government in each part of the country to establish which areas have any risk of flooding. Risk Mapping, Assessment, and Planning (Risk MAP), is the process used to make Flood Insurance Rate Maps. These maps break down what communities can do to keep their surroundings safe, and get through flooding disasters in 4 phases: Discovery, Analysis & Mapping, Preliminary Flood Mapping Release, and Map Adoption. The goals are to identify, assess, communicate, and reduce risk.

These federal maps are used by local governments to inform civilians on where their evacuation routes are and how they should be read based on zones.

Through flood watches and warnings, civilians are informed that their specific location either has a possibility of being impacted, or will be impacted during a certain time slot. It is constantly updated and monitored by the National Weather Service. "The National Weather Service will discuss flood and flash flood potential in daily hazardous weather outlooks and in the graphical weather story on National Weather Service websites." Vehicles are the top causes of death in flood situations. Many think their vehicles can withstand water on roads, but no one knows what is under the water, or if the roadway is compromised. Water can rise at extremely high speeds, and being in a confined area, such as a car, is not recommended. Turn around and get out of the area as safe and quickly as possible.

== England and Wales ==
In England and Wales, the Environment Agency and Natural Resources Wales respectively, require a professional Flood Risk Assessment (FRA) to be submitted alongside planning applications in areas that are known to be at risk of flooding (within flood zones 2 or 3) and/ or are greater than 1ha in area, planning permission is not usually granted until the FRA has been accepted by the Environment Agency.

=== PPS 25 – England only ===
Flood Risk Assessments are required to be completed according to the National Planning Policy Framework, which replaces Planning Policy Statement PPS 25: Development and Flood Risk. The initial legislation (PPG25) was introduced in 2001 and subsequently revised.

PPS 25 was designed to "strengthen and clarify the key role of the planning system in managing flood risk and contributing to adapting to the impacts of climate change." and sets out policies for local authorities to ensure flood risk is taken into account during the planning process to prevent inappropriate development in high risk areas and to direct development away from areas at highest risk.

In its introduction, PPS25 states "flooding threatens life and causes substantial damage to property [and that] although [it] cannot be wholly prevented, its impacts can be avoided and reduced through good planning and management".

=== Composition of an FRA ===
For a flood risk assessment to be written, information is needed concerning the existing and proposed developments, the Environment Agency modeled flood levels and topographic levels on site. At its most simple (and cheapest) level an FRA can provide an indication of whether a development will be allowed to take place at a site.

An initial idea of the risk of fluvial flooding to a local area can be found on the Environment Agency flood map website.

FRAs consist of a detailed analysis of available data to inform the Environment Agency of flood risk at an individual site and also recommend to the developer any mitigation measures. More costly analysis of flood risk can be achieved through detailed flood modelling to challenge the agency's modelled levels and corresponding flood zones.

The FRA takes into account the risk and impact of flooding on the site, and takes into consideration how the development may affect flooding in the local area. It also includes provides recommendations as to how the risk of flooding to the development can be mitigated.

FRAs should also consider flooding from all sources including fluvial, groundwater, surface water runoff and sewer flooding.

For sites located within areas at risk of flooding a sequential test may be required. The aim of the sequential test is to direct development to locations at the lowest risk of flooding. The National Planning Policy Framework (NPPF) was amended in 2020 to require sequential tests for sites that are at risk of any form of flooding.

== Northern Ireland ==
In 2006, the Planning Service, part of The Department of the Environment, published Planning Policy Statement 15 (PPS15): Planning and flood risk. The guidelines are precautionary and advise against development in flood plains and areas subject to historical flooding. In exceptional cases a FRA can be completed to justify development in flood risk areas. Advice on flood risk assessment is provided to the Planning Service by the Rivers Agency, which is the statutory drainage and flood defence authority for Northern Ireland.

== Republic of Ireland ==
In 2009, the Department of the Environment, Heritage and Local Government and Office of Public Works published planning guidelines requiring local authorities to apply a sequential approach to flood risk management. The guidelines require that proposed development in flood risk areas must undergo a justification test, consisting of a flood risk assessment.

== United States of America ==
FEMA has an online "Flood Map Service Center" that allows citizens to input their coordinates or any location in the country, and it will state if the location is in a high risk flood zone or not. The Service Center also discusses the issue of flood damage and which homeowners are covered. "If you live in an area with low or moderate flood risk, you are 5 times more likely to experience flood than a fire in your home over the next 30 years." Flood maps are a guide for people who live there. It is important to listen to what government officials and local news networks are advising in the time of a flooding event.

If it is an event where evacuation needs to occur, make sure there are plans in place. Check local news and alerts to see what preparations are in place. If there is no car available, make prior plans or move to higher ground. "Flooding is the most common natural disaster in the United States."

The National Aeronautics and Space Administration (NASA) uses satellites to predict how extreme a flood will, how to better prepare, react, and respond. This is helpful in creating plans and modules for any weather events that will happen in the future. Planning for flooding risks is crucial to prevent residential damage, and in extreme cases, death.

Global Flood Monitoring System (GFMS) is a NASA satellite using real-time data to predict amounts of precipitation. It can be used by anyone on the website by zooming into a location. Any location on the map can detect flood intensity from the current day, and last 3 and 7 days. This flood model was developed on other models from the University of Washington, and University of Maryland. The maps at the bottom show the location's "streamflow, surface water storage, and inundation."

== Worst Year of Flooding in the United States ==
2019 is on record to be worst year of flooding throughout the United States. "High rainfall, rapid snowmelt, record flooding, extremely wet soils, and delayed planting" are the factors that contributed to record breaking flood levels throughout the entire country. A harsh winter of snowfall in farmland, and constant melting snow before the Spring season when crops get planted ruined crops and made the soil too wet to use. Sentinel-1 imagery shows the amount of permanent water compared to flood water. Farmers had to reluctantly stay patient for their soil to dry, which affected the amount of food they had to eat, and their business in selling them for profit. Without crops, the farmers had no way of making a business, and had no choice but to go through the waiting process.

== See also ==
- Flood warning
- Floods directive
- Flood Modeller Pro, software used to undertake flood risk assessments
