= Listed building =

Protected historic structure in the United Kingdom

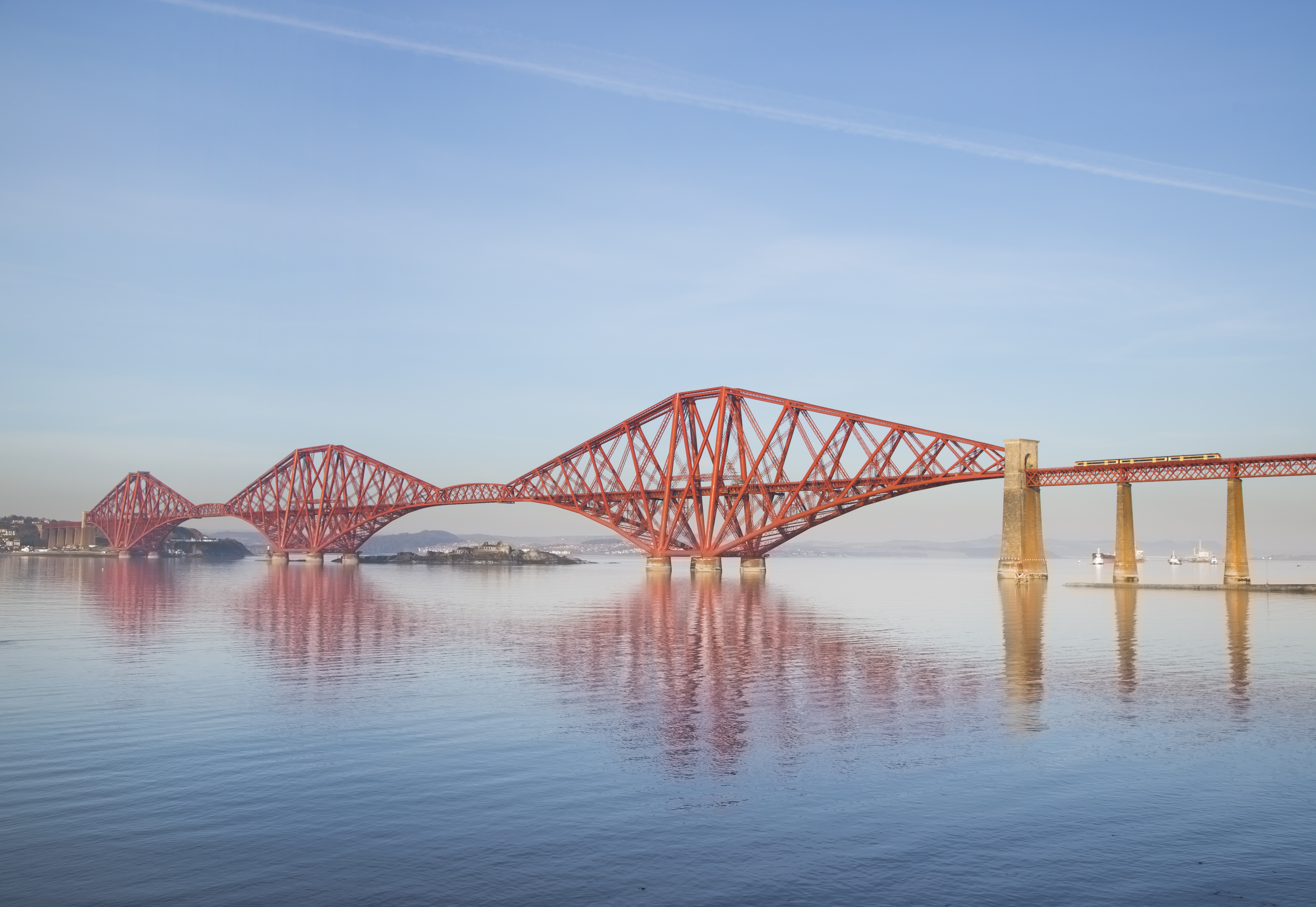
The Forth Bridge, designed by Sir Benjamin Baker and Sir John Fowler, which opened in 1890, and is now owned by Network Rail, is designated as a Category A listed building by Historic Environment Scotland.

In the United Kingdom, a listed building (Note: Welsh: adeilad rhestredig, Irish: foirgneamh liostaithe, Scottish Gaelic: togalach clàraichte.) is a structure of particular architectural or historical interest deserving of special protection. Such buildings are placed on one of the four statutory lists maintained by Historic England in England, Historic Environment Scotland in Scotland, Cadw in Wales, and the Historic Environment Division of the Department for Communities in Northern Ireland. The classification schemes differ between England and Wales, Scotland, and Northern Ireland (see sections below). The term has also been used in the Republic of Ireland, where buildings are protected under the Planning and Development Act 2000, although the statutory term in Ireland is "protected structure".

A listed building may not be demolished, extended, or altered without permission from the local planning authority, which typically consults the relevant central government agency. In England and Wales, a national amenity society must be notified of any work to be done on a listed building which involves any element of demolition.

Exemption from secular listed building control is provided for some buildings in current use for worship, but only in cases where the relevant religious organisation operates its own equivalent permissions procedure. Owners of listed buildings are, in some circumstances, compelled to repair and maintain them and can face criminal prosecution if they fail to do so or if they perform unauthorised alterations. When alterations are permitted, or when listed buildings are repaired or maintained, the owners are often required to use specific materials or techniques.

Although most sites appearing on the lists are buildings, other structures such as bridges, monuments, sculptures, war memorials, milestones and mileposts, and the Abbey Road zebra crossing made famous by the Beatles, are also listed. Ancient, military, and uninhabited structures, such as Stonehenge, are sometimes instead classified as scheduled monuments and are protected by separate legislation. (Note: Buildings designated as both listed structures and as scheduled monuments are not uncommon. Windsor Castle in England, and Raglan Castle in Wales are two such examples.) Cultural landscapes such as parks and gardens are currently "listed" on a non-statutory basis.

== Background ==
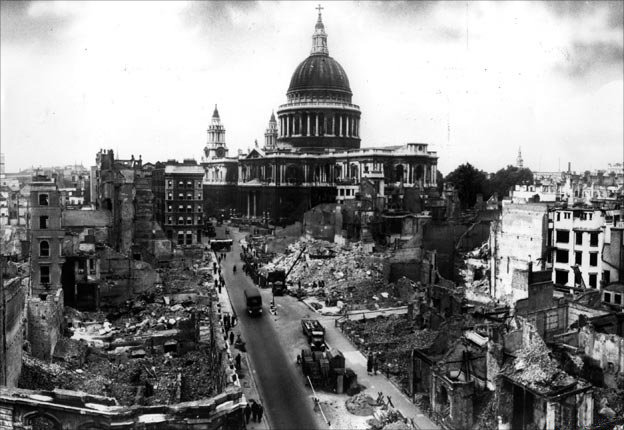
WWII bomb damage advanced the move to preserve architecturally significant buildings such as St Paul's Cathedral which was listed Grade I in 1950.

Although a limited number of 'ancient monuments' were given protection under the Ancient Monuments Protection Act 1882, there was reluctance to restrict the owners of occupied buildings in their actions related to their property. The extensive damage to buildings caused by German bombing during World War II prompted efforts to list and protect buildings that were deemed to be of particular architectural merit. Three hundred members of the Royal Institute of British Architects and the Society for the Protection of Ancient Buildings were dispatched to prepare the list under the supervision of the Inspectorate of Ancient Monuments, with funding from the Treasury. The listings were used as a means to determine whether a particular building should be rebuilt if it was damaged by bombing, with varying degrees of success. In Scotland, the process slightly predated the war with the Marquess of Bute (in his connections to the National Trust for Scotland) commissioning the architect Ian Lindsay in September 1936 to survey 103 towns and villages based on an Amsterdam model using three categories (A, B and C).

The basis of the current more comprehensive listing process was developed from the wartime system. It was enacted by a provision in the Town and Country Planning Act 1947 covering England and Wales, and the Town and Country Planning (Scotland) Act 1947 covering Scotland. Listing was first introduced into Northern Ireland under the Planning (Northern Ireland) Order 1972. The listing process has since developed slightly differently in each part of the UK.

=== Heritage protection ===
The process of protecting the built historic environment (i.e. getting a heritage asset legally protected) is called 'designation'. Several different terms are used because the processes use separate legislation: buildings are 'listed'; ancient monuments are 'scheduled', wrecks are 'protected', and battlefields, gardens and parks are 'registered'. A heritage asset is a part of the historic environment that is valued because of its historic, archaeological, architectural or artistic interest.

Only some of these are judged to be important enough to have extra legal protection through designation. Buildings that are not formally listed but still judged as being of heritage interest can still be regarded as a material consideration in the planning process.

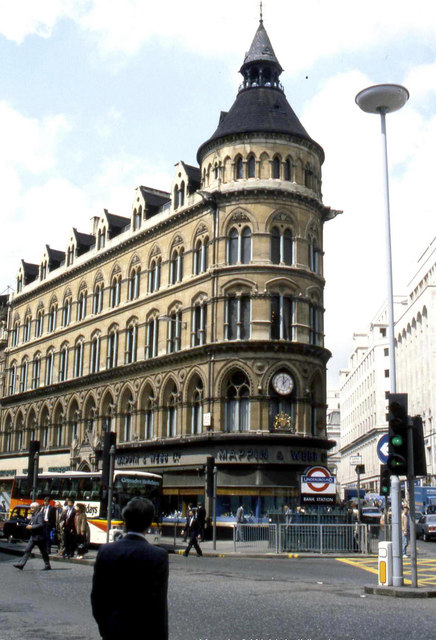
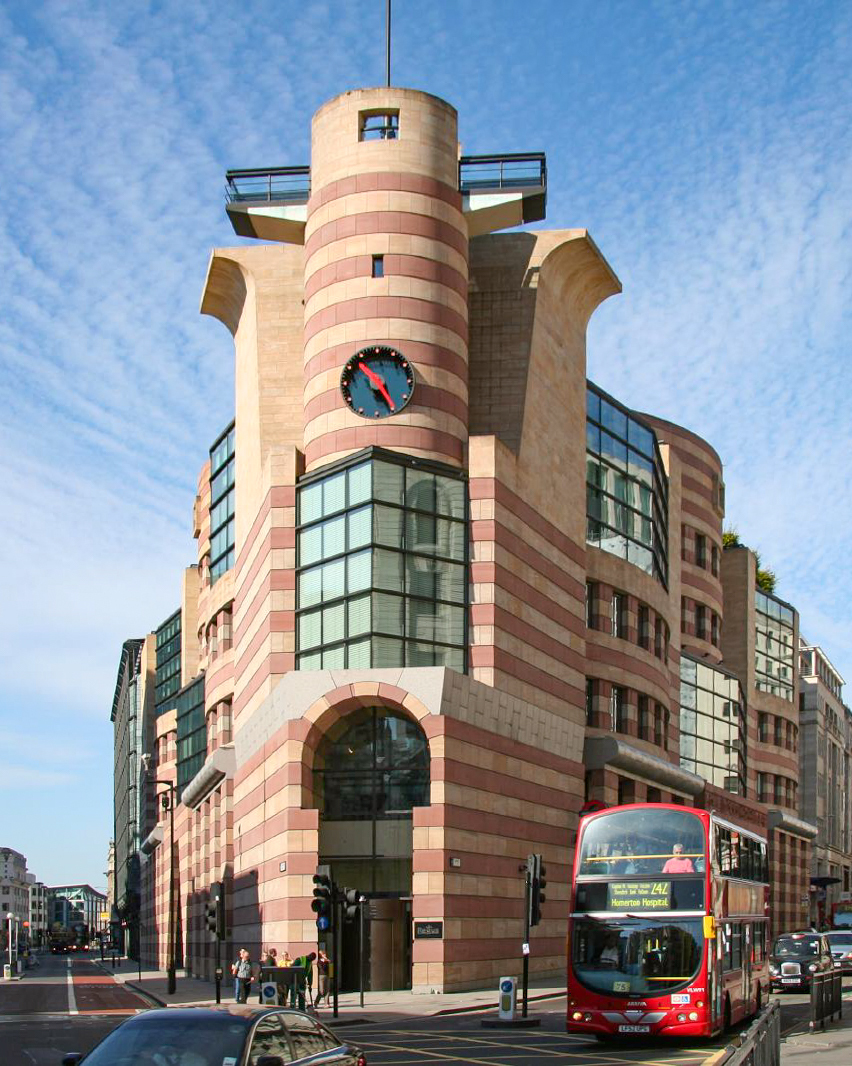
The Grade II listed Mappin & Webb building (left) was controversially demolished in 1994 to make way for No 1 Poultry (right) which was itself listed in 2016.

As a very rough guide, listed buildings are structures considered of special architectural and historical importance. Ancient monuments are of 'national importance' containing evidential values, and can on many occasions also relate to below ground or unoccupied sites and buildings.

== Eligibility ==
Almost anything can be listed. Buildings and structures of special historic interest come in a wide variety of forms and types, ranging from telephone boxes and road signs, to castles. Historic England has created twenty broad categories of structures, and published selection guides for each one to aid with assessing buildings and structures. These include historical overviews and describe the special considerations for listing each category. However, in 2020, the Supreme Court ruled in Dill v Secretary of State for Housing, Communities and Local Government and another that buildings in the scheme must meet certain criteria – "a three-fold test which involved considering size, permanence and degree of physical attachment" – referred to as the Skerritts test in reference to a previous legal case in England. Both Historic Environment Scotland and Cadw produce guidance for owners.

=== Listing and delisting procedure ===
In England, to have a building considered for listing or delisting, the process is to apply to the secretary of state; this can be done by submitting an application form online to Historic England. The applicant does not need to be the owner of the building to apply for it to be listed. Full information including application form guidance notes are on the Historic England website. Historic England assesses buildings put forward for listing or delisting and provides advice to the Secretary of State on the architectural and historic interest. The Secretary of State, who may seek additional advice from others, then decides whether to list or delist the building.

== England and Wales ==
=== Legislation ===
==== England ====
In England, the authority for listing is granted to the Secretary of State by the Planning (Listed Buildings and Conservation Areas) Act 1990. Listed buildings in danger of decay are listed on the Historic England 'Heritage at Risk' Register.

In 1980, there was public outcry at the sudden destruction of the art deco Firestone Tyre Factory (Wallis, Gilbert and Partners, 1928–29). It was demolished over the August bank holiday weekend by its owners Trafalgar House, who had been told that it was likely to be 'spot-listed' a few days later. In response, the government undertook to review arrangements for listing buildings in order to protect worthy ones from such demolition. After the Firestone demolition, the Secretary of State for the Environment, Michael Heseltine, also initiated a complete re-survey of buildings to ensure that everything that merited preservation was on the lists.

In England, the Department for Culture, Media and Sport (DCMS) works with Historic England (an agency of the DCMS), and other government departments, e.g. Ministry of Housing, Communities, and Local Government (MHCLG) and the Department for Environment, Food and Rural Affairs (DEFRA) to deliver the government policy on the protection to historic buildings and other heritage assets. The decision about whether or not to list a building is made by the Secretary of State, although the process is administered in England by Historic England.

==== Wales ====
The listed building system in Wales formerly also operated under the Planning (Listed Buildings and Conservation Areas) Act 1990, as in England, until this was replaced in 2024 with Wales-specific heritage legislation.

In Wales, the authority for listing is granted to the Welsh Ministers by section 76 of the Historic Environment (Wales) Act 2023, although the listing system is in practice administered by Cadw.

=== English heritage protection reform ===
There have been several attempts to simplify the heritage planning process for listed buildings in England. As of 2021, few changes had been implemented.

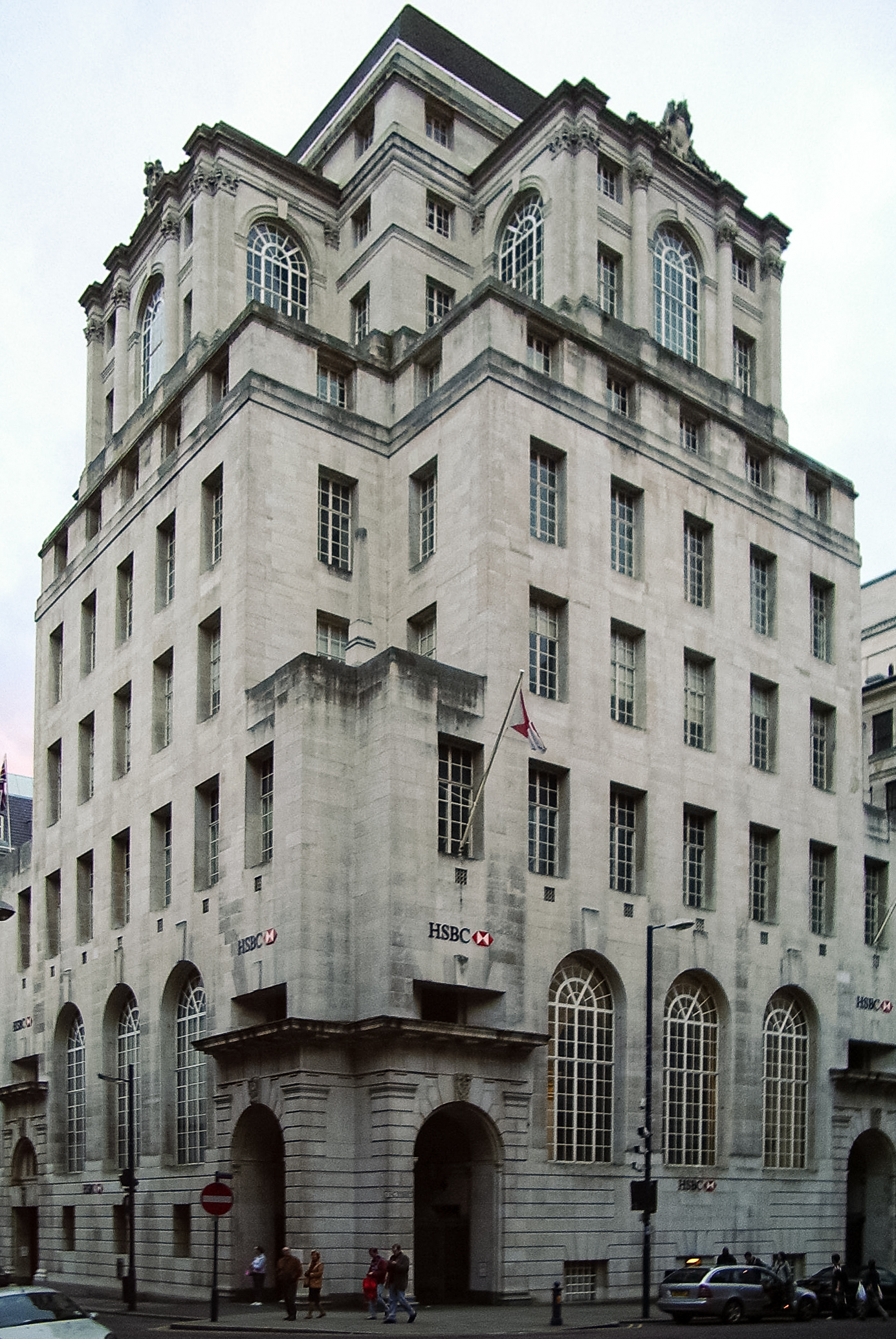
100 King Street, Manchester, built in 1935 and formerly the Midland Bank, was listed Grade II* in 1974.

The review process was started in February 2000 by Alan Howarth, then minister at the Department for Culture, Media and Sport (DCMS). The outcome was the paper "Power of Place" in December 2000, followed by the subsequent policy document, "The Historic Environment: A Force for Our Future", published by the DCMS and the Department of the Environment, Transport and the Regions (DTLR) in December 2001. The launch of the Government's Heritage Protection Reform (HPR) report in July 2003 by the DCMS, entitled "Protecting our historic environment: Making the system work better", asked questions about how the current designation systems could be improved. The HPR decision report "Review of Heritage Protection: The Way Forward", a green paper published in June 2004 by the DCMS, committed the UK government and English Heritage to a process of reform, including a review of the criteria used for listing buildings.

A Review of Heritage Policy in 2006 was criticised, and the Government began a process of consultation on changes to Planning Policy Guidance 15, relating to the principles of selection for listing buildings in England.

The government's White Paper "Heritage Protection for the 21st Century", published on 8 March 2007, offered a commitment to sharing the understanding of the historic environment and more openness in the process of designation.

In 2008, a draft Heritage Protection Bill was subject to pre-legislative scrutiny before its passage through UK Parliament. The legislation was abandoned despite strong cross-party support, to make room in the parliamentary legislative programme for measures to deal with the credit crunch, though it may be revived in future. The proposal was that the existing registers of buildings, parks and gardens, archaeology and battlefields, maritime wrecks, and World Heritage Sites be merged into a single online register that will "explain what is special and why". English Heritage would become directly responsible for identifying historic assets in England and there would be wider consultation with the public and asset owners, and new rights of appeal. There would have been streamlined systems for granting consent for work on historic assets.

After several years of consultation with heritage groups, charities, local planning authorities, and English Heritage, in March 2010, the DCLG published Planning Policy Statement 5, "Planning for the Historic Environment". This replaced PPG15 and set out the government's national policies on the conservation of the historic environment in England. PPS5 was supported by a Practice Guide, endorsed by the DCLG, the DCMS, and English Heritage, which explained how to apply the policies stated in PPS5.

In December 2010, the Department for Communities and Local Government announced that in England all PPSs and Planning Policy Guidance Notes would be replaced by a single document, the National Planning Policy Framework. A consultation draft of this was published on 25 July 2011 and the final version on 27 March 2012. This became a material consideration in planning matters on publication. It has since been revised in 2018, 2019 and 2021.

=== Categories ===
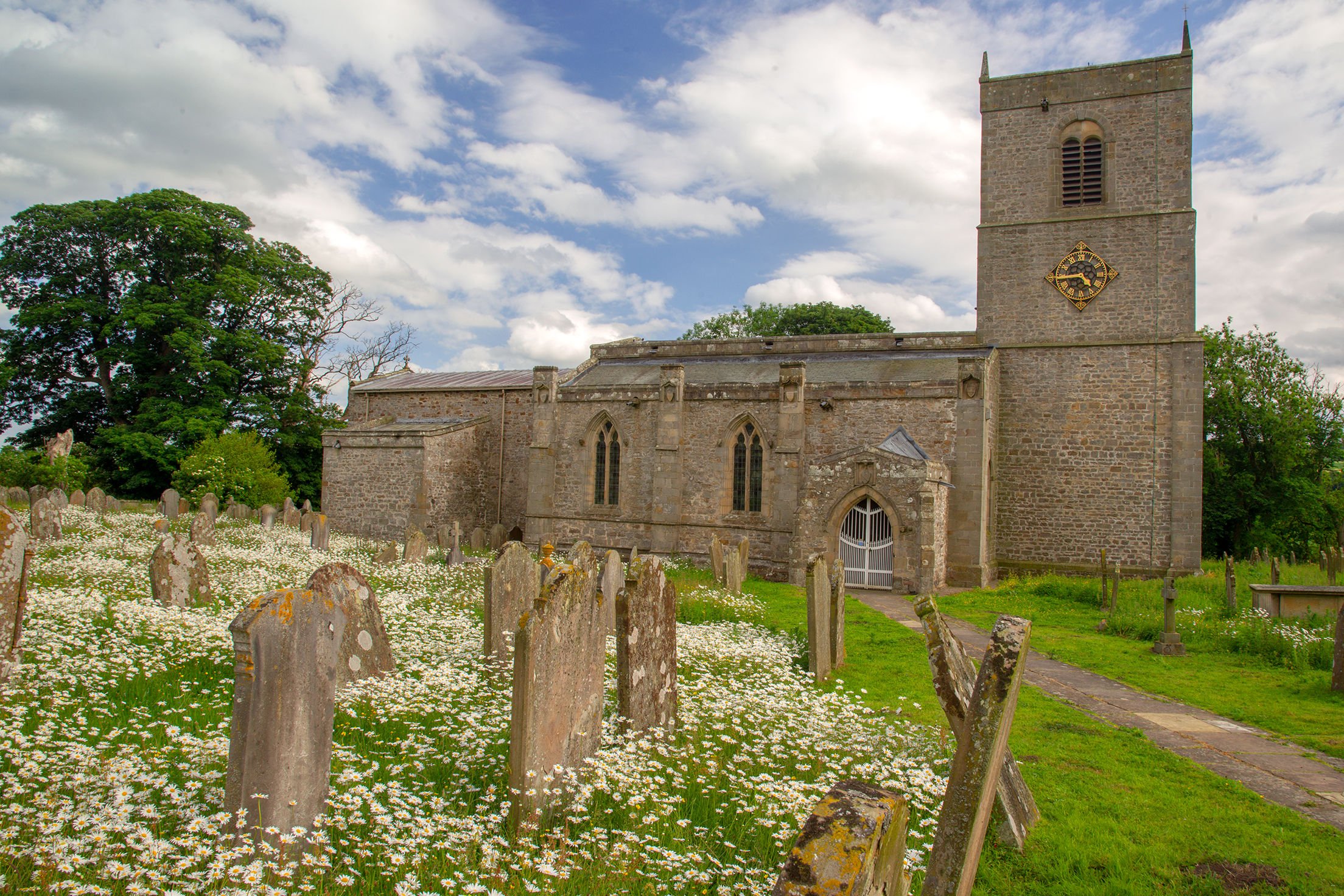
The redundant Holy Trinity Church in Wensley, North Yorkshire, is listed Grade I. Much of the current structure was built in the 14th and 15th centuries.

The Historic Buildings and Monuments Commission in England and Cadw in Wales list buildings under three grades, with Grade I being the highest grade, as follows:

- Grade I: buildings that are of exceptional interest
- Grade II*: particularly important buildings of more than special interest
- Grade II: buildings that are of special interest

There was formerly a non-statutory Grade III, which was abolished in 1970. (Note: In 2022 proposals were floated for the reintroduction of a Grade III.) Additionally, Grades A, B and C were used mainly for Anglican churches in active use, loosely corresponding to Grades I, II and III. These grades were used mainly before 1977, although a few buildings are still listed using these grades.

In 2010, listed buildings accounted for about 2% of English building stock. In March 2010, there were about 374,000 list entries, of which 92% were Grade II, 5.5% were Grade II* and 2.5% were Grade I. Places of worship are an important part of the UK's architectural heritage; England alone has 14,500 listed places of worship (4,000 Grade I, 4,500 Grade II* and 6,000 Grade II) and 45% of all Grade I listed buildings are places of worship. Some of the listed churches are no longer in use; between 1969 and 2010, some 1,795 churches were closed by the Church of England, equalling roughly 11% of the stock, with about a third listed as Grade I or Grade II.

As of 2025, there were approximately 30,000 listed buildings in Wales, of which around 91% were Grade II, around 7% were Grade II*, and less than 2% were Grade I. In total, listed buildings accounted for less than 1% of Welsh building stock.

=== Statutory criteria ===
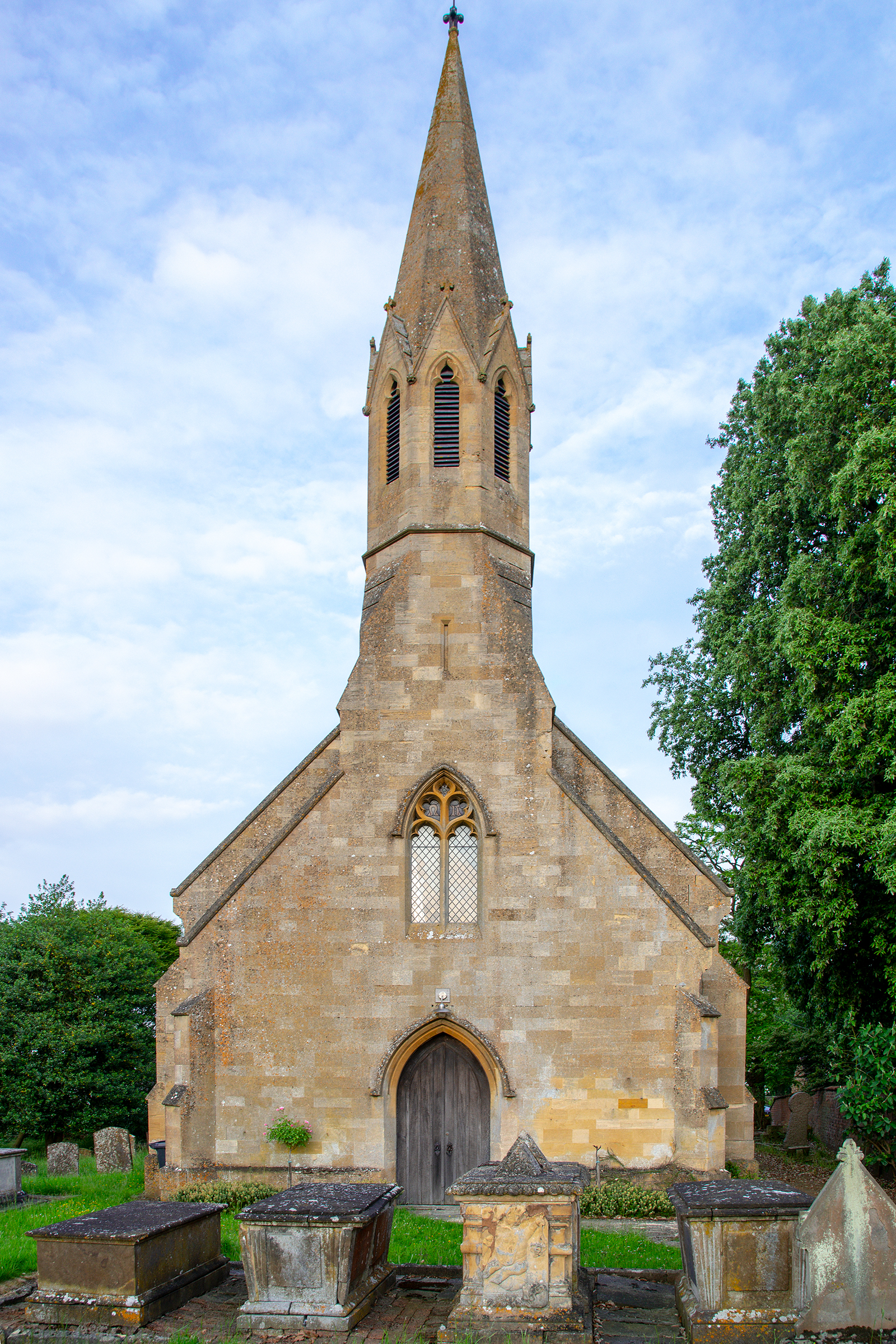
Built in 1841, St Peter's in Stretton-on-Fosse in the Cotswolds is listed Grade II.

The criteria for listing include architectural interest, historic interest and close historical associations with significant people or events. Buildings not individually noteworthy may still be listed if they form part of a group that is—for example, all the buildings in a square. This is called 'group value'. Sometimes large areas comprising many buildings may not justify listing but receive the looser protection of designation as a conservation area.

The specific criteria include:

- Age and rarity: The older a building is, the more likely it is to be listed. All buildings erected before 1700 that "contain a significant proportion of their original fabric" will be listed. Most buildings built between 1700 and 1840 are listed. After 1840 more selection is exercised and "particularly careful selection" is applied after 1945. Buildings less than 30 years old are rarely listed unless they are of outstanding quality and under threat.
- Aesthetic merits: i.e. the appearance of a building. However, buildings that have little visual appeal may be listed on grounds of representing particular aspects of social or economic history.
- Selectivity: where a large number of buildings of a similar type survive, the policy is only to list the most representative or significant examples.
- National interest: significant or distinctive regional buildings; e.g. those that represent a nationally important but localised industry.

The state of repair of a building is not generally deemed to be a relevant consideration for listing.

Additionally:

- Any buildings or structures constructed before 1 July 1948 that fall within the curtilage of a listed building are treated as part of the listed building.
- The effect of a proposed development on the setting of a listed building is a material consideration in determining a planning application. Setting is defined as "the surroundings in which a heritage is experienced".

Although the decision to list a building may be made on the basis of the architectural or historic interest of one small part of the building, the listing protection nevertheless applies to the whole building. Listing applies not just to the exterior fabric of the building itself, but also to the interior, fixtures, fittings, and objects within the curtilage of the building even if they are not fixed. De-listing is possible but is rare. One example is Anmer Hall in Norfolk, which was listed in 1984 and de-listed in 1988.

=== Emergency measure ===
In an emergency, the local planning authority can serve a temporary "Building Preservation Notice" (BPN), if a building is in danger of demolition or alteration in such a way that might affect its historic character. This remains in force for six months until the Secretary of State decides whether or not to formally list the building.

=== Certificates of immunity ===
Until 2013 in England and 2016 in Wales, an application for a Certificate of Immunity from Listing (CoI) could only be made if planning permission was being sought or had been obtained.

However, following changes brought about by the Enterprise and Regulatory Reform Act 2013 in relation to England, and the Historic Environment (Wales) Act 2016 in relation to Wales, anyone can apply to either the Secretary of State (if a building is in England) or the Welsh Government (if a building is in Wales), to issue a Certificate of Immunity in respect of that building, at any time.

=== Listed building consent ===
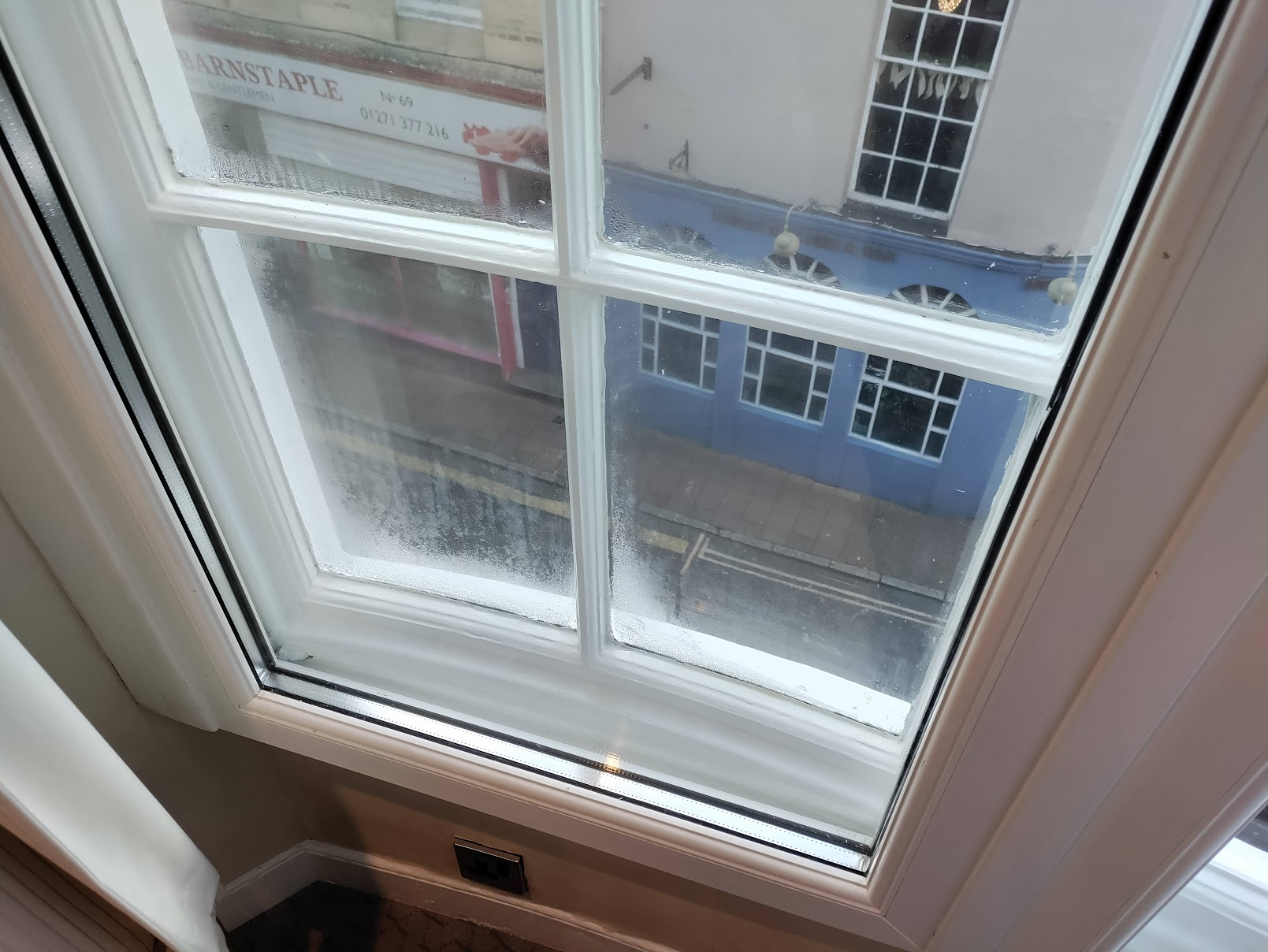
Secondary glazed windows of the Royal and Fortescue Hotel. The original facade is listed, so additional panes have been installed behind for insulation.

Listed building consent may be required for alterations to listed buildings, in addition to conventional planning permission.

In England and Wales, the management of listed buildings is the responsibility of local planning authorities and the Ministry of Housing, Communities and Local Government (i.e., not DCMS, which originally listed the building). There is a general principle that listed buildings are put to 'appropriate and viable use' and recognition that this may involve the re-use and modification of the building. However, listed buildings cannot be modified without first obtaining Listed Building Consent through the relevant local planning authority.

In Wales, applications are made using a form obtained from the relevant local authority. There is no provision for consent to be granted in outline. When a local authority is disposed to grant listed building consent, it must first notify the Welsh Parliament (i.e. Cadw) of the application. If the planning authority decides to refuse consent, it may do so without any reference to Cadw.

Carrying out unauthorised works to a listed building is a criminal offence and owners can be prosecuted. A planning authority can also insist that all work undertaken without consent be reversed at the owner's expense. Some energy efficiency works can be conducted without authorisation, where the works do not harm listed features. For example, secondary glazing is a practice where a historic, poorly insulated window can have a modern one installed behind it. This maintains the original facade while improving insulation, and does not usually require listed building consent.

=== Examples of Grade I listed buildings ===
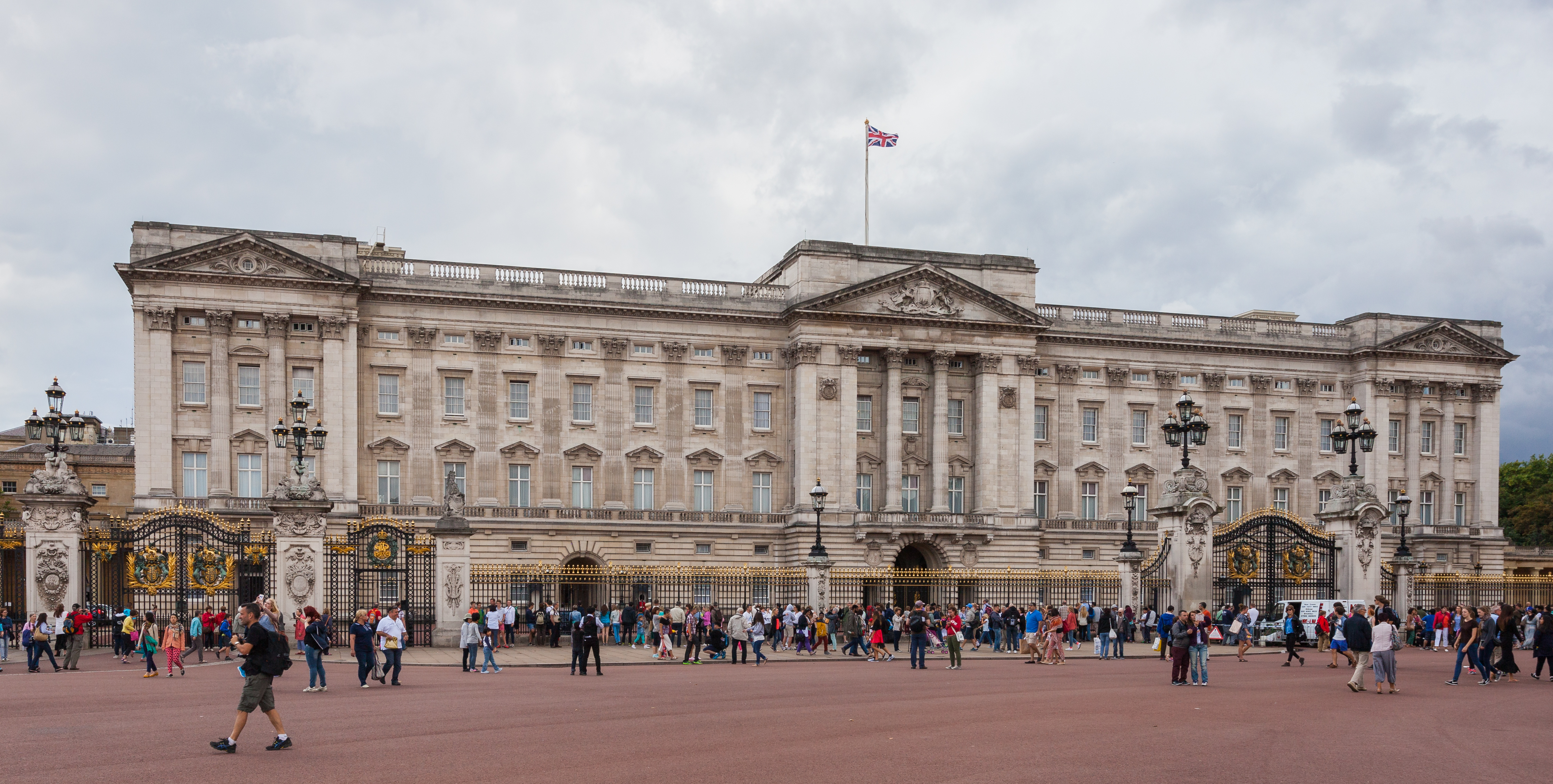
Buckingham Palace, the official London residence of the British monarch, is listed Grade I.

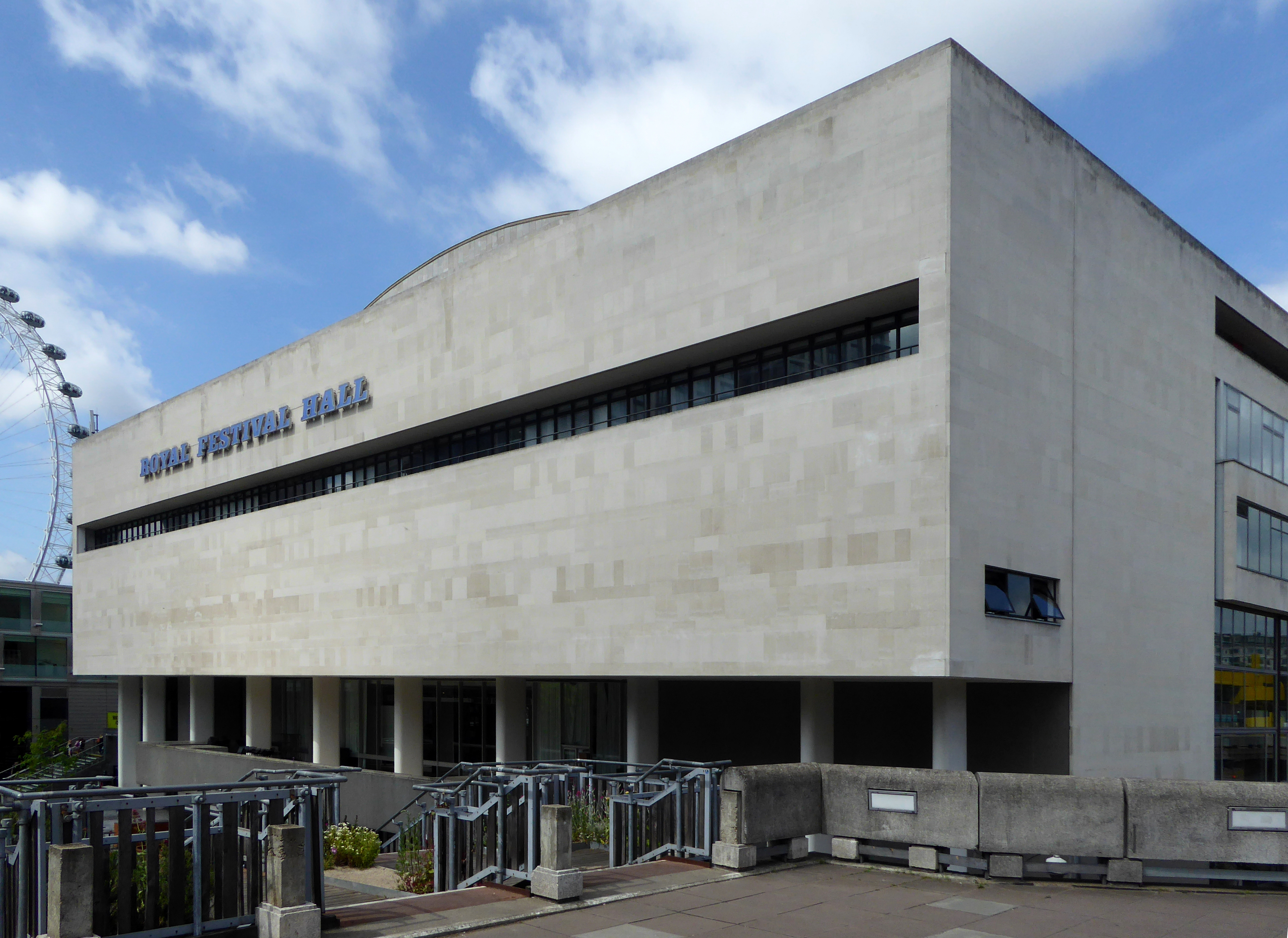
Royal Festival Hall, London, was the first postwar building to gain Grade I listed status.

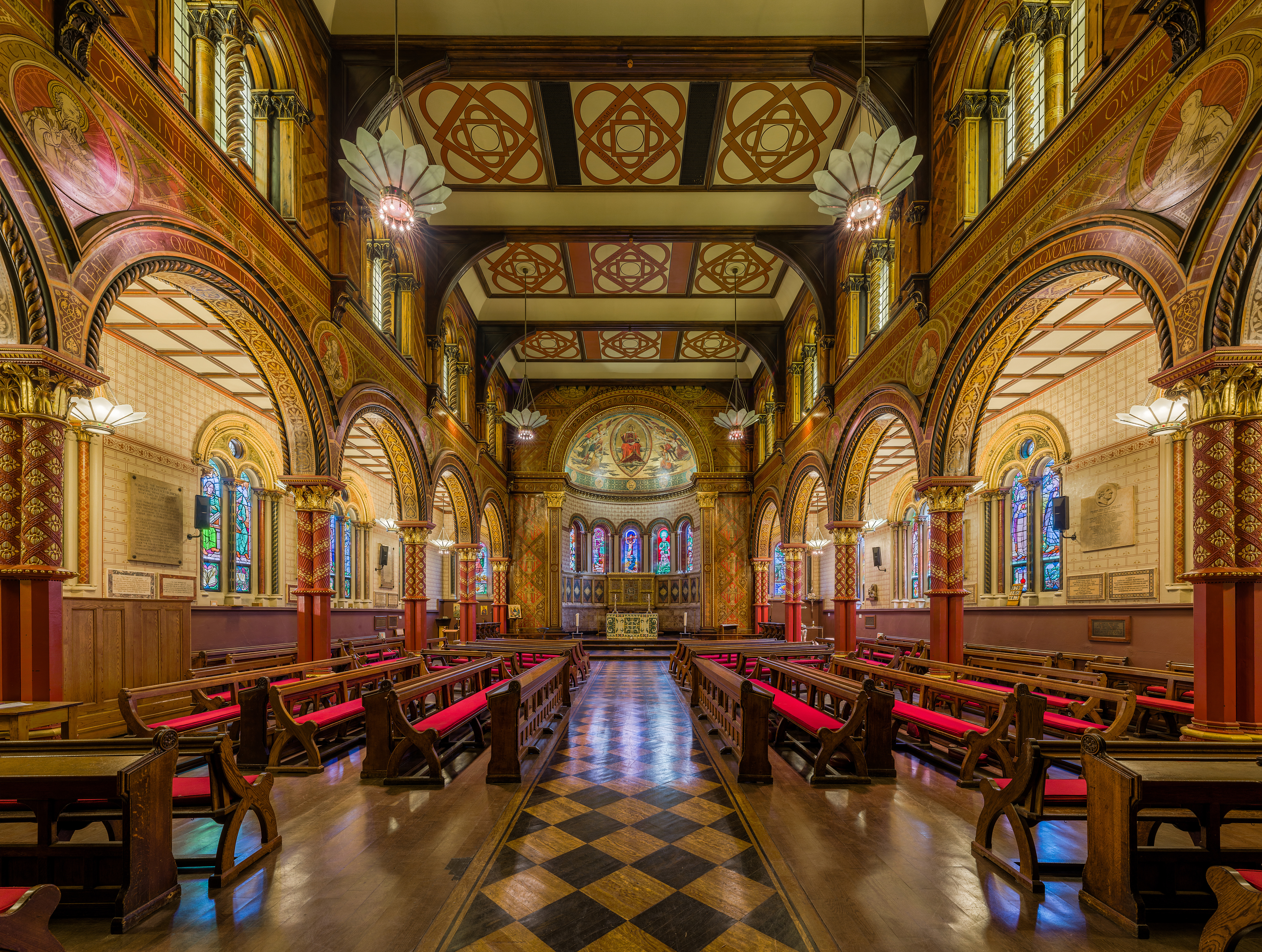
The Grade I listed King's College London Chapel on the Strand Campus was redesigned in 1864 by Sir George Gilbert Scott.

- Royal Albert Dock, Liverpool
- Birmingham Town Hall, Birmingham
- Blackpool Tower, Blackpool
- Cenotaph, London
- Chequers, Buckinghamshire
- Clifton Suspension Bridge, Bristol
- Hampton Court Palace, London
- Humber Bridge, East Riding of Yorkshire / North Lincolnshire
- Isokon Flats, Hampstead, London
- King's College London Chapel, London
- Liverpool Cathedral, Liverpool
- Liverpool Metropolitan Cathedral, Liverpool
- Lloyd's building, London
- Manchester Liverpool Road railway station, Manchester
- Montacute House, Somerset
- Norwich Castle, Norwich
- Palace of Westminster, London
- Pontcysyllte Aqueduct, North Wales
- Portchester Castle, Hampshire
- Quarr Abbey, Isle of Wight
- Tower Bridge, London
- Tower of London, London
- Warwick Castle, Warwick
- Windsor Castle, Windsor
- York Minster, York

=== Examples of Grade II* listed buildings ===
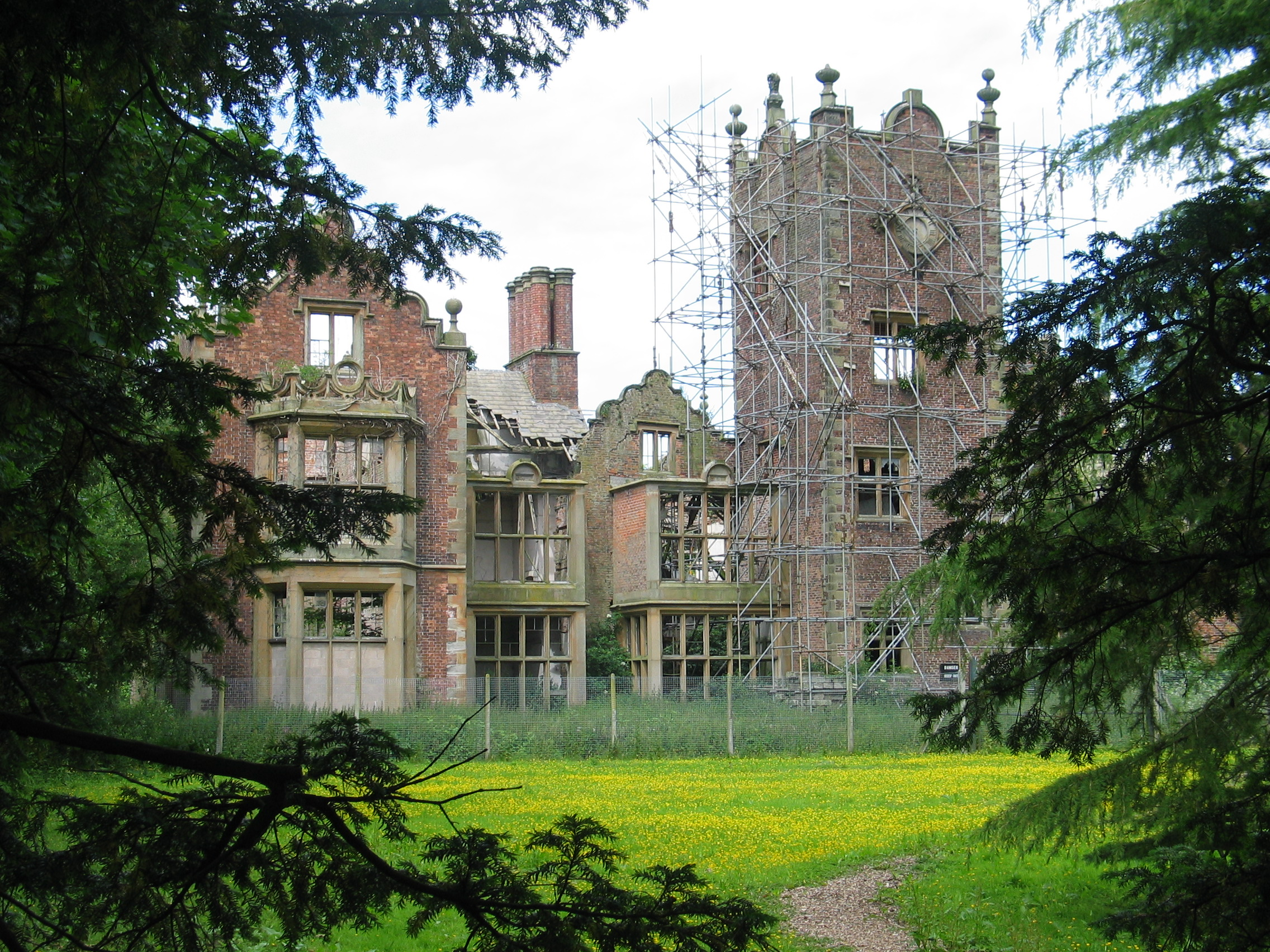
The Bank Hall mansion house in Lancashire is a Grade II* listed building because of its 17th-century clock tower, which features an original oak cantilevered staircase.

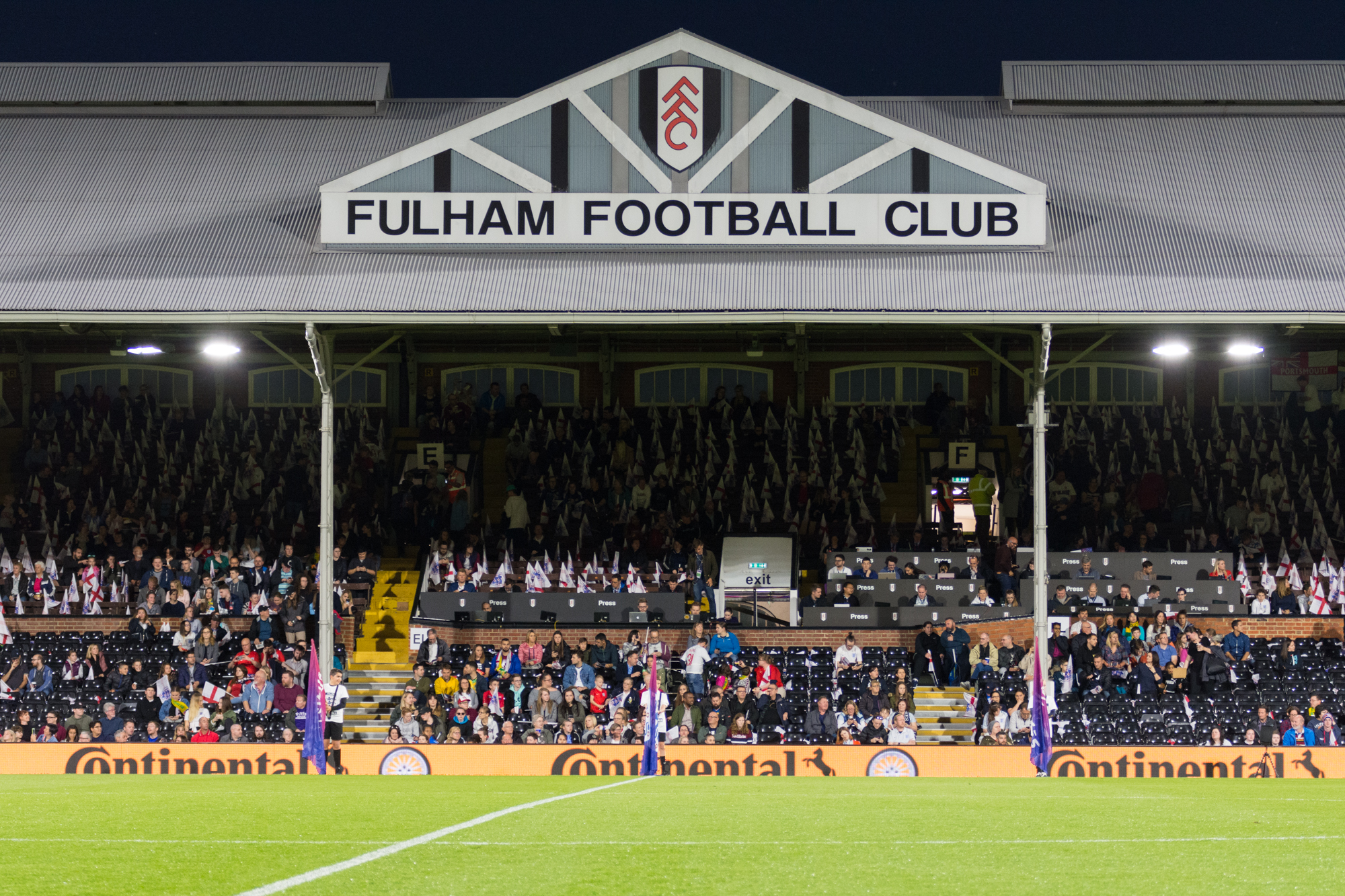
The Johnny Haynes stand at Craven Cottage is listed Grade II*.

- Battersea Power Station, London
- Capel Manor House, Horsmonden
- Cleveland Bridge, Bath
- Coliseum Theatre, London
- Downe House, Richmond Hill, London
- Manchester Town Hall Extension, Manchester
- Middlesbrough Transporter Bridge, Middlesbrough
- Middlesex Guildhall, London
- Rise Hall, Rise
- Shibden Hall, Calderdale
- St John's Jerusalem, Sutton-at-Hone, Kent
- Trellick Tower, London

=== Examples of Grade II listed buildings ===
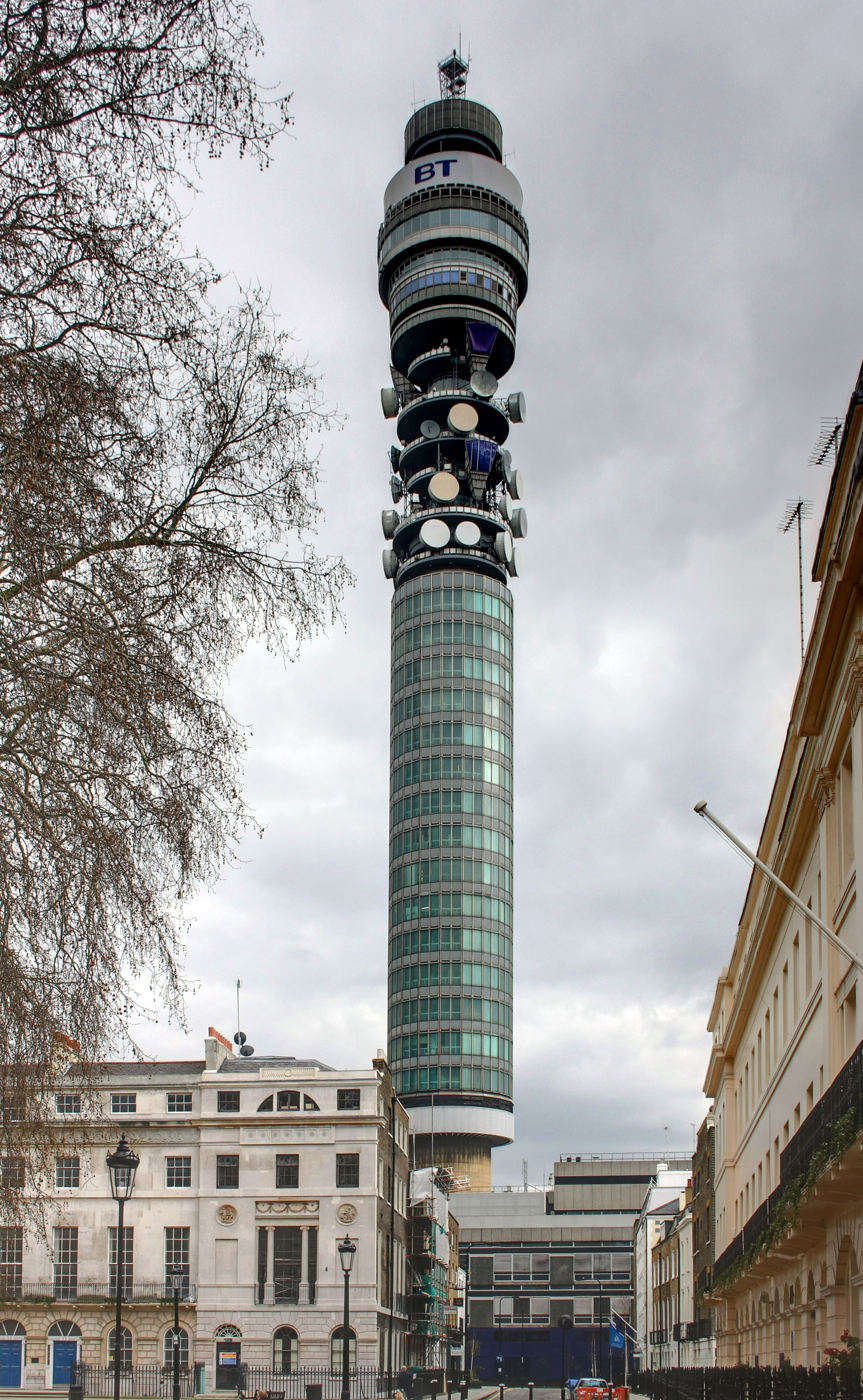
BT Tower is a Grade II listed communications tower.

- Abbey Road Studios, London
- Adelphi Hotel, Liverpool
- Broomhill Pool, Ipswich
- BT Tower, London
- Birmingham Back to Backs, Birmingham
- Bhaktivedanta Manor, Watford
- India House, London
- Kursaal, Southend-on-Sea
- Crucible Theatre, Sheffield
- Point Clear Martello Tower, Point Clear
- Southbank Centre, London
- Surbiton railway station, London
- Whitechapel Bell Foundry, London
- Footbridge just south of Wokingham railway station, Wokingham, Berkshire

=== Examples of Grade III listed buildings ===
- Rodmersham Green Windmill

=== Mixed designations ===
It is not unusual for historic sites, particularly large sites, to contain buildings with multiple, sometimes varying, designations. For example, Derwent Valley Mills, a World Heritage Site, contains 838 listed buildings, made up of 16 listed at Grade I, 42 at Grade II* and 780 at Grade II. A further nine structures are scheduled monuments.

=== Locally listed buildings ===
Many councils, for example, Birmingham City Council and Crawley Borough Council, maintain a list of non-designated heritage assets (known informally as locally listed buildings) as separate to the statutory list (and in addition to it). There is no statutory protection of a building or object on the local heritage list but the National Planning Policy Framework states that "the effect of an application on the significance of a non-designated heritage asset should be taken into account". Many also receive a degree of protection from loss through being in a conservation area or through planning policy.

== Northern Ireland ==
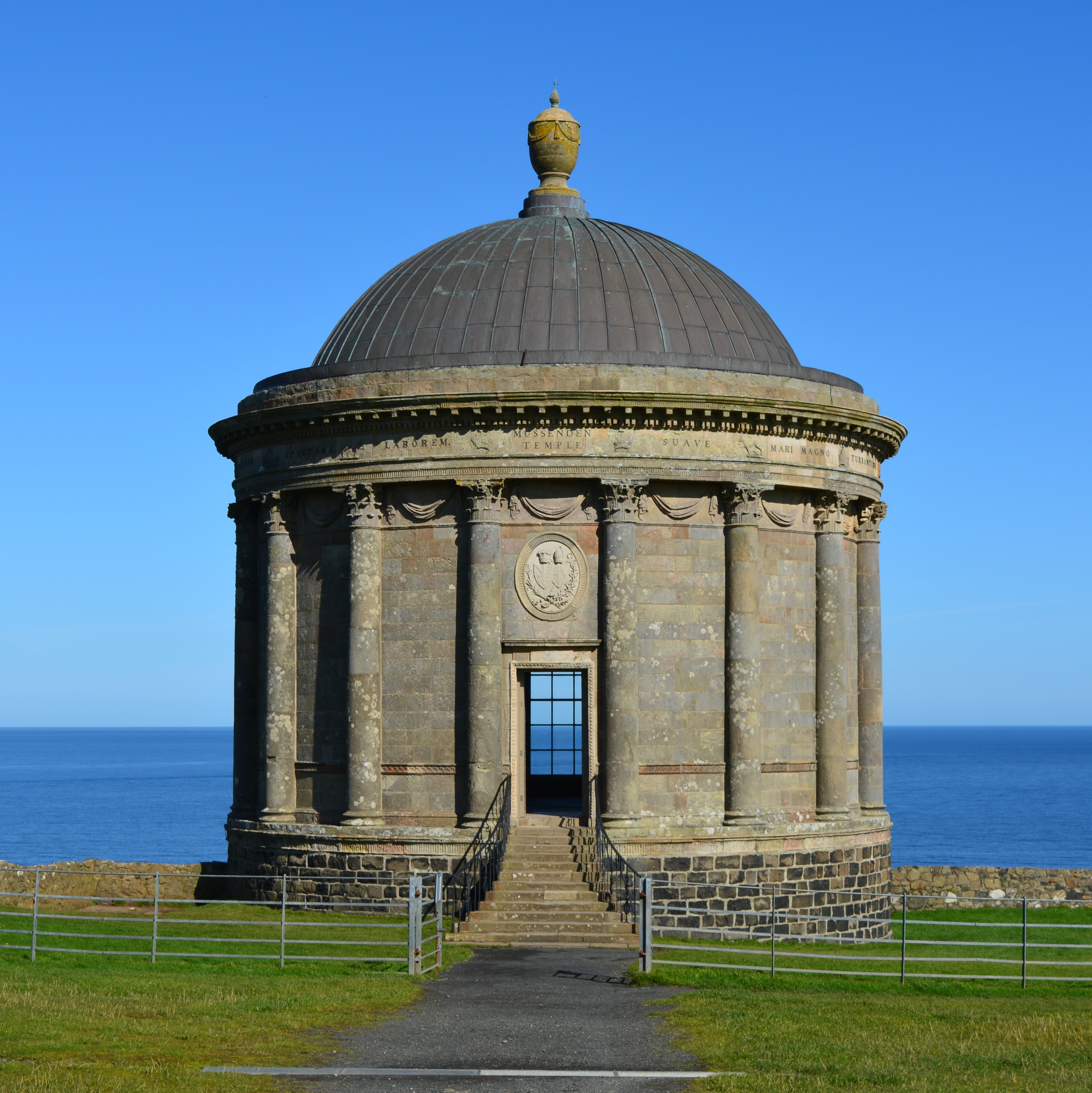
The Grade-A-listed Mussenden Temple, County Londonderry

=== Background and overview ===
Listing began later in Northern Ireland than in the rest of the UK: the first provision for listing was contained in the Planning (Northern Ireland) Order 1972; and the current legislative basis for listing is the Planning (Northern Ireland) Order 1991. Under Article 42 of the Order, the relevant Department of the Northern Ireland Executive is required to compile lists of buildings of "special architectural or historic interest". Since 2016, the responsibility for the listing process rests with the Historic Environment Division of the Department for Communities, which took over the built heritage functions of the Northern Ireland Environment Agency (formerly the Environment and Heritage Service) following the break up of the Department of the Environment.

Following the introduction of listing, an initial survey of Northern Ireland's building stock was begun in 1974. By the time of the completion of this First Survey in 1994, the listing process had developed considerably, and it was therefore decided to embark upon a Second Survey, which is still ongoing, to update and cross-check the original information. Information gathered during this survey, relating to both listed and unlisted buildings, is entered into the publicly accessible Northern Ireland Buildings Database.

A range of listing criteria, which aim to define architectural and historic interest, are used to determine whether or not to list a building. Listed building consent must be obtained from local authorities before any alteration to a listed structure. There are about 8,500 listed buildings in Northern Ireland.

=== Categories ===
The listed building system in Northern Ireland contains four grades, defined as follows:

- Grade A: "buildings of greatest importance to Northern Ireland including both outstanding architectural set-pieces and the least altered examples of each representative style, period and type."
- Grade B+: "high quality buildings that because of exceptional features, interiors or environmental qualities are clearly above the general standard set by grade B1 buildings. Also buildings which might have merited Grade A status but for detracting features such as an incomplete design, lower quality additions or alterations."
- Grade B1: "good examples of a particular period or style. A degree of alteration or imperfection of design may be acceptable. Generally B1 is chosen for buildings that qualify for listing by virtue of a relatively wide selection of attributes. Usually these will include interior features or where one or more features are of exceptional quality and/or interest."
- Grade B2: "special buildings which meet the test of the legislation. A degree of alteration or imperfection of design may be acceptable. B2 is chosen for buildings that qualify for listing by virtue of only a few attributes. An example would be a building sited within a conservation area where the quality of its architectural appearance or interior raises it appreciably above the general standard of buildings within the conservation area."

=== Examples of Grade A listed buildings ===
- Belfast Castle
- Gosford Castle, County Armagh
- Grand Opera House, Belfast

=== Examples of Grade B+ listed buildings ===
- Necarne, County Fermanagh
- Scrabo Tower, Newtownards

=== Examples of Grade B1 listed buildings ===
- Bank Buildings, Belfast
- Campbell College, Belfast
- Old Bushmills Distillery, County Antrim

== Scotland ==
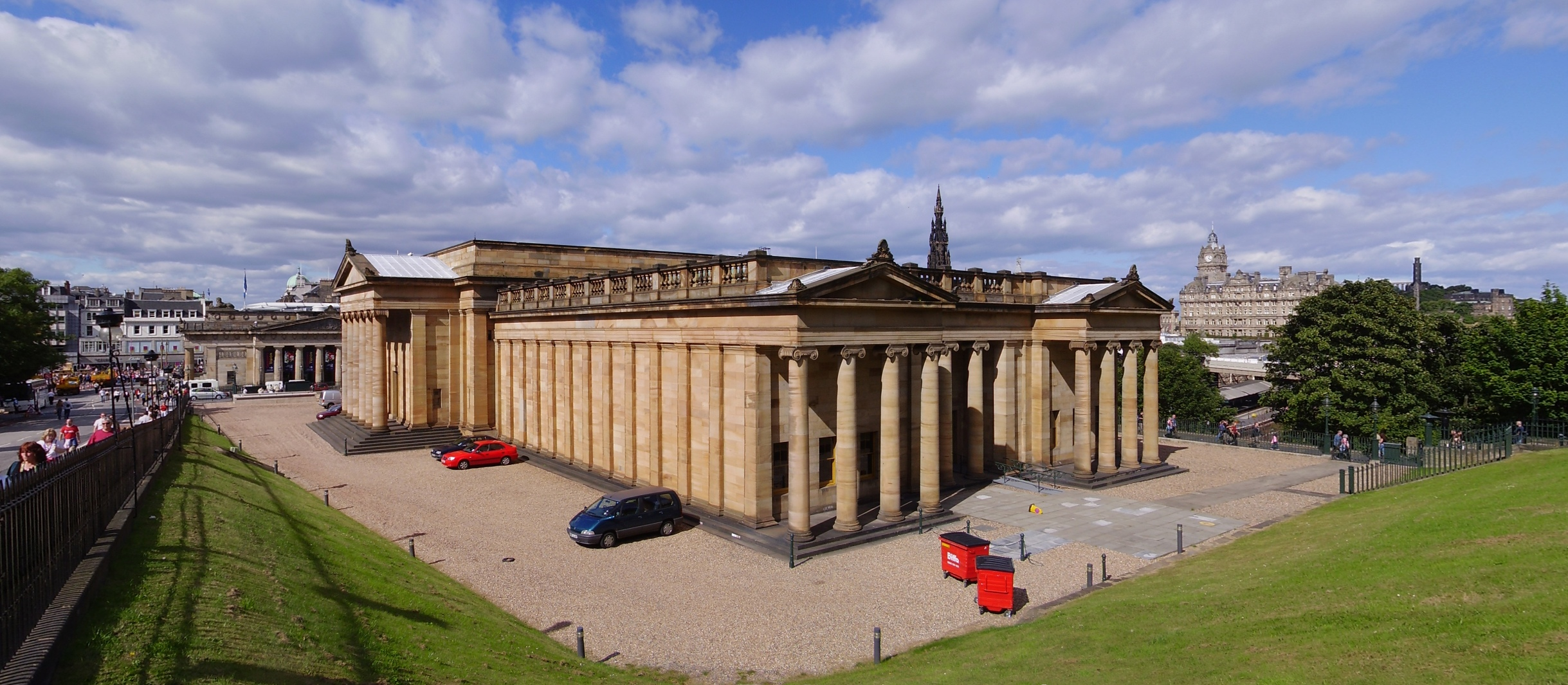
The National Gallery of Scotland, Edinburgh, designed by William Henry Playfair, is a Category A listed building.

=== Background and overview ===
In Scotland, listing was begun by a provision in the Town and Country Planning (Scotland) Act 1947, and the current legislative basis for listing is the Planning (Listed Buildings and Conservation Areas) (Scotland) Act 1997. As with other matters regarding planning, conservation is a power devolved to the Scottish Parliament and the Scottish Government. The authority for listing rests with Historic Environment Scotland (formerly Historic Scotland), an executive agency of the Scottish Government, which inherited this role from the Scottish Development Department in 1991. The listing system is administered by Historic Environment Scotland on behalf of the Scottish Ministers.

Listed building consent must be obtained from local authorities before any alteration to a listed structure. Applications for consent are made on a form obtained from Historic Environment Scotland. After consulting the local planning authority, the owner, where possible, and an independent third party, Historic Environment Scotland makes a recommendation on behalf of the Scottish Ministers.

=== Categories ===
The scheme for classifying buildings is:

- Category A: "Buildings of special architectural or historic interest which are outstanding examples of a particular period, style or building type."
- Category B: "Buildings of special architectural or historic interest which are major examples of a particular period, style or building type."
- Category C: "Buildings of special architectural or historic interest which are representative examples of a period, style or building type."

There are about 47,400 listed buildings in Scotland. Of these, around 8 per cent (some 3,800) are Category A, 60 per cent are Category B, and 32 per cent are listed at Category C.

=== Examples of Category A listed buildings ===
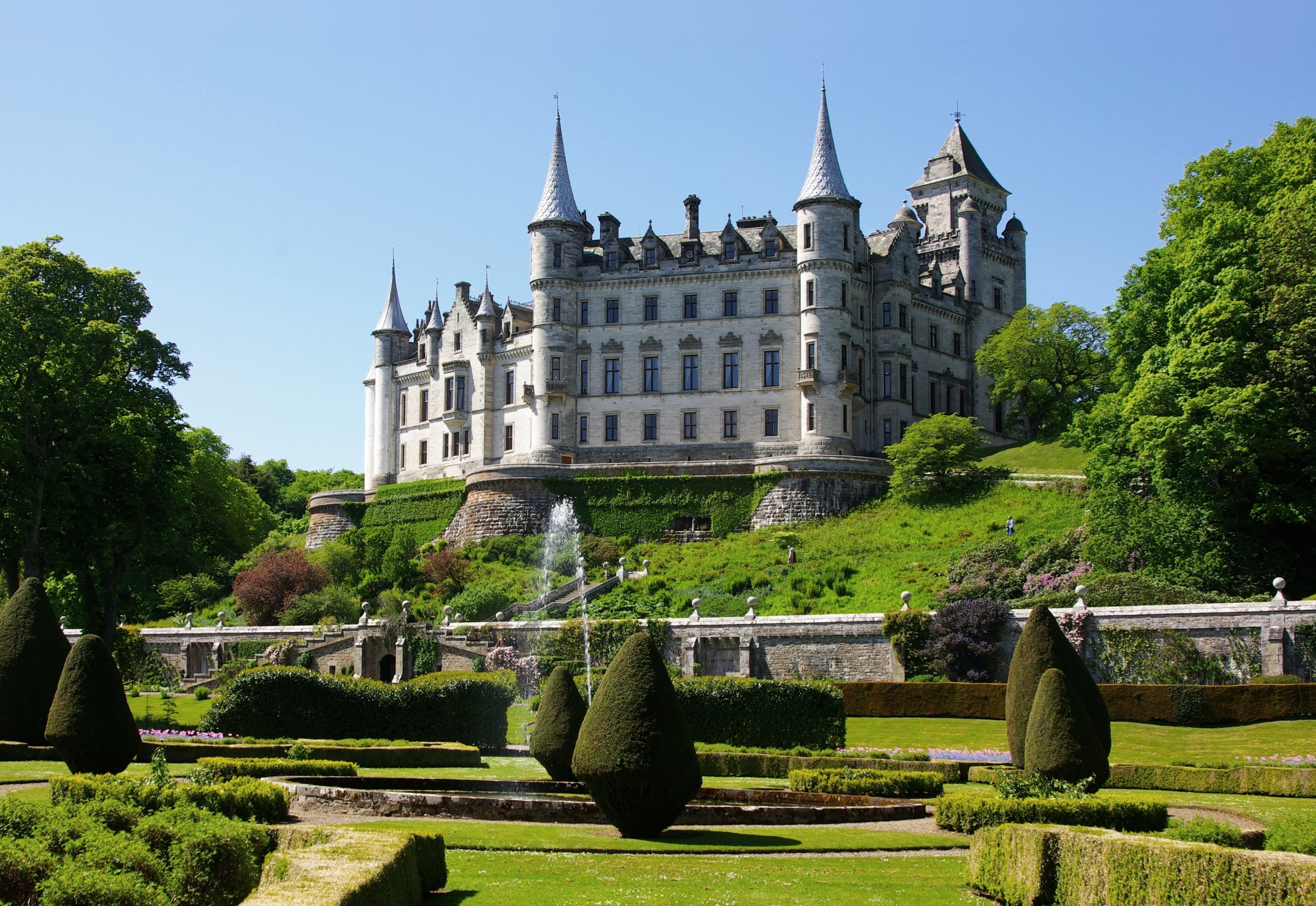
Dunrobin Castle is Category A listed.

- 1 Prince's Terrace, Glasgow
- Craigellachie Bridge, Moray
- Glasgow Cathedral, Glasgow
- Glasgow City Chambers, Glasgow
- The Kirna, Walkerburn
- Palace of Holyroodhouse, Edinburgh
- Ravelston Garden, Edinburgh
- St Peter's Seminary, Cardross

=== Examples of Category B listed buildings ===
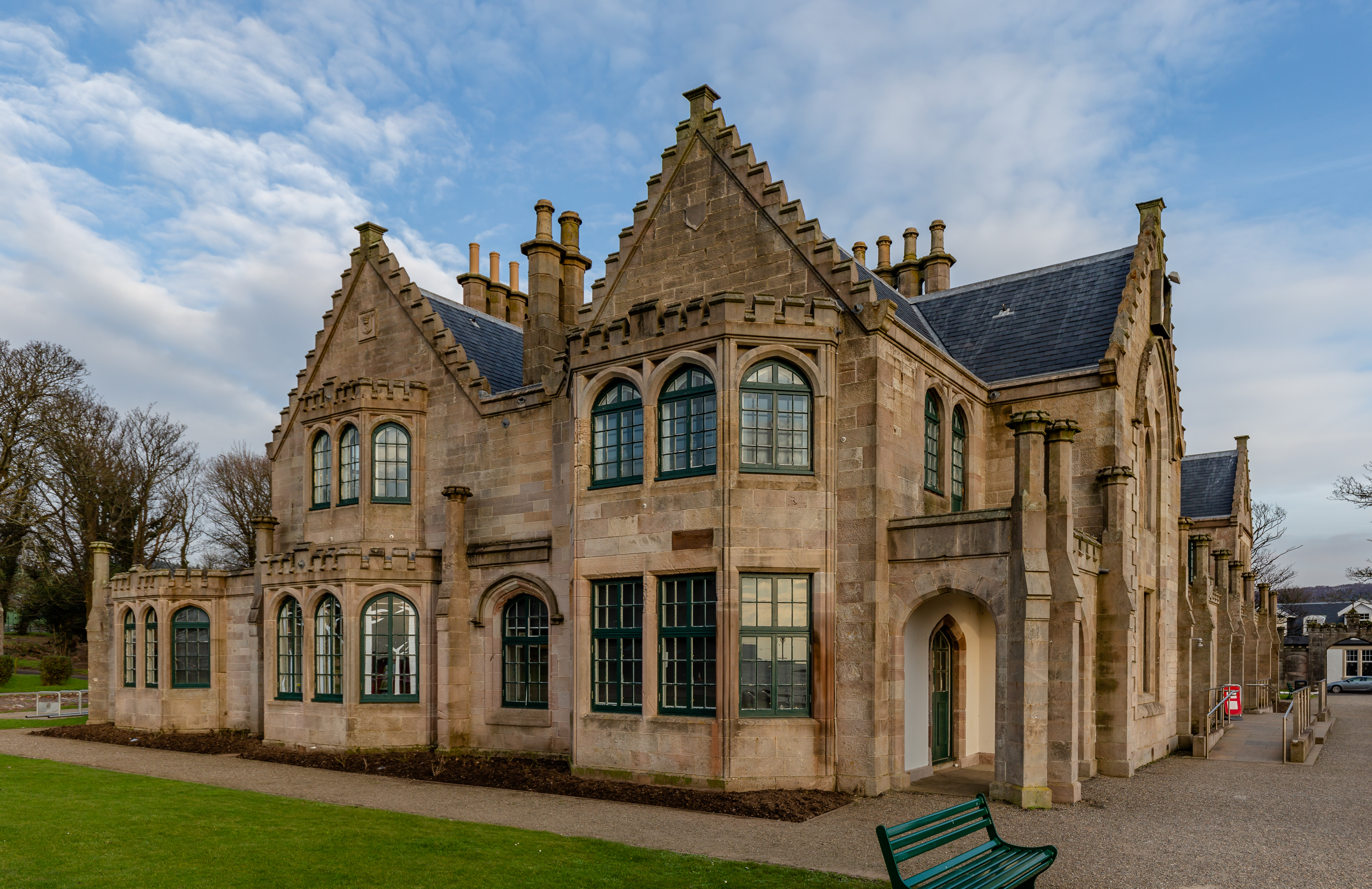
The 18th century Garrison House in Millport, Cumbrae, is Category B listed.

- Balmoral Hotel, Edinburgh
- Harbourmaster's House, Dysart, Fife
- Perth Theatre, Perth
- Sabhal Mòr Ostaig, Isle of Skye
- Torloisk House, Isle of Mull

=== Examples of Category C listed buildings ===
- The Belmont Cinema, Aberdeen
- Craigend Castle, East Dunbartonshire
- The George Cinema, Portobello, Edinburgh
- St John's Cathedral, Oban, Argyll

== Records ==
=== England ===
Although the 2008 draft legislation was abandoned, Historic England (then part of English Heritage) published a single list of all designated heritage assets within England in 2011. The National Heritage List for England is an online searchable database which includes 400,000 English Listings, this includes individual listed buildings, groups of multiple listed buildings which share the same listing, scheduled monuments, registered parks and gardens, protected historic wrecks and registered battlefields and World Heritage Sites in one place. The 400,000 in the listing should not be confused with the actual number of listed buildings, which will be much larger than the listing, because a listing can include more than one building that share the same listing number. The legislative frameworks for each type of historic asset remains unchanged. A photographic library of English listed buildings was started in 1999 as a snapshot of buildings listed at the turn of the millennium. This is not an up-to-date record of all listed buildings in England – the listing status and descriptions are only correct as at February 2001. The photographs were taken between 1999 and 2008. It is maintained by the Historic England archive at the Images of England project website. The National Heritage List for England contains the up-to-date list of listed buildings.

Listed buildings in danger of being lost through damage or decay in England were first recorded by survey in 1991. This was extended in 1998 with the publication of Historic England's Buildings at Risk Register which surveyed Grade I and Grade II* buildings. In 2008 this survey was renamed Heritage at Risk and extended to include all listed buildings, scheduled monuments, registered parks and gardens, registered battlefields, protected wreck sites and conservation areas. The register is compiled by survey using information from local authorities, official and voluntary heritage groups and the general public. It is possible to search this list online.

=== Scotland ===
In Scotland, the national dataset of listed buildings and other heritage assets can be searched online via Historic Environment Scotland, or through the map database Pastmap. A Buildings at Risk Register for Scotland was started in 1990 by Historic Scotland in response to similar concerns at the number of listed buildings that were vacant and in disrepair. RCAHMS maintained the register on behalf of Historic Scotland, and provided information on properties of architectural or historic merit throughout the country that are considered to be at risk. Since the merger of these two bodies into one, that work is now carried out by Historic Environment Scotland.

=== Wales ===
Cadw publishes and maintains a searchable map database for listed buildings in Wales. In Wales, at risk registers of listed buildings are compiled by local planning authorities, and Cadw produced a report in 2009. The Royal Commission on the Ancient and Historical Monuments of Wales' (RCAHMW) Emergency Buildings Recording team is responsible for surveying historic buildings threatened with destruction, substantial alteration, or serious decay.

=== Northern Ireland ===
The Northern Ireland Buildings Database contains details of all listed buildings in Northern Ireland.

=== Other ===
The website British Listed Buildings Online has sections on England, Wales and Scotland. It can be searched either by browsing for listed buildings by country, county and parish/locality, or by keyword search or via the online map. Not all buildings have photographs, as it is run on a volunteer basis.

== Equivalent status outside the United Kingdom ==
For other countries' equivalents see List of heritage registers.

== See also ==
- Conservation area (United Kingdom)
- The Georgian Group
- Grade I listed buildings in England by county
- Grade II* listed buildings in England by county
- Grade II listed buildings in England by county
- Historic England Archive
- Images of England
- Register of Historic Parks and Gardens of special historic interest in England
- Scheduled monument
- Site of Special Scientific Interest
- Tree preservation order
