= PPS 23 =

Planning Policy Statement 23: Planning and Pollution Control commonly abbreviated as PPS 23, was a document produced by the British Government and intended to complement the new pollution control framework under the Pollution Prevention and Control Act 1999 and the PPC Regulations 2000.

The statement was introduced in November 2004 and replaced Revised PPG 23: Planning and Pollution Control (published 1994).

The statement states that any consideration of air quality that impacts on health is capable of being considered a material consideration, for planning purposes.

== See also ==
- Planning Policy Statements
- Town and country planning in the United Kingdom
- Planning and Compulsory Purchase Act 2004
