= PPS 6 =

Planning Policy Statement 6
- ISBN: 0117539392
- OCLC: 224555617
- Dewey Decimal: 711.0941
- Website: www.nrpf.org.uk/PDF/PPS%206%20-%202005.pdf

Planning Policy Statement 6: Planning for Town Centres (PPS 6) is a document produced by the British Government to advise Local planning authorities on planning for the future of town centres.

It was introduced in March 2005, though it was first published in draft form in December 2003.

It replaced Planning Policy Guidance Note 6 (PPG 6): Town Centres and Retail Developments.

== See also ==
- Planning Policy Statements
- Town and country planning in the United Kingdom
- Planning and Compulsory Purchase Act 2004
