= PPS 22 =

Planning policy document

Planning Policy Statement 22: Renewable Energy commonly abbreviated as PPS 22, is a document produced by the British Government which sets out the Government's policies for renewable energy, which local planning authorities should have regard to when preparing local development documents and when taking planning decisions.

The statement was introduced in August 2004 and replaced Revised PPG 22.

The statement applied to solar, wind, tidal, hydropower and biomass energy.

== See also ==
- Planning Policy Statements
- Town and country planning in the United Kingdom
- Planning and Compulsory Purchase Act 2004
- The Merton Rule
