= PPS 7 =

Planning Policy Statement 7: Sustainable Development in Rural Areas commonly abbreviated as PPS 7, is a document produced by the British Government to advise local planning authorities on policies for rural areas.

It was introduced in August 2004. It replaced Revised PPG 7: The Countryside - Environmental Quality and Economic and Social Development.

Clause 11 of the statement, known as "country house clause" supported the development of a new isolated house, in certain situations. It was an exception to the general rule banning rural development.

The guidance acknowledged that occupational dwellings may be necessary in isolated locations in certain situations.

== See also ==
- Planning Policy Statements
- Town and country planning in the United Kingdom
- Planning and Compulsory Purchase Act 2004
