= PPS 10 =

2005 UK Government waste policy document

Planning Policy Statement 10: Planning for Sustainable Waste Management commonly abbreviated as PPS 10, is a document produced by the UK Government and forms part of the National Waste Management Plan for the United Kingdom.

The statement was introduced in July 2005 and replaced Revised PPG 10: Planning and Waste Management.

The statement was published alongside two other policy documents: Guidance on the Preparation of Municipal Waste Management Strategies and Changes to Decision-making Principles in Waste Strategy 2000.

The statement was replaced by the National Planning Policy for Waste in 2014.

The statement emphasises the need for integration between municipal waste management strategies and planning processes, regional policies and national policies.

== See also ==
- Category:Waste management
- Planning Policy Statements
- Town and country planning in the United Kingdom
- Planning and Compulsory Purchase Act 2004
- Waste management
