= PPS 25 =

Planning Policy Statement 25, commonly abbreviated as PPS 25, is a document produced by the British Government and intended to set out policy on development and flood risk.

PPS25 was published in December 2006 and has been supplemented with a practice guide. The statement was folded into the National Planning Policy Framework.

In Northern Ireland Planning Policy Statement 15: Planning and Flood Risk applies

PPS25 defines caravans intended for permanent residential occupation as a highly vulnerable use.

== See also ==
- Planning Policy Statements
- Town and country planning in the United Kingdom
- Planning and Compulsory Purchase Act 2004
- Rivers Agency
- Floods directive
