= Unitary development plan =

In United Kingdom planning law, a unitary development plan (UDP) is a development plan prepared by a metropolitan district council, London borough council or some unitary local authorities. Since the Planning and Compulsory Purchase Act 2004 they are no longer produced. Although superseded, unitary development plans and policies continue to form part of current planning in some places.

== Background ==
UDPs were introduced by the Local Government Act 1985. The "unitary" refers to the unitary nature of plan-making after the strategic authorities—the Greater London Council and metropolitan county councils—had been abolished in 1986. UDPs contained two parts. Part I contained policies equivalent to those in a structure plan and Part II those in a local plan.

== Purpose ==
An example statement describing the purpose of a UDP from Salford City Council:

The unitary development plan (UDP) is a statutory document that sets out the council's planning policies that will be used to guide development, conservation, regeneration and environmental improvement activity in Salford.

== Replacement ==
UDPs were produced up to around 2004. The Planning and Compulsory Purchase Act 2004 replaced them with local plans. Transitional arrangements meant that plans continued to be in effect. As of 2026, Leeds City Council has a still-in-effect UDP. Stockport Metropolitan Borough Council continues to have "saved" UDP policies as part of its current development plan.
