= Planning policy guidance notes =

In the United Kingdom, Planning Policy Guidance Notes (PPG) were statements of the Government's national policy and principles towards certain aspects of the town planning framework. They were material considerations in the determination of planning applications. Under the provisions of the Planning and Compulsory Purchase Act 2004, PPGs were gradually being replaced by Planning Policy Statements (PPS). In recent years prior to their withdrawal they applied to England only.

On 27 March 2012 they were replaced by the National Planning Policy Framework (NPPF). The last PPGs in force until March 2012 were:

- Planning Policy Guidance 2: Green Belt
- Planning Policy Guidance 8: Telecommunications
- Planning Policy Guidance 13: Transport
- Planning Policy Guidance 14: Development on Unstable Land
- Planning Policy Guidance 17: Planning for Open Space, Sport and Recreation
- Planning Policy Guidance 18: Enforcing Planning Control
- Planning Policy Guidance 19: Outdoor Advertisement Control
- Planning Policy Guidance 20: Coastal Planning
- Planning Policy Guidance 24: Planning and Noise

== Planning Policy Guidance 2: Green belts (1995 to 2012) ==
PPG 2 was a document produced by the British Government to advise local planning authorities on national green belt policy and its consideration in the formation of local plans. The last version was introduced in March 2001 (original) and replaced Planning Policy Guidance (PPG) Note 2 Green belts published in January 1995.

1. States the general intentions of Green Belt policy, including its contribution to sustainable development objectives
2. Reaffirms the specific purposes of including land in Green Belts, with slight modifications, gives policy a more positive thrust by specifying for the first time objectives for the use of land in Green Belts
3. Confirms that Green Belts must be protected as far as can be seen ahead, advises on defining boundaries and on safeguarding land for longer-term development needs
4. Maintains the presumption against inappropriate development within Green Belts and refines the categories of appropriate development, including making provision for the future of major existing developed sites and revising policy on the re-use of buildings.

== Planning Policy Guidance 3: Housing (1992-2006) ==
PPG 3 advised local planning authorities on the treatment of housing within the planning process. The last version was introduced in March 2000 following the Rogers Report and replaced the 1992 version. Two updates were published on 24 January 2005 - Planning Policy Guidance 3: Housing: Planning for sustainable communities in rural areas and Planning Policy Guidance 3: Housing: Supporting the delivery of new housing.

PPG3 was introduced to steer policy away from the development of large, spacious houses on greenfield sites, towards higher density development using brownfield or urban sites wherever possible. It also sought to compel developers to provide a greater element of affordable housing. Because of the slow speed at which local planning authorities' local plans were updated – and the recent changes to the planning system which abolished local plans in favour of Local Development Frameworks – local policy is often at variance with PPG3, resulting in confusion and a higher incidence of planning appeals.

PPG3 was replaced with Planning Policy Statement 3 (PPS3) in November 2006.

== Planning Policy Guidance 15: Planning and the Historic Environment (1990 to 2010) ==
PPG 15 advised local planning authorities on the treatment of historic buildings and the wider historic environment within the planning process. It was introduced in November 1990 following public outcry after a number of high-profile scandals such as the threatened destruction of the Rose Theatre in London by developers. It replaced the earlier Circular 8/87 which was criticised for being ill-focused in both practical and geographical terms. Circulars 01/2001 and 09/2005, which discuss arrangements for handling heritage applications and that amend the existing PPG 15: Planning and the historic environment, were published September 1994.

PPG 15 as cancelled and superseded in 2010 by Planning Policy Statement 5: Planning and the Historic Environment.

== Planning Policy Guidance 16: Archaeology and Planning (1990 to 2010) ==
Originally published in 1990, PPG16 was replaced by PPS 5 in 2010.

== Planning Policy Guidance 24: Planning and Noise (1994 to 2012) ==
PPG24 Planning and Noise was published in 1994. Noise assessments are normally requested as part of local council planning procedure. Noise tests should be conducted with a Class I noise meter for accurate results. Average noise levels (LAeq) are measured over a full 24-hour cycle - 16 hour (0700 - 2300) daytime, and 8 hour (2300 - 0700) night time. LAeq dB results provide a mean arithmetic average (dB(A)) which fall into a Noise Exposure Category (A, B, C or D), with categories B and C are usually passed with suitable noise mitigation measures put into place.

A - Noise need not be taken as a determining factor in granting planning permission, although the noise level at the high end of the category should not be regarded as a desirable level.

B - Noise should be taken into account when determining planning applications and, where appropriate, conditions imposed to ensure an adequate level of protection against noise.

C - Planning permission should not normally be granted. Where it is considered that permission should be given, for example because there are no alternative sites available, conditions should be imposed to ensure a commensurate level of protection against noise.

D - Planning Permission should normally be refused.

== Older PPG ==
PPG1
General Policy and Principles (revised 1997)
PPG4
Industrial and Commercial Development and Small Firms (1992)
PPG5
Simplified Planning Zones (1992)
PPG6
Town Centres and Retail Developments (revised 1996)
PPG 7
The Countryside - Environmental Quality and Economic and Social Development (February 1997)
PPG8
Telecommunications (1992)
PPG9
Nature Conservation (1994)
PPG12
Development Plans and Regional Planning Guidance (1992)
PPG13
Transport (1994)
PPG14
Development on Unstable Land (1990)
PPG17
Sport and Recreation (1991)
PPG18
Enforcing Planning Control (1991)
PPG19
Outdoor Advertisement Control (1992)
PPG20
Coastal Planning (1992)
PPG21
Tourism (1992)
PPG22
Renewable Energy (1993)
PPG23
Planning and Pollution Control (1994)

== See also ==
- Planning Policy Statements
- Town and country planning in the United Kingdom
- Town and Country Planning Act 1990
- Planning and Compulsory Purchase Act 2004
