= Slobodan P. Simonović =

Serbian-Canadian civil engineer

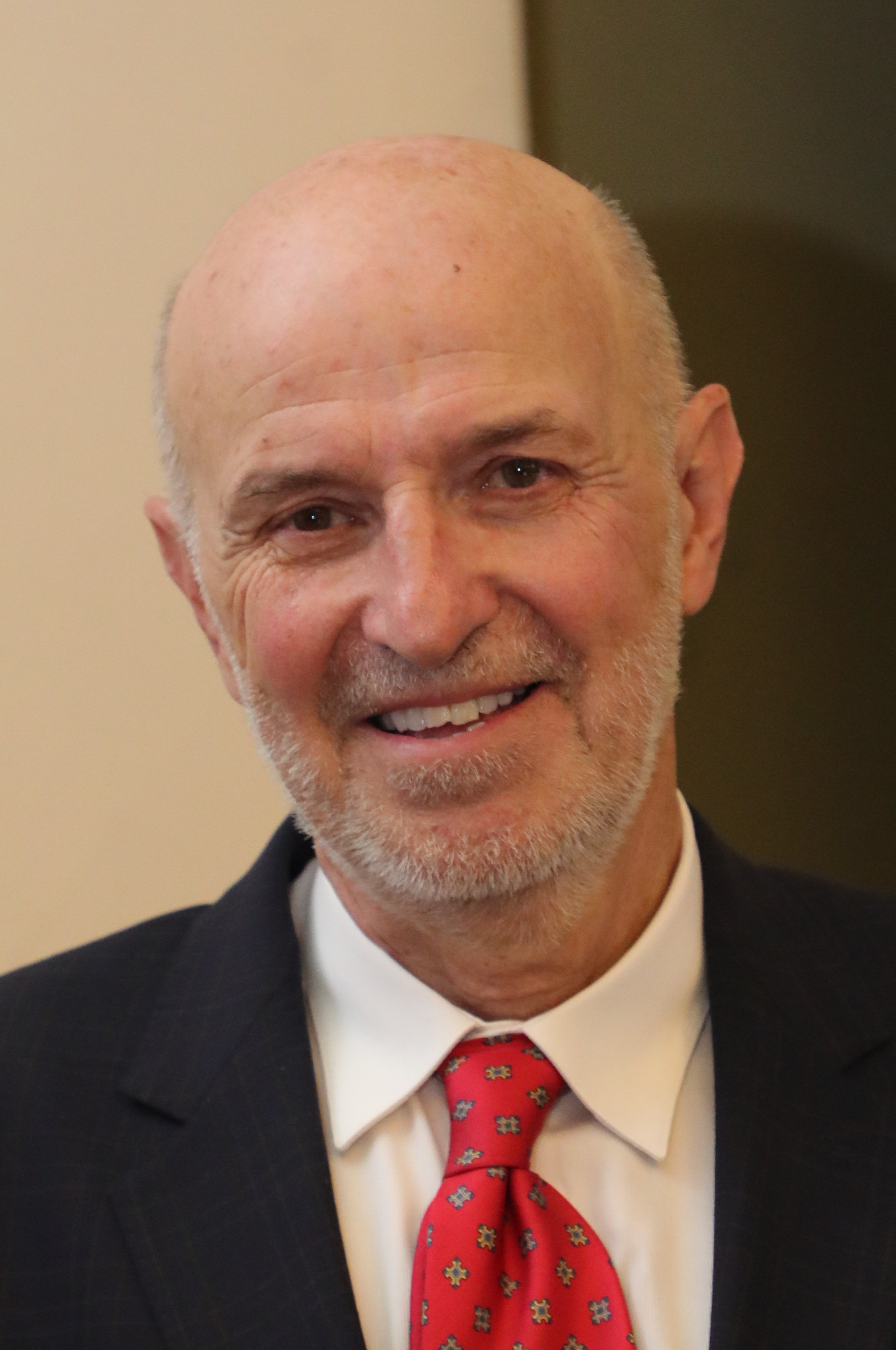
- Simonović in 2022
- Born: 26 April 1949 (age 77); Belgrade, Yugoslavia
- Citizenship: Canadian
- Education: University of Belgrade (BSc, MSc); University of California, Davis (PhD)
- Awards: Camille A. Dagenais Award (2005); Ven Te Chow Award (2013); Fellow of the Royal Society of Canada (2020); Fellow of the Canadian Academy of Engineering (2013); Foreign member of the Serbian Academy of Sciences and Arts (2021)
- Scientific career
- Fields: Civil engineering, water resources management, flood risk management
- Workplaces: University of Manitoba; University of Western Ontario; Institute for Catastrophic Loss Reduction
- Website: slobodansimonovic.com

Slobodan P. Simonović (born 26 April 1949) is a Serbian-Canadian civil engineer and professor emeritus at the University of Western Ontario. His research applies systems analysis to water resources management, focusing on flood risk and adapting water infrastructure to climate change.

== Education and career ==
Simonović was born in Belgrade on 26 April 1949. He received a BSc in civil engineering (1974) and an MSc in water resources systems (1977) from the University of Belgrade, and a PhD in water resources systems engineering from the University of California, Davis in 1981.

He joined the Department of Civil and Geological Engineering at the University of Manitoba as an associate professor in 1986, was promoted to full professor in 1992, and directed the university's Natural Resources Institute from 1996 to 2000. In 2000, he moved to the University of Western Ontario as a professor of civil and environmental engineering. Since retiring from teaching in 2019, he has been professor emeritus at Western and director of engineering studies at the Institute for Catastrophic Loss Reduction.

== Research ==
Simonović's work uses simulation, optimization, and multi-criteria analysis to study the planning and operation of complex water systems, including reservoir operations, flood forecasting, and the resilience of urban infrastructure. He has published more than 550 professional papers and three textbooks.

His research group has released publicly accessible software tools for water resources practice, including the IDF_CC tool for updating local extreme-rainfall statistics under climate change; ResilSIM, a web-based decision-support tool that estimates the resilience of urban infrastructure to flooding; and a tool for evaluating impacts of global change based on the ANEMI integrated model. In 2021, the group released a publicly accessible web tool mapping projected changes in floodplains across Canada under climate change scenarios, described as the first flood-impact map of its kind to cover the entire country. He has frequently commented on urban flooding, climate change, and infrastructure adaptation in Canadian print and broadcast media.

Simonović and his research group publish the Water Resources Research Reports series, distributed through the Western University library.

== Recognition ==
Simonović received the American Society of Civil Engineers Ven Te Chow Award in 2013 for lifetime achievement in hydrologic engineering. In 2005, he received the Camille A. Dagenais Award from the Canadian Society for Civil Engineering in recognition of outstanding contributions to the development and practice of hydrotechnical engineering in Canada. His other awards include the International Award of the Japan Society of Hydrology and Water Resources (2001) and an award for outstanding contribution from the European Water Resources Association (2017). He was inducted into the Canadian Academy of Engineering in 2013 and elected a fellow of the Royal Society of Canada in 2020. In 2021, he was elected a foreign member of the Serbian Academy of Sciences and Arts in the Department of Technical Sciences. The same year, Reuters included him on its "Hot List" of the world's 1,000 most influential climate scientists.

== Selected books ==
- Managing Water Resources: Methods and Tools for a Systems Approach. UNESCO/Earthscan, 2009. ISBN 978-1-84407-553-9 (translated into Farsi)
- Systems Approach to Management of Disasters: Methods and Applications. Wiley, 2011. ISBN 978-0-470-52809-9 (translated into Chinese)
- Floods in a Changing Climate: Risk Management. Cambridge University Press, 2012. ISBN 978-1-107-01874-7 (translated into Chinese)
