= PPS 3 =

Planning Policy Statement 3: Housing was published in November 2006, outlining the strategic housing policy of the government of the United Kingdom, which was "to ensure that everyone has the opportunity of living in a decent home, which they can afford, in a community where they want to live."

The policy was developed in response to the Barker Review.

The statement defines sustainable development as "urban development".

The Royal Town Planning Institute described the statement as threatening to "to reject need and sustainability in favour of demand".

== See also ==
- Planning policy statements
- Town and country planning in the United Kingdom
- Planning and Compulsory Purchase Act 2004
