= Regional spatial strategy =

Regional spatial strategies (RSS) provided regional level planning frameworks for the regions of England outside London with the London Plan being the London equivalent. They were introduced in 2004 and revoked in 2010.

== History ==
RSS emerged from the Planning and Compulsory Purchase Act 2004 under New Labour, which abolished structure plans and replaced regional planning guidance (RPG) with RSS, which then became the strategic level plan charged with informing local development frameworks (LDFs). Local authoritie prepared local development documents, which were to be consistent with the regional spatial strategy, identifying specific locations for development and conservation, and establishing local policies for managing development.

Each RSS was prepared by the relevant regional assembly, and was then submitted to the Secretary of State.

In 2010, the new Conservative-Liberal coalition government revoked the regional spatial strategies.

== See also ==
- Planning policy statements
- Town and country planning in the United Kingdom
- Planning and Compulsory Purchase Act 2004
  - Wales Spatial Plan
