= Images of England =

Defunct website hosting images of listed buildings in England

- Website type: Photography website
- Available in: English
- Owner: Historic England
- Website: www.imagesofengland.org.uk
- Commercial: No
- Registration: Required for contributing photos
- Launched: October 2009; 16 years ago

Images of England is an online photographic record of all the listed buildings in England at the date of February 2002. The archive gives access to over 323,000 colour images, each of which is matched with the item's listed designation and architectural description.

It is a snapshot rather than an up-to-date record: it does not include all listed buildings, only those listed in February 2001, and is not updated as listing details change. As of August 2019 the Images of England content moved to the main Historic England website alongside the list entry.

== Purpose ==
Images of England was a stand-alone project funded jointly by English Heritage and the Heritage Lottery Fund. The aim of the project was to photograph every listed building and object (some 370,000) in England and to make the images available online to create, what was at the time, one of the largest free-to-view picture libraries of buildings in the world. It is part of the Historic England Archive of England's historic environment.

The project started in October 1999, and the final images were uploaded in September 2008. There are 323,107 images online.

The archive has deliberately not been updated, so any changes to the buildings since the photographs were first taken are not recorded. The official up-to-date list of all listed buildings in England is found on the National Heritage List for England.

== Contents ==
The searchable database includes a range of items, not just houses and churches. The term ‘Listed Building’ includes war memorials, letter boxes, bridges, tombs, telephone boxes and milestones and much more. Each entry on the database consists of a single, representative photograph and a text listing, written by historic building experts within English Heritage.

However, some records state ‘no image available’. This may be for a variety of reasons, e.g., because the building no longer exists, it could not be found, or the photograph did not pass the quality assurance process. Pictures of prisons had a different treatment as it is illegal to take or attempt to take a photograph of any building that is, or is associated with, one of HM Prisons. Photographs of Listed Prisons were taken with permission from the Prison Service as part of a major recording project by the Royal Commission on the Historical Monuments of England (merged with English Heritage in 1999).

In some instances, a house owner did not permit the photograph to be taken on their private land, or may have asked to be included in the exemption scheme. In early 2002, the Country Landowners Association (now Country Land and Business Association) raised concerns over the security implications of photographs of residential properties made available on the Images of England website. In response, English Heritage introduced an exemption scheme, whereby owners of listed buildings with a maximum of two households were able to register for an exclusion from the database until 2013. The photographs of the properties were still taken, where visible from public land, and are stored in the NMR archive.

== Project methodology ==
Hundreds of volunteer photographers, many from local camera clubs or the Royal Photographic Society, were allocated several listed buildings to record in their area. They were briefed to only take one ‘defining image’ of each listed item. Each 'defining image' aimed to show the architectural character of the building, indicate its historical function, suggest its context, and provide a truthful high quality image with as much visual information as possible. The photographers were restricted to one frame per building and used standard 35 mm photographic equipment and colour negative film.

Volunteers were given film, processing and travel expenses and retained the copyright to their images. Each photograph is credited to the relevant photographer on the site. The photographs had to be taken from publicly accessible land (unless permission was granted to photograph from private land).

Many of the listed structures were hard to photograph due to their size or location. This meant that, in some circumstances, some pictures are not ideal, but have been included anyway to provide as comprehensive a record as possible. Much of the success of the finished project is due to the enthusiasm and thoroughness of the volunteers who hunted down buildings and tried to find the best angle for the photograph in often not ideal circumstances.

== Closure ==
As of August 2019, the Images of England site closed down and "all the images from the website are available on the National Heritage List for England, alongside the corresponding up-to-date list description."

The photos from Images of England now appear alongside the 'Missing Pieces Project', where more recent photos can be found and added.

== See also ==
- Listed buildings
