= Material consideration =

A material consideration, in the United Kingdom, is a factor relevant to the development and use of land which the decision-maker should consider when assessing and deciding the outcome of a planning application.

Material considerations include issues such as traffic, wildlife, economic impacts, and the character, landscape and/or historical interest of the area. In considering an application for development, decision-makers often consult local development plans and the National Planning Policy Framework (NPPF) to determine the success of a proposal.

Issues such as loss of a view, or an effect on property or business values, are not material considerations.

The Campaign to Protect Rural England advises that Material Considerations are factors that will be taken into account when a decision on a planning application or appeal is reached. Under Section 38 of the Planning and Compulsory Purchase Act 2004, decisions on planning applications 'must be made in accordance with the [development] plan unless other material considerations indicate otherwise'.

The courts ultimately decide what a material consideration is. However, case law gives local planning authorities a great deal of leeway to decide what considerations are relevant and how much weight should be given to them, each time they make a decision on a planning application. Any consideration that relates to the use or development of land is capable of being a material consideration, but other circumstances such as personal hardship and fears of affected residents can be considered in exceptional cases (the House of Lords in Great Portland Estates v. Westminster City Council [1985]).

In practice, government planning policy is often the most important material consideration other than the development plan. Government policy may also override the development plan if it has been both consulted on and published more recently.
