= Planning Service =

Northern Irish executive agency

- Legal status: Active
- Headquarters: Millennium House; 17-25 Great Victoria Street; Belfast; BT2 7BN
- Region served: Northern Ireland
- Leadership: Deputy Secretary - Planning and Local Government Group: Ian Maye; Director of Strategic Planning Division: Anne Garvey; Director of Local Planning Division: Fiona McCandless; Director of Planning Policy Division: Maggie Smith; Acting Director of Local Government Policy Division: Liz Loughran
- Website: planningni.gov.uk

The Planning Service was an agency within the Department of the Environment (Northern Ireland), which regulated the development and the use of land in the public interest and whose functions have been taken over by the Department for Infrastructure.

== Origins ==
The Town and Country Planning Service was established in 1973 when the responsibilities of local planning authorities briefly passed to the Ministry of Development and later to the Department of the Housing, Local Government and Planning before being integrated into the Department of the Environment for Northern Ireland. The Department's statutory planning functions are currently governed by the Planning (Northern Ireland) Order 1991 and associated subordinate legislation.

In April 1996, the Town and Country Planning Service became an Executive Agency of the Department of the Environment for Northern Ireland, known as "The Planning Service".[citation needed]

Following devolution of authority to the Northern Ireland Executive in 1998, the "Department of The Environment for Northern Ireland" was renamed "The Department of The Environment". Some functions previously handled by the "old" Department were transferred to other Northern Ireland Departments. The Planning Service continues to operates an Executive agency within the Department of The Environment.[citation needed]

== Functions ==
- Provide operational planning policy, Development Plans and high quality professional planning decisions.
- Improve delivery of services, having regard to the effective use of available resources, Section 75 of and Schedule 9 to the Northern Ireland Act 1998 and associated human rights and equality policies.
- Improve the quality of services available to customers in line with the principles of Service First - The New Charter Programme and the Agency's Charter Standards Statement.
- Provide an accurate and speedy land and property information service to the conveyancing community
- Ensure that Development Plans, Planning Policies and Development Control promote the orderly and consistent use of land.
- Obtain best value and efficiency in the management of the Agency.
- Develop and maintain effective financial and management information systems
- Maintain high levels of motivation, skills and performance of staff
- Explore opportunities for and introduce, where practicable, Public Private Partnership arrangements
