= Planning policy statements =

Planning policy statements (PPS) were UK government statements of national policy and principles towards certain aspects of the town planning framework. In recent years they only applied to England.

== History ==
The Planning and Compulsory Purchase Act 2004 required that authorities preparing development plans consider the planning policy statements, and may be treated as material considerations in the determination of planning applications. They had gradually been replacing the old style planning policy guidance notes (PPG). They were not legally binding.

In December 2010 the Department for Communities and Local Government announced that all PPSs would be replaced by a single document, the National Planning Policy Framework (NPPF). A consultation draft of this new document was published on 25 July 2011. The final version of this document was published on 27 March 2012. It became a material consideration in planning matters on publication. It replaced all PPSs and all remaining PPGs, plus a number of letters to chief planning officers.

== List of PPSs ==
PPS covered the following matters:

- Planning Policy Statement 1: Delivering Sustainable Development
- Planning Policy Statement 3: Housing
- Planning Policy Statement 4: Planning for Sustainable Economic Growth
- Planning Policy Statement 5: Planning for the Historic Environment
- Planning Policy Statement 6: Planning for Town Centres (Note: Replaced by PPS 4.)
- Planning Policy Statement 7: Sustainable Development in Rural Areas
- Planning Policy Statement 9: Biodiversity and Geological Conservation
- Planning Policy Statement 10: Planning for Sustainable Waste Management
- Planning Policy Statement 11: Regional Spatial Strategies (Note: The coalition government announced in 2010 that Regional Spatial Strategies were to be abolished and, despite a court finding that the Secretary of State had acted unlawfully by telling local planning authorities to take that into account prior to abolition, the Policy Statement was removed from the DCLG website before the law was changed.)
- Planning Policy Statement 12: Local Development Frameworks
- Planning Policy Statement 22: Renewable Energy
- Planning Policy Statement 23: Planning and Pollution Control
- Planning Policy Statement 25: Development and Flood Risk

== See also ==
- Town and country planning in the United Kingdom
- Merton rule (the result of Planning Policy Statement 22)
- Planning and Compulsory Purchase Act 2004
