= Minor amendment (UK Planning) =

Minor Amendments (also known as minor material amendments) are insignificant variation in a detail and details in planning permission in the United Kingdom. These are variations that do not raise any new issues which would warrant the submission of a fresh Planning application. They would allow for small changes to be made often as a result of modifications arising for practical reasons during the course of construction.

These non significant amendments are described as ‘non-material’ under Section 96A of the Town and Country Planning Act 1990.

Many local authorities had established protocols for dealing with such amendments.

The legal basis upon which this is allowed has recently been challenged in Case law, notably:-

- Reprotech (Pebsham) Ltd v East Sussex CC (Lords)
- Henry Boot Homes Ltd v Bassetlaw DC (Court of Appeal)
- Sage v Secretary of State for the Environment, Transport and the Regions (Lords)
- Pioneer Aggregates Ltd v Secretary of State for the Environment [1985] 1AC
