= National Planning Policy Framework =

Land-use planning policy in England

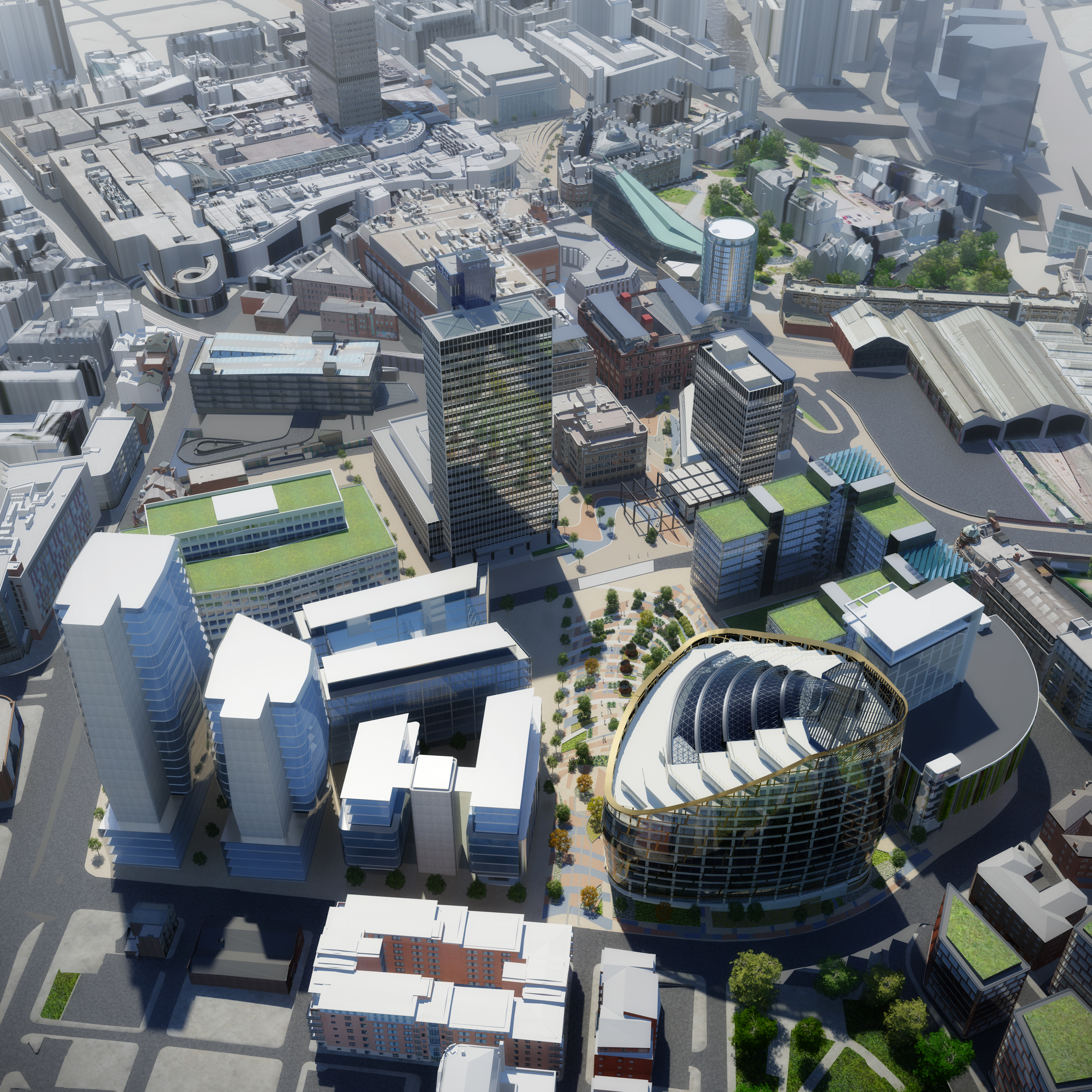
NOMA, a proposed mixed-use development in central Manchester.

The National Planning Policy Framework published in August 2026 (click to read all pages)

The National Planning Policy Framework (NPPF) is a land-use planning policy in England. It was originally published by the UK's Department of Communities and Local Government in March 2012, consolidating over two dozen previously issued documents called Planning Policy Statements (PPS) and Planning Policy Guidance Notes (PPG) for use in England. It has since been revised in 2018, 2019, 2021, twice in 2023 and once in 2024. The live version is from August 2026.

As well as sweeping away the 1997–2010 Labour government's top-down housing targets and regional planning strategies in conjunction with the Localism Act 2011, the NPPF introduced a presumption in favour of sustainable development at the heart of the English planning system, which encourages local planning authorities to plan positively for new development, and approve all individual proposals wherever possible. The other core principles of the framework are of a genuinely plan-led system, empowering local people to shape their surroundings, and seeking high quality design and standards.

== History ==
An outline of proposed reforms to the British planning system was published in a policy green paper by the Conservative Party in February 2010 prior to that year's general election. It included integrating the principal features of all national planning policies into one document to make the many existing guidance documents clearer and more priority focused.

Following the formation of the Coalition government, on 20 December 2010, the Minister for Decentralisation, Greg Clark MP, announced a review of planning policy, designed to consolidate all policy statements, circulars and guidance documents into a single, simpler National Planning Policy Framework.

A consultation draft of the NPPF was subsequently published on 25 July 2011 which raised a large number of responses and concerns from national organisations such as the National Trust.

The final original version was published on 27 March 2012. Despite the pledge for a national policy of only fifty pages, the NPPF was released as a 65-page document, together with a 27-page Technical Guidance document, though this was still a large reduction from the previous guidance of over 1,300 pages. Local planning authorities were given a 12-month transition period to ensure their plans were compliant with the new NPPF.

A revised NPPF was published by the UK Government's Ministry of Housing, Communities and Local Government on 24 July 2018. This is the first revision of the National Planning Policy Framework since 2012. It implements around 85 reforms announced previously through the Housing White Paper, the planning for the right homes in the right places consultation and the draft revised National Planning Policy Framework consultation. The revised NPPF has since been updated on 19 February 2019 following a technical consultation to redefine deliverable housing. On 23 May 2019 the Secretary of State for Housing, Communities and Local Government issued a Written Ministerial Statement to remove paragraph 209a from the revised National Planning Policy Framework following a legal judgement.

== Contents ==
1. Introduction
2. Achieving sustainable development
3. Plan-making
4. Decision-making
5. Delivering a sufficient supply of homes
6. Building a strong, competitive economy
7. Ensuring the vitality of town centres
8. Promoting healthy and safe communities
9. Promoting sustainable transport
10. Supporting high quality communications
11. Making effective use of land
12. Achieving well-designed places
13. Protecting Green Belt land
14. Meeting the challenge of climate change, flooding and coastal change
15. Conserving and enhancing the natural environment
16. Conserving and enhancing the historic environment
17. Facilitating the sustainable use of minerals

=== Heritage protection ===
A heritage statement is a written statement accompanying a planning application or a listed building consent application which outlines the heritage significance of the building or other asset affected by the application, the potential impact of the planning proposal on the asset and the means by which the undesirable impacts on the asset will be mitigated.

Heritage statements became compulsory in March 2010 when Planning Policy Statement (PPS) 5, Planning for the Historic Environment was published. This requirement was repeated within paragraph 128 of the NPPF. PPS5 was cancelled on 25 March 2015 and replaced with Historic Environment good practice advice.

== Criticisms ==
=== Archaeology ===
The potential negative impact of the NPPF on UK archaeology has been heavily debated, with archaeologists noting that there is likely to be considerable tension between the immediate-term impacts of the process of government deregulation in the NPPF and the medium-term impacts of another key government priority – its localism agenda as enshrined in the Localism Act of 2011, which places much greater planning control in the hands of local communities. The NPPF is likely to encourage development through its streamlined planning system, but the Localism Act of 2011 is equally likely to stall development through its commitment to local communities having a greater say in what is (and crucially is not) built in their neighbourhood, a process likely to block many developments.

=== Environment ===
Friends of the Earth (FOE) has criticised the NPPF revisions for lack of environmental review, in that it makes it "virtually impossible" for councils to refuse fracking schemes, that it fails to address the problems in coal developments or on building within green belts, and that it introduces harsh rules for wind farms. In 2018, FOE argued that as the United Kingdom was still part of the European Union, a strategic environmental assessment (SEA) was required as part of the revision of a public plan. Also in 2018, the Campaign to Protect Rural England (CPRE) raised concerns about the extreme streamlining of the revised NPPF, indicating that it treated land as a commodity, rather than as a finite resource. CPRE said Planning is pointless if the outcomes it delivers would be little different from what would happen without a planning system.

=== Planning Practice Guidance ===
Publication of the NPPF has been followed by the release of a wide range of online Planning Practice Guidance. As of 2019, the guidance extended to over fifty categories covering a wide range of subjects including Green Belt, Light Pollution, and Viability. The amount of guidance in circulation has grown significantly in recent years meaning the volume of government planning advice is similar to what existed prior to the introduction of the NPPF. Unlike the more infrequent changes to the NPPF, much of the most recent practice guidance has been issued without prior consultation or advance notification with new policy requirements increasingly being expressed through guidance updates.

=== 2020 planning reforms ===
In 2020, a series of far reaching changes to Permitted Development rights and the Use Classes Order were introduced, effectively superseding a number of key NPPF provisions. The relevant statutory instruments were laid before parliament the day before the summer recess and were to come into force the day before parliament reconvened. On 27 August 2020, campaign group Rights: Community: Action applied for a judicial review of the statutory instruments on the basis that the changes introduced were unlawful citing a lack of scrutiny, consultation or impact assessments as well as a failure of the government to take account of its own independent experts. The judicial review was ultimately unsuccessful.
