= Town and country planning in the United Kingdom =

Urban planning in the United Kingdom

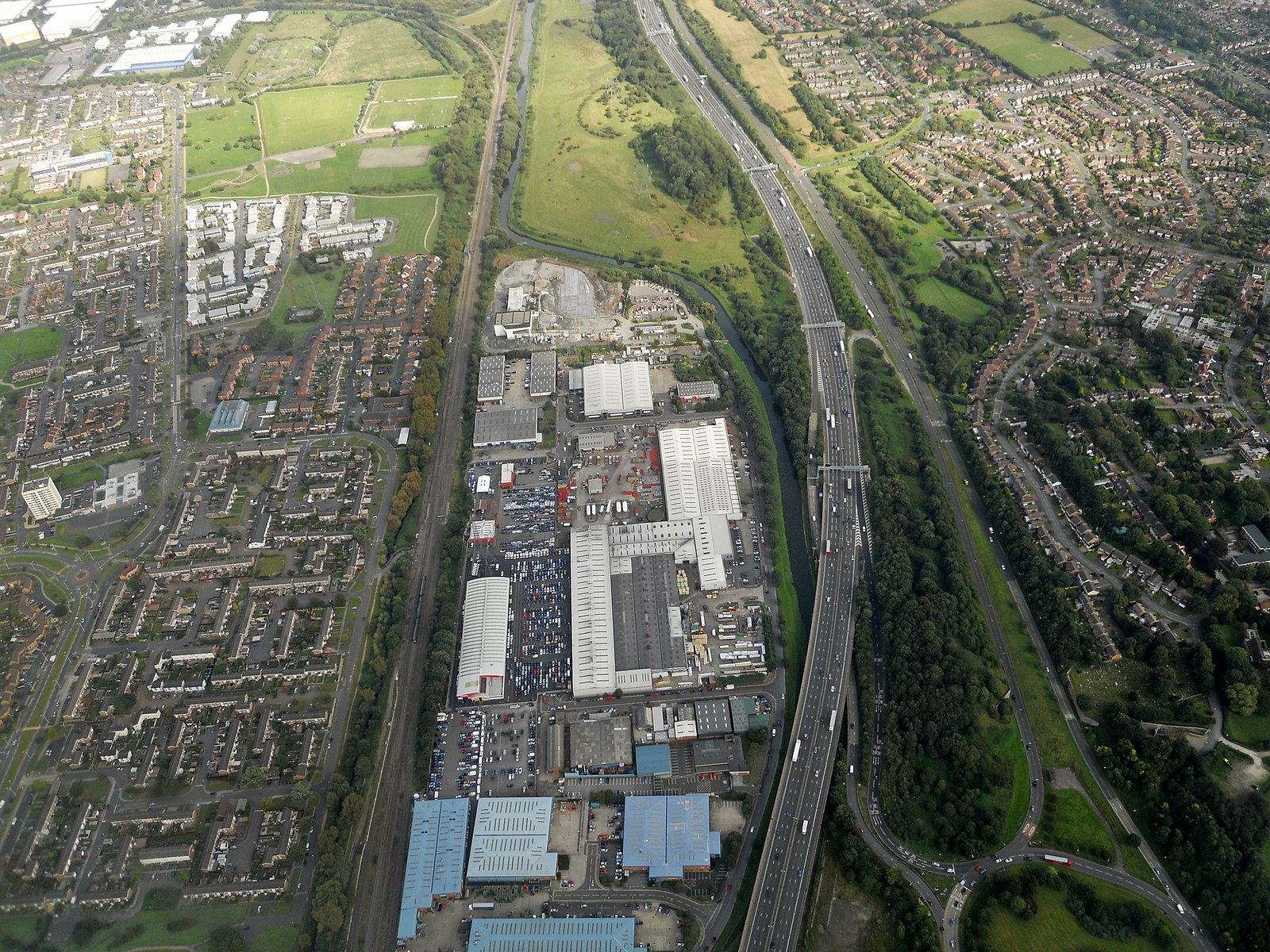
Aerial view of Castle Bromwich showing different land uses

Town and country planning in the United Kingdom is the part of UK land law which concerns land-use planning. Its purported goal is to ensure sustainable economic development and a better environment. Each country of the United Kingdom has its own planning system that is responsible for town and country planning, which outside of England is devolved to the Northern Ireland Assembly, the Scottish Parliament and the Senedd.

In England and Wales, the principal piece of legislation is the Town and Country Planning Act 1990; its counterparts in Northern Ireland and Scotland are the Planning Act (Northern Ireland) 2011 and the Town and Country Planning (Scotland) Act 1997 respectively. The planning system in England is under the overall control of the Ministry of Housing, Communities and Local Government.

== History ==
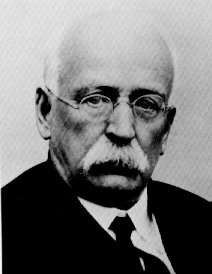
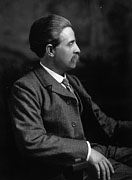
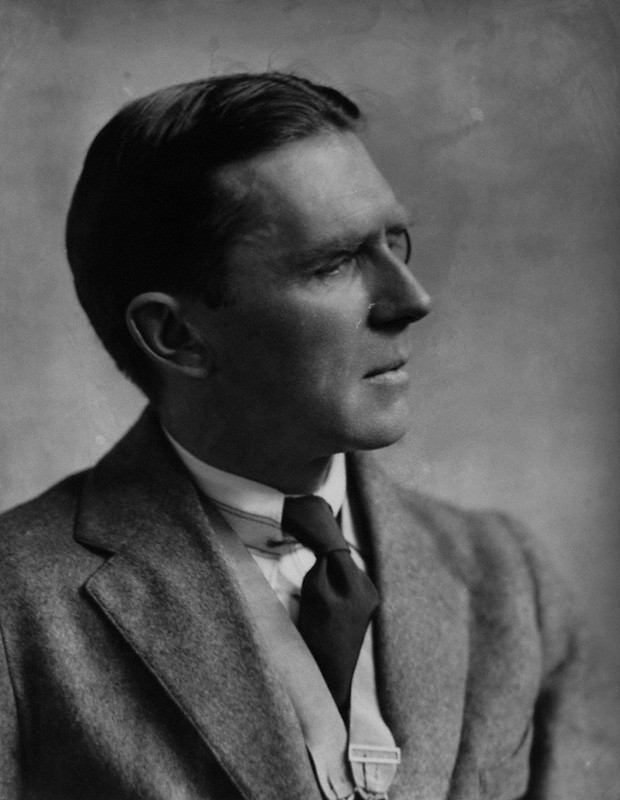
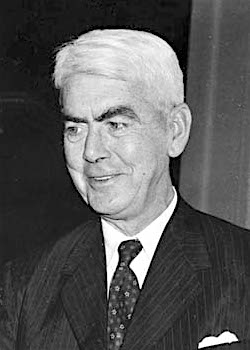
Notable figures from UK planning history. Clockwise from upper left: Ebenezer Howard, Raymond Unwin, William Morrison, Patrick Abercrombie.

The term 'town planning' first appeared in 1906 and was first used in British legislation in 1909.

The roots of the UK town and country planning system as it emerged in the immediate post-war years lay in concerns developed over the previous half century in response to industrialisation and urbanisation. The particular concerns were pollution, urban sprawl, and ribbon development. These concerns were expressed through the work of thinkers such as Ebenezer Howard and the philanthropic actions of industrialists such as the Lever Brothers and the Cadbury family, and architects such as Raymond Unwin, PRIBA, and Patrick Abercrombie.

The Housing, Town Planning, etc. Act 1909, the Housing, Town Planning, &c. Act 1919, the Town Planning Act 1925 and the Town and Country Planning Act 1932 were initial moves toward modern urban planning legislation.

By the outbreak of Second World War, thinking was sufficiently advanced that the Ministry of Town and Country Planning was established on 7 February 1943 under William Morrison, the former Postmaster-General. During the war, a series of royal commissions looked into specific problems in urban planning and development control. These included:

- The Barlow Commission (1940) into the distribution of industrial population
- The Scott Committee into rural land use (1941)
- The Uthwatt Committee into compensation and betterment (1942)
- The Reith Report into New Towns (1947)

Also, Patrick Abercrombie developed the Greater London Plan for the reconstruction of London, which envisaged moving 1.5 million people from London to new and expanded towns. These intellectual efforts resulted in the New Towns Act 1946 (9 & 10 Geo. 6. c. 68) and the Town and Country Planning Act 1947.

=== Modern planning ===
The 1947 act, in effect, nationalised the right to develop land. It required all proposals, with a few exceptions, to secure planning permission from the local planning authority (LPA), with provision to appeal against refusal. It introduced a development charge to capture the planning gain which arises when permission to develop land is granted. This was abolished by the Town and Country Planning Act 1954 passed under subsequent Conservative government. Green belts were added in 1955 via a government circular. Furthermore, the 1947 act introduced a requirement, which still exists, on local authorities to develop forward looking policy documents such as local plans or unitary development plans to outline what kind of development is permitted where, and to mark special areas on Local Plan policies maps. It did not introduce a formal system of zoning as used in the United States. Counties developed structure plans that set broad targets for the wider area. Structure plans were always problematic and were often in the process of being replaced by the time they were formally adopted.

Over the years, the planning system has undergone a number of alterations, which were consolidated in the Town and Country Planning Act 1990 (TCPA 1990). Section 106 substantially re-wrote section 52 from the former act, settling the concept of agreements (known as "planning obligation agreements," or more commonly "Section 106 agreements"), under which the developer is subject to detailed arrangements and restrictions beyond those that a planning condition could impose, or by which they make agreed financial contributions beyond the immediate building works to offset development effects on the local community. This was soon amended to allow a developer to self-impose obligations to preempt objections to planning permission. This prevents the planning authority from blocking a permission by merely failing to negotiate.

Three further acts related to planning are associated with this primary act: The Planning (Listed Buildings and Conservation Areas) Act 1990, the Planning (Hazardous Substances) Act 1990, and the Planning (Consequential Provisions) Act 1990. These four acts are referred to as the Planning Acts. Almost immediately after Parliament passed these acts, the government had further thoughts on the control of land development, which led to the Planning and Compensation Act 1991, which made important alterations to many of the provisions of the Planning Acts.

The Planning and Compulsory Purchase Act 2004 made substantial changes to the English development plan system. It did away with both structure plans and local plans, in favour of local development frameworks (LDFs), which are made up a number of Local Development Documents (LDDs) and supplementary planning documents (SPDs). The regional spatial strategy (RSS), which is produced by regional assemblies in England, replaced the structure plan as the strategic planning document (containing targets for housing and employment development in each district in a region). A variation on this approach exists in Wales.

LPAs are also now required to produce local development schemes (LDS) – which outline the work the LDDs/SPDs they intend to produce over a three-year period, and a statement of community involvement (SCI), which outlines how the Council will involve the local community. All LDDs and SPDs also have to be accompanied by a sustainability appraisal (SA) and a strategic environmental assessment (SEA). The SEA was originally a requirement under European Union laws. Planning Policy Guidance Notes are also being gradually replaced by Planning Policy Statements.

Minor amendments were allowed to planning permissions, recognising that information provided for planning permission does not provide enough detail for actual construction. Working drawings are required first, and architects often make small changes to accommodate a building's technical requirements. Also, plans might change on site to overcome unforeseen problems. Legality of minor amendments was challenged in 2006, and central government advice to many local authorities was that any variation to a planning permission should require planning approval.

The Localism Act 2011 introduced wide-ranging changes to the planning system in England. The bill introduced legal provision under which local communities (led by parish councils or neighbourhood forums) could develop neighbourhood plans. Similar to development plan documents produced by the LPA, neighbourhood plans have statutory weight, so that they are considered in the determination of planning applications.

== Appeals ==
An applicant may appeal against a refusal of planning permission. A neighbour who objects to an application has no right of appeal, but may appeal to the local authority ombudsman if they can make a case of maladministration by the local authority. In such a case the ombudsman has no powers to enforce a retraction of the permission, but it may sanction the local authority. Appeals can be made:

- In England, to the Secretary of State for Communities and Local Government.
- In Northern Ireland, to the Planning Appeals Commission.
- In Scotland, to the Scottish Government; Directorate for Planning & Environmental Appeals or a Local Review Body of the local planning authority.
- In Wales, to the Senedd.

In England and Wales the appeal is heard by a planning inspector, while in Scotland this role is filled by a reporter. There has often been talk of making the inspectors independent of government ministers, as in the Planning Appeals Commission in Northern Ireland.

== Use classes ==
The requirement to obtain planning permission extends not only to new construction, but also some changes of use of a property. To simplify this the Government from time to time publishes a Use Classes Order. Planning permission is not normally required for a change of use within a Class but change of use to a different Use Class generally requires permission. Separate Orders are made in respect of England, Scotland and Wales.

In all cases the appropriate Class is determined by the 'primary purpose' of the use and a use may have other elements that are different but ‘ordinarily incidental’. For example, a restaurant may have some takeaway sales. The use of some properties is also limited by conditions imposed on the original planning permission.

Use Classes in England were extensively revised on 1 September 2020 (the revisions do not apply to Wales). The new Order introduced a new Class E encompassing most business, retail and similar uses replacing the previous Classes A1, A2, A3 and B1, B2 as well as parts of the old Class D (such as health uses and day nurseries). It also introduced a new Class F1 and F2 replacing those uses from the previous Class D1 and D2 that had not been swept up into Class E. Class F2 is unusual in that it separates certain small local shops from Class E. As before, a number of uses are deemed sui generis (in a class of its own) and planning permission is required for any change of use to or from such uses.

As of March 2024, the use classes in England are:

- B2 – General industrial
- B8 – Storage or distribution
- C1 – Hotels
- C2 – Residential institutions
- C2A – Secure residential institutions
- C3 – Dwellinghouses
- C4 – House in multiple occupation
- E – Commercial, business and service
- F1 – Learning and non-residential institutions
- F2 – Local community
- Sui generis – No class specified

As of June 2026, the use classes in Wales are:

- A1 - Shops
- A2 - Financial and professional services
- A3 - Food and drink
- B1 - Business
- B2 - General industrial
- B8 - Storage or distribution
- C1 - Hotels
- C2 - Residential institutions
- C3 - Dwellinghouses
- C4 - Houses in multiple occupation
- D1 - Non-residential institutions
- D2 - Assembly and leisure
- Unique use - does not fall within any use class

== Development management ==
A key part of planning control is exercised in the UK by preventing any significant development of property without permission by the local authority. In Part III of the Town and Country Planning Act 1990, under section 59 the Secretary of State delegates to public bodies the right to grant planning permission.

=== Online access ===
Historically, planning applications were submitted in paper form to designated Council offices and displayed for a statutory period at public libraries or offices. In December 1995, the London Borough of Wandsworth created a website that published electronic images of planning application documents. This technology greatly improved access to application-related documents for all participants in the planning process. Within ten years, most planning authorities within the UK followed suit. These sites are often known as 'Public Access'. Other access methods now include routing inquiries through a centrally-hosted public or privately hosted website, such as UKPlanning or the national Planning Portal.

== Principal legislation ==
- Town and Country Planning Act 1990 (as amended) for England and Wales
- Town and Country Planning (Scotland) Act 1997 (as amended) for Scotland
- Planning Act (Northern Ireland) 2011 (as amended) for Northern Ireland

== Criticism ==
The aim of recent reforms to the planning system was to simplify and speed up the production of plans. The financial costs and time delays associated with the new system are significant and the Barker Review of Housing Supply (2004) on the planning system suggested some of the requirements were unnecessary and delaying the delivery of sustainable and social housing, and recommended early revisions to the regulations. HM Treasury noted the recommendation to redirect a portion of Section 106 financial contributions as a "planning gain supplement"" for wider community needs and has responded by an act of Parliament that will levy "a tax on the increase in the value of land resulting from the grant of permission for development".

- Planning Green Paper
- Planning white paper (Scotland): Modernising the planning system

The impact of the Localism Act on planning has been criticized, for creating a system which has highly ambiguous policy, failing to deliver on housing need, and effectively incapacitating local or regional authorities from making long term, strategic plans.

== See also ==
- Town and country planning in England
- Town and country planning in Northern Ireland
- Town and country planning in Scotland
- Town and country planning in Wales
