= Planning and Compulsory Purchase Act 2004 =

Act of the Parliament of the United Kingdom

Planning and Compulsory Purchase Act 2004 (Note: Section 125.)
- Act of Parliament
- Parliament of the United Kingdom
- Long title: An Act to make provision relating to spatial development and town and country planning; and the compulsory acquisition of land.
- Citation: 2004 c. 5
- Territorial extent: England and Wales, except that sections 111(1) and 118(2) and 120 to 122 and 124 and 125 also extend, and sections 90 to 98 and 117(8) and 119(2) only extend, to Scotland, and the extent of any amendment, repeal or revocation made by this Act is the same as that of the enactment amended, repealed or revoked. (Note: Section 124.)

Dates
- Royal assent: 13 May 2004
- Commencement: Various (Note: Section 121.)
Other legislation
Amends	Land Compensation Act 1961; Finance Act 1969; Town and Country Planning Act 1990; Planning (Listed Buildings and Conservation Areas) Act 1990; Planning (Hazardous Substances) Act 1990; Planning (Consequential Provisions) Act 1990; Town and Country Planning (Scotland) Act 1997; Planning (Hazardous Substances) (Scotland) Act 1997; Planning (Listed Buildings and Conservation Areas) (Scotland) Act 1997; Countryside and Rights of Way Act 2000
Amended by	Government of Wales Act 2006; Criminal Justice and Courts Act 2015; Planning and Infrastructure Act 2025

Status: Amended

Text of statute as originally enacted

Revised text of statute as amended

The Planning and Compulsory Purchase Act 2004 (c. 5) is an act of the Parliament of the United Kingdom. It was promoted by the Office of the Deputy Prime Minister. It substantially reforms the town planning and compulsory purchase framework in the United Kingdom.

It both amended and repealed significant parts of the existing planning and compulsory purchase legislation in force at the time, including the Town and Country Planning Act 1990, and introduced reforms such as the abolition of local plans and structure plans, and their replacement with Local Development Frameworks.

== History ==
The act took over 18 months to negotiate its passage through Parliament and required special dispensation both to be carried over from one parliamentary session to another and to prevent it being lost on one occasion due to an error in the wording of a Commons motion.

The bill was introduced in the House of Commons in December 2002. It was re-committed to Commons committee to allow the inclusion of significant new material relating to the removal of Crown immunity and compulsory purchase and carried over to the following session.

The act received royal assent on 13 May 2004 and came into force in mid July 2004; regulations implementing the parts of the act reforming development plans came into force shortly afterwards.

The remaining sections of the act are being implemented by further regulations and development orders.

== Provisions ==
=== Crown immunity ===
The act removed Crown immunity from the planning system.

=== Compulsory purchase ===
The act made certain reforms to compulsory purchase.

=== Wales ===
The act made changes to the planning system in Wales:

- The publication of the Wales spatial plan became a statutory duty of the National Assembly.
- The procedure for local development plans was streamlined.

=== Structure ===
- Part 1 - Regional Functions
- Part 2 - Local Development
- Part 3 - Development
- Part 4 - Development Control
- Part 5 - Correction of Errors
- Part 6 - Wales
- Part 7 - Crown Application of Planning Acts
  - Chapter 1 - England and Wales
  - Chapter 2 - Scotland
- Part 8 - Compulsory Purchase
- Part 9 - Miscellaneous and General

== Sources ==
- The planning Portal
