= Crown Estate Scotland =

Public corporation of the Scottish Government

Crown Estate Scotland Oighreachd a' Chrùin Alba

Public corporation overview
- Formed: 1 April 2017
- Preceding Public corporation: Crown Estate
- Jurisdiction: Scotland
- Headquarters: Edinburgh, Scotland
- Minister responsible: Gillian Martin, Cabinet Secretary for Climate Action and Rural Affairs
- Public corporation executive: Ronan O'Hara, Chief Executive
- Website: www.crownestatescotland.com

Crown Estate Scotland (Scottish Gaelic: Oighreachd a' Chrùin Alba) is the self-financing public corporation of the Scottish Government responsible for the management of land and property in Scotland owned by the monarch 'in right of the Crown'. It was separated from the Crown Estate of the United Kingdom under the Scotland Act 2016.

It is responsible for a range of rural, coastal, urban and marine assets across Scotland. The monarch remains the legal owner of these assets, but they do not form the private property of the monarch, and cannot be sold by the monarch. The primary purpose of Crown Estate Scotland is to invest in property, natural resources, and places to create lasting value for the people of Scotland. Surplus revenue (i.e. revenue profit after maintaining and enhancing the value of the estate, as per the Scottish Crown Estate Act 2019) does not belong to the monarch, but is paid to the Scottish Consolidated Fund which in turn helps finance the Scottish Government.

Crown Estate Scotland's main income source is from leases on the property, which is mostly in sectors such as offshore renewables, farming, tourism and aquaculture. The corporation is one of the largest property managers in Scotland, managing assets worth £568.2 million as of 2022. These include over 35,565 hectares (87,880 acres) of land in rural Scotland, the majority of which is let for farming, residential, commercial, sporting and mineral operations.

The estate also has significant holdings in the coastal and marine environment, including virtually all of the seabed out to 12 nautical miles (22 kilometres), rights to lease seabed for renewable energy generation and gas and carbon dioxide storage out to 200 nautical miles (370 kilometres) and just under half of Scotland's foreshore. The corporation works alongside the Scottish Government, Scottish Parliament, local authorities, communities, third sector and businesses with the aim to create "lasting value for Scotland".

== History ==
Crown Lands (Scotland) Act 1832 (Note: The citation of this act by this short title was authorised by section 1 of, and the first schedule to, the Short Titles Act 1896. Due to the repeal of those provisions it is now authorised by section 19(2) of the Interpretation Act 1978.)
- Act of Parliament
- Parliament of the United Kingdom
- Long title: An Act to authorize the Hereditary Land Revenues of the Crown in Scotland being placed under the Management of the Commissioners of the Land Revenues.
- Citation: 2 & 3 Will. 4. c. 112
- Territorial extent: United Kingdom

Dates
- Royal assent: 15 August 1832
- Commencement: 15 August 1832 (Note: The Acts of Parliament (Commencement) Act 1793.)
- Repealed: 27 July 1961
Other legislation
Repealed by	Crown Estate Act 1961
Relates to	Crown Lands Act 1832; Crown Lands (Scotland) Act 1833; Crown Lands (Scotland) Act 1835

Status: Repealed

Text of statute as originally enacted

Crown Lands (Scotland) Act 1833
- Act of Parliament
- Parliament of the United Kingdom
- Long title: An Act to provide for the Payment of certain ancient Grants and Allowances formerly paid out of the Civil List Revenues.
- Citation: 3 & 4 Will. 4. c. 86
- Territorial extent: United Kingdom

Dates
- Royal assent: 28 August 1833
- Commencement: 28 August 1833
- Repealed: 23 May 1950
Other legislation
Repealed by	Statute Law Revision Act 1950
Relates to	Civil List Act 1831; Crown Lands (Scotland) Act 1832; Lord Lieutenants' and Lord Chancellors' Salaries (Ireland) Act 1832

Status: Repealed

Text of statute as originally enacted

Crown Lands (Scotland) Act 1835
- Act of Parliament
- Parliament of the United Kingdom
- Long title: An Act to amend the Acts relating to the Hereditary Land Revenues of the Crown in Scotland.
- Citation: 5 & 6 Will. 4. c. 58
- Territorial extent: United Kingdom

Dates
- Royal assent: 9 September 1835
- Commencement: 9 September 1835
- Repealed: 27 July 1961
Other legislation
Repealed by	Statute Law Revision Act 1874; Crown Lands Act 1894; Crown Estate Act 1961
Relates to	Crown Lands Act 1825; Crown Lands Act 1829; Crown Lands Act 1832; Crown Lands (Scotland) Act 1832; Crown Lands Act 1833

Status: Repealed

Text of statute as originally enacted

The basis for the assets now comprising the Scottish Crown Estate comes from various ancient rights, functions and assets that came to be owned by the Scottish Crown, and later the British Sovereign in Scotland. In 1790 King George III revoked his claim to the income from the crown estates in England, receiving in return an annual payment known as the civil list from the Treasury. The Crown retained the income from estates in Scotland until 1830, when under King William IV the hereditary land revenues of the Crown in Scotland were transferred from the Barons of the Exchequer to the Commissioners of Woods, Forests, Land Revenues, Works and Buildings and their successors under the Crown Lands (Scotland) Act 1832 (2 & 3 Will. 4. c. 112), the Crown Lands (Scotland) Act 1833 (3 & 4 Will. 4. c. 86), and the Crown Lands (Scotland) Act 1835 (5 & 6 Will. 4. c. 58). These holdings mainly comprised former ecclesiastical land (following the abolition of the episcopacy in 1689) in Caithness and Orkney, and ancient royal possession in Stirling and Edinburgh, and feudal dues. There was virtually no urban property. Most of the present Scottish estate excepting foreshore and salmon fishing is due to inward investment, including Glenlivet Estate, the largest area of land managed by the Crown Estate in Scotland, purchased in 1937, Applegirth, Fochabers and Whitehill estates, purchased in 1963, 1937 and 1969 respectively.

After winning the 2011 Scottish election, the Scottish National Party (SNP) called for the devolution of the Crown Estate income to Scotland. In response to this demand, the Scotland Office decided against dividing up the Crown Estates, but plans were developed to allocate some of the Crown Estate income to the Big Lottery Fund, which would then distribute funds to coastal communities. Following the 2014 Scottish independence referendum, there were calls for more powers to be devolved from the United Kingdom Parliament to the Scottish Parliament. The Smith Commission was announced by Prime Minister David Cameron, with Lord Smith of Kelvin asked to "convene cross-party talks and facilitate an inclusive engagement process across Scotland to produce, by 30 November 2014, Heads of Agreement with recommendations for further devolution of powers to the Scottish Parliament". On 27 November 2014, the commission published a number of recommendations, which included that "responsibility for the management of the Crown Estate's economic assets in Scotland, including the Crown Estate's seabed and mineral and fishing rights, and the revenue generated from these assets, [should] be transferred to the Scottish Parliament."

Crown Estate Scotland (Interim Management) Order 2017 (Note: Section 1(1).)
- Statutory Instrument
- Scottish Parliament
- Citation: SSI 2017/36
- Territorial extent: Scotland

Dates
- Made: 15 February 2017
- Commencement: 16 February 2017
Other legislation
Made under	Scotland Act 2016
Amended by	Scottish Crown Estate Act 2019

Status: Amended

Text of statute as originally enacted

Revised text of statute as amended

Text of the Crown Estate Scotland Order 2017 as in force today (including any amendments) within the United Kingdom, from legislation.gov.uk.

Crown Estate Transfer Scheme 2017 (Note: Section 1(1).)
- Statutory Instrument
- Parliament of the United Kingdom
- Citation: SI 2017/524
- Territorial extent: England and Wales; Scotland; Northern Ireland; (Note: Section 1(3).)

Dates
- Made: 31 March 2017
- Commencement: 1 April 2017 (Note: Section 1(2).)
Other legislation
Amends	Military Lands Act 1892; Light Railways Act 1896; Sea Fisheries (Shellfish) Act 1967; Deer (Scotland) Act 1996; Town and Country Planning (Scotland) Act 1997; Planning (Hazardous Substances) (Scotland) Act 1997; Planning (Listed Buildings and Conservation Areas) (Scotland) Act 1997
Made under	Scotland Act 1998

Status: Current legislation

Text of statute as originally enacted

Text of the Crown Estate Transfer Scheme 2017 as in force today (including any amendments) within the United Kingdom, from legislation.gov.uk.

A bill based on the Smith Commission's recommendations became law as the Scotland Act 2016 in March 2016. This made provision for the devolution for the management and revenues of Crown Estate assets in Scotland. Crown Estate Scotland was established by the Crown Estate Scotland (Interim Management) Order 2017 (SSI 2017/36). Under the Crown Estate Transfer Scheme 2017 (SI 2017/524), the existing functions of the Crown Estate Commissioners and the rights and liabilities set out in the transfer scheme transferred from the Crown Estate Commissioners to Crown Estate Scotland on 1 April 2017. Prior to the handover, the Crown Estate owned a multi-million stake in the Fort Kinnaird retail park which represented about 60% of the value of all Crown assets in Scotland. This was not passed to Crown Estates Scotland with other Scottish properties in 2016. Two years later, the Crown Estate sold its stake and used the funds to assume full ownership of the Gallagher Retail Park in Cheltenham.

The legislation that formally underpins Crown Estate Scotland was passed in 2019: the Scottish Crown Estate Act 2019 (asp 1).

In January 2022 Crown Estate Scotland announced the outcome of the "ScotWind" auction process, where 74 entities applied for rights to offshore wind generation in 17 areas of the seabed (covering a total area of 7,000 km^{2}). The auction raised almost £700m for the Scottish Government, and covers sites estimated to be capable of generating over 24 GW of electricity in total. In April, all 17 winners had signed options. Crown Estate Scotland expects that the supply chain industry spends £1.5bn per project.

== Assets ==
Crown Estate Scotland is responsible for managing:

- 35,565 hectares of rural land with agricultural tenancies, residential and commercial properties and forestry on four rural estates (Glenlivet, Fochabers, Applegirth and Whitehill)
- Salmon and sea trout fishing rights on many Scottish rivers
- Around half the foreshore around Scotland including 5,800 moorings and some ports and harbours
- Leasing of virtually all seabed out to 12 nmi (22 km) covering some 750 fish farming sites and agreements with cables & pipeline operators
- The rights to offshore renewable energy and gas and carbon storage out to 200 nmi (370 km)
- Mineral rights over naturally occurring gold and silver across most of Scotland
- Retail and office units at 39-41 George Street Edinburgh plus various other commercial assets.

Although The Crown has first claim on all "royal fish" (whales which measure more than 25 feet (7.6 m) from the snout to the middle of the tail) found dead or stranded in Scottish waters, since 1999 this right has been administered by the Scottish Government's Marine Directorate, and royal fish do not become the property of Crown Estate Scotland. Similarly, assets that have no owner (bona vacantia) also revert to The Crown, but in Scotland such assets are dealt with by the King's and Lord Treasurer's Remembrancer.

== Management and governance ==
Crown Estate Scotland is a self-financing public corporation of the Scottish Government, i.e. a commercial enterprise under government control. As such Scottish Ministers are ultimately accountable for Crown Estate Scotland and the Scottish Crown Estate. It is overseen by a non-executive board whose members and chair are appointed by Scottish Ministers. Board members are appointed to serve for a two or three-year term, and may not serve for longer than eight years in total. The board appoints a Chief Executive, who is responsible for day-to-day running of the organisation and is accountable to both the Scottish Parliament and the Board. As of September 2022 the Chief Executive was Ronan O'Hara.

== See also ==
- Crown Estate
