= Confiscation of Alcohol (Young Persons) Act 1997 =

Act of the Parliament of the United Kingdom

Confiscation of Alcohol (Young Persons) Act 1997 (Note: Section 2(1).)
- Act of Parliament
- Parliament of the United Kingdom
- Long title: An Act to permit the confiscation of intoxicating liquor held by or for use by young persons in public and certain other places; and for connected purposes.
- Citation: 1997 c. 3
- Introduced by: Robert Spink (Commons); Earl of Kinnoull (Lords)
- Territorial extent: England and Wales; Northern Ireland; (Note: Section 2(3).)

Dates
- Royal assent: 21 March 1997
- Commencement: 21 March 1997 (except section 1); 1 August 1997(section 1); (Note: Section 2(2). The Confiscation of Alcohol (Young Persons) Act 1997 (Commencement) Order 1997.)
Other legislation
Amended by	Criminal Justice and Police Act 2001; Licensing Act 2003; Serious Organised Crime and Police Act 2005; Policing and Crime Act 2009
Relates to	Licensing Act 1964; Licensing (Northern Ireland) Order 1996

Status: Amended

Text of statute as originally enacted

Revised text of statute as amended

The Confiscation of Alcohol (Young Persons) Act 1997 (c. 3) is an act of the Parliament of the United Kingdom.

== Background ==
Previously only the purchase of alcohol was illegal by minors, and officers could take no action against a minor in possession of alcohol unless they were committing another offence.

== Provisions ==
The act empowered police officers to confiscate alcohol from the possession of any minors under the age of 18. The act was introduced to close this loophole and allow officers to seize alcohol in a minor's possession and create an offence for any person who fails to comply with a request to confiscate. Refusal to comply with a request to confiscate can attract a fine of up to £500. The act can also be applied to a person over 18 if the officer believes that the person intends to supply a minor with alcohol in their possession.

The act only applies in England, Wales and Northern Ireland.
