= Local Government (Gaelic Names) (Scotland) Act 1997 =

Act of the Parliament of the United Kingdom

Local Government (Gaelic Names) (Scotland) Act 1997 (Note: Section 2(1).)
- Act of Parliament
- Parliament of the United Kingdom
- Long title: An Act to enable local authorities in Scotland to take Gaelic names; and for connected purposes.
- Citation: 1997 c. 6
- Introduced by: Tommy Graham (private member's bill) (Commons)
- Territorial extent: Scotland (Note: Section 2(3).)

Dates
- Royal assent: 27 February 1997
- Commencement: 27 April 1997 (Note: Section 2(2).)
Other legislation
Amends	Local Government (Scotland) Act 1973

Status: Current legislation

Text of statute as originally enacted

Revised text of statute as amended

The Local Government (Gaelic Names) (Scotland) Act 1997 (c. 6) is an act of the Parliament of the United Kingdom which enables local councils in Scotland to rename the areas for which they are responsible with Gaelic names. It enables them also to revert to names in English. The act was passed by the Parliament of the United Kingdom.

The act added subsections 1A and 1B under section 23 (change of name of local government area) of the Local Government (Scotland) Act 1973. The Local Government etc. (Scotland) Act 1994 states that the name of a council (in Gaelic) shall be "Comhairle" with the addition of the name of their area.

The only council to date (2024) that has taken up the new right is Comhairle nan Eilean Siar (formerly Western Isles Council).
