= Scottish Crown Estate Act 2019 =

Act of the Scottish Parliament

Scottish Crown Estate Act 2019 (Note: Section 47.)
- Act of the Scottish Parliament
- Scottish Parliament
- Long title: An Act of the Scottish Parliament to rename Crown Estate Scotland (Interim Management); to make provision about the management of the Scottish Crown Estate; and for connected purposes.
- Citation: 2019 asp 1
- Territorial extent: Scotland

Dates
- Royal assent: 15 January 2019
- Commencement: various (Note: Section 46.)

Other legislation
- Amends: Crown Suits (Scotland) Act 1857; Ethical Standards in Public Life etc. (Scotland) Act 2000; Scottish Public Services Ombudsman Act 2002; Freedom of Information (Scotland) Act 2002; Public Appointments and Public Bodies etc. (Scotland) Act 2003; Public Services Reform (Scotland) Act 2010; Public Records (Scotland) Act 2011; Scottish Parliament (Disqualification) Order 2015; Scotland Act 2016; Crown Estate Scotland (Interim Management) Order 2017; Gender Representation on Public Boards (Scotland) Act 2018; Islands (Scotland) Act 2018

Status: Amended

Text of statute as originally enacted

Revised text of statute as amended

Text of the Scottish Crown Estate Act 2019 as in force today (including any amendments) within the United Kingdom, from legislation.gov.uk.

The Scottish Crown Estate Act 2019 (asp 1) is an act of the Scottish Parliament regarding Crown Estate Scotland. The act reformed management of the estate, enabling the transfer of management to other bodies within a national framework.

== Passing through Parliament ==
The bill was the Scottish Parliament's first on the Scottish Crown Estate. The bill was introduced on 24 January 2018, passed stage 1 on 19 June, The parliament's environment committee held a consultation on the legislation. In May 2018 the committee produced a report which included a recommendation that to treat the sea bed as a national asset and to manage it through a national approach. The bill passed stage 2 on 18 September and stage 3 on 21 November and passed by a vote of 119 to 0. Mark Ruskell successfully amended the bill to ban the removal of entire kelp plants.

After being passed by the Scottish Parliament, the bill received royal assent on 15 January 2019. This act of the Scottish Parliament renamed Crown Estate Scotland, making provisions for the management of the estate.

== Provisions ==
The responsible body of the estate is Crown Estate Scotland as determined by the act.

The passing of the act in 2019 includes options for two other routes for the management of the Crown Estate assets including transfer or delegation.

The act states who can manage Crown Estate assets and their responsibilities including for planning, reporting and accounting. The act also states how management may be devolved within Scotland.
