= Planning (Hazardous Substances) (Scotland) Act 1997 =

Act of the Parliament of the United Kingdom

Planning (Hazardous Substances) (Scotland) Act 1997 (Note: Section 40(1).)
- Act of Parliament
- Parliament of the United Kingdom
- Long title: An Act to consolidate certain enactments relating to special controls in respect of hazardous substances with amendments to give effect to recommendations of the Scottish Law Commission.
- Citation: 1997 c. 10
- Territorial extent: Scotland (Note: Section 40(3).)

Dates
- Royal assent: 27 February 1997
- Commencement: 27 May 1997 (Note: Section 40(2).)
Other legislation
Amended by	Planning (Consequential Provisions) (Scotland) Act 1997; Planning (Control of Major-Accident Hazards) (Scotland) Regulations 2000; Planning and Compulsory Purchase Act 2004; Planning and Compulsory Purchase Act 2004 (Transitional Provisions) (Scotland) Order 2006; Transport and Works (Scotland) Act 2007 (Consents under Enactments) Regulations 2007; Planning Act 2008; Legislative Reform (Health and Safety Executive) Order 2008; Companies Act 2006 (Consequential Amendments, Transitional Provisions and Savings) Order 2009; Postal Services Act 2011; Energy Act 2013 (Office for Nuclear Regulation) (Consequential Amendments, Transitional Provisions and Savings) Order 2014; Crown Estate Transfer Scheme 2017
Relates to	Town and Country Planning (Scotland) Act 1997; Planning (Listed Buildings and Conservation Areas) (Scotland) Act 1997; Planning (Consequential Provisions) (Scotland) Act 1997

Status: Amended

Text of statute as originally enacted

Revised text of statute as amended

The Planning (Hazardous Substances) (Scotland) Act 1997 (c. 10) is an act of the Parliament of the United Kingdom that consolidated enactments related to special controls in respect of hazardous substances in Scotland, with amendments to give effect to recommendations of the Scottish Law Commission.

The enactments consolidated by the act were repealed by section 3 of, and schedule 1 to, the Planning (Consequential Provisions) (Scotland) Act 1997.

== Provisions ==
The act establishes a regime of hazardous substances consent for Scotland, under which the presence of a hazardous substance on, over or under land at or above a controlled quantity requires the consent of the planning authority. Sections 4 to 10 make provision for obtaining hazardous substances consent, sections 11 to 17 concern variation and revocation of consents, sections 18 to 20 deal with the Secretary of State's powers (including appeals), and sections 21 to 25 address contraventions of hazardous substances control. The Schedule to the act makes provision for the determination of certain appeals by a person appointed by the Secretary of State.

The act consolidated provisions derived principally from the Town and Country Planning (Scotland) Act 1972, as amended by the Housing and Planning Act 1986 and the Planning and Compensation Act 1991. The enactments consolidated were repealed by section 3 of, and schedule 1 to, the Planning (Consequential Provisions) (Scotland) Act 1997 (c. 11), which received royal assent on the same day.
