= Planning (Listed Buildings and Conservation Areas) (Scotland) Act 1997 =

Act of the Parliament of the United Kingdom

Planning (Listed Buildings and Conservation Areas) (Scotland) Act 1997 (Note: Section 83(1).)
- Act of Parliament
- Parliament of the United Kingdom
- Long title: An Act to consolidate certain enactments relating to special controls in respect of buildings and areas of special architectural or historic interest with amendments to give effect to recommendations of the Scottish Law Commission.
- Citation: 1997 c. 9
- Territorial extent: Scotland (Note: Section 83(3).)

Dates
- Royal assent: 27 February 1997
- Commencement: 27 May 1997 (Note: Section 83(2).)
Other legislation
Amended by	Town and Country Planning (Scotland) Act 1997; Planning (Consequential Provisions) (Scotland) Act 1997; Scotland Act 1998 (Transitory and Transitional Provisions) (Complaints of Maladministration) Order 1999; Scotland Act 1998 (Consequential Modifications) (No.2) Order 1999; Abolition of Feudal Tenure etc. (Scotland) Act 2000; Public Appointments and Public Bodies etc. (Scotland) Act 2003; Communications Act 2003 (Consequential Amendments) Order 2003; Town and Country Planning (Electronic Communications) (Scotland) Order 2004; Planning and Compulsory Purchase Act 2004; Planning and Compulsory Purchase Act 2004 (Commencement No. 2 and Consequential Provisions) (Scotland) Order 2006; Planning etc. (Scotland) Act 2006; Planning etc. (Scotland) Act 2006 (Consequential Amendments) Order 2009; Historic Environment (Amendment) (Scotland) Act 2011; Postal Services Act 2011; Historic Environment Scotland Act 2014; Crown Estate Transfer Scheme 2017; Planning (Scotland) Act 2019; Town and Country Planning (Emergency Period and Extended Period) (Coronavirus) (Scotland) Regulations 2020; Coronavirus (Scotland) (No.2) Act 2020; Town and Country Planning (Emergency Period and Extended Period) (Coronavirus) (Scotland) Regulations 2021; Town and Country Planning (Miscellaneous Temporary Modifications) (Coronavirus) (Scotland) Regulations 2021; Town and Country Planning (Miscellaneous Temporary Modifications) (Coronavirus) (Scotland) Regulations 2022
Relates to	Town and Country Planning (Scotland) Act 1997 · Planning (Hazardous Substances) (Scotland) Act 1997 · Planning (Consequential Provisions) (Scotland) Act 1997

Status: Amended

Text of statute as originally enacted

Revised text of statute as amended

The Planning (Listed Buildings and Conservation Areas) (Scotland) Act 1997 (c. 9) is an act of the Parliament of the United Kingdom that consolidated certain enactments relating to special controls in respect of buildings and areas of special architectural or historic interest in Scotland.

The enactments consolidated by the act were repealed by section 3 of, and schedule 1 to, the Planning (Consequential Provisions) (Scotland) Act 1997.

== Provisions ==
The act is divided into four parts and three schedules. Part I (sections 1 to 60) makes provision for listed buildings, covering the listing of buildings of special architectural or historic interest (Chapter I), the authorisation of works affecting listed buildings including the requirement for listed building consent (Chapter II), the rights of owners (Chapter III), enforcement (Chapter IV), and the prevention of deterioration and damage (Chapter V). Part II (sections 61 to 72) makes provision for the designation and management of conservation areas, including controls on the demolition of buildings within them. Part III (sections 73 to 80) contains general provisions applicable to Crown land and local planning authorities, and Part IV (sections 81 to 83) contains supplemental provisions including interpretation, regulation-making powers, and the short title.

The act was one of four related acts of consolidation passed on the same day. The enactments consolidated by the act, together with those consolidated by the Town and Country Planning (Scotland) Act 1997 (c. 8) and the Planning (Hazardous Substances) (Scotland) Act 1997 (c. 10), were repealed by the Planning (Consequential Provisions) (Scotland) Act 1997 (c. 11), which was enacted alongside them and which also made consequential amendments and transitional provisions in connection with the consolidation.
