= Planning (Consequential Provisions) (Scotland) Act 1997 =

Act of the Parliament of the United Kingdom

Planning (Consequential Provisions) (Scotland) Act 1997 (Note: Section 6(1).)
- Act of Parliament
- Parliament of the United Kingdom
- Long title: An Act to make provision for repeals, consequential amendments, transitional matters and savings in connection with the consolidation of enactments in the Town and Country Planning (Scotland) Act 1997, the Planning (Listed Buildings and Conservation Areas) (Scotland) Act 1997 and the Planning (Hazardous Substances) (Scotland) Act 1997 (including provisions to give effect to recommendations of the Scottish Law Commission).
- Citation: 1997 c. 11
- Territorial extent: Scotland (Note: Section 6(5). The act does not extend to England or Wales or Northern Ireland except so far as it affects other enactments so extending. The repeals in part II of schedule 1 extend to Scotland only; those in part III extend to England and Wales only.)

Dates
- Royal assent: 27 February 1997
- Commencement: 27 May 1997 (Note: Section 6(2). The repeal in part I of schedule 1 relating to section 186 of the Town and Country Planning (Scotland) Act 1997 came into force on a day appointed by the Secretary of State by order under section 6(3).)
Other legislation
| Amends | Local Government (Scotland) Act 1966; Finance Act 1969; Zoo Licensing Act 1981; See § Repealed enactments |
| Repeals/revokes | See § Repealed enactments |
| Amended by | Statute Law (Repeals) Act 1998; Capital Allowances Act 2001; Building (Scotland) Act 2003; Communications Act 2003; Flood Risk Management (Scotland) Act 2009; Regulatory Reform (Scotland) Act 2014; Environmental Authorisations (Scotland) Regulations 2018; Historic Environment (Wales) Act 2023 |
| Relates to | Town and Country Planning (Scotland) Act 1997; Planning (Listed Buildings and Conservation Areas) (Scotland) Act 1997; Planning (Hazardous Substances) (Scotland) Act 1997 |

Status: Amended

Text of statute as originally enacted

Revised text of statute as amended

The Planning (Consequential Provisions) (Scotland) Act 1997 (c. 11) is an act of the Parliament of the United Kingdom that made provision for repeals, consequential amendments, transitional matters and savings in connection with the consolidation of certain enactments relating to town and country planning in Scotland, pursuant to recommendations of the Scottish Law Commission.

== Provisions ==
The act defines the consolidating acts (the Town and Country Planning (Scotland) Act 1997, the Planning (Listed Buildings and Conservation Areas) (Scotland) Act 1997 and the Planning (Hazardous Substances) (Scotland) Act 1997) and makes provision for the continuity of the law and construction of references to old and new law. Schedule 2 to the act sets out consequential amendments to other legislation, and Schedule 3 contains transitional provisions and savings.

=== Repealed enactments ===
Section 3 of the act repealed 47 enactments, listed in parts I, II and III of schedule 1 to the act, respectively.

Part I — General
| Citation | Short title | Extent of repeal |
|---|---|---|
| 10 & 11 Geo. 6. c. 53 | Town and Country Planning (Scotland) Act 1947 | Section 46(8). |
| 10 & 11 Geo. 6. c. 53 | Town and Country Planning (Scotland) Act 1947 | In Schedule 8, the entry relating to the Building Restrictions (War-time Contraventions) Act 1946. |
| 14 & 15 Geo. 6. c. 60 | Mineral Workings Act 1951 | Section 32. |
| 14 & 15 Geo. 6. c. 60 | Mineral Workings Act 1951 | Section 40(6). |
| 1967 c. 69 | Civic Amenities Act 1967 | Section 5. |
| 1967 c. 69 | Civic Amenities Act 1967 | In section 30(1), the definition of "the Scottish Planning Act". |
| 1969 c. 48 | Post Office Act 1969 | In Schedule 4, paragraph 92; and in paragraph 93, in sub-paragraph (1), paragraph (xxxiv) and the words from "Subject to" to the end, and sub-paragraph (4)(k). |
| 1969 c. 48 | Post Office Act 1969 | In Schedule 9, paragraph 27(8) and (11). |
| 1972 c. 42 | Town and Country Planning (Amendment) Act 1972 | The whole act. |
| 1972 c. 52 | Town and Country Planning (Scotland) Act 1972 | The whole act. |
| 1973 c. 56 | Land Compensation (Scotland) Act 1973 | In section 49(5) the words from "sections 169" to "or". |
| 1973 c. 56 | Land Compensation (Scotland) Act 1973 | Sections 64 to 69. |
| 1973 c. 56 | Land Compensation (Scotland) Act 1973 | Sections 71 to 77. |
| 1973 c. 65 | Local Government (Scotland) Act 1973 | Section 171C(b). |
| 1973 c. 65 | Local Government (Scotland) Act 1973 | Section 172. |
| 1973 c. 65 | Local Government (Scotland) Act 1973 | Section 175. |
| 1973 c. 65 | Local Government (Scotland) Act 1973 | In Schedule 23, paragraphs 6 and 16 to 34. |
| 1974 c. 32 | Town and Country Amenities Act 1974 | Section 2(1). |
| 1974 c. 32 | Town and Country Amenities Act 1974 | Section 3(2). |
| 1974 c. 32 | Town and Country Amenities Act 1974 | Section 4(2) and (3). |
| 1974 c. 32 | Town and Country Amenities Act 1974 | Section 6. |
| 1974 c. 32 | Town and Country Amenities Act 1974 | Section 7(2). |
| 1974 c. 32 | Town and Country Amenities Act 1974 | Section 9. |
| 1974 c. 32 | Town and Country Amenities Act 1974 | Section 11. |
| 1974 c. 32 | Town and Country Amenities Act 1974 | In section 13, subsection (1)(b); and in subsection (2), the words from "and in section" to the end. |
| 1977 c. 10 | Town and Country Planning (Scotland) Act 1977 | The whole act. |
| 1979 c. 46 | Ancient Monuments and Archaeological Areas Act 1979 | Section 48(1). |
| 1979 c. 46 | Ancient Monuments and Archaeological Areas Act 1979 | In Schedule 4, paragraph 12. |
| 1980 c. 65 | Local Government, Planning and Land Act 1980 | Section 87. |
| 1980 c. 65 | Local Government, Planning and Land Act 1980 | In section 92, subsections (1) to (8); and in subsection (9), the words from "section 87" to "that,". |
| 1980 c. 65 | Local Government, Planning and Land Act 1980 | In section 122, in subsection (1) the words "or section 103 of the Town and Country Planning (Scotland) Act 1972" and "or as the case may be 103"; in subsections (2), (3), and (8) the words "and 103"; and in subsection (6) the words "or 103". |
| 1980 c. 65 | Local Government, Planning and Land Act 1980 | Section 147. |
| 1980 c. 65 | Local Government, Planning and Land Act 1980 | In section 149, in subsection (6), the words from "in place of" to "authority" in the third place where it occurs; in subsection (8)(a), the words from "and in place" to "them"; and subsection (10). |
| 1980 c. 65 | Local Government, Planning and Land Act 1980 | In Schedule 32, paragraphs 5(8), 15(2)(b), 17, 19, 20(2), 21, 22, 24, 25 and 26(1A). |
| 1981 c. 23 | Local Government (Miscellaneous Provisions) (Scotland) Act 1981 | Section 36. |
| 1981 c. 23 | Local Government (Miscellaneous Provisions) (Scotland) Act 1981 | In Schedule 2, paragraphs 16 to 25, 27 and 28. |
| 1981 c. 23 | Local Government (Miscellaneous Provisions) (Scotland) Act 1981 | In Schedule 3, paragraphs 13, 15 to 20, 22 and 23. |
| 1981 c. 36 | Town and Country Planning (Minerals) Act 1981 | The whole act. |
| 1981 c. 38 | British Telecommunications Act 1981 | In Schedule 3, paragraph 10(2)(d). |
| 1982 c. 16 | Civil Aviation Act 1982 | In Schedule 2, in paragraphs 4 and 5, the entries relating to the Town and Country Planning (Scotland) Act 1972; and paragraph 7. |
| 1982 c. 16 | Civil Aviation Act 1982 | In Schedule 10, paragraphs 4(c) and 8(c) and, in each case, the preceding "and". |
| 1982 c. 43 | Local Government and Planning (Scotland) Act 1982 | Sections 36 to 48. |
| 1982 c. 43 | Local Government and Planning (Scotland) Act 1982 | Schedule 2. |
| 1983 c. 47 | National Heritage Act 1983 | In Schedule 4, paragraph 22(6). |
| 1984 c. 10 | Town and Country Planning Act 1984 | The whole act. |
| 1984 c. 12 | Telecommunications Act 1984 | In Schedule 4, paragraph 54. |
| 1984 c. 54 | Roads (Scotland) Act 1984 | In Schedule 9, paragraphs 41, 70, 72(7) and (8). |
| 1985 c. 19 | Town and Country Planning (Compensation) Act 1985 | The whole act. |
| 1985 c. 52 | Town and Country Planning (Amendment) Act 1985 | The whole act. |
| 1986 c. 31 | Airports Act 1986 | In Schedule 2, in paragraph 1, in sub-paragraph (1), the entry for the Town and Country Planning (Scotland) Act 1972 and the words from "and for the purposes" to the end, and in sub-paragraph (2), the entry for the Town and Country Planning (Scotland) Act 1972. |
| 1986 c. 31 | Airports Act 1986 | In Schedule 4, paragraph 2. |
| 1986 c. 44 | Gas Act 1986 | In Schedule 7, paragraph 13. |
| 1986 c. 63 | Housing and Planning Act 1986 | Section 26. |
| 1986 c. 63 | Housing and Planning Act 1986 | Sections 35 to 38. |
| 1986 c. 63 | Housing and Planning Act 1986 | Sections 50 and 51. |
| 1986 c. 63 | Housing and Planning Act 1986 | Section 52(1)(a). |
| 1986 c. 63 | Housing and Planning Act 1986 | Section 54(2). |
| 1986 c. 63 | Housing and Planning Act 1986 | In section 58(2), the words from "in Part II" to "Schedule 6", the words from "in Part IV" to "Schedule 7" and the words "Part II of Schedule 9". |
| 1986 c. 63 | Housing and Planning Act 1986 | In Schedule 6, Parts III and IV. |
| 1986 c. 63 | Housing and Planning Act 1986 | In Schedule 7, Part II. |
| 1986 c. 63 | Housing and Planning Act 1986 | In Schedule 9, paragraphs 13 to 24. |
| 1986 c. 63 | Housing and Planning Act 1986 | In Schedule 11, paragraphs 28 to 60 and 62. |
| 1987 c. 3 | Coal Industry Act 1987 | In Schedule 1, paragraph 20. |
| 1987 c. 18 | Debtors (Scotland) Act 1987 | In Schedule 6, paragraph 15. |
| 1987 c. 26 | Housing (Scotland) Act 1987 | In Schedule 23, paragraphs 18 and 19(9) and (10). |
| 1988 c. 41 | Local Government Finance Act 1988 | In Schedule 12, paragraph 9. |
| 1989 c. 29 | Electricity Act 1989 | In Schedule 8, paragraph 7. |
| 1989 c. 29 | Electricity Act 1989 | In Schedule 16, in paragraph 1, in sub-paragraph (1), paragraph (xxiii) and in paragraph (xxvi) the words "and 67"; in paragraph 2, sub-paragraphs (2)(d) and (7)(a) and, in sub-paragraph (8), the words from "and section 204" to "1972"; and paragraph 3(2)(e). |
| 1990 c. 11 | Planning (Consequential Provisions) Act 1990 | In Schedule 2, paragraphs 3(3), 16, 24(2), 26, 27, 44(14)(c), 62, 68 and 70. |
| 1990 c. 19 | National Health Service and Community Care Act 1990 | In Schedule 8, paragraph 7. |
| 1990 c. 43 | Environmental Protection Act 1990 | In Schedule 13, paragraphs 11 to 13. |
| 1991 c. 22 | New Roads and Street Works Act 1991 | In Schedule 8, paragraph 104. |
| 1991 c. 28 | Natural Heritage (Scotland) Act 1991 | Section 6(8) and (9). |
| 1991 c. 34 | Planning and Compensation Act 1991 | Sections 33 to 59. |
| 1991 c. 34 | Planning and Compensation Act 1991 | Section 60(1) to (5), (7) and (8). |
| 1991 c. 34 | Planning and Compensation Act 1991 | Schedules 8 to 11. |
| 1991 c. 34 | Planning and Compensation Act 1991 | In Schedule 12, paragraphs 6 to 33. |
| 1991 c. 34 | Planning and Compensation Act 1991 | In Schedule 13, paragraphs 2 to 43 and 45 to 47. |
| 1991 c. 34 | Planning and Compensation Act 1991 | In Schedule 17, paragraphs 11, 12, 17 and 18. |
| 1991 c. 34 | Planning and Compensation Act 1991 | In Schedule 19, in Part IV, the entry relating to the Town and Country Planning (Scotland) Act 1972. |
| 1992 c. 53 | Tribunals and Inquiries Act 1992 | In Schedule 3, paragraphs 3 to 8. |
| 1994 c. 21 | Coal Industry Act 1994 | Section 68(2)(d)(v). |
| 1994 c. 21 | Coal Industry Act 1994 | In Schedule 9, paragraph 13. |
| 1994 c. 21 | Coal Industry Act 1994 | In Schedule 10, in paragraph 12, in sub-paragraph (1) the words from "and section" to "1972", and in sub-paragraph (2) the words from "or sections" to the end. |
| 1994 c. 39 | Local Government etc. (Scotland) Act 1994 | Section 33. |
| 1994 c. 39 | Local Government etc. (Scotland) Act 1994 | Schedule 4. |
| 1994 c. 39 | Local Government etc. (Scotland) Act 1994 | In Schedule 13, paragraphs 88 and 92(57). |
| 1995 c. 25 | Environment Act 1995 | In Schedule 22, paragraph 16. |
| 1995 c. 45 | Gas Act 1995 | In Schedule 4, paragraph 2(1)(xix), (2)(e) and (10)(d). |
| 1995 c. 49 | Town and Country Planning (Costs of Inquiries etc.) Act 1995 | Sections 3 and 4. |
| 1995 c. 49 | Town and Country Planning (Costs of Inquiries etc.) Act 1995 | In section 5, in subsection (2), the definition of "the 1972 Act"; and subsection (5). |
| 1997 c. 8 | Town and Country Planning (Scotland) Act 1997 | In section 186, subsections (1) and (2); and in subsection (3), the words from the beginning to "(2)". |

Part II — Scotland only
| Citation | Short title | Extent of repeal |
|---|---|---|
| 9 & 10 Geo. 6. c. 35 | Building Restrictions (War-Time Contraventions) Act 1946 | The whole act. |
| 1995 c. 25 | Environment Act 1995 | Section 96. |
| 1995 c. 25 | Environment Act 1995 | Schedules 13 and 14. |

Part III — England and Wales only
| Citation | Short title | Extent of repeal |
|---|---|---|
| 1995 c. 25 | Environment Act 1995 | In section 96, in subsection (2), the words "as they apply to England and Wales" and "(as so applying)"; subsection (3); in subsection (4) the words "and section 251A of the 1972 Act"; in subsection (5) the words "or, as the case may be, section 21 of the 1972 Act"; and in subsection (6) the definition of "the 1972 Act". |
| 1995 c. 25 | Environment Act 1995 | In Schedule 13, the words "as respects England and Wales" in each place where they occur; in paragraph 1, in sub-paragraph (1), in each of the definitions of "mineral planning authority", "old mining permission" and "owner", paragraph (b) and the preceding "and", and in sub-paragraph (7)(a) the words "or, as the case may be, section 233 of the 1972 Act"; in paragraph 2, sub-paragraph (4)(d) and (e) and, in sub-paragraph (6), paragraph (b) and the preceding "and"; in paragraph 7, in sub-paragraph (4)(d) the words "or (6)", and sub-paragraph (6); in paragraph 9, in sub-paragraph (2)(f) the words "or (4)", sub-paragraph (4) and, in sub-paragraph (5), the words "or, as respects Scotland, section 24 of the 1972 Act"; in paragraph 12(4)(a) the words "or, as the case may be, section 233 of the 1972 Act"; in paragraph 15, in sub-paragraph (4), paragraph (b) and the preceding "or" and the words "or, as the case may be, section 42 of the 1972 Act" in both places where they occur, in sub-paragraph (5) the words "or section 42 of the 1972 Act", and in sub-paragraph (6) the words "and section 167A of the 1972 Act"; and paragraph 16(5) to (7). |
| 1995 c. 25 | Environment Act 1995 | In Schedule 14, the words "as respects England and Wales" in each place where they occur; in paragraph 2, in sub-paragraph (1), in each of the definitions of "mineral planning authority", "old mining permission" and "owner", paragraph (b) and the preceding "and", and in sub-paragraph (4) the words "or section 233 of the 1972 Act"; in paragraph 3, in sub-paragraph (1) the words "or, as the case may be, paragraph 2 of Schedule 10A to the 1972 Act", "or, as the case may be, paragraph 10(2) of Schedule 10A to the 1972 Act" and "or, as the case may be, section 49H of and Schedule 10A to the 1972 Act", and in sub-paragraph (6) the words "or section 42 of the 1972 Act" and "or section 49 of the 1972 Act"; in paragraph 6, in sub-paragraph (2)(f), the words "or (4)", and sub-paragraph (4); paragraph 9(5) to (7); and in paragraph 13, in sub-paragraph (4) the words "and, as respects Scotland, Parts VIII and XI of the 1972 Act" and the words "or, as the case may be, section 42 of the 1972 Act" in both places where they occur, and in sub-paragraph (6) the words "and section 167A of the 1972 Act". |
