= List of acts of the Parliament of the United Kingdom from 1997 =

This is a list of acts of the Parliament of the United Kingdom passed in 1997.

Acts passed since 1963 are cited by calendar year, as opposed to the convention used for earlier acts of citing the regnal year(s) in which the relevant parliamentary session was held. Each act passed in a respective year is given a chapter number (abbreviated "c."), denoted by Arabic numerals in the case of public general acts, lowercase Roman numerals in the case of local acts, or italicised Arabic numerals in the case of personal acts. These run as separate series.

73 acts of Parliament were passed in 1997: 69 public general acts and 4 local acts.

indicates that an act has been transcribed on Wikisource, indicates that an act is available to view at legislation.gov.uk, and indicates the location of the original act in the Parliamentary Archives.

== Public general acts ==
| Short title | Citation | Royal assent |
Long title
| Horserace Totalisator Board Act 1997 (repealed) | 1997 c. 1 | 27 February 1997 |
An Act to confer power on the Horserace Totalisator Board to receive or negotiate bets made otherwise than by way of pool betting. (Repealed by Horserace Betting and Olympic Lottery Act 2004 (c. 25))
| Land Registration Act 1997 | 1997 c. 2 | 27 February 1997 |
An Act to amend the Land Registration Act 1925. (Note: Land Registration Act 1925 (15 & 16 Geo. 5. c. 21))
| Sea Fisheries (Shellfish) (Amendment) Act 1997 | 1997 c. 3 | 27 February 1997 |
An Act to make provision for fisheries for lobsters and other crustaceans.
| Telecommunications (Fraud) Act 1997 | 1997 c. 4 | 27 February 1997 |
An Act to amend the Telecommunications Act 1984 (Note: Telecommunications Act 1984 (c. 12)) to make further provision for the prevention of fraud in connection with use of a telecommunication system.
| Firearms (Amendment) Act 1997 | 1997 c. 5 | 27 February 1997 |
An Act to amend the Firearms Acts 1968 to 1992; to make provision in relation to the licensing and regulation of pistol clubs; to make further provision for regulating the possession of, and transactions relating to, firearms and ammunition; and for connected purposes.
| Local Government (Gaelic Names) (Scotland) Act 1997 | 1997 c. 6 | 27 February 1997 |
An Act to enable local authorities in Scotland to take Gaelic names; and for connected purposes.
| Northern Ireland Arms Decommissioning Act 1997 | 1997 c. 7 | 27 February 1997 |
An Act to make provision connected with Northern Ireland about the decommissioning of firearms, ammunition and explosives; and for connected purposes.
| Town and Country Planning (Scotland) Act 1997 | 1997 c. 8 | 27 February 1997 |
An Act to consolidate certain enactments relating to town and country planning in Scotland with amendments to give effect to recommendations of the Scottish Law Commission.
| Planning (Listed Buildings and Conservation Areas) (Scotland) Act 1997 | 1997 c. 9 | 27 February 1997 |
An Act to consolidate certain enactments relating to special controls in respect of buildings and areas of special architectural or historic interest with amendments to give effect to recommendations of the Scottish Law Commission.
| Planning (Hazardous Substances) (Scotland) Act 1997 | 1997 c. 10 | 27 February 1997 |
An Act to consolidate certain enactments relating to special controls in respect of hazardous substances with amendments to give effect to recommendations of the Scottish Law Commission.
| Planning (Consequential Provisions) (Scotland) Act 1997 | 1997 c. 11 | 27 February 1997 |
An Act to make provision for repeals, consequential amendments, transitional matters and savings in connection with the consolidation of enactments in the Town and Country Planning (Scotland) Act 1997, (Note: Town and Country Planning (Scotland) Act 1997 (c. 8)) the Planning (Listed Buildings and Conservation Areas) (Scotland) Act 1997 (Note: Planning (Listed Buildings and Conservation Areas) (Scotland) Act 1997 (c. 9)) and the Planning (Hazardous Substances) (Scotland) Act 1997 (Note: Planning (Hazardous Substances) (Scotland) Act 1997 (c. 10)) (including provisions to give effect to recommendations of the Scottish Law Commission).
| Civil Procedure Act 1997 | 1997 c. 12 | 27 February 1997 |
An Act to amend the law about civil procedure in England and Wales; and for connected purposes.
| United Nations Personnel Act 1997 | 1997 c. 13 | 27 February 1997 |
An Act to enable effect to be given to certain provisions of the Convention on the Safety of United Nations and Associated Personnel adopted by the General Assembly of the United Nations on 9th December 1994.
| National Heritage Act 1997 | 1997 c. 14 | 27 February 1997 |
An Act to extend the powers of the Trustees of the National Heritage Memorial Fund.
| Consolidated Fund Act 1997 (repealed) | 1997 c. 15 | 19 March 1997 |
An Act to apply certain sums out of the Consolidated Fund to the service of the years ending on 31st March 1996 and 1997. (Repealed by Appropriation Act 1999 (c. 13))
| Finance Act 1997 | 1997 c. 16 | 19 March 1997 |
An Act to grant certain duties, to alter other duties, and to amend the law relating to the National Debt and the Public Revenue, and to make further provision in connection with Finance.
| Criminal Evidence (Amendment) Act 1997 | 1997 c. 17 | 19 March 1997 |
An Act to make provision extending the categories of persons from whom non-intimate body samples may be taken without consent under Part V of the Police and Criminal Evidence Act 1984; (Note: Police and Criminal Evidence Act 1984 (c. 60)) and to add a further time limit to those operating for the purposes of section 63A(4)(a) of that Act.
| Policyholders Protection Act 1997 (repealed) | 1997 c. 18 | 19 March 1997 |
An Act to amend the Policyholders Protection Act 1975; (Note: Policyholders Protection Act 1975 (c. 75)) and for connected purposes. (Repealed by Financial Services and Markets Act 2000 (Consequential Amendments and Repeals) Order 2001 (SI 2001/3649))
| Pharmacists (Fitness to Practise) Act 1997 (repealed) | 1997 c. 19 | 19 March 1997 |
An Act to make provision about finding registered pharmaceutical chemists unfit to practise due to ill health; and for connected purposes. (Repealed by Pharmacists and Pharmacy Technicians Order 2007 (SI 2007/289))
| British Nationality (Hong Kong) Act 1997 | 1997 c. 20 | 19 March 1997 |
An Act to provide for the acquisition of British citizenship by certain British nationals in Hong Kong.
| Knives Act 1997 | 1997 c. 21 | 19 March 1997 |
An Act to create new criminal offences in relation to the possession or marketing of, and publications relating to, knives; to confer powers on the police to stop and search people or vehicles for knives and other offensive weapons and to seize items found; and for connected purposes.
| Architects Act 1997 | 1997 c. 22 | 19 March 1997 |
An Act to consolidate the enactments relating to architects.
| Lieutenancies Act 1997 | 1997 c. 23 | 19 March 1997 |
An Act to consolidate certain enactments relating to the lieutenancies in Great Britain.
| Nurses, Midwives and Health Visitors Act 1997 (repealed) | 1997 c. 24 | 19 March 1997 |
An Act to consolidate the Nurses, Midwives and Health Visitors Act 1979 (Note: Nurses, Midwives and Health Visitors Act 1979 (c. 36)) and the enactments amending it. (Repealed by Health Act 1999 (c. 8))
| Justices of the Peace Act 1997 (repealed) | 1997 c. 25 | 19 March 1997 |
An Act to consolidate the Justices of the Peace Act 1979 and provisions of Part IV of the Police and Magistrates' Courts Act 1994. (Note: Police and Magistrates' Courts Act 1994 (c. 29)) (Repealed by Courts Act 2003 (c.39))
| Transfer of Crofting Estates (Scotland) Act 1997 | 1997 c. 26 | 19 March 1997 |
An Act to enable the Secretary of State to dispose of his crofting estates and certain other property of his in the crofting counties to approved crofting bodies; and for connected purposes.
| Social Security (Recovery of Benefits) Act 1997 | 1997 c. 27 | 19 March 1997 |
An Act to re-state, with amendments, Part IV of the Social Security Administration Act 1992. (Note: Social Security Administration Act 1992 (c. 5))
| Merchant Shipping and Maritime Security Act 1997 | 1997 c. 28 | 19 March 1997 |
An Act to amend the Merchant Shipping Act 1995; (Note: Merchant Shipping Act 1995 (c. 21)) to extend the powers of fire authorities to use fire brigades and equipment at sea; to make further provision about the protection of wrecks; to amend Part III of the Aviation and Maritime Security Act 1990; (Note: Aviation and Maritime Security Act 1990 (c. 31)) to make provision about piracy; to provide for the continuing application to the International Oil Pollution Compensation Fund of section 1 of the International Organisations Act 1968; (Note: International Organisations Act 1968 (c. 48)) to make provision about the International Tribunal for the Law of the Sea; and for connected purposes.
| Local Government and Rating Act 1997 | 1997 c. 29 | 19 March 1997 |
An Act to make further provision about non-domestic rating; to make further provision about parishes and parish councils; to confer additional powers on parish councils and community councils; and for connected purposes.
| Police (Property) Act 1997 | 1997 c. 30 | 19 March 1997 |
An Act to make further provision with respect to property in the possession of the police.
| Appropriation Act 1997 (repealed) | 1997 c. 31 | 21 March 1997 |
An Act to apply a sum out of the Consolidated Fund to the service of the year ending on 31st March 1998; to appropriate the supplies granted in this Session of Parliament; and to repeal certain Consolidated Fund and Appropriation Acts. (Repealed by Appropriation Act 1999 (c. 13))
| Building Societies Act 1997 | 1997 c. 32 | 21 March 1997 |
An Act to amend the Building Societies Act 1986; (Note: Building Societies Act 1986 (c. 53)) to make provision for amalgamating the Building Societies Investor Protection Board and the Deposit Protection Board into a single board and the Building Societies Investor Protection Fund and the Deposit Protection Fund into a single fund; and for connected purposes.
| Confiscation of Alcohol (Young Persons) Act 1997 | 1997 c. 33 | 21 March 1997 |
An Act to permit the confiscation of intoxicating liquor held by or for use by young persons in public and certain other places; and for connected purposes.
| Contract (Scotland) Act 1997 | 1997 c. 34 | 21 March 1997 |
An Act to reform the law of Scotland relating to the admissibility of extrinsic evidence to prove an additional term of a contract or unilateral voluntary obligation, to the supersession of a contract by a deed executed in implement of it and to the obtaining of damages for breach of contract of sale; and for connected purposes.
| Scottish Legal Services Ombudsman and Commissioner for Local Administration in Scotland Act 1997 | 1997 c. 35 | 21 March 1997 |
An Act to make further provision about the Scottish legal services ombudsman; to alter the jurisdiction of the Commissioner for Local Administration in Scotland; and for connected purposes.
| Flood Prevention and Land Drainage (Scotland) Act 1997 (repealed) | 1997 c. 36 | 21 March 1997 |
An Act to amend the Flood Prevention (Scotland) Act 1961 (Note: Flood Prevention (Scotland) Act 1961 (9 & 10 Eliz. 2. c. 41)) in relation to flood prevention measures to be taken by local authorities; to repeal section 11(2) of the Land Drainage (Scotland) Act 1930 (Note: Land Drainage (Scotland) Act 1930 (20 & 21 Geo. 5. c. 20)) and section 8(2) of the Land Drainage (Scotland) Act 1941; (Note: Land Drainage (Scotland) Act 1941 (4 & 5 Geo. 6. c. 13)) and for connected purposes. (Repealed by Flood Risk Management (Scotland) Act 2009 (asp 6))
| Welsh Development Agency Act 1997 | 1997 c. 37 | 21 March 1997 |
An Act to make provision with respect to the financial limit in section 18(3) of the Welsh Development Agency Act 1975.
| Prisons (Alcohol Testing) Act 1997 | 1997 c. 38 | 21 March 1997 |
An Act to enable prisoners in England and Wales, and other persons to whom provisions of the Prison Act 1952 (Note: Prison Act 1952 (15 & 16 Geo. 6 & 1 Eliz. 2. c. 52)) are applied by section 43 of that Act, to be tested for alcohol.
| Sexual Offences (Protected Material) Act 1997 | 1997 c. 39 | 21 March 1997 |
An Act to make provision for regulating access by defendants and others to certain categories of material disclosed by the prosecution or by the Criminal Cases Review Commission in connection with proceedings relating to certain sexual and other offences.
| Protection from Harassment Act 1997 | 1997 c. 40 | 21 March 1997 |
An Act to make provision for protecting persons from harassment and similar conduct.
| Building Societies (Distributions) Act 1997 | 1997 c. 41 | 21 March 1997 |
An Act to amend the law in respect of distribution of assets on the take-over or conversion of a building society.
| Police (Health and Safety) Act 1997 | 1997 c. 42 | 21 March 1997 |
An Act to make provision about the health, safety and welfare at work of members of police forces, special constables, other persons having the powers or privileges of a constable, and police cadets; and for connected purposes.
| Crime (Sentences) Act 1997 | 1997 c. 43 | 21 March 1997 |
An Act to make further provision with respect to the treatment of offenders; and for connected purposes.
| Education Act 1997 | 1997 c. 44 | 21 March 1997 |
An Act to amend the law relating to education in schools and further education in England and Wales; to make provision for the supervision of the awarding of external academic and vocational qualifications in England, Wales and Northern Ireland; and for connected purposes.
| Police (Insurance of Voluntary Assistants) Act 1997 (repealed) | 1997 c. 45 | 21 March 1997 |
An Act to provide for the insurance by police authorities and the Receiver for the Metropolitan Police District of persons providing voluntary assistance for police purposes. (Repealed by Statute Law (Repeals) Act 2008 (c. 12))
| National Health Service (Primary Care) Act 1997 | 1997 c. 46 | 21 March 1997 |
An Act to provide for new arrangements in relation to the provision within the national health service of medical, dental, pharmaceutical and other services; to make provision about medical lists and vacancies and the sale of medical practices; to make provision about the expenditure of Health Authorities and Health Boards; to make provision about ophthalmic services; and for connected purposes.
| Social Security Administration (Fraud) Act 1997 | 1997 c. 47 | 21 March 1997 |
An Act to amend the law relating to social security offences and to make other amendments of the law relating to the administration of social security.
| Crime and Punishment (Scotland) Act 1997 | 1997 c. 48 | 21 March 1997 |
An Act to make provision as respects Scotland in relation to criminal appeals, the disposal of offenders, criminal procedure, evidence in criminal proceedings, the treatment and early release of prisoners, offences committed by newly released prisoners, criminal legal assistance, the police, confiscation of alcohol from persons under 18, sex offenders and the payment by the Lord Advocate of grants for the provision of forensic medical services; to enable courts in England and Wales and Northern Ireland to remit offenders to courts in Scotland in certain circumstances; to make amendments consequential upon the provisions of this Act to the law in other parts of the United Kingdom; and for connected purposes.
| Public Entertainments Licences (Drug Misuse) Act 1997 (repealed) | 1997 c. 49 | 21 March 1997 |
An Act to amend the law about public entertainments licences relating to places at or near which controlled drugs are supplied or used and for connected purposes. (Repealed by Licensing Act 2003 (c. 17))
| Police Act 1997 | 1997 c. 50 | 21 March 1997 |
An Act to make provision for the National Criminal Intelligence Service and the National Crime Squad; to make provision about entry on and interference with property and with wireless telegraphy in the course of the prevention or detection of serious crime; to make provision for the Police Information Technology Organisation; to provide for the issue of certificates about criminal records; to make provision about the administration and organisation of the police; to repeal certain enactments about rehabilitation of offenders; and for connected purposes.
| Sex Offenders Act 1997 (repealed) | 1997 c. 51 | 21 March 1997 |
An Act to require the notification of information to the police by persons who have committed certain sexual offences; to make provision with respect to the commission of certain sexual acts outside the United Kingdom; and for connected purposes. (Repealed by Sexual Offences Act 2003 (c. 42))
| Police and Firemen's Pensions Act 1997 | 1997 c. 52 | 21 March 1997 |
An Act to amend the Police Pensions Act 1976 (Note: Police Pensions Act 1976 (c. 35)) and the Fire Services Act 1947 (Note: Fire Services Act 1947 (10 & 11 Geo. 6. c. 41)) so as to make provision in respect of transfer values and other lump sum payments and permit police and fire authorities to provide information relating to pension schemes.
| Dangerous Dogs (Amendment) Act 1997 | 1997 c. 53 | 21 March 1997 |
An Act to amend the Dangerous Dogs Act 1991; (Note: Dangerous Dogs Act 1991 (c. 65)) and for connected purposes.
| Road Traffic Reduction Act 1997 | 1997 c. 54 | 21 March 1997 |
An Act to require local authorities to prepare reports relating to the levels of road traffic in their areas; and for related purposes.
| Birds (Registration Charges) Act 1997 | 1997 c. 55 | 21 March 1997 |
An Act to make provision (including provision having retrospective effect) authorising the Secretary of State to impose charges in respect of registrations effected in accordance with regulations under section 6(2) or 7(1) of the Wildlife and Countryside Act 1981. (Note: Wildlife and Countryside Act 1981 (c. 69))
| National Health Service (Private Finance) Act 1997 | 1997 c. 56 | 15 July 1997 |
An Act to make provision about the powers of National Health Service trusts to enter into agreements.
| Appropriation (No. 2) Act 1997 | 1997 c. 57 | 31 July 1997 |
An Act to apply certain sums out of the Consolidated Fund to the service of the year ending on 31st March 1998 and to appropriate the supplies granted in this Session of Parliament.
| Finance (No. 2) Act 1997 | 1997 c. 58 | 31 July 1997 |
An Act to grant certain duties, to alter other duties, and to amend the law relating to the National Debt and the Public Revenue, and to make further provision in connection with Finance.
| Education (Schools) Act 1997 | 1997 c. 59 | 31 July 1997 |
An Act to make provision for and in connection with the ending of the assisted places schemes in England and Wales and in Scotland.
| Law Officers Act 1997 | 1997 c. 60 | 31 July 1997 |
An Act to enable functions of the Attorney General and of the Attorney General for Northern Ireland to be exercised by the Solicitor General; and for connected purposes.
| Referendums (Scotland and Wales) Act 1997 | 1997 c. 61 | 31 July 1997 |
An Act to make provision for the holding of a referendum in Scotland on the establishment and tax-varying powers of a Scottish Parliament and a referendum in Wales on the establishment of a Welsh Assembly; and for expenditure in preparation for a Scottish Parliament or a Welsh Assembly.
| Ministerial and other Salaries Act 1997 | 1997 c. 62 | 6 November 1997 |
An Act to make provision for the alteration of salaries payable under the Ministerial and other Salaries Act 1975. (Note: Ministerial and other Salaries Act 1975 (c. 27))
| Local Government Finance (Supplementary Credit Approvals) Act 1997 (repealed) | 1997 c. 63 | 6 November 1997 |
An Act to permit account to be taken of the reserved part of capital receipts in determining the amount of a supplementary credit approval to be issued to a local authority; and to substitute a power for the existing duty to specify an amortisation period when issuing a supplementary credit approval to a local authority in respect of expenditure treated by the authority as expenditure for capital purposes. (Repealed by Local Government Act 2003 (c. 26))
| Firearms (Amendment) (No. 2) Act 1997 | 1997 c. 64 | 27 November 1997 |
An Act to extend the class of prohibited weapons under the Firearms Act 1968 (Note: Firearms Act 1968 (c. 27)) to include small-calibre pistols.
| Local Government (Contracts) Act 1997 | 1997 c. 65 | 27 November 1997 |
An Act to make provision about the powers of local authorities (including probation committees and the Receiver for the Metropolitan Police District) to enter into contracts; to enable expenditure of local authorities making administrative arrangements for magistrates' courts to be treated for some purposes as not being capital expenditure; and for connected purposes.
| Plant Varieties Act 1997 | 1997 c. 66 | 27 November 1997 |
An Act to make provision about rights in relation to plant varieties; to make provision about the Plant Varieties and Seeds Tribunal; to extend the time limit for institution of proceedings for contravention of seeds regulations; and for connected purposes.
| Consolidated Fund (No. 2) Act 1997 (repealed) | 1997 c. 67 | 17 December 1997 |
An Act to apply certain sums out of the Consolidated Fund to the service of the years ending on 31st March 1998 and 1999. (Repealed by Appropriation Act 1999 (c. 13))
| Special Immigration Appeals Commission Act 1997 | 1997 c. 68 | 17 December 1997 |
An Act to establish the Special Immigration Appeals Commission; to make provision with respect to its jurisdiction; and for connected purposes.
| Senior Courts (Offices) Act 1997 or the Supreme Court (Offices) Act 1997 (Note: The Senior Courts (Offices) Act 1997 originally had the short title of the Supreme Court (Offices) Act 1997, but this was amended by the Constitutional Reform Act 2005 (c. 4) on 1 October 2009. Unusually, this occurred after the act was repealed on 22 July 2004.) (repealed) | 1997 c. 69 | 17 December 1997 |
An Act to make provision with respect to the qualification for appointment as, and tenure of office of, Permanent Secretary to the Lord Chancellor and Clerk of the Crown in Chancery. (Repealed by Statute Law (Repeals) Act 2004 (c. 14))

== Local acts ==
| Short title | Citation | Royal assent |
Long title
| Southampton International Boat Show Act 1997 | 1997 c. i | 15 July 1997 |
An Act to amend section 60 of the Hampshire Act 1983 (Note: Hampshire Act 1983 (c. v)) to permit closure of Mayflower Park in Southampton or the restriction of public access to it for 10 rather than 9 consecutive days each year for the purposes of the Southampton International Boat Show; and for connected purposes.
| Imperial College Act 1997 | 1997 c. ii | 15 July 1997 |
An Act to unite the Charing Cross and Westminster Medical School and the Royal Postgraduate Medical School with the Imperial College of Science, Technology and Medicine; to transfer all rights, properties, assets and liabilities from those medical schools to the said College; to make provision with respect to the merger of the National Heart and Lung Institute with the said College; and for connected purposes.
| King's College London Act 1997 | 1997 c. iii | 31 July 1997 |
An Act to unite the United Medical and Dental Schools of Guy's and St. Thomas's Hospitals and King's College London; to transfer all rights, properties and liabilities from the Schools to the College; and for connected and other purposes.
| Scottish Agricultural College Order Confirmation Act 1997 | 1997 c. iv | 17 December 1997 |
An Act to confirm a Provisional Order under the Private Legislation Procedure (Scotland) Act 1936, (Note: Private Legislation Procedure (Scotland) Act 1936 (26 Geo. 5 & 1 Edw. 8. c. 52)) relating to Scottish Agricultural College.
| | Scottish Agricultural College Order 1997 Provisional Order to transfer the assets of The East of Scotland College of Agriculture, The North of Scotland College of Agriculture and The West of Scotland College to The Scottish Agricultural College; and for other purposes incidental thereto. | |

== See also ==
- List of acts of the Parliament of the United Kingdom
