= Imperial College Act 1997 =

Act of the Parliament of the United Kingdom

- Act of Parliament
- Parliament of the United Kingdom
- Long title: An Act to unite the Charing Cross and Westminster Medical School and the Royal Postgraduate Medical School with the Imperial College of Science, Technology and Medicine; to transfer all rights, properties, assets and liabilities from those medical schools to the said College; to make provision with respect to the merger of the National Heart and Lung Institute with the said College; and for connected purposes.
- Citation: 1997 c. ii

Dates
- Royal assent: 15 July 1997

Text of the Imperial College Act 1997 as in force today (including any amendments) within the United Kingdom, from legislation.gov.uk.

The Imperial College Act 1997 (c. ii) is a local Act of the Parliament of the United Kingdom. It is a minor piece of legislation that enabled Imperial College London to take over the Charing Cross and Westminster Medical School, the National Heart and Lung Institute and the Royal Postgraduate Medical School.

In 1988, Imperial College had already taken over St Mary's Hospital Medical School, creating the Imperial College School of Medicine (now the college's Faculty of Medicine), into which these additional medical schools were merged.

The act itself transferred all the property, powers, rights and obligations of the three medical schools to Imperial College. It dissolved the three schools, revoked the charter of the Royal Postgraduate Medical School and repealed the Charing Cross and Westminster Medical School Act 1984. It also restricted the use of the names of the three medical schools: for the 25 years from the passing of the act, only those permitted by Imperial College may use the names.
