= List of Scottish statutory instruments, 2017 =

This is a complete list of Scottish statutory instruments in 2017.

== Scottish statutory instruments ==
=== 1-100 ===
- The North East Scotland Trunk Roads (Temporary Prohibitions of Traffic and Overtaking and Temporary Speed Restrictions) Order 2017 (S.S.I. 2017 No. 1)
- The South West Scotland Trunk Roads (Temporary Prohibitions of Traffic and Overtaking and Temporary Speed Restrictions) Order 2017 (S.S.I. 2017 No. 2)
- The A96 Trunk Road (Brodie) (50 mph Speed Limit) Order 2017 (S.S.I. 2017 No. 3)
- Act of Sederunt (Rules of the Court of Session 1994 Amendment) (Leave to Appeal) 2017 (S.S.I. 2017 No. 4)
- The Asset Transfer Request (Designation of Relevant Authority) (Scotland) Order 2017 (S.S.I. 2017 No. 5)
- The Plant Health (Import Inspection Fees) (Scotland) Amendment Regulations 2017 (S.S.I. 2017 No. 6)
- The Title Conditions (Scotland) Act 2003 (Rural Housing Bodies) Amendment Order 2017 (S.S.I. 2017 No. 7)
- The Non-Domestic Rate (Scotland) Order 2017 (S.S.I. 2017 No. 8)
- The Non-Domestic Rates (Levying) (Scotland) Regulations 2017 (S.S.I. 2017 No. 9)
- The A78 Trunk Road (Inverkip) (Temporary Prohibition On Use of Road) Order 2017 (S.S.I. 2017 No. 10)
- Not Allocated (S.S.I. 2017 No. 11)
- The Health (Tobacco, Nicotine etc. and Care) (Scotland) Act 2016 (Commencement No. 1) Regulations 2017 (S.S.I. 2017 No. 12 (C. 2))
- The Sale of Nicotine Vapour Products (Prescribed Documents) (Scotland) Regulations 2017 (S.S.I. 2017 No. 13)
- The M9/A9 Trunk Road (Gleneagles Station to Auchterarder) (Redetermination of Means of Exercise of Public Right of Passage) Order 2017 (S.S.I. 2017 No. 14)
- The North East Scotland Trunk Roads (Temporary Prohibitions of Traffic and Temporary Speed Restrictions) Order 2017 (S.S.I. 2017 No. 15)
- The South West Scotland Trunk Roads (Temporary Prohibitions of Traffic and Temporary Speed Restrictions) Order 2017 (S.S.I. 2017 No. 16)
- The South East Scotland Trunk Roads (Temporary Prohibitions of Traffic and Overtaking and Temporary Speed Restrictions) Order 2017 (S.S.I. 2017 No. 17)
- The North West Scotland Trunk Roads (Temporary Prohibitions of Traffic and Overtaking and Temporary Speed Restrictions) Order 2017 (S.S.I. 2017 No. 18)
- The A9 Trunk Road (McDiarmid Park) (Temporary 30 mph Speed Restriction) Order 2017 (S.S.I. 2017 No. 19)
- The Land Reform (Scotland) Act 2016 (Commencement No. 5 and Transitory Provisions) Regulations 2017 (S.S.I. 2017 No. 20 (C. 3))
- The A87 Trunk Road (Portree) (40 mph and 30 mph Speed Limits and Part-Time 20 mph Speed Limit) Order 2017 (S.S.I. 2017 No. 21)
- The Non-Domestic Rates (Rural Areas) (Scotland) Regulations 2017 (S.S.I. 2017 No. 22)
- The Scottish Landfill Tax (Standard Rate and Lower Rate) Order 2017 (S.S.I. 2017 No. 23)
- The A725 Trunk Road (Raith) (Temporary 40 mph Speed Restriction and Prohibition of Specified Classes of Traffic and Pedestrians) Order 2017 (S.S.I. 2017 No. 24)
- The A78 Trunk Road (Gallowgate Street, Largs) (Temporary Traffic Restrictions) Order 2017 (S.S.I. 2017 No. 25)
- Act of Sederunt (Rules of the Court of Session 1994 Amendment) (Temporary Exclusion Orders) 2017 (S.S.I. 2017 No. 26)
- The National Health Service Superannuation Scheme (Miscellaneous Amendments) (Scotland) Regulations 2017 (S.S.I. 2017 No. 27)
- The National Health Service Pension Scheme (Scotland) (Miscellaneous Amendments) Regulations 2017 (S.S.I. 2017 No. 28)
- The A90 & A96 Trunk Roads (Haudagain Improvement) (Side Roads) Order 2017 (S.S.I. 2017 No. 29)
- The A90 & A96 Trunk Roads (Middlefield Place to Auchmill Terrace) Detrunking Order 2017 (S.S.I. 2017 No. 30)
- The A90 Trunk Road (Charleston to Blackdog) Detrunking (Variation) Order 2017 (S.S.I. 2017 No. 31)
- The A96 Trunk Road (Dyce Drive to Haudagain Roundabout) Detrunking (Variation) Order 2017 (S.S.I. 2017 No. 32)
- The Community Justice (Scotland) Act 2016 (Commencement No. 2, Transitional and Saving Provisions) Regulations 2017 (S.S.I. 2017 No. 33 (C. 4))
- The M876/A876 Trunk Road (Kincardine) (Temporary Prohibition of Specified Turns) Order 2017 (S.S.I. 2017 No. 34)
- The A738 Trunk Road (Stevenston Road, Pennyburn) (Redetermination of Means of Exercise of Public Right of Passage) Order 2017 (S.S.I. 2017 No. 35)
- The Crown Estate Scotland (Interim Management) Order 2017 (S.S.I. 2017 No. 36)
- The Bankruptcy Fees (Scotland) Regulations 2017 (S.S.I. 2017 No. 37)
- The Animal Feed (Scotland) Amendment Regulations 2017 (S.S.I. 2017 No. 38)
- The Participation Request (Procedure) (Scotland) Regulations 2017 (S.S.I. 2017 No. 39)
- The Community Empowerment (Scotland) Act 2015 (Commencement No. 7) Order 2017 (S.S.I. 2017 No. 40 (C. 5))
- The Council Tax Reduction (Scotland) Amendment Regulations 2017 (S.S.I. 2017 No. 41)
- The Non-Domestic Rating (Valuation of Utilities) (Scotland) Amendment Order 2017 (S.S.I. 2017 No. 42)
- The Non-Domestic Rating (Unoccupied Property) (Scotland) Amendment Regulations 2017 (S.S.I. 2017 No. 43)
- The North West Scotland Trunk Roads (Temporary Prohibitions of Traffic and Overtaking and Temporary Speed Restrictions) (No. 2) Order 2017 (S.S.I. 2017 No. 44)
- The South East Scotland Trunk Roads (Temporary Prohibitions of Traffic and Overtaking and Temporary Speed Restrictions) (No. 2) Order 2017 (S.S.I. 2017 No. 45)
- The South West Scotland Trunk Roads (Temporary Prohibitions of Traffic and Overtaking and Temporary Speed Restrictions) (No. 2) Order 2017 (S.S.I. 2017 No. 46)
- The North East Scotland Trunk Roads (Temporary Prohibitions of Traffic and Overtaking and Temporary Speed Restrictions) (No. 2) Order 2017 (S.S.I. 2017 No. 47)
- The Inshore Fishing (Prohibition of Fishing and Fishing Methods) (Outer Hebrides) Order 2017 (S.S.I. 2017 No. 48)
- The Scottish Road Works Register (Prescribed Fees) Regulations 2017 (S.S.I. 2017 No. 49)
- The Sale of Tobacco and Nicotine Vapour Products by Persons Under 18 (Scotland) Regulations 2017 (S.S.I. 2017 No. 50)
- The Sale of Tobacco (Register of Tobacco Retailers) (Scotland) Amendment Regulations 2017 (S.S.I. 2017 No. 51)
- Act of Sederunt (Rules of the Court of Session 1994 and Ordinary Cause Rules 1993 Amendment) (Pursuers’ Offers) 2017 (S.S.I. 2017 No. 52)
- Act of Sederunt (Fees of Solicitors in the Court of Session and Sheriff Court Amendment) (Pursuers’ Offers) 2017 (S.S.I. 2017 No. 53)
- The Wick Harbour Revision Order 2017 (S.S.I. 2017 No. 54)
- The A78 Trunk Road (Gallowgate Street, Largs) (Temporary Prohibition On Use) Order 2017 (S.S.I. 2017 No. 55)
- The A893 Trunk Road (Ullapool) (Temporary Prohibition on Waiting, Loading and Unloading) Order 2017 (S.S.I. 2017 No. 56)
- The Shellfish (Restrictions on Taking by Unlicensed Fishing Boats) (Scotland) Order 2017 (S.S.I. 2017 No. 57)
- The Personal Injuries (NHS Charges) (Amounts) (Scotland) Amendment Regulations 2017 (S.S.I. 2017 No. 58)
- The National Health Service (Payments and Remission of Charges) (Miscellaneous Amendments) (Scotland) Regulations 2017 (S.S.I. 2017 No. 59)
- The Non-Domestic Rates (Renewable Energy Generation Relief) (Scotland) Amendment Regulations 2017 (S.S.I. 2017 No. 60)
- The Non-Domestic Rates (District Heating Relief) (Scotland) Regulations 2017 (S.S.I. 2017 No. 61)
- The Continuing Care (Scotland) Amendment Order 2017 (S.S.I. 2017 No. 62)
- The Protection of Seals (Designation of Haul-Out Sites) (Scotland) Amendment Order 2017 (S.S.I. 2017 No. 63)
- The Representation of the People (Absent Voting at Local Government Elections) (Scotland) Amendment Regulations 2017 (S.S.I. 2017 No. 64)
- The Schools (Consultation) (Scotland) Act 2010 (Modification) Regulations 2017 (S.S.I. 2017 No. 65)
- The Local Governance (Scotland) Act 2004 (Remuneration) Amendment Regulations 2017 (S.S.I. 2017 No. 66)
- The National Health Service (Scotland) Act 1978 (Independent Clinic) Amendment Order 2017 (S.S.I. 2017 No. 67)
- The First-tier Tribunal for Scotland Housing and Property Chamber (Procedure) Amendment Regulations 2017 (S.S.I. 2017 No. 68)
- The First-tier Tribunal for Scotland Tax Chamber (Procedure) Regulations 2017 (S.S.I. 2017 No. 69)
- The Sale of Tobacco (Registration of Moveable Structures and Fixed Penalty Notices) (Scotland) Amendment Regulations 2017 (S.S.I. 2017 No. 70)
- The National Bus Travel Concession Scheme for Older and Disabled Persons (Scotland) Amendment Order 2017 (S.S.I. 2017 No. 71)
- The Stop and Search Code of Practice (Appointed Day) (Scotland) Regulations 2017 (S.S.I. 2017 No. 72)
- The A90 Trunk Road (Northbound Slip Road from Ferrytoll Roundabout) (Temporary Speed Restriction) Order 2017 (S.S.I. 2017 No. 73)
- The Transport and Works (Scotland) Act 2007 (Applications and Objections Procedure) Amendment Rules 2017 (S.S.I. 2017 No. 74)
- The M9/A9 Trunk Road (Berriedale Braes Improvement) (Trunking) Order 2017 (S.S.I. 2017 No. 75)
- The M9/A9 Trunk Road (Berriedale Braes Improvement) (Side Roads) Order 2017 (S.S.I. 2017 No. 76)
- The Little Loch Broom Scallops Several Fishery Order 2017 (S.S.I. 2017 No. 77)
- The Valuation Appeal Committee (Procedure in Appeals under the Valuation Acts) (Scotland) Amendment Regulations 2017 (S.S.I. 2017 No. 78)
- The Road Traffic (Permitted Parking Area and Special Parking Area) (Angus Council) Designation Order 2017 (S.S.I. 2017 No. 79)
- The Parking Attendants (Wearing of Uniforms) (Angus Council Parking Area) Regulations 2017 (S.S.I. 2017 No. 80)
- The Road Traffic (Parking Adjudicators) (Angus Council) Regulations 2017 (S.S.I. 2017 No. 81)
- The Road Traffic (Permitted Parking Area and Special Parking Area) (Stirling Council) Designation Order 2017 (S.S.I. 2017 No. 82)
- The Parking Attendants (Wearing of Uniforms) (Stirling Council Parking Area) Regulations 2017 (S.S.I. 2017 No. 83)
- The Road Traffic (Parking Adjudicators) (Stirling Council) Regulations 2017 (S.S.I. 2017 No. 84)
- The Non-Domestic Rates (Transitional Relief) (Scotland) Regulations 2017 (S.S.I. 2017 No. 85)
- The Scottish Fiscal Commission (Modification of Functions) Regulations 2017 (S.S.I. 2017 No. 86)
- The Local Government Finance (Scotland) Order 2017 (S.S.I. 2017 No. 87)
- The Judiciary and Courts (Scotland) Act 2008 (Scottish Land Court) Order 2017 (S.S.I. 2017 No. 88)
- The South West Scotland Trunk Roads (Temporary Prohibitions of Traffic and Overtaking and Temporary Speed Restrictions) (No. 3) Order 2017 (S.S.I. 2017 No. 89)
- The South East Scotland Trunk Roads (Temporary Prohibitions of Traffic and Overtaking and Temporary Speed Restrictions) (No. 3) Order 2017 (S.S.I. 2017 No. 90)
- The North West Scotland Trunk Roads (Temporary Prohibitions of Traffic and Overtaking and Temporary Speed Restrictions) (No. 3) Order 2017 (S.S.I. 2017 No. 91)
- The North East Scotland Trunk Roads (Temporary Prohibitions of Traffic and Overtaking and Temporary Speed Restrictions) (No. 3) Order 2017 (S.S.I. 2017 No. 92)
- The Abusive Behaviour and Sexual Harm (Scotland) Act 2016 (Commencement No. 1 and Transitional Provision) Regulations 2017 (S.S.I. 2017 No. 93 (C. 6))
- The Carers (Scotland) Act 2016 (Commencement No. 1) Regulations 2017 (S.S.I. 2017 No. 94 (C. 7))
- The Regulation of Care (Social Service Workers) (Scotland) Amendment Order 2017 (S.S.I. 2017 No. 95)
- The Damages (Personal Injury) (Scotland) Order 2017 (S.S.I. 2017 No. 96)
- The Bankruptcy Fees (Scotland) Revocation Regulations 2017 (S.S.I. 2017 No. 97)
- The Common Agricultural Policy (Direct Payments etc.) (Scotland) Amendment Regulations 2017 (S.S.I. 2017 No. 98)
- The Criminal Justice (Scotland) Act 2016 (Commencement No. 4, Transitional, Transitory and Saving Provisions) Order 2017 (S.S.I. 2017 No. 99 (C. 8))
- The Network Rail (Glasgow Queen Street Station) Order 2017 (S.S.I. 2017 No. 100)

=== 101-200 ===
- The Electricity Works (Environmental Impact Assessment) (Scotland) Regulations 2017 (S.S.I. 2017 No. 101) )
- The Town and Country Planning (Environmental Impact Assessment) (Scotland) Regulations 2017 (S.S.I. 2017 No. 102) )
- Act of Sederunt (Fatal Accident Inquiry Rules) 2017 (S.S.I. 2017 No. 103) )
- The Budget (Scotland) Act 2016 Amendment Regulations 2017 (S.S.I. 2017 No. 104) )
- The Upper Tribunal for Scotland (Transfer of Functions of the Upper Tax Tribunal for Scotland) Regulations 2017 (S.S.I. 2017 No. 105) )
- The First-tier Tribunal for Scotland (Transfer of Functions of the First-tier Tax Tribunal for Scotland) Regulations 2017 (S.S.I. 2017 No. 106) )
- The First-tier Tribunal for Scotland Tax Chamber and Upper Tribunal for Scotland (Composition) Regulations 2017 (S.S.I. 2017 No. 107) )
- The Tribunals (Scotland) Act 2014 (Ancillary Provisions) Regulations 2017 (S.S.I. 2017 No. 108) )
- The Scottish Tribunals (Listed Tribunals) Regulations 2017 (S.S.I. 2017 No. 109) )
- The A9 Trunk Road (McDiarmid Park) (Temporary 30 mph Speed Restriction) Order 2017 (S.S.I. 2017 No. 110) )
- The A86 Trunk Road (Spean Bridge) (Temporary Prohibition of Traffic) Order 2017 (S.S.I. 2017 No. 111)
- The Flood Risk Management (Flood Protection Schemes, Potentially Vulnerable Areas and Local Plan Districts) (Scotland) Amendment Regulations 2017 (S.S.I. 2017 No. 112) )
- The Forestry (Environmental Impact Assessment) (Scotland) Regulations 2017 (S.S.I. 2017 No. 113) )
- The Agriculture, Land Drainage and Irrigation Projects (Environmental Impact Assessment) (Scotland) Regulations 2017 (S.S.I. 2017 No. 114) )
- The Marine Works (Environmental Impact Assessment) (Scotland) Regulations 2017 (S.S.I. 2017 No. 115) )
- The M8, M73, M74 Motorway Improvements (Newhouse) (Temporary Prohibition of Traffic and Overtaking and Temporary Speed Restrictions) Order 2017 (S.S.I. 2017 No. 116)
- The A702 Trunk Road (Ingraston Farm) (Temporary 20 mph and 30 mph Speed Restrictions) Order 2017 (S.S.I. 2017 No. 117)
- The Disabled Persons (Badges for Motor Vehicles) (Scotland) Amendment Regulations 2017 (S.S.I. 2017 No. 118)
- The Air Weapons and Licensing (Scotland) Act 2015 (Commencement No. 6 and Saving Provisions) Order 2017 (S.S.I. 2017 No. 119 (C. 9))
- The Town and Country Planning (Fees for Applications and Deemed Applications) (Scotland) Amendment Regulations 2017 (S.S.I. 2017 No. 120)
- The Carbon Accounting Scheme (Scotland) Amendment Regulations 2017 (S.S.I. 2017 No. 121)
- The North East Scotland Trunk Roads (Temporary Prohibitions of Traffic and Overtaking and Temporary Speed Restrictions) (No. 4) Order 2017 (S.S.I. 2017 No. 122)
- The North West Scotland Trunk Roads (Temporary Prohibitions of Traffic and Overtaking and Temporary Speed Restrictions) (No. 4) Order 2017 (S.S.I. 2017 No. 123)
- The South East Scotland Trunk Roads (Temporary Prohibitions of Traffic and Overtaking and Temporary Speed Restrictions) (No. 4) Order 2017 (S.S.I. 2017 No. 124)
- The South West Scotland Trunk Roads (Temporary Prohibitions of Traffic and Overtaking and Temporary Speed Restrictions) (No. 4) Order 2017 (S.S.I. 2017 No. 125)
- The Mental Health (Scotland) Act 2015 (Commencement No. 3) Order 2017 (S.S.I. 2017 No. 126 (C. 10))
- The Regulation of Scallop Fishing (Scotland) Order 2017 (S.S.I. 2017 No. 127)
- The M9/A90/M90 Trunk Road (Kirkliston to Halbeath) (Variable Speed Limits and Actively Managed Hard Shoulder) Amendment Regulations 2017 (S.S.I. 2017 No. 128)
- The M90/A90 Trunk Road (Admiralty Interchange to Dalmeny) (Variable Speed Limits, Actively Managed Hard Shoulder and Bus Lane) Regulations 2017 (S.S.I. 2017 No. 129)
- Act of Sederunt (Rules of the Court of Session 1994 and Ordinary Cause Rules 1993 Amendment) (Competition Proceedings) 2017 (S.S.I. 2017 No. 130)
- Act of Sederunt (Rules of the Court of Session 1994 Amendment) (Vexatious Actions) 2017 (S.S.I. 2017 No. 131)
- Act of Sederunt (Rules of the Court of Session 1994 and Sheriff Court Rules Amendment) (Curators ad litem) 2017 (S.S.I. 2017 No. 132)
- The Cattle Identification (Scotland) Amendment Regulations 2017 (S.S.I. 2017 No. 133)
- The National Assistance (Assessment of Resources) Amendment (Scotland) Regulations 2017 (S.S.I. 2017 No. 134)
- The National Assistance (Sums for Personal Requirements) (Scotland) Regulations 2017 (S.S.I. 2017 No. 135)
- The Bankruptcy and Protected Trust Deeds (Miscellaneous Amendments) (Scotland) Regulations 2017 (S.S.I. 2017 No. 136)
- The Roads (Scotland) Act 1984 (Environmental Impact Assessment) Regulations 2017 (S.S.I. 2017 No. 137)
- The Transport and Works (Scotland) Act 2007 (Environmental Impact Assessment) Regulations 2017 (S.S.I. 2017 No. 138)
- The Scottish Landfill Tax (Administration) Amendment Regulations 2017 (S.S.I. 2017 No. 139)
- The Human Trafficking and Exploitation (Scotland) Act 2015 (Commencement No. 3 and Transitional Provisions) Regulations 2017 (S.S.I. 2017 No. 140 (C. 11))
- The A83 Trunk Road (Inveraray) (Temporary Prohibition on Use of Road) Order 2017 (S.S.I. 2017 No. 141)
- The A68 Trunk Road (Edinburgh Road, Jedburgh) (Temporary Prohibition on Waiting and 30 mph Speed Restriction) Order 2017 (S.S.I. 2017 No. 142)
- The M8, M73, M74 Motorway Improvements (Shawhead) (Temporary Prohibition of Traffic and Overtaking and Temporary Speed Restrictions) Order 2017 (S.S.I. 2017 No. 143)
- Act of Adjournal (Criminal Procedure Rules 1996 Amendment) (Miscellaneous) 2017 (S.S.I. 2017 No. 144)
- Act of Adjournal (Criminal Procedure Rules 1996 Amendment) (No. 2) (Human Trafficking and Exploitation) 2017 (S.S.I. 2017 No. 145)
- The Academic Awards and Distinctions (University of the Highlands and Islands) (Scotland) Order of Council 2017 (S.S.I. 2017 No. 146)
- The Road Works (Qualifications of Operatives and Supervisors) (Scotland) Regulations 2017 (S.S.I. 2017 No. 147)
- The First-tier Tribunal for Scotland (Oaths) Regulations 2017 (S.S.I. 2017 No. 148)
- The Town and Country Planning (Fees for Applications and Deemed Applications) (Scotland) Amendment (No. 2) Regulations 2017 (S.S.I. 2017 No. 149)
- The A9 Trunk Road (McDiarmid Park) (Temporary 30 mph Speed Restriction) (No. 3) Order 2017 (S.S.I. 2017 No. 150)
- The A82 Trunk Road (Bridge of Orchy to Glencoe) (Temporary Prohibition on Use of Road) Order 2017 (S.S.I. 2017 No. 151)
- The Carers (Scotland) Act 2016 (Commencement No. 2 and Savings Provision) Regulations 2017 (S.S.I. 2017 No. 152 (C. 12))
- Act of Sederunt (Fees of Sheriff Officers) (Amendment) 2017 (S.S.I. 2017 No. 153)
- Act of Sederunt (Sheriff Court Rules Amendment) (Miscellaneous) 2017 (S.S.I. 2017 No. 154)
- The Inquiries into Fatal Accidents and Sudden Deaths etc. (Scotland) Act 2016 (Commencement No. 3, Transitional and Saving Provisions) Regulations 2017 (S.S.I. 2017 No. 155 (C. 13))
- The Inquiries into Fatal Accidents and Sudden Deaths etc. (Scotland) Act 2016 (Consequential Provisions) Regulations 2017 (S.S.I. 2017 No. 156)
- The A702 Trunk Road (Penicuik Rideout) (Temporary Prohibition On Use of Road) Order 2017 (S.S.I. 2017 No. 157)
- The Loch Carron Urgent Marine Conservation Order 2017 (S.S.I. 2017 No. 158)
- The South West Scotland Trunk Roads (Temporary Prohibitions of Traffic and Overtaking and Temporary Speed Restrictions) (No. 5) Order 2017 (S.S.I. 2017 No. 159)
- The South East Scotland Trunk Roads (Temporary Prohibitions of Traffic and Overtaking and Temporary Speed Restrictions) (No. 5) Order 2017 (S.S.I. 2017 No. 160)
- The North West Scotland Trunk Roads (Temporary Prohibitions of Traffic and Overtaking and Temporary Speed Restrictions) (No. 5) Order 2017 (S.S.I. 2017 No. 161)
- The North East Scotland Trunk Roads (Temporary Prohibitions of Traffic and Overtaking and Temporary Speed Restrictions) (No. 5) Order 2017 (S.S.I. 2017 No. 162)
- The M90/A90 Trunk Road (North Water Bridge) (Temporary Prohibition of Specified Turns) Order 2017 (S.S.I. 2017 No. 163)
- The Education (Scotland) Act 2016 (Commencement No. 3) Regulations 2017 (S.S.I. 2017 No. 164 (C. 14))
- The Education Authority Annual Plan Planning Period (Scotland) Regulations 2017 (S.S.I. 2017 No. 165)
- The A96 Trunk Road (Moss Street, Keith) (Temporary Prohibition on Waiting, Loading and Unloading) Order 2017 (S.S.I. 2017 No. 166)
- The M9/A9 Trunk Road (Moulinearn Junction) (Temporary Prohibition of Specified Turns) Order 2017 (S.S.I. 2017 No. 167)
- The Environmental Impact Assessment (Miscellaneous Amendments) (Scotland) Regulations 2017 (S.S.I. 2017 No. 168)
- Act of Sederunt (Sheriff Court Rules Amendment) (European Small Claims Procedure and European Order for Payment Procedure) 2017 (S.S.I. 2017 No. 169)
- The Requirements for Teachers (Scotland) Amendment Regulations 2017 (S.S.I. 2017 No. 170)
- The Police Act 1997 (Criminal Records) (Scotland) Amendment Regulations 2017 (S.S.I. 2017 No. 171)
- The Mental Health Tribunal for Scotland (Practice and Procedure) (No. 2) Amendment Rules 2017 (S.S.I. 2017 No. 172)
- Not Allocated (S.S.I. 2017 No. 173)
- The Mental Health (Conflict of Interest) (Scotland) Regulations 2017 (S.S.I. 2017 No. 174)
- The Mental Health (Patient Representation) (Prescribed Persons) (Scotland) Regulations 2017 (S.S.I. 2017 No. 175)
- The Mental Health (Certificates for Medical Treatment) (Scotland) Regulations 2017 (S.S.I. 2017 No. 176)
- The Marketing of Fruit Plant and Propagating Material (Scotland) Regulations 2017 (S.S.I. 2017 No. 177)
- The Milk and Other Products (Pupils in Educational Establishments) (Scotland) Regulations 2017 (S.S.I. 2017 No. 178)
- The Seed (Fees etc.) (Scotland) Regulations 2017 (S.S.I. 2017 No. 179)
- The Education (Fees and Student Support) (Miscellaneous Amendments) (Scotland) Regulations 2017 (S.S.I. 2017 No. 180)
- The Apologies (Scotland) Act 2016 (Excepted Proceedings) Regulations 2017 (S.S.I. 2017 No. 181)
- The Welfare Reform (Consequential Amendments) (Scotland) Regulations 2017 (S.S.I. 2017 No. 182)
- The Abusive Behaviour and Sexual Harm (Scotland) Act 2016 (Commencement No. 2) Regulations 2017 (S.S.I. 2017 No. 183 (C. 15))
- The A83 Trunk Road (Poltalloch Street, Lochgilphead) (Temporary Prohibition On Use of Road) Order 2017 (S.S.I. 2017 No. 184)
- The A87 Trunk Road (Bridge Road, Portree) (Temporary Prohibition on Use of Road) Order 2017 (S.S.I. 2017 No. 185)
- Act of Sederunt (Rules of the Court of Session, Sheriff Appeal Court Rules and Sheriff Court Rules Amendment) (Lay Representation) 2017 (S.S.I. 2017 No. 186)
- The Town and Country Planning (Fees for Applications and Deemed Applications) (Scotland) Amendment (No. 3) Regulations 2017 (S.S.I. 2017 No. 187)
- The Building (Miscellaneous Amendments) (Scotland) Regulations 2017 (S.S.I. 2017 No. 188)
- The Town and Country Planning (General Permitted Development) (Scotland) Amendment Order 2017 (S.S.I. 2017 No. 189)
- The Public Bodies (Joint Working) (Prescribed Local Authority Functions etc.) (Scotland) Amendment Regulations 2017 (S.S.I. 2017 No. 190)
- The A82 Trunk Road (Glencoe Village) (Temporary Prohibition of Specified Turns and Width Restriction) Order 2017 (S.S.I. 2017 No. 191)
- The Community Empowerment (Scotland) Act 2015 (Commencement No. 8) Order 2017 (S.S.I. 2017 No. 192 (C. 16))
- The Registration of Social Workers and Social Service Workers in Care Services (Scotland) Amendment Regulations 2017 (S.S.I. 2017 No. 193)
- The A977 Trunk Road (Kincardine) (Temporary Prohibition on Waiting, Loading and Unloading) Order 2017 (S.S.I. 2017 No. 194)
- The Port of Ardersier Harbour Revision (Transfer) Order 2017 (S.S.I. 2017 No. 195)
- The Tobermory Harbour Empowerment Order 2017 (S.S.I. 2017 No. 196)
- The Mental Health (Scotland) Act 2015 (Commencement No. 4 and Transitional and Savings Provisions) Order 2017 (S.S.I. 2017 No. 197 (C. 17))
- The M9/A9 Trunk Road (Trinafour Junction) (Temporary Prohibition of Specified Turns) Order 2017 (S.S.I. 2017 No. 198)
- The A82 Trunk Road (Glendoe Road, Fort Augustus) (Temporary Vehicle Width Restriction) Order 2017 (S.S.I. 2017 No. 199)
- Act of Sederunt (Rules of the Court of Session 1994 Amendment) (Withdrawal of Agents and Judicial Review) 2017 (S.S.I. 2017 No. 200)

=== 201-300 ===
- The Lobbying (Scotland) Act 2016 (Commencement No. 1) Regulations 2017 (S.S.I. 2017 No. 201 (C. 18))
- Act of Sederunt (Rules of the Court of Session 1994 and Sheriff Court Rules Amendment) (Regulation (EU) 2015/848) 2017 (S.S.I. 2017 No. 202)
- The A830 and A82 Trunk Road (Fort William to Invergarry) (Temporary Prohibition on Use of Road) Order 2017 (S.S.I. 2017 No. 203)
- The A887 and A82 Trunk Road (Invermoriston to Inverness) (Temporary Prohibition on Use of Road) Order 2017 (S.S.I. 2017 No. 204)
- The Loch Carron Urgent Marine Conservation (No. 2) Order 2017 (S.S.I. 2017 No. 205)
- The A68 Trunk Road (Edinburgh Road, Jedburgh) (Temporary Prohibition on Waiting and 30 mph Speed Restriction) (No. 2) Order 2017 (S.S.I. 2017 No. 206)
- The Carers (Scotland) Act 2016 (Prescribed Days) Regulations 2017 (S.S.I. 2017 No. 207)
- The A830 Trunk Road (Criche Bridge Improvement) (Stopping Up of Accesses) Order 2017 (S.S.I. 2017 No. 208)
- The Public Services Reform (Corporate Insolvency and Bankruptcy) (Scotland) Order 2017 (S.S.I. 2017 No. 209)
- The Insolvency (Regulation (EU) 2015/848) (Miscellaneous Amendments) (Scotland) Regulations 2017 (S.S.I. 2017 No. 210)
- Act of Sederunt (Summary Application Rules 1999 Amendment) (Trafficking and Exploitation Orders) 2017 (S.S.I. 2017 No. 211)
- The A83 Trunk Road (Kinloch Road, Campbeltown) (Temporary Prohibition On Use of Road) Order 2017 (S.S.I. 2017 No. 212)
- The A96 Trunk Road (Pitmachie) (50 mph Speed Limit) Order 2017 (S.S.I. 2017 No. 213)
- The Building (Miscellaneous Amendments) (Scotland) Amendment Regulations 2017 (S.S.I. 2017 No. 214)
- The South West Scotland Trunk Roads (Temporary Prohibitions of Traffic and Overtaking and Temporary Speed Restrictions) (No. 6) Order 2017 (S.S.I. 2017 No. 215)
- The South East Scotland Trunk Roads (Temporary Prohibitions of Traffic and Overtaking and Temporary Speed Restrictions) (No. 6) Order 2017 (S.S.I. 2017 No. 216)
- The North West Scotland Trunk Roads (Temporary Prohibitions of Traffic and Overtaking and Temporary Speed Restrictions) (No. 6) Order 2017 (S.S.I. 2017 No. 217)
- he North East Scotland Trunk Roads (Temporary Prohibitions of Traffic and Overtaking and Temporary Speed Restrictions) (No. 6) Order 2017( S.S.I. 2017 No. 218)
- The A76 Trunk Road (Sanquhar) (Temporary Prohibition on Waiting, Loading and Unloading) Order 2017 (S.S.I. 2017 No. 219)
- The Human Trafficking and Exploitation (Scotland) Act 2015 (Relevant Trafficking or Exploitation Offences and Relevant UK Orders) Regulations 2017 (S.S.I. 2017 No. 220)
- The Criminal Justice (Scotland) Act 2016 (Consequential and Transitional Provisions) Regulations 2017 (S.S.I. 2017 No. 221)
- he A78 Trunk Road (High Street, Greenock) (Temporary Prohibition of Specified Turns) Order 2017 ( S.S.I. 2017 No. 222)
- The A9 Trunk Road (Glassingall, Dunblane) (Temporary Prohibition of Specified Turns) Order 2017 (S.S.I. 2017 No. 223)
- The A90 Trunk Road (Ellon Road) (Redetermination of Means of Exercise of Public Right of Passage) Order 2017 (S.S.I. 2017 No. 224)
- The Energy Performance of Buildings (Scotland) Amendment Regulations 2017 (S.S.I. 2017 No. 225)
- The Prohibited Procedures on Protected Animals (Exemptions) (Scotland) Amendment Regulations 2017 (S.S.I. 2017 No. 226)
- The Universal Credit (Claims and Payments) (Scotland) Regulations 2017 (S.S.I. 2017 No. 227)
- The Criminal Justice and Licensing (Scotland) Act 2010 (Consequential Provisions) Order 2017 (S.S.I. 2017 No. 228)
- The Mental Health (Cross-border transfer: patients subject to detention requirement or otherwise in hospital) (Scotland) Amendment Regulations 2017 (S.S.I. 2017 No. 229)
- The Mental Health (Cross-border Visits) (Scotland) Amendment Regulations 2017 (S.S.I. 2017 No. 230)
- The National Health Service (Free Prescriptions and Charges for Drugs and Appliances) (Scotland) Amendment Regulations 2017 (S.S.I. 2017 No. 231)
- The Mental Health (Cross-border transfer: patients subject to requirements other than detention) (Scotland) Regulations 2017 (S.S.I. 2017 No. 232)
- The Land and Buildings Transaction Tax (Additional Amount-Second Homes Main Residence Relief) (Scotland) Order 2017 (S.S.I. 2017 No. 233)
- The Mental Health (Scotland) Act 2015 (Commencement No. 5 and Transitional Provisions) Order 2017 (S.S.I. 2017 No. 234 (C. 19))
- The A78 Trunk Road (Open Golf Championship, Dundonald) (Temporary 40 mph Speed Restriction) Order 2017 (S.S.I. 2017 No. 235)
- The A83 Trunk Road (Croft Park, Tarbert) (Temporary Prohibition On Use of Road) Order 2017 (S.S.I. 2017 No. 236)
- The A96 Trunk Road (Moss Street, Keith) (Temporary Prohibition on Waiting, Loading and Unloading) (No. 2) Order 2017 (S.S.I. 2017 No. 237)
- The A92 Trunk Road (Freuchie Mill Road, Dundee) (Temporary Prohibition of Specified Turns) Order 2017 (S.S.I. 2017 No. 238)
- The General Teaching Council for Scotland (Legal Assessor) Rules 2017 (S.S.I. 2017 No. 239)
- Act of Sederunt (Messengers-at-Arms and Sheriff Officers Rules) (Amendment) 2017( S.S.I. 2017 No. 240)
- The A82 Trunk Road (Glen Gloy Junction to Letterfinlay Lodge) (50 mph Speed Limit) Order 2017 (S.S.I. 2017 No. 241)
- Act of Sederunt (Rules of the Court of Session 1994 and Summary Application Rules 1999 Amendment) (Miscellaneous) 2017 (S.S.I. 2017 No. 242)
- The A702 Trunk Road (Gas Works Road, Biggar) (Temporary Prohibition On Use of Road) Order 2017 (S.S.I. 2017 No. 243)
- The A85 Trunk Road (Auchraw Terrace, Lochearnhead) (Temporary Prohibition on Use of Road) Order 2017 (S.S.I. 2017 No. 244)
- The A96 Trunk Road (Inverurie Road) (Redetermination of Means of Exercise of Public Right of Passage) Order 2017 (S.S.I. 2017 No. 245)
- The M876/A876 Trunk Road (Kincardine Bridge) (Temporary Prohibition of Specified Turns) Order 2017 (S.S.I. 2017 No. 246)
- The A9 Trunk Road (Scrabster) (Temporary Prohibition on Use of Road) Order 2017 (S.S.I. 2017 No. 247)
- The A85 Trunk Road (Laggan Park to Bridge Street, Comrie) (Temporary Prohibition on Use of Road) Order 2017 (S.S.I. 2017 No. 248)
- The A85 Trunk Road (Strathearn Terrace to Comrie Street, Crieff) (Temporary Prohibition on Use of Road) Order 2017 (S.S.I. 2017 No. 249)
- The A737/A738 Trunk Road (Townend Street, Dalry) (Temporary Prohibition on Use of Road) Order 2017 (S.S.I. 2017 No. 250)
- Act of Adjournal (Criminal Procedure Rules 1996 Amendment) (No. 3) (Miscellaneous) 2017 (S.S.I. 2017 No. 251)
- The South East Scotland Trunk Roads (Temporary Prohibitions of Traffic and Overtaking and Temporary Speed Restrictions) (No. 7) Order 2017 (S.S.I. 2017 No. 252)
- The South West Scotland Trunk Roads (Temporary Prohibitions of Traffic and Overtaking and Temporary Speed Restrictions) (No. 7) Order 2017 (S.S.I. 2017 No. 253)
- The North East Scotland Trunk Roads (Temporary Prohibitions of Traffic and Overtaking and Temporary Speed Restrictions) (No. 7) Order 2017 (S.S.I. 2017 No. 254)
- The North West Scotland Trunk Roads (Temporary Prohibitions of Traffic and Overtaking and Temporary Speed Restrictions) (No. 7) Order 2017 (S.S.I. 2017 No. 255)
- The A83 Trunk Road (Hall Street, Campbeltown) (Temporary Prohibitions of Traffic) Order 2017 (S.S.I. 2017 No. 256)
- The Carers (Scotland) Act 2016 (Agreements of a Specified Kind) Regulations 2017 (S.S.I. 2017 No. 257)
- The A83 Trunk Road (Furnace to Cumlodden) (Temporary 40 mph Speed Restriction) Order 2017 (S.S.I. 2017 No. 258)
- The Registration of Independent Schools (Prescribed Person) (Scotland) Regulations 2017 (S.S.I. 2017 No. 259)
- The A9 Trunk Road (Blackford) (Temporary Prohibition of Specified Turns) Order 2017 (S.S.I. 2017 No. 260)
- The M90/A90 Trunk Road (Myrekirk Roundabout) (Temporary 30 mph Speed Restriction) Order 2017 (S.S.I. 2017 No. 261)*The A85 Trunk Road (Crieff) (Temporary Prohibition On Use of Road) Order 2017 (S.S.I. 2017 No. 262)
- The A702 Trunk Road (Biggar) (20 mph, 30 mph and 40 mph Speed Limits) Order 2017 (S.S.I. 2017 No. 263)
- The A737/A738 Trunk Road (Townend Street, Dalry) (Temporary Prohibition on Use of Road) (No. 2) Order 2017 (S.S.I. 2017 No. 264)
- The A737/A738 Trunk Road (Townend Street, Dalry) (Temporary Prohibition on Waiting, Loading and Unloading) Order 2017 (S.S.I. 2017 No. 265)
- The M90/A90 Trunk Road (Dalmeny to Masterton) (Temporary Prohibitions of Traffic, Pedestrians and Overtaking, Temporary Speed Restrictions and Temporary Bus Lanes) Order 2017 (S.S.I. 2017 No. 266)
- The M90/A90 Trunk Road (Queensferry Crossing) (Temporary Prohibition On Use of Road) Order 2017 (S.S.I. 2017 No. 267)
- The North East Scotland Trunk Roads (Temporary Prohibitions of Traffic and Overtaking and Temporary Speed Restrictions) (No. 8) Order 2017 (S.S.I. 2017 No. 268)
- The North West Scotland Trunk Roads (Temporary Prohibitions of Traffic and Overtaking and Temporary Speed Restrictions) (No. 8) Order 2017 (S.S.I. 2017 No. 269)
- The South East Scotland Trunk Roads (Temporary Prohibitions of Traffic and Overtaking and Temporary Speed Restrictions) (No. 8) Order 2017 (S.S.I. 2017 No. 270)
- The A77 Trunk Road (Bankfield Roundabout) (Temporary 40 mph Speed Restriction) Order 2017 (S.S.I. 2017 No. 271)
- The A78 Trunk Road (Seamill) (Temporary 30 mph Speed Restriction) Order 2017 (S.S.I. 2017 No. 272)
- The Homeless Persons (Unsuitable Accommodation) (Scotland) Amendment Order 2017 (S.S.I. 2017 No. 273)
- The Scottish Tribunals (Eligibility for Appointment) Amendment Regulations 2017 (S.S.I. 2017 No. 274)
- The A9 Trunk Road (McDiarmid Park) (Temporary 30 mph Speed Restriction) (No. 4) Order 2017 (S.S.I. 2017 No. 275)
- The A82 Trunk Road (Innis Na Birlinn) (Temporary 30 mph and 20 mph Speed Restriction and Temporary Prohibition on Use of Road) Order 2017 (S.S.I. 2017 No. 276)
- The A90 Trunk Road (Brechin) (Temporary 50 mph, 30 mph and 20 mph Speed Restriction and Temporary Prohibition on Use of Road) Order 2017 (S.S.I. 2017 No. 277)
- The A9 Trunk Road (Calvine) (Temporary 30 mph and 20 mph Speed Restriction and Temporary Prohibition on Use of Road) Order 2017 (S.S.I. 2017 No. 278)
- The Limitation (Childhood Abuse) (Scotland) Act 2017 (Commencement) Regulations 2017 (S.S.I. 2017 No. 279 (C. 20))
- The Railway Closures (Exclusion) (Scotland) Order 2017 (S.S.I. 2017 No. 280)
- The Public Water Supplies (Scotland) Amendment Regulations 2017 (S.S.I. 2017 No. 281)
- The Water Intended for Human Consumption (Private Supplies) (Scotland) Regulations 2017 (S.S.I. 2017 No. 282)
- The Teachers’ Superannuation and Pension Scheme (Additional Voluntary Contributions) (Scotland) Regulations 2017 (S.S.I. 2017 No. 283)
- The Charities Accounts (Scotland) Amendment Regulations 2017 (S.S.I. 2017 No. 284)
- The Sexual Offences Act 2003 (Prescribed Police Stations) (Scotland) Regulations 2017 (S.S.I. 2017 No. 285)
- The M8/M73/M74 Motorways (30 mph, 40 mph and 50 mph Speed Limit) Regulations 2017 (S.S.I. 2017 No. 286)
- The Natural Mineral Water, Spring Water and Bottled Drinking Water (Scotland) Amendment Regulations 2017 (S.S.I. 2017 No. 287)
- The Individual Learning Account (Scotland) Amendment Regulations 2017 (S.S.I. 2017 No. 288)
- The National Health Service (General Dental Services) (Scotland) Amendment Regulations 2017 (S.S.I. 2017 No. 289)
- The A828 Trunk Road (Kentallen to Ledaig) (Temporary Vehicle Width Restriction) Order 2017 (S.S.I. 2017 No. 290)
- The Advice and Assistance (Proceedings for Recovery of Documents) (Scotland) Regulations 2017 (S.S.I. 2017 No. 291)
- Not Allocated (S.S.I. 2017 No. 292)
- The Private Housing (Tenancies) (Scotland) Act 2016 (Commencement No. 2 and Saving Provision) Regulations 2017 (S.S.I. 2017 No. 293 (C. 21))
- The Health (Tobacco, Nicotine etc. and Care) (Scotland) Act 2016 (Commencement No. 2) Regulations 2017 (S.S.I. 2017 No. 294 (C. 22))
- The Notice to Local Authorities (Scotland) Amendment Regulations 2017 (S.S.I. 2017 No. 295)
- The Private Residential Tenancies (Information for Determining Rents and Fees for Copies of Information) (Scotland) Regulations 2017 (S.S.I. 2017 No. 296)
- The Private Residential Tenancies (Prescribed Notices and Forms) (Scotland) Regulations 2017 (S.S.I. 2017 No. 297)
- Act of Adjournal (Criminal Procedure Rules 1996 Amendment) (No. 4) (Publicity, Remedial and Remediation Orders) 2017 (S.S.I. 2017 No. 298)
- The Land Reform (Scotland) Act 2016 (Commencement No. 6, Transitory and Saving Provisions) Regulations 2017 (S.S.I. 2017 No. 299 (C. 23))
- The Agricultural Holdings (Modern Limited Duration Tenancies and Consequential etc. Provisions) (Scotland) Regulations 2017 (S.S.I. 2017 No. 300)

=== 301-400 ===
- The Title Conditions (Scotland) Act 2003 (Rural Housing Bodies) Amendment (No. 2) Order 2017 (S.S.I. 2017 No. 301)
- The M9/A9 Trunk Road (Birnam and Dunkeld) (Temporary Prohibition of Specified Turns) Order 2017 (S.S.I. 2017 No. 302)
- The A82 Trunk Road (Glencoe) (Temporary Prohibition on Use of Road and Temporary Speed Restriction) Order 2017 (S.S.I. 2017 No. 303)
- The Functions of Health Boards (Scotland) Amendment Order 2017 (S.S.I. 2017 No. 304)
- The A75 Trunk Road (Eastriggs) (Temporary 30 mph and 20 mph Speed Restrictions and Temporary Prohibition on Use of Road) Order 2017 (S.S.I. 2017 No. 305)
- the A75 Trunk Road (Haugh of Urr) (Temporary 30 mph and 20 mph Speed Restrictions and Temporary Prohibition on Use of Road) Order 2017 (S.S.I. 2017 No. 306)
- the A76 Trunk Road (Closeburn) (Temporary 30 mph and 20 mph Speed Restrictions and Temporary Prohibition on Use of Road) Order 2017 (S.S.I. 2017 No. 307)
- The A77 Trunk Road (Bennane) (Temporary 30 mph and 20 mph Speed Restrictions and Temporary Prohibition on Use of Road) Order 2017 (S.S.I. 2017 No. 308)
- The A701 Trunk Road (Amisfield) (Temporary 30 mph and 20 mph Speed Restrictions and Temporary Prohibition on Use of Road) Order 2017 (S.S.I. 2017 No. 309)
- The Civil Legal Aid (Scotland) (Miscellaneous Amendments) Regulations 2017 (S.S.I. 2017 No. 310)
- The South West Scotland Trunk Roads (Temporary Prohibitions of Traffic and Overtaking and Temporary Speed Restrictions) (No. 8) Order 2017 (S.S.I. 2017 No. 311)
- The South East Scotland Trunk Roads (Temporary Prohibitions of Traffic and Overtaking and Temporary Speed Restrictions) (No. 9) Order 2017 (S.S.I. 2017 No. 312)
- The North East Scotland Trunk Roads (Temporary Prohibitions of Traffic and Overtaking and Temporary Speed Restrictions) (No. 9) Order 2017 (S.S.I. 2017 No. 313)
- The North West Scotland Trunk Roads (Temporary Prohibitions of Traffic and Overtaking and Temporary Speed Restrictions) (No. 9) Order 2017 (S.S.I. 2017 No. 314)
- The A828 Trunk Road (Kentallen to Ledaig) (Temporary Vehicle Width Restriction) (No. 2) Order 2017 (S.S.I. 2017 No. 315)
- The A86 Trunk Road (High Street, Kingussie) (Temporary Prohibition on Waiting, Loading and Unloading) Order 2017 (S.S.I. 2017 No. 316)
- The Common Agricultural Policy (Direct Payments etc.) (Scotland) Amendment (No. 2) Regulations 2017 (S.S.I. 2017 No. 317)
- The A9 Trunk Road (Ardullie to Evanton) (Temporary Prohibition of Specified Turns) Order 2017 (S.S.I. 2017 No. 318)
- The A96 Trunk Road (Craibstone Junction Link Road) (40 mph Speed Limit) Order 2017 (S.S.I. 2017 No. 319)
- The A96 Trunk Road (Inverurie Road) (40 mph and 50 mph Speed Limits) Order 2017 (S.S.I. 2017 No. 320)
- The Public and Private Water Supplies (Miscellaneous Amendments) (Scotland) Regulations 2017 (S.S.I. 2017 No. 321)
- The Pollution Prevention and Control (Designation of Medium Combustion Plant Directive) (Scotland) Order 2017 (revoked) (S.S.I. 2017 No. 322)
- The Sea Fishing (Miscellaneous Revocations) (Scotland) Regulations 2017 (S.S.I. 2017 No. 323)
- The Sea Fishing (Miscellaneous Revocations) (Scotland) Order 2017 (S.S.I. 2017 No. 324)
- The Prohibition of Fishing with Multiple Trawls (Scotland) Order 2017 (S.S.I. 2017 No. 325)
- The Council Tax Reduction (Scotland) Amendment (No. 2) Regulations 2017 (S.S.I. 2017 No. 326)
- The A725 and A7071 Trunk Roads (Raith) (Trunking) Order 2017 (S.S.I. 2017 No. 327)
- The First-tier Tribunal for Scotland Housing and Property Chamber (Procedure) Regulations 2017 (S.S.I. 2017 No. 328)
- The Housing (Scotland) Act 2014 (Consequential Provisions) Order 2017 (S.S.I. 2017 No. 329)
- The Housing (Scotland) Act 2014 (Commencement No. 7, Amendment and Saving Provision) Order 2017 (S.S.I. 2017 No. 330 (C. 24))
- The A737 Dalry Bypass (Temporary Prohibitions of Traffic and Overtaking, Temporary 40 mph Speed Restriction, Temporary Prohibition of Waiting, Loading and Unloading) Order 2017 (S.S.I. 2017 No. 331)
- Act of Sederunt (Civil Legal Aid Rules Amendment) 2017 (S.S.I. 2017 No. 332)
- The A9 Trunk Road (Scrabster) (Temporary Prohibition On Use of Road) (No. 2) Order 2017 (S.S.I. 2017 No. 333)
- The A87 Trunk Road (Dunvegan Road, Portree) (Temporary Prohibition of Specified Turns) Order 2017 (S.S.I. 2017 No. 334)
- The M9/A9 Trunk Road (Birnam and Dunkeld) (Temporary Prohibition of Specified Turns) (No. 2) Order 2017 (S.S.I. 2017 No. 335)
- The A83 Trunk Road (Ardrishaig) (Temporary Prohibition On Use of Road) Order 2017 (S.S.I. 2017 No. 336)
- The A84 Trunk Road (Doune) (Temporary Prohibition On Use of Road) Order 2017 (S.S.I. 2017 No. 337)
- The A85 Trunk Road (Crieff) (Temporary Prohibition On Use of Road) (No. 2) Order 2017 (S.S.I. 2017 No. 338)
- The M8 (Newhouse to Easterhouse) M73 (Maryville to Mollinsburn) M74 (Daldowie to Hamilton) A8 (Newhouse to Bargeddie) A725 (Shawhead to Whistleberry) A7071 (Bellshill) Trunk Roads (Temporary Prohibitions of Traffic and Overtaking and Temporary Speed Restrictions) Order 2017 (S.S.I. 2017 No. 339)
- The A83 Trunk Road (Kinloch Road, Campbeltown) (Temporary Prohibition On Use of Road) (No. 2) Order 2017 (S.S.I. 2017 No. 340)
- The A83 Trunk Road (Poltalloch Street and Lochnell Street, Lochgilphead) (Temporary Prohibition On Use of Road) Order 2017 (S.S.I. 2017 No. 341)
- The Road Traffic (Permitted Parking Area and Special Parking Area) (North Lanarkshire Council) Designation Order 2017 (S.S.I. 2017 No. 342)
- The Parking Attendants (Wearing of Uniforms) (North Lanarkshire Council Parking Area) Regulations 2017 (S.S.I. 2017 No. 343)
- The Road Traffic (Parking Adjudicators) (North Lanarkshire Council) Regulations 2017 (S.S.I. 2017 No. 344)
- The Criminal Justice (Scotland) Act 2016 (Commencement No. 5, Transitional and Saving Provisions) Order 2017 (S.S.I. 2017 No. 345 (C. 25))
- The Private Housing (Tenancies) (Scotland) Act 2016 (Commencement No. 3, Amendment, Saving Provision and Revocation) Regulations 2017 (S.S.I. 2017 No. 346 (C. 26))
- The Development of Water Resources (Designated Bodies: Modification) (Scotland) Regulations 2017 (S.S.I. 2017 No. 347)
- The Water and Sewerage Services to Dwellings (Collection of Unmetered Charges by Local Authority) (Scotland) Amendment Order 2017 (S.S.I. 2017 No. 348)
- The Rent Regulation and Assured Tenancies (Forms) (Scotland) Regulations 2017 (S.S.I. 2017 No. 349)
- The Town and Country Planning (Fees for Monitoring Surface Coal Mining Sites) (Scotland) Regulations 2017 (S.S.I. 2017 No. 350)
- The A68 Trunk Road (Lauder) (Temporary Prohibition On Use of Road) Order 2017 (S.S.I. 2017 No. 351)
- The Education (Scotland) Act 2016 (Commencement No. 3) Amendment Regulations 2017 (S.S.I. 2017 No. 352 (C. 27))
- The Section 70 (Procedure) (Scotland) Regulations 2017 (S.S.I. 2017 No. 353)
- The Education (Scotland) Act 2016 (Commencement No. 4) Regulations 2017 (S.S.I. 2017 No. 354 (C. 28))
- The Additional Support for Learning (Collection of Data) (Scotland) Regulations 2017 (S.S.I. 2017 No. 355)
- The Additional Support for Learning Dispute Resolution (Scotland) Amendment Regulations 2017 (S.S.I. 2017 No. 356)
- The Council Tax Reduction (Scotland) Amendment (No. 2) Amendment Regulations 2017 (S.S.I. 2017 No. 357)
- The A83 Trunk Road (Lochgilphead) (Temporary Prohibition On Use of Road) Order 2017 (S.S.I. 2017 No. 358)
- The A83 Trunk Road (Inveraray) (Temporary Prohibition On Use of Road) Order 2017 (S.S.I. 2017 No. 359)
- The A82 Trunk Road (Tarbet to Inverarnan) (50 mph Speed Limit) Order 2017 (S.S.I. 2017 No. 360)
- The North West Scotland Trunk Roads (Temporary Prohibitions of Traffic and Overtaking and Temporary Speed Restrictions) (No. 10) Order 2017 (S.S.I. 2017 No. 361)
- The South West Scotland Trunk Roads (Temporary Prohibitions of Traffic and Overtaking and Temporary Speed Restrictions) (No. 9) Order 2017 (S.S.I. 2017 No. 362)
- The South East Scotland Trunk Roads (Temporary Prohibitions of Traffic and Overtaking and Temporary Speed Restrictions) (No. 10) Order 2017 (S.S.I. 2017 No. 363)
- The First-tier Tribunal for Scotland General Regulatory Chamber Charity Appeals (Procedure) Regulations 2017 (S.S.I. 2017 No. 364)
- The North East Scotland Trunk Roads (Temporary Prohibitions of Traffic and Overtaking and Temporary Speed Restrictions) (No. 10) Order 2017 (S.S.I. 2017 No. 365)
- The First-tier Tribunal for Scotland Health and Education Chamber (Procedure) Regulations 2017 (S.S.I. 2017 No. 366)
- The Pensions Appeal Tribunals (Scotland) (Amendment) Rules 2017 (S.S.I. 2017 No. 367)
- The M90/A90 Trunk Road (Lonmay) (40 mph Speed Limit) Order 2017 (S.S.I. 2017 No. 368)
- The First-tier Tribunal for Scotland Housing and Property Chamber (Rules of Procedure) Amendment Regulations 2017 (S.S.I. 2017 No. 369)
- The Land Reform (Scotland) Act 2016 (Commencement No. 6, Transitory and Saving Provisions) (Modern Limited Duration Tenancies) Miscellaneous Amendments Regulations 2017 (S.S.I. 2017 No. 370)
- The A83 Trunk Road (Arrochar) (Temporary Prohibition On Use of Road) Order 2017 (S.S.I. 2017 No. 371)
- The A702 Trunk Road (Biggar) (Temporary Prohibition on Use of Road) Order 2017 (S.S.I. 2017 No. 372)
- The A68 Trunk Road (Cranstoun Church) (Temporary Prohibition On Use of Road) Order 2017 (S.S.I. 2017 No. 373)
- The A82 Trunk Road (Kenneth Street, Inverness) (Temporary Prohibition on Waiting, Loading and Unloading) Order 2017 (S.S.I. 2017 No. 374)
- The A84 Trunk Road (Callander) (Temporary Prohibition On Use of Road) Order 2017 (S.S.I. 2017 No. 375)
- The Lobbying (Scotland) Act 2016 (Reporting Procedures) Resolution 2017 (S.S.I. 2017 No. 376)
- The A78 Trunk Road (Inverkip) (Temporary Prohibition on Use of Road) (No. 2) Order 2017 (S.S.I. 2017 No. 377)
- The A84/A85 Trunk Road (Lochearnhead) (Temporary Prohibition On Use of Road) Order 2017 (S.S.I. 2017 No. 378)
- The A96 Trunk Road (Church Road, Keith) (Temporary Prohibition on Use of Road) Order 2017 (S.S.I. 2017 No. 379)
- The M90/A90 Trunk Road (Finavon Junction) (Temporary Prohibition of Specified Turns) Order 2017 (S.S.I. 2017 No. 380)
- The Public Bodies (Joint Working) (Prescribed Health Board Functions) (Scotland) Amendment Regulations 2017 (S.S.I. 2017 No. 381)
- The A82 Trunk Road (Ardachy) (Temporary Vehicle Width Restriction) Order 2017 (S.S.I. 2017 No. 382)
- The A87 Trunk Road (Balmacara) (Temporary Prohibition On Use of Road) Order 2017 (S.S.I. 2017 No. 383)
- The Seed (Miscellaneous Amendments) (Scotland) Regulations 2017 (S.S.I. 2017 No. 384)
- The M9/A9 Trunk Road (Thurso Remembrance Parade) (Temporary Prohibition on Use of Road) Order 2017 (S.S.I. 2017 No. 385)
- Act of Sederunt (Summary Applications, Statutory Applications and Appeals etc. Rules Amendment) (Illegal Working Orders) 2017 (S.S.I. 2017 No. 386)
- The Police Pension Scheme (Scotland) Amendment Regulations 2017 (S.S.I. 2017 No. 387)
- The A85 Trunk Road (Oban) (Temporary Prohibition On Use of Road) Order 2017 (S.S.I. 2017 No. 388)
- The Water Environment (Miscellaneous) (Scotland) Regulations 2017 (S.S.I. 2017 No. 389)
- The A87 Trunk Road (Dunvegan Road, Portree) (Temporary Prohibition of Specified Turns) (No. 2) Order 2017 (S.S.I. 2017 No. 390)
- The A9 Trunk Road (Gower Street, Brora) (Temporary Prohibition on Use of Road) Order 2017 (S.S.I. 2017 No. 391)
- The A9 Trunk Road (Seaforth Road, Golspie) (Temporary Prohibition on Use of Road) Order 2017 (S.S.I. 2017 No. 392)
- The Prisons and Young Offenders Institutions (Scotland) Amendment Rules 2017 (S.S.I. 2017 No. 393)
- The A8 Trunk Road (Easterhouse Junction to Eurocentral Junction Roundabout) (30 mph and 40 mph Speed Limit) Order 2017 (S.S.I. 2017 No. 394)
- The A725 and A7071 connecting Trunk Roads (Raith Roundabout to Shawhead) (40 mph and 50 mph Speed Limit) Order 2017 (S.S.I. 2017 No. 395)
- The A83 Trunk Road (Inveraray) (Temporary Prohibition On Use of Road) Order 2017 (S.S.I. 2017 No. 396)
- The Legal Aid (Scotland) Act 1986 Amendment Regulations 2017 (S.S.I. 2017 No. 397)
- The First-tier Tribunal for Scotland Health and Education Chamber and General Regulatory Chamber Charity Appeals (Procedure) (Miscellaneous Amendments) Regulations 2017 (S.S.I. 2017 No. 398)
- The Budget (Scotland) Act 2017 Amendment Regulations 2017 (S.S.I. 2017 No. 399)
- The Land Reform (Scotland) Act 2016 (Supplemental Provision) Regulations 2017 (S.S.I. 2017 No. 400)

=== 401-466 ===
- The Public Appointments and Public Bodies etc. (Scotland) Act 2003 (Amendment of Specified Authorities) Order 2017 (S.S.I. 2017 No. 401)
- The Alcohol (Minimum Pricing) (Scotland) Act 2012 (Commencement) Order 2017 (S.S.I. 2017 No. 402 (C. 29))
- The Equality Act 2010 (Commencement No. 13) (Scotland) Order 2017 (S.S.I. 2017 No. 403 (C. 30))
- The A90/A9000 Trunk Roads (Forth Road Bridge, and Queensferry Crossing and Forth Road Bridge Approach Roads) (Temporary Prohibitions on Use and Stopping, Bus Lane and Speed Restrictions) Order 2017 (S.S.I. 2017 No. 404)
- The Private Housing (Tenancies) (Scotland) Act 2016 (Consequential Provisions) Regulations 2017 (S.S.I. 2017 No. 405)
- The M9/A9 Trunk Road (Thurso) (Temporary Prohibition On Use of Road) Order 2017 (S.S.I. 2017 No. 406)
- The Private Residential Tenancies (Information for Tenants) (Scotland) Regulations 2017 (S.S.I. 2017 No. 407)
- The Private Residential Tenancies (Statutory Terms) (Scotland) Regulations 2017 (S.S.I. 2017 No. 408)
- The South West Scotland Trunk Roads (Temporary Prohibitions of Traffic and Overtaking and Temporary Speed Restrictions) (No. 10) Order 2017 (S.S.I. 2017 No. 409)
- The South East Scotland Trunk Roads (Temporary Prohibitions of Traffic and Overtaking and Temporary Speed Restrictions) (No. 11) Order 2017 (S.S.I. 2017 No. 410)
- The North West Scotland Trunk Roads (Temporary Prohibitions of Traffic and Overtaking and Temporary Speed Restrictions) (No. 11) Order 2017 (S.S.I. 2017 No. 411)
- The North East Scotland Trunk Roads (Temporary Prohibitions of Traffic and Overtaking and Temporary Speed Restrictions) (No. 11) Order 2017 (S.S.I. 2017 No. 412)
- The A77 Trunk Road (Girvan) (Temporary Prohibition On Use of Road) Order 2017 (S.S.I. 2017 No. 413)
- Act of Sederunt (Rules of the Court of Session 1994 Amendment) (Sittings of the Court) 2017 (S.S.I. 2017 No. 414)
- The Novel Foods (Scotland) Regulations 2017 (S.S.I. 2017 No. 415)
- The Land Reform (Scotland) Act 2016 (Supplementary, Consequential, Transitory and Saving Provisions) Regulations 2017 (S.S.I. 2017 No. 416)
- The A76 Trunk Road (Glasgow Road, Sanquhar) (Temporary Prohibition on Waiting, Loading and Unloading) Order 2017 (S.S.I. 2017 No. 417)
- The A84/A85 Trunk Road (Main Street, Callander) (Temporary Prohibition On Use of Road) Order 2017 (S.S.I. 2017 No. 418)
- The Razor Clams (Prohibition on Fishing and Landing) (Scotland) Order 2017 (S.S.I. 2017 No. 419)
- The Community Empowerment (Scotland) Act 2015 (Commencement No. 9) Order 2017 (S.S.I. 2017 No. 420 (C. 31))
- The Notice to Local Authorities (Scotland) Amendment (No. 2) Regulations 2017 (S.S.I. 2017 No. 421)
- The Sale of Nicotine Vapour Products (Vending Machines) (Scotland) Regulations 2017 (S.S.I. 2017 No. 422)
- The Telecommunications Restriction Orders (Custodial Institutions) (Scotland) Regulations 2017 (S.S.I. 2017 No. 423)
- The Air Weapons and Licensing (Scotland) Act 2015 (Commencement No. 7) Order 2017 (S.S.I. 2017 No. 424 (C. 32))
- The A77 Trunk Road (Maybole) (Temporary Prohibition on Waiting, Loading and Unloading) Order 2017 (S.S.I. 2017 No. 425)
- The Lands Tribunal for Scotland Amendment (Fees) Rules 2017 (S.S.I. 2017 No. 426)
- The Lands Tribunal for Scotland Amendment Rules 2017 (S.S.I. 2017 No. 427)
- The Letting Agent (Registration and Code of Practice) (Scotland) (Miscellaneous Amendments) Regulations 2017 (S.S.I. 2017 No. 428)
- Act of Adjournal (Criminal Procedure Rules 1996 Amendment) (No. 5) (Proceeds of Crime etc.) 2017 (S.S.I. 2017 No. 429)
- The Fife Council Area and Perth and Kinross Council Area (Keltybridge and Fife Environmental Energy Park at Westfield) Boundaries Amendment Order 2017 (S.S.I. 2017 No. 430)
- The International Organisations (Immunities and Privileges) (Scotland) Amendment Order 2017 (S.S.I. 2017 No. 431)
- The Renewables Obligation (Scotland) Amendment Order 2017 (S.S.I. 2017 No. 432)
- The National Health Service Pension Scheme (Scotland) (Miscellaneous Amendments) (No. 2) Regulations 2017 (S.S.I. 2017 No. 433)
- The National Health Service Superannuation Scheme (Scotland) (Miscellaneous Amendments) (No. 2) Regulations 2017 (S.S.I. 2017 No. 434)
- The Firefighters’ Pension Scheme (Amendment and Transitional Provision) (Scotland) Regulations 2017 (S.S.I. 2017 No. 435)
- The Universal Credit (Claims and Payments) (Scotland) Amendment Regulations 2017 (S.S.I. 2017 No. 436)
- The A702 Trunk Road (High Street, Biggar) (Temporary Prohibition On Use of Road) Order 2017 (S.S.I. 2017 No. 437)
- The A85 Trunk Road (Comrie) (Temporary Prohibition On Use of Road) Order 2017 (S.S.I. 2017 No. 438)
- The M90/A90 Trunk Road (St. Madoes to Perth) (Redetermination of Means of Exercise of Public Right of Passage) Order 2017 (S.S.I. 2017 No. 439)
- The A99 Trunk Road (Bruan Church) (Stopping Up) Order 2017 (S.S.I. 2017 No. 440)
- The South West Scotland Trunk Roads (Temporary Prohibitions of Traffic and Overtaking and Temporary Speed Restrictions) (No. 11) Order 2017 (S.S.I. 2017 No. 441)
- The South East Scotland Trunk Roads (Temporary Prohibitions of Traffic and Overtaking and Temporary Speed Restrictions) (No. 12) Order 2017 (S.S.I. 2017 No. 442)
- The North West Scotland Trunk Roads (Temporary Prohibitions of Traffic and Overtaking and Temporary Speed Restrictions) (No. 12) Order 2017 (S.S.I. 2017 No. 443)
- The North East Scotland Trunk Roads (Temporary Prohibitions of Traffic and Overtaking and Temporary Speed Restrictions) (No. 12) Order 2017 (S.S.I. 2017 No. 444)
- The Criminal Justice and Licensing (Scotland) Act 2010 (Commencement No. 14 and Saving Provision) Order 2017 (S.S.I. 2017 No. 445 (C. 33))
- The Pollution Prevention and Control (Scotland) Amendment Regulations 2017 (S.S.I. 2017 No. 446)
- The International Organisations (Immunities and Privileges) (Scotland) Amendment (No. 2) Order 2017 (S.S.I. 2017 No. 447)
- The Fishing Vessels and Fish Farming (Miscellaneous Revocations) (Scotland) Scheme 2017 (S.S.I. 2017 No. 448)
- The Public Bodies (Joint Working) (Prescribed Local Authority Functions etc.) (Scotland) Amendment (No. 2) Regulations 2017 (S.S.I. 2017 No. 449)
- The Sea Fish (Prohibited Methods of Fishing) (Firth of Clyde) Order 2017 (S.S.I. 2017 No. 450)
- The Electricity Works (Environmental Impact Assessment) (Scotland) Amendment Regulations 2017 (S.S.I. 2017 No. 451)
- The Criminal Justice (Scotland) Act 2016 (Consequential and Supplementary Modifications) Regulations 2017 (S.S.I. 2017 No. 452)
- The Criminal Justice (Scotland) Act 2016 (Modification of Part 1 and Ancillary Provision) Regulations 2017 (S.S.I. 2017 No. 453)
- The Teachers’ Pension Scheme (Scotland) (No. 2) Amendment Regulations 2017 (S.S.I. 2017 No. 454)
- The Specified Crustaceans (Prohibition on Landing, Sale and Carriage) (Scotland) Order 2017 (S.S.I. 2017 No. 455)
- The Criminal Finances Act 2017 (Commencement) (Scotland) Regulations 2017 (S.S.I. 2017 No. 456 (C. 34))
- The Allotments (Compensation) (Scotland) Regulations 2017 (S.S.I. 2017 No. 457)
- The Community Empowerment (Scotland) Act 2015 (Commencement No. 10, Saving, Transitional and Transitory Provisions) Order 2017 (S.S.I. 2017 No. 458 (C. 35))
- Act of Sederunt (Summary Applications, Statutory Applications and Appeals etc. Rules Amendment) (Transfer from Lands Tribunal for Scotland) 2017 (S.S.I. 2017 No. 459)
- Act of Sederunt (Summary Applications, Statutory Applications and Appeals etc. Rules Amendment) (Drug Dealing Telecommunications Restriction Orders) 2017 (S.S.I. 2017 No. 460)
- The Forced Marriage etc. (Protection and Jurisdiction) (Scotland) Act 2011 (Relevant Third Party) Order 2017 (S.S.I. 2017 No. 461)
- The M90/A90 Trunk Road (Queensferry Crossing and Approach Roads) (Temporary Prohibitions of Traffic and Overtaking and Temporary Speed Restrictions) Order 2017 (S.S.I. 2017 No. 462)
- The M90/A90 Trunk Road (Queensferry Crossing and Approach Roads) (Temporary Prohibitions of Traffic and Pedestrians and Temporary Speed Restrictions) Order 2017 (S.S.I. 2017 No. 463)
- The A83 Trunk Road (Campbeltown) (Temporary Prohibition on Use of Road, Waiting, Loading and Unloading) Order 2017 (S.S.I. 2017 No. 464)
- The Police Investigations and Review Commissioner (Application and Modification of the Criminal Justice (Scotland) Act 2016) Order 2017 (S.S.I. 2017 No. 465)
- The Criminal Legal Assistance (Miscellaneous Amendments) (Scotland) Regulations 2017 (S.S.I. 2017 No. 466)
