= Nurses, Midwives and Health Visitors Act 1997 =

Act of the Parliament of the United Kingdom

Nurses, Midwives and Health Visitors Act 1997 (Note: Section 24(1).)
- Act of Parliament
- Parliament of the United Kingdom
- Long title: An Act to consolidate the Nurses, Midwives and Health Visitors Act 1979 and the enactments amending it.
- Citation: 1997 c. 24
- Territorial extent: United Kingdom (Note: Section 24(6).)

Dates
- Royal assent: 19 March 1997
- Commencement: 19 June 1997 (Note: Section 24(2).)
- Repealed: 1 August 2004 (Note: The Health Act 1999 (Commencement No. 15) Order 2004 (SI 2004/1859). Earlier provisions were repealed on 11 May 2001 by the Health Act 1999 (Commencement No. 11) Order 2001 (SI 2001/1985) and on 1 April 2002 by the Health Act 1999 (Commencement No. 12) Order 2002 (SI 2002/1167).)

Other legislation
- Amends: See § Repealed enactments
- Repeals/revokes: See § Repealed enactments
- Repealed by: Health Act 1999

Status: Repealed

Text of statute as originally enacted

Revised text of statute as amended

The Nurses, Midwives and Health Visitors Act 1997 (c. 24) was an act of the Parliament of the United Kingdom that consolidated enactments related to the regulation of nurses, midwives and health visitors in the United Kingdom.

== Provisions ==
=== Repealed enactments ===
Section 23(3) of the act repealed 5 enactments and revoked 3 instruments, listed in schedule 6 to the act.

Enactments and instruments repealed or revoked by section 23(3)
| Citation | Short title or title | Extent of repeal or revocation |
|---|---|---|
| 1979 c. 36 | Nurses, Midwives and Health Visitors Act 1979 | The whole Act so far as unrepealed except sections 23(4) and 24 and Schedule 7. |
| SI 1983/884 | Nursing and Midwifery Qualifications (EEC Recognition) Order 1983 | The whole instrument. |
| SI 1984/1975 | Nursing and Midwifery Qualifications (EEC Recognition) Amendment Order 1984 | The whole instrument. |
| 1985 c. 9 | Companies Consolidation (Consequential Provisions) Act 1985 | In Schedule 2, the entry relating to the Nurses, Midwives and Health Visitors Act 1979. |
| 1990 c. 41 | Courts and Legal Services Act 1990 | In Schedule 10, paragraph 43. |
| 1992 c. 16 | Nurses, Midwives and Health Visitors Act 1992 | The whole act. |
| 1995 c. 17 | Health Authorities Act 1995 | In Schedule 1, paragraph 104. |
| SI 1996/3101 | Nurses, Midwives and Health Visitors Act 1979 (Amendment) Regulations 1996 | The whole instrument. |

== Subsequent developments ==
The whole act was repealed by section 60(3) of, and schedule 5 to, the Health Act 1999, in stages. Certain provisions were repealed on 11 May 2001 by virtue of the Health Act 1999 (Commencement No. 11) Order 2001 (SI 2001/1985). Further provisions were repealed on 1 April 2002 by virtue of the Health Act 1999 (Commencement No. 12) Order 2002 (SI 2002/1167). The remaining provisions were repealed on 1 August 2004 by virtue of the Health Act 1999 (Commencement No. 15) Order 2004 (SI 2004/1859), completing the repeal of the act in consequence of the coming into force of the Nursing and Midwifery Order 2001.
