= CDM =

CDM may refer to:

== Arts and media ==
- Celebrity Deathmatch, a TV series
- CD maxi, a music release format

== Organizations ==
- College of Dental Medicine, US dental schools
- DePaul University College of Computing and Digital Media, in Chicago, Illinois, US
- Corona del Mar High School, a high school in Newport Beach, California, US

== Science and technology ==
=== Computing ===
- Combining Diacritical Marks, for keyboards
- Common Diagnostic Model, an information technology standard of the Distributed Management Task Force
- Conceptual data model, in database design
- Content Decryption Module, used in digital rights management
- Customer data management, software and behaviors for businesses to handle customer data
- Continuous Diagnostics and Mitigation, a program of the Department of Homeland Security; see Federal Systems Integration and Management Center

=== Other uses in science and technology ===
- Cash deposit machine, in banks
- Clean Development Mechanism, a mechanism in the Kyoto Protocol for reducing emissions
- Ceramic metal-halide lamp, a light source
- Charged-device model, used in electrostatic discharge testing
- Clinical data management, in medical research
- Code division multiplexing, in radio communications
- Cold dark matter, a theory in physics
- Combustion detection module, in Saab automobiles
- Congenital dermal melanocytosis, a benign birthmark

== Other uses ==
- Charge description master, a comprehensive price list of items billable to patients in a US hospital
- Chidambaram railway station, Cuddalore, Tamil Nadu, India (Indian Railways station code CDM)
- Construction (Design and Management)
  - Construction (Design and Management) Regulations 2007, UK construction regulations
  - Construction (Design and Management) Regulations 2015, UK construction regulations
- Corona del Mar, Newport Beach, a beach and community in California, US
- Clergy Discipline Measure 2003, a legal measure in the Church of England
- Central defensive midfielder, a position in association football
- Christian electronic dance music, also known as CDM

== See also ==
- Lambda-CDM model or ΛCDM model, standard cosmological model of the universe
