= Town and Country Planning (Use Classes) Order 1950 =

- Statutory Instrument
- Parliament of the United Kingdom
- Citation: SI 1950/1131
- Territorial extent: England and Wales

Dates
- Made: 11 July 1950
- Commencement: 21 July 1950

Other legislation
- Repeals/revokes: Town and Country Planning (Use Classes) Order 1948
- Made under: Town and Country Planning Act 1947
- Amended by: Town and Country Planning (Use Classes) (Amendment) Order 1960; Town and Country Planning (Use Classes) (Amendment No. 2) Order 1960
- Revoked by: Town and Country Planning (Use Classes) Order 1963

Status: Repealed

Text of statute as originally enacted

The Town and Country Planning (Use Classes) Order 1950 (SI 1950/1131) is a statutory instrument, applying in England and Wales.

== Background ==
The concept of statutory use classes was introduced by the Town and Country Planning Act 1947. So they could be easily updated from time to time, the classes were set out in secondary legislation. The Town and Country Planning (Use Classes) Order 1948 was the first such order. The Town and Country Planning (Use Classes) Order 1950 revoked and replaced it.

The purpose of the use classes, at least initially, was to determine if planning permission was necessary and if a development charge was payable. The development charge was a tax on the value of the betterment of the land. Development charges were withdrawn on 18 November 1952.

== Provisions ==
The 1950 order reduced the number of use classes from twenty-two to eighteen, to make possible more changes of use within a class, eliminating the need to pay a development charge.

== Amendments ==
It was amended by the Town and Country Planning (Use Classes) (Amendment) Order 1960 and the Town and Country Planning (Use Classes) (Amendment No. 2) Order 1960.

It was replaced by the Town and Country Planning (Use Classes) Order 1963.

== Use classes ==
There were eighteen use classes from 1950, reduced from twenty-two in 1948.

Class	Description
I	Shop (Note: Defined as a building used for the carrying on of any retail trade or retail business wherein the primary purpose is the selling of goods by retail, and includes a building used for the purposes of a hairdresser, undertaker or ticket agency or for the reception of goods to be washed, cleaned or repaired, or for any other purpose appropriate to a shopping area, but does not include a building used as a funfair (including an amusement arcade or pin-table saloon), garage, petrol filling station, office, or hotel or premises (other than a restaurant) licensed for the sale of intoxicating liquors for consumption on the premises.) for any purpose except as: (i) fried fish shop; (ii) tripe shop; (iii) shop for the sale of pet animals or birds; (iv) cats-meat shop
II	Office, including a bank, but not a post office
III	Light industrial (Note: Defined as an industrial building (that is not a special industrial building) in which the processes carried on or the machinry installed are such as could be carried on or installed in any residential area without detriment to the amenity of that area by reason of noise, vibration, smell, fumes, smoke, soot, ash, dust or grit.)
IV	General industrial (Note: Defined as an industrial building other than a light industrial building or a special industrial building.)
V	Alkali, &c. Works Regulation Act 1906 registerable activity, except ancillary processes Any of the following that are not registerable: (i) smelting, calcining, sintering or other reduction of ores or minerals; (ii) converting, re-heating, annealing, hardening or carburising, forging or casting, of iron or other metals; (iii) galvanising; (iv) recovering of metal from scrap; (v) pickling or treatment of metal in acid; (vi) chromium, plating
Special industrial group A
VI	Any of the following (that are not in Class V): (i) burning of building bricks; (ii) lime and dolomite burning; (iii) carbonisation of coal in coke ovens; (iv) production of calcium carbide, lampblack or zinc oxide; (v) crushing or screening of stone or slag
Special industrial group B
VII	Any of the following (that are not in Class V): The production or employment of; (i) cyanogen or its compounds; (ii) quid or gaseous sulphur dioxide; (iii) sulphur chlorides; Salt glazing; Sintering of sulphur bearing materials; The manufacture of glass, where the sodium sulphate used exceeds 1.5% of the total weight of the melt; The production of ultramarine or zinc chloride
Special industrial group C
VIII	Any of the following (that are not in Class V): The distilling, refining or blending of oils, the production or employment of cellulose lacquers (except their employment in garages in connection with minor repairs), hot pitch or bitumen, or pyridine; the stoving of enamelled ware; the production of amyl acetate, aromatic esters, butyric acid, caramel, hexamine, iodoform, B-naphthol, resin products (except synthetic resins, plastic moulding or extrusion. compositions and plastic sheets, rods, tubes, filaments, fibres or optical components produced by casting, calendering, moulding, shaping or extrusion), salicylic acid, or sulphonated organic com- pounds; paint and varnish manufacture (excluding mixing, milling and grinding); the production of rubber from scrap; or the manufacture of acetylene from calcium carbide, for sale or for use in a further chemical process
Special industrial group D
IX	Any of the following (that are not in Class V): Animal charcoal manufacturer; Blood albumen maker; Blood boiler; Bone boiler or steamer; Bone burner; Bone grinder; Breeder of maggots from putrescible animal matter; Candle maker; Catgut manufacturer; Chitterling or nettlings boiler; Dealer in rags or bones (including receiving, storing, sorting or manipulating rags in or likely to become in an offensive condition, or any bones, rabbit-skins, fat or putrescible animal products of like nature); Fat melter or fat extractor; Fellmonger; Fish curer; Fish oil manufacturer; Fish skin dresser or scraper; Glue maker; Gut scraper or gut cleaner; Leather dresser; Maker of meal for feeding poultry, dogs, cattle, or other animals from any fish, blood, bone, fat or animal offal, either in an offensive condition or subjected to any process causing noxious or injurious effluvia; Manufacturer of manure from bones, fish, fish offal, blood, spent hops, beans or other putrescible animal or vegetable matter; Parchment maker; Size maker; Skin drier; Soap boiler; Tallow melter or refiner; Tanner; Tripe boiler or cleaner
Special industrial group E
X	Wholesale warehouse for any purpose
XI	Boarding or guest house, a residential club, or a hotel providing sleeping accommodation
XII	Residential or boarding school or a residential college
XIII	Building for public worship or religious instruction or for the social or recreational activities of the religious body using the building.
XIV	Home or institution providing for the boarding, care and maintenance of children, old people or persons under disability, a convalescent home, a nursing home, a sanatorium or a hospital (other than a hospital, home, hostel or institution included in Class XVI)
XV	Health centre, school treatment centre, clinic, creche, day nursery or dispensary, or use as consulting room or surgery (not residentially)
XVI	Hospital, home or institution for persons of unsound mind, mental defectives, or epileptic persons, or a home, hostel or institution in which persons may be detained by order of a court or which is approved by one of His Majesty's Principal Secretaries of State for persons required to reside there as a condition of a probation or a supervision order
XVII	Art gallery (other than for business purposes), a museum, a public library or reading room, a public hall, a concert hall, an exhibition hall, a social centre, a community centre or a non-residential club
XVIII	Theatre, a cinema, a music hall, a dance hall, a skating rink, a swimming bath, a Turkish or other vapour or foam bath or a gymnasium, or for indoor games.

== See also ==
- Planning use classes in England
- Planning use classes in Wales
