= Planning use classes in the United Kingdom =

Planning use classes in the United Kingdom could refer to:

- Planning use classes in England
- Planning use classes in Northern Ireland
- Planning use classes in Scotland
- Planning use classes in Wales
