= Town and Country Planning (Use Classes) Order 1963 =

- Statutory Instrument
- Parliament of the United Kingdom
- Citation: SI 1963/708
- Territorial extent: England and Wales

Dates
- Made: 29 March 1963
- Commencement: 1 May 1963

Other legislation
- Repeals/revokes: Town and Country Planning (Use Classes) Order 1950
- Made under: Town and Country Planning Act 1947
- Amended by: Town and Country Planning (Use Classes) (Amendment) Order 1965
- Revoked by: Town and Country Planning (Use Classes) Order 1972

Status: Repealed

Text of statute as originally enacted

The Town and Country Planning (Use Classes) Order 1963 (SI 1963/708) is a statutory instrument, applying in England and Wales.

The concept of statutory use classes was introduced by the Town and Country Planning Act 1947. So they could be easily updated from time to time, the classes were set out in secondary legislation. The Town and Country Planning (Use Classes) Order 1948 was the first such order. The Town and Country Planning (Use Classes) Order 1963 revoked the Town and Country Planning (Use Classes) Order 1950.

It was amended by the Town and Country Planning (Use Classes) (Amendment) Order 1965.

It was replaced by the Town and Country Planning (Use Classes) Order 1972.

== See also ==
- Planning use classes in England
- Planning use classes in Wales
