= Construction (Design & Management) =

Construction (Design & Management) may refer to:

- Construction (Design and Management) Regulations 2007
- Construction (Design and Management) Regulations 2015
