= Reserved matters =

Reserved matters may refer to

- Reserved and excepted matters which are subject to UK Parliamentary jurisdiction rather than to devolved government
- Reserved matters in regard to outline planning permission in the United Kingdom, which need to be addressed before full planning permission is granted.
