= Town and Country Planning (Use Classes) Order 1948 =

- Statutory Instrument
- Parliament of the United Kingdom
- Citation: SI 1948/954
- Territorial extent: England and Wales

Dates
- Made: 5 May 1948
- Commencement: 1 July 1948

Other legislation
- Made under: Town and Country Planning Act 1947
- Revoked by: Town and Country Planning (Use Classes) Order 1950

Status: Repealed

Text of statute as originally enacted

The Town and Country Planning (Use Classes) Order 1948 (SI 1948/954) is a statutory instrument, applying in England and Wales.

The concept of statutory use classes was introduced by the Town and Country Planning Act 1947. So they could be easily updated from time to time, the classes were set out in secondary legislation. The Town and Country Planning (Use Classes) Order 1948 was the first such order.

The purpose of the use classes, at least initially, was to determine if planning permission was necessary and if a development charge was payable. The development charge was a tax on the value of the betterment of the land.

The 1948 order was replaced by the Town and Country Planning (Use Classes) Order 1950.

== Use classes ==
There were twenty-two use classes from 1948.

Class	Description
I	Shop (Note: Defined as a building used for the carrying on of any retail trade or retail business wherein the primary purpose is the selling of goods (excluding refreshments other than light refreshments - eatables not cooked on the premises, and beverages) by retail, and without prejudice to the generality of the foregoing includes building used for the purposes of hairdresser, undertaker, ticket agency or receiving office for goods to be washed, cleaned or repaired, or for other purposes appropriate to shopping area, but does not include building used as an amusement arcade, pin-table saloon, funfair, garage, petrol filling station, hotel or premises licensed for the sale of intoxicating liquors for consumption on the premises.) for any purpose except as: (i) fried fish shop; (ii) tripe shop; (iii) shop for the sale of pet animals or birds; (iv) cats-meat shop
II	Office, including a bank
III	Light industrial (Note: Defined as an industrial building (that is not a special industrial building) in which the processes carried on or the machinery installed are such as could be carried on or installed in any residential area without detriment to the amenity of that area by reason of noise, vibration, smell, fumes, smoke, soot, ash, dust or grit.)
IV	General industrial (Note: Defined as other than light industrial building or special industrial building.)
V	Alkali, &c. Works Regulation Act 1906 registerable activity, except ancillary processes Any of the following that are not registerable: (i) smelting, calcining, sintering or other reduction of ores or minerals; (ii) converting, re-heating, annealing, hardening or carburising, forging or casting, of iron or other metals; (iii) galvanising; (iv) recovering of metal from scrap; (v) pickling or treatment of metal in acid; (vi) chromium, plating
Special industrial group A
VI	Any of the following (that are not in Class V): (i) burning of building bricks; (ii) lime and dolomite burning; (iii) carbonisation of coal in coke ovens; (iv) production of calcium carbide, lampblack or zinc oxide; (v) crushing or screening of stone or slag
Special industrial group B
VII	Any of the following (that are not in Class V): The production or employment of; (i) cyanogen or its compounds; (ii) quid or gaseous sulphur dioxide; (iii) sulphur chlorides; Salt glazing; Sintering of sulphur bearing materials; The manufacture of glass, where the sodium sulphate used exceeds 1.5% of the total weight of the melt; The production of ultramarine or zinc chloride
Special industrial group C
VIII	Any of the following (that are not in Class V): The distilling, refining or blending of oils, the production or employment of cellulose lacquers (except their employment in garages in connection with minor repairs), hot pitch or bitumen, or pyridine; the stoving of enamelled ware; the production of amyl acetate, aromatic esters, butyric acid, caramel, hexamine, iodoform, B-naphthol, resin products (except synthetic resins, plastic moulding or extrusion. compositions and plastic sheets, rods, tubes, filaments, fibres or optical components produced by casting, calendering, moulding, shaping or extrusion), salicylic acid, or sulphonated organic compounds; paint and varnish manufacture (excluding mixing, milling and grinding); the production of rubber from scrap; or the manufacture of acetylene from calcium carbide, for sale or for use in a further chemical process
Special industrial group D
IX	Any of the following (that are not in Class V): Animal charcoal manufacturer; Blood albumen maker; Blood boiler; Bone boiler or steamer; Bone burner; Bone grinder; Breeder of maggots from putrescible animal matter; Candle maker; Catgut manufacturer; Chitterling or nettlings boiler; Dealer in rags or bones (including receiving, storing, sorting or manipulating rags in or likely to become in an offensive condition, or any bones, rabbit-skins, fat or putrescible animal products of like nature); Fat melter or fat extractor; Fellmonger; Fish curer; Fish oil manufacturer; Fish skin dresser or scraper; Glue maker; Gut scraper or gut cleaner; Leather dresser; Maker of meal for feeding poultry, dogs, cattle, or other animals from any fish, blood, bone, fat or animal offal, either in an offensive condition or subjected to any process causing noxious or injurious effluvia; Manufacturer of manure from bones, fish, fish offal, blood, spent hops, beans or other putrescible animal or vegetable matter; Parchment maker; Size maker; Skin drier; Soap boiler; Tallow melter or refiner; Tanner; Tripe boiler or cleaner
Special industrial group E
X	Wholesale warehouse for any purpose, except storage of offensive or dangerous goods
XI	Repository for any purpose except storage of offensive or dangerous goods
XII	Building for public worship or religious instruction or for the social or recreational activities of the religious body using the building
XIII	Residential or boarding school, residential college, an orphanage or home or institution providing for the boarding, care and maintenance of children (other than hospital, home, hostel, or institution included in Class XVII or Class XVIII)
XIV	Boarding or guest house, residential club, hostel or hotel providing sleeping accommodation
XV	Convalescent home, nursing home, sanatorium or hospital (not for persons of unsound mind, mental defectives, or epileptic persons)
XVI	Health centre, school treatment centre, clinic, creche, day nursery or dispensary, or use as consulting room or surgery (not residentially)
XVII	Hospital, home or institution for persons of unsound mind, mental defectives, or epileptic persons
XVIII	Home, hostel or institution in which persons may be detained by order of court or which is approved by one of His Majesty’s Principal Secretaries of State for persons required to reside there as condition of probation or supervision order
XIX	Theatre, cinema or music hall
XX	Art gallery (other than for business purposes), museum, public library or public reading room
XXI	Dance hall, skating rink, swimming bath, turkish or other vapour or foam bath or gymnasium, or for indoor games
XXII	Public hall, concert hall, an exhibition hall, social centre, community centre or non-residential club

== See also ==
- Planning use classes in England
- Planning use classes in Wales
