= Town and Country Planning (Use Classes) Order 1987 =

- Statutory Instrument
- Parliament of the United Kingdom
- Citation: SI 1987/764
- Territorial extent: England and Wales

Dates
- Made: 28 April 1987
- Commencement: 1 June 1987

Other legislation
- Repeals/revokes: Town and Country Planning (Use Classes) Order 1972; Town and Country Planning (Use Classes) (Amendment) Order 1983
- Made under: Town and Country Planning Act 1971

Status: Amended

Text of statute as originally enacted

Text of the Town and Country Planning (Use Classes) Order 1987 as in force today (including any amendments) within the United Kingdom, from legislation.gov.uk.

The Town and Country Planning (Use Classes) Order 1987 (SI 1987/764) (the "UCO 1987") is a statutory instrument, applying in England and Wales, that specifies various "Use Classes" for which planning permission is not required for a building or other land to change from one use within that class to another use within that same class. The UCO 1987 was made by the Secretary of State under authority granted by sections 22 and 287 of the Town and Country Planning Act 1971, which have subsequently been replaced by sections 55 and 333 of the Town and Country Planning Act 1990.

These regulations were amended by the Town and Country Planning (Use Classes) (Amendment) (England) Regulations 2020 (SI 2020/757), which took effect on 1 September 2020.

== History of the UCO 1987 ==
The UCO 1987 came into force on 1 June 1987. The UCO 1987 revoked the Town and Country Planning (Use Classes) Order 1972 (SI 1972/1385), which was the previous version of the legislation.

Since it came into force, the UCO 1987 has been amended by a number of subsequent Statutory Instruments. In 1999, the functions of the Secretary of State under various sections of the Town and Country Planning Act 1990 (including sections 55 and 333), so far as exercisable in relation to Wales, were transferred to the National Assembly for Wales. This means that, since 1999, the UCO 1987 has been amended by some statutory instruments that apply in relation to England only and some that apply in relation to Wales only, resulting in different versions of the UCO 1987.

With respect to England, the Planning Portal website provides a page that summarises the Use Classes. With respect to England, the Planning Jungle website states that the UCO 1987 has been amended by a total of 14 subsequent statutory instruments.

== Operation of the UCO 1987 ==
- Section 57 of the Town and Country Planning Act 1990 sets out that "planning permission is required for the carrying out of any development of land".
- Section 55 of the Town and Country Planning Act 1990 defines "development", and states that it does not include "in the case of buildings or other land which are used for a purpose of any class specified in an order made by the Secretary of State under this section, the use of the buildings or other land or, subject to the provisions of the order, of any part of the buildings or the other land, for any other purpose of the same class".
- Article 3 of the UCO 1987 states that "Subject to the provisions of this Order, where a building or other land is used for a purpose of any class specified in the Schedule, the use of that building or that other land for any other purpose of the same class shall not be taken to involve development of the land".
- The Schedule of the UCO 1987 specifies the Use Classes to which Article 3 refers.

== Schedule of the UCO 1987 (the "Use Classes") ==
The Schedule of the UCO 1987 specifies the Use Classes for which planning permission is not required for a building or other land to change from one use within that class to another use within that same class.

The following table shows the Use Classes in relation to England in their "revised" form, as summarised on the Planning Portal website. References have been added to indicate those Use Classes that are different in relation to Wales. This table also shows the permitted changes of use (in relation to England) from schedule 2 part 3 of the Town and Country Planning (General Permitted Development) (England) Order 2015 (SI 2015/596) (note: some of these permitted changes of use require an application for prior approval to be submitted to the local planning authority).

Title of Use Class:	Description of Use Class:	Permitted changes of use:
A1; Shops	Shops, retail warehouses, hairdressers, undertakers, travel and ticket agencies, post offices, pet shops, sandwich bars, showrooms, domestic hire shops, dry cleaners, funeral directors and internet cafes.	Permitted change to A1 and up to 2 flats. Permitted change to A2. Permitted change to A2 and up to 2 flats. Permitted change to A3. Permitted change to B1(a). Permitted change to C3. Permitted change to D2.
A2; Financial and professional services	Financial services such as banks and building societies, professional services (other than health and medical services) and including estate and employment agencies. It does not include betting offices or pay day loan shops - these are now classed as “sui generis” uses (see below).	Permitted change to A1. Permitted change to A1 & up to 2 flats. Permitted change to A2 & up to 2 flats. Permitted change to A3. Permitted change to B1(a). Permitted change to C3. Permitted change to D2.
A3; Restaurants and cafes	For the sale of food and drink for consumption on the premises - restaurants, snack bars and cafes.	Permitted change to A1. Permitted change to A2.
A4; Drinking establishments	Public houses, wine bars or other drinking establishments (but not night clubs).	Permitted change to drinking establishment with expanded food provision.
A5; Hot food takeaways	For the sale of hot food for consumption off the premises.	Permitted change to A1. Permitted change to A2. Permitted change to A3. Permitted change to B1(a). Permitted change to C3.
B1; Business	Offices (other than those that fall within A2), research and development of products and processes, light industry appropriate in a residential area.	Permitted change to B8. Permitted change from B1(a) to C3. Permitted change from B1(c) to C3. Permitted change to state-funded school or registered nursery.
B2; General industrial	Use for industrial process other than one falling within class B1 (excluding incineration purposes, chemical treatment or landfill or hazardous waste).	Permitted change to B1. Permitted change to B8.
B8; Storage or distribution	This class includes open air storage.	Permitted change to B1. Permitted change to C3.
C1; Hotels	Hotels, boarding and guest houses where no significant element of care is provided (excludes hostels).	Permitted change to a state-funded school or registered nursery.
C2; Residential institutions	Residential care homes, hospitals, nursing homes, boarding schools, residential colleges and training centres.	Permitted change to a state-funded school or registered nursery.
C2A; Secure Residential Institution	Use for a provision of secure residential accommodation, including use as a prison, young offenders institution, detention centre, secure training centre, custody centre, short term holding centre, secure hospital, secure local authority accommodation or use as a military barracks.	Permitted change to a state-funded school or registered nursery.
C3; Dwellinghouses	C3(a) covers use by a single person or a family (a couple whether married or not, a person related to one another with members of the family of one of the couple to be treated as members of the family of the other), an employer and certain domestic employees (such as an au pair, nanny, nurse, governess, servant, chauffeur, gardener, secretary and personal assistant), a carer and the person receiving the care and a foster parent and foster child. C3(b): up to six people living together as a single household and receiving care e.g. supported housing schemes such as those for people with learning disabilities or mental health problems. C3(c) allows for groups of people (up to six) living together as a single household. This allows for those groupings that do not fall within the C4 HMO definition, but which fell within the previous C3 use class, to be provided for i.e. a small religious community may fall into this section as could a homeowner who is living with a lodger.	Permitted change to C4.
C4; Houses in multiple occupation	Small shared houses occupied by between three and six unrelated individuals, as their only or main residence, who share basic amenities such as a kitchen or bathroom.	Permitted change to C3.
D1; Non-residential institutions	Clinics, health centres, crèches, day nurseries, day centres, schools, art galleries (other than for sale or hire), museums, libraries, halls, places of worship, church halls, law court. Non residential education and training centres.	Permitted change from use permitted by Part 3 Class T (state-funded school or registered nursery) to previous lawful use of the land.
D2; Assembly and leisure	Cinemas, music and concert halls, bingo and dance halls (but not night clubs), swimming baths, skating rinks, gymnasiums or area for indoor or outdoor sports and recreations (except for motor sports, or where firearms are used).	Permitted change to a state-funded school or registered nursery.
Sui generis	Certain uses do not fall within any use class and are considered 'sui generis'. Such uses include: betting offices/shops, pay day loan shops, theatres, larger houses in multiple occupation, hostels providing no significant element of care, scrap yards. Petrol filling stations and shops selling and/or displaying motor vehicles. Retail warehouse clubs, nightclubs, launderettes, taxi businesses, amusement centres and casinos.	Permitted change from A1 & dwellinghouse to C3. Permitted change from A1 & up to 2 flats to A1. Permitted change from A1 & up to 2 flats to A2. Permitted change from A2 & dwellinghouse to C3. Permitted change from A2 & up to 2 flats to A1. Permitted change from A2 & up to 2 flats to A2. Permitted change from agricultural building to C3. Permitted change from agricultural building to flexible A1/A2/A3/B1/B8/C1/D2. Permitted change from agricultural building to state-funded school or registered nursery. Permitted change from amusement arcade or centre to C3. Permitted change from betting office to A1. Permitted change from betting office to A1 & up to 2 flats. Permitted change from betting office to A2. Permitted change from betting office to A2 & up to 2 flats. Permitted change from betting office to A3. Permitted change from betting office to B1(a). Permitted change from betting office to C3. Permitted change from betting office to D2. Permitted change from betting office to betting office & up to 2 flats. Permitted change from betting office & dwellinghouse to C3. Permitted change from betting office & up to 2 flats to A1. Permitted change from betting office & up to 2 flats to A2. Permitted change from betting office & up to 2 flats to betting office. Permitted change from casino to A3. Permitted change from casino to C3. Permitted change from casino to D2. Permitted change from drinking establishment with expanded food provision to A4. Permitted change from launderette to B1(a). Permitted change from launderette to C3. Permitted change from launderette & dwellinghouse to C3. Permitted change from pay day loan shop to A1. Permitted change from pay day loan shop to A1 & up to 2 flats. Permitted change from pay day loan shop to A2. Permitted change from pay day loan shop to A2 & up to 2 flats. Permitted change from pay day loan shop to A3. Permitted change from pay day loan shop to B1(a). Permitted change from pay day loan shop to C3. Permitted change from pay day loan shop to D2. Permitted change from pay day loan shop to pay day loan shop & up to 2 flats. Permitted change from pay day loan shop & dwellinghouse to C3. Permitted change from pay day loan shop & up to 2 flats to A1. Permitted change from pay day loan shop & up to 2 flats to A2. Permitted change from pay day loan shop & up to 2 flats to pay day loan shop.

== See also ==
- Town and country planning in the United Kingdom
