= Planning use classes in England =

Framework which determines use of a property

Planning use classes are the legal framework which determines what a particular property may be used for by its lawful occupants in England.

== Background ==
The concept of statutory use classes was introduced by the Town and Country Planning Act 1947. So they could be easily updated from time to time, the classes were set out in secondary legislation, the Town and Country Planning (Use Classes) Order 1948. The 1947 legislation considered any change of use of a building or land to be "development" but not if the uses were within the same class. The use classes covered England and Wales, with Scotland legislated for separately under the Town and Country Planning (Scotland) Act 1947. The purpose of the use classes, at least initially, was to determine if planning permission was necessary and if a development charge was payable. The development charge was a tax on the value of the betterment of the land. Development charges were withdrawn on 18 November 1952.

The first order contained twenty-two use classes. The schedule of use classes was revised by new orders in 1950 (amended in 1960), 1963 (amended in 1965) and 1972 (amended in 1983). The current statutory framework of use classes, since 1 June 1987, is the Town and Country Planning (Use Classes) Order 1987 which has been amended multiple times and, since Welsh devolution and as amended by the Welsh Parliament, applies different planning use classes in Wales. In England, there was a significant amendment to use classes in England in 2020 which deviated from those used elsewhere in the United Kingdom.

== Classification ==
The classes of potential uses are divided into groups. For example, the uses falling under Part C are types of residences. Each part is further divided into sub-groups, which each then contains the specific uses the law is actually concerned with. Each of the subgroups is assigned a letter and a number, creating, for example, 'class C1 use' for hotels. Each class is used by the local planning authority to allow them to create a suitable balance between residential areas and those for business purposes. The aim is to prevent types of business activities taking place which would have a detrimental effect on the local community. A hypothetical example might be to veto the location of a proposed heavy metal works or all night club beside a school or housing estate. Not every use of building is assigned a class under this legislation.

As of March 2024, the use classes are:

- B2 – General industrial
- B8 – Storage or distribution
- C1 – Hotels
- C2 – Residential institutions
- C2A – Secure residential institutions
- C3 – Dwellinghouses
- C4 – House in multiple occupation
- E – Commercial, business and service
- F1 – Learning and non-residential institutions
- F2 – Local community
- Sui generis – No class specified

== Current use classes ==
Class	Category	Description
B2	General industrial	Industrial processes that do not fall under Class E
B8	Storage or distribution	Includes warehouses and distribution centres
C1	Hotels	Hotel, boarding or guest house where no significant element of care is provided
C2	Residential institutions	Residential accommodation and care to people in need of care, hospital or nursing home, residential school, college or training centre
C2A	Secure residential institutions	Secure residential accommodation, including use as a prison, young offenders institution, detention centre, secure training centre, custody centre, short-term holding centre, secure hospital, secure local authority accommodation or use as military barracks
C3	Dwellinghouses	Used as a dwellinghouse by: a) a single person or people regarded as a single household; b) not more than six residents living together as a single household where care is provided for residents; c) not more than six residents living together as a single household where no care is provided to residents
C4	House in multiple occupation	Used as a dwellinghouse by not more than six residents
E	Commercial, business and service	a) Display or retail sale of goods, other than hot food; b) Sale of food and drink for consumption (mostly) on the premises; c) Provision of: i) Financial services; ii) Professional services (other than health or medical services); iii) Other appropriate services in a commercial, business or service locality; d) Indoor sport, recreation or fitness (not involving motorised vehicles or firearms or use as a swimming pool or skating rink); e) Provision of medical or health services (except the use of premises attached to the residence of the consultant or practitioner); f) Creche, day nursery or day centre (not including a residential use); g) Uses which can be carried out in a residential area without detriment to its amenity: i) Offices to carry out any operational or administrative functions; ii) Research and development of products or processes; iii) Industrial processes
F1	Learning and non-residential institutions	Any use not including residential use: a) for the provision of education; b) for the display of works of art (otherwise than for sale or hire); c) as a museum; d) as a public library or public reading room; e) as a public hall or exhibition hall; f) public worship or religious instruction; g) as a law court
F2	Local community	a) Shops (mostly) selling essential goods, including food, where the shop’s premises do not exceed 280 square metres and there is no other such facility within 1000 metres; b) Halls or meeting places for the principal use of the local community; c) Areas or places for outdoor sport or recreation (not involving motorised vehicles or firearms); d) Indoor or outdoor swimming pools or skating rinks
Sui generis	No class specified	Uses that are specifically excluded from classification: theatres; amusement arcades/centres or funfairs; launderettes; fuel stations; hiring, selling and/or displaying motor vehicles; taxi businesses; scrap yards, or a yard for the storage/distribution of minerals and/or the breaking of motor vehicles; Alkali work (any work registerable under the Alkali, &c. Works Regulation Act 1906); hostels (providing no significant element of care); waste disposal installations for the incineration, chemical treatment or landfill of hazardous waste; retail warehouse clubs; nightclubs; casinos; betting offices/shops; pay day loan shops; public houses, wine bars, or drinking establishments; drinking establishments with expanded food provision; hot food takeaways (for the sale of hot food where consumption of that food is mostly undertaken off the premises); venues for live music performance; cinemas; concert halls; bingo halls; dance halls

== Withdrawn use classes ==
=== Class A ===
Shops. This heading is further sub-divided into a variety of everyday commercial uses.

==== Class A1 ====
Shops and retail outlets. For those within Class A1, the customers in all cases should be “visiting members of the general public”. Property in this area could include:

- Shops (where goods are sold) – but excluding betting offices and payday loan shops which are sui generis
- Post offices
- Premises where tickets are sold and travel agents
- Premises selling cold food (intended for consumption off site)
- Hairdressers
- Florist
- Funeral directors
- Premises where goods for sale are displayed (a showroom)
- Premises where “domestic or personal” goods or services are hired from
- Premises where articles are deposited for washing, cleaning or repair

Became use class E in 2020.

==== Class A2 ====
Professional services. Class A2 moves on to cover “financial and professional services”. Again, these must be offered to the general public. This time, the specification is that “principally” the clients or customers of these types of businesses will again be visiting the premises:

- Financial services
- Professional services – except those involving health or medical services
- Any other services deemed “appropriate” for location within a shopping area

Became use class E in 2020.

==== Class A3 ====
Class A3 consists of one use, namely premises which are to sell “Food and drink”, either to be consumed on site, or on or offsite in the case of hot food. This includes restaurants and cafes. Became use class E in 2020.

==== Class A4 ====
Drinking establishments such as public houses, wine bars or other such establishments. Became sui generis in 2020.

==== Class A5 ====
For the sale of hot food intended for consumption off the premises. Became sui generis in 2020.

==== Class B ====
This class covers many common business activities, and is prefaced by the provision for “all or any of” the activities described in Class B1:

==== Class B1 ====
B1(a): Offices – except those already mentioned within Class A2. B1(b): Premises for Research and Development B1(c): Industrial processes which “can” take place within a residential area without damaging the “amenity of that area”

Since these classes are described in quite general terms, professional advice is advisable before proceeding with negotiations to occupy commercial premises. As the remaining Classes in Part B continue, the uses begin to relate to increasingly specific industrial processes. Became use class E in 2020.

=== Class D ===
==== Class D1 ====
Class D1 covered many ‘public’ services (which do not fall under Class A): These are mostly F1 or F2 as of 2021.

- Medical or health services premises which don't form a part of the practitioner's home
- Crèches, day nurseries or day centres
- Premises for education, is now Class F
- Premises which display works of art without commercial transactions (sale or hire)
- Museums
- Public libraries or reading rooms
- Public or exhibition halls
- Premises “for, or in connection with, public worship or religious instruction”

D1 was split and replaced by use classes E and F1 in 2020.

==== Class D2 ====
Class D2 used to address the use of premises for entertainment and leisure purposes:

- Cinemas
- Concert halls
- Bingo halls (and formerly casinos)
- Dance halls
- Swimming baths, skating rinks, gymnasiums or “area for other indoor or outdoor sports or recreations, not involving motorised vehicles or firearms.”

Class D2 was split and replaced by classes E, F2 and sui generis in 2020.

== See also ==
- Planning use classes in Wales
