= Article 4 direction =

UK local restriction on development rights

An Article 4 direction is made by a local planning authority in the United Kingdom and exceptionally may be subject to intervention by the government. It serves to restrict permitted development rights, which means that a lot of the things people do to their land or houses without planning permission and often take for granted, are brought into the realms of planning consent. It does not in itself prohibit any action but means that a landowner is required to seek planning consent whereas without the direction this would not be necessary.

An Article 4 direction is not a conservation designation as such. It is a statement made under the Town and Country Planning Acts, specifically the Town and Country Planning (General Permitted Development) Order 1995. The direction removes all or some of the permitted development rights on a site. For example, it could stop a landowner from holding car boot sales on their land for 14 days per year—a right which they would otherwise have—or could restrict a householder from converting a property into multiple flats.

There are certain permitted development rights that cannot be withdrawn by an Article 4 direction. These exemptions are to ensure permitted development rights related to national concerns, safety, or maintenance work for existing facilities cannot be withdrawn.

Article 4 directions were in the past a rarely used instrument which was not particularly effective, and was difficult to apply as it always required the approval of the Secretary of State. The 1995 Town and Country Planning (General Permitted Development) Order made significant improvements to the process, and since that time the use of Article 4 directions has increased.

== Types of Article 4 direction ==
Since 1995 there have been three types of direction:

- directions under article 4(2) affecting conservation areas. The aim of an Article 4(2) Direction is to encourage the retention of high-quality architectural features and to preserve and enhance the character and appearance of the built heritage. The designation of a Conservation Area only goes some way towards protecting the integrity of buildings and their character. Under the Town and Country Planning Act (General Permitted Development) Order 1995, permitted development rights enable property owners within a conservation area to undertake small-scale extensions and/or alterations without the need for planning permission. Where these rights are unchecked, they can erode the special interest of the conservation area.
- directions under article 4(1) affecting only listed buildings; and
- directions under article 4(1) affecting other land.

== Powers to make a direction ==
A direction under either article 4(1) or 4(2) of the 1995 order may be made by the district or county planning authority in relation to a conservation area, but only by the district/borough council in other cases. The Secretary of State may also make a direction.

== See also ==
- Conservation in the United Kingdom
