= Planning permission in the United Kingdom =

Overview of planning permission in the UK

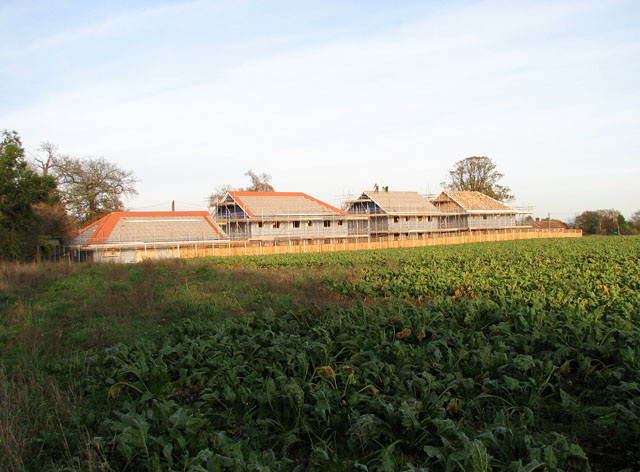
New houses under construction in Norfolk. Planning permission was required for such a development and would be granted by the local planning authority, subject to conditions.

In the United Kingdom, England central planning permission is required in order to be allowed to build on land, or change the use of land or buildings. Within the UK the occupier of any land or building will need title to that land or building (i.e. "ownership"), but will also need "planning title" or planning permission. Planning title was granted for all pre-existing uses and buildings by the Town and Country Planning Act 1947, which came into effect on 1 July 1948. Since that date any new "development" has required planning permission.

== Development and permitted development ==
"Development" as defined by law consists of any building, engineering or mining operation, or the making of a material change of use in any land or building. Certain types of operation such as routine maintenance of an existing building are specifically excluded from the definition of development.

Specified categories of development are granted an automatic planning permission by law, and therefore do not require any application for planning permission. These categories are referred to as permitted development.

In the case of any proposal there is therefore a two-stage test: "is the proposal development at all?" and, if the proposal is development, "is it permitted development?" Only if a development is not permitted development would an application for planning permission be required. An application for planning permission should be made to the local planning authority (LPA).

== Local planning authorities ==
Local planning authorities (LPAs) are generally the local borough or district council ('local authority' in Scotland), although an application for a mining operation, minerals extraction, or a waste management facility would be decided by the local county council in non-metropolitan areas. Within a national park, planning applications are submitted to the national park authority.

All LPAs have their own website where relevant application forms, contact details and other relevant documents can be accessed by the public. LPAs are generally receptive to pre-application discussion in order to clarify whether a proposal will require planning permission and, assuming that it does, the probability of such planning permission being granted.

== Determination ==
The law requires that all applications for planning permission should be decided in accordance with the policies of the "development plan" – unless material planning considerations indicate otherwise. The decision on any planning application is therefore "policy-led" rather than "influence-led". Although the public and nearby residents will be consulted about almost any planning application, the decision will not be made on the grounds of popularity or unpopularity. The framing of the decision by reference to published planning policy prevents the decision on a planning application being made on grounds which are arbitrary, perverse, or subject to impropriety.

It is therefore most important that applicants for planning permission satisfy themselves about the relevant local development plan policies before making an application. These can also be viewed via the LPA's website, or the UK government's Planning Portal, which provides a nationwide clearing house on planning information and advice for both government and local planning policies. As a practical matter it is very advisable to discuss proposals with the LPA or an experienced planning consultant who can provide independent advice before incurring the fees and other costs that are involved in making a planning application, or the delays and abortive costs that would arise from the refusal of planning permission.

== Types of application ==
A number of different types of planning permission can be applied for:

- Full planning permission: a full planning permission would grant permission for all aspects of the proposed development, although it would generally be subject to various conditions (see below).
- Outline planning permission: outline planning permission establishes whether the scale and nature of a proposed development would be acceptable to the local planning authority. It might be appropriate when an applicant is seeking an agreement "in principle" to a proposed development, without being committed to a particular form of design or layout.
- Approval of "reserved matters": seeking permission for those aspects that were not dealt with in an outline planning permission, or seeking approval of aspects of a development which were reserved by a planning condition in an earlier grant of full planning permission.
- Hybrid: a LPA may accept a 'hybrid' application, that is, one that seeks outline planning permission for one part and full planning permission for another part of the same site.

Once a permission has been granted, the following additional applications may be made:

- Renewal of planning permission: This would arise when an earlier outline or full planning permission was subject to a time-limiting condition which has since expired. In essence this requires the entire planning application to be reviewed in light of current rather than previous planning policies. Applications for renewal of an earlier planning permission are usually granted anew, unless there has been a significant change in the relevant material considerations which are to be weighed in the decision.
- Removal or alteration of a planning condition: As a matter of law, conditions should only be imposed on a grant of planning permission when compliance with that condition is essential to make an unacceptable development acceptable – so it would be refused planning permission were it not for that condition. If the applicant or developer wished to proceed with a development without compliance with a condition, or perhaps with the condition in an alternative form, then an application can be made to "vary" the condition concerned – possibly by deleting it or offering an alternative form of words. Note that the LPA cannot alter any planning condition which imposes a time limit when the development is to be commenced. That would require a re-application for full or outline planning permission, but since October 2009 it has been possible to apply to extend an existing consent.

The fee for each part would have to be calculated separately on the appropriate basis, subject to any relevant maximum, and the total - which would not be subject to any maximum - would then be chargeable. An authority may also, following discussion, allow an application to be separated into core elements so that permission for site preparation works, say, can be given priority. Whether to accept a proposal in hybrid form is at the discretion of the LPA, not something on which an applicant may insist. One should bear in mind that a LPA is empowered to require details even when the application is in outline, if necessary in the interest of good planning. The term ‘hybrid application’ is not defined in statute.

An application for a change of use of a site, for example from residential use to commercial use, may be made on its own or in conjunction with an application for permission to develop the site for new purpose. The legal framework of planning use classes in England is set out in the Town and Country Planning (Use Classes) (Amendment) (England) Regulations 2020 (SI 2020 No.757), which took effect on 1 September 2020. These regulations amended the Town and Country Planning (Use Classes) Order 1987.

== Conditions ==
In the United Kingdom a planning condition is a condition placed on a grant of planning permission. Such conditions permit development to go ahead only if certain conditions are satisfied. Conditions include time limits on development, undertakings regarding environmental and noise issues and limits on the size and external appearance of a new development.

Planning permissions are usually granted subject to a planning condition which requires the development to be commenced within three years. Typically they will also include a number of other conditions, for example undertakings regarding environmental and noise issues; limits on the size and external appearance of a new development; requirements for the scheme to be built in accordance with the approved drawings, trees to be planted as per the landscape scheme and replaced if they die in the first few years, or that the colour and finish of external materials be approved by the LPA. Some of these will need to be complied with before any work starts on site; others will take effect once the development is commenced, or later.

Most conditions imposed on a granted planning permission will relate to implementation of works within the actual site of the application (the edges of which must be defined by a red line marked on an accurately scaled map of the site, usually an Ordnance Survey extract, accompanying the application). If there is a need to control aspects of the development which are required to occur outside the defined application site (such as related highway improvements) then the implementation of those aspects can be required by a Grampian condition. This would be worded to the effect that the development being permitted must not be commenced (or must not be occupied, as appropriate), until the required off-site works had been completed.

Planning conditions are imposed to require that something is done or not done by the developer in order to make the development acceptable. Sometimes, planning permission will only be granted subject to the applicant entering into a legal agreement under Section 106 of the Town and Country Planning Act requiring that certain things be done or money be paid to the LPA e.g. to contribute towards the improvement of local highways, schools, open spaces or other facilities serving the development before the development is completed or occupied. Such contributions can only be required if they are necessary to make the development acceptable, reasonable, and relate directly to the development proposed.

Planning permission may also be declined where the development does not meet affordable housing targets. This was confirmed in the case of Parkhurst Road Ltd v Secretary of State for Communities And Local Government, in which Islington Council refused a developer's application as it did not meet “the maximum reasonable amount of affordable housing” (See judgment at paragraph 14). The developer's argument that no affordable homes would be built if their proposal was refused was held to be no excuse not to meet affordable housing requirements. This judgement also demonstrates how overpaying for land for development does not allow developers to bypass affordable housing requirements by way of 'self-inflicted financial unviability'.

== Criticism ==
The planning permission system has been criticised for being "too slow, bureaucratic and expensive", thus contributing to the housing crisis in the UK. As of January 2015, there were 150,000 homes waiting to progress from the "outline" planning stage to the "detailed" planning stage.

In the Commons Briefing Paper "Tackling the under-supply of housing in England", Barton and Wilson argue that, due to the increased value granted planning permission can offer land, "strategic land trading" by developers is contributing to the UK's housing crisis.

In a notable 2000 case, Kelly Davis, a construction worker from Bath, successfully sued the former Wansdyke District Council (later succeeded by Bath and North East Somerset Council) for racial discrimination after being repeatedly denied planning permission between 1989 and 1991. A judge at Bristol County Court found that the planning officers had acted in a “consistently unhelpful and obstructive fashion,” concluding that this could only be explained by Davis being “the only Black builder in Wansdyke.”

== See also ==
- Land banking
- Town and country planning in the United Kingdom
- Town and Country Planning Act 1990
- Listed building
- Scheduled monument
- National Register of Historic Parks and Gardens
- Protection of Wrecks Act 1973
- Conservation area (United Kingdom)
