= General Permitted Development Order =

United Kingdom legislation

Town and Country Planning (General Permitted Development) (England) Order 2015
- Statutory Instrument
- Parliament of the United Kingdom
- Citation: SI 2015/596
- Territorial extent: England

Dates
- Made: 18 March 2015
- Laid before Parliament: 24 March 2015
- Commencement: 15 April 2015

Other legislation
- Repeals/revokes: Town and Country Planning (General Permitted Development) Order 1995 (Note: The 1995 Order was only revoked insofar as it applied to England; it remains in effect in relation to Wales.)
- Made under: Town and Country Planning Act 1990; Coal Industry Act 1994

Status: Amended

Text of statute as originally enacted

Town and Country Planning (General Permitted Development) Order 1995
- Statutory Instrument
- Parliament of the United Kingdom
- Citation: SI 1995/418
- Territorial extent: ~~England and~~ Wales

Dates
- Made: 22 February 1995
- Laid before Parliament: 6 March 1995
- Commencement: 3 June 1995

Other legislation
- Repeals/revokes: Town and Country Planning General Development Order 1988
- Made under: Town and Country Planning Act 1990; Coal Industry Act 1994
- Revoked by: Town and Country Planning (General Permitted Development) (England) Order 2015

Status: Amended

Text of statute as originally enacted

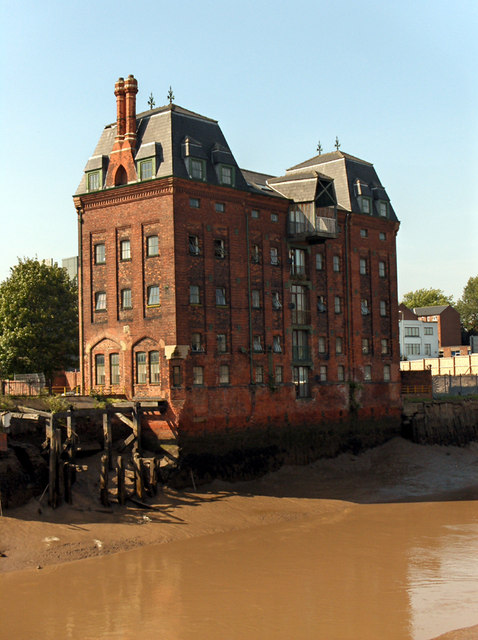
Warehouse conversion to flats in Hull. Development of this type is sometimes allowed under the GPDO.

The Town and Country Planning (General Permitted Development) (England) Order 2015 (SI 2015/596) (the "GPDO 2015") is a statutory instrument, applying in England, that grants planning permission for certain types of development without the requirement for approval from the local planning authority (such development is then referred to as permitted development).

Schedule 2 of the GPDO 2015 specifies the classes of development for which planning permission is granted, and specifies the exceptions, limitations, and conditions that apply to some of these classes. The GPDO 2015 was made by the Secretary of State under authority granted by sections 59, 60, and 333 of the Town and Country Planning Act 1990, and section 54 of the Coal Industry Act 1994. The Order revokes and replaces the Town and Country Planning (General Permitted Development) Order 1995.

== History ==
The GPDO 2015 came into force in England on 15 April 2015, and was introduced by Statutory Instrument 2015 No. 596. The GPDO 2015 revoked the Town and Country Planning (General Permitted Development) Order 1995 (SI 1995/418) (the "GPDO 1995"), in England, which was the previous version of the legislation, and which remains current in Wales.

Since it came into force, the GPDO 2015 has been amended by a number of subsequent statutory instruments, including SI 2016/332, SI 2016/1040, SI 2017/391, SI 2017/619, SI 2018/343, SI 2019/907, SI 2020/330, SI 2020/412, and SI 2020/632.

The website www.legislation.gov.uk, which is delivered by the National Archives, provides the original ("as made") version of the GPDO 2015, but states that UK statutory instruments are not carried in their "revised" form on the website.

The earlier version of the legislation, the GPDO 1995, came into force on 3 June 1995. The GPDO 1995 has been amended by a number of subsequent statutory instruments. With respect to England, the Planning Jungle website states that the GPDO 1995 was amended by a total of 37 subsequent statutory instruments.

Town and Country Planning General Development Order 1948
- Statutory Instrument
- Parliament of the United Kingdom
- Citation: SI 1948/958
- Territorial extent: England and Wales

Dates
- Made: 5 May 1948
- Laid before Parliament: 6 May 1948
- Commencement: 1 July 1948

Other legislation
- Made under: Town and Country Planning Act 1947

Status: Revoked

Text of statute as originally enacted

Town and Country Planning General Development Order 1959
- Statutory Instrument
- Parliament of the United Kingdom
- Territorial extent: England and Wales

Dates
- Made: 27 July 1959
- Laid before Parliament: 29 July 1959
- Commencement: 16 August 1959

Other legislation
- Made under: Town and Country Planning Act 1947; Town and Country Planning Act 1959

Status: Revoked

Text of statute as originally enacted

Town and Country Planning General Development Order 1963
- Statutory Instrument
- Parliament of the United Kingdom
- Citation: SI 1963/709
- Territorial extent: England and Wales

Dates
- Made: 29 March 1963
- Laid before Parliament: 8 April 1963
- Commencement: 1 May 1963

Other legislation
- Repeals/revokes: Town and Country Planning General Development Order 1950; Town and Country Planning General Development (Amendment) Order 1958; Town and Country Planning General Development (Amendment) Order 1960; Town and Country Planning General Development (Amendment No. 2) Order 1960
- Made under: Town and Country Planning Act 1962
- Revoked by: Town and Country Planning General Development Order 1973

Status: Revoked

Text of statute as originally enacted

Town and Country Planning General Development Order 1973
- Statutory Instrument
- Parliament of the United Kingdom
- Citation: SI 1973/31
- Territorial extent: England and Wales

Dates
- Made: 8 January 1973
- Laid before Parliament: 19 January 1973
- Commencement: 1 March 1973

Other legislation
- Repeals/revokes: Town and Country Planning General Development Order 1963; Town and Country Planning General Development (Amendment) Order 1964; Town and Country Planning General Development (Amendment) Order 1965; Town and Country Planning General Development (Amendment) Order 1967; Town and Country Planning General Development (Amendment) Order 1968; Town and Country Planning General Development (Amendment) Order 1969
- Made under: Town and Country Planning Act 1971
- Revoked by: Town and Country Planning General Development Order 1977

Status: Revoked

Text of statute as originally enacted

Town and Country Planning General Development Order 1977
- Statutory Instrument
- Parliament of the United Kingdom
- Citation: SI 1977/289
- Territorial extent: England and Wales

Dates
- Made: 22 February 1977
- Laid before Parliament: 8 March 1977
- Commencement: 29 March 1977

Other legislation
- Repeals/revokes: Town and Country Planning General Development Order 1973
- Made under: Town and Country Planning Act 1971; Local Government Act 1972
- Revoked by: Town and Country Planning General Development Order 1973

Status: Revoked

Text of statute as originally enacted

Town and Country Planning General Development Order 1988
- Statutory Instrument
- Parliament of the United Kingdom
- Citation: SI 1988/1813
- Territorial extent: England and Wales

Dates
- Made: 21 October 1988
- Laid before Parliament: 31 October 1988
- Commencement: 5 December 1988

Other legislation
- Repeals/revokes: Town and Country Planning General Development Order 1977
- Made under: Town and Country Planning Act 1971; Local Government Act 1972
- Revoked by: Town and Country Planning (General Permitted Development) Order 1995

Status: Revoked

Text of statute as originally enacted

The following list shows all of the versions of the GPDO from 1948 to present:

- The Town and Country Planning General Development Order 1948 (SI 1948/958)
- The Town and Country Planning General Development Order 1959 (SI 1959/1286)
- The Town and Country Planning General Development Order 1963 (SI 1963/709)
- The Town and Country Planning General Development Order 1973 (SI 1973/31)
- The Town and Country Planning General Development Order 1977 (SI 1977/289)
- The Town and Country Planning General Development Order 1988 (SI 1988/1813)
- The Town and Country Planning (General Permitted Development) Order 1995 (SI 1995/418)
- The Town and Country Planning (General Permitted Development) (England) Order 2015 (SI 2015/596)

== Operation of the GPDO 2015 ==
- Article 1 sets out that the GPDO 2015 applies to all land in England, with exceptions where the land is the subject of a special development order.
- Article 2 defines various terms within the GPDO 2015.
- Article 3 sets out that the GPDO 2015 grants planning permission for the classes of development in Schedule 2 (referred to as "permitted development"), subject to any relevant exception, limitation or condition specified in Schedule 2. Article 3 also sets out a number of exceptions, including that the GPDO 2015 does not permit development contrary to any condition imposed by any planning permission, and that the GPDO 2015 does not grant permission where the existing building or use is unlawful.
- Article 4 sets out that the Secretary of State or the local planning authority may make a direction (referred to as an Article 4 direction) restricting certain permitted development rights. Schedule 3 sets out the procedure for introducing Article 4 directions.
- Schedule 1 Part 1 defines "article 2(3) land", which includes land which is a national park, an Area of Outstanding Natural Beauty, a conservation area, The Broads, or a World Heritage Site.
- Schedule 1 Part 3, which was deleted with effect from 31 May 2019, defined "article 2(5) land", which consisted of designated areas within a total of 17 different local authorities.
- Schedule 2 specifies the classes of development to which article 3 refers (i.e. for which planning permission is granted). These classes are contained within 21 "Parts" (i.e. Parts 1 to 20, including Part 12A).

== Schedule 2 of the GPDO 2015 ==
Schedule 2 specifies the classes of development for which planning permission is granted, and specifies the exceptions, limitations, and conditions that apply to some of these classes. These classes are contained within the following 20 "Parts":

- Part 1: Development within the curtilage of a dwellinghouse.
- Part 2: Minor operations.
- Part 3: Changes of use.
- Part 4: Temporary buildings and uses.
- Part 5: Caravan sites and recreational campsites.
- Part 6: Agricultural and forestry.
- Part 7: Non-domestic extensions, alterations etc.
- Part 8: Transport-related development.
- Part 9: Development relating to roads.
- Part 10: Repairs to services.
- Part 11: Heritage and demolition.
- Part 12: Development by local authorities.
- Part 12A: Development by Local Authorities and Health Service Bodies
- Part 13: Water and sewerage.
- Part 14: Renewable energy.
- Part 15: Power related development.
- Part 16: Communications.
- Part 17: Mining and mineral exploration.
- Part 18: Miscellaneous development.
- Part 19: Development by the Crown or for national security purposes.
- Part 20: Construction of New Dwellinghouses

== Prior approval ==
Some classes of permitted development are subject to a pre-commencement condition that an application be made to the local planning authority (LPA) for their prior approval, or their determination as to whether prior approval is required, in respect of specified matters before the development is begun.

For example, in the case of a change of use of an agricultural building to a dwellinghouse under Part 3, Class Q, the developer needs to apply to the LPA with respect to for a determination as to whether the prior approval of the authority will be required as to the transport and highways impacts of the development, noise impacts of the development, contamination risks on the site, flooding risks on the site, whether the location or siting of the building makes it otherwise impractical or undesirable for the building to change from agricultural use to a use as a dwellinghouse, the design or external appearance of the building, and the provision of adequate natural light in all habitable rooms of the dwellinghouses.

Prior approval applications must be determined within specified periods or prior approval will be deemed to be granted. However, the development must be carried out after prior approval is granted and in accordance with the submitted plans, otherwise, it will be development without the benefit of the planning permission granted by the GPDO 2015.

There is a right of appeal to the Secretary of State via The Planning Inspectorate against a refusal of prior approval by an LPA.

== Householder permitted development ==
The phrase "permitted development" is often used to refer to Schedule 2 Part 1, which relates to "Development within the curtilage of a dwellinghouse".

=== Householder permitted development in England ===
With respect to England, householder permitted development is set out by Schedule 2 Part 1 of the GPDO 2015, as introduced on 15 April 2015 by SI 2015 No. 596, then amended on 6 April 2016 by SI 2016 No. 332, then amended on 6 April 2017 by SI 2017 No. 391, then amended on 1 June 2018 by SI 2018 No. 119, then amended on 25 May 2019 by SI 2019 No. 907, and then amended on 1 August 2020 by SI 2020 No. 632

In September 2008, the Department for Communities and Local Government ("DCLG") published a document titled Guidance on the permeable surfacing of front gardens, which provides advice about how to interpret Part 1 Class F. This document was subsequently updated in May 2009.

In August 2010, DCLG published a document titled Permitted development rights for householders: technical guidance, which provides advice about how to interpret Part 1. This document was subsequently updated in January 2013, October 2013, April 2014, April 2016, April 2017, and September 2019.

In May 2013, DCLG published a document titled "Home Extensions - Neighbour Consultation Scheme", which provided advice about the system of larger rear extensions under Part 1 Class A. This document was subsequently updated in June 2013 and June 2015. In March 2016, this document was replaced by a document published by the Planning Portal (see below).

In May 2014, DCLG published the "Planning practice guidance", which includes a section titled "What are permitted development rights?". This website is updated on an ongoing basis.

In March 2016, the Planning Portal published a document titled "Notification of a proposed larger Home Extension", which provides advice about the system of larger rear extensions under Part 1 Class A. This document was subsequently updated in May 2019, August 2019, and November 2019. The current version of this document is titled Application to determine if prior approval is required for a proposed: Larger Home Extension.

In the above "Permitted development rights for householders: technical guidance" document, the 8 classes of Schedule 2 Part 1 are described as follows:

- Class A covers the enlargement, improvement or alterations to a house such as rear or side extensions as well as general alterations such as new windows and doors. From 30 May 2013 to 30 May 2019 a neighbour consultation scheme for larger rear extensions under Class A is required.
- Class B covers additions or alterations to roofs which enlarge the house such as loft conversions involving dormer windows.
- Class C covers other alterations to roofs such as re-roofing or the installation of roof lights/windows.
- Class D covers the erection of a porch outside an external door.
- Class E covers the provision of buildings and other development within the curtilage of the house.
- Class F covers the provision of hard surfaces within the curtilage of the house such as driveways.
- Class G covers the installation, alteration, or replacement of a chimney, flue or soil and vent pipe.
- Class H covers the installation, alteration, or replacement of microwave antenna such as satellite dishes.

For the above legislation, public consultations were undertaken from 21 May 2007 to 17 August 2007, from 12 November 2012 to 24 December 2012, from 31 July 2014 to 26 September 2014, and from 29 October 2018 to 14 January 2019.

=== Householder permitted development in Wales ===
With respect to Wales, householder permitted development is set out by Schedule 2 Part 1 of the GPDO 1995, as amended on 30 September 2013 by Statutory Instrument 2013 No. 1776.

In July 2013, the Welsh Government published a document titled "Technical Guidance: Permitted development for householders", which provides advice about how to interpret Part 1. This document was subsequently updated in April 2014.

For the above legislation, a public consultation was undertaken from 23 November 2010 to 15 February 2011.

== Amendments since 2013 ==
With respect to England, Schedule 2 Parts 1, 2, 3, 4, 7, and 16 were amended on 30 May 2013 by SI 2013 No. 1101, Part 16 was amended on 21 August 2013 by SI 2013 No. 1868, Part 11 was amended on 1 October 2013 by SI 2013 No. 2147 and by SI 2013 No. 2435, Parts 1, 2, 3, 6, and 7 were amended on 6 April 2014 by SI 2014 No. 564, Parts 3, 4, and 11 were amended on 6 April 2015 by SI 2015 No. 659, all Parts were amended on 15 April 2015 by SI 2015 No. 596, Parts 1, 3, 4, and 17 were amended on 6 April 2016 by SI 2016 No. 332, Part 16 was amended on 24 November 2016 by SI 2016 No. 1040, Parts 1, 4, 7, 14, and 15 were amended on 6 April 2017 by SI 2017 No. 391, Parts 3, 4, and 11 were amended on 23 May 2017 by SI 2017 No. 619, Parts 3, 6, 9, and 16 were amended on 6 April 2018 by SI 2018 No. 343, Parts 1, 2, 3, 4, 7, and 16 were amended on 25 May 2019 by SI 2019 No. 907, Part 4 was amended on 24 March 2020 by SI 2020 No. 330, Part 12A was introduced on 9 April 2020 by SI 2020 No. 412, and Parts 3, 4, 12 were amended and Part 20 was introduced on 25 June 2020 and 1 August 2020 by SI 2020 No. 632.

For the above changes, public consultations were undertaken from 8 April 2011 to 30 June 2011, from 3 July 2012 to 11 September 2012, from 12 November 2012 to 24 December 2012, from 3 May 2013 to 14 June 2013, from 6 August 2013 to 15 October 2013, from 31 July 2014 to 26 September 2014, from 5 March 2015 to 16 April 2015, from 13 August 2015 to 24 September 2015, and from 18 February 2016 to 15 April 2016, and from 29 October 2018 to 14 January 2019.

On 25 May 2019 Housing Minister Kit Malthouse MP announced that temporary changes to Permitted Development Rights, in place since 2012 and due to expire on 30 May 2019, would become permanent. In effect the new legislation means home owners can build up to 8 metres projection from the rear wall if building on a detached property (rather than the previous 4 metres) and 6 metres if attached (rather than the previous 3 metres) as Permitted Development. The height restrictions remain at 3 metres height to eaves and 4 metres overall height.

=== Part 3 Class O excluded areas ===
Some local planning authorities resisted the office-to-residential rights and brought in Article 4 Directions so these rights do not apply to certain areas within:

- Greater London: Camden, City of London, Hackney, Islington, Kensington and Chelsea, Lambeth, Newham, Southwark, Tower Hamlets, Wandsworth, Westminster
- Outside Greater London: Ashford, East Hampshire, Manchester, Sevenoaks, Stevenage, Vale of White Horse

In August 2021, the Government replaced Class O Permitted Development Rights with Class MA Permitted Development Rights (see below). The Government announced that local planning authorities that have an existing Article 4 Direction which restricts the change of use from office space to residential space (under the old O class) would remain valid until 31 July 2022. After this date, local planning authorities would need to reinstate an Article 4 Direction to resist the conversion of commercial properties to residential use. Many such as St Albans City and District Council have not reinstated these directions.

=== Class MA Permitted Development Rights ===
In August 2021, the Government introduced a powerful new Permitted Development Right which allows the change of use of commercial properties within Use Class E to residential uses, without the need for full planning permission, subject to complying with some limitations and criteria. The intention of this Permitted Development Right is twofold; to provide some much needed housing on brownfield sites: and to revive England's high streets by bringing vacant units back into use.

The changes have been met with some resistance by Councils and academics, with some concerned that the quality of housing produced is short of standards which would otherwise be allowed.

In March 2024, the Government made changes to further encourage uptake of Class MA Permitted Development Rights. Since the 5th March 2024, buildings no longer need to have been vacant (whereas before they needed to have been vacant for at least 3 months), and there is no limit on the size of properties that can be converted (whereas before the space to be converted needed to be 1,500 sq meters or less).

=== COVID-19 ===
In response to the COVID-19 pandemic, restaurants, cafes and pubs are allowed to provide takeaway food without specific planning permission.

=== "Clarkson's clause" ===
"Clarkson's clause" was an amendment by the Government in 2024 to expand the rights of farmers to change buildings from agricultural use to "flexible commercial" or residential use without planning permission. It was named after Jeremy Clarkson who had high-profile planning disputes with West Oxfordshire District Council on his Clarkson's Farm documentary series.

== Legal and environmental considerations ==
Critics of the General Permitted Development Order (GPDO) have raised several concerns regarding its impact on local communities, the environment, and architectural heritage. One of the main critiques is that the GPDO allows certain developments to bypass the usual planning permission processes, which can result in negative outcomes for the character and quality of local areas. This is particularly evident in conservation areas or areas with significant architectural heritage, where alterations may not be subject to the usual scrutiny.

For example, the GPDO allows for the conversion of offices or other commercial properties to residential use without full planning permission. While this can help address housing shortages, it has been criticized for leading to the loss of important historic buildings and architectural features. The lack of full planning review means that important local characteristics, such as traditional facades, street layouts, and architectural styles, might be compromised for the sake of expedience or economic development.

Environmental concerns are also significant. Developments carried out under the GPDO, especially in rural or sensitive environmental areas, may not undergo the thorough Environmental Impact Assessment (EIA) process that more substantial developments are required to undergo. This can result in harmful environmental impacts that affect local ecosystems, biodiversity, and water management. For instance, new housing or commercial developments in areas near watercourses or wildlife habitats may increase flood risks or disturb wildlife populations without sufficient consideration or mitigation measures.

Local authorities and environmental groups have pointed out that these shortcuts may undermine sustainable development goals, as developments that should ideally have been subject to consultation and detailed environmental reviews instead proceed with limited public input or oversight. This concern is echoed by organisations such as The Guardian, which reported on the growing backlash against certain developments authorized under the GPDO. Furthermore, councils, like those in Dartford, have called for reforms to ensure that local planning authorities retain control over developments that could significantly affect local communities and the environment.

The general argument is that while the GPDO streamlines processes and aids economic development, it should not come at the cost of the long-term sustainability and integrity of local areas, particularly in terms of environmental and cultural preservation.

== See also ==
- Town and country planning in the United Kingdom
