= List of statutory instruments of the United Kingdom, 2015 =

This is an incomplete list of statutory instruments made in the United Kingdom in the year 2015.

- Construction (Design and Management) Regulations 2015 (SI 2015/51)
- Control of Major Accident Hazards Regulations 2015 (SI 2015/483)
- Town and Country Planning (General Permitted Development) (England) Order 2015 (SI 2015/596)
- Energy Efficiency (Private Rented Property) (England and Wales) Regulations 2015 (SI 2015/962), known also as the MEES Regulations ("minimum energy efficiency standard")
- Health and Safety at Work etc. Act 1974 (General Duties of Self-Employed Persons) (Prescribed Undertakings) Regulations 2015 (SI 2015/1583)
- The Packaging (Essential Requirements) Regulations 2015 (SI 2015/1640)
- Modern Slavery Act 2015 (Transparency in Supply Chains) Regulations 2015 (SI 2015/1833)
