= Federal Systems Integration and Management Center =

General Services Administration
- GSA Star Logo

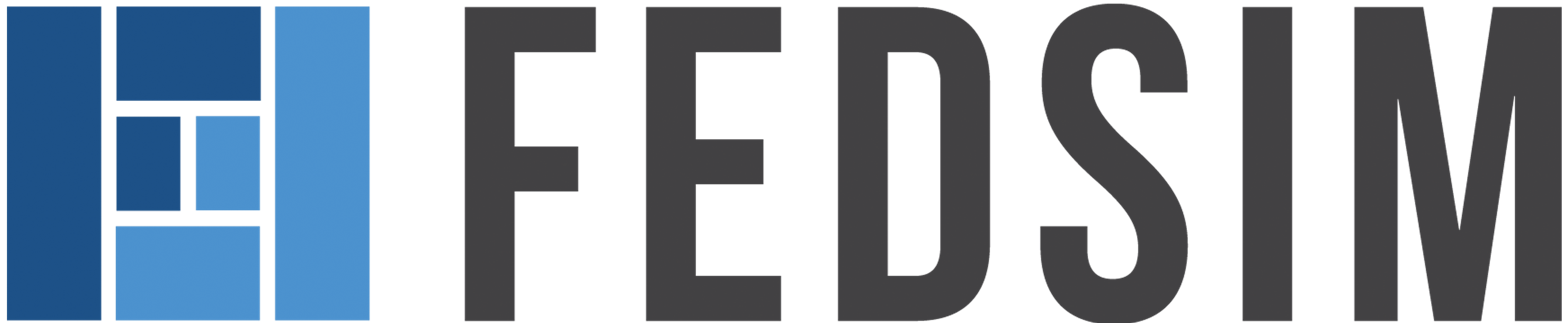

Agency overview
- Formed: February 29, 1972
- Headquarters: 1800 F Street, NW Suite 3100 Washington, DC 20405
- Employees: 246
- Annual budget: $50 million
- Agency executives: Chris Hamm, Director; Pete Burr, Deputy Director; Ken Evans, DOD/Air Force Sector Director; Kristen Knapper, Civilian Sector Director; Mike Marquez, Army/Navy Sector Director; Jim Piché, Homeland Sector Director; Angie Donahoo, Innovation Sector Director
- Website: https://fedsim.gsa.gov/

GSA FEDSIM provides assisted acquisition support for information technology systems and services, and professional services, to other U.S. Government agencies on a fee for service basis. FEDSIM’s business lines include system and network operations and maintenance, development of new applications, purchases of hardwares and softwares, and many other IT goods and services, as well as professional services such as logistics. FEDSIM contracts with large and small private sector companies for these systems and services.

== History ==
In 1972, the U.S. Congress established the Federal Computer Performance Evaluation and Simulation Center at the General Services Administration (GSA) with the goal of providing expertise in computer performance evaluation and modeling to other Government agencies for a fee. GSA delegated the organization to the U.S. Air Force Data Automation Agency as GSA’s executive agent. FEDSIM is funded by fees paid by its customer agencies rather than an appropriated budget. Initially, most FEDSIM projects supported the Air Force, Army, Navy, and other Defense Department agencies. Subsequently, FEDSIM’s clients have come to include all cabinet-level departments, many independent agencies like the Environmental Protection Agency and NASA, small U.S. Government offices, both houses of Congress, and the Judicial Branch. In its early years, FEDSIM supported about a dozen projects with about ten staff members; this has subsequently grown to more than two thousand projects in total, and in 2019 a staff of 246. FEDSIM’s annual revenue has grown from $1 million in the early 1970s to about $20 million in the mid 80’s and over $1 billion since the turn of the millennium. FEDSIM now outsources most of the work and has expanded its business lines from computer performance evaluation to include anything in information technology (IT) plus professional services. FEDSIM's increasing reliance on the private sector is consistent with the current Government policy of contracting out tasks that are not an "Inherently Governmental Function". FEDSIM’s roles have evolved from technical analysis using internal computer performance experts during its first 20 years to award and administration of external contracts, financial management, and project management support for its agency customers during the last 20 years.

The U.S. Navy established the Federal Conversion Support Center around the same time that GSA created FEDSIM. Because of Government regulations, agencies often needed to open their computer acquisitions to a variety of manufacturers; the Conversion Support Center analyzed the cost to convert software from one vendor architecture to another in that situation. The Conversion Support Center transferred to GSA in 1979 and became the core of GSA’s Office of Software Development and Information Technology (OSDIT). Like FEDSIM, OSDIT provided technical experts to other agencies for a fee. In 1985, because of the small number of its Air Force-specific projects, FEDSIM transferred from the Air Force back to GSA. FEDSIM and OSDIT merged in 1990. As outsourcing became more prevalent in U.S. Government IT shops, FEDSIM created, awarded and administered contracts for IT services such as disaster recovery, local area networks, and data center outsourcing. System Integration has been FEDSIM’s single most important business area in the last 20 years. In 1987, FEDSIM was renamed the Federal Systems Integration and Management Center to reflect this change.

FEDSIM projects during the 70s and 80s included designing and optimizing agencies’ national data communications networks; simulation of the performance of a major weapons system; sizing and estimating the cost of creating a new agency data center; purchasing mainframe computers for client agencies; and many others. Large and long-running FEDSIM projects from the 80s and up to the present have included IT support of ADNET, a multi-agency Anti-Drug Network; development of the Internal Revenue Service’s Electronic Filing system E-file; purchase of scientific computers for the National Institutes of Health; program management support to JIDA, the Defense Department’s Joint Improvised-threat Defeat Agency; and multi-faceted system integration projects for the Agency for International Development, the Federal Deposit Insurance Corporation, and others. As of 2015, FEDSIM's largest contracting vehicle, valued at $6 billion, supports the Department of Homeland Security's (DHS's) Continuous Diagnostics and Mitigation program to provide IT Security software and hardware tools and services for continuous protection of civilian agency networks and systems from cyberattack.

FEDSIM Directors
1	Col. Kent Berge	1972 – 1973
2	Col. Richard Lejk	1973 – 1977
3	Col. David Igelman	1977 – 1980
4	Col. Richard Blair	1980 – 1984
5	Col. Ben Gomez	1984 – 1985
6	Col. Charles Conoyer	1985 - 1986
7	Charles Self	1986 - 1996
8	John Ortego	1996 - 1998
9	Tim McCurdy	1998 - 2003
10	Lisa Akers	2003 - 2008
11	Steve Viar	2008 - 2014
12	Chris Hamm	2014 -

FEDSIM’s leaders have gone on to become Assistant Commissioners, Commissioners, directors of the Government’s largest data centers, independent consultants, and in senior leadership positions in the industry.

== Organization ==
FEDSIM is currently organized as a Client Support Center housed within GSA’s Federal Acquisition Service (FAS) - Office of Assisted Acquisition Services. FEDSIM is divided into eight sectors: Civilian, Air Force, DoD, Army, Navy, GCC Presidential, Innovation. Each sector understands the specialized circumstances and regulations applicable to their respective areas. These sectors are subdivided into groups focused on specific organizations within each client so that staff members gain knowledge of their agencies and can develop long-term relationships with the client. This specialization helps FEDSIM deliver value to each client agency.

== Responsibilities ==
FEDSIM provides assisted acquisition services to civilian and military U.S. Government agencies worldwide. FEDSIM specializes in large, complex procurements. It establishes an Integrated Project Team that manages the procurement from requirements gathering to award and through to the end of the performance period. FEDSIM also supports less complex initiatives and offers consulting and advisory services for projects that do not require full-time support. FEDSIM offers innovative, dedicated approaches to acquisition resulting in cost savings and higher quality goods and services.

For example, over the last 10 years, FEDSIM has provided its agency clients with emerging methods and technologies like server virtualization and cloud computing; commercial off-the-shelf COTS software for system development with enterprise products like SAP and in niche areas like insurance underwriting; social media and mobile technologies; and others. FEDSIM has expanded the breadth of its offerings in professional services like logistics or to meet unique needs such as strategic weapon system planning and policy making for the Air Force.

FEDSIM acquisition innovations include the use of performance-based contracting methods and strategic sourcing methods that lower costs by consolidating purchases across many agencies. As U.S. Government IT acquisitions have suffered a resurgence of legal disputes (protests) following a change in the applicable law, FEDSIM has become experienced in protest defense to the point that agencies seek its services for this reason.
