= List of statutory instruments of the United Kingdom, 1948 =

This is an incomplete list of statutory instruments of the United Kingdom in 1948.

1 January 1948 saw the coming into force of the Statutory Instruments Act 1946 which mandated statutory instruments. Prior to this act statutory rules and orders fulfilled a similar function and they formed the secondary legislation of England, Scotland and Wales prior to 1948.

== Statutory instruments ==
=== 1–499 ===
- Statutory Instruments Regulations 1947 (SI 1948/1)
- Statutory Instruments (Confirmatory Powers) Order 1947 (SI 1948/2)
- Statutory Instruments Act 1946 (Commencement) Order 1947 (SI 1948/3)
- East of Christchurch-Tredegar Park Trunk Road Order 1948 (SI 1948/62)
- Palestine Order in Council 1948 (SI 1948/106)
- Treaty of Peace (Bulgaria) Order 1948 (SI 1948/114)
- Treaty of Peace (Finland) Order 1948 (SI 1948/115)
- Treaty of Peace (Hungary) Order 1948 (SI 1948/116)
- Treaty of Peace (Italy) Order 1948 (SI 1948/117)
- Treaty of Peace (Roumania) Order 1948 (SI 1948/118)
- Metropolitan Districts (Names) Order 1973 (SI 1948/137)
- Trading With The Enemy (Enemy Territory Cessation) (Finland) Order 1948 (SI 1948/157)
- Trading With The Enemy (Enemy Territory Cessation) (Bulgaria) Order 1948 (SI 1948/158)
- Trading With The Enemy (Enemy Territory Cessation) (Hungary) Order 1948 (SI 1948/159)
- Trading With The Enemy (Enemy Territory Cessation) (Italy) Order 1948 (SI 1948/160)
- Trading With The Enemy (Enemy Territory Cessation) (Roumania) Order 1948 (SI 1948/161)
- Trading With The Enemy (Enemy Territory Cessation) (Trieste) Order 1948 (SI 1948/162)
- Agriculture (Making of Representations) Regulations 1948 (SI 1948/191)
- Town and Country Planning Act 1947 (Appointed Day) Order 1948 (SI 1948/213)
- Compensation (Defence) Notice of Claim Rules 1948 (SI 1948/307)
- Singapore Colony (Amendment) Order in Council 1948 (SI 1948/341)
- Agriculture Act 1947 (Commencement) (No. 1) Order 1948 (SI 1948/342)
- Northern Ireland (Land Registry) (Appointed Day) Order 1948 (SI 1948/345)
- National Health Service (Scotland) (Superannuation) Regulations 1948 (SI 1948/412)
- Electricity (Allocation of Undertakings to Area Boards) Order 1948 (SI 1948/484)
- Agriculture Act 1947 (Commencement) (No. 2) Order 1948 (SI 1948/491)

=== 500–1499 ===
- Fire Services (Pensionable Employment) Regulations 1948 (SI 1948/581)
- Factories Act 1937 (Extension of Section 46) Regulations 1948 (SI 1948/707)
- Local Government (Scotland) (Glasgow Wards and Councillors) Order 1948 (SI 1948/876)
- Town and Country Planning (Use Classes) Order 1948 (SI 1948/954)
- Town And Country Planning (General Development) Order 1948 (SI 1948/958)
- Termination of Jurisdiction in Palestine (Transitional Provisions) Order in Council 1948 (SI 1948/1003)
- Palestine (Revocations) Order in Council 1948 (SI 1948/1004)
- Agriculture Act 1947 (Commencement) (No. 3) Order 1948 (SI 1948/1005)
- National Insurance (Claims and Payments) Regulations 1948 (SI 1948/1041)
- Trading With The Enemy (Custodian) (Amendment) Order 1948 (SI 1948/1047)
- Town and Country Planning (Enforcement of Restriction of Ribbon Development Acts) Additional Regulations 1948 (SI 1948/1126)
- Local Government Superannuation (England And Scotland) Regulations 1948 (SI 1948/1131)
- Local Government (Scotland) (Edinburgh Wards) Order 1948 (SI 1948/1138)
- Building (Safety, Health & Welfare) Regulations 1948 (SI 1948/1145)
- Trading With The Enemy (Enemy The Trading With The Enemy Territory Cessation) (Albania) Order 1948 (SI 1948/1177)
- National Assistance Act (Appointed Day) (Scotland) Order 1948 (SI 1948/1207)
- National Assistance Act (Appointed Day) Order 1948 (SI 1948/1218)
- Town and Country Planning (Transfer of Property and Officers And Compensation to Officers) Regulations 1948 (SI 1948/1236)
- Stopping Up of Highways (Concurrent Proceedings) Regulations 1948 (SI 1948/1348)
- Civil Aviation (Births, Deaths And Missing Persons) Regulations 1948 (SI 1948/1411)
- National Assistance (Powers of Inspection) Regulations 1948 (SI 1948/1445)
- National Assistance (Compensation) Regulations 1948 (SI 1948/1457)
- Local Government (Compensation) Regulations 1948 (SI 1948/1458)
- National Health Service (Superannuation) (England And Scotland) Regulations 1948 (SI 1948/1483)

=== 1500–1999 ===
- Town and Country Planning (Enforcement of Restriction of Ribbon Development Acts) Regulations 1948 (SI 1948/1520)
- Town and Country Planning (Modification of Mines Act) Regulations 1948 (SI 1948/1522)
- Town and Country Planning (Modification of Mines Act) (Scotland) Regulations 1948 (SI 1948/1526)
- Police Pensions (Scotland) Regulations 1948 (SI 1948/1530)
- Police Pensions Regulations 1948 (SI 1948/1531)
- Clay Works (Welfare) Special Regulations 1948 (SI 1948/1547)
- Extinguishment or Modification of Easements Regulations 1948 (SI 1948/1582)
- Transferred Undertakings (Pensions of Employees Losing Employment) Regulations 1948 (SI 1948/1585)
- Jute (Safety, Health and Welfare) Regulations 1948 (SI 1948/1696)
- Criminal Justice Act 1948 (Date of Commencement) Order 1948 (SI 1948/1840)
- National Insurance (Isle of Man Reciprocal Agreement) Order 1948 (SI 1948/1844)
- Uckfield Water Order 1948 (SI 1948/1906)

=== 2000-2499 ===
- Criminal Justice Act 1948 (Date of Commencement) (No. 2) Order 1948 (SI 1948/2056)
- Agriculture Act 1947 (Commencement) (No. 4) Order 1948 (SI 1948/2057)
- Criminal Justice Act 1948 (Date of Commencement) (No. 3) Order 1948 (SI 1948/2349)
- East Shropshire Water Board Order 1948 (SI 1948/2399)
- National Insurance and Civil Service (Superannuation) Rules 1948 (SI 1948/2434)
- Trading With The Enemy (Enemy Territory Cessation) (Siam) Order 1948 (SI 1948/2484)

=== 2500-2858 ===
- Control of Engagement (Amendment) Order 1948 (SI 1948/2608)
- Isles of Scilly (Local Government) Order 1948 (SI 1948/2733)
- Residential Special Schools and Orphanages (Scotland) Grant Regulations 1948 (SI 1948/2768)
- Industrial Assurance (Premium (Note: The title on the King's Printer's copy incorrectly reads "Permium", but the title assigned by section 6 is spelt correctly.) Receipt Books) Regulations 1948 (SI 1948/2770)
- Greenwich Hospital School (Regulations) (Amendment) Order 1948 (SI 1948/2792)
- Rope, Twine and Net Wages Council (Great Britain) Wages Regulation (No. 2) Order 1948 (SI 1948/2800)
- Airways Corporations Stock Regulations 1948 (SI 1948/2858)

== See also ==
- List of statutory instruments of the United Kingdom
