= Construction (Design and Management) Regulations 2015 =

UK statutory instrument

- Statutory Instrument
- Parliament of the United Kingdom
- Citation: SI 2015/51

Dates
- Made: 22 January 2015
- Laid before Parliament: 29 January 2015
- Commencement: 6 April 2015

Other legislation
- Repeals/revokes: Construction (Design and Management) Regulations 2007
- Made under: Health and Safety at Work etc. Act 1974
- Transposes: Construction Sites Directive (92/57/EEC)

Text of statute as originally enacted

Text of the Construction (Design and Management) Regulations 2015 as in force today (including any amendments) within the United Kingdom, from legislation.gov.uk.

The Construction (Design and Management) Regulations 2015 (SI 2015/51), also known as CDM Regulations or CDM 2015, which came into force on 6 April 2015, are regulations governing the way construction projects of all sizes and types are planned in the UK. Replacing the Construction (Design and Management) Regulations 2007 (SI 2007/320), CDM 2015 is the latest update to the regulations that aim to improve the overall health, safety and welfare of those working in construction. These regulations offer a very broad definition of what construction works are: everyone involved in a construction project, including home maintenance and improvement works, has responsibility for health and safety.

== Regulation ==
Statistics published by Osborne Clarke claim up to 85% of businesses affected by the regulations do not consider themselves to be in the construction industry. CDM 2015 places legal duties on all involved in a construction project; duties which are enforceable by criminal law.

CDM 2015 aims to ensure health and safety issues are appropriately considered during the development of construction projects. The overall goal is to reduce the risk of harm to those who have to build, use and maintain structures. The regulations were originally introduced in 1994 in compliance with European Directive 92/57/EEC and were previously revised in the CDM Regulations 2007.

CDM Regulations 2015 define responsibilities according to particular roles from client, designer and contractor. The main changes from the CDM Regulations 2007 are:

- The regulations now apply to all clients of construction projects, whether or not a person is acting in the course or furtherance of a business.
- Pre-construction archaeological investigations are not included within the scope of the definition of construction work.
- The role of CDM coordinator has been removed and various duties have been recast including client duties and general duties.
- A client is required to appoint a principal designer as well as a principal contractor in any project where there is, or it is reasonably foreseeable that there will be, more than one contractor working on the project.
- Under the 2007 Regulations appointments for similar roles were required for notifiable projects. The duty to notify now lies with a client and the threshold for notification is raised.

The scope of what constitutes ‘construction work’ has been increased. “Construction work” now means the carrying out of any building, civil engineering or engineering construction work and includes building temporary structures used for events, television, film and entertainment productions. It is the responsibility of those who procure such ‘works’ to be familiar with their obligations; for example, under CDM 2015 a television producer is now in the construction industry. In situations where work is planned to last longer than 30 working days, with more than 20 workers working on site at the same time during any part of the project, or if the project exceeds 500 person days in total, the HSE must be notified of the project by the client.

The principal implication of CDM 2015 is that the person or business for whom the construction services are carried out, ‘the client’, is accountable for health, safety and welfare on the project. Property owners appointing professionals to perform maintenance work will face additional costs from designers and contractors for this added work and responsibility. It has been estimated that a small project, completed in less time than the 30-day threshold, could add 10-20 per cent to a project’s cost.
