= Construction (Design and Management) Regulations 2007 =

UK regulations

- Statutory Instrument
- Parliament of the United Kingdom
- Citation: SI 2007/320

Dates
- Made: 7 February 2007
- Laid before Parliament: 15 February 2007
- Commencement: 6 April 2007
Other legislation
Repeals/revokes	Construction (Design and Management) Regulations 1994; Construction (Health, Safety and Welfare) Regulations 1996; Construction (Design and Management) (Amendment) Regulations 2000
Made under	Health and Safety at Work etc. Act 1974
Transposes	Directive 92/57/EEC
Revoked by	Construction (Design and Management) Regulations 2015

Status: Revoked

Text of statute as originally enacted

The Construction (Design and Management) Regulations 2007 (SI 2007/320), also known as CDM Regulations or CDM 2007, previously defined legal duties for the safe operation of UK construction sites. They were superseded by the Construction (Design and Management) Regulations 2015. The regulations placed specific duties on clients, designers and contractors, to plan their approach to health and safety. They applied throughout construction projects, from inception to final demolition and removal.

They were introduced by the Health and Safety Executive's Construction Division to:

- Improve project planning and management;
- Assign appropriate personnel to manage on-site risks;
- Manage health and safety;
- Discourage bureaucracy.

== History ==
CDM 2007 was a result of an EU Directive 92/57/EEC (OJ L245, 26.8.92), the 'Construction Sites Directive'. They came into force on 6 April 2007, and replaced a 1994 predecessor as amended in 2000 and 1996 Health and Safety regulations. They were superseded by the Construction (Design and Management) Regulations 2015, which was effective from 6 April 2015, with transitional arrangements for existing construction projects to comply with the 2007 regulations until October 2015.

== Organization ==
The regulations were divided into five parts:

- Interpretation and application
- General management duties that applied to all construction projects
- Additional management duties that applied to notifiable projects
- Physical safeguards that must be provided to prevent danger
- Civil liability and transitional provisions that applied during the period when the regulations come into force, and amendments and revocations of other legislation

CDM 2007 is applied to all construction and covers construction activities such as building, civil engineering, engineering construction work, demolition, site preparation and site clearance.

== Approved Code of Practice 2007 (ACoP) ==
The HSE's Approved Code of Practice (ACoP) gives practical advice on how to comply with the law. It states that following the advice given complies with CDM regulations. Violation of the health and safety law/code carries legal consequences.

ACoP came into force in April 2007. This edition completely re-wrote the original and revised ACoP's that complied with CDM 1994.

== Notifiable projects ==
Projects are classified as ‘notifiable’ if the construction work phase is expected to last longer than 30 working days and have more than 20 workers working at the same time at any point on the project, or to exceed 500 person days. Under the CDM regulation, the client appoints a competent Principal Contractor and CDM coordinator, who notifies the Health and Safety Executive (HSE) by using Form 10 (F10). Failure to do so means the client must take the duties of Principal Contractor and CDM coordinator assigned to the parties under CDM 2007.

Non-notifiable projects are those that are likely to take less than 30 days of construction time. Although there is no legal requirement for a formal appointment of a Principal Contractor or CDM coordinator or a construction phase plan for non-notifiable projects, regulation does require cooperation and coordination between all members of the project team.

"CDM coordinator" is the new title for the Planning Supervisor under CDM 1994, with increased duties and responsibilities.

Multiple plan documents must be prepared.

- Construction Phase Plan – let the building contract, appoint contractor, issue production information, arrange site hand-over, and review contractor's proposals
- Construction to Practical Completion – administer the building contract and provide contractor with further information as necessary
- After Practical Completion – administer the building contract after practical completion, resolve defects and make final inspections)
- Health and Safety File

The importance of this phase is in the inspection of expected performance standards to ensure compliance). Additional duties are also placed on the Client, Designers and Contractors.

== Duty holders ==
Parties with specific duties under the regulations are the client, designer, principal contractor, other contractors, and a new duty holder introduced by the regulations, the ‘CDM coordinator'.

Each of these duty holders, apart from the client, must be "competent" to act in the project.

=== Client ===
The client is the party for whom the project is carried out. The client controls the duration, budget and appointment of other parties. As such they play a key role in the promotion of a systematic approach to health and safety management in construction. The client's legal duties are:

- Verify the competence and resources of all organisations and internal teams on the project (e.g., principal contractor, CDM coordinator, designers and contractors).
- Ensure suitable management arrangements.
- Ensure sufficient time and resources are allowed for all stages including site setup.
- With CDM coordinator, compile and provide pre-construction information to designers and contractors.
- Ensure cooperation and coordination between client and contractor staff.

On notifiable projects the client's additional duties are to:

- Select and appoint a competent and resourced CDM coordinator and principal contractor.
- Verify the sufficiency of the construction phase plan prior to construction commencement.
- Verify that suitable welfare facilities are in place prior to construction commencement and cooperate with the principal contractor to provide a suitable welfare facility
- Compile and retain up to date health and safety files from the CDM coordinator. Provide access to others for health and safety purposes.

Often, clients have little knowledge of managing a construction project. Clients without construction expertise rely on the CDM coordinator's advice on how best to meet their duties. The CDM coordinator needs the client's support and input to work effectively. The client remains responsible for ensuring client duties are met. Domestic clients having work done on a property they intend to live in are exempt from CDM 2007.

=== CDM coordinator ===
A CDM coordinator is required only on notifiable projects. Primary roles and duties are to provide the client with an advisor on construction health and safety risk management matters and to ensure compliance with CDM 2007. The legal duties of a CDM coordinator under CDM 2007 are:

- Notify notifiable projects to the Health & Safety Executive.
- Advise and assist the client with all of their duties.

=== Designers ===
In CDM 2007, ‘designer’ covers persons or organisations who prepare drawings, design details or specify a particular construction method or material. Therefore, by default anyone involved is a potential designer, including the client, architect, engineers, surveyors, service designers, project managers, landscape architects, contractors, interior designers and shop fitters and anyone purchasing materials without a detailed specification.

Designers can identify and eliminate hazards and reduce hazard risks where elimination is not possible. Designer responsibilities extend beyond the construction phase. They must consider the health and safety of those who maintain, repair, clean, refurbish, and eventually remove or demolish the structure, as well as that of workplace users. Where significant risks remain, designers must ensure that the CDM coordinator, other designers and contractors are aware of these risks.

Designers also have duties under other legislation.

The legal duties of a designer under CDM 2007 are to:

- Ensure that the client is aware of the client's duties prior to commencing design work.
- Ensure that personnel allocated to their design team from internal or external resources are competent and adequately resourced.
- Eliminate or reduce health and safety risks to constructors, users, maintainers, repairers, commissioners, testers, cleaners, demolishers etc.
- Work with other designers, including temporary works designers, to ensure adequate design coordination.
- Provide information about risks that cannot be satisfactorily addressed to the client, other designers and contractors.

On notifiable projects designers' additional duties are to:

- Verify that the project has been notified and that the CDM coordinator has been appointed.
- Cooperate with the CDM coordinator
- Provide information requested by the CDM coordinator for the health and safety file.

=== Principal Contractor ===
The principal contractor develops a health and safety plan from the pre-construction information provided by the CDM coordinator and by ensuring that the plan is followed. The principal contractor must be a licensed contractor. A contractor performs/manages construction work and is formally appointed by the client. The principal contractor must also comply with the contractor's duties (below). The principal contractor has prime responsibility for safety and health during the construction phase only on notifiable projects. Duties are to:

- Demonstrate competence and adequacy of resources to perform required duties.
- Verify competence and resources allocation of any sub-contractors.
- Prepare, develop, communicate, implement and amend the construction phase plan.
- Plan and manage construction processes.
- Manage subcontractors.
- Ensure provision of adequate welfare facilities, prevent unauthorised site access, prepare and enforce site rules.
- Supply key documents to subcontractors such as health and safety file information, site surveys, designers' information, risk assessments, and the construction phase plan.
- Inform subcontractors of their mobilisation time.
- Ensure the workforce is consulted on health and safety matters and provided with suitable information and training.
- Liaise with the CDM coordinator for any design undertaken during the construction phase.
- Provide information for the health and safety file.
- Display the project notification on the site.

=== Contractors ===
Contractor duties are to:

- Ensure that workers under their control are safe.
- Ensure that any contractor whom they engage to work is with the permission of the Estates project manager/supervisor and are informed of the amount of time allowed to prepare before starting work.
- Provide workers under their control any necessary information, including about relevant aspects of other contractors' work that they need to work safely, to report problems or to respond appropriately in an emergency.
- Coordinate their work with others.
- Ensure adequate welfare facilities for their workers.

In addition, for notifiable projects:

- Check that the client is aware of their duties, check that a CDM coordinator has been appointed and ensure that HSE has been notified before the work starts.
- Cooperate with the principal contractor in planning and managing work.
- Provide details to the principal contractor of contractors they engage.
- Provide any information needed for the health and safety file.
- Inform the principal contractor of any problems.
- Inform the principal contractor of reportable accidents, disease and dangerous events.

=== Workers ===
Workers behave as safely as possible and not endanger others. Their duties are to:

- Ensure they only carry out tasks at which they are competent.
- Report risks and hazards to the contractor.
- Coordinate work to ensure the health and safety of themselves and others.
- Follow site health and safety rules and procedures.

== Statutory documents ==
Mandatory documents for a CDM project, include project notification, pre-construction information, construction phase plan and health and safety plan. Pre-construction information is required for all projects, while some form of the other documents must be produced for both notifiable and non-notifiable projects. Project notification is only needed for notifiable projects. The Construction Phase Plan is required on notifiable projects, but something similar is required on other projects to provide for effective health and safety management. The Health and Safety File must be produced by the CDM coordinator on notifiable projects. Existing Health and Safety files must be modified files for structures undergoing modifications. The client must establish related procedures. Even when a Health and Safety File is not required, as-built and operational and maintenance information are required.

=== Project notification (Form 10) ===
The regulations require the CDM coordinator to notify the local HSE office of all projects expected to last more than 30 working days and all work of shorter duration that involves more than 500 person-shifts. The initial notification happens as soon as possible after appointment of the CDM coordinator. Further notifications are required by project changes that affects the notification, such as the subsequent appointment of the principal contractor. Additional notifications are not required should designers and contractors change. This notification may be performed using the HSE Form 10(rev) or by other means, including electronic, providing it contains the information specified by Schedule 1 of CDM2007, which consists of:

- Date of forwarding and exact site address
- A brief project description
- Contact details of the client, CDM coordinator and principal contractor
- Planned construction start date planned
- Time allowed for planning and preparation
- Planned construction duration
- Estimated maximum number of on-site workers
- Planned number of contractors
- Name and address of existing designers and contractors
- A client declaration attesting knowledge of client duties

=== Pre-construction information ===
Pre-construction information (PCI) provides information for planning and for the construction phase plan. The 'pre-construction information' is information regarding the project, site and other relevant issues required by designers and contractors. The pre-construction information may include indexed drawings, reports, surveys, etc., either in digital or hard copy.

=== Construction phase plan ===
Construction phase plans (CPP or CPHP) must contain health and safety management systems and arrangements, and risk assessments and method statements for initial work activities. On non-notifiable projects involving demolition or high risk levels, a written plan, approximating the construction phase plan is recommended. The client must establish the need for this, with assistance from designers. The CDM ACoP, Appendix 3 contains a listing of required items.

==== Health and safety file ====
A health and safety file (HSF) is required only on notifiable projects. However, if a health and safety file exists for a structure involved in a non-notifiable project, this file must be updated. The health and safety file contains information needed to allow safe construction. Scope, structure and format must be agreed between the client and the CDM coordinator at the outset. The client takes charge of the file upon project completion. On notifiable projects, contractors must promptly provide relevant information to the principal contractor. The pre-construction information covers contents, timing and format.

===== File content =====
- Brief description of the structural / building work
- List of residual hazards and how they were addressed, such as information concerning asbestos, contaminated land, water bearing strata, buried services etc.
- Description of the structural principles, such as bracing, sources of substantial stored energy *including pre- or post-tensioned members) and safe working loads for floors and roofs
- List of hazards associated with materials, such as hazardous substances, lead paint and special coatings
- Information regarding the removal or dismantling of installed plant and equipment (for example lifting arrangements)
- Information about any cleaning/maintenance equipment
- Nature, location, and markings of significant services, including fire-fighting services
- Information and as-built drawings of the structures, plant and equipment, such as safe access to service voids and fire exits

== Key consultation results ==
Public review generated 1427 responses, among the highest of any consultation undertaken by HSE. The main findings were:

- Broad support from industry stakeholders, with concerns about effectiveness, particularly with SMEs;
- The proposed replacement of the CDM coordinator role with that of the principal designer remains appropriate;
- Respondents requested a new, shorter signposting ACOP, complemented by the HSE and joint HSE-industry guidance;
- HSE proposed to revisit the section on competence to improve clarity, but claimed that the new competence requirements was appropriate.
