= Planning Portal =

British government website

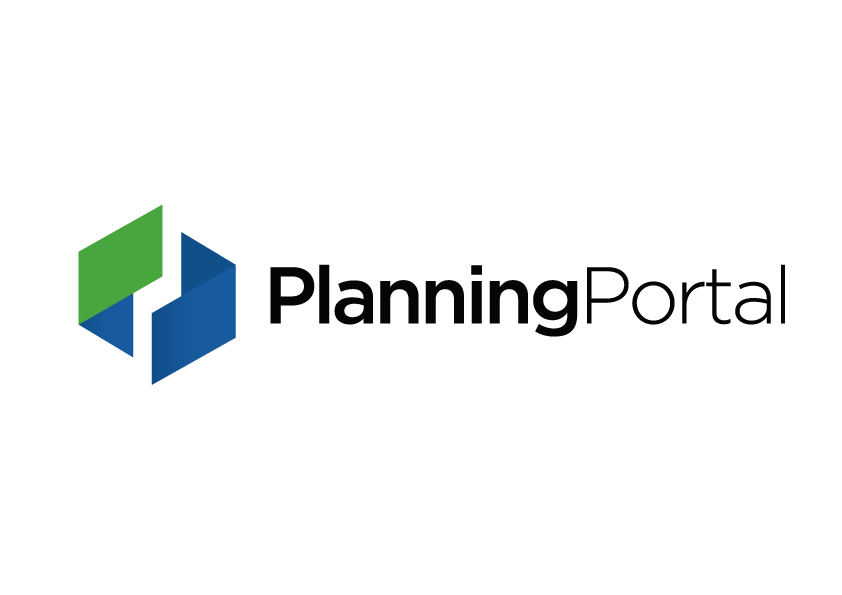
- Available in: English and Welsh
- Owner: PortalPlanQuest ltd
- Commercial: yes
- Registration: Optional
- Launched: 2002
- Current status: online
- Content license: Crown Copyright and Click-use licence

The Planning Portal is a website for submitting planning applications and finding planning guidance. It is owned by TerraQuest Solutions Limited. Planning Portal was established by UK Government in 2002 to allow planning applications in England and Wales to be processed electronically. It later added guidance and information content, interactive guides, an application service for Building Regulations approval and the ability to purchase site location plans.

The Planning Portal provides a conduit between those submitting planning applications (such as architects) and the local planning authority who will determine the application.

The business became PortalPlanQuest in March 2015 when it was privatised and is now a joint venture between the UK Government (Department for Levelling Up, Housing & Communities) and TerraQuest Solutions. The CEO of TerraQuest is Geoffrey Keal.
