= Planning use classes in Wales =

Framework which determines use of a property in Wales

Planning use classes are the legal framework which determines what a particular property may be used for by its lawful occupants. Planning is a policy area devolved in Wales. As of June 2026, the use classes in Wales are:

- A1 - Shops
- A2 - Financial and professional services
- A3 - Food and drink
- B1 - Business
- B2 - General industrial
- B8 - Storage or distribution
- C1 - Hotels
- C2 - Residential institutions
- C3 - Dwellinghouses
- C4 - Houses in multiple occupation
- D1 - Non-residential institutions
- D2 - Assembly and leisure
- Unique use - does not fall within any use class

== See also ==
- Planning use classes in England
