= Railways and Transport Safety Act 2003 =

Act of the Parliament of the United Kingdom

Railways and Transport Safety Act 2003 (Note: Section 122.)
- Act of Parliament
- Parliament of the United Kingdom
- Long title: An Act to make provision about railways, including tramways; to make provision about transport safety; and for connected purposes.
- Citation: 2003 c. 20
- Territorial extent: United Kingdom (Note: Section 121.)

Dates
- Royal assent: 10 July 2003
- Commencement: Various (Note: Section 120.)
Other legislation
| Amends | Transport Act 1962; Water Industry Act 1991; Water Resources Act 1991; Police Act 1996; Terrorism Act 2000; Anti-terrorism, Crime and Security Act 2001 |
| Amended by | Railways Act 2005; Police and Justice Act 2006; Criminal Justice and Immigration Act 2008; Postal Services Act 2011; Police Reform and Social Responsibility Act 2011; Infrastructure Act 2015; Deregulation Act 2015; Policing and Crime Act 2017; Sentencing Act 2020 |

Status: Amended

Text of statute as originally enacted

Revised text of statute as amended

The Railways and Transport Safety Act 2003 (c. 20) is an act of the Parliament of the United Kingdom.

== Provisions ==
The purposes of the act include:

- the creation of the Rail Accident Investigation Branch
- the replacement of the Rail Regulator by an independent regulator funded by the government rather than the rail industry, the Office of Rail Regulation.
- the creation of a police authority for the British Transport Police (BTP)
- allowing the BTP to recruit police community support officers (PCSO) under the Police Reform Act 2002 which previously only extended to territorial police forces
- giving the BTP "statutory authority over the railway"
- the introduction of alcohol limits on the crews of water-borne vessels and aircraft in line with those already existing for railway staff
- other miscellaneous matters affecting railway, air and road transport

The act facilitated the transfer of the London Underground to Transport for London.

== Extent ==
The Act extends to the whole United Kingdom but with exceptions for Scotland, Wales and Northern Ireland

== Repeals and amendments ==
Schedule 8 makes a number of amendments to other acts but does not repeal any acts entirely.

== See also ==
- Railways Act
