= Water Act 2003 =

Act of the Parliament of the United Kingdom

Water Act 2003 (Note: Section 105(1).)
- Act of Parliament
- Parliament of the United Kingdom
- Long title: An Act to amend the Water Resources Act 1991 and the Water Industry Act 1991; to make provision with respect to compensation under section 61 of the Water Resources Act 1991; to provide for the establishment and functions of the Water Services Regulation Authority and the Consumer Council for Water, and for the abolition of the office of Director General of Water Services; to make provision in connection with land drainage and flood defence; to amend the Reservoirs Act 1975; to make provision about contaminated land so far as it relates to the pollution of controlled waters; to confer on the Coal Authority functions in relation to the discharge of water from coal mines; to extend the functions of the Environment Agency in relation to the Rivers Esk, Sark and Tweed and their tributaries so far as they are in England; to repeal section 1 of the Metropolis Water Act 1852; and for connected purposes.
- Citation: 2003 c. 37
- Territorial extent: England and Wales; Scotland (in part); Northern Ireland (in part); (Note: Section 105(7)–(14))

Dates
- Royal assent: 20 November 2003
- Commencement: Various (Note: Section 105(3)–(6))
Other legislation
Amends	Metropolis Water Act 1852; Reservoirs Act 1975; House of Commons Disqualification Act 1975; Airports Act 1986; Company Directors Disqualification Act 1986; Water Resources Act 1991; Water Industry Act 1991; Land Drainage Act 1991; Water Consolidation (Consequential Provisions) Act 1991; Coal Industry Act 1994
Amended by	Natural Environment and Rural Communities Act 2006; Postal Services Act 2011; Environment Act 2021

Status: Amended

Text of statute as originally enacted

Revised text of statute as amended

The Water Act 2003 (c. 37) is an act of the Parliament of the United Kingdom.

The report Taking Water Responsibly, published in March 1999, was a precursor of this act.

== Provisions ==
The act gave strategic health authorities (in England) and the National Assembly for Wales (in Wales) the ability to require water fluoridation in their areas.

The act required boreholes to be accompanied by an abstraction license only if it drew more than 20 cubic metres of water.

The publication of water resource management plans was a statutory requirement of the act, with the first statutory plans being published in June 2009.

The act placed a duty on the industry and the government to promote efficiency.

=== Section 105 - Interpretation, commencement, short title, and extent ===
The following orders have been made under section 105:

- The Water Act 2003 (Commencement No. 1 and Transitional Provisions) Order 2004 (SI 2004/641) (C. 24)
- The Water Act 2003 (Commencement No. 2, Transitional Provisions and Savings) Order 2004 (SI 2004/2528) (C. 106)
- The Water Act 2003 (Commencement No. 3) (England) Order 2005 (SI 2005/344) (C. 12)
- The Water Act 2003 (Commencement No. 4, Transitional Provisions and Savings) Order 2005 (SI 2005/968) (C. 43)
- The Water Act 2003 (Commencement No. 5, Transitional Provisions and Savings) Order 2005 (SI 2005/2714) (C. 109)
- The Water Act 2003 (Commencement No. 6, Transitional Provisions and Savings) Order 2006 (SI 2006/984) (C. 30)
- The Water Act 2003 (Commencement No. 7 and Transitional Provisions) Order 2007 (SI 2007/1021) (C. 42)
- The Water Act 2003 (Commencement No. 8) Order 2008 (SI 2008/1922) (C. 37)
- The Water Act 2003 (Commencement No. 9 and Saving Provisions) (England) Order 2009 (SI 2009/359) (C. 17)
- The Water Act 2003 (Commencement No. 10) Order 2010 (SI 2010/975) (C. 65)
- The Water Act 2003 (Commencement No. 11) Order 2012 (SI 2012/264) (C. 8)
- The Water Act 2003 (Commencement No. 12) Order 2017 (SI 2017/1043) (C. 96)
- The Water Act 2003 (Commencement) (Wales) Order 2004 (SI 2004/910) (W. 93) (C. 39)
- The Water Act 2003 (Commencement No. 2) (Wales) Order 2004 (SI 2004/2916) (W. 255) (C. 120)
- The Water Act 2003 (Commencement No. 3) (Wales) Order 2012 (SI 2012/284) (W. 48) (C. 9)
- The Water Act 2003 (Commencement No. 4) (Wales) Order 2017 (SI 2017/88) (W. 32) (C. 9)
