= List of acts of the Parliament of the United Kingdom from 1991 =

This is a list of acts of the Parliament of the United Kingdom passed in 1991.

Acts passed since 1963 are cited by calendar year, as opposed to the convention used for earlier acts of citing the regnal year(s) in which the relevant parliamentary session was held. Each act passed in a respective year is given a chapter number (abbreviated "c."), denoted by Arabic numerals in the case of public general acts, lowercase Roman numerals in the case of local acts, or italicised Arabic numerals in the case of personal acts. These run as separate series.

92 acts of Parliament were passed in 1991: 69 public general acts and 23 local acts.

indicates that an act has been transcribed on Wikisource, indicates that an act is available to view at legislation.gov.uk, and indicates the location of the original act in the Parliamentary Archives.

== Public general acts ==
Short title	Citation	Royal assent
Long title
Development Board for Rural Wales Act 1991 (repealed)	1991 c. 1	12 February 1991
An Act to increase the financial limit which applies by virtue of section 12 of the Development of Rural Wales Act 1976 (Note: Development of Rural Wales Act 1976 (c. 75)) to sums borrowed by the Development Board for Rural Wales, sums paid by the Secretary of State to the Board and sums issued by the Treasury in pursuance of guarantees on loans to the Board. (Repealed by Government of Wales Act 1998 (c. 38))
Caravans (Standard Community Charge and Rating) Act 1991	1991 c. 2	12 February 1991
An Act to make provision with respect to the liability to standard community charges and non-domestic rates in respect of certain caravans and their pitches.
Statutory Sick Pay Act 1991	1991 c. 3	12 February 1991
An Act to reduce the amount of statutory sick pay which employers are entitled to recover; to repeal section 9(1A) of the Social Security and Housing Benefits Act 1982; (Note: Social Security and Housing Benefits Act 1982 (c. 24)) and for purposes connected therewith.
Namibia Act 1991	1991 c. 4	28 February 1991
An Act to make provision in connection with the admission of Namibia as a member of the Commonwealth.
Ministerial and other Pensions and Salaries Act 1991	1991 c. 5	28 February 1991
An Act to make new provision with respect to the pensions payable to or in respect of persons who have held the office of Prime Minister and First Lord of the Treasury, Speaker of the House of Commons or Lord Chancellor; to relate the salary of the Lord Chancellor to that of the Lord Chief Justice; to provide for the making of grants to persons ceasing to hold ministerial and certain other offices and the payment of an allowance to persons holding those offices who are members of the House of Lords; to make new provision for determining the Exchequer contributions to the Parliamentary Contributory Pension Fund; and to extend the purposes for which payments can be made under section 4(1) of the House of Commons Members' Fund Act 1948. (Note: House of Commons Members' Fund Act 1948 (11 & 12 Geo. 6. c. 36))
Census (Confidentiality) Act 1991	1991 c. 6	7 March 1991
An Act to make provision with respect to the unlawful disclosure of information acquired in connection with the discharge of functions under the Census Act 1920; (Note: Census Act 1920 (10 & 11 Geo. 5. c. 41)) and for connected purposes.
Consolidated Fund Act 1991 (repealed)	1991 c. 7	21 March 1991
An Act to apply certain sums out of the Consolidated Fund to the service of the years ending on 31st March 1990, 1991 and 1992. (Repealed by Appropriation Act 1993 (c. 33))
Community Charges (Substitute Setting) Act 1991 (repealed)	1991 c. 8	21 March 1991
An Act to amend the law about setting substitute personal community charges under section 35 of the Local Government Finance Act 1988. (Note: Local Government Finance Act 1988 (c. 41)) (Repealed by Local Government Finance Act 1992 (c. 14))
Community Charges (General Reduction) Act 1991 (repealed)	1991 c. 9	28 March 1991
An Act to make provision for, and in connection with, a reduction in the amounts of community charges for the financial year beginning on 1st April 1991 and the payment of grants to charging authorities in England and Wales and local authorities in Scotland. (Repealed by Statute Law (Repeals) Act 2004 (c. 14))
Consolidated Fund (No. 2) Act 1991 (repealed)	1991 c. 10	9 May 1991
An Act to apply certain sums out of the Consolidated Fund to the service of the year ending on 31st March 1992. (Repealed by Appropriation Act 1993 (c. 33))
Representation of the People Act 1991	1991 c. 11	9 May 1991
An Act to make provision with respect to charges for returning officers' services rendered, and expenses incurred, for or in connection with a parliamentary election.
Civil Jurisdiction and Judgments Act 1991	1991 c. 12	9 May 1991
An Act to give effect to the Convention on jurisdiction and the enforcement of judgments in civil and commercial matters, including the Protocols annexed thereto, opened for signature at Lugano on 16th September 1988; and for purposes connected therewith.
War Crimes Act 1991	1991 c. 13	9 May 1991
An Act to confer jurisdiction on United Kingdom courts in respect of certain grave violations of the laws and customs of war committed in German-held territory during the Second World War; and for connected purposes.
Motor Vehicles (Safety Equipment for Children) Act 1991	1991 c. 14	27 June 1991
An Act to make provision in relation to safety equipment for children in motor vehicles.
Local Government Finance (Publicity for Auditors' Reports) Act 1991 (repealed)	1991 c. 15	27 June 1991
An Act to make further provision with respect to the furnishing or making of copies, and inspection, of auditors' immediate reports made under section 15(3) of the Local Government Finance Act 1982. (Note: Local Government Finance Act 1982 (c. 32)) (Repealed by Audit Commission Act 1998 (c. 18))
Oversea Superannuation Act 1991 or the Overseas Superannuation Act 1991	1991 c. 16	27 June 1991
An Act to authorise the making of schemes under section 2 of the Overseas Pensions Act 1973 (Note: Overseas Pensions Act 1973 (c. 21)) for the provision of pensions, allowances and gratuities to or in respect of persons who have contributed to the Oversea Superannuation Scheme; to provide for that Scheme and the regulations under it to have effect as if they together constituted a scheme made under that section; and for purposes connected therewith.
Maintenance Enforcement Act 1991	1991 c. 17	27 June 1991
An Act to make provision as to the methods of payment, and the variation of the methods of payment, under maintenance orders made by the High Court and county courts; to re-enact with modifications certain provisions relating to the making and variation of orders requiring money to be paid periodically; to make further provision as to the making, variation and enforcement by magistrates' courts of maintenance orders; to make further provision about proceedings by clerks of magistrates' courts in relation to arrears under certain orders requiring money to be paid periodically; to make further provision as to maintenance orders registered in, or confirmed by, magistrates' courts or registered in the High Court; to extend the power to make attachment of earnings orders in the case of maintenance orders; to amend section 10 of the Courts and Legal Services Act 1990; (Note: Courts and Legal Services Act 1990 (c. 41)) and for connected purposes.
Crofter Forestry (Scotland) Act 1991 (repealed)	1991 c. 18	27 June 1991
An Act to extend the powers of grazings committees in relation to the use of crofting land in Scotland for forestry purposes; and to make grazings committees eligible for certain grants in respect of such use. (Repealed by Crofters (Scotland) Act 1993 (c. 44))
Football (Offences) Act 1991	1991 c. 19	27 June 1991
An Act to make further provision with respect to disorderly conduct by persons attending football matches; and for connected purposes.
Registered Homes (Amendment) Act 1991	1991 c. 20	27 June 1991
An Act to amend Part I of the Registered Homes Act 1984 (Note: Registered Homes Act 1984 (c. 23)) so as to require registration in respect of small residential care homes; and for connected purposes.
Disability Living Allowance and Disability Working Allowance Act 1991	1991 c. 21	27 June 1991
An Act to introduce as social security benefits disability living allowance and disability working allowance; and for connected purposes.
New Roads and Street Works Act 1991	1991 c. 22	27 June 1991
An Act to amend the law relating to roads so as to enable new roads to be provided by new means; to make new provision with respect to street works and, in Scotland, road works; and for connected purposes.
Children and Young Persons (Protection from Tobacco) Act 1991	1991 c. 23	27 June 1991
An Act to increase the penalties for the sale of tobacco to persons under the age of 16 years; to make other amendments of section 7 of the Children and Young Persons Act 1933 (Note: Children and Young Persons Act 1933 (23 & 24 Geo. 5. c. 12)) and section 18 of the Children and Young Persons (Scotland) Act 1937; (Note: Children and Young Persons (Scotland) Act 1937 (1 Edw. 8 & 1 Geo. 6. c. 37)) to prohibit the sale of unpackaged cigarettes; to require the publication of warning statements in retail premises and on vending machines; to make provision with respect to enforcement action by local authorities relating to offences connected with the sale of tobacco and to other matters; and for connected purposes.
Northern Ireland (Emergency Provisions) Act 1991 (repealed)	1991 c. 24	27 June 1991
An Act to re-enact, with amendments, the Northern Ireland (Emergency Provisions) Act 1978, (Note: Northern Ireland (Emergency Provisions) Act 1978 (c. 5)) the Northern Ireland (Emergency Provisions) Act 1987 (Note: Northern Ireland (Emergency Provisions) Act 1987 (c. 30)) and Part VI of the Prevention of Terrorism (Temporary Provisions) Act 1989; (Note: Prevention of Terrorism (Temporary Provisions) Act 1989 (c. 4)) and to make further provision for the preservation of the peace and the maintenance of order in Northern Ireland. (Repealed by Northern Ireland (Emergency Provisions) Act 1996 (c. 22))
Criminal Procedure (Insanity and Unfitness to Plead) Act 1991	1991 c. 25	27 June 1991
An Act to amend the law relating to the special verdict and unfitness to plead; to increase the powers of courts in the event of defendants being found to be insane or unfit to plead; and to provide for a trial of the facts in the cases of defendants found to be unfit to plead.
Road Traffic (Temporary Restrictions) Act 1991	1991 c. 26	27 June 1991
An Act to make new provision in place of sections 14 and 15 of the Road Traffic Regulation Act 1984; (Note: Road Traffic Regulation Act 1984 (c. 27)) and for connected purposes.
Radioactive Material (Road Transport) Act 1991	1991 c. 27	27 June 1991
An Act to make new provision with respect to the transport of radioactive material by road; to repeal section 5(2) of the Radioactive Substances Act 1948; (Note: Radioactive Substances Act 1948 (11 & 12 Geo. 6. c. 37)) and for connected purposes.
Natural Heritage (Scotland) Act 1991	1991 c. 28	27 June 1991
An Act to establish Scottish Natural Heritage; to make provision as to the management of water resources in Scotland; and for connected purposes.
Property Misdescriptions Act 1991	1991 c. 29	27 June 1991
An Act to prohibit the making of false or misleading statements about property matters in the course of estate agency business and property development business.
Welfare of Animals at Slaughter Act 1991	1991 c. 30	27 June 1991
An Act to make further provision for the welfare of animals at slaughter.
Finance Act 1991	1991 c. 31	25 July 1991
An Act to grant certain duties, to alter other duties, and to amend the law relating to the National Debt and the Public Revenue, and to make further provision in connection with Finance.
Appropriation Act 1991 (repealed)	1991 c. 32	25 July 1991
An Act to apply a sum out of the Consolidated Fund to the service of the year ending on 31st March 1992, to appropriate the supplies granted in this Session of Parliament, and to repeal certain Consolidated Fund and Appropriation Acts. (Repealed by Appropriation Act 1993 (c. 33))
Agriculture and Forestry (Financial Provisions) Act 1991	1991 c. 33	25 July 1991
An Act to repeal the statutory provisions relating to the Agricultural Mortgage Corporation and the Scottish Agricultural Securities Corporation; to provide for the recovery of the cost of government supervision of Community livestock carcase grading at slaughterhouses; to provide for the making of additional grants to persons entitled to Community suckler cow premiums; and to provide for contributions out of the Forestry Fund towards the expenses of the verderers of the New Forest.
Planning and Compensation Act 1991	1991 c. 34	25 July 1991
An Act to amend the law relating to town and country planning; to extend the powers to acquire by agreement land which may be affected by carrying out public works; to amend the law relating to compulsory acquisition of land and to compensation where persons are displaced from land or the value of land or its enjoyment may be affected by public works; to provide, in the case of compensation payable in respect of things done in the exercise of statutory powers, for advance payments and payments in interest; and to repeal Part X of the Highways Act 1980. (Note: Highways Act 1980 (c. 66))
Badgers (Further Protection) Act 1991 (repealed)	1991 c. 35	25 July 1991
An Act to confer additional powers on a court where a dog has been used in or was present at the commission of certain offences under the Badgers Act 1973. (Note: Badgers Act 1973 (c. 57)) (Repealed by Protection of Badgers Act 1992 (c. 51))
Badgers Act 1991 (repealed)	1991 c. 36	25 July 1991
An Act to make provision for the protection of badger setts; and for connected purposes. (Repealed by Protection of Badgers Act 1992 (c. 51))
Smoke Detectors Act 1991 (repealed)	1991 c. 37	25 July 1991
An Act to make provision with respect to the fitting of smoke detectors in new dwellings. (Repealed by Regulatory Reform (Fire Safety) Order 2005 (SI 2005/1541))
Medical Qualifications (Amendment) Act 1991	1991 c. 38	25 July 1991
An Act to amend the definition of a primary United Kingdom qualification for registration as a medical practitioner.
Wildlife and Countryside (Amendment) Act 1991	1991 c. 39	25 July 1991
An Act to amend sections 5 and 11 of the Wildlife and Countryside Act 1981 (Note: Wildlife and Countryside Act 1981 (c. 69)) so as to make it an offence knowingly to cause or permit to be done certain acts mentioned in those sections.
Road Traffic Act 1991	1991 c. 40	25 July 1991
An Act to amend the law about road traffic.
Arms Control and Disarmament (Inspections) Act 1991	1991 c. 41	25 July 1991
An Act to facilitate the carrying out in the United Kingdom of inspections under the Protocol on Inspection incorporated in the Treaty on Conventional Armed Forces in Europe (Note: Treaty on Conventional Armed Forces in Europe) signed in Paris on 19th November 1990; and for connected purposes.
Social Security (Contributions) Act 1991 (repealed)	1991 c. 42	25 July 1991
An Act to introduce contributions under the Social Security Act 1975 (Note: Social Security Act 1975 (c. 14)) in respect of cars made available for private use and car fuel. (Repealed by Social Security (Consequential Provisions) Act 1992 (c. 6))
Forestry Act 1991	1991 c. 43	25 July 1991
An Act to increase from nine to twelve the maximum number of members of a regional advisory committee maintained under section 37 of the Forestry Act 1967. (Note: Forestry Act 1967 (c. 10))
Foreign Corporations Act 1991	1991 c. 44	25 July 1991
An Act to make provision about the status in the United Kingdom of bodies incorporated or formerly incorporated under the laws of certain territories outside the United Kingdom.
Coal Mining Subsidence Act 1991	1991 c. 45	25 July 1991
An Act to repeal and re-enact with amendments the Coal-Mining (Subsidence) Act 1957 (Note: Coal-Mining (Subsidence) Act 1957 (5 & 6 Eliz. 2. c. 59)) and, in the Coal Industry Act 1975, (Note: Coal Industry Act 1975 (c. 56)) section 2(4) and paragraphs 1 to 4 of Schedule 1; to make provision for imposing further obligations on the British Coal Corporation, including obligations corresponding to those voluntarily accepted by them under their code of practice concerning compensation for subsidence damage; and for connected purposes.
Atomic Weapons Establishment Act 1991	1991 c. 46	25 July 1991
An Act to make provision in connection with any arrangements that may be made by the Secretary of State with respect to the undertaking carried on by him and known as the Atomic Weapons Establishment.
Mental Health (Detention) (Scotland) Act 1991 (repealed)	1991 c. 47	25 July 1991
An Act to amend the Mental Health (Scotland) Act 1984 (Note: Mental Health (Scotland) Act 1984 (c. 36)) with respect to short-term detention of patients in hospital and the determination of applications for admission to hospital. (Repealed by Mental Health (Care and Treatment) (Scotland) Act 2003 (asp 13))
Child Support Act 1991	1991 c. 48	25 July 1991
An Act to make provision for the assessment, collection and enforcement of periodical maintenance payable by certain parents with respect to children of theirs who are not in their care; for the collection and enforcement of certain other kinds of maintenance; and for connected purposes.
School Teachers' Pay and Conditions Act 1991	1991 c. 49	25 July 1991
An Act to make provision with respect to the remuneration and other conditions of employment of school teachers; and for connected purposes.
Age of Legal Capacity (Scotland) Act 1991	1991 c. 50	25 July 1991
An Act to make provision in the law of Scotland as to the legal capacity of persons under the age of 18 years to enter into transactions, as to the setting aside and ratification by the court of transactions entered into by such persons and as to guardians of persons under the age of 16 years; to make provision in the law of Scotland relating to the time and date at which a person shall be taken to attain a particular age; and for connected purposes.
Local Government Finance and Valuation Act 1991 (repealed)	1991 c. 51	25 July 1991
An Act to abolish restrictions on the power of the Secretary of State to designate authorities under section 100 of the Local Government Finance Act 1988; to amend the grounds upon which the Secretary of State may make a report under Schedule 3 to the Abolition of Domestic Rates Etc. (Scotland) Act 1987; (Note: Abolition of Domestic Rates Etc. (Scotland) Act 1987 (c. 47)) to make provision for the valuation of domestic properties in England, Scotland and Wales; and for connected purposes. (Repealed by Local Government Finance Act 1992 (c. 14))
Ports Act 1991	1991 c. 52	25 July 1991
An Act to provide for the transfer to companies of certain statutory port undertakings and for the disposal of securities of the companies; to provide for a levy on initial disposals of securities of any company receiving such a transfer or of rights to require the issue of such securities; to provide for a levy in respect of gains accruing to such a company on disposals of certain land or certain interests in land; to provide for the transfer of certain property, rights, liabilities and functions of the Port of London Authority to a company formed by that Authority and for the disposal of securities of the company; to amend the law with respect to lighthouses, buoys and beacons and the authorities responsible for them; and for connected purposes.
Criminal Justice Act 1991	1991 c. 53	25 July 1991
An Act to make further provision with respect to the treatment of offenders and the position of children and young persons and persons having responsibility for them; to make provision with respect to certain services provided or proposed to be provided for purposes connected with the administration of justice or the treatment of offenders; to make financial and other provision with respect to that administration; and for connected purposes.
Deer Act 1991	1991 c. 54	25 July 1991
An Act to consolidate certain enactments relating to deer with amendments to give effect to recommendations of the Law Commission.
Agricultural Holdings (Scotland) Act 1991	1991 c. 55	25 July 1991
An Act to consolidate the Agricultural Holdings (Scotland) Act 1949 (Note: Agricultural Holdings (Scotland) Act 1949 (12, 13 & 14 Geo. 6. c. 75)) and other enactments relating to agricultural holdings in Scotland.
Water Industry Act 1991	1991 c. 56	25 July 1991
An Act to consolidate enactments relating to the supply of water and the provision of sewerage services, with amendments to give effect to recommendations of the Law Commission.
Water Resources Act 1991	1991 c. 57	25 July 1991
An Act to consolidate enactments relating to the National Rivers Authority and the matters in relation to which it exercises functions, with amendments to give effect to recommendations of the Law Commission.
Statutory Water Companies Act 1991 (repealed)	1991 c. 58	25 July 1991
An Act to consolidate certain enactments relating to statutory water companies. (Repealed by Deregulation Act 2015 (c. 20))
Land Drainage Act 1991	1991 c. 59	25 July 1991
An Act to consolidate the enactments relating to internal drainage boards, and to the functions of such boards and of local authorities in relation to land drainage, with amendments to give effect to recommendations of the Law Commission.
Water Consolidation (Consequential Provisions) Act 1991	1991 c. 60	25 July 1991
An Act to make provision for consequential amendments and repeals, and for transitional and transitory matters and savings, in connection with the consolidation of certain enactments in the Water Resources Act 1991, (Note: Water Resources Act 1991 (c. 57)) the Water Industry Act 1991, (Note: Water Industry Act 1991 (c. 56)) the Land Drainage Act 1991 (Note: Land Drainage Act 1991 (c. 59)) and the Statutory Water Companies Act 1991; (Note: Statutory Water Companies Act 1991 (c. 58)) and to repeal certain related enactments which are spent or unnecessary.
Statute Law Revision (Isle of Man) Act 1991	1991 c. 61	25 July 1991
An Act to revise the statute law by repealing obsolete, spent, unnecessary or superseded enactments so far as they continue to form part of the law of the Isle of Man.
Armed Forces Act 1991	1991 c. 62	25 July 1991
An Act to continue the Army Act 1955, (Note: Army Act 1955 (3 & 4 Eliz. 2. c. 18)) the Air Force Act 1955 (Note: Air Force Act 1955 (3 & 4 Eliz. 2. c. 19)) and the Naval Discipline Act 1957; (Note: Naval Discipline Act 1957 (5 & 6 Eliz. 2. c. 53)) to amend those Acts and other enactments relating to the armed forces; to make provision for compensation for miscarriages of justice before courts-martial; to make provision for orders for the assessment and emergency protection of children forming part of or staying with service families abroad; and for connected purposes.
British Railways Board (Finance) Act 1991	1991 c. 63	25 July 1991
An Act to alter the limits under section 42(6) of the Transport Act 1968 (Note: Transport Act 1968 (c. 73)) relating to the indebtedness of the British Railways Board and the limits on the amount of compensation payable in respect of certain public service obligations of the Board.
Breeding of Dogs Act 1991 (repealed)	1991 c. 64	25 July 1991
An Act to extend powers of inspection for the purposes of the Breeding of Dogs Act 1973 (Note: Breeding of Dogs Act 1973 (c. 60)) to premises not covered by a licence under that Act. (Repealed by Animal Welfare (Licensing of Activities Involving Animals) (England) Regulations 2018 (SI 2018/486))
Dangerous Dogs Act 1991	1991 c. 65	25 July 1991
An Act to prohibit persons from having in their possession or custody dogs belonging to types bred for fighting; to impose restrictions in respect of such dogs pending the coming into force of the prohibition; to enable restrictions to be imposed in relation to other types of dog which present a serious danger to the public; to make further provision for securing that dogs are kept under proper control; and for connected purposes.
British Technology Group Act 1991	1991 c. 66	22 October 1991
An Act to provide for the vesting of the property, rights and liabilities of the National Research Development Corporation and the National Enterprise Board in a company nominated by the Secretary of State and for the subsequent dissolution of the Corporation and Board; and for connected purposes.
Export and Investment Guarantees Act 1991	1991 c. 67	22 October 1991
An Act to make new provision as to the functions exercisable by the Secretary of State through the Export Credits Guarantee Department; and make provision as to the delegation of any such functions and the transfer of property, rights and liabilities attributable to the exercise of any such functions.
Consolidated Fund (No. 3) Act 1991 (repealed)	1991 c. 68	19 December 1991
An Act to apply certain sums out of the Consolidated Fund to the service of the years ending on 31st March 1992 and 1993. (Repealed by Appropriation Act 1994 (c. 24))
Welsh Development Agency Act 1991 (repealed)	1991 c. 69	19 December 1991
An Act to increase the financial limit in section 18(3) of the Welsh Development Agency Act 1975. (Note: Welsh Development Agency Act 1975 (c. 70)) (Repealed by Welsh Development Agency Act 1997 (c. 37))

== Local acts ==
Short title	Citation	Royal assent
Long title
Smith Kline & French Laboratories, Australia, and Menley & James, Australia Act 1991	1991 c. i	28 February 1991
An Act to make provision for the transfer to the State of New South Wales in the Commonwealth of Australia of the incorporation of Smith Kline & French Laboratories (Australia) Limited and Menley & James (Australia) Limited; for the cesser of application to those companies of provisions of the Companies Act 1985; (Note: Companies Act 1985 (c. 6)) and for other purposes incidental thereto.
Midland Metro (Penalty Fares) Act 1991	1991 c. ii	28 February 1991
An Act to make provision for the charging of penalty fares in substitution for the proper fares for persons using the Midland Metro without a valid ticket for such use; and for related purposes.
Standard Life Assurance Company Act 1991	1991 c. iii	7 March 1991
An Act to repeal the Standard Life Assurance Company Acts 1925 to 1980 (Note: Standard Life Assurance Company Act 1925 (15 & 16 Geo. 5. c. xlii)) (Note: Standard Life Assurance Company Act 1976 (c. vii)) (Note: Standard Life Assurance Company Act 1980 (c. xxvi)) and to make new provision for the regulation and management of the Company; and for other purposes.
Tay Road Bridge Order Confirmation Act 1991	1991 c. iv	9 May 1991
An Act to confirm a Provisional Order under the Private Legislation Procedure (Scotland) Act 1936, (Note: Private Legislation Procedure (Scotland) Act 1936 (26 Geo. 5 & 1 Edw. 8. c. 52)) relating to Tay Road Bridge.
	Tay Road Bridge Order 1991 Provisional Order to re-enact with amendments certain provisions of the Tay Road Bridge Order 1962; to confer further powers upon the Tay Road Bridge Joint Board; and for other purposes.	
Shard Bridge Act 1991	1991 c. v	9 May 1991
An Act to modify the Transport Charges &c. (Miscellaneous Provisions) Act 1954 (Note: Transport Charges &c. (Miscellaneous Provisions) Act 1954 (2 & 3 Eliz. 2. c. 64)) in its application to the bridge undertaking of the Shard Bridge Company; to confer other powers on the proprietors and to amend or repeal certain of the local statutory provisions applicable to them; and for other purposes.
Adelphi Estate Act 1991	1991 c. vi	9 May 1991
An Act to repeal certain statutory restrictions upon development of lands on the north side of the river Thames between Westminster Bridge and Blackfriars Bridge; and for other purposes.
Heathrow Express Railway Act 1991	1991 c. vii	9 May 1991
An Act to empower Heathrow Airport Limited and the British Railways Board to construct a railway into Heathrow Airport, and in connection therewith to execute works and to purchase or use land; to confer further powers on the Company and the Board; and for other purposes.
Killingholme Generating Stations (Ancillary Powers) Act 1991	1991 c. viii	27 June 1991
An Act to confer powers upon National Power PLC and PowerGen plc for the construction of ancillary works in connection with proposed generating stations at Killingholme and for the acquisition of lands and easements or rights for the purposes thereof; and for other purposes.
Heathrow Express Railway (No. 2) Act 1991	1991 c. ix	27 June 1991
An Act to empower Heathrow Airport Limited to purchase or use additional land; and for related purposes.
London Underground (Victoria) Act 1991	1991 c. x	27 June 1991
An Act to empower London Underground Limited to construct works and to acquire or use lands; and for connected purposes.
Llanelli Borough Council (Dafen Estuary) Act 1991	1991 c. xi	27 June 1991
An Act to enable all rights of navigation over part of the river Dafen in south Llanelli to be extinguished; and for connected or other purposes.
Highland Regional Council (Harbours) Order Confirmation Act 1991	1991 c. xii	25 July 1991
An Act to confirm a Provisional Order under the Private Legislation Procedure (Scotland) Act 1936, relating to Highland Regional Council (Harbours).
	Highland Regional Council (Harbours) Order 1991 Provisional Order to make further and better provision for the administration, improvement and regulation of the harbours controlled by the Highland Regional Council; and for connected purposes.	
London Local Authorities Act 1991	1991 c. xiii	25 July 1991
An Act to confer further powers upon local authorities in London; and for other purposes.
North Yorkshire County Council Act 1991	1991 c. xiv	25 July 1991
An Act to make provision with respect to the opening for vessels of Cawood Bridge; to provide for the control of occasional sales and the regulation of dealers in second-hand goods; and for connected or other purposes.
Brighton Marine Palace and Pier Act 1991	1991 c. xv	25 July 1991
An Act to authorise the Brighton Marine Palace and Pier Company to construct works; and for other purposes.
Greater Manchester (Light Rapid Transit System) Act 1991	1991 c. xvi	22 October 1991
An Act to empower the Greater Manchester Passenger Transport Executive to construct further works and to acquire additional lands; to confer additional powers on the Executive; and for other purposes.
Birmingham City Council Act 1991	1991 c. xvii	22 October 1991
An Act to authorise the Birmingham City Council to dispose of or appropriate Cannon Hill House in the city for educational purposes.
London Underground (Safety Measures) Act 1991	1991 c. xviii	28 November 1991
An Act to empower London Underground Limited, for safety purposes and the relief of passenger congestion, to construct works to improve the underground stations at London Bridge, Holborn and Tottenham Court Road and to acquire lands; and for connected purposes.
City of Edinburgh District Council Order Confirmation Act 1991	1991 c. xix	19 December 1991
An Act to confirm a Provisional Order under the Private Legislation Procedure (Scotland) Act 1936, relating to City of Edinburgh District Council.
	City of Edinburgh District Council Order 1991 Provisional Order to repeal and re-enact with amendments certain local statutory provisions in force within the City of Edinburgh District; to confer further powers on the City of Edinburgh District Council; and for other purposes.	
Strathclyde Regional Council Order Confirmation Act 1991	1991 c. xx	19 December 1991
An Act to confirm a Provisional Order under the Private Legislation Procedure (Scotland) Act 1936, relating to Strathclyde Regional Council.
	Strathclyde Regional Council Order 1991 Provisional Order to re-enact with amendments certain local statutory provisions in force within the Strathclyde Region; to confer further powers on the Strathclyde Regional Council; and for other purposes.	
Torquay Market Act 1991	1991 c. xxi	19 December 1991
An Act to provide for the dissolution of the Torquay Market Company and the vesting of its undertaking in Torquay Market Company Limited; to repeal the Torquay Market Acts 1855 (Note: Torquay Market Act 1855 (18 & 19 Vict. c. xxvii)) and 1974; (Note: Torquay Market Act 1974 (c. xxxii)) and for other purposes.
Commercial and Private Bank Act 1991	1991 c. xxii	19 December 1991
An Act to provide for the transfer to and vesting in Commercial and Private Bank of the undertaking of WPZ Bank (UK) Ltd; and for other purposes.
London Docklands Railway Act 1991	1991 c. xxiii	19 December 1991
An Act to empower London Regional Transport to construct works and to acquire lands; to confer further powers on London Regional Transport; and for other purposes.

== See also ==
- List of acts of the Parliament of the United Kingdom
