= Outdoor water-use restriction =

Consequences of climate change

An outdoor water-use restriction is a ban or other lesser restrictions put into effect that restricts the outdoor use of water supplies. Often called a watering ban or hosepipe ban, it can affect:

- irrigation of lawns
- car washing
- recreational uses such as filling swimming pools and using water slides
- planting of grass or control of the types of grass planted
- hosing down pavement areas

Such bans may be put in place by local governments, a state government or water supplier. In the latter case, local authorities often still can enact more restrictive measures.

Such a ban is usually enacted during droughts, to preserve water for essential uses such as drinking and flushing toilets, as well as for firefighting. If there is a water main break, or a problem with a water tower or other reservoir, a ban may be enacted on a very local and temporary basis. Bans that control water and plant uses can be permanent. Greywater recycling is becoming a necessity due to shortages in freshwater supply, an increase in populations with its associated food supply, and economic development.

== Restrictions ==
Typical restrictions include:

- the "odd/even" system, whereby odd-numbered addresses water on odd-numbered dates, and even-numbered ones on even-numbered dates
- water use may be restricted to specific days of the week
- water use may be prohibited in the afternoon, when much of the spray is lost to evaporation.

The use of drip irrigation systems may or may not be exempt from the restrictions, or be less restricted than normal water sprinklers.

Businesses that use water as a critical part of their operations are usually not exempt. This includes car washes, plant nurseries, and other landscaping companies. A typical restriction on a car wash would be to recycle the water.

Abuse of restrictions usually brings a warning at first, then a fine, and can lead to limiting or cutting off the water to the home or business. Restriction can be accomplished by putting a flow limiter—a disc with a small hole—in the water intake pipe, allowing enough water for human consumption but not irrigation. Enforcement is generally by the local water authority or even from police.

== Non-potable water usage ==
Using native vegetation, such as xeriscaping in desert locations, avoids having to water in the first place. Using greywater or stored runoff from a roof gutter downspout is also an alternative for trees and shrubs, but not for large expanses of grass, which would be difficult to cover. Australian researchers have concluded that there is little evidence for spreading of disease through greywater used in landscaping and that greywater should be applied below the soil surface and not directly on top.

== Countries ==
=== Australia ===
Water restrictions are in place in many regions and cities of Australia in response to chronic shortages resulting from drought. Depending upon the location, these can include restrictions on watering lawns, using sprinkler systems, washing vehicles, hosing in paved areas and refilling swimming pools, among others. Water restrictions in Australia are enforced by fines and for repeat offenders by reducing water supply.

=== United Kingdom ===
A hosepipe ban is a British term for a water restriction placed on the customers of a water company to prevent them from using garden hoses, particularly for watering their gardens. The provider sometimes states that their customers are not allowed to use a sprinkler or unattended hosepipe for a few days (or longer), but commonly, a total ban is enacted. Bans are usually in England and South Wales, rarely in Scotland because of the damper climate. Commercial customers are usually exempt to prevent loss of earnings or other such problems.

The water industry usually places such restrictions on their customers during droughts or when the reservoirs supplying the water are becoming empty.

Previously, contravening a temporary water restriction is a criminal offence in the United Kingdom under the Water Industry Act 1991 (though the first prosecution for "wasteful use of water" was in 1921 and resulted in a fine of 20 shillings). Although offenders are usually warned, they are liable upon conviction to a fine not exceeding £1,000 under the terms of the Act. Currently the law on hosepipe bans is contained in section 36 of the Flood and Water Management Act 2010, which replaced the previous law which was contained in section 76 of the Water Industry Act 1991. Previously, under the Water Industry Act 1991, hosepipe bans could only prohibit the watering of private gardens and/or the washing of private motor cars. The Flood and Water Management Act 2010 has extended considerably the sort of activities that can be prohibited.

In August 2022, hosepipe bans were introduced during the widespread drought. In 2025, bans were introduced by Yorkshire Water, Thames Water, Southern Water and South East Water.
