= List of acts of the National Assembly for Wales from 2016 =

This is a list of acts of the National Assembly for Wales passed in 2016. Acts of the National Assembly for Wales are acts of Senedd Cymru enacted by Senedd Cymru (the Welsh Parliament; or simply the Senedd) under its former name of the National Assembly for Wales. It has legislative authority over devolved matters in relation to Wales under the authority of the Government of Wales Act 2006. All legislation passed by the Senedd is bilingual, with the English and Welsh texts being equally authoritative. Acts are cited by calendar year, in the same fashion as acts of Parliament of the United Kingdom. Each act passed in a respective year is numbered consecutively with Arabic numerals, following the prefix "anaw" (or, in Welsh, "dccc").

6 acts of the National Assembly for Wales were passed in 2016.

indicates that an act has been transcribed on Wikisource, indicates that an act is available to view at legislation.gov.uk, and indicates the location of the original act in the National Library of Wales.

== Acts of the National Assembly for Wales ==
Short title	Citation	Royal assent
Long title
Renting Homes (Wales) Act 2016; Deddf Rhentu Cartrefi (Cymru) 2016	2016 anaw 1; 2016 dccc 1	18 January 2016
An Act of the National Assembly for Wales to make provision about tenancies and licences which confer the right to occupy a dwelling as a home, including provision establishing two kinds of contract for the purpose of renting homes; and for connected purposes. Deddf Cynulliad Cenedlaethol Cymru i wneud darpariaeth ynghylch tenantiaethau a thrwyddedau sy'n rhoi'r hawl i feddiannu annedd fel cartref, gan gynnwys darpariaeth sy'n sefydlu dau fath o gontract at ddiben rhentu cartrefi; ac at ddibenion cysylltiedig.
Regulation and Inspection of Social Care (Wales) Act 2016; Deddf Rheoleiddio ac Arolygu Gofal Cymdeithasol (Cymru) 2016	2016 anaw 2; 2016 dccc 2	18 January 2016
An Act of the National Assembly for Wales to make provision for the registration and regulation of persons providing care home services, secure accommodation services, residential family centre services, adoption services, fostering services, adult placement services, advocacy services and domiciliary support services; amending the Social Services and Well-being (Wales) Act 2014 (Note: Social Services and Well-being (Wales) Act 2014 (anaw 4)) in connection with the regulation of the social services functions of local authorities; for the renaming of the Care Council for Wales as Social Care Wales; for Social Care Wales to provide advice and other assistance to persons providing services involving care and support; for the registration, regulation and training of social care workers; and for connected purposes. Deddf Cynulliad Cenedlaethol Cymru i wneud darpariaeth ar gyfer cofrestru a rheoleiddio personau sy'n darparu gwasanaethau cartrefi gofal, gwasanaethau llety diogel, gwasanaethau canolfannau preswyl i deuluoedd, gwasanaethau mabwysiadu, gwasanaethau maethu, gwasanaethau lleoli oedolion, gwasanaethau eirioli a gwasanaethau cymorth cartref; sy'n diwygio Deddf Gwasanaethau Cymdeithasol a Llesiant (Cymru) 2014 mewn cysylltiad â rheoleiddio swyddogaethau gwasanaethau cymdeithasol awdurdodau lleol; ar gyfer ailenwi Cyngor Gofal Cymru yn Ofal Cymdeithasol Cymru; i Ofal Cymdeithasol Cymru ddarparu cyngor a chynhorthwy arall i bersonau sy'n darparu gwasanaethau sy'n ymwneud â gofal a chymorth; ar gyfer cofrestru, rheoleiddio a hyfforddi gweithwyr gofal cymdeithasol; ac at ddibenion cysylltiedig.
Environment (Wales) Act 2016; Deddf yr Amgylchedd (Cymru) 2016	2016 anaw 3; 2016 dccc 3	21 March 2016
An Act of the National Assembly for Wales to promote sustainable management of natural resources; to provide for targets for reducing emissions of greenhouse gases; to reform the law on charges for carrier bags; to provide for the separate collection of waste, prohibit disposal of food waste to sewers and provide for prohibiting or regulating disposal of waste by incineration; to make provision about several and regulated fisheries for shellfish; to make provision about fees for marine licences; to establish the Flood and Coastal Erosion Committee; and to make minor changes to the law about land drainage and byelaws made by the Natural Resources Body for Wales. Deddf Cynulliad Cenedlaethol Cymru i hyrwyddo rheoli cynaliadwy ar adnoddau naturiol; i ddarparu ar gyfer targedau i leihau allyriadau nwyon tŷ gwydr; i ddiwygio'r gyfraith ar godi taliadau am fagiau siopa; i ddarparu ar gyfer casglu gwastraff ar wahân, gwahardd gwaredu gwastraff bwyd i garthffosydd ac i ddarparu ar gyfer gwahardd neu reoleiddio gwaredu gwastraff drwy losgi; i wneud darpariaeth ynghylch pysgodfeydd unigol a rheoleiddiedig ar gyfer pysgod cregyn; i wneud darpariaeth ynghylch ffioedd am drwyddedau morol; i sefydlu'r Pwyllgor Llifogydd ac Erydu Arfordirol; ac i wneud mân newidiadau i'r gyfraith ynghylch draenio tir ac is-ddeddfau a wneir gan Gorff Adnoddau Naturiol Cymru.
Historic Environment (Wales) Act 2016; Deddf yr Amgylchedd Hanesyddol (Cymru) 2016	2016 anaw 4; 2016 dccc 4	21 March 2016
An Act of the National Assembly for Wales to make provision amending certain aspects of the law relating to ancient monuments and listed buildings; to establish a register of historic parks and gardens and a list of historic place names; to establish historic environment records for local authority areas; to establish an Advisory Panel for the Welsh Historic Environment; and for connected purposes. Deddf Cynulliad Cenedlaethol Cymru i wneud darpariaeth sy'n diwygio agweddau penodol ar y gyfraith sy'n ymwneud â henebion hynafol ac adeiladau rhestredig; i sefydlu cofrestr o barciau a gerddi hanesyddol a rhestr o enwau lleoedd hanesyddol; i sefydlu cofnodion amgylchedd hanesyddol ar gyfer ardaloedd awdurdod lleol; i sefydlu Panel Cynghori ar Amgylchedd Hanesyddol Cymru; ac at ddibenion cysylltiedig.
Nurse Staffing Levels (Wales) Act 2016; Deddf Lefelau Staff Nyrsio (Cymru) 2016	2016 anaw 5; 2016 dccc 5	21 March 2016
An Act of the National Assembly for Wales to make provision about Local Health Boards and NHS Trusts in Wales establishing nurse staffing levels. Deddf Cynulliad Cenedlaethol Cymru i wneud darpariaeth ynghylch Byrddau Iechyd Lleol ac Ymddiriedolaethau GIG yng Nghymru yn sefydlu lefelau staff nyrsio.
Tax Collection and Management (Wales) Act 2016; Deddf Casglu a Rheoli Trethi (Cymru) 2016	2016 anaw 6; 2016 dccc 6	25 April 2016
An Act of the National Assembly for Wales to establish the Welsh Revenue Authority; to make provision about the collection and management of devolved taxes; and for connected purposes. Deddf Cynulliad Cenedlaethol Cymru i sefydlu Awdurdod Cyllid Cymru; i wneud darpariaeth ynghylch casglu a rheoli trethi datganoledig; ac at ddibenion cysylltiedig.
