= Rural Water Supplies and Sewerage Act 1944 =

Act of the Parliament of the United Kingdom

Rural Water Supplies and Sewerage Act 1944 (Note: Section 8(1).)
- Act of Parliament
- Parliament of the United Kingdom
- Long title: An Act to make provision as to water supplies, sewerage and sewage disposal in rural localities, and to make expenses incurred by rural district councils in connection with water supply, sewerage and sewage disposal general expenses.
- Citation: 7 & 8 Geo. 6. c. 26
- Territorial extent: England and Wales; Scotland; (Note: Section 8(1).)

Dates
- Royal assent: 27 July 1944
- Commencement: 27 July 1944 (Note: The Acts of Parliament (Commencement) Act 1793.)
- Repealed: England and Wales: 1 December 1991; Scotland: 1 April 1996 (Note: The Local Government etc. (Scotland) Act 1994 (Commencement No.7 and Savings) Order 1996 (SI 1996/323).)
Other legislation
Amends	Rural Water Supplies Act 1934; Public Health Act 1936
Amended by	Rural Water Supplies and Sewerage Act 1955; Rural Water Supplies and Sewerage Act 1971; Statute Law (Repeals) Act 1975
Repealed by	England and Wales: Water Consolidation (Consequential Provisions) Act 1991; Scotland: Water (Scotland) Act 1946 and Local Government etc. (Scotland) Act 1994

Status: Repealed

Text of statute as originally enacted

The Rural Water Supplies and Sewerage Act 1944 (7 & 8 Geo. 6. c. 26) was an act of the Parliament of the United Kingdom, introduced by the coalition government.

It empowered the government to make grants for the purpose of expanding rural water supplies, up to the sum of £15 million in England and Wales and £6,375,000 in Scotland – this sum was extended to £20 million for Scotland by the Water (Scotland) Act 1949 (12, 13 & 14 Geo. 6. c. 31).

== Implementation ==
By March 1950 the Government had granted £9,839,000 in England and Wales, and £6,619,000 in Scotland, with £3,700,000 of the latter sum being spent in the Highlands; applications for the remainder of the grants were in process. The limiting factor on expenditure had been the availability of labour and materials, not problems with the provision of finance.

Prior to 1944, while most households in urban areas of England and Wales had a piped water supply, the situation in rural areas was that only 70 per cent had this service. As a result of the provisions of the Act, this had increased to 80 per cent by 1951.

On 18 November 1947, Colin Thornton-Kemsley, the MP for Kincardine and Western Aberdeenshire, asked questions in the House of Commons of Arthur Woodburn, the Secretary of State for Scotland, about the practical outworkings of the Act, as by that time applications for grants in Scotland exceeded the money available by around £25 million. Woodburn responded that he had previously mentioned the possibility of extending the sum available, but that it would require new legislation to do so.

The outworkings of the act were again raised by Major Simon Ramsay, MP for Forfarshire, on 10 May 1949, when he requested information about how many schemes had benefitted from the Act in Scotland. Woodburn replied that 70 water supply schemes had been started, of which 36 were already completed, and that 68 drainage schemes has been started, of which 44 were complete.

== Subsequent developments ==
Section 1(7) of the act was repealed by section 1(1) of, and part VIII of the schedule to, the Statute Law (Repeals) Act 1975, which came into force on 13 March 1975.

The whole act was repealed for England and Wales by section 3(1) of, and part I of schedule 3 to, the Water Consolidation (Consequential Provisions) Act 1991, which came into force on 1 December 1991.

The whole act was repealed for Scotland by section 180(2) of, and schedule 14 to, the Local Government etc. (Scotland) Act 1994, which came into force on 1 April 1996.

== Bibliography ==
- Ofwat (2006). "The Development of the Water Industry in England and Wales" (PDF). ofwat.gov.uk.
