= Import of Live Fish (England and Wales) Act 1980 =

Act of the Parliament of the United Kingdom

Import of Live Fish (England and Wales) Act 1980 (Note: Section 5(1).)
- Act of Parliament
- Parliament of the United Kingdom
- Long title: An Act to restrict the import, keeping or release of live fish or shellfish or the live eggs or milt of fish or shellfish of certain species.
- Citation: 1980 c. 27
- Territorial extent: England and Wales (Note: Section 5(2).)

Dates
- Royal assent: 15 May 1980
- Commencement: 15 May 1980 (Note: Section 4(b) of the Interpretation Act 1978.)

Other legislation
- Amended by: Fisheries Act 1981; Criminal Justice Act 1982; Countryside and Rights of Way Act 2000; Natural Environment and Rural Communities Act 2006; Aquatic Animal Health (England and Wales) Regulations 2009; Wales Act 2017
- Relates to: Diseases of Fish Act 1937

Status: Amended

Text of statute as originally enacted

Revised text of statute as amended

Text of the Import of Live Fish (England and Wales) Act 1980 as in force today (including any amendments) within the United Kingdom, from legislation.gov.uk.

The Import of Live Fish (England and Wales) Act 1980 (c. 27) is an act of the Parliament of the United Kingdom which controls the release of non-indigenous species of fish, affording protection to native species of fish within the boundaries of England and Wales.

== Provisions ==
The act enables the government to publish secondary legislation prohibiting or requiring licences for the import, keeping or release of live fish or fish eggs of non-native species.

The act specifies a number of exceptions to this for "ornamental fish".

The act specifies a number of invasive species in schedules to the act, but generally applies to all non-native species.

Not holding a licence or failing to comply with the licence requirements will result in a possible conviction and the destruction of the non-indigenous animals.
