= Water Consolidation (Consequential Provisions) Act 1991 =

Act of the Parliament of the United Kingdom

Water Consolidation (Consequential Provisions) Act 1991 (Note: Section 4(1).)
- Act of Parliament
- Parliament of the United Kingdom
- Long title: An Act to make provision for consequential amendments and repeals, and for transitional and transitory matters and savings, in connection with the consolidation of certain enactments in the Water Resources Act 1991, the Water Industry Act 1991, the Land Drainage Act 1991 and the Statutory Water Companies Act 1991; and to repeal certain related enactments which are spent or unnecessary.
- Citation: 1991 c. 60
- Territorial extent: England and Wales (Note: Section 4(3)–(7).)

Dates
- Royal assent: 25 July 1991
- Commencement: 1 December 1991 (Note: Section 4(2).)

Other legislation
- Amends: Public Works Loans Act 1965; See § Repealed enactments and revoked instruments
- Repeals/revokes: See § Repealed enactments and revoked instruments
- Amended by: Radioactive Substances Act 1993; Environment Act 1995; Pollution Prevention and Control Act 1999; Competition Act 1998 (Competition Commission) Transitional, Consequential and Supplemental Provisions Order 1999; Enterprise Act 2002; Water Act 2003; Constitutional Reform Act 2005; Companies Act 2006; Companies Act 2006 (Consequential Amendments etc) Order 2008; Marine and Coastal Access Act 2009; Companies Act 2006 (Consequential Amendments, Transitional Provisions and Savings) Order 2009; Environmental Permitting (England and Wales) Regulations 2010; Environmental Permitting (England and Wales) Regulations 2016
- Relates to: Water Resources Act 1991; Water Industry Act 1991; Statutory Water Companies Act 1991; Land Drainage Act 1991

Status: Partially repealed

Text of statute as originally enacted

Revised text of statute as amended

Text of the Water Consolidation (Consequential Provisions) Act 1991 as in force today (including any amendments) within the United Kingdom, from legislation.gov.uk.

The Water Consolidation (Consequential Provisions) Act 1991 (c. 60) is an act of the Parliament of the United Kingdom that made consequential amendments and repeals in connection with the consolidation of enactments relating to water in England and Wales.

The act repealed enactments consolidated by the Water Resources Act 1991, the Water Industry Act 1991, the Statutory Water Companies Act 1991 and the Land Drainage Act 1991.

== Provisions ==
=== Repealed enactments and revoked instruments ===
Sections 3(1) and 3(2) of the act repealed 54 enactments and revoked 8 instruments, listed in parts I and II of schedule 3 to the act, respectively.

Part I – Repeals
Citation	Short title	Extent of repeal
24 & 25 Geo. 5. c. 20	Water Supplies (Exceptional Shortage Orders) Act 1934	The whole act.
26 Geo. 5 & 1 Edw. 8. c. 49	Public Health Act 1936	Sections 17 to 19. Sections 21 and 22. Section 27. Sections 30 and 31. Section 34. Section 36. Section 42. In section 48, in subsection (1), the words "directly or" and subsection (1A). In section 90, in subsection (4), the words from "and any reference" onwards and subsection (5). In section 278(3), the words from "on", in the first place where it occurs, to "them, or". In section 339, the proviso.
1 Edw. 8 & 1 Geo. 6. c. 40	Public Health (Drainage of Trade Premises) Act 1937	Sections 1 to 3. Section 4(5). Sections 7 and 7A. Sections 9 and 10. Sections 13 and 14.
7 & 8 Geo. 6. c. 26	Rural Water Supplies and Sewerage Act 1944	The whole act.
8 & 9 Geo. 6. c. 42	Water Act 1945	Section 7. Section 14(9), (10) and (12). Sections 15 and 16. Section 21. Section 35(2) and (4). Section 41. Section 43. Section 45. Section 48. Section 53. Section 56. Section 59.
11 & 12 Geo. 6. c. 22	Water Act 1948	Section 5(4). Section 6.
3 & 4 Eliz. 2. c. 13	Rural Water Supplies and Sewerage Act 1955	The whole act.
6 & 7 Eliz. 2. c. 69	Opencast Coal Act 1958	In section 51(1), the definition of "drainage authority".
8 & 9 Eliz. 2. c. 34	Radioactive Substances Act 1960	In Part I of Schedule 1, in paragraph 3 the words "twenty-seven", paragraphs 5, 6 and 8B, the paragraph 8F inserted by Schedule 25 to the Water Act 1989 and the paragraph 8G inserted by the Control of Pollution (Radioactive Waste) Regulations 1989.
9 & 10 Eliz. 2. c. 64	Public Health Act 1961	Section 1(3). Sections 59 to 64. Sections 66 to 68. Section 69(1).
1963 c. 33	London Government Act 1963	In Part I of Schedule 11, paragraph 27. In Schedule 9, paragraphs 11 and 17 of Part II and Part III. In Schedule 14, paragraph 10.
1963 c. 38	Water Resources Act 1963	Section 2. Section 17. Section 19. Sections 22 to 32. Sections 36 to 55. Section 60. Sections 63 and 64. Section 71(3). Section 78. Section 79(3) to (6), (8) and (9). Sections 81 and 82. Section 88. Section 91. Sections 105 and 106. Section 109. Sections 114 to 118. Section 120. Section 123. Section 126(3) and (4). Section 128(1) and (2). Sections 131 and 132. Section 133(2). Section 134(1), (2) and (6)(c). In section 135— (a) subsection (1), except in so far as it defines "local enactment", "performance" and "repeal"; and (b) subsections (2), (3) and (5) to (8). Schedule 7. Schedule 10.
1964 c. 40	Harbours Act 1964	In section 58, the words "(within the meaning of the Land Drainage Act 1930)".
1965 c. 4	Science and Technology Act 1965	In Schedule 2, the entry relating to section 7 of the Water Act 1945.
1965 c. 36	Gas Act 1965	Section 28(5).
1967 c. 22	Agriculture Act 1967	In section 50(3)(h), the words "(within the meaning of the Land Drainage Act 1930)".
1968 c. 13	National Loans Act 1968	In section 6(1), the words "section 1(3)(b) of the Rural Water Supplies and Sewerage Act 1955".
1968 c. 35	Water Resources Act 1968	The whole act.
1971 c. 49	Rural Water Supplies and Sewerage Act 1971	The whole act.
1972 c. 70	Local Government Act 1972	In Schedule 13, paragraph 24.
1973 c. 37	Water Act 1973	Section 14(4). In Schedule 8, paragraphs 37, 39, 49, 78, 79, 80(1) and (3), 83, 85 and 86.
1974 c. 40	Control of Pollution Act 1974	Section 43. Section 44(1), (3), (5) and (6). Section 45. In Schedule 2, paragraphs 6 to 9, 14 and 16. In Schedule 3, paragraphs 8 to 10.
1975 c. 51	Salmon and Freshwater Fisheries Act 1975	In section 6(3)(c), the words "under this Act". In section 28, subsections (3) to (8). In Schedule 3, paragraphs 7 to 9 and 13 to 38.
1976 c. 55	Agriculture (Miscellaneous Provisions) Act 1976	In Schedule 3, the entries relating to the Land Drainage Act 1961 and sections 21(1), 23(1) and 24(1) of the Agriculture (Miscellaneous Provisions) Act 1968.
1976 c. 70	Land Drainage Act 1976	Sections 4 to 19. Sections 21 to 61. Sections 63 and 64. Sections 67 to 69. Sections 71 and 72. Sections 74 to 79. Section 80(2) to (4). Sections 82 to 100. Sections 102 to 104A. Sections 106 to 115. Section 116, except so much of subsection (1) as defines "drainage", "land", "land drainage", "land drainage functions" and "the London excluded area". Section 117(1) and (3). In section 118(3), the words "Save as provided by section 32(4) above". Schedules 1 to 4. Schedule 6. In Schedule 7, paragraphs 6 and 8. Schedule 8.
1977 c. 45	Criminal Law Act 1977	In Schedule 1, the entry relating to section 7 of the Water Act 1945. In Schedule 6, the entries relating to sections 14 and 16 of the Water Act 1945.
1979 c. 46	Ancient Monuments and Archaeological Areas Act 1979	In Schedule 4, paragraph 16.
1980 c. 43	Magistrates' Courts Act 1980	In Schedule 7, paragraph 147.
1980 c. 65	Local Government, Planning and Land Act 1980	Section 181.
1980 c. 66	Highways Act 1980	In Schedule 24, paragraph 4.
1981 c. 12	Water Act 1981	Section 6.
1981 c. 54	Supreme Court Act 1981	In Schedule 5, the entry relating to the Public Health Act 1961.
1981 c. 67	Acquisition of Land Act 1981	In Schedule 4, in paragraph 1, the entry relating to the Land Drainage Act 1976.
1982 c. 32	Local Government Finance Act 1982	In Schedule 5, paragraph 7.
1983 c. 23	Water Act 1983	In Schedule 4, paragraphs 5 and 6.
1983 c. 55	Value Added Tax Act 1983	In section 20(3)(c), the words "within the meaning of the Land Drainage Act 1976".
1984 c. 12	Telecommunications Act 1984	In Schedule 4, paragraph 66(1) and (2).
1984 c. 31	London Regional Transport Act 1984	In Schedule 6, paragraph 12.
1985 c. 51	Local Government Act 1985	In Schedule 4, paragraph 47. In Schedule 7, paragraphs 2 and 5 to 9.
1985 c. 63	Water (Fluoridation) Act 1985	The whole act.
1985 c. 65	Insolvency Act 1985	In Schedule 8, paragraph 29.
1986 c. 31	Airports Act 1986	In Schedule 2, paragraph 5.
1986 c. 44	Gas Act 1986	In Schedule 7, paragraphs 2(6) and 25.
1986 c. 49	Agriculture Act 1986	In Schedule 3, paragraph 3.
1986 c. 62	Salmon Act 1986	Section 33(3).
1986 c. 63	Housing and Planning Act 1986	Section 42(1)(b).
1987 c. 3	Coal Industry Act 1987	In Schedule 1, paragraph 32.
1989 c. 15	Water Act 1989	In section 1, subsections (1) to (5). Sections 2 and 3. In section 5, subsections (1) to (4). In section 6, subsections (1) to (7). Sections 7 to 10. Section 11(1) to (8). Sections 12 to 68. Section 70(3) to (5). Sections 71 to 82. Sections 97 to 136. In section 137, subsections (1) to (8), (10) and (11). Section 138. Section 139(1) to (5). Section 140. Section 141(1) to (4) and (7). Section 142(1). Sections 143 to 167. Sections 170 to 172. Section 176. Sections 178 to 182. In section 184— (a) in subsection (1), the words "25(2) or" and the words from "or by" onwards; (b) in subsections (3) and (5), the words "or the Minister"; and (c) in subsection (4), the words from the beginning to "Schedule 6 to this Act". In section 185(1), the words "(except in the case of regulations under section 13(1) above)". Section 186. Section 188. In section 189— (a) subsection (1) except in so far as it defines "the 1945 Act", "the 1973 Act", "the Authority", "contravention", "the Director", "disposal" and cognate expressions, "enactment", "holding company", "information", "local statutory provision", "the Minister", "modifications" and cognate expressions, "sewer", "subordinate legislation", "statutory water company", "successor company", "transfer date" and "water authority"; and (b) subsections (2) to (5) and (8). In section 192(3), paragraph (c) and the word "or" immediately preceding it. In Schedule 1, paragraphs 1 to 10 and 14 to 23. In Schedule 3, paragraphs 1 to 5. In Schedule 4, paragraphs 1 to 5. Schedules 5 to 7. In Schedule 8, paragraphs 1 and 2(1) to (10) and (12) and paragraphs 3 to 5. Schedules 9 to 16. In Schedule 17, paragraphs 6(b) and 7(2), (7)(a), (14)(a) to (f) and (g)(i) and (16). Schedules 18 to 21. Schedule 24. In Schedule 25— (a) paragraph 2; (b) in paragraph 3(1), the words from "or in" onwards; (c) paragraphs 6, 7, 10, 21, 27(4) and 31(1); (d) in paragraph 32(5), the words after paragraph (b); (e) paragraph 40; (f) in paragraph 45, sub-paragraphs (1) and (2); and (g) paragraphs 61(5), 63, 71(1) and (2), 72, 73 and 80(1). In Schedule 26— (a) in paragraph 5, sub-paragraphs (2) to (4); (b) paragraphs 7 to 12; (c) paragraph 13(1); (d) in paragraph 14, sub-paragraphs (1) and (2) and in sub-paragraph (5) the words "(1) or"; (e) in paragraph 15, sub-paragraph (2); (f) in paragraph 16, sub-paragraphs (1), (2), (5) to (7) and (10); (g) paragraphs 18 and 19; (h) paragraphs 21 to 39; (i) in paragraph 40, sub-paragraph (2) and in sub-paragraph (3), the words from the beginning to the end of paragraph (b) and the word "and" immediately after that paragraph; (j) in paragraph 41, sub-paragraphs (2) and (3) and in sub-paragraph (4), the words "or (2)"; (k) paragraphs 42 to 45; (l) paragraph 48; (m) paragraph 50; (n) paragraph 56; and (o) in paragraph 57, sub-paragraphs (1) to (5) and (7).
1989 c. 29	Electricity Act 1989	In Schedule 16, paragraphs 1(1)(vi) and (5), 3(1)(a), 10, 21 and 37.
1990 c. 11	Planning (Consequential Provisions) Act 1990	In Schedule 2, paragraphs 46 and 81(1) and (2).
1990 c. 16	Food Safety Act 1990	Section 55(2) to (6).
1990 c. 43	Environmental Protection Act 1990	Section 145(1). In Schedule 8, paragraph 8. In Schedule 9, paragraph 17. In Schedule 15, paragraphs 18, 28, 29 and 30.
1991 c. 22	New Roads and Street Works Act 1991	In Schedule 8, paragraphs 110 and 122.
1991 c. 34	Planning and Compensation Act 1991	In Part I of Schedule 18, the entries relating to the Land Drainage Act 1976 and the Water Act 1989.

Part II – Revocations of subordinate legislation
Citation	Title	Extent of revocation
SI 1978/319	Land Drainage Act 1976 (Amendment) Regulations 1978	The whole instrument.
SI 1986/208	Local Government Act 1985 (Drainage Functions) Order 1986	In Part II of Schedule 1, paragraphs 2 to 4.
SI 1989/440	Valuation and Community Charge Tribunal (Transfer of Jurisdiction) Regulations 1989	In regulation 6(3), the words "section 79(8) of the Land Drainage Act 1976".
SI 1989/1158	Control of Pollution (Radioactive Waste) Regulations 1989	In Part II of Schedule 2, paragraph 4.
SI 1990/72	Internal Drainage Boards (Finance) Regulations 1990	In regulation 4, the words from "and accordingly" onwards.
SI 1990/214	Drainage Charges Regulations 1990	Regulations 3 and 3A. Regulations 6 to 8. Regulation 9(3). Regulation 15(1) and (3). Regulations 16 to 20. Schedule.
SI 1991/523	Internal Drainage Boards (Finance) (Amendment) Regulations 1991	The whole instrument.
SI 1991/983	Local Government Finance (Consequential Amendment) Order 1991	Regulations 3 to 5. In regulation 6, the words "and 7(4)(b)(ii)". Regulations 7 and 8.
