= Countryside and Rights of Way Act 2000 =

UK freedom to roam legislation

Countryside and Rights of Way Act (Note: Section 104(3).)
- Act of Parliament
- Parliament of the United Kingdom
- Long title: An Act to make new provision for public access to the countryside; to amend the law relating to public rights of way; to enable traffic regulation orders to be made for the purpose of conserving an area’s natural beauty; to make provision with respect to the driving of mechanically propelled vehicles elsewhere than on roads; to amend the law relating to nature conservation and the protection of wildlife; to make further provision with respect to areas of outstanding natural beauty; and for connected purposes.
- Citation: 2000 c. 37
- Territorial extent: England and Wales; Scotland (in part); (Note: Section 104(4)–(7).)

Dates
- Royal assent: 30 November 2000
- Commencement: Various (Note: Section 103.)
Other legislation
Amends	Law of Property Act 1925; National Parks and Access to the Countryside Act 1949; Occupiers' Liability Act 1957; Public Records Act 1958; Harbours Act 1964; Commons Registration Act 1965; Superannuation Act 1965; Sea Fisheries Regulation Act 1966; Parliamentary Commissioner Act 1967; Agriculture Act 1967; Forestry Act 1967; Countryside Act 1968; Conservation of Seals Act 1970; Chronically Sick and Disabled Persons Act 1970; Local Government Act 1974; House of Commons Disqualification Act 1975; Import of Live Fish (England and Wales) Act 1980; Magistrates' Courts Act 1980; Highways Act 1980; Animal Health Act 1981; Wildlife and Countryside Act 1981; Derelict Land Act 1982; Occupiers' Liability Act 1984; Road Traffic Regulation Act 1984; Inheritance Tax Act 1984; Police and Criminal Evidence Act 1984; Housing Act 1985; Agriculture Act 1986; Channel Tunnel Act 1987; Norfolk and Suffolk Broads Act 1988; Road Traffic Act 1988; Road Traffic Offenders Act 1988; Electricity Act 1989; Local Government and Housing Act 1989; Town and Country Planning Act 1990; Environmental Protection Act 1990; Deer Act 1991; Water Industry Act 1991; Land Drainage Act 1991; Transport and Works Act 1992; Protection of Badgers Act 1992; Criminal Justice and Public Order Act 1994; Environment Act 1995; Housing Act 1996; Channel Tunnel Rail Link Act 1996; Audit Commission Act 1998; Greater London Authority Act 1999; National Assembly for Wales (Transfer of Functions) Order 1999
Amended by	Police Reform Act 2002; Ministry of Agriculture, Fisheries and Food (Dissolution) Order 2002; Communications Act 2003; Criminal Justice Act 2003; Planning and Compulsory Purchase Act 2004; Natural Environment and Rural Communities Act 2006; Commons Act 2006; Conservation (Natural Habitats, &c.) (Amendment) Regulations 2007; Environmental Permitting (England and Wales) Regulations 2007; Marine and Coastal Access Act 2009; Access to the Countryside (Coastal Margin) (England) Order 2010; Postal Services Act 2011; Treaty of Lisbon (Changes in Terminology) Order 2011; Local Government Byelaws (Wales) Act 2012; Growth and Infrastructure Act 2013; Countryside and Rights of Way Act 2000 (Review of Maps) (England) Regulations 2013; Natural Resources Body for Wales (Functions) Order 2013; Local Audit and Accountability Act 2014; Planning (Wales) Act 2015; Deregulation Act 2015; Legal Aid, Sentencing and Punishment of Offenders Act 2012 (Fines on Summary Conviction) Regulations 2015; Environment (Wales) Act 2016; Countryside and Rights of Way Act 2000 (Review of Maps) (England) Regulations 2019; Local Government and Elections (Wales) Act 2021; Countryside and Rights of Way Act 2000 (Meaning of Public Body) (Wales) Regulations 2021; Historic Environment (Wales) Act 2023; Agriculture (Wales) Act 2023; Levelling-up and Regeneration Act 2023; Countryside and Rights of Way Act 2000 (Review of Maps) (Amendment) (Wales) Regulations 2023; Countryside and Rights of Way Act 2000 (Substitution of Cut-off Date Relating to Rights of Way) (England) Regulations 2023; Energy Act 2023 (Consequential Amendments) Regulations 2024; Legislation (Procedure, Publication and Repeals) (Wales) Act 2025; Town and Country Planning (Fees and Consequential Amendments) Regulations 2025; Planning (Consequential Provisions) (Wales) Act 2026; Countryside and Rights of Way Act 2000 (Review of Maps) (Amendment) (Wales) Regulations 2026
Relates to	Land Reform (Scotland) Act 2003; Wildlife and Countryside Act 1981

Status: Amended

Text of statute as originally enacted

Revised text of statute as amended

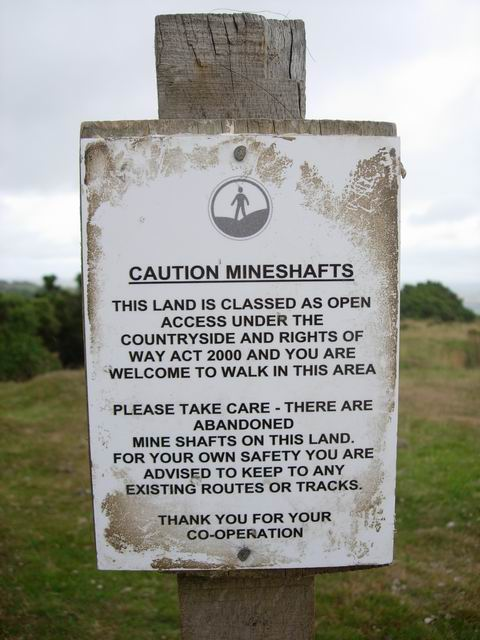
Sign on Bodmin Moor, citing the Countryside and Rights of Way Act, and noting that the land is open access. It also warns of abandoned mine shafts in the area.

The Countryside and Rights of Way Act 2000 (c. 37), also known as the CRoW Act and "Right to Roam" Act, is an act of the Parliament of the United Kingdom affecting England and Wales which came into force on 30 November 2000.

== Right to roam ==
The act implements the so-called "right to roam" (also known as jus spatiandi) long sought by the Ramblers' Association and its predecessors, on certain upland and uncultivated areas of England and Wales. This element of the act was implemented in stages as conclusive maps of different regions were produced. The act refers to areas of 'mountain, moor, heath and down' in addition to registered common land; not all uncultivated land is covered.

== Rights of way ==
A staged review of public rights of way, including limited rights to create new public footpaths where needed, is being conducted under the act. Again, this is being conducted in a staged manner, which can produce anomalies – of the two administrative areas of the County of Gloucestershire, South Gloucestershire was revised in the Southern area and the rest of Gloucestershire in the Midlands.

Some long-standing areas of dispute became accessible under the Act – these include Chrome Hill and Parkhouse Hill in the Peak District.

The act sets a deadline of 2031 to log all public footpaths, bridleways and rights of way, with a view to adding them to an official map. However, as of 2024, there was reported to be a growing backlog of applications to be processed. In December 2024, the Department for Environment, Food and Rural Affairs announced that the deadline for registration had been scrapped.

== Nature conservation ==
The act also made some changes in respect of nature conservation, in particular to Part I of the Wildlife and Countryside Act 1981. The three main changes are: the maximum penalty is now a term of imprisonment instead of a fine; the Secretary of State can designate "wildlife inspectors" who have a range of powers under the Act; offences of disturbing certain birds and animals are extended to cover reckless as well as intentional acts.

The act gave power to create local access forums (commonly referred to as 'LAFs'), comprising a balance of user, landowner and other interests, to give advice on development of access land and of the path network; the policy of footpath improvement would be set out in a Rights of Way Improvement Plan (RoWIP).

== Scotland ==
A more extensive Land Reform (Scotland) Act 2003 was enacted by the Scottish Parliament which formalised the Scottish tradition of unhindered access to open countryside, provided that care is taken not to cause damage or interfere with activities including farming and game stalking.

== See also ==
- English land law
- Freedom to roam
- Open Country – UK usage
- Rights of way in England and Wales
