= Conservation of Seals Act 1970 =

Act of the Parliament of the United Kingdom

Conservation of Seals Act 1970 (Note: Section 17(1).)
- Act of Parliament
- Parliament of the United Kingdom
- Long title: An Act to provide for the protection and conservation of seals in England and Wales and Scotland and in the adjacent territorial waters.
- Citation: 1970 c. 30
- Territorial extent: England and Wales; Scotland; (Note: Section 17(3).)

Dates
- Royal assent: 29 May 1970
- Commencement: 29 August 1970 (Note: Section 17(4).)
- Repealed: Scotland: 31 January 2011 (Note: The Marine (Scotland) Act 2010 (Commencement No. 1) Order 2010 (SI 2010/230).)
Other legislation
Amends	Criminal Justice Act 1967
Repeals/revokes	Grey Seals Protection Act 1932
Amended by	Criminal Procedure (Scotland) Act 1975; Wildlife and Countryside Act 1981; Criminal Justice Act 1982; Police and Criminal Evidence Act 1984; Countryside and Rights of Way Act 2000; Nature Conservation (Scotland) Act 2004; Natural Environment and Rural Communities Act 2006; Conservation (Natural Habitats, &c.) (Amendment) Regulations 2007; Conservation (Natural Habitats, &c.) Amendment (Scotland) Regulations 2007; Marine and Coastal Access Act 2009; Conservation of Habitats and Species Regulations 2010; Natural Resources Body for Wales (Functions) Order 2013; Higher Education and Research Act 2017; Conservation of Habitats and Species Regulations 2017; Fisheries Act 2020
Repealed by	Scotland: Marine (Scotland) Act 2010

Status: Partially repealed

Text of statute as originally enacted

Revised text of statute as amended

Text of the Conservation of Seals Act 1970 as in force today (including any amendments) within the United Kingdom, from legislation.gov.uk.

The Conservation of Seals Act 1970 (c. 30) is an act of the Parliament of the United Kingdom. It received royal assent on 29 May 1970.

== Criticism ==
In 2007 there has been a call for better seal protection by Animal Concern and the Marine Conservation Society. The animal groups claim thousands seals are killed by fishing, fish farming and salmon angling industries. Animal welfare and conservation groups have called for new legislation to protect seals in Scottish waters. The Scottish Seals Forum is being asked to back calls to the Scottish Government for a comprehensive review of the Conservation of Seals Act 1970 after severe declines in common seal populations.

== Subsequent developments ==
The whole act was repealed by for Scotland by section 130 of the Marine (Scotland) Act 2010, which came into force on 1 January 2010.

== See also ==
- Animal welfare in the United Kingdom
