= Higher Education and Research Act 2017 =

Act of the Parliament of the United Kingdom

Higher Education and Research Act 2017 (Note: Section 125(1).)
- Act of Parliament
- Parliament of the United Kingdom
- Long title: An Act to make provision about higher education and research; and to make provision about alternative payments to students in higher or further education.
- Citation: 2017 c. 29
- Introduced by: Jo Johnson, Universities Minister (Commons); James Younger, 5th Viscount Younger of Leckie (Lords)
- Territorial extent: England and Wales; Scotland (in part); Northern Ireland (in part); (Note: Section 123.)

Dates
- Royal assent: 27 April 2017
- Commencement: Various (Note: Section 124.)
Other legislation
Amends	Mining Industry Act 1926; Science and Technology Act 1965; Conservation of Seals Act 1970; Supply Powers Act 1975; House of Commons Disqualification Act 1975; Education Reform Act 1988; Water Resources Act 1991; Further and Higher Education Act 1992; Education Act 1994; Education Act 1996; Teaching and Higher Education Act 1998; Scotland Act 1998; Higher Education Act 2004; Government of Wales Act 2006; Charities Act 2011
Amended by	Higher Education (Freedom of Speech) Act 2023

Status: Amended

History of passage through Parliament

Records of Parliamentary debate relating to the statute from Hansard

Text of statute as originally enacted

Revised text of statute as amended

The Higher Education and Research Act 2017 (c. 29) is an act of the Parliament of the United Kingdom passed on 27 April 2017. It is intended to create a new regulatory framework for higher education, increase competition and student choice, ensure students receive value for money, and strengthen the research sector.

The Act is a replacement for the Further and Higher Education Act 1992 and is intended to accommodate subsequent changes in the higher education sector. Viscount Younger, the sponsor of the Bill in the House of Lords, called it "the most important legislation for the sector in 25 years", a claim supported by Universities UK, who said that it is "the first major regulatory reform" to higher education in that period.

The Act is split into four parts: Part 1 establishes the Office for Students and gives it responsibilities for regulating the Higher Education sector; Part 2 amends prior legislation on student financial support and student complaints procedures; Part 3 establishes a body called United Kingdom Research and Innovation and gives it responsibilities for regulating and funding research; and Part 4 addresses miscellaneous issues such as transitional arrangements and data sharing.

== Core provisions ==
=== Office for Students ===
The Office for Students (OfS) is established in the Act broadly as a replacement for the Higher Education Funding Council for England. The Act details requirements for appointments of the board of directors – that they reflect a diverse range of members with experience of various aspects of higher education – and outlines the main responsibilities of the OfS, leaving specific details to be developed in secondary legislation. It emphasises that the OfS should be a market regulator and protector of student interests, and specifies the post of Director for Fair Access and Participation (section 2). The Act abolishes of the official position of Director of Fair Access (section 82), meaning that the OfS will also replace the functions of the Office for Fair Access.

The Act also creates procedures for the OfS to grant degree-awarding powers to education providers, and also for granting the right of providers to use university in their titles, which will ease entry to the Higher Education market. The regulatory powers granted to the OfS go as far as allowing it to apply for a warrant to enter universities' premises, and to revoke degree awarding powers and university status, even where these were issued by Royal charter under the previous system.

The OfS is also given a funding role, with the ability to make "grants, loans or other payments to the governing body of an eligible higher education provider", and that it may attach any terms and conditions to the payments "as the OfS considers appropriate".

=== United Kingdom Research and Innovation ===
United Kingdom Research and Innovation (UKRI), established in Part 3 of the Act, brings together the country's seven research councils, replacing each of them with committees (while still using the term "councils" to refer to them) within UKRI. It is intended to strengthen interdisciplinary research, advocate for the whole research sector, and pool resources such as management and datasets. It gives the government the ability to set the direction of future research by maintaining a level of control over budgets of the individual councils, while still allowing a level of autonomy on how money is allocated to research projects.

=== Alternative payments and the student complaints scheme ===
The Act amends previous legislation, replacing instances of the word "loan" with "loan, or alternative payment". While not explicitly mentioned in the Act, this is to support the issuance of sharia-compliant payments by the Student Loans Company.

The Office of the Independent Adjudicator's role in handling student complaints is expanded under Part 2 of the Act to cover any higher education provider on the OfS's register.

== Introduction of the Bill ==
The Government published a white paper titled Success as a Knowledge Economy on 16 May 2016. The paper proposed a new regulatory system, headed by an Office for Students, and gave more detail on the future of the recently introduced Teaching Excellence Framework (TEF), and how it would be linked with tuition fees. It also proposed merging the existing seven research councils into a single body, UK Research and Innovation. It proposed procedures for new providers entering the market, with substantially fewer hurdles. It also proposed a national register of students' unions, which would give students who encountered issues greater mechanisms for redress.

On 18 May 2016, the week after the publication of the white paper, the State Opening of Parliament Queen's speech announced new legislation "to support the establishment of new universities and to promote choice and competition across the higher education sector". The next day, the Higher Education and Research Bill had its first reading in the United Kingdom House of Commons.

== Passage through Parliament ==
The Bill was introduced to the Commons for its first reading by Jo Johnson, the Minister for Universities and Science. Even before the Bill's second reading, substantial opposition was forecast, with one Vice-Chancellor predicting that it would not get through the House of Commons without significant amendment, and Gordon Marsden, the Shadow Secretary for higher education, voiced concerns that the Brexit Referendum result meant that the Bill should be shelved.

At the committee stage, amendments were proposed by the Opposition including the renaming of the Office for Students, requiring that de-registration of higher education providers be supported by secondary legislation and changing the metrics by which teaching is measured. All opposition amendments were rejected at the Commons committee stage and the Bill passed through the House of Commons after the third reading on 21 November.

The Bill was sponsored in the House of Lords by Viscount Younger, and they made their own amendments to the Bill. They voted that there should be additional constraints for entry to the higher education market to prevent profit-motivated providers gaining access too easily, to the detriment of students and the sector. They also voted that the TEF should not be used to create a consolidated ranking of universities, and that its metrics should be subject to additional oversight.

The snap general election meant that Parliament had to be dissolved, and so the Labour Party reached an agreement with the Government to vote for a version of the Bill with substantially reduced amendments as part of the wash-up period. The linking of the TEF to tuition fees was to be delayed, but not prevented altogether, and the OfS would be required to consult the Quality Assurance Agency for Higher Education before awarding the use of the university title.

The amended Bill was voted on in both houses on 27 April 2017, then received royal assent as the Higher Education and Research Act later that day.

== Reception ==
As the Bill passed through parliament, it was widely criticised within the sector. The National Union of Students (NUS) were opposed to what they called the "marketisation of HE", stating that "a climate of competition will never be in students’ best interests", and were also concerned about the link between measured teaching quality and rises in tuition fees. The amount of regulatory muscle given to the OfS, in having the authority to de-register universities, was criticised, as was the ease with which for-profit education providers could enter the market.

Baroness Wolf, previously an adviser to the government, expressed concern that "sweeping general legislation might make it easier to set up a really small, innovative, educationally wonderful institution, but it’s much more likely to mean we end up with the American-style catastrophe". Nick Hillman of the Higher Education Policy Institute think tank has long been in favour of legislation to support new universities, but said that even he thought the speed with which they could be approved under the new legislation was "a risk too far".

Others have pointed to the lack of subject diversity that the likely influx private providers will offer. Cambridge professor Gill Evans stated that "they tend to go for what can be taught cheaply to a mass market", and that the majority of current private providers are only offering courses up to level 5, rather than full degrees.

The government has hit back at critics, with Jo Johnson saying existing universities are merely afraid of competition, and are "acting like bouncers deciding who should and should not be let into the club". The government position is that the increased competition, and the link between teaching quality and tuition fees, will force existing universities to improve.

Outside of the government, the legislation has had its supporters. Notably, Universities UK and GuildHE, both influential bodies representing university leadership, expressed their support in a joint letter to their respective members. They welcomed the change, stating that "current regulatory framework has not kept up" with changes within the HE sector. Even the NUS, otherwise fierce critics of the changes, expressed support for the provision of sharia-compliant loans supported by the legislation.
