= Postal Services Act 2011 =

Act of the Parliament of the United Kingdom

Postal Services Act 2011 (Note: Section 93(1).)
- Act of Parliament
- Parliament of the United Kingdom
- Long title: An Act to make provision for the restructuring of the Royal Mail group and about the Royal Mail Pension Plan; to make new provision about the regulation of postal services, including provision for a special administration regime; and for connected purposes.
- Citation: 2011 c. 5
- Introduced by: Vince Cable MP, Secretary of State for Business, Innovation and Skills (Commons); Baroness Wilcox (Lords)
- Territorial extent: United Kingdom (Note: Section 93(6).)

Dates
- Royal assent: 13 June 2011
- Commencement: Section 43, schedule 4, section 66, schedule 9, sections 89–90, section 91 (3)&(4) and sections 92–93 on 13 June 2011 (Note: Section 93(2).); section 64 (2)-(6) on 15 September 2011; remaining sections on 1 October 2011 (Note: Section 93(3). The Postal Services Act 2011 (Commencement No. 1 and Transitional Provisions) Order 2011.); section 1 on 20 December 2011 (Note: Section 93(3). The Postal Services Act 2011 (Commencement No. 2) Order 2011.)
Other legislation
| Amends | List: Commissioners Clauses Act 1847; Improvement of Land Act 1864; Bills of Exchange Act 1882; Congested Districts (Scotland) Act 1897; Law of Property Act 1925; Execution of Diligence (Scotland) Act 1926; Acquisition of Land (Authorisation Procedure) (Scotland) Act 1947; London County Council (General Powers) Act 1957; Opencast Coal Act 1958; Public Records Act 1958; City of London (Various Powers) Act 1967; Forestry Act 1967; Parliamentary Commissioner Act 1967; National Loans Act 1968; Greater London Council (General Powers) Act 1969; Post Office Act 1969; Greater London Council (General Powers) Act 1970; Pensions (Increase) Act 1971; Control of Pollution Act 1974; Solicitors Act 1974; House of Commons Disqualification Act 1975; Northern Ireland Assembly Disqualification Act 1975; Welsh Development Agency Act 1975; Local Government (Miscellaneous Provisions) Act 1976; Ancient Monuments and Archaeological Areas Act 1979; Highways Act 1980; Local Government, Planning and Land Act 1980; Acquisition of Land Act 1981; Forgery and Counterfeiting Act 1981; Greater London Council (General Powers) Act 1981; New Towns Act 1981; Civil Aviation Act 1982; Mental Health Act 1983; Representation of the People Act 1983; Building Act 1984; Administration of Justice Act 1985; Insolvency Act 1986; Housing (Scotland) Act 1987; Housing Act 1988; Local Government Finance Act 1988; Planning (Hazardous Substances) Act 1990; Planning (Listed Buildings and Conservation Areas) Act 1990; Town and Country Planning Act 1990; Coal Mining Subsidence Act 1991; Land Drainage Act 1991; Water Industry Act 1991; Water Resources Act 1991; Social Security Administration Act 1992; Social Security Administration (Northern Ireland) Act 1992; Taxation of Chargeable Gains Act 1992; Criminal Procedure (Scotland) Act 1995; Merchant Shipping Act 1995; Local Government and Rating Act 1997; Planning (Hazardous Substances) (Scotland) Act 1997; Planning (Listed Buildings and Conservation Areas) (Scotland) Act 1997; Town and Country Planning (Scotland) Act 1997; Competition Act 1998; Northern Ireland Act 1998; Regional Development Agencies Act 1998; Greater London Authority Act 1999; Countryside and Rights of Way Act 2000; Freedom of Information Act 2000; Political Parties, Elections and Referendums Act 2000; Regulation of Investigatory Powers Act 2000; Postal Services Act 2000; Anti-terrorism, Crime and Security Act 2001; Enterprise Act 2002; Office of Communications Act 2002; Railways and Transport Safety Act 2003; Communications Act 2003; Water Act 2003; London Local Authorities Act 2004; London Local Authorities Act 2004; Railways Act 2005; Legislative and Regulatory Reform Act 2006; Consumer, Estate Agents and Redress Act 2007; Legal Services Act 2007; London Local Authorities Act 2007; Regulatory Enforcement and Sanctions Act 2008 |
| Amended by | Financial Services Act 2012; Enterprise and Regulatory Reform Act 2013; Public Bodies (The Office of Fair Trading Transfer of Consumer Advice Scheme Function and Modification of Enforcement Functions) Order 2013; Enterprise and Regulatory Reform Act 2013 (Competition) (Consequential, Transitional and Saving Provisions) Order 2014; Transfer of Functions (Royal Mail Pension Plan) Order 2014; Public Bodies (Abolition of the National Consumer Council and Transfer of the Office of Fair Trading’s Functions in relation to Estate Agents etc) Order 2014; Scotland Act 2016; Digital Economy Act 2017; Postal and Parcel Services (Amendment etc.) (EU Exit) Regulations 2018; Cross-border Parcel Delivery Services (EU Information Requirements) Regulations 2019; Cross-border Parcel Delivery Services (Amendment) (No.2) (EU Exit) Regulations 2020; Consumer Scotland Act 2020 (Consequential Provisions and Modifications) Order 2022; Non-Domestic Rating Act 2023; Retained EU Law (Revocation and Reform) Act 2023 (Consequential Amendment) Regulations 2023; Digital Markets, Competition and Consumers Act 2024 |

Status: Amended

History of passage through Parliament

Text of statute as originally enacted

Revised text of statute as amended

The Postal Services Act 2011 (c. 5) is an act of the Parliament of the United Kingdom. The act enabled the British Government to sell shares in Royal Mail to private investors and included the possible mutualisation of the Post Office.

== Provisions ==
The act allowed private buyers to own up to 90% of Royal Mail, with Royal Mail staff being offered at least 10% of the shares of the company. It enabled the Post Office business to be separated from Royal Mail, to allow it to remain in government ownership or to be mutualised. It provided for the government to take over the assets and liabilities of the Royal Mail pension scheme, which had a considerable deficit. It allowed for the transfer of regulatory responsibility from Postcomm to the communications regulator Ofcom. The act also wrote into law the requirement for Royal Mail to maintain a six day a week universal service.

During its passage through the House of Commons, the government added an amendment to include a guarantee that a silhouette or portrait of the monarch's head would remain on British postage stamps even if the Royal Mail were to be taken into foreign ownership. Following this stage it was considered by the House of Lords, and the government added further amendments to safeguard the universal service.

The act was granted royal assent on 13 June 2011 and the majority of its provisions came into force on 1 October 2011.

=== Summary of main provisions ===
1. It provides, amongst other things, for the responsibility for regulation for postal services to move from the existing regulator, Postcomm, to Ofcom.
2. As part of the transition, there are a number of things which Ofcom either must do, or has the discretionary power to do. It also replaces the existing licensing regime with a general authorisation regime. The general authorisation regime came into effect on 1 October 2011.
  - Ofcom may provisionally designate a universal service provider.
  - Ofcom may approve a consumer redress scheme and require postal operators to be a member of that scheme.
  - Ofcom must, in effect, transpose the existing licence conditions into initial conditions to apply under the general authorisation, including, as appropriate, consumer protection conditions.
  - Ofcom may prepare a statement of the principles that it proposed to apply in fixing administrative charges.
  - Ofcom must prepare and publish a statement of policy on information gathering for that year.
