= Environment (Wales) Act 2016 =

Environment (Wales) Act 2016 (Note: Section 89.)
- Act of the National Assembly for Wales
- National Assembly for Wales
- Long title: An Act of the National Assembly for Wales to promote sustainable management of natural resources; to provide for targets for reducing emissions of greenhouse gases; to reform the law on charges for carrier bags; to provide for the separate collection of waste, prohibit disposal of food waste to sewers and provide for prohibiting or regulating disposal of waste by incineration; to make provision about several and regulated fisheries for shellfish; to make provision about fees for marine licences; to establish the Flood and Coastal Erosion Committee; and to make minor changes to the law about land drainage and byelaws made by the Natural Resources Body for Wales.
- Citation: 2016 anaw 3
- Introduced by: Carl Sargeant
- Territorial extent: Wales

Dates
- Royal assent: 21 March 2016
- Commencement: various (Note: Section 88.)

Other legislation
- Amends: Sea Fisheries (Shellfish) Act 1967; Water Industry Act 1991; Water Resources Act 1991; Land Drainage Act 1991; Countryside and Rights of Way Act 2000; Government of Wales Act 2006
- Amended by: Local Government and Elections (Wales) Act 2021Environment (Wales) Act 2016 (Public Authorities subject to the Biodiversity and Resilience of Ecosystems Duty) Regulations 2021; Agriculture (Wales) Act 2023; Energy Act 2023 (Consequential Amendments) Regulations 2024

Status: Amended

History of passage through the Assembly

Text of statute as originally enacted

Revised text of statute as amended

Text of the Environment (Wales) Act 2016 as in force today (including any amendments) within the United Kingdom, from legislation.gov.uk.

The Environment (Wales) Act 2016 (anaw 3) (Welsh: Deddf yr Amgylchedd (Cymru) 2016) is an act of the National Assembly for Wales that was given royal assent on 21 March 2016. It put into place the necessary legislation to enable the planning and management of the natural resources of Wales in a more sustainable, pro-active and joined-up way than was previously possible.

== Parts ==
The act has seven main parts:

- Part 1: Sustainable management of natural resources
- Part 2: Climate change
- Part 3: Charges for carrier bags
- Part 4: Collection and disposal of waste
- Part 5: Fisheries for shellfish
- Part 6: Marine licensing
- Part 7: Flood and coastal erosion committee

=== Part 1 Sustainable management of natural resources ===
Part 1 of the act lays out the approach to be taken by Wales in planning for and managing its natural capital assets and its resources at both a national and a local level in line with the statutory 'principles of sustainable management of natural resources', as defined within the act.

Section 6 of this part puts a duty onto public bodies and local authorities to 'maintain and enhance biodiversity' in a manner consistent with the exercising of their normal roles and functions. Whilst doing this, public authorities are also obliged to 'promote the resilience of ecosystems'. This legal duty supersedes the biodiversity duty outlined in section 40 of the Natural Environment and Rural Communities Act 2006 (NERC Act 2006) which was relevant to both England and Wales. However, the obligation still applies to those public authorities in Wales to which the NERC Act 2006 duty applied. It also requires those bodies to have regard to the lists of habitats and species of 'principal importance' published as a result of section 7 of the Environment (Wales) Act 2016. Each public body must report at least every three years on how it is complying with the biodiversity duty.

Section 7 requires Welsh Ministers to publish and maintain lists of species and habitats in Wales that are regarded as of 'principal importance' for the purpose of maintaining and enhancing it biodiversity. This part of the act replaces the duty outlined in section 42 of the NERC Act 2006.

=== Part 2 Climate change ===
This part of the act places an obligation on Welsh Ministers to reduce greenhouse gas emissions from Wales such that in the year 2050 they are at least 80% lower than baseline figures for 1990 or 1995 (dependent upon which greenhouse gas is being measured).

=== Part 3 Carrier bags ===
Part 3 of the act empowers ministers to draw up regulations requiring certain sellers of goods to charge for carrier bags, and places an obligation on those regulations to ensure that the proceeds are directed towards charitable purposes, as defined by the Charities Act 2011.

=== Part 4 Collection and disposal of waste ===
Part 4 of the act relates to issues surrounding the prohibition of discharge of food waste into public sewers, or by incineration, general waste collection, and a code of practice relating to this part of the act.

=== Parts 5 and 6 ===
Parts 5 of the act relate to fisheries (particularly shellfish) and to protection of the marine environment. It creates powers for ministers to serve or revoke protection notices in European marine sites as defined in the Conservation of Habitats and Species Regulations 2010 (SI 2010/490), whilst part 6 relates to marine licensing.

=== Part 7 Miscellaneous ===
The final part of the Environment (Wales) Act 2016 relates to various issues, including the establishment and powers of the Flood and Coastal Erosion Committee for Wales, matters relating to land drainage, and to minor amendments of prior legislation relating to Natural Resources Wales.

== See also ==
- List of acts and measures of Senedd Cymru
- Wildlife and Natural Environment (Scotland) Act 2011
