= Land Drainage Act 1991 =

Act of the Parliament of the United Kingdom

Land Drainage Act 1991 (Note: Section 76(1).)
- Act of Parliament
- Parliament of the United Kingdom
- Long title: An Act to consolidate the enactments relating to internal drainage boards, and to the functions of such boards and of local authorities in relation to land drainage, with amendments to give effect to recommendations of the Law Commission.
- Citation: 1991 c. 59
- Territorial extent: England and Wales (Note: Section 76(3).)

Dates
- Royal assent: 25 July 1991
- Commencement: 1 December 1991 (Note: Section 76(2).)

Other legislation
- Amends: See § Repealed enactments
- Repeals/revokes: See § Repealed enactments
- Amended by: Local Government (Wales) Act 1994; Coal Industry Act 1994; Land Drainage Act 1994; Merchant Shipping Act 1995; Environment Act 1995; Gas Act 1995; Secretary of State for the Environment, Transport and the Regions Order 1997; Development Commission (Transfer of Functions and Miscellaneous Provisions) Order 1999; Countryside and Rights of Way Act 2000; Communications Act 2003; Water Act 2003; Transport for London (Consequential Provisions) Order 2003; Energy Act 2004; Constitutional Reform Act 2005; Natural Environment and Rural Communities Act 2006; Enterprise Act 2002 (Disqualification from Office: General) Order 2006; Tribunals, Courts and Enforcement Act 2007; Local Government and Public Involvement in Health Act 2007; Transfer of Tribunal Functions (Lands Tribunal and Miscellaneous Amendments) Order 2009; Flood and Water Management Act 2010; Postal Services Act 2011; Local Government Byelaws (Wales) Act 2012; Natural Resources Body for Wales (Functions) Order 2013; Transfer of Tribunal Functions Order 2013; Water Act 2014; Deregulation Act 2015; Environment (Wales) Act 2016; Housing and Planning Act 2016; Environment Act 2021; Criminal Justice Act 2003 (Commencement No. 33) and Sentencing Act 2020 (Commencement No. 2) Regulations 2022; Judicial Review and Courts Act 2022 (Magistrates' Court Sentencing Powers) Regulations 2023; Historic Environment (Wales) Act 2023; Energy Act 2023 (Consequential Amendments) Regulations 2024
- Relates to: Water Resources Act 1991; Water Industry Act 1991; Statutory Water Companies Act 1991; Water Consolidation (Consequential Provisions) Act 1991

Status: Amended

Records of Parliamentary debate relating to the statute from Hansard

Text of statute as originally enacted

Revised text of statute as amended

Text of the Land Drainage Act 1991 as in force today (including any amendments) within the United Kingdom, from legislation.gov.uk.

The Land Drainage Act 1991 (c. 59) is an act of the Parliament of the United Kingdom that consolidates legislation relating to internal drainage boards. It is organised into five parts, with part I containing 13 sections relating to the functions of internal drainage boards. Part II has 18 sections dealing with provisions for facilitating and securing the drainage of land. Part III contains four sections on powers to modify existing obligations, Part IV has 26 sections covering financial provisions, while part V has 15 miscellaneous and supplemental sections. These are followed by six schedules.

The enactments consolidated by the act were repealed by section 3 of, and schedule 3 to, the Water Consolidation (Consequential Provisions) Act 1991.

== Background ==
Prior to the 1930s, land drainage in the United Kingdom was regulated by the Statute of Sewers (23 Hen. 8. c. 5), passed by King Henry VIII in 1531, and several further acts which built upon that foundation. However, there was some dissatisfaction with these powers, as although there were administrative bodies with powers to manage the drainage of low-lying areas, they did not have sufficient resources to do this effectively. Existing drainage boards and those who lived and worked in the areas they covered made complaints to the Ministry of Agriculture and Fisheries during the 1920s, and the government decided that a thorough review of the situation should be carried out.

This led to the passing of the Land Drainage Act 1930 (20 & 21 Geo. 5. c. 44). One unusual aspect of the act was that it repealed most of the legislation that had preceded it. In total, 16 acts dating from 1531 to 1929 were repealed, and three others were amended. The process of consolidating legislation was continued by the Land Drainage Act 1976 and by this act of 1991.

The Water Resources Act 1991 was passed on the same day as the Land Drainage Act 1991, and together they defined a tiered system for land drainage in England and Wales. The top tier consisted of Central Government, the Ministry of Agriculture, Fisheries and Food, and the Welsh Office. Both the Department of the Environment and the Welsh Office had an important function concerning works which involve planning permission. The second tier is the Environment Agency, which has to supervise all aspects of flood defence, but must delegate its own land drainage functions to others. The third tier consists of Regional Flood Defence Committees, who usually delegate responsibility to local flood defence committees. Internal drainage boards comprise the fourth tier. These were originally set up to manage drainage in specific areas where it was necessary. They are responsible for supervision of all drainage matters within their geographical area. Tier five consists of internal drainage districts, which are areas within the area managed by a regional flood defence committee where land drainage will be beneficial or prevent danger. Finally, there are a number of local authorities and sometimes local commissioners, who have long-standing powers to make or maintain land drainage works, and these form tier six.

== Outworking ==
As a result of the Water Act 1989, some of the powers and duties which were formerly the remit of water authorities were transferred to the National Rivers Authority. They then passed to the Environment Agency, as a result of the Environment Act 1995. Despite these changes, the powers and duties of land drainage authorities remained largely unchanged. The Land Drainage Act 1991 did not add any additional duties to their remit, since the purpose of the act was to consolidate previous legislation. Section 14 of the act required internal drainage boards to supervise all aspects of land drainage within their area. They could also carry out work on all watercourses, but those powers were permissive, and so most internal drainage boards decided which watercourses they would maintain regularly, leaving the rest to be managed by riparian owners. When the Land Drainage Act 1994 was passed, sections 12 and 13 of the 1991 act were repealed. These related to environmental and recreational duties, including those for areas of special interest. They were replaced by a new part IVA, containing five sections detailing enhanced environmental and recreational duties.

Internal drainage boards raised their finance in various ways. They could collect drainage rates from owners of agricultural land and buildings, and could also levy local authorities, where land and buildings which did not qualify for agricultural rates benefitted from the activities of the board. Where an internal drainage board had to maintain pumping stations and watercourses to cope with water that entered the district from upland areas, section 57 of the act allowed them to obtain a contribution for their maintenance from the Environment Agency. They could also obtain contributions from developers, where a development would result in extra water entering the drainage system. Where the internal drainage board considered that an improvement scheme was necessary, they could obtain up to 25 percent of the capital cost as a grant from the Ministry of Agriculture, Fisheries and Food.

Where an internal drainage district existed, local authorities had been granted permissive powers which were similar to those under which internal drainage boards operated. However, an internal drainage board could provide a drainage service to agricultural land, whereas local authorities could only provide flood protection. However this distinction is no longer as clear as it was, since subsequent legislation, notably the Environment Act 1995, stated that the management of water levels was part of the function of flood defence.

== Bibliography ==
- Dobson, Alban; Hull, Hubert (1931). The Land Drainage Act 1930. Oxford University Press.
- Howarth, William; McGillivray, Donald (1996). Land drainage and flood defence responsibilities (3rd ed.). Institution of Civil Engineers / Thomas Telford. ISBN 978-0-7277-2508-0.
