= Protection of Badgers Act 1992 =

Act of the Parliament of the United Kingdom

Protection of Badgers Act 1992 (Note: Section 15(1).)
- Act of Parliament
- Parliament of the United Kingdom
- Long title: An Act to consolidate the Badgers Act 1973, the Badgers Act 1991 and the Badgers (Further Protection) Act 1991.
- Citation: 1992 c. 51
- Territorial extent: England and Wales; Scotland; (Note: Section 15(4).)

Dates
- Royal assent: 16 July 1992
- Commencement: 16 October 1992 (Note: Section 15(3).)

Other legislation
- Amends: See § Repealed enactments
- Repeals/revokes: See § Repealed enactments
- Amended by: Planning (Consequential Provisions) (Scotland) Act 1997; Countryside and Rights of Way Act 2000; Protection of Wild Mammals (Scotland) Act 2002; Ministry of Agriculture, Fisheries and Food (Dissolution) Order 2002; Courts Act 2003; Hunting Act 2004; Nature Conservation (Scotland) Act 2004; Natural Environment and Rural Communities Act 2006; Wildlife and Natural Environment (Scotland) Act 2011; Natural Resources Body for Wales (Functions) Order 2013; Criminal Justice (Scotland) Act 2016; Animals and Wildlife (Penalties, Protections and Powers) (Scotland) Act 2020; Historic Environment (Wales) Act 2023; Planning and Infrastructure Act 2025

Status: Amended

Text of statute as originally enacted

Revised text of statute as amended

Text of the Protection of Badgers Act 1992 as in force today (including any amendments) within the United Kingdom, from legislation.gov.uk.

The Protection of Badgers Act 1992 (c. 51) is an act of the Parliament of the United Kingdom that consolidated enactments related to the protection of badgers in Great Britain.

== Provisions ==
=== Repealed enactments ===
Section 15(2) of the act repealed 9 enactments, listed in the schedule to the act.

Enactments repealed by section 15(2)
Citation	Short title	Extent of repeal
1973 c. 57	Badgers Act 1973	The whole act.
1981 c. 69	Wildlife and Countryside Act 1981	Section 73(4).
1981 c. 69	Wildlife and Countryside Act 1981	In Schedule 7, paragraphs 8 to 12.
1985 c. 31	Wildlife and Countryside (Amendment) Act 1985	Section 1.
1986 c. 14	Animals (Scientific Procedures) Act 1986	In Schedule 3, paragraph 9.
1990 c. 43	Environmental Protection Act 1990	In Schedule 9, paragraph 6.
1991 c. 28	Natural Heritage (Scotland) Act 1991	In Schedule 2, paragraph 5.
1991 c. 35	Badgers (Further Protection) Act 1991	The whole act.
1991 c. 36	Badgers Act 1991	The whole act.
1991 c. 53	Criminal Justice Act 1991	Section 26(3).
