= Water Resources Act 1991 =

Act of the Parliament of the United Kingdom

Water Resources Act 1991 (Note: Section 225(1).)
- Act of Parliament
- Parliament of the United Kingdom
- Long title: An Act to consolidate enactments relating to the National Rivers Authority and the matters in relation to which it exercises functions, with amendments to give effect to recommendations of the Law Commission
- Citation: 1991 c. 57
- Territorial extent: England and Wales (Note: Section 225(3).)

Dates
- Royal assent: 25 July 1991
- Commencement: 1 December 1991 (Note: Section 225(2).)
Other legislation
| Amends | Gas Act 1965 |
| Amended by | List: Local Government (Wales) Act 1994; Coal Industry Act 1994; Waste Management Licensing Regulations 1994; Merchant Shipping Act 1995; Environment Act 1995; Gas Act 1995; Environment Act 1995 (Consequential Amendments) Regulations 1996; Environment Act 1995 (Consequential and Transitional Provisions) (Scotland) Regulations 1996; Secretary of State for the Environment, Transport and the Regions Order 1997; Competition Act 1998; Pollution Prevention and Control Act 1999; Competition Act 1998 (Competition Commission) Transitional, Consequential and Supplemental Provisions Order 1999; Land Registration Act 2002; Enterprise Act 2002 (repealed); Railways and Transport Safety Act 2003; Communications Act 2003; Water Act 2003; Criminal Justice Act 2003; Transport for London (Consequential Provisions) Order 2003; Stamp Duty Land Tax (Consequential Amendment of Enactments) Regulations 2003; Energy Act 2004; Fire and Rescue Services Act 2004; Constitutional Reform Act 2005; Railways Act 2005; Church of England (Miscellaneous Provisions) Measure 2006; Natural Environment and Rural Communities Act 2006; Restricted Byways (Application and Consequential Amendment of Provisions) Regulations 2006; Tribunals, Courts and Enforcement Act 2007; Planning and Compulsory Purchase Act 2004 (Corresponding Amendments) Order 2007; Environmental Permitting (England and Wales) Regulations 2007; Housing and Regeneration Act 2008; Legislative Reform (Health and Safety Executive) Order 2008; Consumer Protection from Unfair Trading Regulations 2008; Marine and Coastal Access Act 2009; Transfer of Tribunal Functions (Lands Tribunal and Miscellaneous Amendments) Order 2009; Environmental Permitting (England and Wales) (Amendment) Regulations 2009; Water Resources Act 1991 (Amendment) (England and Wales) Regulations 2009; Flood and Water Management Act 2010; Environmental Permitting (England and Wales) Regulations 2010; Postal Services Act 2011; Localism Act 2011; Treaty of Lisbon (Changes in Terminology) Order 2011; Civil Aviation Act 2012; Financial Services Act 2012; British Waterways Board (Transfer of Functions) Order 2012; Crime and Courts Act 2013; Growth and Infrastructure Act 2013; Energy Act 2013; Natural Resources Body for Wales (Functions) Order 2013; Water Act 2014; Enterprise and Regulatory Reform Act 2013 (Competition) (Consequential, Transitional and Saving Provisions) Order 2014; Planning (Wales) Act 2015; Deregulation Act 2015; Legal Aid, Sentencing and Punishment of Offenders Act 2012 (Fines on Summary Conviction) Regulations 2015; Office of Rail Regulation (Change of Name) Regulations 2015; Environment (Wales) Act 2016; Housing and Planning Act 2016; Environmental Permitting (England and Wales) (Amendment) (No. 2) Regulations 2016; Bankruptcy (Scotland) Act 2016 (Consequential Provisions and Modifications) Order 2016; Environmental Permitting (England and Wales) Regulations 2016; Higher Education and Research Act 2017; Digital Economy Act 2017; Bank of England and Financial Services (Consequential Amendments) Regulations 2017; Water Act 2014 (Consequential Amendments etc.) Order 2017; Environment, Food and Rural Affairs (Miscellaneous Amendments and Revocations) Regulations 2018; Floods and Water (Amendment etc.) (EU Exit) Regulations 2019; Fisheries Act 2020; Local Government and Elections (Wales) Act 2021; Environment Act 2021; Retained EU Law (Revocation and Reform) Act 2023 (Consequential Amendment) Regulations 2023; Water (Special Measures) Act 2025; Digital Markets, Competition and Consumers Act 2024 (Consequential Amendments) Regulations 2025; Planning (Consequential Provisions) (Wales) Act 2026 |
| Relates to | Water Industry Act 1991; Statutory Water Companies Act 1991; Water Consolidation (Consequential Provisions) Act 1991; Land Drainage Act 1991 |

Status: Amended

Records of Parliamentary debate relating to the statute from Hansard

Text of statute as originally enacted

Revised text of statute as amended

Text of the Water Resources Act 1991 as in force today (including any amendments) within the United Kingdom, from legislation.gov.uk.

The Water Resources Act 1991 (c. 57) (WRA) is an act of the Parliament of the United Kingdom that regulates water resources, water quality and pollution, and flood defence. Part II of the act provides the general structure for the management of water resources. Part III explains the standards expected for controlled waters; and what is considered to be water pollution. Part IV provides information on mitigation through flood defence.

The enactments consolidated by the act were repealed by section 3 of, and schedule 3 to, the Water Consolidation (Consequential Provisions) Act 1991.

== Background ==
The act was introduced in December 1991 along with four other pieces of legislation (Water Industry Act 1991, Land Drainage Act 1991, Statutory Water Companies Act 1991 and the Water (Consequential Provisions) Act 1991) whose combined purpose was to consolidate existing water legislation, which was previously spread out over 20 separate pieces of legislation. The act governs the quality and quantity of water by outlining the functions of the Environment Agency (previously the National Rivers Authority). The WRA sets out offences relating to water, discharge consents, and possible defences to the offences. The Environment Agency has the power to bring criminal charges against people or companies responsible for crimes concerning water.

== Part II – resource management ==
The WRA explains that the duty of the Agency is to “so far as is reasonably practicable” maintain, with water undertakers, secure and proper management of any reservoirs, apparatus or other works which belong to and are operated and controlled by them. The Agency will alert water undertakers as to any arrangements made by the Secretary of State or the Director General of Water Services, and any such arrangements made by them will be enforceable under section 18 of the act

== Part III – quality objectives ==
The legal framework for meeting quality standards for the environment is found within s82 to s84. The duty of the Secretary of State (currently the Secretary of State for Environment, Food and Rural Affairs) is to ‘prescribe a system of classifying the quality of those waters’. Under s.82, classification regulations provide the standards that must be met for controlled waters to be under a specific classification. In relation to this, the act provides reference to the purposes of the water, substances within the water or absent from it and requirements as to other characteristics. Under s83, water quality objectives for controlled waters are created by the Secretary of State. Water quality standards provide goals for the Environment Agency to exercise its functions under s84 and to further maintain the quality objectives for controlled waters.

Practical evaluation systems known as General Quality Assessments (GQAs) were established by the Environment Agency in attempts to monitor inland waters by testing both biological and chemical substances which could affect the overall health of the surrounding ecosystems. In addition, nutrient sampling is undertaken in the assessments by the Environment Agency to establish whether natural biological waste from runoff in nearby areas is causing a significant change in the water quality. It has been argued that, although the monitoring system can be viewed as an improvement in water regulation, no enforcement techniques are in place to punish those with low-quality GQA results.

== Section 85: the main water pollution offence ==
Basic outline - Discharge consents are required by the Environment Agency from companies who ‘discharge sewage or trade effluent directly into surface water, such as rivers, streams, canals, groundwater or the sea’. Consents are set and enforced on an individual basis with regard to quality of the water source and the surrounding catchment. Other factors taken into account include the location and abstraction points used for public water supplies. Water companies are now bound by statutory enforcement to produce 25 year water resource management plans.

Section 85 of the WRA is concerned with the offence of polluting controlled water. The purpose of the section is to impose criminal liability on those who pollute natural water resources. The main offence states that it is an offence to cause or knowingly permit poisonous, noxious, or polluting matter or any solid waste to enter any controlled waters. Further offences, for example, a breach of conditions in a discharge consent, are also introduced by s.85.

This is a strict liability offence; intention or negligence by the defendant is not required for the offence to be committed, as illustrated by the word ‘cause’. The second component of the offence, ‘knowingly permit’ is used less frequently in prosecutions, as it requires proof of intention in order for the defendant to be liable. The Environment Agency or a private individual or association may bring prosecutions under Section 85. Section 85 does not define the words poisonous, noxious, or polluting; therefore leaving the words open to flexible definition by the courts. Controlled waters are defined in section 104 of the act and include territorial, coastal, inland and ground waters. (ref Water Resources Act 1991 s.104). The penalties for contravention of s. 85, range from a term of imprisonment not exceeding 3 months or a fine not exceeding £20,000 or both. Infringements that are more serious can carry penalties of imprisonment not exceeding two years, an unlimited fine, or both.

== Prosecutions ==
In Alphacell v Woodward [1972] 2 All ER 475, it was found that the prosecution only have to show there was some underlying operation to cause pollution. There is no need for the prosecution to show the defendant was negligent or at fault. A number cases followed that introduced requirements for some positive act on the part of the defendant (e.g. Wychavon District Council v National Rivers Authority [1993] Env LR 230, and found that the act of a third party, for example a vandal breaking a tap on a fuel tank, could break the chain of causation (Impress (Worcestor) Ltd v Rees [1971] 2 All ER 357). However, in the case of Empress Car Company (Abertillery) v National Rivers Authority [1998] Env LR 396, it was held that the law had taken a wrong turn and had to go back to the Alphacell v Woodward approach. The idea of a positive act was unnecessary and the underlying operation is that the defendant must do something. The test for whether the actions of third parties could break the chain of causation was whether the intervening event was a normal and familiar fact of life or an abnormal and extraordinary event. In R v RL and JF (2008) the 100+ members of an unincorporated golf club, as well as the club itself, were prosecuted under the strict liability theory for causing contractors' works which polluted a watercourse near their golf course. The Crown Court had ruled that the club could be prosecuted but not the members, but the Court of Appeal overruled this and stated that the Crown was entitled to decide who should be prosecuted in each case.

=== De-criminalisation/reform ===
Commentators have highlighted a number of rationales for the imposition of strict liability; to act as a deterrent, to promote the public interest goal in preventing environmental harm and to promote the polluter pays principle. Nonetheless, as strict liability offences require no mental responsibility or fault, art of an offence, this can lead to criminalising innocent or accidental actions.

Due to a growing dissatisfaction with existing criminal sanctions, alternative sanctions have been considered such as naming and shaming polluters, fixed monetary penalties, discretionary requirements, and enforcement undertakings.

== Preventive powers ==
S.92 – Requirements to take precautions against pollution; The Secretary of State has the power to take precautions to make regulations concerning precautionary measures in relation to any poisonous, noxious or polluting matter to prevent it from entering controlled waters. As a result of these powers the Silage, Slurry, Agricultural and Fuel Oil Regulations 1991 were enacted to aid the control and prevention of pollution e.g. through new storage systems for slurry.

S.93 – Water Protection Zones; The Secretary of State may designate water protection zones, where appropriate for prohibiting or carrying on in that area of activities which the Secretary of State considers likely to result in water pollution. This enables the Environment Agency to exercise control over pesticides and other potential pollutants within the zones.

S.94 – 95 – Nitrate Sensitive Areas and Agreements in Nitrate Sensitive Areas Provides control over agricultural activity with the aim of reducing the amount of nitrate from agricultural land in to groundwater sources – targeting areas where nitrate levels breach or are likely to breach the 50 mg per litre set by the EC Drinking Water Directive (80/778/EEC.) Nitrate vulnerable zones from 01/01/09 have risen from 55% and now cover 68% of total U.K land

S.97 – Codes of Good Agricultural Practice Encourages and promotes good framing practices via practical guidance, whilst maintain control and reducing pollution.

== Part IV – flood defence ==
The Environment Agency exercises a general supervision over all matters relating to flood defence. Under s.105 this includes conducting environmental surveys from time to time. Section 106 covers the obligation to carry out flood defence functions through committees. Within each region each committee is empowered to maintain, improve or construct drainage works for the purpose of defence against sea water or tidal water anywhere in their area. They must also provide flood warning systems. Section 107 covers the main river functions under the Land Drainage Act 1991 and this is the power for securing the maintenance of flow of watercourses.

Parts I and V-IX Most other Parts of the act, (including Part I on the role of the National Rivers Authority and Parts VI and VIII on the Authority's finances and informational duties) were repealed by the introduction of the Environment Agency.
