= Marine and Coastal Access Act 2009 =

Act of the Parliament of the United Kingdom

Marine and Coastal Access Act 2009 (Note: Section 325.)
- Act of Parliament
- Parliament of the United Kingdom
- Long title: An Act to make provision in relation to marine functions and activities; to make provision about migratory and freshwater fish; to make provision for and in connection with the establishment of an English coastal walking route and of rights of access to land near the English coast; to enable the making of Assembly Measures in relation to Welsh coastal routes for recreational journeys and rights of access to land near the Welsh coast; to make further provision in relation to Natural England and the Countryside Council for Wales; to make provision in relation to works which are detrimental to navigation; to amend the Harbours Act 1964; and for connected purposes.
- Citation: 2009 c. 23
- Introduced by: Hilary Benn (Commons); Lord Hunt of Kings Heath (Lords)
- Territorial extent: England and Wales; Scotland; Northern Ireland; (Note: Section 323.)

Dates
- Royal assent: 12 November 2009
- Commencement: Various (Note: Section 324.)
Other legislation
Amends	Continental Shelf Act 1964; Harbours Act 1964; Sea Fisheries (Shellfish) Act 1967; Theft Act 1968; Conservation of Seals Act 1970; Prevention of Oil Pollution Act 1971; Salmon and Freshwater Fisheries Act 1975; House of Commons Disqualification Act 1975; Customs and Excise Management Act 1979; Fisheries Act 1981; Inheritance Tax Act 1984; Water Consolidation (Consequential Provisions) Act 1991; Petroleum Act 1998; Scotland Act 1998; Water Resources Act 1991; Countryside and Rights of Way Act 2000; Natural Environment and Rural Communities Act 2006; Government of Wales Act 2006
Repeals/revokes	Seal Fisheries (North Pacific) Act 1895
Amended by	Investigatory Powers Act 2016; Scotland Act 2016; Wales Act 2017; Fisheries Act 2020; Planning and Infrastructure Act 2025; Licensing Hours Extensions Act 2026; Biodiversity Beyond National Jurisdiction Act 2026
Relates to	Marine (Scotland) Act 2010

Status: Amended

History of passage through Parliament

Text of statute as originally enacted

Revised text of statute as amended

The Marine and Coastal Access Act 2009 (c. 23) is an act of the Parliament of the United Kingdom. It creates "a new system of marine management".

== Provisions ==
=== Marine Management Organisation ===
Section 1(1) of the act creates the Marine Management Organisation.

Sections 1 to 3 of, and schedules 1 and 2 to, the act came into force on 12 January 2010.

=== Exclusive economic zone ===
Section 41 of the act gave the powers to establish an exclusive economic zone (EEZ), with the zone defined by Exclusive Economic Zone Order 2013 (SI 2013/3161) which came into force on 31 March 2014. The UK was later than most states in establishing an EEZ, previously relying on overlapping maritime zones for fisheries; pollution control; and energy matters.

=== Coastal access ===
Sections 296 to 310 of the act provide for the establishment of an English coastal walking route and of rights of access to land near the English coast. They also contain supplementary legislation concerning the powers of the Welsh Assembly concerning the Wales Coast Path.

The King Charles III England Coast Path, created on the basis of the legislation, was officially opened in March 2026.

=== Marine conservation zones ===
The act allows for the establishment of marine conservation zones.

== See also ==
- Ministerial order
