= Statutory Water Companies Act 1991 =

Act of the Parliament of the United Kingdom

Statutory Water Companies Act 1991 (Note: Section 17(1).)
- Act of Parliament
- Parliament of the United Kingdom
- Long title: An Act to consolidate certain enactments relating to statutory water companies.
- Citation: 1991 c. 58
- Territorial extent: England and Wales (Note: Section 17(3).)

Dates
- Royal assent: 25 July 1991
- Commencement: 1 December 1991 (Note: Section 17(2).)
- Repealed: 26 May 2015

Other legislation
- Amended by: Companies Act 2006 (Commencement No. 3, Consequential Amendments, Transitional Provisions and Savings) Order 2007; Companies Act 2006 (Consequential Amendments etc) Order 2008; Companies Act 2006 (Consequential Amendments, Transitional Provisions and Savings) Order 2009
- Repealed by: Deregulation Act 2015
- Relates to: Water Industry Act 1991; Water Resources Act 1991; Land Drainage Act 1991; Water Consolidation (Consequential Provisions) Act 1991

Status: Repealed

Text of statute as originally enacted

Revised text of statute as amended

The Statutory Water Companies Act 1991 (1991 c. 58) was an act of the Parliament of the United Kingdom that consolidated enactments relating to statutory water companies in England and Wales.

The enactments consolidated by the act were repealed by section 3 of, and schedule 3 to, the Water Consolidation (Consequential Provisions) Act 1991.

== Subsequent developments ==
The whole act was repealed by section 115(3)(r) of, and paragraph 27 of schedule 23 to, the Deregulation Act 2015, which came into force on 26 May 2015. By that time no statutory water companies remained in existence, those that had not merged with other water undertakers having been taken over by other limited companies, rendering the act's provisions redundant.
