= Flood and Water Management Act 2010 =

Act of the Parliament of the United Kingdom

Flood and Water Management Act 2010 (Note: Section 49(7).)
- Act of Parliament
- Parliament of the United Kingdom
- Long title: An Act to make provision about water, including provision about the management of risks in connection with flooding and coastal erosion.
- Citation: 2010 c. 29
- Introduced by: Hilary Benn MP, Secretary of State for Environment, Food and Rural Affairs (Commons); Lord Davies of Oldham (Lords)
- Territorial extent: England and Wales; Scotland (in part); (Note: Section 49(5).)

Dates
- Royal assent: 8 April 2010
- Commencement: Various (Note: Section 49(4).)
Other legislation
Amends	Water Industry Act 1991; Water Resources Act 1991; Land Drainage Act 1991
Amended by	Wales Act 2017

Status: Amended

History of passage through Parliament

Text of statute as originally enacted

Revised text of statute as amended

The Flood and Water Management Act 2010 (c.29) is an act of the Parliament of the United Kingdom relating to the management of the risk concerning flooding and coastal erosion. The Act aims to reduce the flood risk associated with extreme weather, compounded by climate change. It created the role of Lead Local Flood Authority, which is the local government authority responsible for managing flood risk in the local government area. The Act gave new powers to local authorities, the Environment Agency, The Welsh Ministers and water companies.

The Act relates almost entirely to England and Wales, with the exception of Section 46, 'Abolition of Fisheries Committee (Scotland)', which relates to Scotland, and Sections 48 'Subordinate legislation' and 49 'Technical provision' which relate to England, Wales and Scotland. Parts of the act apply differently in England and Wales. Schedule 3 of the act has been implemented in Wales, but not in England.

The Flood and Water Management Act was preceded by the Pitt Review of 2007. Led by Sir Michael Pitt, the Pitt Review was a high-profile independent review of the lessons to be learned from the floods of 2007. The report put forward a number of recommendations, including the need for a "wider brief for the Environment Agency" and for local councils to be given powers and responsibilities to "protect communities through robust building and planning controls". The implementation of the Flood and Water Management Act was one of a number of actions taken by parliament as a result of the Pitt Review.

== Roles and responsibilities set out in the act ==
=== Lead local flood authority (LLFA) ===
The role of lead local flood authority (LLFA) in England is given to the unitary authority, or, if there is no unitary authority, the county council for the area. In Wales, the role is fulfilled by the county council or the county borough council. The LLFA is given certain responsibilities by the act.

The LLFA is required, by sections 9 and 10 of the act, to create and maintain a local flood risk management strategy to set objectives to manage flooding locally, specify measures proposed to achieve the objectives, outline how and when the measures will be implemented, and list the costs and benefits of the measures and how the measures will be paid for. The LLFA must apply the local flood risk management strategy and monitor its effectiveness and progress.

The LLFA must establish and maintain a register of flood risk assets, including information on their ownership and state of repair, which should be made available to the public. In March 2019, 109 out of 152 LLFAs had compiled up-to-date asset registers. The LLFA is a statutory consultee on applications for planning permission in England and Wales. This means they must be consulted by the local planning authority and have the opportunity to object to the planning application, recommend refusal, or recommend a condition to be attached to the planning permission, if the LLFA deems that flood risk and drainage has not been appropriately addressed in the planning application. However, in effect, this role is given by the SAB in Wales.

Section 19 requires the LLFA to investigate flooding events in their area and publish a report.

=== Environment Agency ===
The Environment Agency is required by section 7 of the act to develop a national flood and coastal erosion risk management strategy (FCERM) for England. The strategy describes the roles of all flood risk management authorities, including LLFAs, councils, internal drainage boards, highway authorities and water and sewerage companies, who must all exercise their responsibilities consistently with the strategy. The EA is required by Section 18 of the act to produce an annual report on flood and coastal erosion risk management. The report describes how flood risk management authorities are managing the current risk of flood and coastal erosion and how they are planning for the future risk. The report details how LLFAs have progressed on their local strategies and asset registers.

As of 2020, the strategy of FCERM was altered to have three long term ambitions:

1. Climate resilient places
2. Today's growth and infrastructure resilient in tomorrow’s climate
3. A nation ready to respond and adapt to flooding and coastal change

=== Welsh Ministers ===
The Welsh Ministers have an equivalent role to the Environment Agency with regard to developing a strategy for flood and coastal erosion risk management in Wales.

Schedule 3 of the act was implemented in Wales on 7 January 2019. It gives the Welsh Ministers the responsibility to publish national standards for the implementation of sustainable drainage, or SUDS. Sustainable drainage systems aim to manage the runoff of surface water from development projects, treating it as near to its source as possible. The decision to implement schedule 3 of the act in Wales was driven by the Well-being of Future Generations (Wales) Act 2015.

=== SUDS approving body (SAB) ===
The role of SUDS approving bodies (SAB) is created by schedule 3 of the act, which has so far only been implemented in Wales. The role falls to the county council or county borough council, as for the role of LLFA. Under schedule 3 of the act, construction work which has drainage implications may not be commenced unless a drainage system for the work has been approved by the SAB. In Wales, this applies to all construction projects with a total area exceeding 100 sq m, or of more than one dwelling, unless they can be proven not to have drainage implications.

=== Water companies ===
Sections 35 and 36 of the act provided amendments to the Water Industry Act 1991. The amendments allow the water companies to put a temporary ban on using potable water for a number of uses including using hosepipes for watering gardens and cleaning outdoor spaces.

== Implementation ==
The House of Commons Environment Food and Rural Affairs Committee raised concerns in 2012 about the slow pace of implementation of the act: "Five years on from the devastating floods of 2007 we are not convinced that Defra's work to improve the management of surface water has been carried out with sufficient urgency". In its response (September 2012), the government argued that "the majority of provisions in the Flood and Water Management Act 2010 ... affecting the management of surface water had been commenced".
