= Deregulation Act 2015 =

Act of the Parliament of the United Kingdom

Deregulation Act 2015 (Note: Section 116.)
- Act of Parliament
- Parliament of the United Kingdom
- Long title: An Act to make provision for the reduction of burdens resulting from legislation for businesses or other organisations or for individuals; make provision for the repeal of legislation which no longer has practical use; make provision about the exercise of regulatory functions; and for connected purposes.
- Citation: 2015 c. 20
- Introduced by: Oliver Letwin (Commons); Lord Wallace of Saltaire (Lords)
- Territorial extent: England and Wales; Scotland; Northern Ireland; (Note: Section 114.)

Dates
- Royal assent: 26 March 2015
- Commencement: Various (Note: Section 115.)
Other legislation
Amends	Town Police Clauses Act 1847; Mining Industry Act 1926; Administration of Justice (Miscellaneous Provisions) Act 1933; Atomic Energy Act 1946; Administration of Justice Act 1965; Transport Act 1968; Employers' Liability (Compulsory Insurance) Act 1969; Land Charges Act 1972; Industry Act 1972; Energy Act 1976; Nuclear Industry (Finance) Act 1977; Rent Act 1977; Magistrates' Courts Act 1980; Company Directors Disqualification Act 1986; British Steel Act 1988; Food Safety Act 1990; Courts and Legal Services Act 1990; Water Industry Act 1991; Water Resources Act 1991; Land Drainage Act 1991; Further and Higher Education Act 1992; Value Added Tax Act 1994; Gas Act 1995; Employment Rights Act 1996; Defamation Act 1996; Housing Act 1996; Education Act 1996; Petroleum Act 1998; Statute Law (Repeals) Act 1998; Terrorism Act 2000; Countryside and Rights of Way Act 2000; Political Parties, Elections and Referendums Act 2000; Land Registration Act 2002; Child Trust Funds Act 2004; Constitutional Reform Act 2005; Mental Capacity Act 2005; Railways Act 2005; Wireless Telegraphy Act 2006; National Health Service Act 2006; Tribunals, Courts and Enforcement Act 2007; Legal Services Act 2007; Children and Young Persons Act 2008; Third Parties (Rights against Insurers) Act 2010; Digital Economy Act 2010; Scotland Act 2012; Marriage (Same Sex Couples) Act 2013; Infrastructure Act 2015
Repeals/revokes	Fisheries Act 1891; Deeds of Arrangement Act 1914; Mining Industry Act 1920; Agricultural Produce (Grading and Marking) Act 1928; Agricultural Produce (Grading and Marking) Amendment Act 1931; Farm and Garden Chemicals Act 1967; Aircraft and Shipbuilding Industries Act 1977; British Fishing Boats Act 1983; Milk (Cessation of Production) Act 1985; Merchant Shipping Act 1988; Statutory Water Companies Act 1991
Amended by	Deregulation Act 2015 (Commencement No.3 and Transitional and Saving Provisions) Order 2015; Housing and Planning Act 2016; Wales Act 2017; Digital Economy Act 2017; Animal Welfare (Licensing of Activities Involving Animals) (England) Regulations 2018; Renters' Rights Act 2025; Legislation (Procedure, Publication and Repeals) (Wales) Act 2025

Status: Amended

History of passage through Parliament

Text of statute as originally enacted

Revised text of statute as amended

The Deregulation Act 2015 (c. 20) is an act of the Parliament of the United Kingdom concerned with regulatory reform.

== Provisions ==
One notable provision is aimed at countering retaliatory evictions (e.g. following a complaint by a tenant to a landlord about the condition of the rented property) and imposes new obligations on landlords if they are to serve a valid section 21 notice.

Section 28 reduced the qualification period for the Right to Buy in England from five years to three years. (Note: Section 28)

The duty for local authorities to consult the public before making changes that will significantly affect them is abolished.

The legislation removes the self-employed from certain health and safety regulations.

BBC license fee non-payment is decriminalised.

The Poisons Board is abolished.

Inspectors within the Environment Agency are required to consider economic growth.

The act abolished the obligation for sellers of dangerous substances, including acids, to be registered with their district council.

Turban-wearing Sikhs are exempted from wearing head protection equipment in all industries rather than specifically construction sites.

The requirement on a publican to renew a licence is abolished. The requirement on a publican to report a lost or stolen licence is abolished.

The act allowed private hire drivers to work outside the area of the authority they are licensed by.

== See also ==
- Landlord–tenant law
- Deregulation
