= Water Industry Act 1991 =

Act of the Parliament of the United Kingdom

Water Industry Act 1991 (Note: Section 223(1).)
- Act of Parliament
- Parliament of the United Kingdom
- Long title: An Act to consolidate enactments relating to the supply of water and the provision of sewerage services, with amendments to give effect to recommendations of the Law Commission.
- Citation: 1991 c. 56
- Territorial extent: England and Wales (Note: Section 223(3).)

Dates
- Royal assent: 25 July 1991
- Commencement: 1 December 1991 (Note: Section 223(2).)

Other legislation
- Amended by: List: Local Government (Wales) Act 1994; Coal Industry Act 1994; Deregulation and Contracting Out Act 1994; Health Authorities Act 1995; Merchant Shipping Act 1995; Environment Act 1995; Gas Act 1995; Government of Wales Act 1998; Competition Act 1998; Statute Law (Repeals) Act 1998; Water Industry Act 1999; Pollution Prevention and Control Act 1999; Development Commission (Transfer of Functions and Miscellaneous Provisions) Order 1999; Competition Act 1998 (Competition Commission) Transitional, Consequential and Supplemental Provisions Order 1999; Water Supply (Water Fittings) Regulations 1999; Water Industry (Charges) (Vulnerable Groups) Regulations 1999; Countryside and Rights of Way Act 2000; Enterprise Act 2002; Nationality, Immigration and Asylum Act 2002; Ministry of Agriculture, Fisheries and Food (Dissolution) Order 2002; Railways and Transport Safety Act 2003; Communications Act 2003; Water Act 2003; Health and Social Care (Community Health and Standards) Act 2003; Criminal Justice Act 2003; Nationality, Immigration and Asylum Act 2002 (Consequential and Incidental Provisions) Order 2003; Enterprise Act 2002 (Protection of Legitimate Interests) Order 2003; Transport for London (Consequential Provisions) Order 2003; Energy Act 2004; Fire and Rescue Services Act 2004; Housing Act 2004; Competition Act 1998 and Other Enactments (Amendment) Regulations 2004; Constitutional Reform Act 2005; Railways Act 2005; Water and Sewerage Undertakers (Inset Appointments) Regulations 2005; Natural Environment and Rural Communities Act 2006; Childcare Act 2006; National Health Service (Consequential Provisions) Act 2006; Restricted Byways (Application and Consequential Amendment of Provisions) Regulations 2006; Tribunals, Courts and Enforcement Act 2007; Consumers, Estate Agents and Redress Act 2007; Planning and Compulsory Purchase Act 2004 (Corresponding Amendments) Order 2007; Environmental Permitting (England and Wales) Regulations 2007; Housing and Regeneration Act 2008; Planning Act 2008; Legislative Reform (Health and Safety Executive) Order 2008; Consumer Protection from Unfair Trading Regulations 2008; Transfer of Tribunal Functions (Lands Tribunal and Miscellaneous Amendments) Order 2009; Companies Act 2006 (Consequential Amendments, Transitional Provisions and Savings) Order 2009; Children and Families (Wales) Measure 2010; Flood and Water Management Act 2010; Environmental Permitting (England and Wales) Regulations 2010; Health and Social Care Act 2008 (Consequential Amendments) Order 2010; Water Supply (Miscellaneous Amendments) (England and Wales) Regulations 2010; Health and Social Care Act 2008 (Consequential Amendments No.3) Order 2010; Postal Services Act 2011; Localism Act 2011; Education Act 2011; Treaty of Lisbon (Changes in Terminology) Order 2011; Water Supply (Amendment to the Threshold Requirement) Regulations 2011; Health and Social Care Act 2012; Water Industry (Financial Assistance) Act 2012; Civil Aviation Act 2012; Financial Services Act 2012; Treaty of Lisbon (Changes in Terminology or Numbering) Order 2012; Crime and Courts Act 2013; Enterprise and Regulatory Reform Act 2013; Growth and Infrastructure Act 2013; Energy Act 2013; Natural Resources Body for Wales (Functions) Order 2013; Water Act 2014; Public Bodies (Abolition of the National Consumer Council and Transfer of the Office of Fair Trading's Functions in relation to Estate Agents etc) Order 2014; Enterprise and Regulatory Reform Act 2013 (Competition) (Consequential, Transitional and Saving Provisions) Order 2014; Criminal Justice and Courts Act 2015; Deregulation Act 2015; Small Business, Enterprise and Employment Act 2015; Legal Aid, Sentencing and Punishment of Offenders Act 2012 (Fines on Summary Conviction) Regulations 2015; Care Act 2014 and Children and Families Act 2014 (Consequential Amendments) Order 2015; Office of Rail Regulation (Change of Name) Regulations 2015; Environment (Wales) Act 2016; Housing and Planning Act 2016; Social Services and Well-being (Wales) Act 2014 (Consequential Amendments) Regulations 2016; Water and Sewerage Undertakers (Exit from Non-household Retail Market) Regulations 2016; Environmental Permitting (England and Wales) Regulations 2016; Wales Act 2017; Digital Economy Act 2017; Bank of England and Financial Services (Consequential Amendments) Regulations 2017; Water Act 2014 (Consequential Amendments etc.) Order 2017; Regulation and Inspection of Social Care (Wales) Act 2016 (Consequential Amendments) Regulations 2018; Competition (Amendment etc.) (EU Exit) Regulations 2019; Floods and Water (Amendment etc.) (EU Exit) Regulations 2019; Regulation and Inspection of Social Care (Wales) Act 2016 (Consequential Amendments) Regulations 2019; Competition (Amendment etc.) (EU Exit) (No. 2) Regulations 2019; Corporate Insolvency and Governance Act 2020; Competition (Amendment etc.) (EU Exit) Regulations 2020; Environment Act 2021; Water and Sewerage Undertakers (Exit from Non-household Retail Market) (Consequential Provision) Regulations 2021; Health and Care Act 2022; Levelling-up and Regeneration Act 2023; Retained EU Law (Revocation and Reform) Act 2023 (Consequential Amendment) Regulations 2023; Digital Markets, Competition and Consumers Act 2024; Water Industry Act 1991 (Amendment) Order 2024; Water Industry (Special Administration) Regulations 2024; Water (Special Measures) Act 2025; Digital Markets, Competition and Consumers Act 2024 (Consequential Amendments) Regulations 2025; Planning (Consequential Provisions) (Wales) Act 2026
- Relates to: Water Resources Act 1991; Statutory Water Companies Act 1991; Land Drainage Act 1991; Water Consolidation (Consequential Provisions) Act 1991

Status: Amended

Text of statute as originally enacted

Revised text of statute as amended

Text of the Water Industry Act 1991 as in force today (including any amendments) within the United Kingdom, from legislation.gov.uk.

The Water Industry Act 1991 (c. 56) is an act of the Parliament of the United Kingdom consolidating previous enactments relating to the water supply and the provision of wastewater services in England and Wales. It also implemented recommendations made by the Law Commission.

The enactments consolidated by the act were repealed by section 3 of, and schedule 3 to, the Water Consolidation (Consequential Provisions) Act 1991.

== Provisions ==
The act is divided into eight parts and a further 15 schedules are attached.

=== Sections ===
- Part 1 deals with the appointment and duties of the Director General of Water Services.
- Part 2 deals with appointment and regulation of Undertakers, the private sector water companies responsible for maintaining the water supply system in the United Kingdom.
- Part 3 deals with the duties of the water companies with respect to water supply in England and Wales,
- Part 4 deals with the duties of the water companies with respect to sewerage.
- Part 5 deals with the financial provisions for operating the system
- Part 6 gives the water companies certain powers in order to discharge their duties.
- Part 7 deals with the provision of information to interested parties
- Part 8 deals with miscellaneous details such as limiting the right to prosecute water companies in respect of sewerage offences.

=== Schedules ===
The act includes 15 schedules, which include:

- Schedule 4, dealing with "customer service committees"; this schedule was repealed by the Water Act 2003.
- Schedule 5, dealing with water pressure and constancy of supply;
- Schedule 6 on Rights of Entry; and
- Schedule 14 on mineral rights.

== Part 2: Water undertakers ==
As of 1 April 2005 the full list of undertakers was:

- Scottish Water
- Anglian Water Services Ltd
- Northumbrian Water Ltd
- Severn Trent Water Ltd
- Southern Water Services Ltd
- South West Water Ltd
- Thames Water Utilities Ltd
- United Utilities Water PLC [formerly North West Water Ltd]
- Welsh Water - Dwr Cymru Cyfyngedig
- Wessex Water Services Ltd
- Yorkshire Water Services Ltd

Water only undertakers were:

- Bournemouth and West Hampshire Water Plc 1 April 2005
- Bristol Water plc 1 April 2005
- Cambridge Water plc 1 April 2005
- Cholderton and District Water Company Ltd 1 April 2005
- Dee Valley Water plc 1 April 2005
- Folkestone and Dover Water Services Ltd 1 April 2005
- Mid Kent Water Ltd 26 August 2005
- Portsmouth Water Ltd 1 April 2005
- South East Water Ltd 1 April 2005
- South Staffordshire Water plc 30 September 2005
- Sutton and East Surrey Water plc 1 April 2005
- Tendring Hundred Water Services Ltd 1 April 2005
- Three Valleys Water Services plc

== Part 3 Water supply ==
Part 3 imposes a duty to maintain an efficient and economical water supply system and prescribes minimum standards of performance in connection with water supply.

=== Standards of wholesomeness ===
Clause 67 of the act allows the Secretary of State to proscribe Standards of wholesomeness for water; prescribing the purposes for which the water is to be suitable; substances that are to be present or absent and the concentrations.

== Part 4 Sewerage services ==
Part 4 deals with sewers.

=== Sewer adoption ===
Under section 104 a developer can build sewers and agree that the water company will adopt them later.
