= Natural Environment and Rural Communities Act 2006 =

Act of the Parliament of the United Kingdom

Natural Environment and Rural Communities Act 2006 (Note: Section 109.)
- Act of Parliament
- Parliament of the United Kingdom
- Long title: An Act to make provision about bodies concerned with the natural environment and rural communities; to make provision in connection with wildlife, sites of special scientific interest, National Parks and the Broads; to amend the law relating to rights of way; to make provision as to the Inland Waterways Amenity Advisory Council; to provide for flexible administrative arrangements in connection with functions relating to the environment and rural affairs and certain other functions; and for connected purposes.
- Citation: 2006 c. 16
- Territorial extent: England and Wales; Scotland (in part); Northern Ireland (in part); (Note: Section 108.)

Dates
- Royal assent: 30 March 2006
- Commencement: Various (Note: Section 107.)
Other legislation
Amends	Agricultural Marketing Act 1958; Superannuation Act 1965; Conservation of Seals Act 1970; House of Commons Disqualification Act 1975; Import of Live Fish (England and Wales) Act 1980; Inheritance Tax Act 1984; National Heritage (Scotland) Act 1985; Channel Tunnel Act 1987; Deer Act 1991; Water Industry Act 1991; Water Resources Act 1991; Land Drainage Act 1991; Protection of Badgers Act 1992; Government of Wales Act 1998; Countryside and Rights of Way Act 2000; Scottish Public Services Ombudsman Act 2002
Amended by	Marine and Coastal Access Act 2009; Charities Act 2011; Planning and Infrastructure Act 2025; Employment Rights Act 2025

Status: Amended

History of passage through Parliament

Text of statute as originally enacted

Text of the Natural Environment and Rural Communities Act 2006 as in force today (including any amendments) within the United Kingdom, from legislation.gov.uk.

The Natural Environment and Rural Communities Act 2006 (c. 16), also referred to as the NERC Act, is an act of the Parliament of the United Kingdom. In a reorganisation of public bodies involved in rural policy and delivery, the measures dissolved English Nature, the Countryside Agency and the Rural Development Service, and established Natural England.

== Part 1 ==
=== Chapter 1 ===
Chapter 1 (sections 1–16) deals with the establishment and role of Natural England. English Nature, the Countryside Agency, and the Rural Development Service are dissolved, and most of their powers transferred to the new agency.

=== Chapter 2 ===
Chapter 2 (sections 17–25) establishes as a public body the Commission for Rural Communities, which had been created in 2005 as a division of the Countryside Agency. Subsequently, a statement in June 2010 by Caroline Spelman led to the abolition of the commission.

== Part 2 ==
=== Section 31 – Joint Nature Conservation Committee ===
Section 31 and Schedule 4 reconstitute the Joint Nature Conservation Committee.

== Part 3 ==
=== Sections 40 to 42 – Duty to conserve biodiversity ===
Section 40 of the NERC Act places a duty to conserve biodiversity on public authorities in England. It requires local authorities and government departments to have regard to the purposes of conserving biodiversity in a manner that is consistent with the exercise of their normal functions such as policy and decision-making. 'Conserving biodiversity' may include enhancing, restoring or protecting a population or a habitat.

Section 41 requires the Secretary of State to publish and maintain lists of species and types of habitats which are regarded by Natural England to be of "principal importance" for the purposes of conserving biodiversity in England. These 56 priority habitats and 943 species are drawn from earlier lists of United Kingdom Biodiversity Action Plan Priority Species and Habitats. The section 41 lists are needed by decision-makers in local and regional authorities when carrying out their duties under section 40 of the act.

Section 42 similarly required the National Assembly for Wales to publish equivalent lists of priority species and habitats for that country. However, this requirement (and one specified in section 40 for Wales) has been superseded by virtue of similar requirements being enshrined in the Environment (Wales) Act 2016.

== Part 8 ==
=== Sections 87 to 97 – reform of various agricultural bodies ===
Chapter 2 of part 8 laid the ground for rationalisation of levy-funded boards in agriculture and related industries, leading to the establishment in 2008 of the Agriculture and Horticulture Development Board and Quality Meat Scotland, replacing the Meat and Livestock Commission, the British Potato Council, the Home Grown Cereals Authority, the Horticultural Development Council and the Milk Development Council.

== Part 10 ==
=== Section 107 – Commencement ===
The following orders have been made under this section:

- The Natural Environment and Rural Communities Act 2006 (Commencement No. 1) Order 2006 (SI 2006/1176 (C.40))
- The Natural Environment and Rural Communities Act 2006 (Commencement No. 2) Order 2006 (SI 2006/1382 (C.47))
- The Natural Environment and Rural Communities Act 2006 (Commencement No. 3 and Transitional Provisions) Order 2006 (SI 2006/2541 (C.86))
- The Natural Environment and Rural Communities Act 2006 (Commencement No. 4) Order 2007 (SI 2007/816 (C.32))
- The Natural Environment and Rural Communities Act 2006 (Commencement No. 1) (England) Order 2007 (SI 2007/2540 (C.97))
- The Natural Environment and Rural Communities Act 2006 (Commencement) (Wales) Order 2006 (SI 2006/2992 (W.279) (C.106))

== See also ==
- List of United Kingdom Biodiversity Action Plan species
- Environment (Wales) Act 2016
- Wildlife and Natural Environment (Scotland) Act 2011

== Bibliography ==
- Alex Ruck Keene. "Natural Environment and Rural Communities Act 2006". Current Law Statutes Annotated 2006. Sweet & Maxwell. London. W Green. Edinburgh. 2006. Volume 1. Chapter 16. pp 16-1 to 16-101.
- Halsbury's Statutes
