= Railways Act 2005 =

Act of the Parliament of the United Kingdom

Railways Act 2005 (Note: Section 60(1).)
- Act of Parliament
- Parliament of the United Kingdom
- Long title: An Act to amend the law relating to the provision and regulation of railway services; and for connected purposes.
- Citation: 2005 c. 14
- Territorial extent: England and Wales; Scotland (except sections 13 and 39 and 52); (Note: Section 60(5)–(6).)

Dates
- Royal assent: 7 April 2005
- Commencement: Various (Note: Section 60(2)–(4).)
Other legislation
Amends	Transport Act 1962; Airports Act 1986; Water Industry Act 1991; Water Resources Act 1991; Scottish Public Services Ombudsman Act 2002
Amended by	Postal Services Act 2011

Status: Amended

Text of statute as originally enacted

Revised text of statute as amended

The Railways Act 2005 (c. 14) is an act of the Parliament of the United Kingdom concerning the regulatory structure for railways in the United Kingdom. The main changes included the abolition of the Strategic Rail Authority and the reduction of the number of passenger franchises on the National Rail network.

== Overview ==
The bill was introduced and published on 25 November 2004 and received royal assent on 7 April 2005. The act made certain reforms, principally:

- Abolished the Strategic Rail Authority (SRA), transferring its functions to the Secretary of State, the Office of Rail Regulation, the Scottish Government, and the Mayor of London;
- Transferred certain responsibilities from the Health and Safety Executive to the Office of Rail Regulation;
- Reduced the number of passenger franchises;
- Increased the breadth of Network Rail's responsibilities;
- Established the Rail Passengers Council (later known as Passenger Focus).

== Reception ==
The act was described alongside the Transport (Wales) Act 2006 as the largest transfer of powers to the Assembly between 1999 and 2007 in Contemporary Wales.

== Orders made under section 60 ==
The following orders have been made under this section:

- The Railways Act 2005 (Commencement No. 1) Order 2005 (S.I. 2005/1444 (C. 64))
- The Railways Act 2005 (Commencement No. 2) Order 2005 (S.I. 2005/1909 (C. 82))
- The Railways Act 2005 (Commencement No. 3) Order 2005 (S.I. 2005/2252 (C. 94))
- The Railways Act 2005 (Commencement No. 4) Order 2005 (S.I. 2005/2812 (C. 117))
- The Railways Act 2005 (Commencement No. 5) Order 2006 (S.I. 2006/266 (C. 7))
- The Railways Act 2005 (Commencement No. 6) Order 2006 (S.I. 2006/1951 (C. 65))
- The Railways Act 2005 (Commencement No. 7, Transitional and Saving Provisions) Order 2006 (S.I. 2006/2911 (C. 102))
- The Railways Act 2005 (Commencement No. 8) Order 2007 (S.I. 2007/62 (C. 2))
- The Railways Act 2005 (Commencement No. 9) Order 2007 (S.I. 2007/1993 (C. 74))
