= Vodafone Ltd v British Telecommunications Plc =

Vodafone Ltd v BT Plc
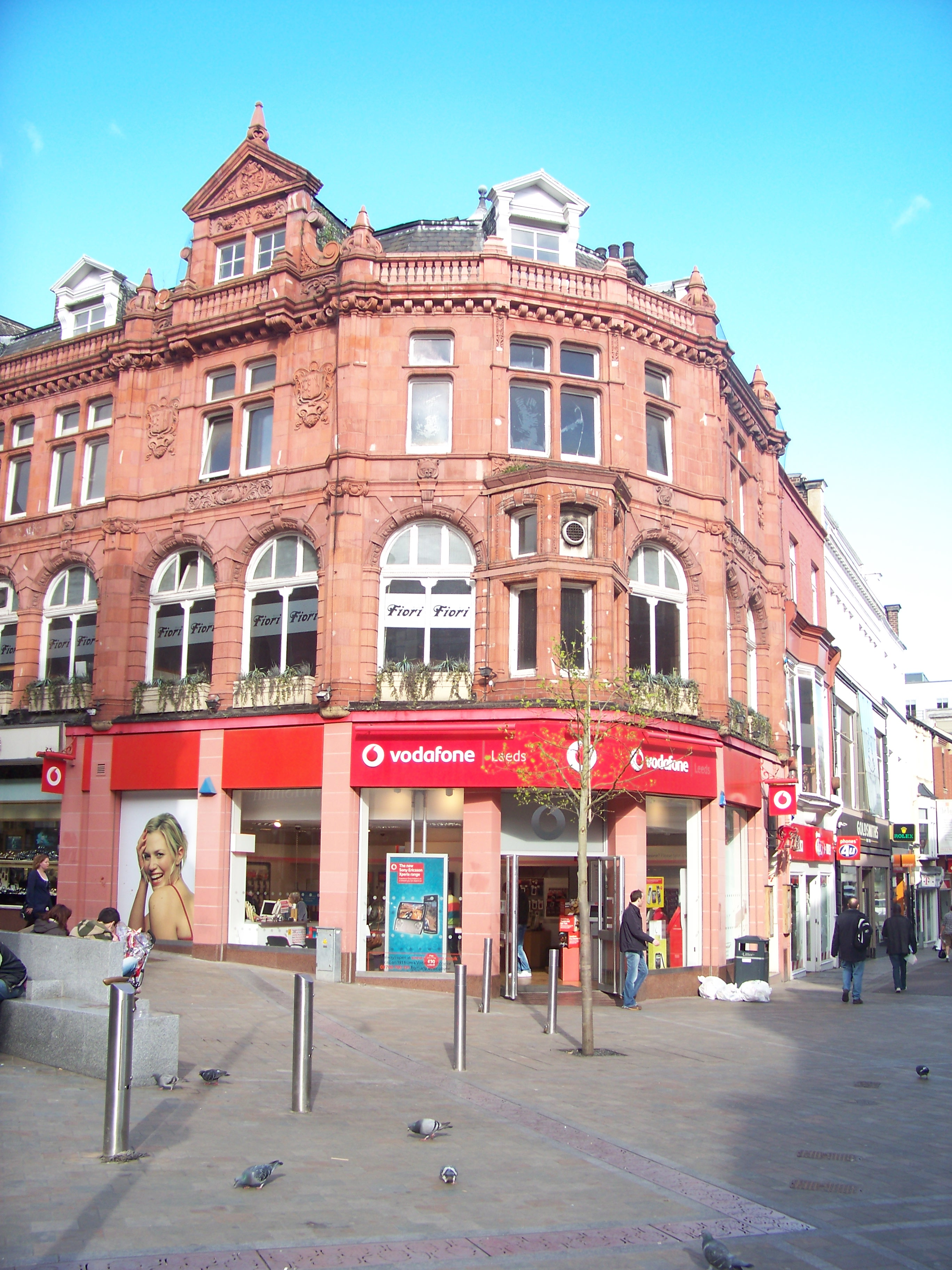
- Court: Court of Appeal
- Citation: [2010] EWCA Civ 391

Keywords
- Telecommunications

Vodafone Ltd v British Telecommunications Plc is an EU law case relevant for UK enterprise law, concerning telecommunications.

== Facts ==
Vodafone argued that Ofcom should not subject it to price controls. Ofcom had found that Vodafone had significant market power in their networks for mobile call termination (a caller on one network is connected to a mobile recipient on another network). It capped Vodafone's charges for wholesale service of mobile call termination for four years, reducing average charges gradually. BT appealed to the CAT, arguing the price controls were set too high. The CAT referred to the Competition Commission. The Tribunal found before that under the Communications Act 2003 section 195 it could direct Ofcom to reset price controls for a four-year period. It was argued that the CAT had no such power when a period had already elapsed.

== Judgment ==
Lloyd LJ, Moore-Bick LJ and Richards LJ held the Competition Appeal Tribunal had no power to direct Ofcom to impose revised price controls on a retrospective basis. Under CA 2003 section 195(5) it was clear there was no power to direct Ofcom to do something it would otherwise have no power to do. Under section 45(10)(e) Ofcom had the power to revoke or modify conditions that were in force, but that did not include a power to modify a condition with retrospective effect.

== See also ==
- United Kingdom enterprise law
- EU law
