= Disappearance of Dorothy Arnold =

American socialite and heiress (1885–vanished 1910)

Dorothy Arnold
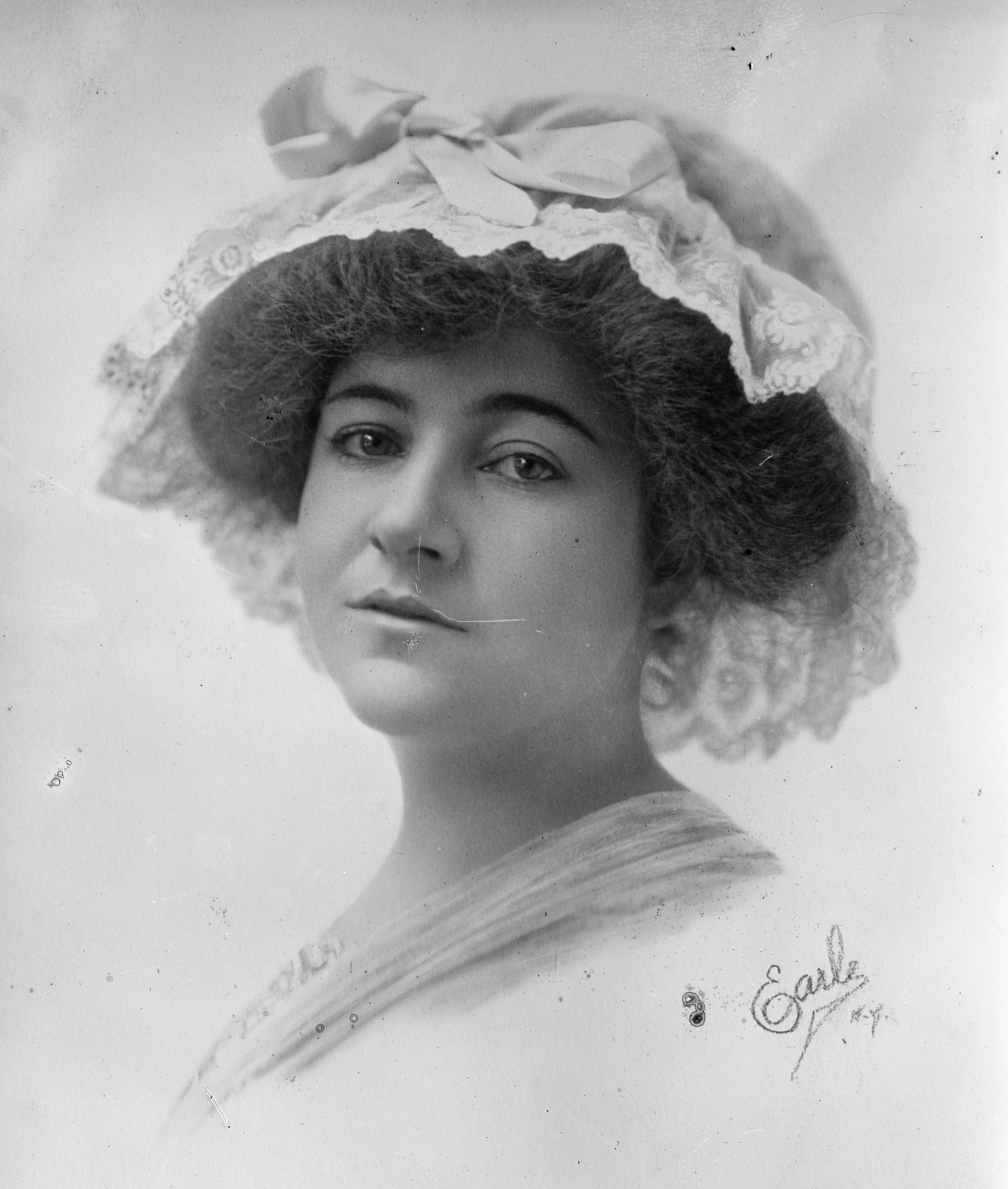
- Arnold c. 1910
- Born: Dorothy Harriet Camille Arnold; July 1, 1885; New York City, New York, U.S.
- Disappeared: December 12, 1910 (aged 25); New York City, U.S.
- Status: Declared dead in absentia
- Education: Bryn Mawr College
- Occupation: Socialite

Dorothy Harriet Camille Arnold (July 1, 1885 – disappeared December 12, 1910) was an American socialite and heiress who disappeared under mysterious circumstances in New York City in December 1910.

The daughter of Francis R. Arnold, a fine goods importer, Arnold was born and raised in Manhattan in an affluent family. After graduating from Bryn Mawr College, she returned to her family home at 108 East 79th Street and attempted to begin a career as a writer. On December 12, 1910, Arnold left her home to go shopping for a dress and was seen by a cashier as well as a friend on Fifth Avenue. She told the friend that she had planned to walk through Central Park before returning home. That evening, when Arnold failed to appear for dinner, her family grew suspicious.

Arnold's father initially wanted to avoid publicity over his daughter's disappearance, and so sought the help of private investigators in locating her. After these attempts proved fruitless, the family filed a missing persons report with the New York City Police Department (NYPD) in January 1911. Various theories, sightings and rumors regarding Arnold's disappearance circulated in the years and decades after she was last seen, but the circumstances have never been resolved and Arnold's fate remains unknown.

== Timeline ==
=== Background ===
Dorothy Harriet Camille Arnold was born in New York City on July 1, 1885, the second of four children to Francis Rose Arnold and his wife, Mary Martha Parks Arnold (née Samuels). Arnold had an older brother, John (born December 1884) and two younger siblings: Dan Hinckley (born February 1888) and Marjorie Brewster (born August 1891). Her father was a Harvard University graduate who was a senior partner of F.R. Arnold & Co., a company that imported "fancy goods" such as perfumes. Her paternal aunt, Harriette Maria Arnold, was married to Supreme Court Justice Rufus W. Peckham. Arnold's paternal family were descendants of English passengers who arrived in North America on the Mayflower, while her mother hailed from Montreal, Quebec, Canada. Due to their social standing, the family was listed in the Social Register.

Arnold was educated at New York's Veltin School for Girls and attended Bryn Mawr College in Pennsylvania, where she majored in literature and language. She graduated from Bryn Mawr in 1905. After her graduation, Arnold continued to live at the family home at 108 East 79th Street and attempted to begin a career as a writer.

In spring 1910, Arnold submitted a short story to McClure's magazine which was rejected. Her friends and family, who were largely amused by her writing aspirations, teased her about the rejection, prompting Arnold to rent a post office box to receive correspondence from magazines and publishing houses. She submitted a second short story to McClure's, "The Poinsettia Flames", in November 1910; that story was also rejected. According to Arnold's friends, the second rejection left her dejected and embarrassed. Two months before she disappeared, Arnold asked her father Francis if she could take an apartment in Greenwich Village in order to write. Francis forbade his daughter to move out of the family home, telling her that, "A good writer can write anywhere." Dorothy Arnold continued to pursue a writing career, but found no success.

=== Disappearance ===
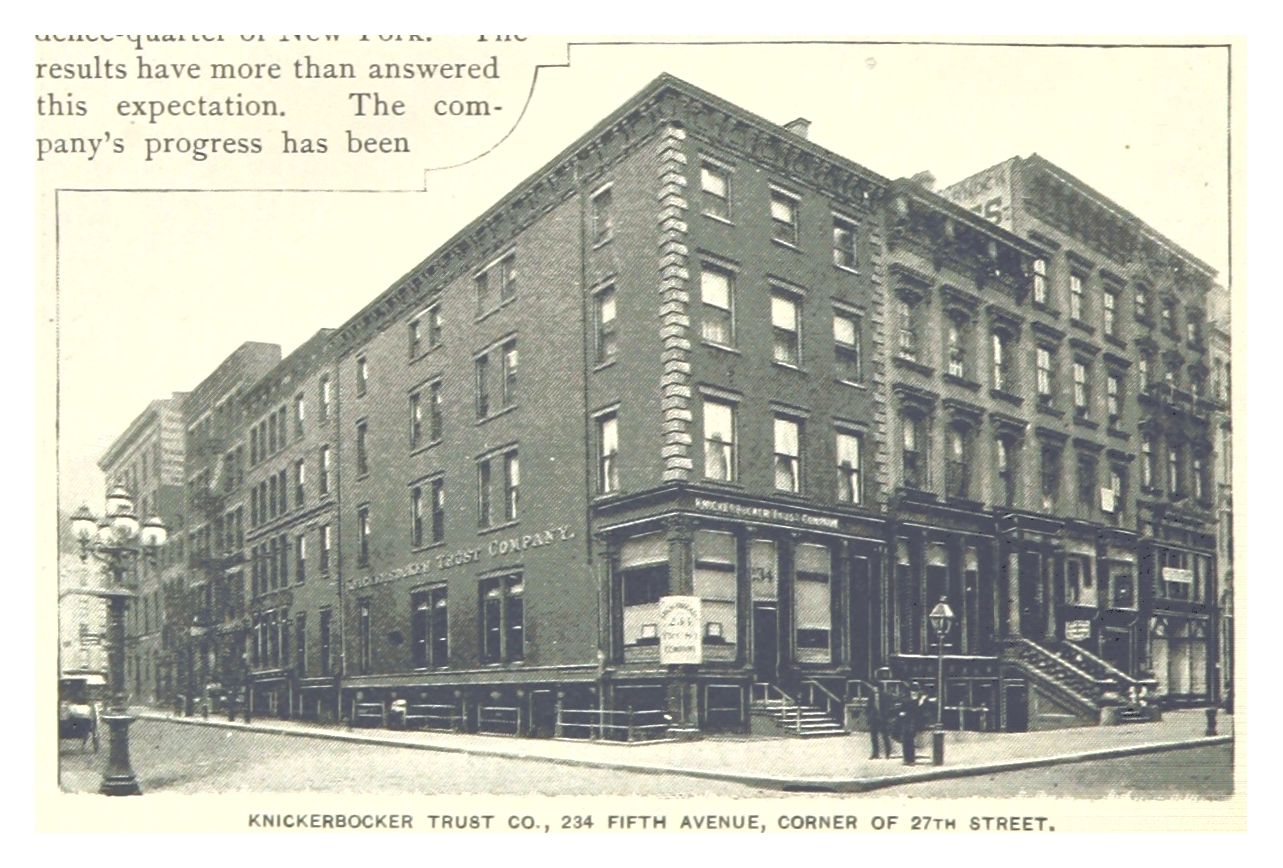
The Knickerbocker Trust Co., located at Fifth Avenue and 27th Street, the intersection where Arnold was last reported seen

On the morning of December 12, 1910, Arnold informed her mother Mary that she intended to go shopping for a dress to wear for her younger sister Marjorie's upcoming debutante party. Mary offered to go with her daughter, but Arnold declined the offer, telling her mother she would call her if she found a suitable dress. She then left the family home at around 11 a.m. According to the Arnold family, she had approximately $25–30 cash in her possession (approximately $864 to $1037 today). She walked from her home on 79th Street to the Park & Tilford store at the corner of Fifth Avenue and 59th Street.

Arnold charged a half pound box of chocolates to her account at approximately 12:00 p.m., placed it in her muff, and then walked thirty-two blocks (1.9 miles) south to Brentano's bookstore at 27th Street and Fifth Ave. While at Brentano's, Arnold purchased Engaged Girl Sketches, a book of humorous essays by Emily Calvin Blake. The clerks who waited on Arnold in both stores later said that she was courteous and did not exhibit any unusual behavior.

Outside the bookstore, Arnold ran into a female friend named Gladys King. King recalled that the two spoke briefly about Marjorie's upcoming debutante party and that Arnold seemed to be in good spirits. King then excused herself to meet her mother for lunch at the Waldorf-Astoria. She recalled that Arnold told her she was going to walk home through Central Park. King last saw Arnold on 27th Street shortly before 2 p.m. when she turned to wave goodbye for a second time.

There were no published reports of Arnold having shopped for the intended dress.

By the early evening, Arnold had failed to return home for dinner. As she never missed meals without informing her family, the Arnolds became worried. They began calling her friends to find her whereabouts, but no one had seen her. Shortly after midnight on December 13, Elsie Henry, one of Arnold's friends, phoned the family home to see if she had returned. Henry later said Arnold's mother answered the telephone and told her that she had returned home. When Henry asked to speak to Arnold, her mother hesitated and told Henry that Arnold had gone to bed with a headache.

=== Investigation ===
Fearing that their daughter's disappearance would draw unwanted press attention and could become socially embarrassing, the Arnold family didn't report her disappearance to the police for weeks. It is speculated that the family was influenced by the 1909 disappearance of Adele Boas, a 13-year-old girl who was reported missing from Central Park and later found to have run away to Boston. Adele later returned home. The Boas family, also prominent Upper East Siders, were scandalized and shamed in the newspapers after the incident.

In an attempt to keep the incident out of the papers, the Arnold family quietly contacted John S. Keith, a family friend and lawyer, the morning following Arnold's disappearance. Keith arrived at the family home and searched Arnold's bedroom. He discovered that except for the outfit she was wearing, all of her clothes and other personal belongings were accounted for. He also found personal letters with foreign postmarks and two folders for transatlantic ocean liners on Arnold's desk, as well as burned papers in her fireplace. The burned papers were presumed to be the rejected manuscripts Arnold had submitted to McClure's. Over the following weeks, Keith visited jails, hospitals and morgues in New York, Boston and Philadelphia, but did not find any sign of Arnold. After his search proved fruitless, he suggested that the Arnold family hire Pinkerton detectives to investigate.

Pinkerton investigators searched area hospitals and other places that Arnold was known to frequent but found no trace of her. They also questioned Arnold's friends and former college classmates about her whereabouts, but none had seen her. As Keith had found literature for transatlantic ocean liners in Arnold's room the day after she disappeared, Pinkerton investigators theorized that she might have eloped with a man to Europe. The agents searched marriage records, but none was found bearing Arnold's name. Agents were then dispatched overseas to search ocean liners arriving from New York. While several women matching Arnold's physical description were found, Arnold herself was not.

After Keith and the Pinkerton investigators could not find Arnold, they persuaded her father to contact the New York City Police Department (NYPD). The police advised him to hold a press conference in order to get as much publicity as possible. Arnold's father resisted the suggestion, but eventually agreed. On January 25, 1911, reporters gathered at his New York City office, where he informed them of his daughter's disappearance and offered a $1,000 reward (approximately $35,000 today) for information leading to her whereabouts.

During the press conference, reporters asked Francis Arnold if it were possible that his daughter was still alive and had simply run away with a man, as he did not allow his daughter to date. Francis vehemently denied this stating, "I would have been glad to see her associate more with young men than she did, especially some young men of brains and position: one whose profession or business would keep him occupied. I don't approve of young men who have nothing to do." Reporters soon discovered that Francis' comment was in reference to George Griscom Jr., a man Arnold had met while attending Bryn Mawr and with whom she was romantically involved. Griscom was a 40-year-old engineer who came from a wealthy Pennsylvania family, with whom he still lived at the Kenmawr Hotel in Pittsburgh.

Reporters also discovered that, in September 1910, Arnold had lied to her parents and told them she was going to visit a former Bryn Mawr classmate in Boston. Instead, she spent a week in a hotel with Griscom. Arnold's parents found out about the rendezvous after Arnold pawned $500 worth of jewels to finance their week-long stay. After returning home, Arnold's parents forbade her to continue the relationship with Griscom because they found him unsuitable. Despite their disapproval, Arnold continued to correspond with Griscom. The two saw each other for a final time in early November, shortly before Griscom left on a vacation with his parents.

After Arnold's disappearance, Griscom was found vacationing with his parents in Florence, Italy. The Arnold family sent him a telegram on December 16 asking for information about Dorothy's disappearance. In a return telegram, Griscom denied any knowledge of her whereabouts and claimed to know nothing of her disappearance. In early January 1911, Arnold's mother Mary and her brother John travelled to Italy by ship to forcibly interrogate Griscom. They met him in his room at the Anglo-American Hotel on January 16. Griscom continued to maintain that he knew nothing of the disappearance. Mary and John demanded that Griscom give them the letters that Dorothy had sent him. John later claimed the letters contained nothing of importance and said that he later destroyed them. Upon his return to the United States in February 1911, Griscom told the press that he intended to marry Arnold once she was found and on the condition that her mother approve of the marriage. Mary later told reporters she would never approve of the union.

That same month, the San Francisco Chronicle reported that clerks at the Anglo-American Hotel had seen a veiled woman they believed to be Arnold. According to staff, Griscom and the veiled woman had an "earnest talk" they could not hear and that the woman appeared "greatly agitated". In the months following the announcement of Arnold's disappearance, Griscom spent thousands of dollars for ads in major newspapers asking her to come home.

By the end of January 1911, the NYPD said they still believed that Arnold was alive and would return on her own accord. Her family, however, said they had come to believe that she was dead. Around this time, Francis Arnold told the press that he believed from the start that his daughter had been attacked and killed while walking home through Central Park and that her body had been thrown into the Central Park Reservoir. He cited two clues, which he would not publicly disclose, that he claimed confirmed his suspicions. Police dismissed his theory because in the days leading up to Arnold's disappearance, the temperature in New York City had dropped to 21 °F and the reservoir had frozen solid. Despite this, a search of Central Park was conducted anyway; no trace of Arnold was found. When the reservoir thawed that spring, police searched the water but did not find a body.

=== Alleged sightings and letters ===
In the days following the announcement of Arnold's disappearance, the NYPD distributed circulars with her picture, physical description and information about the reward throughout the U.S., Canada and Mexico. The New York Times continued to cover the story on a near daily basis. The publicity led to investigators receiving calls from people across the U.S. who claimed to have seen Arnold. These calls were investigated but proved to be false. The Arnold family also received two ransom notes from alleged kidnappers who demanded upwards of $5,000 for Arnold's return. The kidnapping claims proved to be hoaxes.

In early February 1911, Arnold's father received a postcard signed "Dorothy" bearing a New York City postmark that read, "I am safe." While the writing matched his daughter's, Francis said he believed that someone had copied her handwriting from samples that were featured in the newspaper and that the postcard was nothing more than a cruel joke. Around the same time, a jeweler in San Francisco claimed a woman he recognized as Arnold had him engrave a diamond wedding ring for her on January 7, with the inscription "To A.J.A. from E.R.B., December 10, 1910."

Shortly after this, the NYPD announced that they had decided to stop investigating Arnold's disappearance, saying they believed she was dead. Deputy police commissioner William J. Flynn stated, "That now seems the only reasonable way of looking at the case. [...] The girl has now been missing for 75 days and in all that time not a single clue has been found that was worth the name. [...] We have no evidence that a crime has been committed and the case is now one of a missing person and nothing more." Police continued to investigate reports of sightings, but none led to Arnold.

=== Rumors and theories ===
Numerous theories and rumors regarding Arnold's disappearance continued to arise. One theory was that she had slipped on an icy sidewalk, struck her head and was in a hospital with total amnesia. This theory did not pan out as there were no women matching her description in area hospitals who had sustained a concussion. Other theories arose that Arnold had been drugged and abducted, but that theory was considered unlikely as she was last seen on a busy street in mid-afternoon. Griscom, for his part, theorized that she had died by suicide because she was despondent over her writing career. After her second short story was rejected, Arnold wrote a letter to Griscom expressing her disappointment over her lack of progress as a writer and alluded to suicide, stating, "Well, it [the short story] has come back. McClure's has turned me down. Failure stares me in the face. All I can see ahead is a long road with no turning. Mother will always think an accident has happened."

Some of Arnold's family members and friends also said they believed that Arnold had died by suicide, but felt she killed herself because her relationship with Griscom was faltering. The New York World also supported this reasoning after they discovered that Griscom's cousin, Andrew, had jumped to his death from an ocean liner after he had been forbidden to marry an English governess.

One of the more widespread rumors was that Arnold had become pregnant, had sought an abortion, had died during or after the botched procedure and had been secretly buried or cremated. This rumor gained some credibility when, in April 1916, an illegal abortion clinic operating out of the basement of a home in Bellevue, Pennsylvania, was raided by police. The clinic was run by Dr. C.C. Meredith and became notoriously known as "The House of Mystery," after numerous women from the area went missing after visiting the clinic. One of the doctors who worked at the clinic, Dr. H.E. Lutz, testified to the New York County District Attorney that Dr. Meredith told him that Arnold had died there after experiencing complications from an abortion. Lutz claimed that, like many of the women who had undergone abortions at the clinic and died, her body was burned in a furnace. While the district attorney said he believed that Arnold had died at the clinic, her father said he thought the story was "...ridiculous and absolutely untrue."

Keith later told the media that two months after Arnold disappeared, he got a tip from an attorney in Pittsburgh that she was in a local sanatorium. Keith claimed that he and two detectives traveled to Pittsburgh but discovered that the woman was not Arnold.

==== Edward Glennoris ====
Over five years after Arnold's disappearance, in April 1916, a convicted felon in Rhode Island named Edward Glennoris (spelled Glenoris in some reports), who was then imprisoned for attempted extortion, claimed that he was paid $250 to bury the body of a young woman in December 1910. Glennoris claimed that an acquaintance known only as "Little Louie" hired him to drive the woman from a home in New Rochelle to West Point, New York. In New Rochelle, Glennoris said that he and Little Louie were met by two men: one of whom was named "Doc" and another whom Glennoris described as "wealthy and well dressed," which matched Griscom's physical description. Glennoris and Little Louie then loaded the unconscious woman in the car and drove her to a house in Weehawken, New Jersey.

During the drive, Glennoris said that Little Louie told him that the woman was Dorothy Arnold. Glennoris also said that he recognized Arnold and was able to identify a signet ring on the index finger of her left hand that matched a ring she owned. The next day, Little Louie contacted Glennoris to "finish the job." Upon returning to Weehawken, "Doc" informed the men that the woman had died at the home during an operation. Glennoris said that he and Little Louie then drove the woman's body back to the home in New Rochelle, wrapped the body in a sheet and buried it in the cellar.

Glennoris initially told this story to a prison warden, who then reported it to authorities. However, upon subsequent interviews with law enforcement, Glennoris acted confused and claimed he knew nothing about Arnold's whereabouts. Police followed up on Glennoris' initial claim and excavated the cellars of several homes in the area, but did not locate any human remains. Arnold's father vehemently denied Glennoris' claims, telling reporters, "So far it appears on the face of the man's story, he is talking utter nonsense."

=== Aftermath ===
Years after Arnold disappeared, numerous alleged sightings from all over the U.S. were still being reported. Police continued to investigate these reports, but all proved to be false. The Arnold family also continued to receive letters from women claiming to be Arnold. These were also investigated and also proved to be false. One such letter came from an attorney in California who claimed that Arnold was living as "Ella Nevins" in Los Angeles, a claim that her father disputed.

The case gained attention again on April 8, 1921, when "during a lecture in New York, Captain John H. Ayers of the Bureau of Missing Persons claimed that Dorothy Arnold's fate had been known to the Bureau and her family for some time. Ayers refused to elaborate and would not say if Arnold was alive or dead." The following day, Ayers claimed that he was misquoted and denied that Arnold's fate was known.

In the weeks following his daughter's disappearance, Francis Arnold spent approximately $250,000 trying to find his daughter. He continued to maintain that he believed she had been kidnapped and murdered on the day she disappeared or shortly thereafter. Francis died on April 6, 1922. In his will, he intentionally made no provisions for Arnold, stating that he was "satisfied that she is not alive."

According to Keith, Dorothy's mother Mary did not share her husband's opinion that their daughter had been murdered and remained hopeful that she was still alive. She died on December 29, 1928. Shortly after her death, Keith publicly stated he believed that Arnold had died by suicide because of her failed writing career. In an obituary for Mary Arnold, United Press Associations (now UPI) referenced the hunt for Dorothy Arnold as "the really great search of the age, and one that did much to develop modern newspaper 'police' coverage."

== In popular culture ==
It inspired the television and radio play The Thin Air by Sumner Locke Elliott.

In her young adult novel Lost (2009), author Jacqueline Davies combines the story of Arnold's disappearance with that of the Triangle Shirtwaist Factory fire.

The short horror novel The Lurker at the Threshold (1945), by August Derleth and H.P. Lovecraft, mentions the disappearance of Dorothy Arnold near the end, in a list of disappearances and Fortean phenomena.

In 2019, the case was covered by BuzzFeed Unsolved.

== See also ==
- List of people who disappeared mysteriously (1910–1970)
