= Orange UK =

1994–2010 UK mobile network operator and ISP

Orange plc
- Logo used from 1994-2015
- Type: Subsidiary
- Industry: Telecommunications
- Founded: 28 March 1994; 32 years ago
- Founder: Li Ka-shing
- Defunct: 1 April 2010; 16 years ago (as a company); February 2015; 11 years ago (as a brand of EE); March 2019; 7 years ago (discontinuation of service)
- Fate: Merged with T-Mobile UK into EE
- Successor: EE
- Headquarters: United Kingdom
- Area served: United Kingdom
- Products: Telecommunications products and services
- Parent: Hutchison Whampoa (1991-1996); Mannesmann (1999-2000); France Télécom (2000-2010); EE (2010-2019)
- Website: orange.co.uk at the Wayback Machine (archived 2015-01-20)

Orange UK was a mobile network operator and internet service provider in the United Kingdom, launched in 1994. It was once a constituent of the FTSE 100 Index but was purchased by France Télécom (now Orange S.A.) in 2000, which then adopted the Orange brand for all its other mobile communications activities. Orange UK merged with Deutsche Telekom's T-Mobile UK to form a joint venture, EE in 2010. EE continued to operate the Orange brand until February 2015, when new connections and upgrades on Orange tariffs were withdrawn. Existing Orange customers could continue on their plans until March 2019.

== History ==
=== Formation: 1990–1994 ===
The inception of the Orange brand occurred in 1990 in the United Kingdom with the formation of Microtel Communications, a consortium initially formed by Pactel Corporation (American), British Aerospace, Millicom and Matra (French); and later wholly owned by BAe. In July 1991, the Hong Kong-based conglomerate Hutchison Whampoa, through a stock swap deal with BAe, acquired a controlling stake of 65% in Microtel, who by then had won a licence to develop a personal communications network in the United Kingdom. As part of the deal, BAe gained a 30% stake in Hutchison Telecommunications (UK).

=== Launch of Orange and expansion: 1994–1999 ===
Hutchison renamed Microtel to Orange Personal Communications Services on 28 March 1994; and on 28 April 1994, the Orange 1,800 MHz GSM network was launched. The Orange brand, at the time an unusual name for a telecommunications firm, was created by a team at Microtel led by Chris Moss (marketing director) and supported by Martin Keogh, Rob Furness and Ian Pond. The brand consultancy Wolff Olins was charged with designing the brand values and logo, and advertising agency WCRS created the slogan "The future's bright, the future's Orange". The team that launched Orange in the UK was led by Malcolm Way, and later Hans Snook who became the chief executive.

A holding company structure was adopted in 1995 with the establishment of Orange plc. In April 1996, Orange went public and floated on the London Stock Exchange and NASDAQ, majority owned by Hutchison (48.22%), followed by BAe (21.1%). In June 1996, it became the youngest company to enter the FTSE 100, valued at £2.4 billion. By July 1997 Orange had gained one million customers.

=== Acquisition of Orange and part of France Télécom: 1999–2009 ===
The stint as a public company came to an end in October 1999, when it was acquired for US$33 billion by the German conglomerate Mannesmann AG. Mannesmann's acquisition of Orange triggered Vodafone to make a hostile takeover bid for the German company. Shortly thereafter, in February 2000, Vodafone acquired Mannesmann for US$183bn and divested Orange, as EU regulations would not allow it to hold two mobile licences. In May 2000, France Télécom announced the acquisition of the global operations of Orange from Vodafone for US$37bn, and the transaction was completed in August 2000.

France Télécom subsequently rebranded all its mobile telecommunications as Orange. The company was initially 100% owned by France Télécom (although there were and remain minority investors in some of the national operating companies). In 2001 15% was sold in an IPO, but in 2003 the outstanding shares were bought back by France Télécom.

=== Merger with T-Mobile UK: 2009–2015 ===
On 8 September 2009, France Télécom and T-Mobile parent Deutsche Telekom announced they were in advanced talks to merge their UK operations to create the largest mobile operator, which would have 37% of the market. The Orange brand was to be retained for the first eighteen months at least.

Consumer Focus and the Communications Consumer Panel sent a joint letter to the then Competition Commissioner Neelie Kroes in December 2009, asking for the merger to be investigated by authorities in the United Kingdom, rather than Brussels. The British Office of Fair Trading joined this call by asking the EU to allow it to investigate the proposed deal in February 2010, saying that it believed the merger could have a 'significant' effect on competition.

On 1 March 2010, the European Commission approved the merger, on condition that the combined company sell 25% of the spectrum it owned on the 1,800 MHz radio band, and amend a network sharing agreement with smaller rival 3.

On 1 April 2010, Deutsche Telekom and France Télécom completed the merger of their UK operations, causing Orange UK and T-Mobile UK to cease to exist, although the brands were to be maintained until 2015 for new customers, and 2019 for existing customers. On 11 May 2010, it was announced that both the Orange and T-Mobile brands would remain on British high streets, although their new merged parent company would be called EE. The Orange Home UK broadband service was rebranded as EE Broadband on 30 October 2010.

=== Phase-out of brand: 2015-2019 ===
In February 2015, Orange UK's parent company EE announced that Orange (along with T-Mobile) tariffs were withdrawn for new customers. Existing customers wishing to upgrade had to choose an EE price plan.

Starting in July 2015, Orange pay-as-you-go customers also had the ability to dial premium rate and directory enquiries numbers withdrawn. Those who needed to call such services were advised to transfer to an EE plan.

Remaining Orange customers were informed in early 2019 that they had to switch to an EE plan by March, or their services would be terminated. This marked the end of Orange service in the United Kingdom.

== Services ==
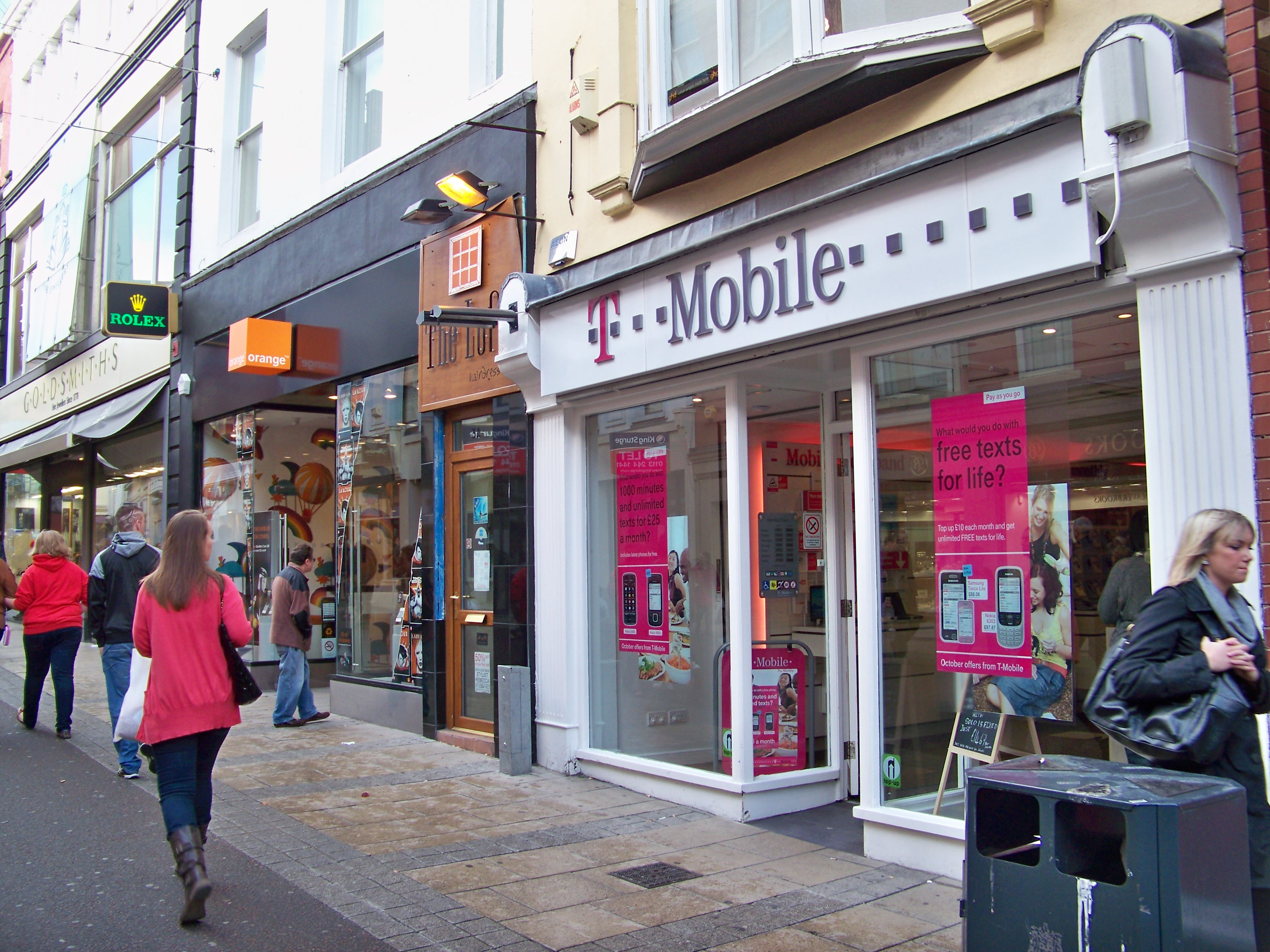
Adjacent Orange and T-Mobile shops in Leeds in 2009. The two were later re-branded as EE stores.

Orange offered pay-as-you-go and pay monthly service plans. Pay-as-you-go customers could top-up their phone via a swipe card, over the internet, by voucher or via a credit or debit card.

Until the EE takeover, Orange operated GPRS, EDGE and 3G HSDPA services. This has since been merged with T-Mobile's network. Orange's 2G network covered 99% of the UK population, and was the largest integrated 3G/2.5G network in the UK. In 2009, Orange UK decided to outsource its mobile network. In March 2009, Nokia Siemens Networks was chosen to manage, plan, expand, optimise and provide maintenance services for the Orange 2G/3G mobile network. Orange customers were only able to access the UK's biggest 3G network along with EE's standard 2G network. Customers that wished to use EE's 4G network, had to upgrade to EE from their Orange plan.

Orange also provided DSL services under the same brand. Originally operated as Freeserve in the UK, it was bought-out by France Télécom, rebranded as Wanadoo and on 1 June 2006 Wanadoo was rebranded Orange. When Orange launched its DSL broadband service it offered it for 'free', joining TalkTalk in the foray for market share. The company attempted to converge its mobile and DSL broadband products and offered broadband services alongside its mobile services, at a subsidised rate (up to £15 off full price per month for Orange mobile customers in an Orange Broadband network area). Orange offered 'triple-play' services converging mobile, landline and DSL broadband. Orange on its most expensive broadband service used to offer a Livebox which integrates VoIP technology as well as WiFi, but in more recent times, this has been replaced by a Netgear router.

Orange also created an energy harvesting T-shirt and shoes.

=== Price plans ===
In 2000, Orange introduced a limited plan called 'Out Here', designed for users who did not make a lot of calls but needed to keep in touch. For a one-off payment of £15, users received a SIM with five free texts every day for life without ever having to top up again.

In April 2006, Orange changed its contract offering by offering four packages to customers, named Dolphin, Canary, Racoon and Panther. On some plans there were unlimited minutes (to landlines or Orange UK mobiles), texts or data. In addition to this Orange offered dedicated business plans: Solo and Sense (a sharer plan). Orange also offered 'magic numbers': unlimited free calls to other Orange UK mobiles on contract or "talk for an hour, pay for a minute" on PAYG.

In April 2008, Orange extended its animals to pay-as-you-go customers, introducing Dolphin, Raccoon, Canary, Camel, and Monkey. Dolphin, Monkey and Canary offer bonuses, whilst Raccoon is a discounted call rate and Camel is for a call-abroad tariff giving discounted calls to foreign countries.

Orange, like other mobile networks, offered an "Internet Everywhere" tariff on pay-as-you-go, pay monthly and business plans. The tariffs names for pay monthly were aligned with the animals' theme in May 2010 when Orange offered both Dolphin and Raccoon plans for internet use available on both 1 month and 12-month contracts. In August 2011, the price plans were revised, and names changed to Small, Medium, and Large. Similar to home broadband, Orange mobile customers received a £5 discount on their mobile broadband plan. The business plans remained as "Business Everywhere". The 12-month plans came with a USB modem (or dongle) for free. The customer was required to pay a small price for the dongle on the 1-month plans. A portable WiFi dongle could also be purchased, dubbed "Mobile WiFi". The service operated across the network's EDGE, 3G, HSDPA and HSUPA network and offered speeds of up to 3.6 Mbit/s. Orange announced in June 2008 that this speed would be increased to 7.2 Mbit/s in the top 30 UK cities and 14.4 Mbit/s in the top five cities.

=== Orange shops ===
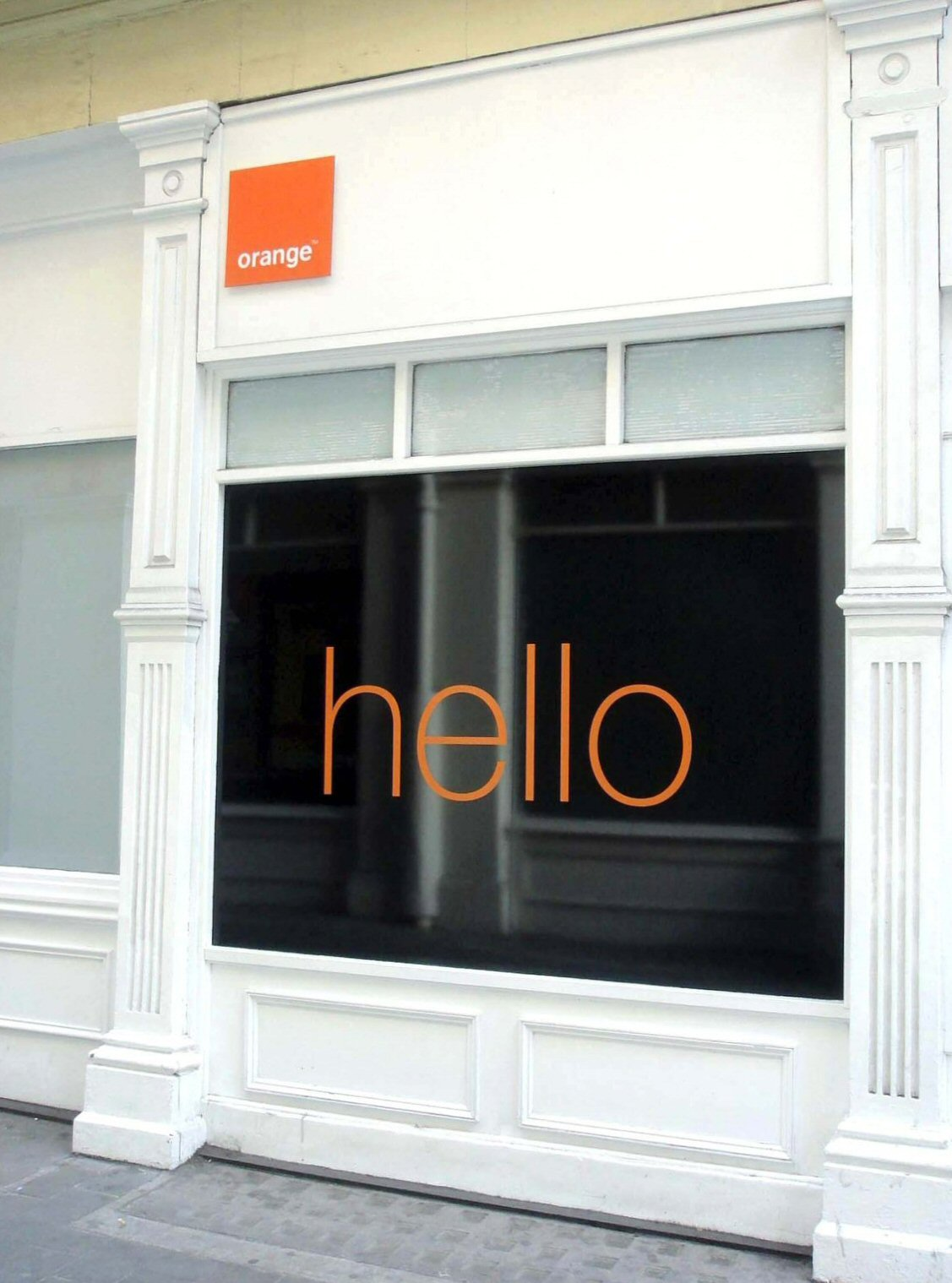
An Orange Shop in London, UK

Orange, like its competitors, operated a retail estate, with over 300 stores. These were branded as "The Orange Shop" and operated as an indirect sales channel. In September 2012, Orange's parent company EE announced that all Orange and T-Mobile stores were to be re-branded as EE stores by 30 October 2012, the launch date of their 4G network, offering products from all three brands of the company. There are now around 700 EE stores open in the UK. After February 2015, only EE products were available in stores.

== Marketing ==
=== Launch advertising ===
When Orange UK launched, they were the fourth mobile phone brand to enter the British market, and hired advertising agency WCRS to help them stand out among their competition. According to Robin Wright of the agency, "you seldom become market leader, which was Orange's goal, just by imitating the previous three, so we had to find something new, something different." Concurrently, mobile phone sales were stronger than those of any other consumer good in the mid-1990s. Part of Orange's aim with their launch campaign was to change the image of mobile phones. According to Fay Ripley in The Ads That Changed the World (2003), "instead of being an annoying yuppie accessory, it would be the route to a brighter future."

The first television advertisement, Launch, aired in 1994, directed by Frank Budgen for WCRS. Speaking about the commercial in 2003, Wright said: "In any Orange ad, you'll see a total absence of a mobile phone. We never showed a mobile phone in any Orange ad ever. We were not a mobile phone. We were a wire-free network. It is that spontaneity as well as simplicity [that] we wanted to capture. Did the campaign work? Ask the competition. Orange is now the number one network in the UK". Orange's emphasis on branding, rather than the product itself, was consistent with the British advertising climate in the 1990s.

=== Orange Gold Spots ===
Until 2012, at most cinemas across the UK, advertisements for Orange were shown directly before the film, after the other adverts and film trailers, to remind people to turn off their mobile phones if they hadn't done so already. These were officially known as 'Orange Gold Spots'. The adverts featured various celebrities including; Rob Lowe, Dennis Hopper, Macaulay Culkin, Patrick Swayze, Carrie Fisher, John Cleese, Ewan McGregor, and The A-Team. Throughout the sketch, a pair of fictional Orange executives, played by Brennan Brown and Steve Furst, manipulate an idea into film which promotes Orange through product placement, despite the product being completely 'out-of-place' (a mobile phone in a Western Film is one example); the catch line is "Don't let a mobile phone ruin your movie. Please switch it off". After five years, Orange changed advertising agencies and replaced the fictional Orange Film Funding Board with adverts in which the characters now run a film studio, remaking classic films with mobile phone references inserted.

In April 2010, Gold Spots featuring specific forthcoming films replaced the Orange Film Funding Board parodies. The new adverts, promoting specific movies released by 20th Century Fox, Walt Disney Pictures, Vertigo Films and Nu Image feature the stars of the movie filming scenes in-character with Orange product placement, before breaking character to complain. The first advert featured the cast of The A-Team, followed by a spot starring Jack Black in Gulliver's Travels, Jesse Eisenberg and Anne Hathaway in Rio, Potiche, The Muppets, The Expendables 2 and The Sweeney.

In 2012, the Orange adverts were replaced with adverts for parent company EE, featuring Kevin Bacon.

In addition to this Orange offered 'Orange Wednesdays' from 2003 until 2014. This enabled any Orange customer to apply for 2 for 1 cinema tickets at participating cinemas, by text message. This was a result of Orange attempting to increase cinema visits during the quiet weekly periods. The Orange Wednesdays promotion also allowed Orange customers a 2 for 1 main courses with complimentary appetizers at PizzaExpress restaurants. Both the cinema ticket and meal offers only required a text ticket from Orange, which is entered at point of purchase. EE announced on 11 December 2014 that the Orange Wednesday promotion will end on 25 February 2015.

=== Sponsorship ===
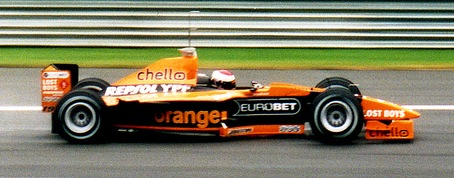
An Orange Arrows F1 car.

Orange sponsored the Arrows Formula One team from 2000 until 2002.

In spirit with Orange's commitment to cinema Orange sponsored the British Academy of Film and Television Arts Awards until 2012 which includes an award in its own name – the Orange Rising Star Award. Sponsorship switched to EE from 2013 onwards.

Orange UK has also shown a commitment to music which has included partnering with the Glastonbury Festival to provide mobile charging facilities and offers a music bursary.

=== Slogans ===
In 2008, Orange's slogan, "The future's bright – the future's Orange" was dropped after many years by its CEO Tom Alexander in a bid to save its ailing fortunes.

From July 2008 to 2013, "I am"' became the main slogan, shortened from "I am who I am because of everyone", promoted by a global advertising campaign.

== Controversies ==
=== Data protection ===
In 2007, Orange was found to be in breach of the Data Protection Act 1998 by the Information Commissioner's Office (ICO) after complaints from customers about the use of their personal information. Orange has since agreed to reinforce the requirements of the Act. The company was also criticised in the press for its handling of personal data, following complaints of Orange customer data being used by independent mobile sales companies in the practice of slamming. Orange denied any involvement.

=== Attempted price increases ===
In August 2009, Orange attempted to increase the cost of its services to customers already under contract. Users were informed that legally, they were allowed to cancel their contract, as this was a breach of contract. Orange reverted their decision, and the price hikes did not go ahead.

In December 2011, Orange sent a text to its customer base to notify them that they were increasing monthly contract fees by just below RPI rates. They imposed a 4.34% increase, coming into effect on 8 January. It was identified that the clause that supposedly allowed Orange to increase by inflation mid-contract, clause 4.3.1, was flawed as it referenced a Statistical Office which no longer exists. Specifically, Orange referenced "the All Items Index of Retail Prices published by the Central Statistical Office in the Monthly Digest of Statistics". Orange maintain that their inaccurate wording in previous contracts was legally binding but chose to settle all known court cases brought against them on this issue.

Two years later, following its merger with T-Mobile, the combined companies again signalled their intention to increase the agreed tariffs of existing pay monthly customers. Clause 4.3.1 has now changed to disallow the customer from cancelling their contract if "we give you written notice to increase the charges (as a percentage) by an amount equal to or less than the percentage increase in the All Items Index of Retail Prices or any other statistical measure of inflation published by any government body authorised to publish measures of inflation from time to time, and published on a date as close as reasonably possible before the date on which we send you written notice". This led to many customers using the change of clause to cancel their mobile phone contracts with Orange.
