= TalkTalk Telecom Group Plc v Ofcom =

- Court: Court of Appeal
- Citation: [2013] EWCA Civ 1318

Keywords
- Telecommunications

TalkTalk Telecom Group Plc v Office of Communications [2013] EWCA Civ 1318 is an EU law case relevant for UK enterprise law, concerning telecommunications.

== Facts ==
TalkTalk claimed that charge controls should be imposed upon BT. In 2010, Ofcom reviewed competition in the wholesale broadband market. BT was the main provider. Before Ofcom published its Market Review Determination, TalkTalk said it would install its own broadband equipment in 700 local exchanges belonging to BT, as yet unspecified. As they were unknown, Ofcom ignored them in defining ‘Market 1’ and said even if TalkTalk deployed its plans, BT would still have a market share of at least 70-80%. This led Ofcom to say BT had significant market power in ‘Market 1’ and imposed a charge control, published in July 2011. By then, TalkTalk had completed unbundling, setting up in 17 exchanges in Market 1. Under CA 2003 s 86, Ofcom concluded there was no material change in Market 1, and BT’s market share would stay above 70%.

== Judgment ==
The Court of Appeal held by a majority that Ofcom’s determination was correct and charge controls under CA 2003 section 86 could remain. McFarlane LJ and Sir Timothy Lloyd held that, though the circumstances had changed, it could not be seen as a material change under CA 2003 s 86. If forecasts of change had not been falsified to a material extent, there was no material change. The actual changes were within the scope of Ofcom’s predictions. Sir Bernard Rix dissented, arguing Ofcom substituted a new ‘Market 1’ definition, relating solely to ‘exchanges where only BT is present’, and should make a fresh Market Review Determination.

Sir Timothy Lloyd said the following.

151. The essential difference that lies between the judgments of each of my Lords is whether, at the time of the Charge Control Determination, Ofcom substituted a new definition of Market 1 for that which had been adopted in the Market Review Determination [per Sir Bernard Rix at paragraphs 34 to 44] or whether the changed factual circumstances that by then existed were no more than the acting out of events that were reasonably within the market forecast made by Ofcom at the time of the Market Review Determination [per Sir Timothy Lloyd at paragraphs 140 to 146].

152. In his analysis, Sir Bernard cites a number of factors arising from the Market Review Determination but he lays particular emphasis upon the fact that the definition of Market 1 at that time related solely to 'exchanges where only BT is present' and in doing so Ofcom made a distinction between exchanges where another PO had 'committed' plans in relation to a specific exchange or merely 'uncommitted plans'. At paragraphs 20 to 23 the relevant passages are set out and the express references to the distinction between committed or uncommitted plans have been italicised. As is plain, by the time of the Charge Control Determination the situation on the ground had changed in that Talk Talk had committed to rolling out LLU-based services in a number of specific Market 1 exchanges. For Sir Bernard, Ofcom's decision to press on with the Charge Control Determination on the basis that its original definition of Market 1 remained valid is untenable [paragraphs 37 and 38] as the list of Market 1 exchanges was no longer confined to exchanges where there was no committed 2nd PO in addition to BT. He holds that Ofcom were in reality now accepting a revised definition of Market 1 as containing exchanges where, whether or not BT is challenged by another operator's committed unbundling in a specified exchange, BT's market share is projected not to fall below 70% by the end of the review period; in consequence Sir Bernard holds that it was necessary for Ofcom to conduct a fresh Market Review Determination.

153. Whilst I understand this essential reasoning within Sir Bernard Rix's judgment, together with the other supporting points that he makes, and despite the true respect that I have for his wide knowledge and extensive experience of these matters, I prefer the analysis given by Sir Timothy Lloyd in his judgment. Although Ofcom did draw a line in the Market Review Determination between exchanges where a 2nd PO was 'committed' and those which were 'uncommitted', and Sir Bernard is right to highlight that clear distinction in identifying exchanges at the start of the review period, Ofcom also made it plain that it was taking a forward view, that it anticipated that Talk Talk would choose to unbundle in some of those exchanges during the review period and that 'even if Talk Talk deploys towards the start of the review period BT's market share would be likely to be at least 70 to 80 percent in the exchanges where Talk Talk deploys at the end of the period' (MRD paragraph 3.182). Sir Timothy Lloyd is right to have highlighted paragraphs 3.178 and 3.182 by repeating them [paragraph 91] as they were expressly in Ofcom's contemplation at the time of the Market Review Determination. The principal purpose of the process on which Ofcom were engaged was to look forward over the three year period of the review and to apply, where necessary, price structure to the market in the interest of promoting competition; they were required to execute this task in relation to a market which was bound to change and develop throughout that period. Given that the definition of Market 1 readily contemplated that during the review period some of the 'BT only' exchanges would change to ones in which Talk Talk was active, I agree with Sir Timothy that the fact that, by the Charge Control Determination, some of those changes were already taking place cannot of itself by regarded as a material change for the purposes of section 86 [paragraph 126] and I agree that Ofcom's forecast of the market was not falsified by the events that had taken place on the ground when the Charge Control Determination was made [paragraph 130].

== See also ==
- United Kingdom enterprise law
- EU law
