= Communications Consumer Panel =

The Communications Consumer Panel is an independent UK body that works to protect and promote people's interests in the communications sector. Consisting of eight independent experts, the Panel carries out research, provides advice and encourages Ofcom, the UK Government, the European Union, communications industry and others to look at issues through the eyes of consumers, citizens and small businesses.

== History ==
The Panel was established by the Communications Act 2003 as the independent, policy advisory body on consumer interests in the telecommunications, broadcasting and spectrum markets (with the exception of content issues).

== Objective ==
The Panel's objective is to: “protect and promote the interests of consumers, citizens and small businesses in the communications sector by giving advice to Ofcom, the EU, Government, industry and others.”

== Relationship with Ofcom ==
The Panel is often described as a ‘critical friend’ to regulatory authority Ofcom. Ofcom shares information and ideas with the Panel early in the regulatory process, before consulting formally with other stakeholders. In 2015, the Panel worked closely with Ofcom on the regulator's UK Calling campaign, helping ensure that the campaign was clear and easy to understand.
