= Twitter joke trial =

United Kingdom legal case

Chambers v Director of Public Prosecutions
- Court: High Court of Justice (Queen's Bench Division)
- Full case name: Paul Chambers v Director of Public Prosecutions
- Decided: 27 July 2012
- Citation: [2012] EWHC 2157 (QB)
- Transcript: High Court transcript

Case history
- Appealed from: Doncaster Magistrates' Court

Court membership
- Judges sitting: Lord Judge CJ; Owen J; Griffith Williams J

Case opinions
- The message was not objectively menacing; the conviction was therefore quashed.

Keywords
- Communications Act 2003; Freedom of speech; Mens rea; Twitter

R v Paul Chambers (appealed to the High Court as Chambers v Director of Public Prosecutions), popularly known as the Twitter Joke Trial, was a United Kingdom legal case centred on the conviction of a man under the Communications Act 2003 for posting a joke about destroying an airport on Twitter, a message which police regarded as "menacing". The conviction in the Magistrates' court was widely condemned as a miscarriage of justice, but was upheld on appeal to the Crown Court. Chambers appealed against the Crown Court decision to the High Court, which ultimately quashed the conviction.

== Background ==
During late December 2009 and early January 2010, cold weather had resulted in considerable disruption across northern England. Robin Hood Airport in South Yorkshire was one of many airports which was forced to cancel flights. On 6 January 2010, an intending traveller, Paul Chambers, then aged 26, who was planning to fly to Northern Ireland to meet his then girlfriend (later wife), posted a message on Twitter:

Paul Chambers
(@pauljchambers)
tweeted:

Crap! Robin Hood airport is closed. You've got a week and a bit to get your shit together otherwise I'm blowing the airport sky high!!

6 January 2010

A week later, an off-duty manager at the airport found the message while doing an unrelated computer search. The airport management considered the message to be "not credible" as a threat, but contacted the police anyway. Chambers was arrested by anti-terror police at his office, his house was searched and his mobile phone, laptop and desktop hard drive were confiscated. He was later charged with "sending a public electronic message that was grossly offensive or of an indecent, obscene or menacing character contrary to the Communications Act 2003". On 10 May, he was found guilty at Doncaster Magistrates' Court, fined £385 and ordered to pay £600 costs. As a consequence he lost his job as an administrative and financial supervisor at a car parts company.

== Response ==
A number of legal commentators and celebrities criticised the conviction and called for it to be overturned. They include journalist Nick Cohen, who drew comparison with Milan Kundera's anti-communist novel The Joke; television writer Graham Linehan; and the comedian and television presenter Stephen Fry, who offered to pay Chambers's fine and subsequent legal bills.

== Appeals ==
Chambers lost an appeal against his conviction. Judge Jacqueline Davies, sitting with two magistrates, heard his appeal in Doncaster Crown Court; she judged that the tweet contained "menace" and that Chambers must have known that it might be taken seriously. Thousands of Twitter users responded by reposting Chambers' Tweet including the hashtag #iamspartacus, in reference to the climactic "I am Spartacus!" scene in the 1960 film Spartacus.

A further appeal to the High Court was heard on 8 February 2012, in which the two judge panel of Lord Justice Gross and Mr Justice Irwin failed to reach a decision after initially reserving judgement. The appeal by case stated was made by Chambers' barristers, Ben Emmerson QC and Sarah Przybylska; David Allen Green, who acted for Chambers in earlier proceedings, also acted as his solicitor, through Preiskel & Co LLP. The appeal was entirely on points of law and centred on the correct interpretation of section 127(1) of the Communications Act 2003.

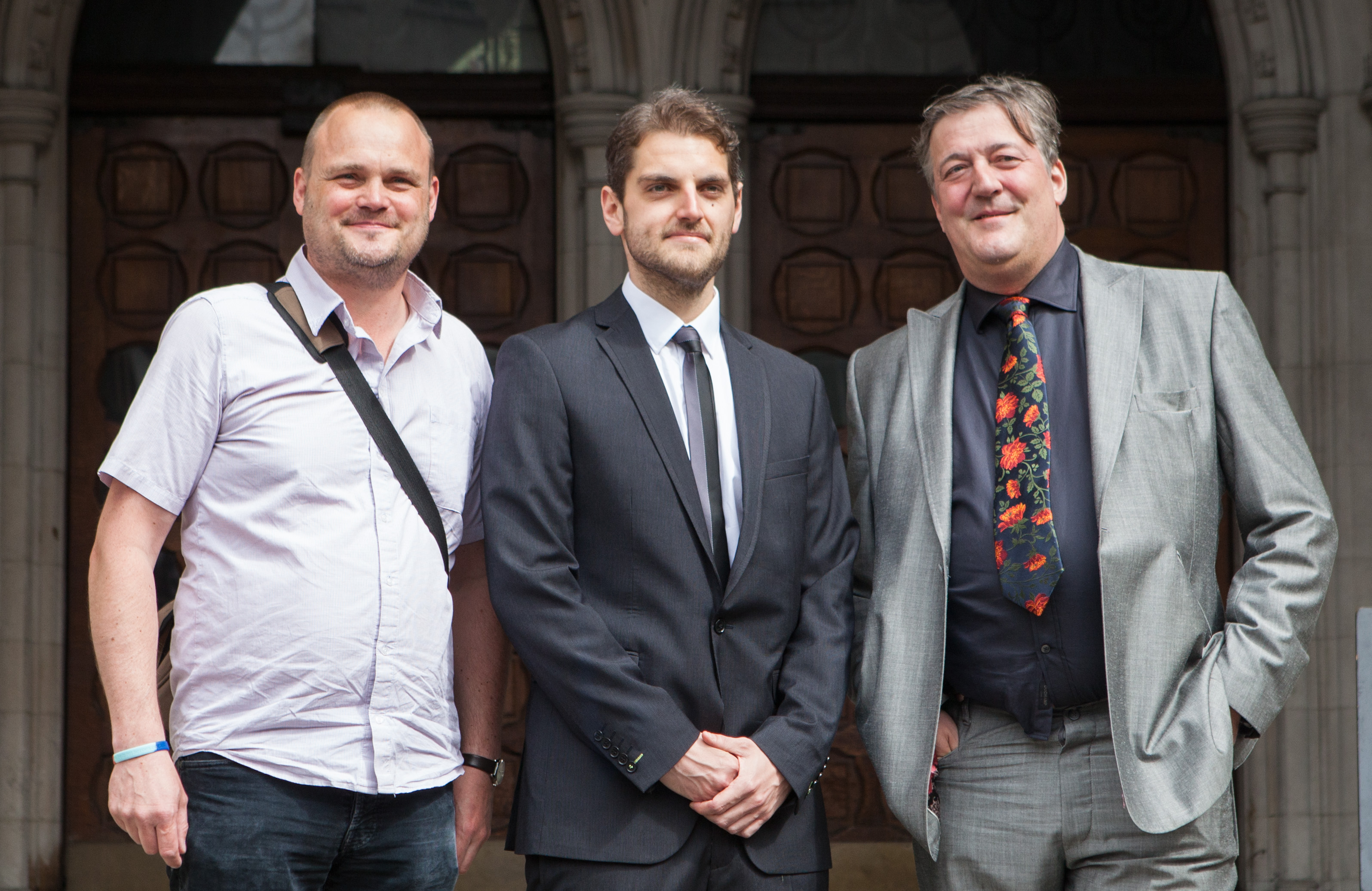
Chambers (centre), with Al Murray (left) and Stephen Fry (right) outside the High Court on 27 June 2012

A second High Court appeal, before a panel of three judges, headed by the Lord Chief Justice Lord Judge, opened on 22 June 2012. One of the arguments made by Chambers' barrister for this last appeal, John Cooper QC, was that if the tweet was "menacing" so was John Betjeman's poem, "Slough", pleading "Come, friendly bombs, and fall on Slough!". He also asked whether Shakespeare would have been prosecuted if he had tweeted his line from Henry VI, Part 2 (Act IV, Scene 2), "The first thing we do, let's kill all the lawyers". The latter reportedly drew laughter from the judges. On 27 June, the judges announced a reserved judgement. Chambers arrived at court accompanied by Stephen Fry and the comedian Al Murray.

Chambers's conviction was quashed on 27 July 2012. The approved judgement concluded that "a message which does not create fear or apprehension in those to whom it is communicated, or who may reasonably be expected to see it, falls outside this provision [of the 2003 Act]". Accordingly, the appeal against conviction was "allowed on the basis that this 'tweet' did not constitute or include a message of a menacing character".

It has been claimed by sources talking to The Guardian that staff at the Crown Prosecution Service had been in favour of dropping the case, to the point of informing Chambers, via his solicitor, that they would not oppose the final appeal, but had then been overruled by the head of the service, the Director of Public Prosecutions, Keir Starmer. Chambers' MP, Louise Mensch, called for a House of Commons committee to investigate Starmer's behaviour. However, a spokesperson for the CPS said that Starmer had not taken part in decisions about the case.

== Impact of the case ==
The case led to a review of the guidance for the Crown Prosecution Service of their use of Section 127 and other speech related offences for online content, which attempted to narrow the use of the section in prosecutions. The "grossly offensive" test has remained controversial and has been further reviewed by the Law Commission, which examined offences to "improve the protection afforded to victims" while providing "better safeguards for freedom of expression".

The result was the commission's "2021 Modernising Communications Offences report", and the recommendations made in that report were accepted by the Government in February 2022. The Government pledged to use the Online Safety Bill to amend the law to implement the recommendations. The Law Commission stated:

The reformed offences will refocus the criminal law on communications where the sender specifically intended to cause harm, and that pose a real and substantial risk of causing at least serious distress. It will no longer be enough that the communication was “grossly offensive” regardless of whether harm was likely or intended.

== See also ==
- Horizon Group v. Bonnen
- Count Dankula
