= Audiovisual Media Services Regulations 2014 =

United Kingdom legislation

- Statutory Instrument
- Parliament of the United Kingdom
- Citation: SI 2014/2916
- Introduced by: Ed Vaizey (Department for Culture, Media and Sport)

Dates
- Made: 4 November 2014
- Laid before Parliament: 6 November 2014
- Commencement: 1 December 2014

Other legislation
- Made under: European Communities Act 1972

Status: Current legislation

Text of statute as originally enacted

The Audiovisual Media Services Regulations 2014 (SI 2014/2916) is a statutory instrument of the Parliament of the United Kingdom that applies regulations to R18-rated pornography that is available through paid video on demand or other streaming platforms. Prior to the regulations coming into force, neither Ofcom nor the British Board of Film Classification (BBFC) had jurisdiction over such content. In force from 1 December 2014, these regulations were made by the Secretary of State in exercise of the powers conferred by section 2(2) of the European Communities Act 1972.

The regulations originally prohibited the depiction of a number of specific sexual acts in online pornography based in the UK. In 2019 the regulations were changed after a review of obscenity laws, legalising the depiction of these acts provided they are performed consensually, do not harm the participants and are unlikely to be viewed by anyone aged under 18.

== Content ==
British obscenity law prohibits obscene publications, including pornography that may seriously harm the performer or threaten their life. Prior to the regulations coming into force, online pornography was not subject to the same regulations as pornography available for purchase in sex shops; the intention of the regulations was to create a parity between the two forms. Material that was already banned by the BBFC in home video – and therefore restricted under the regulations – included:

- Sadomasochistic material going beyond the "trifling or transient" infliction of pain or injury.
- Physical restraint which prevents participants from indicating a withdrawal of consent.
- Urolagnia
- Erotic asphyxiation
- Facesitting
- Fisting

The Department for Culture, Media and Sport defended the regulations by stating that the BBFC's R18 certificate was a "tried and tested" method of protecting children, and highlighted the need for consistency in regulation. Peter Johnson, the chair of the Authority for Television On Demand (ATVOD), stated that he believed unregistered material from overseas would violate the Obscene Publications Act 1959, and credit card payments to premium sites would be able to be blocked.

== Protests ==
Upon going into force on 1 December 2014, the regulations were subject to immediate criticism, much of it arising from the debates around female ejaculation. A Vice interview with BBFC officials indicated that apparent female ejaculation was regularly cut due to restrictions on urolagnia, and the difficulty of distinguishing what could be female ejaculation from straightforward urination. A blog for the New Statesman highlighted that many of the activities were popular in the LGBT and BDSM communities or related to expressions of female sexuality. Myles Jackman, an obscenity lawyer, expressed concerns that the regulations set a dangerous precedent and described pornography as "the canary in the coal mine" of freedom of speech.

The regulations were subject to a protest by opponents in Parliament Square on 12 December 2014, organised by sex worker and Clacton by-election candidate Charlotte Rose, which included a mass demonstration of facesitting and singing of the Monty Python song "Sit on My Face". One protest sign read, "Urine for a shock if you expect us to stop." Rose and other female erotic performers expressed concern that the regulations were approved without a vote or public consent, and that the changes could be indicative of further changes to obscenity law.

In response to the controversy, Julian Huppert, the Liberal Democrat MP for Cambridge, laid down an Early Day Motion seeking a debate to annul the regulations, which was signed by fellow Lib Dem MPs David Ward and John Leech, and independent MP Mike Hancock. Huppert stated that any regulations on sex or pornography should be based on issues of consent or risk and not "moral objection. Huppert's EDM also received support from Deputy Prime Minister and Lib Dem leader Nick Clegg, who stated that politicians should not be in a role to judge anybody's sexual behaviour, and that supporting sexual freedom was a "classic liberal assertion".

== Feminist opposition ==
Following the December 2014 face-sitting protest outside of Parliament, the feminist magazine Bitch criticized the regulations for censoring women's sexuality on the basis that "[t]he laws seem to specifically target acts that prioritize female pleasure or indicate female dominance." The article pointed out the double standard in permitting men—but not women—to assume a dominant position during oral sex acts, and accused the regulations of perpetuating the sexual subordination of women in porn by writing pornography's gender bias into law. Its author Catherine Scott explained:

For example, while female ejaculation is banned, male ejaculation and its consumption remain acceptable. Although the British Board of Film Classification reports that the pornographic act it most regularly censors is "scenes of choking and gagging during deep throat fellatio", there is no suggestion of banning these acts—only ones that see a woman receiving pleasure from sitting on a man's face.

Pandora Blake, webmaster of the BDSM-themed site Dreams of Spanking, insinuated that the sites shut down for failure to comply with the regulations "have been gay sites and female domination. No BDSM sites with female submissives have been targeted because that [women's subordination] is apparently fine."

== See also ==
- Censorship in the United Kingdom
- Digital Economy Act 2017
- Operation Spanner
- Pornography in the United Kingdom
- Section 63 of the Criminal Justice and Immigration Act 2008
