= ATVOD =

UK television regulator (2010–2015)

The Authority for Television on Demand
- Abbreviation: ATVOD
- Formation: 2010
- Dissolved: 2015
- Type: Private company limited by guarantee
- Legal status: Quango
- Purpose: independent co-regulator for the editorial content of UK video on demand services
- Headquarters: 27 Sheet Street, Windsor, UK
- Region served: United Kingdom
- Independent Chair: Ruth Evans
- Independent Deputy Chair: Nigel Walmsley
- chief executive officer: Pete Johnson
- Board of directors: Robin Foster, Ian McBride, Paul Whiteing, Alexander Kann, Nicola Phillips, James Tatam
- Formerly called: The Association for Television On-Demand

The Authority for Television on Demand (ATVOD) was an industry body designated by Ofcom as the "co-regulator" of television on demand (VOD) in the UK from 2010 until 2015. ATVOD was founded following a European Union directive on the regulation of audiovisual media. It was responsible for regulating on-demand services such as ITV Player and Channel 4's All 4, as well as paid-for content on websites which were deemed to be "tv-like". ATVOD's role with regard to VOD ended on 31 December 2015, when the function was taken over by Ofcom directly.

== Origins ==
The Audiovisual Media Services Directive 2007 (2007/65/EU) of the European Union was implemented into UK law through Part 4A of the Communications Act 2003. The Directive updated the Television Without Frontiers Directive 1989 (89/552/EEC) to cover the extension of traditional television regulation to TV-like VOD. This directive was implemented in the UK on 19 December 2009 with regulations amending the Communications Act 2003. As a result, Ofcom consulted with the Department for Culture, Media and Sport about proposals for the creation of a regulator for UK-based VOD.

ATVOD, formerly the Association for Television On-Demand, had originally been created as a self-regulatory industry body with the support and encouragement of the government. It was chosen to be Ofcom's co-regulator of UK-based VOD in editorial matters and the Advertising Standards Authority was chosen to be Ofcom's co-regulator of UK-based VOD in advertising matters. This arrangement was given legal force when the government issued the Audiovisual Media Services Regulations 2010 which came into force on 18 March 2010. The Communications Act 2003 was further revised giving ATVOD greater enforcement powers in relation to VOD services. Minimum editorial and advertising standards were drawn up and published.

== Regulation ==
Legislation enabled ATVOD to regulate "On-Demand Programme Services" (ODPS) as the body designated by Ofcom. A service was considered an ODPS if it met the following criteria:

- The principal purpose of the service was the provision of programmes, and
- the form and content of such programmes were comparable to those normally included in television programme services.
- The programmes were offered by the service "on-demand". That is, they could be selected by a user, and viewed at a time chosen by the user.
- The programmes were received by the user through an electronic communications network (including terrestrial broadcast, satellite broadcast, cable network or via Internet Protocol).
- There was a person who exercised editorial responsibility in selecting and organising the programmes, and
- That person made the service available for use by the public generally, and
- That person was under the jurisdiction of the United Kingdom as defined by the AVMSD.

Any person who intended to provide an ODPS :

- Had to give advance notification to ATVOD;
- Had to pay a fee to ATVOD;
- Had to retain a copy of all content for 42 days from the date it was last made publicly available;
- Could not provide material which incited hatred based on race, sex, religion or nationality, nor provide material which might seriously impair the physical, mental or moral development of under eighteens;
- Had to abide by rules on advertising, sponsorship, and product placement, but which Ofcom decided would be regulated by the Advertising Standards Authority rather than ATVOD.

The question as to which services fell under ATVOD's regulation was tested on an ongoing basis. Appeals against ATVOD's decisions were referred to Ofcom. Ofcom ruled that YouTube content did not fall under ATVOD's remit. However, in February 2014 ATVOD determined that the feature film streaming and downloading service provided by Sainsbury's Entertainment did fall under its remit. In contrast, an Ofcom decision in August 2014 determined that The Urban Chick Supremacy Cell, a small-time website providing paid-for bondage and sadomasochistic content, did not constitute TV on-demand.

Sanctions against those who failed to comply with these regulations included fines of up to £250,000, suspension of service and criminal prosecution.

== Adult websites ==
In practice the majority of ATVOD's work consisted of regulating UK websites that hosted videos to ensure that services containing adult content could not be accessed by users under 18. In September 2013 it ran a seminar for small businesses to explain VOD regulations. Its chief executive Peter Johnson said: "Asking visitors to a website to click an 'I am 18' button or enter a date of birth or use a debit card is not sufficient – if they are going to offer explicit sex material they must know that their customers are 18, just as they would in the 'offline' world." ATVOD believed that websites should require the user to supply valid credit card details or other personal information that could be cross-referenced with the electoral roll or another ID database, thus establishing the user's identity. Credit card age-verification alone was unfeasible since children over the age of fourteen but under eighteen could be added to an adult guarantor's account as an additional cardholder. Failure by commercial websites to obtain proof that the user was over 18 before allowing access to adult content was considered by ATVOD to be a breach of the Obscene Publications Act 1959. Johnson considered it possible that the act restricted the activities of adult websites based outside the UK if their content was downloaded within the UK. Johnson also confirmed that in the case of non-pay sites containing user-uploaded material it was the uploader that was legally responsible rather than the service provider.

ATVOD only had the jurisdiction to take action against websites that were based in the UK. Consequently, in 2013 the regulator proposed the introduction of a new licensing system. Licences would have only been granted to websites that had suitable age checks in place. Unlicensed websites would have had their payments from UK customers blocked. Talks between ATVOD and financial institutions including the Payments Council, the British Bankers Association and the UK Cards Association took place in October 2013. Subsequently, ATVOD provided the UK Government and the European Commission with detailed briefings on policy options. In March 2014 ATVOD proposed that legislation should be enacted before the 2015 United Kingdom general election, to forbid credit and debit card operators from processing payments from UK customers to unlicensed websites. This was not done, although the opposition Labour Party expressed support for such legislation. The ASACP described ATVOD's proposed age verification measures as "overbroad" and expressed concern that any consequent legislation could be "overly broad in its definition of adult entertainment content". In November 2014 the Audiovisual Media Services Regulations 2014 amended the Communications Act 2003 to set out statutory and legal obligations for media distributors of on-demand content. The regulations defined the content that can legally be distributed under an R18 certificate and make it a criminal offence to not adequately restrict access to such content to those aged over 18. Further proposals were put forward by the Conservative Party in advance of the 2015 UK general election to give an independent regulator such as ATVOD the legal power to compel internet service providers to block sites which failed to include effective age verification.

== Enforcement ==
In 2012–13 ATVOD took action against 16 services deemed to be in contravention of the regulations. Ten of these made changes to bring them into compliance and three closed voluntarily. One website was shut down by an Ofcom order after ignoring an ATVOD enforcement notice issued against it. Two services run by Playboy TV UK received fines from Ofcom totalling £100,000. Parts of Playboy TV UK's operations were subsequently moved to Canada, from which it continued to provide services to UK consumers without being regulated by ATVOD.

== Consultation and research ==
In 2013 ATVOD conducted a survey into how easy the public thought it was for under-18s to access hardcore pornography on the Internet and whether the public thought that regulation to prevent such access was important. ATVOD subsequently organised a conference for representatives from the UK's adult entertainment industry and children's charities in conjunction with Queen Mary University of London. The conference, entitled For Adults Only? – Protecting Children From Online Porn, met to discuss measures on how to stop young people accessing pornography online. Industry representatives the Association of Sites Advocating Child Protection and the Free Speech Coalition called for a public education campaign instead of blanket censorship, such as ISP blocking, based on the findings of their own report Protecting Children in the Digital Age. Campaign group Sex & Censorship questioned the presumption of the conference, pointing out that there is no evidence that online pornography is harmful and that inappropriate regulation could be counter-productive to child safety.

In 2014 ATVOD published the results of research carried out in December 2013, tracking the actions of 45,000 UK internet users under the age of 18. Of those sampled, 10% of under-18s, 6% of under-16s, and 3% of under-12s who used the Internet during that month had accessed an adult internet service at some point. The definition of an adult website in the survey was broad, including the sex toy and lingerie retailer Ann Summers. Concerns were raised about the small sample size associated with users aged under 12. Nielsen Netview, the marketing agency that carried out the survey, commented that: "The sample size for 6–11 year-olds on the panel is very low. Figures for this age range are still reported, but they are always issued with a 'health warning' as being potentially too unstable to accurately project audience size." ATVOD confirmed that: "Sample sizes for the youngest children (6–11) are relatively small and figures for this age group should be treated with caution as they may exhibit large changes month to month... These demographics do not meet minimum sample size standards."

== Criticism ==
- The AVMSD was criticised by the Confederation of British Industry in 2006 for its potential to stifle the development of VOD in the UK.
- In 2011 ATVOD wrote to several UK newspapers claiming that their websites came under its regulatory ambit despite the fact that the AVMSD expressly excluded electronic versions of newspapers and magazines from its scope.
- Also in 2011 the UK VOD industry expressed concerns over the level of fees charged by ATVOD. The fees were considered to be both disproportionate to the service ATVOD provided and much greater than those charged in the rest of the European Union. As a result, ATVOD consulted over the level of fees in 2013 and introduced concessionary rates for small-scale providers.
- The Open Rights Group criticised the lack of transparency regarding the 2013 talks between ATVOD and financial institutions and consequent recommendations to government, calling for the process come under parliamentary scrutiny.
- There was controversy over ATVOD's process of selecting websites for enforcement action. Itziar Bilbao Urrutia of The Urban Chick Supremacy Cell has said "whenever I see who has been reported to ATVOD, it is usually material that could be classified as kink – especially femdom".

== Legacy ==
Although ATVOD ceased to exist at the end of 2015, attempts to further regulate on-demand services have continued. Provisions regarding the creation of an age-verification regulator and the blocking of non-compliant sites subsequently formed part of the Digital Economy Act 2017. However, the implementation of the proposed UK Internet age verification system was cancelled by the UK government in 2019. In May 2021, the government published the draft Online Safety Bill which applied a duty of care to all "user-to-user services" that allowed one user to encounter the content of another user. Addressing the House of Commons DCMS Select Committee, the Secretary of State, Rt. Hon. Oliver Dowden MP confirmed he would be happy to consider, during pre-legislative scrutiny of the Bill by a joint committee of both Houses of Parliament, a proposal to extend the scope of the duty of care to all commercial pornographic websites. In February 2022 the Digital Economy Minister, Chris Philp, announced that the bill would be amended to bring commercial pornographic websites within its scope.

== See also ==
- Television on demand
- Internet Censorship in the United Kingdom
- Obscene Publications Act 1959
