= John Cooper (barrister) =

British barrister

John Gordon Cooper KC (born 15 September 1958 in Wolverhampton) is a British barrister specialising in human rights and criminal law, and a politician.

== Career ==
Cooper is a member of 25 Bedford Row Chambers in London. He specialises in cases of homicide and serious violence, serious fraud and drug offences. He has also acted in cases such as the Jacintha Saldanha inquest, the Duchess of Cambridge prank call case and represented Nicola Edgington during her murder trial. Cooper also represented Thomas Cashman in his trial for the Murder of Olivia Pratt-Korbel in Liverpool.

In 2012 he successfully acted for Paul Chambers in his appeal over the Twitter Joke Trial, a legal case centred on the conviction of a man who posted a joke on Twitter about destroying an airport.

He represented the majority of bereaved families in the Manchester Arena Inquiry (2020-2022). Other inquiries include representing the Labour Opposition Group, as a result of the Grenfell Tower fire.

He advised the London Mayor Sadiq Khan in relation to the 2018 John Worboys judicial review. Other judicial reviews include the cases of the deaths at Deepcut army barracks, of the government weapons inspector David Kelly and the challenge to the government in relation to the Conservative–DUP agreement.

Cooper advised 43 Labour MPs in relation to the 2019 British prorogation controversy.

He represented Ian Fitzgibbon in the 2023 Ashley Dale murder trial. He also acted for the defence in the so-called Tik Tok murder trial.

Cooper is a member of the Bar of England and Wales, and the Australian Bar. He was appointed honorary professor of law at Cardiff University in 2011.

=== Animal Welfare ===
John Cooper was Chair of the League Against Cruel Sports from 1996-2012 and President from 2012-2015. During his tenure the Labour Government enacted the Hunting Act 2004 which criminalised hunting with hounds. Cooper also advised on the drafting of the Pet Abduction Act 2024 which increased sentences for those convicted of stealing domestic pets.

He advised Queen guitarist Brian May and his Save Me organisation in their action against a badger cull. Cooper is patron of Born Innocent, a campaigning organisation working for the reform of breed specific legislation in relation to dogs.

Cooper represented the International Fund for Animal Welfare on a number of occasions including in the private prosecution of Clarissa Dickson-Wright for attending hare coursing events. He also contributed to The Link Between Animal Abuse and Human Violence.

=== Politics ===
Cooper ran for the House of Commons as a candidate for the Labour Party in the 1987 election in North West Surrey and in the 1992 election in Amber Valley. He was a councillor on Watford Borough Council from 1990 to 1994.
