= Emily Calvin Blake =

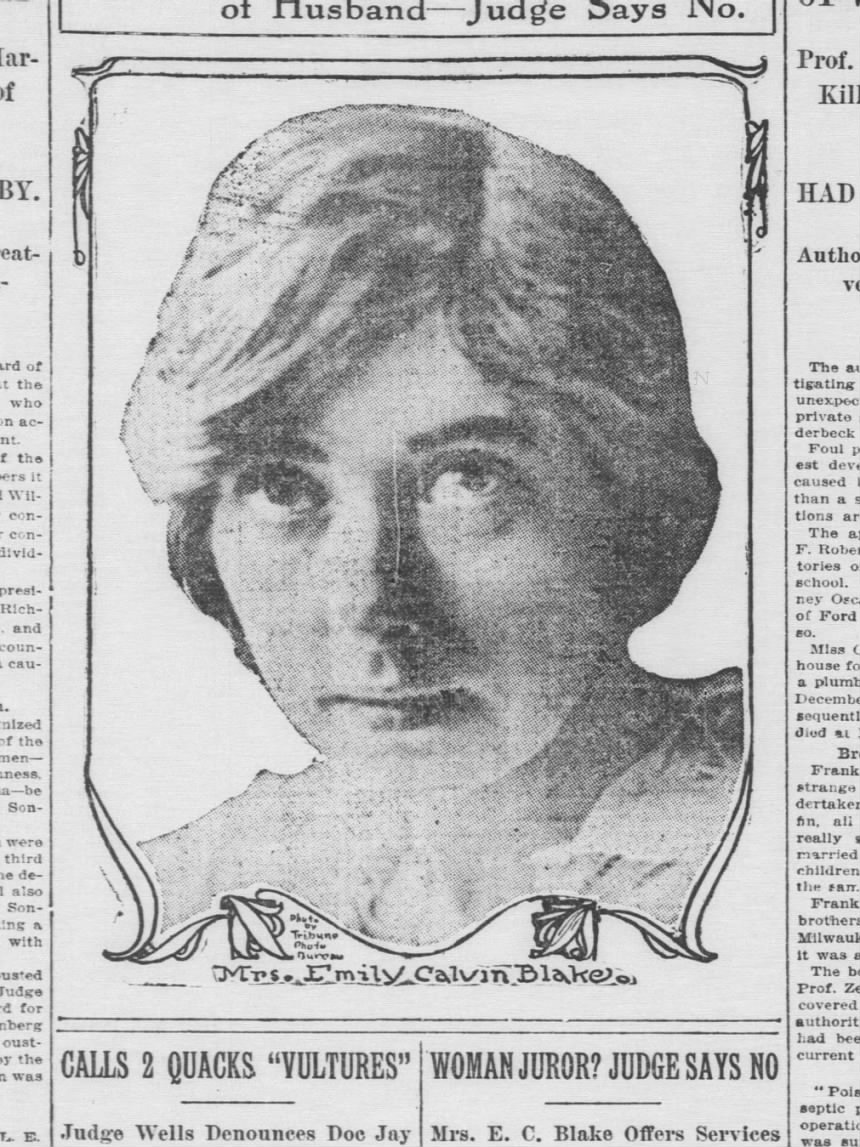
- Born: September 28, 1882; Manchester
- Died: April 29, 1951; Los Angeles
- Occupation: Writer

Emily Calvin Blake (September 28, 1882 – April 29, 1951) was a British-born American writer.

She was born on September 28, 1882, in Manchester, England, the daughter of Thomas Calvin and Margaret Young Calvin. She married Chicagoan Walter R. Blake in 1904 and lived in Chicago most of her life.

Her book of short stories, Engaged Girl's Sketches (1910), earned some contemporary notoriety when it was learned it was purchased by Dorothy Arnold on the day of her disappearance. Her novel The Third Weaver (1929) follows Bohemian heronie Thaisa Worthington. She also published numerous magazine stories, including "Science and the Girl" (Blue Book, January 1909), in which a man suffers an injury similar to that of Phineas Gage and drastically changes his personality, so his daughter's boyfriend, a scientists, attempts to repair the man's brain with "electrified gray matter".

Emily Calvin Blake died on 29 April 1951 in Los Angeles.

== Bibliography ==
- Engaged Girl Sketches. Chicago: Forbes & Company, 1910.
- The Great Moments in a Woman's Life. Chicago: Forbes & Company, 1910.
- Marcia of the Little Home. New York: D. Appleton, 1911.
- Quaintness of Bobby. 1912.
- The Promise. 1913.
- Autobiography of an Impulsive Girl. 1915.
- Suzanna Stirs the Fire. Chicago: A. C. McClurg & Co., 1915.
- The Third Weaver. Chicago: Willett, Clark, & Colby, 1929.
