= Jacqueline Davies =

British judge

- Born: 21 May 1948 (age 78)
- Died: 18 April 2019 (aged 70)
- Occupation: Circuit judge
- Spouse: Paul Clark (?ndash;2008; his death)

Jacqueline Davies (21 May 1948 – 18 April 2019) was a Circuit Judge, working in the North Eastern region of the UK. She was appointed on 29 June 1993.

== Notable Decisions ==
=== Twitter Joke Trial ===
On 11 November 2010 Judge Jacqueline Davies, sitting with two magistrates, refused an appeal against the verdict of the "Twitter Joke Trial", from Paul Chambers who had posted a message on Twitter saying:

Crap! Robin Hood airport is closed. You've got a week and a bit to get your shit together otherwise I'm blowing the airport sky high!!

Chambers was appealing his conviction for "sending a public electronic message that was grossly offensive or of an indecent, obscene or menacing character contrary to the Communications Act 2003" at Doncaster magistrates court

When Judge Davies heard the appeal in Doncaster Crown Court she judged that the tweet was "obviously menacing" and that Chambers must have known that it might be taken seriously. She upheld the £1000 fine, and ordered that he pay an extra £2000 in legal costs.

Many members of Twitter registered their disapproval of the judgement, and Stephen Fry offered to pay the defendant's legal bill.

Judge Davies' decision was reversed on appeal in the High Court by decision dated 27 July 2012. The 13 page judgment by Lord Chief Justice Lord Judge, stated:

We have concluded that, on an objective assessment, the decision of the Crown Court that this 'tweet' constituted or included a message of a menacing character was not open to it. On this basis, the appeal against conviction must be allowed.

== Personal life ==
Judge Davies was married to Judge Paul Clark who died on 7 October 2008

In 2009 Judge Davies took part in a charity walk across the Sinai Desert in memory of her husband and to raise money for Prostate UK and Wellbeing of Women.
