= Ofcom =

British government agency

Coordinates: 51.5079°N 0.0953°W

Office of Communications

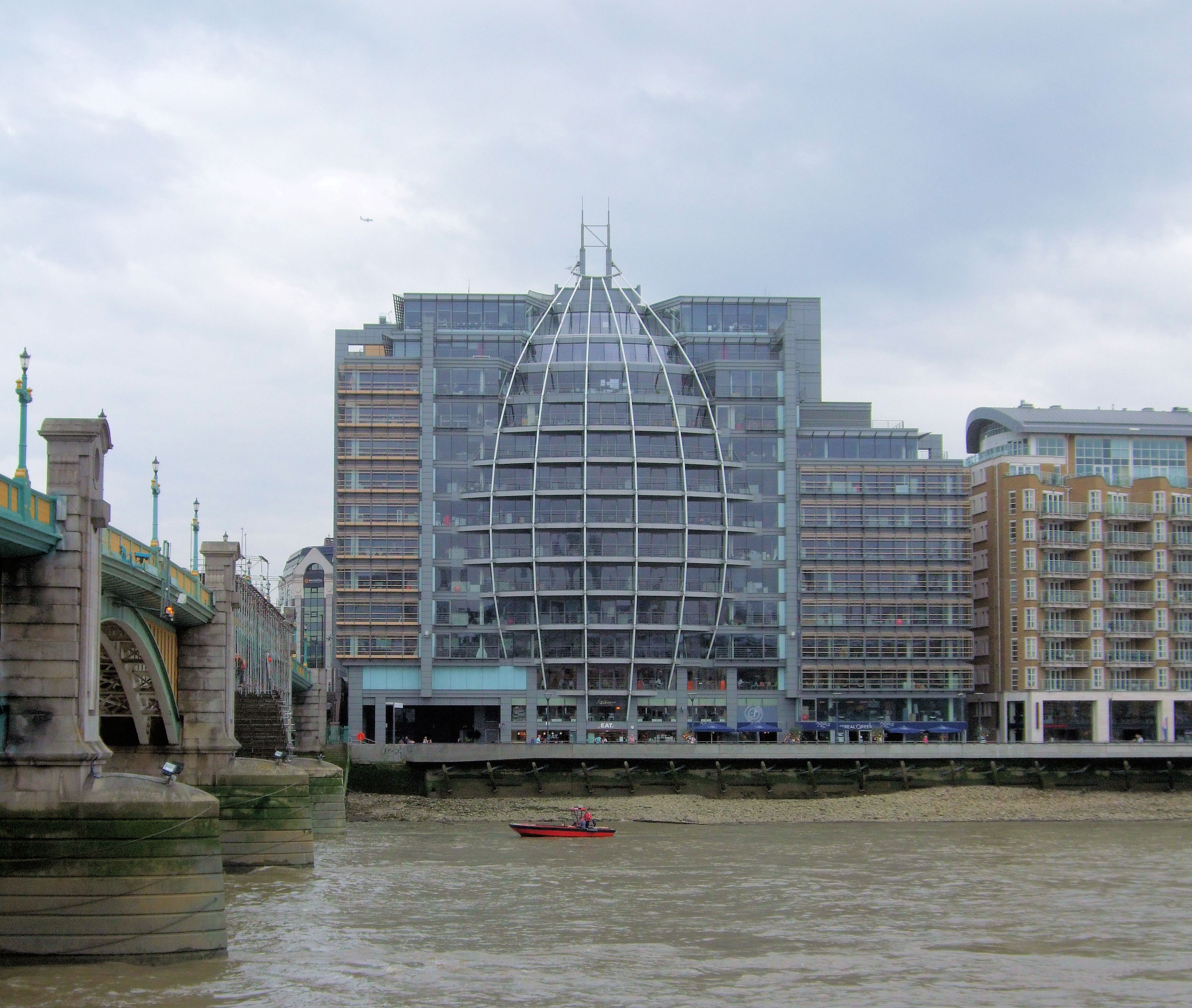
- Ofcom offices at Riverside House, Bankside, next to Southwark Bridge in London
- Abbreviation: Ofcom
- Formation: 29 December 2003; 22 years ago
- Type: Statutory corporation
- Legal status: Created by Office of Communications Act 2002
- Purpose: Regulator and competition authority for broadcasting, internet, postal services, telecommunications and radiocommunications spectrum
- Headquarters: London, England
- Location: London, Edinburgh, Cardiff, Belfast, Manchester, Warrington
- Region served: United Kingdom
- Official language: English, Welsh
- Chairman: Ian Cheshire
- Chief executive: Melanie Dawes
- Main organ: Board of directors
- Staff: 1,557 (full-time equivalents) (2025)
- Website: www.ofcom.org.uk

The Office of Communications (Ofcom) is the government-approved regulatory and competition authority for the broadcasting, internet, telecommunications and postal industries of the United Kingdom.

Ofcom has wide-ranging powers across the television, radio, telecoms, internet and postal sectors. It has a statutory duty to represent the interests of citizens and consumers by promoting competition and protecting the public from harmful or offensive material.

Some of the main areas Ofcom regulates are TV and radio standards, broadband and phones, video-sharing platforms online, the wireless spectrum and postal services.

Office of Communications Act 2002 (Note: Section 7(1).)
- Act of Parliament
- Parliament of the United Kingdom
- Long title: An Act to establish a body corporate to be known as the Office of Communications; and to confer functions in relation to proposals about the regulation of communications on that body, on certain existing regulators and on the Secretary of State.
- Citation: 2002 c. 11
- Territorial extent: United Kingdom (Note: Section 7(3).)

Dates
- Royal assent: 19 March 2002
- Commencement: Various (Note: Section 7(2).)
Other legislation
Amends	House of Commons Disqualification Act 1975
Amended by	Postal Services Act 2011; Scotland Act 2016; Wales Act 2017; Digital Economy Act 2017

Status: Amended

Text of statute as originally enacted

Revised text of statute as amended

The regulator was initially established by the Office of Communications Act 2002 (c. 11) and received its full authority from the Communications Act 2003 (c. 21).

== History ==
Wordmark as of 2004, including the full name

On 20 June 2001, the Queen's Speech to the UK Parliament announced the creation of Ofcom. The new body, which was to replace several existing authorities, was conceived as a "super-regulator" to oversee media channels that were rapidly converging through digital transmission.

On 29 December 2003, Ofcom launched, formally inheriting the duties that had previously been the responsibility of five different regulators:

- the Broadcasting Standards Commission
- the Independent Television Commission
- the Office of Telecommunications (Oftel)
- the Radio Authority
- the Radiocommunications Agency

In 2007, Ofcom was accused of complicity with the mobile telecommunications industry in keeping information about mast locations secret, after they appealed against a Freedom of Information Act ruling with mobile operator T-Mobile, after a Information Tribunal ruled that the public should have access to the Sitefinder database under the Freedom of Information Act 2000. Ofcom were unsuccessful in challenging this decision.

In July 2009, Conservative Party opposition leader David Cameron referenced Ofcom in a speech against the proliferation of quangos:

With a Conservative government, Ofcom as we know it will cease to exist ... Its remit will be restricted to its narrow technical and enforcement roles. It will no longer play a role in making policy. And the policy-making functions it has today will be transferred back fully to the Department for Culture, Media and Sport.

Under Cameron's subsequent premiership of the 2010 UK coalition government, the Public Bodies Act 2011 did remove or modify several of Ofcom's duties, although it did not substantially reduce Ofcom's remit.

On 1 October 2011, Ofcom took over responsibility for regulating the postal services industry from the Postal Services Commission (Postcomm).

In April 2015, Ofcom announced that telephone companies would have to provide customers with a set charge for the cost of calling numbers starting with 084, 087 and 09. The streamlining of these charges must be printed in each customer's contract and monthly bills. The change came into force on 1 July 2015 and affected over 175 million phone numbers, making it the biggest overhaul of telephoning in over a decade.

On 1 January 2016, the regulation of video on demand was transferred to Ofcom from ATVOD, the Authority for Television on Demand.

In 2017, Ofcom's advisory committee for Wales awarded Deryn Consulting a contract to monitor the National Assembly for Wales and Welsh Government. It was subsequently reported that the contract had not been put out to tender and that Huw Roberts and Nerys Evans held positions for both Deryn and Ofcom. The contract was terminated and Ofcom concluded that it had broken its own procurement rules.

The Digital Economy Act 2017 extended Ofcom's remit and powers. Ofcom were given powers concerning the minimum broadband speed provided by Internet service providers, the ability to financially penalise communications providers for failing to comply with licence commitments and the power to require public service broadcasters to include a minimum quantity of children's programming made in the United Kingdom. The act also transferred to Ofcom the regulation of the BBC, a duty previously undertaken by the BBC Trust, and updated the Ofcom Electronic Communications Code to make it easier for telecommunications companies to erect and extend mobile masts.

Ofcom has been criticised since 2003 for incurring unnecessary costs as a result of "extravagant Thames-side offices" and a "top-heavy salary bill". In response to ongoing expenditure concerns, Ofcom confirmed in their 2017/2018 budget that they had delivered 12 years of budget reductions and would continue to lower spending.

Following a consultation over the Online Harms White Paper published by the UK government in April 2019, the government announced in February 2020 that it intended Ofcom to have a greater role in Internet regulation to protect users from "harmful and illegal content".

In July 2022, Ofcom received additional tools to prevent, identify and remove any content that depicts child sexual abuse and exploitation. These tools will be introduced through an amendment to the Online Safety Bill. Ofcom will be allowed to penalise those tech firms that do not comply, either by fines up to £18m or by 10% of the company's annual turnover, whichever amount is higher.

Ofcom has been criticised by some for being too lenient on GB News, who breached Ofcom rules 11 times in the year preceding April 2024. Ofcom declined to levy fines or penalties and instead issued warnings. Ofcom previously stated that GB News can use sitting politicians as presenters on its network. Andrew Neil, the founder of GB News who has since left, has said that Ofcom needs to "grow a backbone and quick” regarding letting politicians host TV programmes. Ofcom has been accused of political bias due to GB News being warned for hosting MPs, whilst other broadcast networks (e.g. LBC and Talk) have hosted MPs but received no such warnings. In February 2025, GB News won a judicial review at the High Court, which found that Ofcom had been insufficiently impartial in its treatment of GB News.

On 1 February 2025, Ofcom took the regulation of Controlled Premium Rate Services (CPRS) back in-house. These services were previously regulated by the Phone-paid Services Authority (PSA) which was disbanded on 31 January 2025 as Ofcom withdrew its formal approval of the former PSA Code of Practice.

== Timeline of communications regulators ==
		Regulators		Dates	
Television	British Broadcasting Corporation (BBC)	BBC Board of Governors		1 January 1927	31 December 2006
Television	British Broadcasting Corporation (BBC)	BBC Trust		1 January 2007	2 April 2017
Television	British Broadcasting Corporation (BBC)	BBC Board (governance)	Office of Communications (Ofcom) (regulation)	3 April 2017	present
Television	Independent Television (ITV)	Independent Television Authority	ITA	4 August 1954	11 July 1972
Television	Independent Television (ITV)	Independent Broadcasting Authority	IBA	12 July 1972	31 December 1990
Television	Independent Television (ITV)	Independent Television Commission	ITC	1 January 1991	28 December 2003
Television	Independent Television (ITV)	Office of Communications	Ofcom	29 December 2003	present
Television	Channel 4	Independent Broadcasting Authority	IBA	2 November 1982	31 December 1990
Television	Channel 4	Independent Television Commission	ITC	1 January 1991	28 December 2003
Television	Channel 4	Office of Communications	Ofcom	29 December 2003	present
Television	Sianel Pedwar Cymru (S4C)	S4C Authority		1 November 1982	28 December 2003
Television	Sianel Pedwar Cymru (S4C)	S4C Authority (governance)	Office of Communications (Ofcom) (regulation)	29 December 2003	22 August 2024
Television	Sianel Pedwar Cymru (S4C)	S4C Board (governance)	Office of Communications (Ofcom) (regulation)	23 August 2024	present
Television	Channel 5	Independent Television Commission	ITC	30 March 1997	28 December 2003
Television	Channel 5	Office of Communications	Ofcom	29 December 2003	present
Radio	Independent Local Radio	Independent Broadcasting Authority	IBA	12 July 1972	31 December 1990
Radio	Independent Local Radio	Radio Authority		1 January 1991	28 December 2003
Radio	Independent Local Radio	Office of Communications	Ofcom	29 December 2003	present
Radio	Spectrum	General Post Office	GPO	1904	1 October 1969
Radio	Spectrum	Ministry of Posts and Telecommunications	MPT*	1 October 1969	1974
Radio	Spectrum	Home Office		1974	1983
Radio	Spectrum	Department of Trade and Industry	DTI	1983	1990
Radio	Spectrum	Radiocommunications Agency		1990	2003
Radio	Spectrum	Office of Communications	Ofcom	29 December 2003	present
Digital Television	Cable Television	Cable Authority		1 December 1984	31 December 1990
Digital Television	Cable Television	Independent Television Commission	ITC	1 January 1991	28 December 2003
Digital Television	Cable Television	Office of Communications	Ofcom	29 December 2003	present
Digital Television	Satellite Television	Independent Broadcasting Authority	IBA	11 December 1986	31 December 1990
Digital Television	Satellite Television	Independent Television Commission	ITC	1 January 1991	28 December 2003
Digital Television	Satellite Television	Office of Communications	Ofcom	29 December 2003	present
Digital Television	Television on Demand	Authority for Television on Demand	ATVOD	18 March 2010	31 December 2015
Digital Television	Television on Demand	Office of Communications	Ofcom	1 January 2016	present
Taste, Decency and Complaints	Complaints	Broadcasting Complaints Commission		1 June 1981	31 March 1997
Taste, Decency and Complaints	Complaints	Broadcasting Standards Commission		1 April 1997	28 December 2003
Taste, Decency and Complaints	Complaints	Office of Communications	Ofcom	29 December 2003	present
Taste, Decency and Complaints	Taste and Decency	Broadcasting Standards Council		16 May 1988	31 March 1997
Taste, Decency and Complaints	Taste and Decency	Broadcasting Standards Commission		1 April 1997	28 December 2003
Taste, Decency and Complaints	Taste and Decency	Office of Communications	Ofcom	29 December 2003	present
Telecommunications	Telecommunications	Office of Telecommunications	Oftel	1 October 1984	28 December 2003
Telecommunications	Telecommunications	Office of Communications	Ofcom	29 December 2003	present
Telecommunications	Controlled Premium Rate Services (CPRS)	Independent Committee for the supervision of Standards of Telephone Information Services	ICSTIS	August 1986	April 2008
Telecommunications	Controlled Premium Rate Services (CPRS)	PhonepayPlus	PPP	April 2008	October 2016
Telecommunications	Controlled Premium Rate Services (CPRS)	Phone-paid Services Authority	PSA	October 2016	31 January 2025
Telecommunications	Controlled Premium Rate Services (CPRS)	Office of Communications	Ofcom	1 February 2025	present
Postal Services	Post	Postal Services Commission	Postcomm	2000	30 September 2011
Postal Services	Post	Office of Communications	Ofcom	1 October 2011	present
Engineering	Transmitters	Independent Television Authority	ITA	4 August 1954	11 July 1972
Engineering	Transmitters	Independent Broadcasting Authority	IBA	12 July 1972	31 December 1990
Engineering	Transmitters	National Transcommunications Limited	NTL	1 January 1991	29 July 2005
Engineering	Transmitters	Arqiva		29 July 2005	present

* Ministry of Posts and Telecommunications

== Activities ==
=== Television and radio ===
Ofcom licences all UK commercial television and radio services in the UK. Broadcasters must comply by the terms of their licence, or risk having it revoked. Ofcom also publishes the Broadcasting Code, a series of rules which all broadcast content on television and radio must follow. The Broadcasting Code requires that content inappropriate for children should not be broadcast between the hours of 5:30 a.m. and 9:00 p.m. Premium-rate film services may broadcast content equivalent to a BBFC 15 certificate at any time of day provided a PIN-protected system is in place to restrict access to those authorised to view it. The broadcasting of pornography with a BBFC R18 certificate is not permitted. In 2010, Ofcom revoked the licences of four free-to-air television channels for promoting adult chat services during daytime hours and transmitting content that was too sexually explicit. The companies involved were fined £157,250. Ofcom's jurisdiction does not cover television and radio channels which are broadcast in the UK but licensed abroad. In 2012, Ofcom lodged a complaint with the Dutch media regulator regarding the content of adult chat television channels which are broadcast in the UK but licensed in the Netherlands. Based on a survey of 200 British respondents, Ofcom published in 2016 a list of about 50 words classified in four grades of offensiveness, from "milder" to "strongest".

=== Telephone and broadband ===
Ofcom regulates the UK telecoms sector, defining and enforcing the conditions by which all mobile and fixed-line phone and broadband companies must abide. These "general conditions" are wide-ranging rules relating to matters such as telephone numbering, emergency services, sales, marketing and interconnection standards. General condition 14.4 requires communications providers to maintain a complaints handling code approved by Ofcom, and general condition 14.7 requires an approved alternative dispute resolution (ADR) scheme to be in place. Ofcom's investigation unit monitors compliance with the conditions and resolves disputes between providers.

Ofcom is also the competition authority for telecoms, enforcing remedies in markets where it believes dominant operators may have a potentially harmful influence on competition or consumers. One of its most high-profile interventions was to require BT to split its wholesale and retail arms into separate companies, bringing about the creation of Openreach which supplies wholesale services to both BT Retail and competing providers.

On 1 July 2015, Ofcom made a number of changes to the way phone calls to UK service numbers would be charged. Under the new legislation, which was promoted by an information campaign entitled UK Calling, call charges must be clearly stated on all materials that advertise a service number. The changes came after research found that callers are often confused about service call charges, and thus can avoid calling these numbers. The July 2015 changes also saw 'freephone numbers' 0800 and 0808 become free to call from both mobiles and landlines.

In March 2016, Ofcom launched an interactive "Mobile coverage and fixed broadband checker", allowing people to check mobile coverage and broadband speeds via their post code.

=== Spectrum licensing and protection ===
Ofcom is responsible for the management, regulation, assignment and licensing of the electromagnetic spectrum in the UK, and licences portions of it for use in television and radio broadcasts, mobile phone transmissions, private communications networks, wireless devices and so on. The process of licensing varies depending on the type of use required. Some licences simply have to be applied and paid for; other commercial licences are subject to a bidding process. Most of the procedures in place have been inherited from the systems used by the previous regulators. However, Ofcom may change some of these processes in future.

Ofcom protects the radio spectrum in a number of ways:

- Working within international organisations (ITU, CEPT and BEREC).
- Licensing UK-controlled commercial radio spectrum; the Ministry of Defence controls its own spectrum. Within the international framework for frequency use; Ofcom liaises through the UK Government to produce the UKFAT (UK Frequency Allocation Table). The current table was produced in 2017.
- Investigate and, when necessary, carry out enforcement activities to clear interference or illegal use from the spectrum. Until June 2010 Ofcom investigated all interference cases within the UK. Interference reporting has now been transferred to the BBC. This contract specifically excludes any requirement to investigate interference relating to AM radio reception. Commercial and spectrum licence holders report to Ofcom and in all cases illegal ("pirate") radio operations are still reported to Ofcom.

=== Postal services ===
In October 2010 the government announced plans for Ofcom to inherit the functions of Postcomm as part of a wider set of public service sell-off measures. Following the Postal Services Act 2011 regulatory responsibility for postal services transferred to Ofcom on 1 October 2011, with its primary duty to maintain the UK's six-day-a-week universal postal service.

=== Consultations ===
Ofcom makes extensive use of consultations with industry and the public to help it make decisions based upon the evidence presented. Consultation processes begin with publishing documents on its website, asking for views and responses. If the document is perceived to be long and complicated, a plain English summary is usually published as well. A period, usually of 10 weeks, is allowed for interested persons, companies or organisations to send in their responses to the consultation.

After this consultation period, Ofcom publishes all the responses on its website, excluding any personal or confidential information. Ofcom then prepares a summary of the responses received, and uses this information as a basis for its decisions.

== Investigations and rulings ==
=== Press TV ===
In May 2011, Ofcom ruled that Press TV, an Iranian English-language satellite channel, was responsible for a serious breach of UK broadcasting rules and could face a fine for airing an interview with Maziar Bahari, the Newsweek journalist arrested covering the Iranian presidential election in 2009, that was obtained by force while he was held in a Tehran jail. Press TV said that Bahari did not "dispute the truth and accuracy" of the extract of the interview, so it made "no logical sense" to require his consent.

=== News International phone hacking scandal ===
In July 2011, in the wake of the News International phone hacking scandal, Ofcom came under pressure to launch an inquiry into whether the parent company of News International, News Corporation, was still the "fit and proper" owner of a controlling stake in the satellite broadcasting company British Sky Broadcasting (BSkyB). On 13 July former Prime Minister Gordon Brown urged Ofcom to launch an investigation. On 15 July the Deputy Prime Minister Nick Clegg stated that the Government would launch a review of laws on what constituted a "fit and proper" owner for broadcasting companies in the United Kingdom, and that anyone found not to meet that standard can be forced to give up their current holdings in a company.

On 22 July 2011, it was reported that Ofcom had begun an investigation into whether the phone-hacking scandal may have changed BSkyB's status as the "fit and proper" holder of a UK broadcasting licence. On the same day Ed Richards, the then chief executive of Ofcom, replied to Simon Hughes MP, Don Foster MP and Tim Farron MP following a letter which they had written to him on 8 July concerning News Corporation's shareholding in BSkyB. In the letter Richards confirmed that Ofcom considers that News Corporation's current shareholding of 39.14% in BSkyB does give it a material influence over the company; that Ofcom is not precluded from acting by ongoing police investigations; and that Ofcom's process is not dependent upon a criminal conviction being secured.

In April 2012, Ofcom's probe moved from a monitoring phase to an "evidence gathering" phase.

=== Al Jazeera ===
The Qatar-based news media outlet was reported to Ofcom in January 2017, following an exposé about Israeli diplomatic corps irregularities and influence peddling amongst political and student groups in the UK. After investigations exceeding eight months, Ofcom reported that Al Jazeera was in line with journalism standards and cleared the filmmakers of the allegations.

=== Abu Dhabi TV ===
Abu Dhabi TV, owned by the Abu Dhabi Media state enterprise, was condemned by Ofcom in a 9 November 2020 adjudication for broadcasting a televised interview of the confessions made by a Qatari citizen, Dr. Mahmoud Al-Jaida, while he was detained arbitrarily in the Abu Dhabi prisons in 2013. The National Human Rights Committee of the State of Qatar welcomed Ofcom's decision. Under the decision, it was stated that on 28 June 2017, the Abu Dhabi TV channel, which is affiliated with Abu Dhabi Media Company P.J.S.C "ADMC", licensed under Ofcom had broadcast an interview recording titled "Mahmoud Al-Jaidah and the clandestine organization in UAE". According to the decision, the aired interview was recorded against the consent of Dr. Al-Jaidah, who was physically tortured during his time in the Abu Dhabi prison. The activity had constituted a serious breach of the principles of fairness and privacy detailed in the Ofcom Broadcasting Code.

=== CGTN ===
In 2019, Ofcom began an investigation into the Chinese international channel CGTN, owned by state broadcaster China Central Television (CCTV), following allegations that a forced confession from British former journalist Peter Humphrey was broadcast on the channel. In addition, it also received four formal complaints over similar alleged confessions. In November, Hong Kong activist and former UK consulate worker Simon Cheng filed a complaint to Ofcom a week after CGTN released a video of him admitting to "soliciting prostitution", which Cheng said he was forced to make.

In early 2021, Ofcom revoked the UK broadcasting licence of CGTN. In a statement, it noted that the licence holder for the channel, Star China Media Ltd., did not have editorial responsibility over the channel, which was against legal requirements. It was also unable to hand over the licence to a corporation called "China Global Television Network Corporation" (CGTNC), on the grounds that the company was "ultimately controlled by the Chinese Communist Party, which is not permitted under UK broadcasting law". Ofcom later fined CGTN £225,000 for "breaching rules on fairness, privacy and due impartiality".

Following the revocation, both the Chinese government and state media began targeting the BBC, accusing it of producing "fake news" in its coverage of the COVID-19 pandemic in mainland China and the Xinjiang re-education camps. CGTN itself claimed that Ofcom was "manipulated by extreme right-wing organizations and anti-China forces".

=== BBC's Gaza documentary ===
In 2025, an Ofcom investigation concluded that the BBC documentary Gaza: How to Survive a Warzone was "materially misleading" and that the BBC had breached broadcasting rules by failing to disclose that the narrator, a 13-year-old boy, was the son of an official of Hamas, a proscribed terrorist organisation in the UK. While the BBC had already removed the documentary from its BBC iPlayer, Ofcom instructed the BBC to broadcast an apology, marking the first time since 2009 that BBC had been sanctioned by Ofcom and ordered to issue an on-air apology. A BBC spokesperson confirmed that BBC fully accepted Ofcom's ruling and would comply with the sanction.

=== Sexual deepfake generation on X ===
On 6 January 2026, Ofcom announced that it had contacted X over the issue of generation of fake intimate images of women and images of child sexual abuse. They said "Tackling illegal online harm and protecting children remain urgent priorities for Ofcom," and "We are aware of serious concerns raised about a feature on Grok on X that produces undressed images of people and sexualised images of children."

Ofcom said that they had made "urgent contact with X and xAI to understand what steps they have taken to comply with their legal duties to protect users in the UK". Ofcom said that depending on the reply they got, they would "determine whether there are potential compliance issues that warrant investigation". Grok said on 3 January 2026, that they identified flaws in the tool which they said were "lapses in safeguards" and that they were working "urgently" to fix them. Elon Musk responded to images of public figures edited to show them in bikinis with "laughing-so-hard-I'm-crying" emojis.

On 12 January 2026, Ofcom announced an investigation into X over compaints about deepfake sexual images. Ofcom said "There have been deeply concerning reports of the Grok AI chatbot account on X being used to create and share undressed images of people – which may amount to intimate image abuse or pornography – and sexualised images of children that may amount to child sexual abuse material." and "As the UK's independent online safety watchdog, we urgently made contact with X on Monday, 5 January and set a firm deadline of Friday, 9 January for it to explain what steps it has taken to comply with its duties to protect its users in the UK,". They added "The company responded by the deadline, and we carried out an expedited assessment of available evidence as a matter of urgency. We have decided to open a formal investigation to establish whether X has failed to comply with its legal obligations under the Online Safety Act.".

xAI has said they will limit image generation and editing to paying customers as well as addressing users generating sexualised images of others. If Ofcom finds that xAI has broken the law, xAI can be made to comply with the law and if xAI refuses to comply, they can be fined 10% of relevant global revenues.

== Leadership ==
=== Current ===
Michael Grade, Baron Grade of Yarmouth was appointed as chairman of Ofcom for a four-year term from 1 May 2022. The appointment was criticised by Jean Seaton, according to The Guardian. She called it a means of "bullying" the BBC. Melanie Dawes was appointed chief executive on 12 February 2020.

As of July 2025, Ofcom's leadership includes:

- Chief executive, Melanie Dawes, appointed March 2020
- Board members
  - Tamara Ingram, deputy chair, appointed December 2024
  - Richard Allan, Baron Allan of Hallam, appointed November 2024
  - Karen Baxter, appointed March 2022
  - Angela Dean, appointed September 2018
  - Bob Downes, appointed February 2018
  - Ben Verwaayen, appointed September 2018
  - Will Harding, appointed October 2022
  - Sir Clive Jones, appointed February 2024
  - Natalie Black, appointed November 2024

Ofcom publishes a register of disclosable interests of the Ofcom board.

=== Historical ===
The first chairman of Ofcom (2002–2009) was David Currie, Baron Currie of Marylebone, Dean of Cass Business School at City University. The first chief executive (2003–2007) was Stephen Carter, Baron Carter of Barnes, formerly a senior executive of JWT UK and NTL and subsequently a Minister for Communications, Technology and Broadcasting.

Colette Bowe was appointed Ofcom chairman with effect from 11 March 2009. She was the founding chairman of the Telecoms Ombudsman Council, and chaired Ofcom's Consumer Panel from its inception in 2003 to December 2007.

Dame Patricia Hodgson was appointed as chairman of Ofcom for a three-year term from April 2014. She was a member of the Ofcom board from July 2011 and became deputy chairman in January 2012. On 18 July 2016, it was announced that her term would be extended for a further year until 2018.

Sharon White was Ofcom's chief executive from 2015 to 2019, having replaced Ed Richards in the role.

After Sharon White was appointed the chief executive of John Lewis in June 2019, the office of chief executive remained open until Jonathan Oxley was appointed as interim chief executive. In February 2020, it was announced that Melanie Dawes would become the new chief executive.

On 15 March 2016, it was announced that Steve Gettings would become corporation secretary in succession to Graham Howell.

=== List of chairs of Ofcom ===
No.	Portrait	Name	Term of office		Honour(s)	Prime Minister	Monarch (reign)
1		David Currie, Baron Currie of Marylebone	29 December 2003	11 March 2009		Tony Blair	Elizabeth II (1952–2022)
1		David Currie, Baron Currie of Marylebone	29 December 2003	11 March 2009		Gordon Brown	Elizabeth II (1952–2022)
2		Colette Bowe	11 March 2009	31 March 2014		Gordon Brown	Elizabeth II (1952–2022)
2		Colette Bowe	11 March 2009	31 March 2014		David Cameron	Elizabeth II (1952–2022)
3		Patricia Hodgson	1 April 2014	31 December 2017		David Cameron	Elizabeth II (1952–2022)
3		Patricia Hodgson	1 April 2014	31 December 2017		Theresa May	Elizabeth II (1952–2022)
4		Terence Burns, Baron Burns	1 January 2018	31 December 2020		Theresa May	Elizabeth II (1952–2022)
4		Terence Burns, Baron Burns	1 January 2018	31 December 2020		Boris Johnson	Elizabeth II (1952–2022)
–		Maggie Carver (acting chairman)	1 January 2021	30 April 2022		Boris Johnson	Elizabeth II (1952–2022)
5		Michael Grade, Baron Grade of Yarmouth	1 May 2022	30 April 2026		Boris Johnson	Elizabeth II (1952–2022)
5		Michael Grade, Baron Grade of Yarmouth	1 May 2022	30 April 2026		Liz Truss	Elizabeth II (1952–2022)
5		Michael Grade, Baron Grade of Yarmouth	1 May 2022	30 April 2026		Liz Truss	Charles III (2022–present)
5		Michael Grade, Baron Grade of Yarmouth	1 May 2022	30 April 2026		Rishi Sunak	Charles III (2022–present)
5		Michael Grade, Baron Grade of Yarmouth	1 May 2022	30 April 2026		Keir Starmer	Charles III (2022–present)
6		Sir Ian Cheshire	1 May 2026	Incumbent		Keir Starmer	Charles III (2022–present)
6		Sir Ian Cheshire	1 May 2026	Incumbent		Keir Starmer	Charles III (2022–present)
6		Sir Ian Cheshire	1 May 2026	Incumbent		Andy Burnham	Charles III (2022–present)

=== List of chief executive officers of Ofcom ===
- 29 December 2003 – 31 July 2006: Stephen Carter
- 1 August 2006 – 5 October 2006: chairman of Ofcom (Acting)
- 5 October 2006 – 31 December 2014: Ed Richards
- 1 January 2015 – 23 March 2015: Steve Unger (Acting)
- 23 March 2015 – 27 November 2019: Sharon White
- 27 November 2019 – March 2020: Jonathan Oxley (Acting)
- March 2020 – present: Melanie Dawes

== Ofcom committees ==
Ofcom has a number of committees and advisory bodies which inform the Ofcom board and executive. These include:

- Communications Consumer Panel (CCP)
- Advisory Committee for Older and Disabled People (ACOD)
- Risk and Audit Committee
- Nominations Committee
- Remuneration Committee
- Election Committee
- Non-Executive Remuneration Committee
- Nations Committee
- Advisory Committee for England
- Advisory Committee for Northern Ireland
- Advisory Committee for Scotland
- Advisory Committee for Wales
- Community Radio Fund Panel
- Ofcom Spectrum Advisory Board (OSAB)
- Broadcast Licensing Committee

Ofcom is also involved in a number of other independent organisations including being an observer member of NICC Standards Ltd.

== UK hate speech regulation ==
Since 1 January 2021, Ofcom has defined hate speech as "all forms of expression which spread, incite, promote or justify hatred based on intolerance on the grounds of disability, ethnicity, social origin, sex, gender, gender reassignment, nationality, race, religion or belief, sexual orientation, colour, genetic features, language, political or any other opinion, membership of a national minority, property, birth or age." However, there is concern that Ofcom's broad definition of hate speech can easily result in the unjustified censorship of controversial opinions, however legitimate they might be.

== See also ==
- Advertising Standards Authority
- Annan Committee, that in 1977 recommended the establishment of a Broadcasting Complaints Commission
- Broadband stakeholder group
- IPSO (Independent Press Standards Organisation)
- ATVOD
- ITSPA
- ISPA
- Commonwealth Telecommunications Organisation (CTO)
- International Telecommunication Union
- List of telecommunications regulatory bodies

== Notes ==
Communications regulation
Preceded by BBC Trust	Regulation of the BBC; 3 April 2017–present	Incumbent
Preceded by Independent Television Commission	Regulation of ITV; 29 December 2003–present	Incumbent
Preceded by Independent Television Commission	Regulation of Channel 4; 29 December 2003–present	Incumbent
Preceded by Independent Television Commission	Regulation of Channel 5; 29 December 2003–present	Incumbent
Preceded by Independent Television Commission	Regulation of Satellite Television; 29 December 2003–present	Incumbent
Preceded by Independent Television Commission	Regulation of Cable Television; 29 December 2003–present	Incumbent
Preceded by Radio Authority	Regulation of Independent Local Radio; 29 December 2003–present	Incumbent
Preceded by Radiocommunications Agency	Regulation of use of the Radio Spectrum; 29 December 2003–present	Incumbent
Preceded by Broadcasting Standards Commission	Monitoring of 'Taste and Decency'; 29 December 2003–present	Incumbent
Preceded by Office of Telecommunications	Monitoring of Telecommunications; 29 December 2003–present	Incumbent
Preceded by Postal Services Commission	Regulation of the Postal Services; 1 October 2011–present	Incumbent
