= Paul Clark (judge) =

British judge (1940–2008)

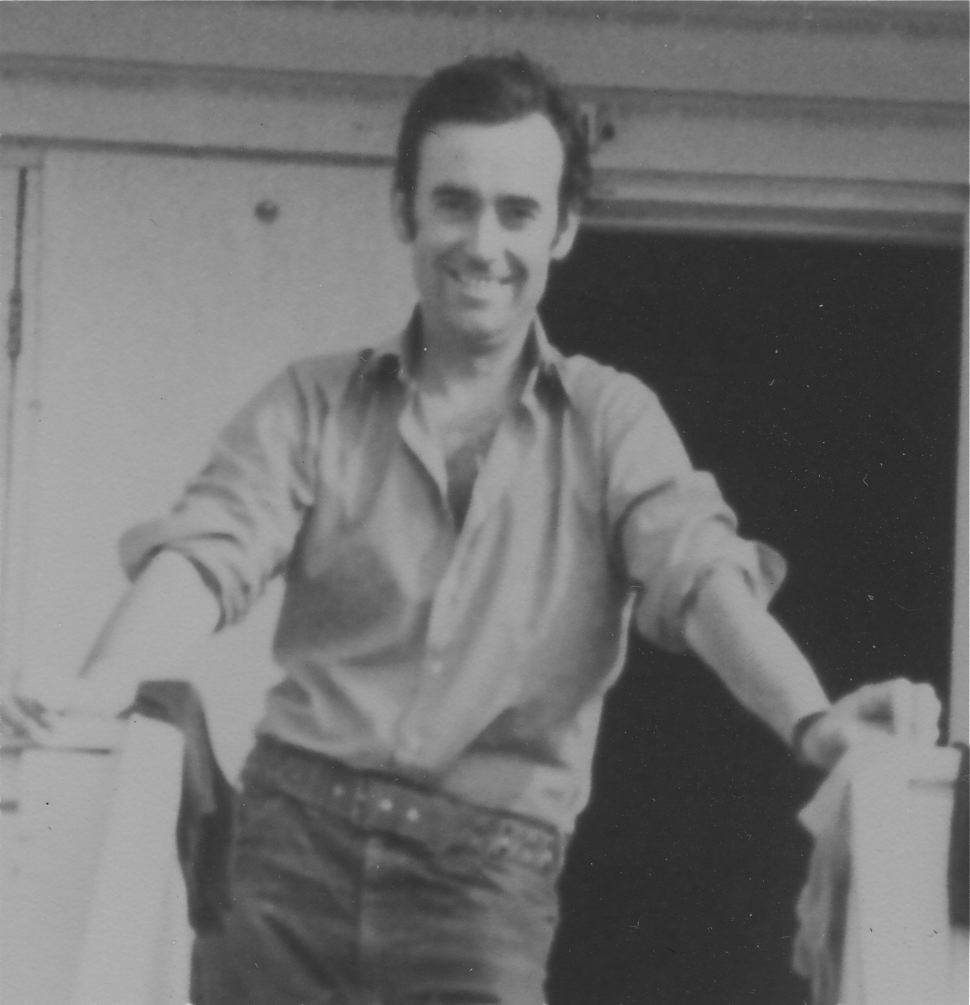
Paul Nicholas Rowntree Clark

Paul Nicholas Rowntree Clark (17 August 1940 – 6 October 2008) was a British circuit judge in the Courts of England and Wales.

He was educated at Bristol Grammar School, New College, Oxford, where he was an open scholar, and Middle Temple, where he was Harmsworth Scholar. Called to the Bar in 1966, he practised principally on the Midland and Oxford Circuit, where he became a circuit judge in 1985, having been a recorder from 1981-85.

He was President of the Council of Circuit Judges. He was elected the youngest Bencher of the Middle Temple in 1982 and was Master Reader in 2005. He was also Chairman of the Middle Temple Scholarship Committee, a role which he used to help numerous people gain a foothold in the profession. In Oxford he was chairman of the university’s disciplinary committee and chairman of the Friends of the Ashmolean Museum.

A memorial service was held at New College, Oxford on Saturday 10 January 2009 at 2.30pm.
