= Postal Services Commission =

Dissolved UK regulatory agency

Postal Services Commission (Welsh: Comisiwn Gwasanaethau Post)

Non-ministerial government department overview
- Formed: 2000
- Dissolved: 2011
- Superseding Non-ministerial government department: Ofcom
- Jurisdiction: United Kingdom
- Headquarters: Hercules House, 6 Hercules Road, London, SE1 7DB
- Employees: 55
- Annual budget: £8 million (2009-2010)
- Non-ministerial government department executive: Tim Brown, Chief Executive
- Website: www.psc.gov.uk

The Postal Services Commission, known as Postcomm, was a non-ministerial department of the Government of the United Kingdom charged with overseeing the quality and universal service of post in the United Kingdom. It was established in 2000 under the Postal Services Act 2000. Postcomm was merged into the communications regulator Ofcom on 1 October 2011.

Most of Postcomm's role involved regulating Royal Mail (for letter delivery and to guarantee a universal postal service) and its two subsidiaries, Post Office Ltd and Parcelforce. Postcomm was also charged with the licensing of the UK's postal operators. It was set up alongside a 'sister' organisation, Postwatch, an independent watchdog for postal services. Postwatch became part of Consumer Focus on 1 October 2008.

In May 2008, Postcomm called for the part-privatisation of Royal Mail to safeguard the universal service. Following the Hooper Report into the future of the postal services industry, in October 2010, Business Secretary Vince Cable confirmed plans for the privatisation of up to 90% of the business and the possible mutualisation of the Post Office. Any purchasing business will be required to retain the universal service of collection and delivery of mail six days a week at affordable prices. Royal Mail staff are to be offered the remaining 10% shares with the Government to take on the group's pension liabilities. The changes were enabled by the Postal Services Act 2011. As part of the plans, the roles fulfilled by Postcomm were absorbed into the communications regulator Ofcom from 1 October 2011.

== Statutory basis ==
The authority for Postcomm was found in the Postal Services Act 2000, s.1 and Sch.1.

1 The Postal Services Commission

(1) There shall be a body corporate to be known as the Postal Services Commission (in this Act referred to as "the Commission").

(2) The functions of the Commission shall be performed on behalf of the Crown.

(3) Schedule 1 (which makes further provision about the Commission) shall have effect.

(4) The body which, immediately before the coming into force of this subsection, was known as the Postal Services Commission and was designated in accordance with Article 22 of the Postal Services Directive as a national regulatory authority for the postal sector in the United Kingdom is hereby abolished.
