= Communications Act 2003 =

Act of the Parliament of the United Kingdom

Communications Act 2003 (Note: Section 411(1).)
- Act of Parliament
- Parliament of the United Kingdom
- Long title: An Act to confer functions on the Office of Communications; to make provision about the regulation of the provision of electronic communications networks and services and of the use of the electro-magnetic spectrum; to make provision about the regulation of broadcasting and of the provision of television and radio services; to make provision about mergers involving newspaper and other media enterprises and, in that connection, to amend the Enterprise Act 2002; and for connected purposes.
- Citation: 2003 c. 21
- Introduced by: Tessa Jowell MP, Secretary of State for Culture, Media and Sport (Commons); Lord McIntosh of Haringey (Lords)
- Territorial extent: England and Wales; Scotland; Northern Ireland (Note: Section 411(5).)

Dates
- Royal assent: 17 July 2003
- Commencement: Various (Note: Section 411(2).)
Other legislation
Amends	Continental Shelf Act 1964; Marine, &c., Broadcasting (Offences) Act 1967; House of Commons Disqualification Act 1975; Cinemas Act 1985; Surrogacy Arrangements Act 1985; Airports Act 1986; Company Directors Disqualification Act 1986; Channel Tunnel Act 1987; Malicious Communications Act 1988; Legal Aid Act 1988; Town and Country Planning Act 1990; Planning (Listed Buildings and Conservation Areas) Act 1990; Planning (Consequential Provisions) Act 1990; Courts and Legal Services Act 1990; Broadcasting Act 1990; Water Industry Act 1991; Water Resources Act 1991; Land Drainage Act 1991; Judicial Pensions and Retirement Act 1993; Value Added Tax Act 1994; Deregulation and Contracting Out Act 1994; Criminal Procedure (Scotland) Act 1995; Criminal Procedure (Consequential Provisions) (Scotland) Act 1995; Arbitration Act 1996; Petroleum Act 1998; Television Licences (Disclosure of Information) Act 2000; Countryside and Rights of Way Act 2000; Political Parties, Elections and Referendums Act 2000; Anti-terrorism, Crime and Security Act 2001
Amended by	Wireless Telegraphy Act 2006; Digital Economy Act 2010; Postal Services Act 2011; Scrap Metal Dealers Act 2013; Criminal Justice and Courts Act 2015; Investigatory Powers Act 2016; Digital Economy Act 2017; Telecommunications (Security) Act 2021; Online Safety Act 2023; Digital Markets, Competition and Consumers Act 2024; Tobacco and Vapes Act 2026

Status: Amended

Text of statute as originally enacted

Revised text of statute as amended

The Communications Act 2003 (c. 21) is an act of the Parliament of the United Kingdom. The act, which came into force on 25 July 2003, superseded the Telecommunications Act 1984. The new act was the responsibility of Culture Secretary Tessa Jowell. It consolidated the telecommunication and broadcasting regulators in the UK, introducing the Office of Communications (Ofcom) as the new industry regulator. On 28 December 2003 Ofcom gained its full regulatory powers, inheriting the duties of the Office of Telecommunications (Oftel). Among other measures, the act introduced legal recognition of community radio and paved the way for full-time community radio services in the UK, as well as controversially lifting many restrictions on cross-media ownership. It also made it illegal to use other people's Wi-Fi broadband connections without their permission. In addition, the legislation also allowed for the first time non-European entities to wholly own a British television company.

== Provisions of the act ==
The act has a large number of provisions, including the following:

- Dishonestly obtaining access to the Internet with no intention to pay for the service was made a criminal offence.
- Sending a malicious communication using social media was made a criminal offence.
- The Independent Television Commission, Radio Authority, Office of Telecommunications, and Radiocommunications Agency were merged into Ofcom.
- The telecommunications licensing regime was replaced by a general authorisation for companies to provide telecommunications services subject to general conditions of entitlement, while BT retained its universal service obligation.
- It was declared an offence to "persistently make use of a public electronic communications network for the purpose of causing annoyance, inconvenience or needless anxiety". Ofcom subsequently developed policies to reduce the number of silent telephone calls.
- Sections 78 to 93 concern OFCOM's powers and duties in markets where one or more business is able to exercise "significant market power" (SMP).
- The public service remit for Channel 4 was revised.
- Broadcasters were required to make a proportion of television programmes outside the London area (defined as outside the M25).
- Restrictions on ITV company ownership were lifted, aside from "public interest" test that was added as an amendment in the House of Lords. The result was the formation of a single entity ITV plc controlling all of the ITV franchises in England and Wales in February 2004.
- The limit on the proportion of ITN that any ITV operating company could own was abolished.
- Broadcasters were required to carry a "suitable quantity and range of programmes" dealing with religion and other beliefs, as part of their public service broadcasting.
- Political advertising on television or radio was prohibited.
- Ofcom given the responsibility to 'promote' media literacy.
- The Gaelic Media Service (now MG ALBA) was created "to secure that a wide and diverse range of high quality programmes in Gaelic are broadcast or otherwise transmitted so as to be available to persons in Scotland".
- Community radio stations were recognised as a distinct third tier of radio alongside BBC Radio and commercial radio.
- The authority for the BBC to collect the licence fee was set out.
- Provision was made for the requirements for blind and deaf television viewers. This has subsequently included sign language, subtitles and audio description.
- The Broadcast Committee of Advertising Practice was established as the regulatory body ensuring that advertising on radio and television is not misleading, harmful, offensive, or beyond the boundaries of taste and decency.

== Wi-Fi ==
It is an offence under section 125 of the act to obtain access to the Internet when there is no intention to pay for that service. The legislation was intended to prevent the major defrauding of communications companies. Nevertheless, the individual practice of piggybacking (the illicit use of a Wi-Fi connection to access another subscriber's Internet service) was demonstrated to be a contravention of the act by R v Straszkiewicz in 2005. There have been subsequent arrests for the practice. Piggybacking may also be a breach of the Computer Misuse Act 1990. Section 125 of the act has been criticised for its vagueness, resulting in the possibility that many users of portable Wi-Fi enabled devices are inadvertently breaching it.

== Malicious communications ==
Section 127 (1) of the act makes it an offence to send a message that is grossly offensive or of an indecent, obscene or menacing character over a public electronic communications network. The section replaced section 43 of the Telecommunications Act 1984 and is drafted as widely as its predecessor. The section has been used controversially to prosecute users of social media in cases such as the Twitter Joke Trial and Facebook comments concerning the murder of April Jones. Section 127 is a summary offence, so it is tried in a magistrates court with no right to jury trial.

On 19 December 2012, to strike a balance between freedom of speech and criminality, the Director of Public Prosecutions issued interim guidelines, clarifying when social messaging is eligible for criminal prosecution under UK law. Only communications that are credible threats of violence, harassment, or stalking (such as aggressive Internet trolling) which specifically targets an individual or individuals or breaches a court order designed to protect someone (such as those protecting the identity of a victim of a sexual offence) will be prosecuted. Communications that express an "unpopular or unfashionable opinion about serious or trivial matters, or banter or humour, even if distasteful to some and painful to those subjected to it" will not. Communications that are merely "grossly offensive, indecent, obscene or false" will be prosecuted only when it can be shown to be necessary and proportionate. People who pass on malicious messages, such as by retweeting, can also be prosecuted when the original message is subject to prosecution. Individuals who post messages as part of a separate crime, such as a plan to import drugs, would face prosecution for that offence, as is currently the case.

Revisions to the interim guidelines were issued on 20 June 2013 following a public consultation. The revisions specified that prosecutors should consider:

- whether messages were aggravated by references to race, religion or other minorities, and whether they breached existing rules to counter harassment or stalking; and
- the age and maturity of any wrongdoer should be taken into account and given great weight.

The revisions also clarified that criminal prosecutions were "unlikely":

- when the author of the message had "expressed genuine remorse";
- when "swift and effective action ... to remove the communication" was taken; or
- when messages were not intended for a wide audience.

More recently, Section 127 has been used to prosecute those alleged to have sent grossly offensive messages on a public electronic communications network, such as WhatsApp, but which were not visible to an audience beyond the intended recipients. In 2022, a serving police officer and a former constable each received 12-week prison sentences for sending racist, misogynistic, ableist, and homophobic messages to a WhatsApp group. The group was uncovered as convicted murderer, and former police officer, Wayne Couzens had been a member. Six more former police officers, retired at the time of the offensive communications, pleaded guilty to a similar but unrelated WhatsApp group in September 2023. Such prosecutions are not without controversy since they treat encrypted messages, by their nature only visible to intended recipients, as public because they are sent using publicly available instant messaging platforms, rather than because the individual messages themselves are visible to the public. Andrew Tettenborn, a British legal academic, has argued that this criminalises speech which would not be illegal if spoken aloud in private conversation.

The Law Commission, a public body which reviews and recommends changes to the law, recommended that Section 127 be replaced with new offences that are more targeted in their approach. This was intended to update legislation passed prior to the widespread use of instant messaging and to reduce concerns about limits on the freedom of expression. Though Online Safety Act 2023 adopted some of these proposals by repealing Section 127(2) and replacing it with two new offences: threatening communication and false communication, Section 127(1) pertaining to grossly offensive messages remains in force.

== Amendments to the act ==
- Regulations amended the act in 2009 and 2010, making Ofcom the co-regulator for video on demand in the UK, along with ATVOD and the Advertising Standards Authority.
- The Digital Economy Act 2010 amended the Communications Act 2003, giving Ofcom the responsibility of enforcing regulations concerning Internet copyright breaches.
- The Postal Services Act 2011 allowed Ofcom to take over regulatory responsibility for the Royal Mail from the Postal Services Commission.
- The Audiovisual Media Services Regulations 2014 amended the Communications Act 2003 to set out statutory and legal obligations for media distributors of on-demand content. The regulations define the content that can legally be distributed under an R18 certificate and make it a criminal offence to not adequately restrict access to such content to those aged over 18.
- The Criminal Justice and Courts Act 2015 extended the time limits for bringing a prosecution under section 127.

Broadcasting (Radio Multiplex Services) Act 2017
- Act of Parliament
- Parliament of the United Kingdom
- Long title: An Act to make provision about the regulation of small-scale radio multiplex services; and for connected purposes.
- Citation: 2017 c. 12
- Introduced by: Kevin Foster MP (Commons); Baroness Bloomfield of Hinton Waldrist (Lords)

Dates
- Royal assent: 27 April 2017

Status: Current legislation

History of passage through Parliament

Text of the Broadcasting (Radio Multiplex Services) Act 2017 as in force today (including any amendments) within the United Kingdom, from legislation.gov.uk.

- The Broadcasting (Radio Multiplex Services) Act 2017 (c. 12) allowed local digital radio networks. A consultation on the licensing scheme under the amendments was implemented in 2018. Starting in 2018, as of 2025, seven rounds of licensing rounds were held.
  Telecommunications Infrastructure (Leasehold Property) Act 2021
  - Act of Parliament
  - Parliament of the United Kingdom
  - Long title: An Act to amend the electronic communications code set out in Schedule 3A to the Communications Act 2003; and for connected purposes.
  - Citation: 2021 c. 7
  - Introduced by: Matt Warman (Commons); Baroness Barran (Lords)
  Dates
  - Royal assent: 15 March 2021
  Status: Current legislation
  History of passage through Parliament
  Text of the Telecommunications Infrastructure (Leasehold Property) Act 2021 as in force today (including any amendments) within the United Kingdom, from legislation.gov.uk.
- The Telecommunications Infrastructure (Leasehold Property) Act 2021 (c. 7) allows broadband providers in England and Wales to seek access rights by taking landlords and landowners to court if they and land owners do not respond to installation requests within 35 days.

== Notable prosecutions ==
- 2012: Paul Chambers made a joke on Twitter in response to Robin Hood Airport cancelling flights. He said that unless the facility resolved the problem within a week, he would be "blowing the airport sky high". After an off-duty manager discovered the post, Chambers was arrested by anti-terror police. He was found guilty, lost his job and was ordered to pay a £385 fine and £600 in costs. However, after a strong public outcry and three appeals, the case was eventually overturned.
- 2014: A Lincolnshire man was charged with being grossly offensive after posting a photograph of a police officer on social media, with two phalluses drawn on it. The offending picture was passed on to Lincolnshire Police, who arrested the 20-year-old. He was ordered to pay £400 in compensation to the officer in question, in addition to £85 costs and a £60 victim surcharge.
- 2017: R v Mwaikambo where a 43-year-old man posted one video and seven pictures of a victim of the Grenfell Tower fire to his Facebook account. Notable in this case was the rapidity of conviction: the fire occurred on 14 June and the case was heard but two days later. Mwaikambo was sentenced to three months in prison.
- 2018: Mark Meechan, a comedian and social commentator, was convicted under the Communications Act in 2018. He had made a video demonstrating how he had trained his girlfriend's dog to perform a Nazi salute upon hearing the phrase "Sieg Heil" and to respond to being asked if he wanted to "gas the Jews". Even though Meechan said that he was not actually racist and that it was a joke intended to annoy his girlfriend, the court found him guilty of being "grossly offensive" on 20 March. He was fined £800 at Airdrie Sheriff Court on 23 April 2018.
- 2018: A Merseyside woman was convicted under the Communications Act for posting rap lyrics on Instagram which were deemed 'racist', due to them including racially charged language. Chelsea Russell had used lyrics from a Snap Dogg song as a tribute to a boy who died in a road accident. She was sentenced to an eight-week community order, along with an eight-week curfew. She was also ordered to pay costs of £500 and an £85 victim surcharge. Her conviction was quashed on appeal in February 2019.
- 2020: Kate Scottow was convicted in February 2020 for tweeting transphobic insults. This conviction was quashed on appeal in December 2020.
- 2020: Conservative Party candidate Joshua Spencer was sentenced to 9 weeks in prison under section 127 for sending threatening messages to Yvette Cooper and her constituency staff.

== See also ==
- UK public service law
- Telecommunications Act 1997, Australia
- Telecommunications Act (Canada)
- Telecommunications Act of 1996, United States
