= UK Calling =

2015 British phone call pricing legislation

UK Calling is the name given to the legislation introduced by Ofcom in July 2015 to make the cost of calling UK service numbers clearer for everyone.

The legislation was brought in due to the previous confusion surrounding service call charges, with the intention of making things simpler for the caller. The system also made Freephone numbers free to call from mobile phones, just as they are from landlines.

UK Calling was the biggest change to UK telephone calls for over a decade. The information campaign that accompanied the changes was led by Ofcom, who worked alongside major landline and mobile companies including Three UK, Vodafone and Virgin Media.

== History ==
Before the UK Calling system was introduced, callers would often be given unclear information about the costs of calls made to service numbers. Advertisements of service numbers were often accompanied by messages such as:

“Calls cost 20p per minute from a BT landline. Other landlines may vary and calls from mobiles may cost considerably more.”

These messages were seen as confusing by many, with the cost hard to decipher unless the call was made from a BT landline. Following research also found that phone users were sometimes confused by the charges of calling service numbers. This lack of confidence caused some people to avoid using service numbers where possible.

== The new system ==
As of 1 July 2015, the cost of calling service numbers is made up of two parts:

• An access charge: This part of the call charge goes to the caller’s telephone company, charged as pence per minute. The phone company is in charge of telling the caller how much the access charge for these calls is.

• A service charge: The service charge makes up the rest of the call charge. The organisation being called decides this, and must inform the caller how much it is immediately alongside the number wherever the number is promoted or mentioned. It can be charged on either, or both, a per-call and/or per-minute basis.

The legislation applies to all consumer calls to 084, 087, 09 and 118 numbers across the UK. It doesn’t affect calls made from payphones, international calls, or calls made to the UK when roaming overseas.

== Freephone ==
Before the UK Calling changes, calls to ‘Freephone’ numbers were generally free when called from a landline, however mobile users were usually charged for calling them.

The 1 July legislation made all calls to 0800 and 0808 numbers free for consumers to dial from mobile phones, just as they are from landlines.

== What this means for businesses ==
Before the legislation was introduced, all organisations using non-geographic service numbers were advised to be aware of the changes, and to amend relevant advertising materials where necessary. All applicable organisations were urged to find out the service charge for their numbers and then, if happy with this charge, ensure to display it wherever their number is shown or promoted. Ofcom recommended that the following wording should be displayed alongside the number:

“Calls cost xp [or xp per minute] plus your phone company's access charge.”

Before the changes came into effect, Ofcom distributed leaflets across the UK to explain what was to happen. These leaflets stated when the UK Calling changes were to be introduced and included information about the new call charges.

== See also ==
- PhONEday
- Big Number Change
