= List of statutory instruments of the United Kingdom, 2017 =

This is a list of statutory instruments made in the United Kingdom in 2017.

== 1–100 ==
Number	Title
Not Numbered	The Local Government Finance Act 1988 (Non-Domestic Rating Multipliers) (England) Order 2017
1	The Immigration (European Economic Area) (Amendment) Regulations 2017
2	The Compulsory Purchase of Land (Prescribed Forms) (Ministers) (Amendment) Regulations 2017
3	The Compulsory Purchase of Land (Vesting Declarations) (England) Regulations 2017
4 (C. 1)	The Crime and Courts Act 2013 (Commencement No. 16 and Savings) Order 2017
5 (W. 1)	The A494 Trunk Road (Deeside Park Interchange to the Wales/England border, Flintshire) (Temporary Prohibition of Vehicles, Cyclists & Pedestrians) Order 2017
6 (C. 2))	The Education and Adoption Act 2016 (Commencement No. 3) Regulations 2017
7	The Public Lending Right Scheme 1982 (Commencement of Variation) Order 2017
8	The Plant Health (England) (Amendment) Order 2017 (revoked)
9	The Coasting Schools (England) Regulations 2017
10	The Taxation of Chargeable Gains (Gilt-edged Securities) Order 2017
11	The Registered Pension Schemes (Provision of Information) (Amendment) Regulations 2017
12 (W. 2)	The A470 Trunk Road (Trawsfynydd, Gwynedd) (Temporary Speed Restrictions & No Overtaking) Order 2017
13	The Council Tax (Demand Notices) (England) (Amendment) Regulations 2017
14 (W. 3)	The A487 Trunk Road (Talyllyn, Gwynedd) (Temporary Speed Restrictions & No Overtaking) Order 2017
15 (W. 4)	The A470 Trunk Road (Llanelltyd to Ganllwyd, Gwynedd) (Temporary Speed Restrictions & No Overtaking) Order 2017
16	The Housing and Planning Act 2016 (Compulsory Purchase) (Corresponding Amendments) Regulations 2017
17 (W. 5)	The A470 Trunk Road (Llan Ffestiniog, Gwynedd) (Temporary 10 mph Speed Limit & No Overtaking) Order 2017
18 (W. 6)	The A494 Trunk Road (Cefnddwysarn to North of Bala, Gwynedd) (Temporary Speed Restrictions & No Overtaking) Order 2017
19 (W. 7)	The A4042 Trunk Road (Pontypool Roundabout to Edlogan Way Roundabout, Torfaen) (Temporary Traffic Prohibitions & Restrictions) Order 2017
20 (C. 3)	The Gambling Act (Licensing and Advertising) 2014 (Commencement No. 2) Order 2017
21	The Employment and Support Allowance (Consequential Amendment) (Police Injury Benefit) Regulations 2017
22	The Legal Services Act 2007 (Claims Management Complaints) (Fees) (Amendment) Regulations 2017
23	The Legal Services Act 2007 (Claims Management Complaints) (Fees) (Amendment) Regulations 2017
24 (W. 8)	The A55 Trunk Road (Conwy Tunnel, Conwy County Borough) (Temporary Traffic Prohibitions and Restrictions) Order 2017
25 (W. 9)	The Non-Domestic Rating (Small Business Relief) (Wales) (Amendment) Order 2017
26 (W. 10)	The Rentcharges (Redemption Price) (Wales) Regulations 2017
27	The Legal Services Act 2007 (Designation as a Licensing Authority) Order 2017
28	The Air Navigation (Dangerous Goods) (Amendment) Regulations 2017
29 (W. 11)	The A470 Trunk Road (Coed y Brenin to Bronaber, Gwynedd) (Temporary Speed Restrictions & No Overtaking) Order 2017
30 (W. 12)	The A483 Trunk Road (South of Newtown, Powys) (Temporary Prohibition of Wide Vehicles) Order 2017
31 (W. 13)	The A458 Trunk Road (East of Buttington Roundabout, Buttington, Powys) (Temporary Prohibition of Vehicles) Order 2017
32	The Northern Ireland (Date of the Next Assembly Poll) Order 2017
33	Not Allocated
34	The Harrogate Stray Act 1985 (Tour de Yorkshire) Order 2017
35	The Air Navigation (Restriction of Flying) (Wimbledon) Regulations 2017
36	The Air Navigation (Restriction of Flying) (Cheltenham Festival) Regulations 2017
37	The School Information (England) (Amendment) Regulations 2017
38 (W. 15)	The A483 Trunk road (Rhosmaen Street, Llandeilo, Carmarthenshire) (Full & Part-Time 20 mph Speed Limit) Order 2017
39	The Non-Domestic Rating (Demand Notices) (Amendment) (England) Regulations 2017
40 (W. 16)	The Council Tax (Demand Notices) (Wales) (Amendment) Regulations 2017
41 (W. 17)	The Council Tax (Administration and Enforcement) (Amendment) (Wales) Regulations 2017
42 (W. 18)	The Council Tax (Prescribed Classes of Dwellings) (Wales) (Amendment) Regulations 2017
43 (C. 4)	The Bank of England and Financial Services Act 2016 (Commencement No. 4 and Saving Provision) Regulations 2017
44	The School and Early Years Finance (England) Regulations 2017
45 (W. 19)	The A494 Trunk road (Bala, Gwynedd) (Temporary 10 MPH Speed Limit & No Overtaking) Order 2017
46 (W. 20)	The Council Tax Reduction Schemes (Prescribed Requirements and Default Scheme) (Wales) (Amendment) Regulations 2017
47 (W. 21)	The Education (Student Support) (Wales) Regulations 2017
48	The Air Navigation (Restriction of Flying) (Stonehenge) Regulations 2017
49	The Air navigation (Restriction of Flying) (Royal Air Force Linton-on-Ouse) Regulations 2017
50	The Pension Protection Fund and Occupational Pension Schemes (Levy Ceiling and Compensation Cap) Order 2017 (revoked)
51 (W. 22)	The Children's Homes (Wales) (Amendment) Regulations 2017
52 (W. 23)	The Regulation and Inspection of Social Care (Wales) Act 2016 (Consequential Amendments to Secondary Legislation) Regulations 2017
53	The Civil Legal Aid (Procedure) (Amendment) Regulations 2017
54 (W. 24)	The A494 Trunk Road (Gwyddelwern, Denbighshire) (Temporary 40 mph Speed Limit) Order 2017
55 (W. 25)	The A5 Trunk Road (Tŷ Nant, Conwy County Borough) (Temporary 30 mph Speed Limit & No Overtaking) Order 2017
56 (W. 26)	The Care and Support (Area Planning) (Wales) Regulations 2017
57 (C. 5)	The Welfare Reform Act 2012 (Commencement No. 11, 13, 16, 22, 23 and 24 and Transitional and Transitory Provisions (Modification)) Order 2017
58 (C. 6)	The Water Act 2014 (Commencement No. 8 and Transitional Provisions) Order 2017
59	Not Allocated
60	The Air Navigation (Restriction of Flying) (Folkestone) Regulations 2017
61	The East Lancashire Hospitals NHS Trust (Establishment) and the Blackburn, Hyndburn and Ribble Valley Health Care National Health Service Trust and Burnley Health Care National Health Service Trust (Dissolution) (Amendment) Order 2017
62	The Food for Specific Groups (Information and Compositional Requirements) (England) (Amendment) Regulations 2017
63 (W. 27)	The A40 Trunk Road (Llandeilo to Carmarthen, Carmarthenshire) (Temporary Prohibition of Vehicles & 40 mph Speed Limit) Order 2017
64	The Education (National Curriculum) (Key Stage 2 Assessment Arrangements) (England) (Amendment) Order 2017
65 (W. 28)	The A483 Trunk Road (Junction 3 (Croesfoel Roundabout) to Junction 7 (Rossett Interchange), Wrexham County Borough) (Temporary Traffic Prohibitions and Restriction) Order 2017
66	The Fixed Penalty (Amendment) Order 2017
67	The Combined Authorities (Mayoral Elections) Order 2017
68	The Combined Authorities (Overview and Scrutiny Committees, Access to Information and Audit Committees) Order 2017
69	The Combined Authorities (Mayors) (Filling of Vacancies) Order 2017
70 (C. 7)	The Enterprise Act 2016 (Commencement No. 2) Regulations 2017
71	The Veterinary Surgeons and Veterinary Practitioners (Registration) (Amendment) Regulations Order of Council 2017
72	The Air Navigation (Restriction of Flying) (St. Thomas Head, Weston-super-Mare) (Emergency) Regulations 2017
73 (W. 29)	The A5 Trunk Road (Dinmael, Conwy County Borough) (Temporary Speed Restrictions and No Overtaking) Order 2017
74	The Proceeds of Crime Act 2002 (References to Financial Investigators) (Amendment) Order 2017 (revoked)
75 (C. 8)	The Housing and Planning Act 2016 (Commencement No. 4 and Transitional Provisions) Regulations 2017
76	The Hertfordshire (Electoral Changes) (Amendment) Order 2017
77	The M5 Motorway (Junctions 4a to 6)(Variable Speed Limits) Regulations 2017
78	The Air Navigation (Restriction of Flying) (St. Thomas Head, Weston-super-Mare) (Emergency) (Revocation) Regulations 2017
79	The Occupational and Personal Pension Schemes (Automatic Enrolment) (Amendment) Regulations 2017
80	The Bank of England and Financial Services (Consequential Amendments) Regulations 2017
81 (W. 30)	The Noise from Audible Intruder Alarms (Wales) (Revocation) and Control of Noise (Codes of Practice for Construction and Open Sites) (Wales) Order 2017
82	The Cotswold (Electoral Changes) Order 2017
83	The Export Control (North Korea Sanctions and Iran, Ivory Coast and Syria Amendment) Order 2017
84	The Ministry of Defence Police (Conduct, Performance and Appeals Tribunals) (Amendment) Regulations 2017
85	The Export Control (Amendment) Order 2017
86 (W. 31)	The A487 & A40 Trunk Roads (Fishguard, Pembrokeshire) (20 mph Speed Limit) Order 2017
87	Not Allocated
88 (W. 32) (C. 9)	The Water Act 2003 (Commencement No. 4) (Wales) Order 2017
89	The Port of Teignmouth (Transfer of Undertaking) Harbour Revision Order 2017
90 (W. 33)	The Welsh Language Standards (No. 6) Regulations 2017
91	The Social Housing Rents (Exceptions and Miscellaneous Provisions) (Amendment) Regulations 2017
92 (W. 34)	The Education Workforce Council (Registration Fees) Regulations 2017
93 (W. 35)	The A5 Trunk Road (Pentrefoelas, Conwy County Borough) (Temporary Speed Restrictions & No Overtaking) Order 2017
94 (W. 36)	The A494 Trunk Road (Llanferres, Denbighshire) (Temporary Speed Restrictions & No Overtaking) Order 2017
95 (L. 1)	The Civil Procedure (Amendment) Rules 2017
96 (W. 37)	The M4 motorway (Slip Roads at Junction 28 (Tredegar Park), Newport) (Temporary 40 mph Speed Limit) Order 2017
97 (W. 38)	The A5 Trunk Road (Pont Rhydlanfair to east of Padog, Conwy County Borough) (Temporary Speed Restrictions & No Overtaking) Order 2017
98	The Air Navigation (Restriction of Flying) (Bolesworth Castle) Regulations 2017
99	The Rights of Passengers in Bus and Coach Transport (Exemptions and Enforcement) (Amendment) Regulations 2017
100	The Criminal Justice and Courts Act 2015 (Disapplication of Sections 88 and 89) Regulations 2017

== 101–200 ==
Number	Title
101	The Cattle Identification (Amendment) Regulations 2017
102	The Non-Domestic Rating (Reliefs, Thresholds and Amendment) (England) Order 2017
103	The Police and Criminal Evidence Act 1984 (Codes of Practice) (Revision of Codes C, D and H) Order 2017
104	The Road Traffic Offenders Act 1988 (Penalty Points) (Amendment) Order 2017
105	The Infrastructure Planning (Compulsory Acquisition) (Amendment) Regulations 2017
106	The Electricity (Connection Charges) Regulations 2017
107 (C. 10)	The Equality Act 2010 (Commencement No. 12) Order 2017
108 (C. 11)	The Infrastructure Act 2015 (Commencement No. 6 and Savings) Regulations 2017
109	The Elections (Policy Development Grants Scheme) (Amendment) Order 2017
110	Not Allocated
111 (C. 12)	The Pensions Act 2014 (Commencement No. 9) and the Welfare Reform and Work Act 2016 (Commencement No. 4) Regulations 2017
112	The Contracts for Difference (Standard Terms) (Amendment) Regulations 2017
113 (W. 39)	The Non-Domestic Rating (Demand Notices) (Wales) Regulations 2017
114	The Education (Student Fees, Awards and Support) (Amendment) Regulations 2017
115	The Great Place (England) Joint Scheme (Authorisation) Order 2017
116	The Air Navigation (Restriction of Flying) (Abingdon Air and Country Show) Regulations 2017
117	The Ashford (Electoral Changes) Order 2017
118	The St Edmundsbury (Electoral Changes) Order 2017
119	The Cherwell (Electoral Changes) Order 2017
120	The Cherwell (Electoral Changes) (No. 2) Order 2017
121	The Qualifications Wales Act 2015 (Consequential Provision) Order 2017
122 (W. 40)	The A477 Trunk Road (Old Amroth Road Junction, Pembrokeshire to East of Llanteg, Carmarthenshire) (Temporary Traffic Restrictions and No Overtaking) Order 2017
123 (W. 41)	The A470 Trunk Road (North of Betws y Coed, Conwy County Borough) (Temporary Speed Restrictions & No Overtaking) Order 2017
124 (W. 42)	The A470 & A479 Trunk Roads (Llyswen, Powys) (Temporary 30 mph Speed Limit) Order 2017
125	The Plant Health (Fees) (England) (Amendment) Regulations 2017
126	The West of England Combined Authority Order 2017
127	The Air Navigation (Restriction of Flying) (Royal Air Force Cosford) Regulations 2017
128	The Vale of White Horse (Electoral Changes) Order 2017
129	The South Oxfordshire (Electoral Changes) Order 2017
130	The Trade Union Act 2016 (Political Funds) (Transition Period) Regulations 2017
131	The Feed-in Tariffs (Amendment) Order 2017
132	The Important Public Services (Health) Regulations 2017
133	The Important Public Services (Education) Regulations 2017
134	The Important Public Services (Fire) Regulations 2017
135	The Important Public Services (Transport) Regulations 2017
136	The Important Public Services (Border Security) Regulations 2017
137 (C. 13)	The Investigatory Powers Act 2016 (Commencement No. 2 and Transitory Provision) Regulations 2017
138	The Universal Credit (Benefit Cap Earnings Exception) Amendment Regulations 2017
139 (C. 14)	The Trade Union Act 2016 (Commencement No. 3 and Transitional) Regulations 2017
140 (W. 43)	The Social Care Wales (Proceedings before Panels) (Amendment) Regulations 2017
141	Not Allocated
142	Not Allocated
143 (C. 15)	The Investigatory Powers Act 2016 (Commencement No. 2 and Transitory Provision) (Amendment) Regulations 2017
144 (L. 2)	The Criminal Procedure (Amendment) Rules 2017
145	The Local Elections (Principal Areas) (Welsh Forms) (Amendment) Order 2017
146	The Local Elections (Communities) (Welsh Forms) (Amendment) Order 2017
147	The Protection of Military Remains Act 1986 (Designation of Vessels and Controlled Sites) Order 2017
148	The Defence Science and Technology Laboratory Trading Fund (Revocation) Order 2017
149	The Personal Injuries (Civilians) Scheme (Amendment) Order 2017
150	The National Health Service Litigation Authority (Amendment) Regulations 2017
151	The Air navigation (Restriction of Flying) (Duxford) Regulations 2017
152 (W. 44) (C. 16)	The Environment (Wales) Act 2016 (Commencement No. 1) Order 2017
153	The Railway Pensions (Substitution) (Amendment) Order 2017
154 (W. 45)	The Education Workforce Council (Accreditation of Initial Teacher Training) (Additional Functions) (Wales) Order 2017
155	The Non-Domestic Rating (Alteration of Lists and Appeals) (England) (Amendment) Regulations 2017
156	The Valuation Tribunal for England (Council Tax and Rating Appeals) (Procedure) (Amendment) Regulations 2017
157	The Terrorist Asset-Freezing etc. Act 2010 (Overseas Territories) (Amendment) Order 2017
158	The Inspectors of Education, Children's Services and Skills Order 2017
159	The Social Security (Reciprocal Agreements) Order 2017
160	The Democratic Republic of the Congo (Sanctions) (Overseas Territories) (Amendment) Order 2017
161	The Naval, Military and Air Forces Etc. (Disablement and Death) Service Pensions (Amendment) Order 2017
162	The Patents (Isle of Man) (Amendment) Order 2017 (revoked)
163	The St Edmundsbury (Electoral Changes) (Amendment) Order 2017
164	The Personal Injuries (NHS Charges) (Amounts) Amendment Regulations 2017
165 (W. 46)	The Education Workforce Council (Accreditation of Initial Teacher Training) (Wales) Regulations 2017
166 (W. 47)	The A487 Trunk Road (Llanarth, Ceredigion) (Temporary 40 mph, 30 mph & Part-time 20 mph Speed Limits) Order 2017
167 (W. 48)	The A55 Trunk Road (Eastbound Carriageway between Junction 33 (Northop) & Junction 33b (Ewloe), Flintshire) (Temporary Prohibition of Vehicles, Cyclists & Pedestrians) Order 2017
168 (W. 49)	The Fire and Rescue Services (Emergencies) (Wales) (Amendment) Order 2017
169	The Syria (Restrictive Measures) (Overseas Territories) (Amendment) Order 2017
170	Not Allocated
171	Not Allocated
172	The Equality Act 2010 (Gender Pay Gap Information) Regulations 2017
173	The Assisted Areas (Amendment) Order 2017
174	The Social Security (Income-Related Benefits) Amendment Regulations 2017
175	The Employment Rights (Increase of Limits) Order 2017
176 (W. 50)	The A487 Trunk Road (Furnace, Ceredigion to north of Dovey Junction, Powys) (Temporary Prohibition of Vehicles) Order 2017
177 (W. 51)	The A44 Trunk Road (Capel Bangor to Blaengeuffordd, Ceredigion) (Temporary 40 mph and Part-time 20 mph Speed Limits) Order 2017
178	The Plant Health (Sweet Chestnut Blight) (England) Order 2017
179 (W. 52)	The A470 & A494 Trunk Roads (Dolgellau Bypass, Gwynedd) (Temporary Speed Restrictions & No Overtaking) Order 2017
180 (W. 53)	The A487 Trunk Road (Llanllyfni Bypass, Gwynedd) (Temporary Speed Restrictions and No Overtaking) Order 2017
181	The Emergency Powers (Overseas Territories) Order 2017
182 (W. 54)	The A487 Trunk Road (North of Dyfi Bridge to North of the B4404 Llanwrin Junction, Gwynedd) (Temporary Prohibitions, Speed Restrictions & No Overtaking) Order 2017
183	The Air Navigation (Restriction of Flying) (Torbay) Regulations 2017
184	The High Speed Rail (London – West Midlands) (Nomination) Order 2017
185	The Child Trust Funds (Amendment) Regulations 2017
186	The Individual Savings Account (Amendment) Regulations 2017
187 (L. 3)	The Court of Protection (Amendment) Rules 2017
188	The Air Navigation (Restriction of Flying) (Her Majesty The Queen's Birthday Flypast) (Rehearsals) Regulations 2017
189 (C. 17)	The Criminal Justice and Courts Act 2015 (Commencement No. 6) Order 2017
190)	The Air Navigation (Restriction of Flying) (Wales National Airshow) Regulations 2017
191	The Air Navigation (Restriction of Flying) (Silverstone and Turweston) Regulations 2017
192	The Civil Legal Aid (Immigration Interviews) (Exceptions) (Amendment) Regulations 2017
193	The Export Control (Amendment) (No. 2) Order 2017
194	The Social Security (Personal Independence Payment) (Amendment) Regulations 2017
195	The Electricity (Necessary Wayleaves and Felling and Lopping of Trees) (Charges) (England and Wales) (Amendment) Regulations 2017
196	The Electricity (Applications for Consent) (Amendment) (England and Wales) Regulations 2017
197	The Universal Credit (Surpluses and Self-employed Losses) (Change of coming into force) Regulations 2017
198 (L. 4)	The Courts Act 2003 (Amendment) Order 2017
199	The Homes and Communities Agency (Transfer of Property etc) Regulations 2017
200 (W. 55)	The Care Standards Act 2000 (Extension of the Application of Part 2 to Private Dental Practices) (Wales) Regulations 2017

== 201–300 ==
Number	Title
201 (W. 56)	The Registration of Private Dentistry (Wales) Regulations 2017
202 (W. 57)	The Private Dentistry (Wales) Regulations 2017
203	The Occupational and Personal Pension Schemes (General Levy) (Amendment) Regulations 2017 (revoked)
204	The Employment and Support Allowance and Universal Credit (Miscellaneous Amendments and Transitional and Savings Provisions) Regulations 2017
205	The Employment and Support Allowance (Exempt Work & Hardship Amounts) (Amendment) Regulations 2017
206	The Damages (Personal Injury) Order 2017
207	The Medical Devices (Fees Amendment) Regulations 2017
208	The Judicial Pensions (Additional Voluntary Contributions) Regulations 1995 (Amendment) Regulations 2017
209 (C. 18)	The High Speed Rail (London – West Midlands) Act 2017 (Commencement) Regulations 2017
210	The High Speed Rail (London – West Midlands) (Qualifying Authorities) Order 2017
211	The CRC Energy Efficiency Scheme (Allocation of Allowances for Payment) (Amendment) Regulations 2017
212	The National Health Service Commissioning Board (Additional Functions) Regulations 2017
213	The Housing Benefit and Universal Credit (Size Criteria) (Miscellaneous Amendments) Regulations 2017
214 (W. 58)	The Care and Support (Choice of Accommodation, Charging and Financial Assessment) (Miscellaneous Amendments) (Wales) Regulations 2017
215	The North London Heat and Power Generating Station Order 2017
216	The Air Navigation (Restriction of Flying) (Trooping the Colour) Regulations 2017
217	The Air Navigation (Restriction of Flying) (Glastonbury Festival) Regulations 2017
218	The Democratic People's Republic of Korea (European Union Financial Sanctions) Regulations 2017
219	The National Health Service (Direct Payments) (Amendment) Regulations 2017
220	The Guaranteed Minimum Pensions Increase Order 2017
221	The Communications (Television Licensing) (Amendment) Regulations 2017
222 (W. 59)	The A5 Trunk Road (Tŷ Glan Conwy Corner, west of Pentrefoelas, Conwy County Borough) (Temporary 30 mph Speed Limit & No Overtaking) Order 2017
223	The High Speed Rail (London – West Midlands) (Fees for Requests for Planning Approval) Regulations 2017
224 (W. 60)	The A483 Trunk Road (Pen-y-Banc Road, Ammanford, Carmarthenshire) (Part-time 20 mph Speed Limit) Order 2017
225 (C. 19)	The Legal Aid, Sentencing and Punishment of Offenders Act 2012 (Alcohol Abstinence and Monitoring Requirements) Piloting (Amendment) Order 2017
226 (W. 61)	The A483 Trunk Road (Pontardulais Road, Tycroes, Carmarthenshire) (Part-time 20 mph Speed Limit) Order 2017
227	The High Speed Rail (London – West Midlands) (Planning Appeals) (Written Representations Procedure) (England) Regulations 2017
228 (W. 62)	The A5 Trunk Road (Conwy/Gwynedd Border to Capel Curig, Conwy County Borough) (Temporary Speed Restrictions and No Overtaking) Order 2017
229	Not Allocated
230	The Recovery of Costs (Remand to Youth Detention Accommodation) (Amendment) Regulations 2017
231 (W. 64)	The A458 Trunk Road (East of Mallwyd, Gwynedd) (Temporary 30 mph Speed Limit & No Overtaking) Order 2017
232	The Social Security (Industrial Injuries) (Prescribed Diseases) Amendment Regulations 2017
233	The Code of Practice (Industrial Action Ballots and Notice to Employers) Order 2017
234	The Criminal Justice Act 2003 (Alcohol Abstinence and Monitoring Requirement) (Prescription of Arrangement for Monitoring) (Amendment) Order 2017
235	The Criminal Justice (Electronic Monitoring) (Responsible Person) Order 2017
236 (C. 20)	The Crime and Courts Act 2013 (Commencement No. 17, Transitional and Savings Provisions) Order 2017
237	The Code of Practice (Picketing) Order 2017
238	The Health and Safety (Miscellaneous Amendments) Regulations 2017 (revoked)
239 (C. 21) (W. 65)	The Higher Education (Wales) Act 2015 (Commencement No. 3) Order 2017
240	The Offshore Funds (Tax) (Amendment) Regulations 2017
241	The Scottish Fiscal Commission Act 2016 (Consequential Provisions and Modifications) Order 2017
242	The Public Service Pensions Revaluation Order 2017
243	The County of Merseyside Act 1980 (Amendment) Regulations 2017
244	The Sewerage Services (Exception from Sewerage System Prohibition) (England) Regulations 2017
245	Her Majesty's Chief Inspector of Education, Children's Services and Skills (Fees and Frequency of Inspections) (Children's Homes etc.) (Amendment) Regulations 2017
246	The Water Supply and Sewerage Services (Customer Service Standards) (Amendment) Regulations 2017
247	The Armed Forces and Reserve Forces (Compensation Scheme) (Amendment) Order 2017
248	Not Allocated
249	The Childcare Act 2006 (Provision of Information to Parents) (England) (Amendment) Regulations 2017
250	The Tees Valley Combined Authority (Functions) Order 2017
251	The Cambridgeshire and Peterborough Combined Authority Order 2017
252	The Universal Credit (Housing Costs Element for claimants aged 18 to 21) (Amendment) Regulations 2017 (revoked)
253 (W. 66)	The A487 Trunk Road (Ysgol Tal y Bont, Ceredigion) (Temporary Part-time 20 mph Speed Limit) Order 2017
254 (W. 67)	The A494 Trunk Road (Bala to Llanuwchllyn, Gwynedd) (Temporary Speed Restrictions & No Overtaking) Order 2017
255 (W. 68)	The A487 Trunk Road (Caernarfon to Plas Menai Roundabout, Gwynedd) (Temporary Speed Restrictions & No Overtaking) Order 2017
256 (W. 69)	The A5 Trunk Road (Llangollen, Denbighshire) (Temporary 10 mph Speed Limit & No Overtaking) Order 2017
257	The Network Rail (Northumberland Park Level Crossing and Coppermill Lane Level Crossing Closure) Order 2017
258	The Air Navigation (Restriction of Flying) (Headcorn) Regulations 2017
259 (C. 22)	The Finance Act 2016, Schedule 21 (Appointed Days) Regulations 2017
260	The Social Security Benefits Up-rating Order 2017 (revoked)
261 (C. 23)	The Finance Act 2016, Section 164 (Appointed Day) Regulations 2017
262	The Air Navigation (Restriction of Flying) (Kilburn, London) (Emergency) Regulations 2017
263	The Air Navigation (Restriction of Flying) (RNAS Yeovilton) Regulations 2017
264	The Air Navigation (Restriction of Flying) (Sunderland) Regulations 2017
265	The Air Navigation (Restriction of Flying) (Ventnor) (Emergency) Regulations 2017
266 (W. 70)	The A470 Trunk Road (Moat Lane Level Crossing, Caersws, Powys) (Temporary Prohibition of Vehicles) Order 2017
267	The Economic Growth (Regulatory Functions) Order 2017
268	The Deregulation Act 2015 (Growth Duty Guidance) Order 2017
269 (W. 71)	The A483 Trunk Road (Llanelwedd Church in Wales Primary School, Llanelwedd, Powys) (Temporary 30 mph and Part-time 20 mph Speed Limits) Order 2017
270	The Social Security (Fees Payable by Qualifying Lenders) (Amendment) Regulations 2017
271	The Social Fund (Amendment) Regulations 2017
272	The Civil Enforcement of Parking Contraventions Designation and Consequential Amendment Order 2017
273 (C. 24)	The Deregulation Act 2015 (Commencement No. 7) Order 2017
274 (W. 72)	The Local Authority Social Services Annual Reports (Prescribed Form) (Wales) Regulations 2017
275	The National Health Service Pension Scheme and Additional Voluntary Contributions (Amendment) Regulations 2017
276	The Housing and Planning Act 2016 (Permission in Principle etc) (Miscellaneous Amendments) (England) Regulations 2017
277 (C. 25)	The Finance Act 2016, Schedule 22 (Appointed Days) Regulations 2017
278 (W. 73)	The M4 Motorway (Junction 34 (Miskin), Rhondda Cynon Taf and Vale of Glamorgan) (Temporary Prohibition of Traffic & 50 MPH Speed Limit) Order 2017
279	The Harbour Directions (Designation of Harbour Authorities) Order 2017
280 (W. 74)	The Marine Licensing (Fees) (Wales) Regulations 2017
281 (C. 26)	The Housing and Planning Act 2016 (Commencement No. 5, Transitional Provisions and Savings) Regulations 2017
282 (L. 5)	The Criminal Procedure (Amendment No. 2) Rules 2017
283 (W. 75)	The A40 Trunk Road (Brecon Road, Crickhowell, Powys) (Part-time 20 mph Speed Limit) Order 2017
284 (W. 76)	The A470 & A479 Trunk Roads (Llyswen, Powys) (30 mph & Part-time 20 mph Speed Limits) Order 2017
285 (W. 77)	A4076 Trunk Road (Haverfordwest to Johnston, Pembrokeshire) (Temporary Prohibition of Vehicles) Order 2017
286 (W. 78)	The A44 Trunk Road (Llanbadarn Fawr, Ceredigion) (Temporary Prohibition of Vehicles) Order 2017
287	The Social Security Revaluation of Earnings Factors Order 2017
288	The Seeds (Miscellaneous Amendments) (England) Regulations 2017
289	The Public Record Office (Fees) Regulations 2017
290	The Value Added Tax (Increase of Registration Limits) Order 2017
291	The Social Security (Social Care Wales) (Amendment) Regulations 2017
292	The Investment Allowance and Cluster Area Allowance (Investment Expenditure) Regulations 2017
293	The Income Tax (Relevant Maximum for Calculating Trade Profits on the Cash Basis) Order 2017
294	The Road Traffic Offenders (Additional Offences) Order 2017
295	The Value Added Tax (Amendment) Regulations 2017
296	The National Health Service Commissioning Board and Clinical Commissioning Groups (Responsibilities and Standing Rules) (Amendment) Regulations 2017
297 (C. 27)	The Pensions Act 2014 (Commencement No.10) Order 2017
298	Not Allocated
299	Not Allocated
300 (C. 28)	The Scotland Act 2016 (Commencement No. 4, Transitional and Savings) Regulations 2017

== 301–400 ==
Number	Title
301	The Pensions Act 2014 (Pension Protection Fund: Increased Compensation Cap for Long Service) (Pension Compensation Sharing on Divorce) (Transitional Provision) Order 2017
302	The Gambling (Personal Licence Fees) (Amendment) Regulations 2017
303	The Gambling (Operating Licence and Single-Machine Permit Fees) Regulations 2017
304	The Health and Safety (Miscellaneous Amendments and Revocation) Regulations 2017
305	The Taxes (Interest Rate) (Amendment) Regulations 2017
306	The Policing and Crime Act 2017 (Possession of Pyrotechnic Articles at Musical Events) Regulations 2017
307	The Social Security (Miscellaneous Amendments) Regulations 2017
308	Not Allocated
309 (C. 29) (W. 80)	The Regulation and Inspection of Social Care (Wales) Act 2016 (Commencement No. 3, Savings and Transitional Provisions) Order 2017
310	The Government Resources and Accounts Act 2000 (Estimates and Accounts) Order 2017
311	The Criminal Legal Aid (Standard Crime Contract) (Amendment) Regulations 2017
312	The Church of England Pensions (Amendment) Regulations 2017
313 (W. 81)	The A483 Trunk Road (New Road & Llanfair Road, Llandovery, Carmarthenshire) (Part-time 20 mph Speed Limit) Order 2017
314	The Infrastructure Planning Fees (Amendment) Regulations 2017
315 (C. 30)	The Infrastructure Act 2015 (Commencement No. 7) Regulations 2017
316	The Ecclesiastical Offices (Terms of Service) (Amendment) Regulations 2017
317	The Turks and Caicos Islands (Finance) Order 2017
318	The Non-Domestic Rating (Designated Areas etc.) Regulations 2017
319	The North Korea (United Nations Sanctions) (Amendment) Order 2017
320	The Democratic People's Republic of Korea (Sanctions) (Overseas Territories) (Amendment) Order 2017
321	The Nursing and Midwifery (Amendment) Order 2017
322	The National Health Service Commissioning Board and Clinical Commissioning Groups (Responsibilities and Standing Rules) (Amendment) (No. 2) Regulations 2017
323	The Oil and Gas Authority (Levy) Regulations 2017
324	The Pension Protection Fund (Modification) (Amendment) Regulations 2017
325	The Freight Containers (Safety Convention) Regulations 2017
326	The Isles of Scilly (Electoral Changes) Order 2017
327 (W. 82)	The Non-Domestic Rating (Miscellaneous Provisions) (Wales) Regulations 2017
328	The Trade Union (Facility Time Publication Requirements) Regulations 2017
329	The Social Security (Scottish Infected Blood Support Scheme) Regulations 2017
330	The Glyn Rhonwy Pumped Storage Generating Station Order 2017
331 (C. 31)	The Deregulation Act 2015 (Commencement No. 8) Order 2017
332	The Landfill Tax (Amendment) Regulations 2017
333	The Childcare Act 2006 (Provision of Information to Parents) (England) (Amendment) (No. 2) Regulations 2017
334	The Asset-based Penalty for Offshore Inaccuracies and Failures (Reductions for Disclosure and Co-operation) Regulations 2017
335	Not Allocated
336	The Further Education Loans (Amendment) Regulations 2017
337	Not Allocated
338	The Taxation of Northern Ireland Welfare Supplementary Payments Regulations 2017
339 (W. 83)	The National Health Service (Dental Charges) (Wales) (Amendment) Regulations 2017
340 (W. 84)	The National Health Service (Welfare Reform Miscellaneous Amendments) (Wales) Regulations 2017
341	Not Allocated
342	The Equality Act 2010 (Taxis and Private Hire Vehicles) (Passengers in Wheelchairs – Notices of Exemption) Regulations 2017
343	The Brechfa Forest Wind Farm Connection (Correction) Order 2017
344	The Business Impact Target (Relevant Regulators) Regulations 2017
345	The Penalties Relating to Offshore Matters and Offshore Transfers (Additional Information) Regulations 2017
346 (C. 32)	The Enterprise Act 2016 (Commencement No. 3) Regulations 2017
347	The Employers’ Duties (Implementation) (Amendment) Regulations 2017
348	The Universal Credit (Reduction of the Earnings Taper Rate) Amendment Regulations 2017
349	The Social Security Benefits Up-rating Regulations 2017
350 (W. 85)	The A48 Trunk Road (Cross Hands Roundabout to South-East of Pensarn Roundabout) and the A40 Trunk Road (Pensarn Roundabout to St Clears Roundabout, Carmarthenshire) (Temporary Traffic Restrictions and Prohibition) Order 2017
351 (C. 33)	The Wales Act 2017 (Commencement No. 1) Regulations 2017
352 (W. 86)	The A55 Trunk Road (Junction 1, Kingsland Roundabout, Holyhead, Isle of Anglesey to east of Junction 11, Llys y Gwynt Interchange, Bangor, Gwynedd) (Temporary Prohibition of Vehicles & 40 MPH Speed Limit) Order 2017
353	The Equality Act 2010 (Specific Duties and Public Authorities) Regulations 2017
354	The Occupational Pension Schemes and Social Security (Schemes that were Contracted-out and Graduated Retirement Benefit) (Miscellaneous Amendments) Regulations 2017
355 (C. 34)	The Finance Act 2016, Section 113(1) to (4) (Commencement) Regulations 2017
356	The Selby Area Internal Drainage District Order 2017
357 (W. 87)	The Compulsory Purchase of Land (Prescribed Forms) (National Assembly for Wales) (Amendment) Regulations 2017
358	The Air Navigation (Restriction of Flying) (Eastbourne) Regulations 2017
359	The Air Navigation (Restriction of Flying) (East Kirkby) Regulations 2017
360	The Air Navigation (Restriction of Flying) (Clacton-on-Sea) Regulations 2017
361	The Childcare (Miscellaneous Amendments) Regulations 2017
362 (W. 88)	The Compulsory Purchase of Land (Vesting Declarations) (Wales) Regulations 2017
363	The Small Business, Enterprise and Employment Act 2015 (Commencement No. 6 and Transitional and Savings Provisions) Regulations 2016 (Amendment) Regulations 2017
364	The Corporation Tax Act 2010 (Part 8C) (Amendment) Regulations 2017
365	The Planning (Hazardous Substances) (Amendment) Regulations 2017
366	The Insolvency (England and Wales) (Amendment) Rules 2017
367	The Rent Repayment Orders and Financial Penalties (Amounts Recovered) (England) Regulations 2017
368	The Energy Performance of Buildings (England and Wales) (Amendment) Regulations 2017
369	The Insolvency (England and Wales) Rules 2016 (Consequential Amendments and Savings) Rules 2017
370	Cambrian Railways Order 2017
371	The Riot Compensation Regulations 2017
372	Not Allocated
373	The Social Security (Miscellaneous Amendments No. 2) Regulations 2017
374	The South Essex Partnership University NHS Foundation Trust and the North Essex Partnership University NHS Foundation Trust (Dissolution and Transfer of Property and Liabilities) Order 2017
375	The State Pension Debits and Credits (Revaluation) Order 2017
376	The Social Security (Restrictions on Amounts for Children and Qualifying Young Persons) Amendment Regulations 2017
377	The Capital Gains Tax (Annual Exempt Amount) Order 2017
378	The Housing and Planning Act 2016 (Consequential Provisions) (England) Regulations 2017
379 (C. 36)	The Riot Compensation Act 2016 (Commencement) Regulations 2017
380 (C. 37)	The Immigration Act 2016 (Commencement No. 3 and Transitional Provision) Regulations 2017
381	The Air Navigation (Restriction of Flying) (Weston-Super-Mare) Regulations 2017
382	The Air Navigation (Restriction of Flying) (Inverkip) (Revocation) Regulations 2017
383	The Air Navigation (Restriction of Flying) (Headcorn) (No. 2) Regulations 2017
384	The Air Navigation (Restriction of Flying) (Dunsfold) Regulations 2017
385	The Claims in respect of Loss or Damage arising from Competition Infringements (Competition Act 1998 and Other Enactments (Amendment)) Regulations 2017
386	The Social Security (Invalid Care Allowance) (Amendment) Regulations 2017
387	The Child Tax Credit (Amendment) Regulations 2017
388	The Gloucestershire Care Services National Health Service Trust (Establishment) (Amendment) Order 2017
389	The Judgments Enforcement (Northern Ireland) (Amendment) Order 2017
390	The Road Traffic Act 1988 (Motor Racing) (England) Regulations 2017
391	The Town and Country Planning (General Permitted Development) (England) (Amendment) Order 2017
392	The Town and Country Planning (Compensation) (England) (Amendment) Regulations 2017
393	The Pension Schemes Act 2015 (Judicial Pensions) (Consequential Provision) Regulations 2017
394	The Automatic Enrolment (Earnings Trigger and Qualifying Earnings Band) Order 2017
395	The Reporting on Payment Practices and Performance Regulations 2017
396	The Tax Credits (Definition and Calculation of Income) (Amendment) Regulations 2017
397	The Registered Pension Schemes (Authorised Payments) (Amendment) Regulations 2017
398	The Pension Schemes (Categories of Country and Requirements for Overseas Pension Schemes and Recognised Overseas Pension Schemes) (Amendments) Regulations 2017
399 (C. 38)	The Policing and Crime Act 2017 (Commencement No. 1 and Transitional Provisions) Regulations 2017
400	The Deregulation Act 2015, the Small Business, Enterprise and Employment Act 2015 and the Insolvency (Amendment) Act (Northern Ireland) 2016 (Consequential Amendments and Transitional Provisions) Regulations 2017

== 401–500 ==
Number	Title
401	The Deregulation Act 2015 (Birmingham City Council Act 1985) (Repeal) Regulations 2017
402	The Town and Country Planning (Permission in Principle) Order 2017
403	The Town and Country Planning (Brownfield Land Register) Regulations 2017
404	The Pollution Prevention and Control (Fees) (Miscellaneous Amendments) Regulations 2017
405	The Transfer for Determination of an Application for International Protection (Detention) (Significant Risk of Absconding Criteria) Regulations 2017
406	The Tax Credits and Guardian's Allowance Up-rating etc. Regulations 2017
407	The Water Environment (Water Framework Directive) (England and Wales) Regulations 2017
408	The National Health Service (Charges for Drugs and Appliances and Dental Charges) (Amendment) Regulations 2017
409	The Tobacco Products and Herbal Products for Smoking (Fees) Regulations 2017
410	The Bereavement Support Payment Regulations 2017
411	The Licensing Act 2003 (Miscellaneous Amendments) Regulations 2017
412	The Guardian's Allowance Up-rating Regulations 2017
413 (L. 6)	The Family Procedure (Amendment) Rules 2017
414	The Income Tax (Pay As You Earn) (Amendment) Regulations 2017
415	The Social Security (Contributions) (Rates, Limits and Thresholds Amendments and National Insurance Funds Payments) Regulations 2017
416	The Social Security (Contributions) (Re-rating) Consequential Amendment Regulations 2017
417	The Pensions Increase (Review) Order 2017
418	The Pensions Increase (Modification) Regulations 2017
419	Not Allocated
420	The Immigration (Health Charge) (Amendment) Order 2017
421 (W. 89)	The Smoke Control Areas (Authorised Fuels) (Wales) Regulations 2017
422	The Pensions Act 2014 (Consequential, Supplementary and Incidental Amendments) Order 2017
423 (W. 90)	The Smoke Control Areas (Exempted Classes of Fireplace) (Wales) Order 2017
424	The National Health Service Trusts (Trust Funds: Appointment of Trustees) (Revocation) and the NHS Foundation Trusts (Trust Funds: Appointment of Trustees) (Amendment) Order 2017
425	The Limited Liability Partnerships (Reporting on Payment Practices and Performance) Regulations 2017
426	The Oil and Gas Authority (Fees and Petroleum Licensing) (Amendment) Regulations 2017
427	The Universal Credit (Tenant Incentive Scheme) Amendment Regulations 2017
428	The Gas and Electricity (Consumer Complaints Handling Standards) (Amendment) Regulations 2017
429 (W. 91)	The A4076 Trunk Road (Steynton Road, Milford Haven, Pembrokeshire) (Part-time 20 mph Speed Limit) Order 2017
430	The Liverpool City Region Combined Authority (Functions and Amendment) Order 2017
431	The Tees Valley Combined Authority (Functions and Amendment) Order 2017
432	The Barnsley, Doncaster, Rotherham and Sheffield Combined Authority (Election of Mayor) (Amendment) Order 2017
433	The Keuper Underground Gas Storage Facility Order 2017
434 (W. 92)	The A55 Trunk Road (Eastbound Carriageway between Junction 31 (Caerwys) & Junction 32a (Billy Jeans), Flintshire) (Temporary Prohibition of Vehicles, Cyclists & Pedestrians) Order 2017
435 (W. 93)	The A483 Trunk Road (Rhosmaen Street & Bridge Street, Llandeilo, Carmarthenshire) (Various Waiting Restrictions) Order 2017
436 (W. 94)	The A458 Trunk Road (Llanfair Caereinion, Powys) (30 mph & Part-time 20 mph Speed Limits) Order 2017
437	The Mesothelioma Lump Sum Payments (Conditions and Amounts) (Amendment) Regulations 2017
438	The Sovereign Grant Act 2011 (Change of Percentage) Order 2017
439	Not Allocated
440	The Immigration and Nationality (Fees) (Amendment) Order 2017
441	The Postal Administration (Scotland) (Amendment) Rules 2017
442	The Pneumoconiosis etc. (Workers’ Compensation) (Payment of Claims) (Amendment) Regulations 2017
443	The Investment Bank (Amendment of Definition) and Special Administration (Amendment) Regulations 2017
444	The Scotland Act 2016 (Transitional) Regulations 2017
445	The National Health Service (Mandate Requirements) Regulations 2017
446	The Scottish Infected Blood Support Scheme (Application of Sections 731, 733 and 734 of the Income Tax (Trading and Other Income) Act 2005) Order 2017
447	The Water Industry Designated Codes (Appeals to the Competition and Markets Authority) Regulations 2017
448 (W. 95)	The A5 Trunk Road (Capel Curig, Conwy County Borough) (40 mph Speed Limit) Order 2017
449	The Water Supply Licence and Sewerage Licence (Modification of Standard Conditions) Order 2017
450	Not Allocated
451 (C. 39)	The Serious Crime Act 2015 (Commencement No. 6) Regulations 2017
452	The Air Weapons and Licensing (Scotland) Act 2015 (Consequential Provisions) Order 2017
453 (W. 96)	The Bathing Water (Amendment) (Wales) Regulations 2017
454	The Corporation Tax (Treatment of Unrelieved Surplus Advance Corporation Tax) (Amendment) Regulations 2017
455 (C. 40)	The Scotland Act 2016 (Commencement No. 5) Regulations 2017
456	The Financial Services and Markets Act 2000 and the Financial Services (Banking Reform) Act 2013 (Disclosure of Confidential Information) (Amendment) Regulations 2017
457	The National Health Service (Charges for Drugs and Appliances) (Amendment) (No. 2) Regulations 2017
458	The Offshore Installations (Safety Zones) (No. 2) Order 2017
459 (W. 97)	The Size and Composition of Local Planning Authority Committees (Wales) Regulations 2017
460 (W. 98)	The Local Authorities (Standing Orders) (Wales) (Amendment) Regulations 2017
461	The Childcare (Provision of Information About Young Children) (England) (Amendment) Regulations 2017
462 (C. 41)	The Water Act 2014 (Commencement No. 9 and Transitional Provisions) Order 2017
463	The Nuclear Industries Security (Amendment) Regulations 2017
464	The Hornsea One Offshore Wind Farm (Amendment) Order 2017
465	The National Minimum Wage (Amendment) Regulations 2017
466	The Individual Savings Account (Amendment No. 2) Regulations 2017
467	The Triton Knoll Electrical System (Correction) Order 2017
468	The Scotland Act 2016 (Income Tax Consequential Amendments) Regulations 2017
469	The Greater Manchester Combined Authority (Fire and Rescue Functions) Order 2017
470	The Greater Manchester Combined Authority (Transfer of Police and Crime Commissioner Functions to the Mayor) Order 2017
471	The Non-Domestic Rating (Designated Areas etc.) (Amendment) Regulations 2017
472	The Town and Country Planning (Blight Provisions) (England) Order 2017
473 (C. 42)	The Enterprise Act 2016 (Commencement No. 4 and Appointed Start Date) Regulations 2017
474	The European Political Parties and European Political Foundations Regulations 2017
475	The Chichester (Electoral Changes) Order 2017
476 (W. 99)	The Local Inquiries and Qualifying Procedures (Standard Daily Amount) (Wales) Regulations 2017
477	The Harrogate (Electoral Changes) Order 2017
478	The United Nations and European Union Financial Sanctions (Linking) Regulations 2017
479	The South Cambridgeshire (Electoral Changes) Order 2017
480	The South Cambridgeshire (Electoral Changes) Order 2017
481	The London Borough of Bexley (Electoral Changes) Order 2017
482 (C. 43)	The Policing and Crime Act 2017 (Commencement No. 2) Regulations 2017
483 (C. 44)	The Welfare Reform Act 2012 (Commencement No. 9 and 21 and Transitional and Transitory Provisions (Amendment)) Order 2017
484 (W. 100)	The A470 Trunk Road (Rhayader, Powys) (Temporary Prohibition of Vehicles) Order 2017
485	The Industrial Training Levy (Engineering Construction Industry Training Board) Order 2017
486 (W. 101)	The A470 and A494 Trunk Roads (Dolgellau By-Pass, Gwynedd) (De-Restricted Road and 50 mph and 30 mph Speed Limits) Order 2017
487	The School Governance (Constitution and Federations) (England) (Amendment) Regulations 2017
488	The Financial Services and Markets Act 2000 (Regulated Activities) (Amendment) Order 2017
489 (W. 102)	The Cancellation of Student Loans for Living Costs Liability (Wales) Regulations 2017
490	The Electricity and Gas (Energy Company Obligation) (Amendment) Order 2017
491 (W. 103)	The Partnership Arrangements (Wales) (Amendment) Regulations 2017
492	Not Allocated
493	The Electricity and Gas (Internal Markets) Regulations 2017
494 (C. 45)	The Finance Act 2015, Section 54(3) (Appointed Day) Regulations 2017
495	The Enactment of Extra-Statutory Concessions Order 2017
496	The Non-Domestic Rating (Rates Retention) and (Levy and Safety Net) (Amendment) Regulations 2017
497	The Taxes (Base Erosion and Profit Shifting) (Country-by-Country Reporting) (Amendment) Regulations 2017
498	The Air Navigation (Restriction of Flying) (Westminster Bridge, London) (Emergency) Regulations 2017
499	The Immigration Skills Charge Regulations 2017
500	The Financial Services and Markets Act 2000 (Regulated Activities) (Amendment) (No. 2) Order 2017

== 501–600 ==
Number	Title
501	The North Wales Wind Farms Connection (Correction) Order 2017
502	The Electricity Supplier Payments (Amendment) Regulations 2017
503	The Public Guardian (Fees, etc.) (Amendment) Regulations 2017
504 (C. 46) (W. 104)	The Environment (Wales) Act 2016 (Commencement No. 2) Order 2017
505	The Local Authorities (Public Health Functions and Entry to Premises by Local Healthwatch Representatives) (Amendment) Regulations 2017
506	The Water Act 2014 (Consequential Amendments etc.) Order 2017
507	The Prescribed Persons (Reports on Disclosures of Information) Regulations 2017
508	The Judicial Pensions (Amendment) Regulations 2017
509 (W. 105)	The Marine Licensing (Notices Appeals) (Wales) (Amendment) Regulations 2017
510	The West Midlands Combined Authority (Functions and Amendment) Order 2017
511 (C. 47)	The Serious Crime Act 2015 (Commencement No. 7) Regulations 2017
512	The Judicial Pensions (Additional Voluntary Contributions) Regulations 2017
513	The Public Sector Apprenticeship Targets Regulations 2017
514	The Legislative Reform (Private Fund Limited Partnerships) Order 2017
515	The Immigration and Nationality (Fees) Regulations 2017
516	The Statutory Auditors and Third Country Auditors Regulations 2017
517 (W. 106)	The A470 Trunk Road (Newbridge-on-Wye, Powys) (Temporary Part-time 20 mph Speed Limit) Order 2017
518 (W. 107)	The A470 Trunk Road (Llanrwst, Conwy) (Temporary Prohibition of Vehicles, Cyclists and Pedestrians) Order 2017
519 (W. 108)	The A5 Trunk Road (Chirk Bypass, Wrexham County Borough) (Temporary Prohibition of Vehicles & Cyclists) Order 2017
520	The Police and Criminal Evidence Act 1984 (Application to Labour Abuse Prevention Officers) Regulations 2017
521	The Gangmasters and Labour Abuse Authority (Complaints and Misconduct) Regulations 2017
522	The Judicial Pensions (Fee-Paid Judges) Regulations 2017
523 (W. 109)	The Education (Postgraduate Master's Degree Loans) (Wales) Regulations 2017
524	The Crown Estate Transfer Scheme 2017
525 (C. 48)	The Legal Aid, Sentencing and Punishment of Offenders Act 2012 (Alcohol Abstinence and Monitoring Requirements) Piloting Order 2017
526	The Air Navigation (Restriction of Flying) (Westminster Bridge, London) (Emergency) (Revocation) Regulations 2017
527 (W. 110)	The A5 Trunk Road (Halton Roundabout to Whitehurst Roundabout, Chirk, Wrexham County Borough) (Temporary Prohibition of Vehicles) Order 2017
528 (W. 111)	The Town and Country Planning (Fees for Applications, Deemed Applications and Site Visits) (Wales) (Amendment) Regulations 2017
529 (W. 112)	The Planning (Hazardous Substances) (Determination of Procedure) (Wales) Order 2017
530 (W. 113)	The Town and Country Planning (Enforcement Notices and Appeals) (Wales) Regulations 2017
531 (W. 114)	The A483 Trunk Road (Newbridge Bypass, Wrexham County Borough) (Temporary Prohibition of Vehicles) Order 2017
532	The Air Navigation (Restriction of Flying) (Rhinog Fawr) (Emergency) Regulations 2017
533 (W. 115)	The A489 Trunk Road (Newtown Road, Machynlleth, Powys) (30 mph & Part-time 20 mph Speed Limits) Order 2017
534 (W. 116)	The A55 Trunk Road (Junction 11 (Llys y Gwynt Interchange), Bangor, Gwynedd to the Wales/England Border) and The A494/A550 Trunk Road (Ewloe Interchange, Flintshire) (Temporary Speed Limits & Prohibition of Vehicles) Order 2017
535 (W. 117)	The A483 Trunk Road (Junction 1 (Ruabon Interchange) to the Wales/England Border, Wrexham County Borough) (Temporary Traffic Prohibitions and Restrictions) Order 2017
536	The Local Authorities (Capital Finance and Accounting) (England) (Amendment) Regulations 2017
537 (L. 7)	The Criminal Justice Act 2003 (Alcohol Abstinence and Monitoring Requirement) (Prescription of Arrangement for Monitoring) Order 2017
538 (W. 118)	The M4 Motorway (Slip Roads between Junction 23a (Magor), Monmouthshire and Junction 28 (Tredegar Park), Newport) (Temporary Prohibition of Vehicles) Order 2017
539 (W. 119)	The A55 Trunk Road (Eastbound Carriageway from Junction 14 (Madryn), Gwynedd to Junction 15 (Llanfairfechan), Conwy) (Temporary Traffic Prohibitions & Restriction) Order 2017
540	The Deregulation Act 2015 and Small Business, Enterprise and Employment Act 2015 (Consequential Amendments) (Savings) Regulations 2017
541	The Air Navigation (Restriction of Flying) (Rhinog Fawr) (Emergency) (Amendment) Regulations 2017
542 (W. 120)	The Town and Country Planning (Development Management Procedure) (Wales) (Amendment) Order 2017
543	The Merchant Shipping (Light Dues) (Amendment) Regulations 2017
544 (W. 121)	The Town and Country Planning (Referred Applications and Appeals Procedure) (Wales) Regulations 2017
545 (W. 122)	The Planning (Listed Buildings and Conservation Areas) (Wales) (Amendment) Regulations 2017
546 (W. 123) (C. 49)	The Planning (Wales) Act 2015 (Commencement No. 4 and Transitional Provisions) Order 2017
547 (W. 124)	The Planning (Hazardous Substances) (Wales) (Amendment) Regulations 2017
548 (W. 125)	The Town and Country Planning (Trees) (Amendment) (Wales) Regulations 2017
549	The Air Navigation (Restriction of Flying) (Rhinog Fawr) (Emergency) (No. 2) (Amendment) Regulations 2017
550	The Air Navigation (Restriction of Flying) (Rhinog Fawr) (Emergency) (Revocation) Regulations 2017
551	The Air Navigation (Restriction of Flying) (Rhinog Fawr) (Emergency) (No. 2) (Revocation) Regulations 2017
552 (W. 126)	The A483 Trunk Road (Ffairfach Level Crossing, Ffairfach, Carmarthenshire) (Temporary Prohibition of Vehicles) Order 2017
553 (W. 127)	The Town and Country Planning (Control of Advertisements) (Amendment) (Wales) Regulations 2017
554	The Road Vehicles (Registration and Licensing) (Amendment) Regulations 2017
555	The Care and Support (Charging and Assessment of Resources) (Amendment) Regulations 2017
556	The Democratic People's Republic of Korea (European Union Financial Sanctions) (Amendment) Regulations 2017
557 (W. 128) (C. 50)	The Revised Code of Practice on the exercise of social services functions in relation to Part 4 (direct payments and choice of accommodation) and Part 5 (charging and financial assessment) of the Social Services and Well-being (Wales) Act 2014 (Appointed Day) (Wales) Order 2017
558	The Weymouth Port Health Authority Order 2017
559 (W. 129)	The A487 Trunk Road (Bontnewydd, Gwynedd) (Part-time 20 mph Speed Limit) Order 2017
560	The European Union Financial Sanctions (Enhanced Penalties) Regulations 2017
561 (W. 130)	The A494 Trunk Road (Eastbound Footway between Old Aston Hill Junction and Plough Lane Junction, Deeside, Flintshire) (Temporary Closure) Order 2017
562 (W. 131)	The A483 Trunk Road (Cilyrychen Level Crossing, Llandybie, Carmarthenshire) (Temporary Prohibition of Vehicles) Order 2017
563 (W. 132)	The A494 Trunk Road (Mold Bypass, Flintshire) (Temporary Prohibition of Vehicles & Cyclists) Order 2017
564 (C. 51) (W. 133)	The Commons Act 2006 (Commencement No. 4) (Wales) Order 2017
565 (W. 134)	The Environmental Impact Assessment (Agriculture) (Wales) Regulations 2017
566 (W. 135)	The Commons Act 2006 (Correction, Non-Registration or Mistaken Registration) (Wales) Regulations 2017
567 (W. 136)	The Town and Country Planning (Environmental Impact Assessment) (Wales) Regulations 2017
568	The British Nationality (Maldives) Order 2017 (revoked)
569	The Armed Forces Act (Continuation) Order 2017
570	The Collection of Fines etc. (Northern Ireland Consequential Amendments) Order 2017
571	The Town and Country Planning (Environmental Impact Assessment) Regulations 2017
572	The Infrastructure Planning (Environmental Impact Assessment) Regulations 2017
573	The Sexual Offences Act 2003 (Prescribed Police Stations) Regulations 2017
574	The Civil Courts (Amendment) Order 2017
575	The Police (Complaints and Misconduct) (Amendment) Regulations 2017
576	The Prison (Amendment) Rules 2017
577	The Goods Vehicles (Licensing of Operators) (Temporary Use in Great Britain) (Amendment) Regulations 2017
578 (C. 52)	The Childcare Payments Act 2014 (Commencement No. 3 and Transitional Provisions) Regulations 2017
579	Not allocated
580	The Electricity Works (Environmental Impact Assessment) (England and Wales) Regulations 2017
581	The Employment and Support Allowance (Miscellaneous Amendments and Transitional and Savings Provision) Regulations 2017
582	The Offshore Petroleum Production and Pipe-lines (Environmental Impact Assessment and other Miscellaneous Provisions) (Amendment) Regulations 2017
583	The Water Resources (Environmental Impact Assessment) (England and Wales) (Amendment) Regulations 2017
584 (C. 53)	The Welfare Reform Act 2012 (Commencement No. 19, 22, 23 and 24 and Transitional and Transitory Provisions (Modification)) Order 2017
585	The Environmental Impact Assessment (Land Drainage Improvement Works) (Amendment) Regulations 2017
586	Not allocated
587	Not allocated
588	The Marine Works (Environmental Impact Assessment) (Amendment) Regulations 2017
589	The Horserace Betting Levy Regulations 2017
590 (W. 137)	The A40 Trunk Road (St Clears, Carmarthenshire to Haverfordwest, Pembrokeshire) (Temporary Speed Restrictions & No Overtaking) Order 2017
591 (W. 138)	The A40 Trunk Road (Scotchwell Roundabout to Rudbaxton Junction, Haverfordwest, Pembrokeshire) (Temporary Speed Restrictions & No Overtaking) Order 2017
592	The Environmental Impact Assessment (Forestry) (England and Wales) (Amendment) Regulations 2017
593	The Environmental Impact Assessment (Agriculture) (England) (No. 2) (Amendment) Regulations 2017
594	The Education (Postgraduate Master's Degree Loans) (Amendment) Regulations 2017
595	The Marketing of Fruit Plant and Propagating Material (England) Regulations 2017
596 (W. 139)	The Seed Potatoes (Wales) (Amendment) Regulations 2017
597	The Tax Credits (Claims and Notifications) (Amendment) Regulations 2017
598	The International Tax Compliance (Amendment) Regulations 2017
599	The Single Common Market Organisation (Emergency Aid) (England and Northern Ireland) Regulations 2017
600	The Contracting-out (Transfer and Transfer Payment) (Amendment) Regulations 2017

== 601–700 ==
Number	Title
601	The Folkestone Harbour Revision Order 2017
602	The Scotland Act 2016 (Consequential and Saving Provisions) Regulations 2017
603	The Transport Levying Bodies (Amendment) Regulations 2017
604	The Representation of the People (Scotland) (Amendment) Regulations 2017
605	The Electoral Registration Pilot Scheme (Scotland) Order 2017
606	The Electoral Registration Pilot Scheme (England) (Amendment) Order 2017
607	The Child Benefit (General) (Amendment) Regulations 2017
608 (C. 54)	The Scotland Act 2016 (Commencement No. 6) Regulations 2017
609	The London Borough of Redbridge (Electoral Changes) Order 2017
610	The Electoral Registration Pilot Scheme (England and Wales) Order 2017
611	The Combined Authorities (Finance) Order 2017
612	The Greater Manchester Combined Authority (Functions and Amendment) Order 2017
613	The Social Security (Miscellaneous Amendments No. 3) Regulations 2017
614	The Major Sporting Events (Income Tax Exemption) Regulations 2017
615	The Proscribed Organisations (Name Change) Order 2017
616 (W. 140)	The A465 Trunk Road & M4 Motorway (Llandarcy Interchange and Approaches, Neath Port Talbot) (Temporary 50 mph and 40 mph Speed Limits) Order 2017
617	The Immigration Act 2016 (Consequential Amendments) (Biometrics and Legal Aid) Regulations 2017
618	The Designation of Schools Having a Religious Character (England) Order 2017
619	The Town and Country Planning (General Permitted Development) (England) (Amendment) (No. 2) Order 2017
620	The Town and Country Planning (Compensation) (England) (Amendment) (No. 2) Regulations 2017
621	The Air Navigation (Restriction of Flying) (Cardiff) Regulations 2017
622	The Air Navigation (Restriction of Flying) (Weston-Super-Mare) (No. 2) Regulations 2017
623	The Air Navigation (Restriction of Flying) (Her Majesty The Queen's Birthday Flypast) Regulations 2017
624	The Air Navigation (Restriction of Flying) (East Fortune) Regulations 2017
625	The Air Navigation (Restriction of Flying) (Bolesworth Castle) (No. 2) Regulations 2017
626	The Air Navigation (Restriction of Flying) (Hylands Park) Regulations 2017
627	The Air Navigation (Restriction of Flying) (Weston Park) Regulations 2017
628	The Specified Agreement on Driving Disqualifications Regulations 2017
629 (W. 141)	The A470 Trunk Road (Dolgellau By-Pass, Gwynedd) (50 mph Speed Limit) Order 2017
630 (W. 142)	The A477 Trunk Road (Carew Roundabout, East of Milton to Waterloo Roundabout, Pembroke Dock, Pembrokeshire) (Temporary Speed Restrictions & No Overtaking) Order 2017
631	The Misuse of Drugs (Amendment) (England, Wales and Scotland) Regulations 2017
632	The Misuse of Drugs (Designation) (Amendment) (England, Wales and Scotland) Order 2017
633 (C. 55) (W. 143)	The Historic Environment (Wales) Act 2016 (Commencement No. 1 and Transitional Provisions) Order 2017
634	The Misuse of Drugs Act 1971 (Amendment) Order 2017
635	The Air Navigation (Restriction of Flying) (Wycombe Air Park) Regulations 2017
636	The Air Navigation (Restriction of Flying) (Jet Formation Display Teams) Regulations 2017
637	The Parliamentary Elections (Returning Officers’ Charges) Order 2017
638 (W. 144)	The Planning (Listed Buildings and Conservation Areas) (Wales) (Amendment No. 2) Regulations 2017
639 (W. 145)	The A4042 Trunk Road (Grove Park Roundabout, Newport to Croes-y-Mwyalch Roundabout, Torfaen) (Temporary Speed Restrictions & No Overtaking) Order 2017
640 (W. 146)	The Listed Buildings (Urgent Works) (Interest Rate on Expenses) (Wales) Order 2017
641 (W. 147)	The Ancient Monuments (Claims for Compensation) (Wales) Regulations 2017
642 (W. 148)	The Ancient Monuments (Applications for Scheduled Monument Consent) (Wales) Regulations 2017
643 (W. 149)	The Scheduled Monuments (Review of Scheduling Decisions) (Wales) Regulations 2017≠
644 (W. 150)	Listed Buildings (Review of Listing Decisions) (Wales) Regulations 2017
645	The Air Navigation (Restriction of Flying) (Overton) Regulations 2017
646	The Air Navigation (Restriction of Flying) (Royal International Air Tattoo, RAF Fairford) Regulations 2017
647	The Air Navigation (Restriction of Flying) (Silverstone and Turweston) (No. 2) Regulations 2017
648 (W. 151)	The A40 Trunk Road (Cwmifor to Manordeilo, Carmarthenshire) (50 mph Speed Limit) Order 2017
649	The M48 Motorway (Severn Bridge High Winds) (Temporary Prohibition of Traffic) Order 2017
650	The Air Navigation (Restriction of Flying) (The Palace of Holyroodhouse) Regulations 2017
651	The Air Navigation (Restriction of Flying) (Jet Formation Display Teams) (Amendment) Regulations 2017
652	The Parliamentary Elections (Returning Officer's Charges) (Northern Ireland) Order 2017
653	Not Allocated
654	The Air Navigation (Restriction of Flying) (Cardiff) (Amendment) Regulations 2017
655	The Common Agricultural Policy (Control and Enforcement, Cross-Compliance, Scrutiny of Transactions and Appeals) (Amendment) (England) Regulations 2017
656	The M6 Toll Motorway (Junction T3) (Warwickshire) (Temporary Prohibition of Traffic) Order 2017
657	The M6 Toll Motorway (Junctions T4 to Junction T6) (Temporary Prohibition of Traffic) Order 2017
658	The M6 Toll Motorway (M6 Junction 3a) (Warwickshire) (Temporary Prohibition of Traffic) Order 2017
659	The Thames Water Utilities Limited (Thames Tideway Tunnel) (Amendment) Order 2017
660	The M6 Toll Motorway (M6 Junction 11a to Junction T7) (Staffordshire) (Temporary Prohibition of Traffic) Order 2017
661 (W. 152)	The M4 Motorway (Junction 48 (Hendy) to Junction 49 (Pont Abraham), Carmarthenshire) (Temporary Prohibition of Vehicles & 50 MPH Speed Limit) Order 2017
662	The Air Navigation (Restriction of Flying) (Enniskillen) Regulations 2017
663	The Air Navigation (Restriction of Flying) (Bucklebury) Regulations 2017
664 (C. 56)	The Welfare Reform Act 2012 (Commencement No. 29 and Commencement No. 17, 19, 22, 23 and 24 and Transitional and Transitory Provisions (Modification)) Order 2017
665	The Air Navigation (Restriction of Flying) (Manchester Arena) (Emergency) Regulations 2017
666	The Air Navigation (Restriction of Flying) (Silverstone and Turweston) (No. 3) Regulations 2017
667	The M6 Toll Motorway (Junction T3) (Temporary Prohibition of Traffic) Order 2017
668	The M6 Toll Motorway (Junction T3) (Slip Roads) (Warwickshire) (Temporary Restriction and Prohibition of Traffic) Order 2017
669	The Wireless Telegraphy (Mobile Communication Services on Aircraft) (Exemption) Regulations 2017
670 (W. 153)	The A483 and A458 Trunk Roads (Welshpool, Powys) (Temporary Prohibition and Restriction of Vehicles and Pedestrians) Order 2017
671	The Parliamentary Elections (Returning Officers’ Charges) (No. 2) Order 2017
672 (W. 154)	The A48 Trunk Road (East of Pensarn Roundabout, Carmarthen, Carmarthenshire) (Temporary Speed Restrictions & No Overtaking) Order 2017
673 (W. 155)	The A44 Trunk Road (Lovesgrove, Aberystwyth, Ceredigion) (Temporary 40 mph Speed Limit & No Overtaking) Order 2017
674 (W. 156)	The Disease Control (Wales) (Amendment) Order 2017
675 (W. 157)	The A5 Trunk Road (Cerrigydrudion to Glasfryn, Conwy County Borough) (Temporary Speed Restrictions & No Overtaking) Order 2017
676 (W. 158)	The A487 Trunk Road (Penmorfa to Bryncir, Gwynedd) (Temporary Speed Restrictions & No Overtaking) Order 2017
677 (W. 159)	The Disease Control (Wales) (Amendment) (Amendment) Order 2017
678 (W. 160)	The A40 Trunk Road (Park Road, Abergavenny, Monmouthshire) (Temporary Closure of Footway) Order 2017
679 (W. 161)	The A4042 Trunk Road (Little Mill, West of Usk, Monmouthshire) (Temporary Prohibition of Left and Right Hand Turns) Order 2017
680	The Air Navigation (Restriction of Flying) (Manchester Arena) (Emergency) (Amendment) Regulations 2017
681	The Air Navigation (Restriction of Flying) (Borough Market, London) (Emergency) Regulations 2017
682	The Air Navigation (Restriction of Flying) (Borough Market, London) (Emergency) (Revocation) Regulations 2017
683	The Air Navigation (Restriction of Flying) (Manchester Arena) (Emergency) (Revocation) Regulations 2017
684 (W. 162)	The M4 Motorway (Westbound between Junction 23a (Magor), Monmouthshire and Junction 33 (Cardiff West), Cardiff) and A48(M) Motorway (Westbound) (Temporary 50 mph Speed Limit) Order 2017
685	The Air Navigation (Restriction of Flying) (Herne Bay) Regulations 2017
686	The Air Navigation (Restriction of Flying) (Biggin Hill) Regulations 2017
687	The Air Navigation (Restriction of Flying) (Bournemouth) Regulations 2017
688	The Air Navigation (Restriction of Flying) (State Opening of Parliament) Regulations 2017
689	The Social Security (Emergency Funds) (Amendment) Regulations 2017
690	The Inspectors of Education, Children's Services and Skills (No. 2) Order 2017
691 (W. 163)	The Marketing of Fruit Plant and Propagating Material (Wales) Regulations 2017
692	The Money Laundering, Terrorist Financing and Transfer of Funds (Information on the Payer) Regulations 2017
693	The Information about People with Significant Control (Amendment) Regulations 2017
694	The Scottish Partnerships (Register of People with Significant Control) Regulations 2017
695	The Air Navigation (Restriction of Flying) (Notting Hill, London) (Emergency) Regulations 2017
696	The Air Navigation (Restriction of Flying) (Notting Hill, London) (Emergency) (Amendment) Regulations 2017
697	The Export Control (Amendment) (No. 3) Order 2017
698 (W. 164)	The Allocation of Housing and Homelessness (Eligibility) (Wales) (Amendment) Regulations 2017
699	The Data Reporting Services Regulations 2017
700	The A487 Trunk Road (Porthmadog, Minffordd & Tremadog Bypass, Gwynedd) (30 mph and 40 mph Speed Limits) Order 2017

== 701–800 ==
Number	Title
701	Financial Services and Markets Act 2000 (Markets in Financial Instruments) Regulations 2017
702	Insolvency Amendment (EU 2015/848) Regulations 2017
703	Nursing and Midwifery Order (Legal Assessors) (Amendment) and the Nursing and Midwifery Council (Fitness to Practise) (Amendment) Rules Order of Council 2017
704 (W. 166)	A55 Trunk Road (Junction 1 (Kingsland Roundabout), Holyhead, Isle of Anglesey to east of Junction 11 (Llys y Gwynt Interchange), Bangor, Gwynedd) (Temporary Traffic Restrictions & Prohibition) Order 2017
705	Equality Act 2010 (General Qualifications Bodies) (Appropriate Regulator and Relevant Qualifications) (Amendment) (England) Regulations 2017
706	Antarctic (Amendment) Regulations 2017
707	Diocese of Gloucester (Educational Endowments) (Saul Church of England Primary School) Order 2017
708	Diocese of Canterbury (Educational Endowments) (Capel-le-Ferne Primary School) Order 2017
709	National Health Service (Pharmaceutical and Local Pharmaceutical Services) (Amendment) Regulations 2017
710 (W. 167)	Education (School Inspection) (Wales) (Amendment) Regulations 2017
711 (W. 168)	Tuberculosis (Wales) (Amendment) Order 2017
712 (W. 169)	Education (Postgraduate Master's Degree Loans) (Wales) (Amendment) Regulations 2017
713 (W. 170)	Care Planning and Case Review (Miscellaneous Amendments) (Wales) Regulations 2017
714 (W. 171)	Environment (Wales) Act 2016 (Commencement No. 3) Order 2017
715	Human Medicines (Amendment) Regulations 2017
716 (W. 172)	M4 Motorway (Junction 24 (Coldra) to Junction 28 (Tredegar Park), Newport) (Temporary Prohibition of Vehicles & 40 mph Speed Limit) Order 2017
717	Pension Schemes Act 2015 (Transitional Provisions and Appropriate Independent Advice) (Amendment) Regulations 2017
718	South Tees Development Corporation (Establishment) Order 2017
719 (W. 173)	A465 Trunk Road (Llangua to Hardwick Roundabout, Abergavenny, Monmouthshire) (Temporary Speed Restrictions & No Overtaking) Order 2017
720	Offshore Installations (Safety Zones) (No. 3) Order 2017
721	Not Alloated
722	First-tier Tribunal and Upper Tribunal (Chambers) (Amendment) Order 2017
723 (L. 8)	Tribunal Procedure (Amendment) Rules 2017
724 (W. 174)	School Milk (Wales) Regulations 2017
725	Loans for Mortgage Interest Regulations 2017
726 (C. 57)	Policing and Crime Act 2017 (Commencement No. 3 and Transitional and Saving Provisions) Regulations 2017
727	Renewable Heat Incentive Scheme and Domestic Renewable Heat Incentive Scheme (Amendment) Regulations 2017
728	Coroners and Justice Act 2009 (Alteration of Coroner Areas) Order 2017
729	Not Allocated
730	Criminal Justice (European Investigation Order) Regulations 2017
731	Electricity (Exemptions from the Requirement for a Generation Licence) Order 2017
732 (W. 175)	A5 Trunk Road (West of Llangollen, Denbighshire) (Temporary Speed Restrictions and No Overtaking) Order 2017
733 (W. 176)	A489 Trunk Road (Newtown to Caersws, Powys) (Temporary Speed Restrictions & No Overtaking) Order 2017
734	Milk and Milk Products (Pupils in Educational Establishments) (England and Northern Ireland) Regulations 2017
735 (W. 177)	A44 Trunk Road (Llangurig, Powys to Aberystwyth, Ceredigion) (Temporary Speed Restrictions & No Overtaking) Order 2017
736	Police and Criminal Evidence Act 1984 (Application to Revenue and Customs) (Amendment) Order 2017
737	Recreational Craft Regulations 2017
738 (W. 178)	A5 Trunk Road (Chirk Bypass, Wrexham County Borough) (Temporary 50 mph Speed Limit & No Overtaking) Order 2017
739 (C. 58)	Criminal Finances Act 2017 (Commencement No. 1) Regulations 2017
740	Capital Allowances Act 2001 (Cars Emissions) (Amendment) Order 2017
741 (L. 9)	Family Procedure (Amendment No. 2) Rules 2017
742 (L. 10)	Justices’ Clerks and Assistants (Amendment) Rules 2017
743	Wireless Telegraphy (Mobile Communication Services on Ships) (Exemption) Regulations 2017
744	National Health Service (Quality Accounts) (Amendment) Regulations 2017
745	Civil Legal Aid (Financial Resources and Payment for Services) (Amendment) Regulations 2017
746	Wireless Telegraphy (Exemption and Amendment) (Amendment) Regulations 2017
747 (W. 179)	A470 Trunk Road (Coryton Interchange, Cardiff to Abercynon Roundabout, Rhondda Cynon Taf) (Temporary Traffic Prohibitions & Restrictions) Order 2017
748	Child Trust Funds (Amendment No. 2) Regulations 2017
749 (W. 180)	A55 Trunk Road (Conwy Tunnel, Conwy County Borough) (Temporary Traffic Prohibitions and Restrictions) (No.2) Order 2017
750 (C. 59)	Childcare Payments Act 2014 (Commencement No. 4) Regulations 2017
751	Criminal Justice Act 1988 (Reviews of Sentencing) (Amendment) Order 2017
752	Payment Services Regulations 2017
753	Electronic Communications Code (Conditions and Restrictions) (Amendment) Regulations 2017
754	European Union Financial Sanctions (Amendment of Information Provisions) Regulations 2017
755 (L. 11)	Criminal Procedure (Amendment No. 3) Rules 2017
756	National Health Service (Charges to Overseas Visitors) (Amendment) Regulations 2017
757	Air Navigation (Restriction of Flying) (Ayr) Regulations 2017
758	Air Navigation (Restriction of Flying) (Northampton Sywell) Regulations 2017
759	Air Navigation (Restriction of Flying) (Portrush) Regulations 2017
760	Jobseeker's Allowance (Hardship) (Amendment) Regulations 2017
761 (W. 181)	A5 Trunk Road (Halton Roundabout, Chirk, Wrexham County Borough to Llandygai Roundabout, Gwynedd) (Temporary Traffic Prohibitions) Order 2017
762 (W. 182)	A5 Trunk Road (Holyhead Road, Pentre Du, Betws-y-coed, Conwy County Borough) (Prohibition of Waiting) Order 2017
763 (W. 183)	A40 Trunk Road and Link Road (Travellers’ Rest Junction, Carmarthenshire) (Temporary Prohibition of Vehicles and 30 MPH Speed Limit) Order 2017
764 (W. 184)	A470 Trunk Road (Powys/Merthyr Tydfil County Boundary to Builth Wells, Powys) (Temporary Speed Restrictions & No Overtaking) Order 2017
765 (C. 60)	Digital Economy Act 2017 (Commencement No. 1) Regulations 2017
766	Wrexham Gas Fired Generating Station Order 2017
767 (C. 61)	Neighbourhood Planning Act 2017 (Commencement No. 1) Regulations 2017
768	Childcare (Fees) (Amendment) Regulations 2017
769	Home Loss Payments (Prescribed Amounts) (England) Regulations 2017
770 (W. 185)	A458 Trunk Road (East of Middletown to Nant-y-Dugoed, Powys) (Temporary Speed Restrictions & No Overtaking) Order 2017
771 (C. 62)	Intellectual Property (Unjustified Threats) Act 2017 (Commencement and Transitional Provisions) Regulations 2017
772 (W. 186)	M4 Motorway & A470 Trunk Road (Coryton Interchange, Cardiff to Cefn Coed Roundabout, Merthyr Tydfil) (Temporary Prohibition of Vehicles & Cyclists) Order 2017
773	Protection of Wrecks (Designation) (England) Order 2017
774	Occupational Pension Schemes (Charges and Governance) (Amendment) Regulations 2017
775	Child Abduction and Custody (Parties to Conventions) (Amendment) Order 2017
776	Fire and Rescue Services (Appointment of Inspector) (England) (Revocation) Order 2017
777	Falkland Islands Courts (Overseas Jurisdiction) (Amendment) Order 2017
778	Value Added Tax (Place of Supply of Services) (Telecommunication Services) Order 2017
779	Antarctic Act 1994 (Overseas Territories) (Amendment) Order 2017
780	Democratic People's Republic of Korea (Sanctions) (Overseas Territories) (Amendment) (No. 2) Order 2017
781	Tax Credits (Exercise of Functions in relation to Northern Ireland and Notices for Recovery of Tax Credit Overpayments) Order 2017
782 (W. 187)	A494 Trunk Road (Nant Clwyd, Denbighshire) (Temporary Speed Restrictions and No Overtaking) Order 2017
783	Charities (Shakespeare Birthplace Trust) Order 2017
784 (W. 188)	A483 Trunk Road (Newtown to Llanymynech, Powys) (Temporary Speed Restrictions & No Overtaking) Order 2017
785 (C. 63)	Childcare Act 2016 (Commencement No. 2) Regulations 2017
786	National Grid (Hinkley Point C Connection Project) (Correction) Order 2017
787	National Savings (Amendment) Regulations 2017
788 (C. 64)	Higher Education and Research Act 2017 (Commencement No. 1) Regulations 2017
789	Air Navigation (Restriction of Flying) (Plymouth) Regulations 2017
790	Air Navigation (Restriction of Flying) (Manchester Central Convention Complex) Regulations 2017
791	Air Navigation (Restriction of Flying) (Jet Formation Display Teams) (No. 2) Regulations 2017
792	Air Navigation (Restriction of Flying) (Southport) Regulations 2017
793	M60 Motorway (Junctions 8 to 18) and the M62 Motorway (Junctions 18 to 20) (Variable Speed Limits) Regulations 2017
794	Apprenticeships (Modifications to the Specification of Apprenticeship Standards for England) Order 2017
795	Diocese of Oxford (Educational Endowments) (Harpsden Church of England School) Order 2017
796	Ecclesiastical Judges, Legal Officers and Others (Fees) Order 2017
797	Legal Officers (Annual Fees) Order 2017
798	Justice and Security (Northern Ireland) Act 2007 (Extension of duration of non-jury trial provisions) Order 2017
799 (C. 65)	Immigration Act 2016 (Commencement No. 4) Regulations 2017
800	Air Navigation (Restriction of Flying) (Scampton) Regulations 2017

== 801–900 ==
Number	Title
801	The Payments to the Churches Conservation Trust Order 2017
802 (C. 66)	The Welfare Reform and Work Act 2016 (Commencement No. 5) Regulations 2017
803	Not Allocated
804	The Diocese of Lincoln (Educational Endowments) (Heckington Old Church of England School) Order 2017
805 (W. 189)	The A487 Trunk Road (Pentood, south of Cardigan, Ceredigion) (Temporary 30 mph Speed Limit & No Overtaking) Order 2017
806 (W. 190)	The A483 Trunk Road (Powys/Carmarthenshire Border to Llandrindod Wells, Powys) (Temporary Speed Restrictions & No Overtaking) Order 2017
807	The Education (Information About Children in Alternative Provision) (England) (Amendment) Regulations 2017
808	The M6 Toll Motorway (M6 Junction 11a to Junction T7) (Staffordshire) (Temporary Prohibition of Traffic) (No. 2) Order 2017
809 (C. 67)	The Health Service Medical Supplies (Costs) Act 2017 (Commencement No. 1 and Saving Provision) Regulations 2017
810 (C. 68)	The Health Act 1999 (Commencement No. 17) Order 2017
811	The School Teachers’ Pay and Conditions Order 2017
812 (W. 191)	The A487 Trunk Road (Llanfarian, Ceredigion) (40 mph & Part-time 20 mph Speed Limits) Order 2017
813	The Air Navigation (Restriction of Flying) (Stokes Bay) Regulations 2017
814 (W. 192)	The A4076 Trunk Road (Freemans Way, Haverfordwest, Pembrokeshire) (Temporary Speed Restrictions & No Overtaking) Order 2017
815	The Air Navigation (Restriction of Flying) (Hylands Park) (Amendment) Regulations 2017
816 (W. 193)	The A487 Trunk Road (Eglwyswrw, Crymych, Pembrokeshire) (30 mph & Part-Time 20 mph Speed Limits) Order 2017
817	The National Grid (Richborough Connection Project) Development Consent Order 2017
818 (W. 194)	The A470 Trunk Road (Builth Wells to Llangurig, Powys) (Temporary Speed Restrictions & No Overtaking) Order 2017
819 (W. 195)	The M4 Motorway (Slip Roads between Junction 38 (Margam) and Junction 43 (Llandarcy), Neath Port Talbot) (Temporary Prohibition of Vehicles) Order 2017
820	The Keuper Underground Gas Storage Facility (Correction) Order 2017
821 (W. 196)	The A487 Trunk Road (Aberaeron to Aberystwyth, Ceredigion) (Temporary Speed Restrictions and No Overtaking) Order 2017
822 (W. 197)	The A487 Trunk Road (Pembrokeshire/Ceredigion County Boundary, Near Cardigan to Aberaeron, Ceredigion) (Temporary Speed Restrictions and No Overtaking) Order 2017
823	Not Allocated
824 (W. 198)	The A40 Trunk Road (Glangrwyney to Pont Wen, Halfway, Powys) (Temporary Speed Restrictions and No Overtaking) Order 2017
825	Not Allocated
825	The Merchant Shipping (Monitoring, Reporting and Verification of Carbon Dioxide Emissions) and the Port State Control (Amendment) Regulations 2017
826	The East Anglia THREE Offshore Wind Farm Order 2017
827 (W. 199)	The Flood and Coastal Erosion Committee for Wales Regulations 2017
828 (W. 200)	The A487 Trunk Road (Aberystwyth, Ceredigion to the Powys/Gwynedd County Boundary at Dyfi Bridge, Powys) (Temporary Speed Restrictions and No Overtaking) Order 2017
829 (W. 201)	The A489 Trunk Road (Cemmaes Road to Machynlleth, Powys) (Temporary Speed Restrictions and No Overtaking) Order 2017
830	The London Overground (Barking Riverside Extension) Order 2017
831	The Repayment of Student Loans and Postgraduate Master's Degree Loans (Amendment) Regulations 2017
832 (W. 202)	The Materials and Articles in Contact with Food (Wales) (Amendment) Regulations 2017
833 (W. 203)	The A487 Trunk Road (Newport, Pembrokeshire to Pembrokeshire / Ceredigion Border) (Temporary Speed Restrictions and No Overtaking) Order 2017
834 (W. 204)	The A479 Trunk Road (Glanusk Park to Llyswen, Powys) (Temporary Speed Restrictions & No Overtaking) Order 2017
835	The Co-ordination of Regulatory Enforcement Regulations 2017
836 (W. 205)	The A487 Trunk Road (Penparc, Ceredigion) (40 mph & Part-time 20 mph Speed Limits) Order 2017
837	The Merchant Shipping (Ship-to-Ship Transfers) (Amendment) Regulations 2017
838	The Air Navigation (Restriction of Flying) (Portsmouth and the Solent) Regulations 2017
839	The Air Navigation (Restriction of Flying) (Notting Hill, London) (Emergency) (Revocation) Regulations 2017
840	The Air Navigation (Restriction of Flying) (Topcliffe) Regulations 2017
841	The Water Infrastructure Adoption (Prescribed Water Fittings Requirements) (England) Regulations 2017
842 (C. 69)	The Enterprise Act 2016 (Commencement No. 5) Regulations 2017
843	The Hinkley Point C (Nuclear Generating Station) (Amendment) Order 2017
844 (C. 70)	The Technical and Further Education Act 2017 (Commencement No. 1 and Transitional Provision) Regulations 2017
845	The Investigatory Powers Act 2016 (Consequential Amendments and Saving Provisions) Regulations 2017
846 (C. 71) (W. 206)	The Regulation and Inspection of Social Care (Wales) Act 2016 (Commencement No. 4) Order 2017
847	The Warm Home Discount (Reconciliation) (Amendment) Regulations 2017
848	The Caseins and Caseinates (England) Regulations 2017
849	The Goods Vehicles (Plating and Testing) (Miscellaneous Amendments) Regulations 2017
850	The Motor Vehicles (Tests) (Amendment) Regulations 2017
851	The Road Vehicles (Construction and Use) (Amendment) Regulations 2017
852	The Road Vehicles Lighting (Amendment) Regulations 2017
853 (W. 207)	The A4060 Trunk Road (Abercanaid Roundabout to Dowlais Top Roundabout, Merthyr Tydfil) (40 mph Speed Limit and Derestriction) Order 2017
854	The M48 Motorway (Severn Bridge) (Temporary Prohibition of Traffic) Order 2017
855	The Petroleum and Offshore Gas Storage and Unloading Licensing (Amendment) Regulations 2017
856	The Building (Amendment) Regulations 2017
857	The Renewable Heat Incentive Scheme and Domestic Renewable Heat Incentive Scheme (Amendment) (No. 2) Regulations 2017
858 (W. 208)	The A44 Trunk Road (Penweddig, Aberystwyth, Ceredigion) (Part-time 20 mph Speed Limit) Order 2017
859 (C. 72)	The Investigatory Powers Act 2016 (Commencement No. 3 and Transitory, Transitional and Saving Provisions) Regulations 2017
860 (W. 209)	The A487 Trunk Road (Penmorfa to Bryncir, Gwynedd) (Temporary Traffic Restriction & Prohibitions) Order 2017
861 (W. 210)	The A55 Trunk Road (Glan Conwy to Conwy Morfa, Conwy County Borough) (Temporary 70 mph Speed Limit) Order 2017
862 (W. 211)	The A483 Trunk Road (Llandrindod Wells to Newtown, Powys) (Temporary Speed Restrictions & No Overtaking) Order 2017
863	The Fire and Rescue Authority (Police and Crime Commissioner) (Application of Local Policing Provisions, Inspection, Powers to Trade and Consequential Amendments) Order 2017
864	The Police, Fire and Crime Commissioner for Essex (Fire and Rescue Authority) Order 2017
865	The Network Rail (Felixstowe Branch Line Land Acquisition) (Agreements for Transfer) Order 2017
866	The Designation of Schools Having a Religious Character (Independent Schools) (England) Order 2017
867 (W. 212)	The A494 Trunk Road (Bala, Gwynedd) (Temporary Prohibition of Vehicles) Order 2017
868	The Employers’ Duties (Miscellaneous Amendments) Regulations 2017
869 (W. 213)	The A483 & A489 Trunk Roads (Newtown, Powys) (Temporary Speed Restrictions & No Overtaking) Order 2017
870	The Social Security (Infected Blood and Thalidomide) Regulations 2017
871	The Valuation of Minor Intermediate Leasehold Interests (England) Regulations 2017
872	The Protection of Wrecks (Designation) (England) (No. 2) Order 2017
873	The Operation of Public Service Vehicles (Partnership) (Amendment) Regulations 2017
874	The Goods Vehicles (Licensing of Operators) (Amendment) Regulations 2017
875	Not Allocated
876	The Facilitation of Tax Evasion Offences (Guidance About Prevention) Regulations 2017
877	The Trade Union Ballots and Elections (Independent Scrutineer Qualifications) (Amendment) Order 2017
878	The Recognition and Derecognition Ballots (Qualified Persons) (Amendment) Order 2017
879	The Merchant Shipping (Registration of Ships) (Amendment) Regulations 2017
880	The Public Interest Disclosure (Prescribed Persons) (Amendment) Order 2017
881	The Road Vehicles (Authorised Weight) and (Construction and Use) (Amendment) Regulations 2017
882	The Tonnage Tax (Training Requirement) (Amendment etc.) Regulations 2017
883	The Democratic People's Republic of Korea (European Union Financial Sanctions) (Amendment) (No. 2) Regulations 2017
884	The M6 Toll Motorway (Junction T3 to South of T1) (Temporary Prohibition of Traffic) (No. 2) Order 2017
885	The Immigration and Nationality (Fees) (Amendment) Regulations 2017
886 (W. 214)	The Education (Student Information) (Wales) Regulations 2017
887 (W. 215)	The Education (Destination Information) (Prescribed Activities) (Wales) Regulations 2017
888	The Firefighters’ Pension Scheme (England) (Amendment) Regulations 2017
889 (L. 12)	The Civil Procedure (Amendment No. 2) Rules 2017
890	Not Allocated
891 (W. 217	The A470 Trunk Road (Caersws to Cemmaes Road, Powys) (Temporary Speed Restrictions & No Overtaking) Order 2017
892	The Firefighters’ Pension Schemes and Compensation Scheme (Amendment) (England) Order 2017
893 (C. 73)	The Wales Act 2017 (Commencement No. 2) Regulations 2017
894	The Air Navigation (Restriction of Flying) (Forth Road Bridge, Edinburgh) Regulations 2017
895	The Civil Enforcement of Parking Contraventions (Wokingham Borough Council) Designation Order 2017
896	The United Nations and European Union Financial Sanctions (Linking) (Amendment) Regulations 2017
897	The Alternative Fuels Infrastructure Regulations 2017
898	The Air Navigation (Restriction of Flying) (Forth Road Bridge, Edinburgh) (Amendment) Regulations 2017
899	The Lobsters and Crawfish (Prohibition of Fishing and Landing) (Amendment) (England) Order 2017
900	The Income-related Benefits (Subsidy to Authorities) Amendment Order 2017

== 901–1000 ==
Number	Title
901	The Social Services and Well-being (Wales) Act 2014 and the Regulation and Inspection of Social Care (Wales) Act 2016 (Consequential Amendments) Order 2017
902 (W. 218)	The A470 Trunk Road (Llangurig to Caersws, Powys) (Temporary Speed Restrictions and No Overtaking) Order 2017
903 (C. 74) (W. 219)	The Trade Union (Wales) Act 2017 (Commencement) Order 2017
904	The Infected Blood Schemes (Application of Sections 731, 733 and 734 of the Income Tax (Trading and Other Income) Act 2005) Order 2017
905	The Value Added Tax (Refund of Tax to Museums and Galleries) (Amendment) Order 2017
906	The Friendly Societies Act 1992 (Modification of Part 2) (Northern Ireland) Order 2017
907 (W. 220)	The A470 Trunk Road (Cemmaes Road Roundabout to County Border, South of Mallwyd, Powys) (Temporary Speed Restrictions and No Overtaking) Order 2017
908	The National Health Service (General Medical Services Contracts and Personal Medical Services Agreements) (Amendment) Regulations 2017
909 (W. 221)	The Health Education and Improvement Wales Regulations 2017
910 (W. 222)	The A40 Trunk Road (Gibraltar tunnels, Monmouth, Monmouthshire) (Temporary Prohibition of Vehicles & 40 mph Speed Limit) Order 2017
911	The M48 Motorway (Severn Bridge Weight) (Temporary Restriction of Traffic) Order 2017
912 (W. 223)	The Velindre National Health Service Trust (Establishment) (Amendment) Order 2017
913 (W. 224)	The Health Education and Improvement Wales (Establishment and Constitution) Order 2017
914	The Care Quality Commission (Reviews and Performance Assessments) (Amendment) Regulations 2017
915 (L. 13)	The Criminal procedure (Amendment No. 4) Rules 2017
916 (C. 75)	The Pensions Act 2014 (Commencement No. 11) and the Pension Schemes Act 2015 (Commencement No. 2) Regulations 2017
917 (W. 225)	The A40, A487, A4076, A477, A48, A483, A465, A470, A4060, A4232, A4042, A449 and A466 Trunk Roads & the A48(M), M4 and M48 Motorways (Various Locations in South and West Wales) (Temporary Prohibition of Vehicles) Order 2017
918 (C. 76)	The Children and Social Work Act 2017 (Commencement No. 1) Regulations 2017
919 (W. 226)	The A55 Trunk Road (Junction 36A Broughton, Flintshire) (Temporary Prohibition of Vehicles) Order 2017
920	The Nuclear Installations (Excepted Matter) Regulations 2017
921 (C. 77)	The Farriers (Registration) Act 2017 (Commencement) Regulations 2017
922	The Nuclear Installations (Insurance Certificate) Regulations 2017
923	The Air Navigation (Restriction of Flying) (Parsons Green, London) (Emergency) Regulations 2017
924	The Air Navigation (Restriction of Flying) (Parsons Green, London) (Emergency) (Revocation) Regulations 2017
925	The Air Navigation (Restriction of Flying) (Felthamhill, London) (Emergency) Regulations 2017
926 (C. 78)	The Water Act 2014 (Commencement No. 9 and Transitional Provisions) (Amendment) Order 2017
927	The Air Navigation (Restriction of Flying) (Felthamhill, London) (Emergency) (Revocation) Regulations 2017
928	The Democratic People's Republic of Korea (European Union Financial Sanctions) (Amendment) (No. 3) Regulations 2017
929 (C. 79)	The Immigration Act 2016 (Commencement No. 5) Regulations 2017
930	The Immigration Act 2014 (Current Accounts) (Freezing Orders: Code of Practice) Regulations 2017
931	The Immigration Act 2016 (Consequential Amendments) Regulations 2017
932	The Central Manchester University Hospitals NHS foundation trust and the University Hospital of South Manchester NHS Foundation Trust (Dissolution and Transfer of Property and Liabilities) Order 2017
933 (C. 80) (W. 227)	The Commons Act 2006 (Commencement No. 5 and Transitional Provisions (Wales) and Commencement No. 4 (Wales) (Amendment)) Order 2017
934	Not Allocated
935 (W. 229)	The Natural mineral water, Spring water and Bottled Drinking Water (Wales) (Amendment) Regulations 2017
936 (C. 81)	The Neighbourhood Planning Act 2017 (Commencement No. 2) Regulations 2017
937	Not Allocated
938 (W. 231))	The M4 Motorway (Junction 34 (Miskin), Rhondda Cynon Taf and Vale of Glamorgan) (Temporary Traffic Prohibitions and Speed Restrictions) Order 2017
939 (W. 232)	The Well-being of Future Generations (Wales) Act 2015 (Assessments of Local Well-being) Regulations 2017
940 (W. 233)	The Education (Supply of Information about the School Workforce) (Wales) Regulations 2017
941 (W. 234)	The Valuation Tribunal for Wales (Amendment) Regulations 2017
942 (C. 83)	The Energy Act 2016 (Commencement No. 4 and Transitory Provision) Regulations 2017
943	The Fishing Vessels (Codes of Practice) Regulations 2017
944	The Proscribed Organisations (Name Change) (No. 2) Order 2017
945	The Air Navigation (Restriction of Flying) (Wales Rally GB) Regulations 2017
946 (W. 235)	The Government of Wales Act 2006 (Budget Motions and Designated Bodies) Order 2017
947	The Registration of Births, Deaths, Marriages and Civil Partnerships (Fees) (Amendment) Regulations 2017
948 (C. 84) (W. 236)	The Children and Young Persons Act 2008 (Commencement No. 9) (Wales) Order 2017
949 (C. 85) (W. 237)	The Public Health (Wales) Act 2017 (Commencement) Order 2017
950 (W. 238)	The A483 Trunk Road (Layby, North of Abermule, Powys) (Temporary Prohibition of Vehicles and Cyclists) Order 2017
951 (W. 239)	The A487 Trunk Road (East Street, Bridge Street & West Street, Newport, Pembrokeshire) (Temporary Prohibition of Vehicles) Order 2017
952 (C. 86)	The Welfare Reform Act 2012 (Commencement No. 17, 19, 22, 23 and 24 and Transitional and Transitory Provisions (Modification)) Order 2017
953 (C. 87) (W. 240)	The Land Transaction Tax and Anti-avoidance of Devolved Taxes (Wales) Act 2017 (Commencement No. 1) Order 2017
954 (C. 88) (W. 241)	The Tax Collection and Management (Wales) Act 2016 (Commencement No. 1) Order 2017
955 (C. 89) (W. 242)	The Landfill Disposals Tax (Wales) Act 2017 (Commencement No. 1) Order 2017
956	Not Allocated
957	The Air Navigation (Restriction of Flying) (Remembrance Sunday) Regulations 2017
958	The NHS Counter Fraud Authority (Establishment, Constitution, and Staff and Other Transfer Provisions) Order 2017
959	The NHS Business Services Authority (Awdurdod Gwasanaethau Busnes y GIG) (Establishment and Constitution) (Amendment) Order 2017
960	The NHS Counter Fraud Authority (Investigatory Powers and Other Miscellaneous Amendments) Order 2017
961 (W. 244)	The Regulated Services (Notifications) (Wales) Regulations 2017
962 (W. 245)	The Marine Licensing (Delegation of Functions) (Wales) Order 2017
963 (W. 246)	The A55 Trunk Road (Eastbound Entry Slip Roads at Junction 4 (Dalar Hir) & Junction 6 (Nant Turnpike), Isle of Anglesey) (Temporary Prohibition of Vehicles) Order 2017
964 (W. 247)	The A483 Trunk Road (Junction 7, Rossett Interchange to the Wales/England Border, Wrexham County Borough) (Temporary Prohibition of Vehicles, Cyclists and 40 MPH Speed Limit) Order 2017
965 (W. 248)	The Education (Hazardous Equipment in Schools) (Removal of Restrictions on Use) (Wales) Regulations 2017
966	The General Dental Council (Continuing Professional Development) (Dentists and Dental Care Professionals) Rules Order of Council 2017
967 (C. 90) (W. 249)	The Public Health (Wales) Act 2017 (Commencement) (Amendment) Order 2017
968 (W. 250)	The A483 Trunk Road (Llanddewi Ystradenni to Newtown, Powys) (Temporary Prohibition of Vehicles) Order 2017
969	The Glyn Rhonwy Pumped Storage Generating Station (Correction) Order 2017
970 (C. 91)	The Finance Act 2016, Section 166 (Appointed Day) Regulations 2017
971 (W. 251)	The A487 Trunk Road (Tan y Coed Forest, north of Pantperthog to Corris, Gwynedd) (Temporary Traffic Prohibitions & Restrictions) Order 2017
972	The Republic of Mali (European Union Financial Sanctions) Regulations 2017
973 (W. 252)	The A55 Trunk Road (Westbound Carriageway between Junction 32a (Pentre Halkyn) & Junction 31 (Caerwys), Flintshire) (Temporary Prohibition of Vehicles, Cyclists & Pedestrians) Order 2017
974	The Air Navigation (Restriction of Flying) (Kensington, London) (Emergency) Regulations 2017
975	The Air Navigation (Restriction of Flying) (Kensington, London) (Emergency) (Revocation) Regulations 2017
976	The Crime and Courts Act 2013 (Commencement No. 15, Transitional and Savings Provisions) (Amendment) Order 2017
977	The Agricultural Holdings (Units of Production) (England) Order 2017
978	The Adoption and Children Act Register (Search and Inspection) Regulations 2017
979	The Transfer of Functions (Secretary of State for Digital, Culture, Media and Sport) Order 2017
980	The Inspectors of Education, Children's Services and Skills (No. 3) Order 2017
981	The Immigration (Jersey) (Amendment) Order 2017
982	The Counter-Terrorism and Security (Jersey) Order 2017
983	The Repatriation of Prisoners (Overseas Territories) Order 2017
984	The Policing and Crime Act (Financial Sanctions) (Overseas Territories) Order 2017
985	The Criminal Justice (Sentencing) (Licence Conditions) (Amendment) Order 2017
986	The Democratic People's Republic of Korea (European Union Financial Sanctions) (Amendment) (No. 4) Regulations 2017
987	The Social Security (Qualifying Young Persons Participating in Relevant Training Schemes) (Amendment) Regulations 2017
988	The Sections 106B, 106C and 106D of the Taxes Management Act 1970 (Specified Threshold Amount) Regulations 2017
989	The Offshore Asset Moves Penalty (Specified Territories) (Amendment) Regulations 2017
990 (W. 253)	The A55 Trunk Road (Westbound Carriageway between Junction 35 (Dobshill) & Junction 34 (Ewloe), Flintshire) (Temporary Prohibition of Vehicles, Cyclists & Pedestrians) Order 2017
991 (C. 92)	The Criminal Finances Act 2017 (Commencement No. 2 and Transitional Provisions) Regulations 2017
992	The Designation of Schools Having a Religious Character (Independent Schools) (England) (No. 2) Order 2017
993	Not Allocated
994	Not Allocated
995	The Social Security and Child Support (Care Payments and Tenant Incentive Scheme) (Amendment) Regulations 2017
996 (W. 254)	The Home Loss Payments (Prescribed Amounts) (Wales) Regulations 2017
997	Not Allocated
998 (W. 256)	The A40 Trunk Road (Treffgarne to Manorowen, Pembrokeshire) (Temporary Speed Restrictions & No Overtaking) Order 2017
999	The Democratic People's Republic of Korea (European Union Financial Sanctions) (Amendment) (No. 5) Regulations 2017
1000	Not Allocated

== 1001–1100 ==
Number	Title
1001	Not Allocated
1002	Not Allocated
1003	Not Allocated
1004	Not Allocated
1005	Not Allocated
1006	Not Allocated
1007	Not Allocated
1008	The Electronic Communications Code (Transitional Provisions) Regulations 2017
1009 (W. 258)	The Hirwaun Generating Station (Amendment) Order 2017
1010	The Air Navigation (Restriction of Flying) (Portsmouth and the Solent) (No. 2) Regulations 2017
1011	The Communications Act 2003 and the Digital Economy Act 2017 (Consequential Amendments to Secondary Legislation) Regulations 2017
1012	The Conservation of Habitats and Species Regulations 2017
1013	The Conservation of Offshore Marine Habitats and Species Regulations 2017
1014	The Air Navigation (Restriction of Flying) (Portsmouth and the Solent) (No. 2) (Revocation) Regulations 2017
1015	The Social Security (Miscellaneous Amendments No. 4) Regulations 2017
1016	The Social Security (Information-sharing in relation to Welfare Services etc.) (Amendment) Regulations 2017
1017 (C. 93)	The Policing and Crime Act 2017 (Commencement No. 4 and Saving Provisions) Regulations 2017
1018	The Anti-social Behaviour, Crime and Policing Act 2014 (Commencement No. 10) Order 2017
1019	The Criminal Legal Aid (Remuneration) (Amendment) Regulations 2017
1020	The Jobseeker's Allowance (Schemes for Assisting Persons to Obtain Employment) (Amendment) Regulations 2017
1021 (W. 259)	The A458 Trunk Road (Buttington Level Crossing, Buttington Cross, Powys) (Temporary Prohibition of Vehicles) Order 2017
1022 (W. 260)	The Tax Collection and Management (Administration) (Wales) Regulations 2017
1023 (W. 261)	The Education Workforce Council (Accreditation of Initial Teacher Training) (Additional Functions) (Wales) (Amendment) Order 2017
1024 (W. 262)	The Unauthorised Deposit of Waste (Fixed Penalties) (Wales) Regulations 2017
1025 (W. 263)	The Social Services and Well-being (Wales) Act 2014 (Consequential Amendments) Regulations 2017
1026 (W. 264)	The Water Resources (Miscellaneous Revocations) (Wales) Order 2017
1027 (W. 265)	The Network Rail (Summerway Overbridge) Order 2017
1028 (C. 94)	The Criminal Finances Act 2017 (Commencement No. 3) Regulations 2017
1029 (W. 266)	The A5, A40, A44, A55, A458, A470, A479, A483, A487, A489 and A494 Trunk Roads (Various Locations in North and Mid Wales) (Temporary Prohibition of Vehicles) Order 2017
1030 (W. 267)	The A40 Trunk Road (Llangadog to Llanwrda, Carmarthenshire) (Temporary Speed Restrictions & No Overtaking) Order 2017
1031 (W. 268)	The A4232 Trunk Road (Capel Llanilltern Roundabout, Cardiff) (40 mph Speed Limit) Order 2017
1032	The Healthy Start Scheme and Welfare Food (Miscellaneous Amendments) Regulations 2017
1033 (L. 14)	The Family Procedure (Amendment No. 3) Rules 2017
1034 (L. 15)	The Non-Contentious Probate (Amendment) Rules 2017
1035 (L. 16)	The Court of Protection Rules 2017
1036	The Mental Health Act 1983 (Places of Safety) Regulations 2017
1037	The Judicial Appointments and Discipline (Amendment and Addition of Offices) Order 2017
1038 (C. 95)	The Mental Health Act 2007 (Commencement No. 12 and Transitional Provisions) Order 2017
1039 (L. 17)	The Mental Health Review Tribunal for Wales (Amendment and constitution of tribunals) Rules 2017
1040 (W. 269)	The National Health Service (General Dental Services Contracts and Personal Dental Services Agreements) (Wales) (Amendment) Regulations 2017
1041 (W. 270)	The Private Water Supplies (Wales) Regulations 2017
1042	The Water Abstraction (Specified Enactments) Regulations 2017
1043 (C. 96)	The Water Act 2003 (Commencement No. 12) Order 2017
1044	The Water Abstraction and Impounding (Exemptions) Regulations 2017
1045 (C. 97)	The Environment Act 1995 (Commencement No. 25) Order 2017
1046	The Water Abstraction (Revocations etc.) (England) Order 2017
1047	The Water Abstraction (Transitional Provisions) Regulations 2017
1048	The Whittington Hospital National Health Service Trust (Establishment) (Amendment) Order 2017
1049	The General Medical Council (Miscellaneous Amendments) Order of Council 2017
1050	The Environmental Offences (Fixed Penalties) (England) Regulations 2017
1051	The Electricity Supplier Obligations (Amendment and Excluded Electricity) (Amendment) Regulations 2017
1052 (C. 98)	The Housing and Planning Act 2016 (Commencement No. 6) Regulations 2017
1053	The Electricity Capacity (Amendment) Regulations 2017
1054	The M42 Motorway (Junction 7a to Junction 9) (Warwickshire) (Temporary Prohibition of Traffic) Order 2017
1055 (C. 99)	The Technical and Further Education Act 2017 (Commencement No. 2 and Transitional Provision) Regulations 2017
1056	The National Health Service (Primary Dental Services and General Ophthalmic Services) (Amendment) Regulations 2017
1057	The Air Navigation (Restriction of Flying) (Portsmouth and the Solent) (No. 3) Regulations 2017
1058 (W. 271)	The Agricultural Wages (Wales) Order 2017
1059 (W. 272)	The A470 Trunk Road (Storey Arms, Powys) (Temporary Part-time 30 mph Speed Limit) Order 2017
1060 (W. 273)	The A40 Trunk Road (Broad Street, Llandovery, Carmarthenshire) (Temporary Prohibition of Vehicles & 20 mph Speed Limit) Order 2017
1061 (W. 274)	The A458 Trunk Road (High Street, Welshpool, Powys) (Prohibition of Waiting, Loading and Unloading) Order 2017
1062 (W. 275)	The A40 Trunk Road (Heol Draw to Scethrog, Powys) (Temporary Prohibition of Vehicles) Order 2017
1063 (C. 100)	The Communications Act 2003 (Commencement No. 5) Order 2017
1064	The Central Securities Depositories Regulations 2017
1065	The Horsham (Electoral Changes) Order 2017
1066	The Ashford (Electoral Changes) Order 2017
1067	The Allerdale (Electoral Changes) Order 2017
1068	The Manchester (Electoral Changes) Order 2017
1069 (C. 101)	The Wales Act 2017 (Commencement No. 3) Regulations 2017
1070	The Environmental Impact Assessment (Miscellaneous Amendments Relating to Harbours, Highways and Transport) Regulations 2017
1071	The United Nations and European Union Financial Sanctions (Linking) (Amendment) (No. 2) Regulations 2017
1072	The Corporation Tax (Instalment Payments) (Amendment) Regulations 2017
1073	The Infrastructure Planning (Compulsory Acquisition) (Amendment) (No. 2) Regulations 2017
1074	The Network Rail (Closure of Abbots Ripton Level Crossing) Order 2017
1075	Ionising Radiations Regulations 2017
1076	The Coroners and Justice Act 2009 (Alteration of Coroner Areas) (No. 2) Order 2017
1077	The Leeds (Electoral Changes) Order 2017
1078 (C. 102)	The Planning Act 2008 (Commencement No. 3) (England) Order 2017
1079	The Newcastle-under-Lyme (Electoral Changes) Order 2017
1080	The Newcastle upon Tyne (Electoral Changes) Order 2017
1081	The Teignbridge (Electoral Changes) Order 2017
1082	The South Norfolk (Electoral Changes) Order 2017
1083	The Torridge (Electoral Changes) Order 2017
1084	The Teachers’ Pensions Schemes (Miscellaneous Amendments) Regulations 2017
1085	The North Norfolk (Electoral Changes) Order 2017
1086	The Traffic Signs (Amendment) (England and Wales) Regulations and General Directions 2017
1087 (C. 103)	The Cultural Property (Armed Conflicts) Act 2017 (Commencement) Regulations 2017
1088	The M42 and M6 Toll Motorways (Curdworth to Coleshill, Warwickshire) (Temporary 50 Miles Per Hour Speed Restriction) Order 2017
1089	The Individual Savings Account (Amendment No. 3) Regulations 2017
1090	The General Anti-Abuse Rule Procedure (Amendment) Regulations 2017
1091	The Franchising Schemes and Enhanced Partnership Plans and Schemes (Provision of Information) Regulations 2017
1092	The Franchising Schemes and Enhanced Partnership Schemes (Application of TUPE) (England) Regulations 2017
1093	The Franchising Schemes and Enhanced Partnership Schemes (Pension Protection) (England) Regulations 2017
1094	The Venezuela (European Union Financial Sanctions) Regulations 2017
1095 (W. 276)	The Seed (Miscellaneous Amendments) (Wales) Regulations 2017
1096	The Childcare Payments (Amendment) Regulations 2017
1097 (W. 277)	The Regulated Services (Annual Returns) (Wales) Regulations 2017
1098 (W. 278)	The Regulated Services (Registration) (Wales) Regulations 2017
1099	Not Allocated
1100	The Patents and Patents (Fees) (Amendment) Rules 2017

== 1101–1335 ==
Number	Title
1101	The Childcare Payments (Eligibility) (Amendment) Regulations 2017
1102	The Regulation of Social Housing (Influence of Local Authorities) (England) Regulations 2017
1103 (W. 279)	The Novel Foods (Wales) Regulations 2017
1104	The Occupational Pensions (Revaluation) Order 2017
1105	The Dentists Act 1984 (Medical Authorities) Order 2017
1106 (W. 280)	The National Assembly for Wales (Returning Officers’ Charges) (Amendment) Order 2017
1107	The Mali (Sanctions) (Overseas Territories) Order 2017
1108	The Democratic People's Republic of Korea (Sanctions) (Overseas Territories) (Amendment) (No. 3) Order 2017
1109	The Marshall Scholarships Order 2017
1110	The North Korea (United Nations Sanctions) (Amendment) (No. 2) Order 2017
1111	The Inspectors of Education, Children's Services and Skills (No. 4) Order 2017
1112	The Air Navigation (Amendment) Order 2017
1113 (W. 281)	The A487 Trunk Road (New Street, Tal-y-bont, Ceredigion) (Part-time 20 mph Speed Limit) Order 2017
1114	The Misuse of Drugs Act 1971 (Amendment) (No. 2) Order 2017
1115	The Insolvency (England and Wales) and Insolvency (Scotland) (Miscellaneous and Consequential Amendments) Rules 2017
1116 (C. 104)	The Childcare Payments Act 2014 (Commencement No. 5) Regulations 2017
1117	The Misuse of Drugs (Amendment) (No. 2) (England, Wales and Scotland) Regulations 2017
1118	The Misuse of Drugs (Designation) (Amendment) (No. 2) (England, Wales and Scotland) Order 2017
1119	The Insolvency (Miscellaneous Amendments) Regulations 2017
1120	The Highways England Company Limited (M49 Avonmouth Junction) (Slip Roads, Special Roads) Scheme 2017 Confirmation Instrument 2017
1121	The A14 Cambridge to Huntingdon Improvement Scheme Development Consent (Correction) Order 2017
1122	The Tendring (Electoral Changes) Order 2017
1123 (W. 282)	The A55 Trunk Road (Slip Roads between Junction 8 (Ael y Bowl), Anglesey & Junction 11 (Llys y Gwynt Interchange), Gwynedd) (Temporary Prohibition of Vehicles, Cyclists & Pedestrians) Order 2017
1124	The Harborough (Electoral Changes) Order 2017
1125	The London Borough of Croydon (Electoral Changes) Order 2017
1126 (W. 283)	The A458 Trunk Road (Buttington to Cefn Bridge, Powys) (50 mph Speed Limit) Order 2017
1127	The Packaged Retail and Insurance-based Investment Products Regulations 2017
1128	The Air Navigation (Restriction of Flying) (Waddesdon) (Emergency) Regulations 2017
1129	The Diocese of Newcastle (Educational Endowments) (Byker St. Anthony's Church of England Primary School) Order 2017
1130	The Air Navigation (Restriction of Flying) (Waddesdon) (Emergency) (Revocation) Regulations 2017
1131 (C. 105)	The Armed Forces Act 2016 (Commencement No. 1) Regulations 2017
1132	The Non-Domestic Rating (Renewable Energy Projects) (Amendment) Regulations 2017
1133	The War Pensions Committees (Amendment) Regulations 2017
1134	The Police (Conduct, Complaints and Misconduct and Appeal Tribunal) (Amendment) Regulations 2017
1135	The Police Barred List and Police Advisory List Regulations 2017
1136 (C. 106)	The Digital Economy Act 2017 (Commencement No. 2) Regulations 2017
1137	The Town and Country Planning (Operation Stack) Special Development (Amendment) Order 2017
1138	The Cultural Test (Television Programmes) (Amendment) Regulations 2017
1139 (C. 107)	The Policing and Crime Act 2017 (Commencement No. 5 and Transitional Provisions) Regulations 2017
1140	The Police Federation (England and Wales) Regulations 2017
1141	The Road User Charging and Workplace Parking Levy (Classes of Motor Vehicles) (England) (Amendment) Regulations 2017
1142 (W. 284)	The Official Statistics (Wales) Order 2017
1143	The Ecodesign for Energy-Related Products (Amendment) Regulations 2017
1144	The Credit Unions Act 1979 (Locality Common Bond Conditions) Order 2017
1145	The Higher Education and Research Act 2017 (Transitory Provisions) Regulations 2017
1146 (C. 108)	The Higher Education and Research Act 2017 (Commencement No. 2) Regulations 2017
1147	The Recovery of Costs (Remand to Youth Detention Accommodation) (Amendment No. 2) Regulations 2017
1148 (L. 18)	The Civil Procedure Act 1997 (Amendment) Order 2017
1149	The Merchant Shipping (Working Time: Inland Waterways) (Amendment) Regulations 2017
1150	The Network Rail (Buxton Sidings Extension) Order 2017
1151	The State Pension Revaluation for Transitional Pensions Order 2017
1152	The State Pension Debits and Credits (Revaluation) (No. 2) Order 2017
1153	The London North West Healthcare National Health Service Trust (Establishment) and the Ealing Hospital National Health Service Trust and the North West London Hospitals National Health Service Trust (Dissolution) (Amendment) Order 2017
1154	The South Lakeland (Electoral Changes) Order 2017
1155 (W. 285)	The A4042 Trunk Road (Eastbound and Westbound Link Roads between Grove Park Roundabout and Caerleon Roundabout, Newport) (Temporary Prohibition of Vehicles) Order 2017
1156	The Motor Cars (Driving Instruction) (Amendment) Regulations 2017
1157 (C. 109)	The Scotland Act 2016 (Commencement No. 7) Regulations 2017
1158 (W. 286)	The A4076 Trunk Road (Hamilton Terrace, Milford Haven, Pembrokeshire) (Temporary Prohibition of Vehicles) Order 2017
1159 (W. 287)	The Non-Domestic Rating Contributions (Wales) (Amendment) Regulations 2017
1160	The Childcare (Early Years Provision Free of Charge) (Extended Entitlement) (Amendment) Regulations 2017
1161 (W. 288)	The A487 Trunk Road (Y Felinheli Bypass, Gwynedd) (Temporary Traffic Prohibitions & Restrictions) Order 2017
1162 (C. 110)	The Policing and Crime Act 2017 (Commencement No. 5 and Transitional Provisions) (Amendment) Regulations 2017
1163 (W. 289)	The Tax Collection and Management (Permitted Disclosures) (Wales) Regulations 2017
1164	The Statutory Auditors Regulations 2017
1165	The Fire and Rescue Authority (Membership) Order 2017
1166	The Fisheries and Rural Affairs (Miscellaneous Revocations) Regulations 2017
1167	The Banking Act 2009 (Service Providers to Payment Systems) Order 2017
1168 (L. 19)	The Tribunal Procedure (Amendment No. 2) Rules 2017
1169	The First-tier Tribunal and Upper Tribunal (Chambers) (Amendment No. 2) Order 2017
1170	The Diocese of Lichfield (Educational Endowments) (High Offley (St. Mary's) Church of England First School) Order 2017
1171	The Tax Avoidance Schemes (Miscellaneous Amendments) Regulations 2017
1172	The Inheritance tax Avoidance Schemes (Prescribed Descriptions of Arrangements) Regulations 2017
1173	The Payment Systems and Services and Electronic Money (Miscellaneous Amendments) Regulations 2017
1174	The National Insurance Contributions (Application of Part 7 of the Finance Act 2004) (Amendment) Regulations 2017
1175	The Data-gathering Powers (Relevant Data) (Amendment) Regulations 2017
1176	The Van Benefit and Car and Van Fuel Benefit Order 2017
1177	The Environmental Damage (Prevention and Remediation) (England) (Amendment) Regulations 2017
1178	The Plant Health (Forestry) (Amendment) (England and Scotland) Order 2017
1179 (C. 111)	The Wales Act 2017 (Commencement No. 4) Regulations 2017
1180	The Greater Manchester Combined Authority (Public Health Functions) Order 2017
1181	Not Allocated
1182	The Personal Portfolio Bonds (Amendment of Property Categories in Section 520 of the Income Tax (Trading and Other Income) Act 2005) Regulations 2017
1183 (C. 112)	The Finance Act 2014, Section 300 (Local Loans) (Appointed Day) Order 2017
1184	The Income tax (Indexation) Order 2017
1185	The Education (Recognised Awards) (Richmond The American International University in London) Order 2017
1186	The Animal Health (Miscellaneous Revocations) Order 2017
1187	The Social Security (Miscellaneous Amendments No. 5) Regulations 2017
1188	The Maritime Enforcement Powers (Persons of a Specified Description) Regulations 2017
1189	The Higher Education (Fee Limit Condition) (England) Regulations 2017
1190	The International Development Association (Eighteenth Replenishment) Order 2017
1191	The African Development Bank (Fourteenth Replenishment of the African Development Fund) Order 2017
1192	The African Development Fund (Multilateral Debt Relief Initiative) (Amendment) Order 2017
1183	The Asian Development Bank (Eleventh Replenishment of the Asian Development Fund) Order 2017
1194	The Caribbean Development Bank (Ninth Replenishment of the Unified Special Development Fund) Order 2017
1195	The International Development Association (Multilateral Debt Relief Initiative) (Amendment) Order 2017
1196	The Office for Students (Register of English Higher Education Providers) Regulations 2017
1197 (W. 290)	The Clocaenog Forest Wind Farm (Amendment) Order 2017
1198	The Common Agricultural Policy Basic Payment and Support Schemes (England) (Amendment) Regulations 2017
1199 (L. 20)	The Magistrates’ Courts (Adult Protection and Support Orders) Rules 2017
1200	The Control of Mercury (Enforcement) Regulations 2017
1201	The Severn Bridges Tolls Order 2017
1202	The M20 Junction 10a Development Consent Order 2017
1203	The Value Added Tax (Refund of Tax to the Cambridgeshire and Peterborough Combined Authority) Order 2017
1204	The Collective Investment Schemes and Offshore Funds (Amendment of the Taxation of Chargeable Gains Act 1992) Regulations 2017
1205	The Employment Rights Act 1996 and Pension Schemes Act 1993 (Amendment) Regulations 2017
1206	The Radio Equipment Regulations 2017
1207	The Greenhouse Gas Emissions Trading Scheme (Amendment) Regulations 2017
1208	The Motor vehicles (Driving Licences) (Amendment) Regulations 2017
1209	The Co-ownership Authorised Contractual Schemes (Tax) Regulations 2017
1210 (C. 113)	The Immigration Act 2016 (Commencement No. 6) Regulations 2017
1211	The West Northamptonshire Joint Committee (Revocation) Order 2017
1212	The Risk Transformation Regulations 2017
1213	The Ringing of Certain Captive-bred Birds (England and Wales) Regulations 2017
1214	The Blackpool Tramway (Blackpool North Extension) Order 2017
1215	The Indirect Taxes (Disclosure of Avoidance Schemes) Regulations 2017
1216	The Indirect Taxes (Notifiable Arrangements) Regulations 2017
1217 (C. 114)	The Children and Social Work Act 2017 (Commencement No. 2) Regulations 2017
1218 (W. 291)	The Agricultural Holdings (Units of Production) (Wales) Order 2017
1219	The Fishing Boats Designation (England) (Amendment) Order 2017
1220	The Plant Health (England) (Amendment) (No. 2) Order 2017
1221	The Producer Responsibility Obligations (Packaging Waste) (Amendment) Regulations 2017
1222	The Proceeds of Crime Act 2002 (Application of Police and Criminal Evidence Act 1984) (Amendment) Order 2017
1223	The Proceeds of Crime Act 2002 (Administrative Forfeiture Notices) (England and Wales and Northern Ireland) Regulations 2017
1224	The Corporate Interest Restriction (Financial Statements: Group Mismatches) Regulations 2017
1225 (W. 292)	The A40 Trunk Road (Llandeilo to Broad Oak, Carmarthenshire) (Temporary Speed Restrictions & No Overtaking) Order 2017
1226	The Administrative Forfeiture of Terrorist Cash and Terrorist Money Held in Bank and Building Society Accounts (Cash and Account Forfeiture Notices) Regulations 2017
1227	The Corporate Interest Restriction (Consequential Amendments) Regulations 2017
1228 (C. 115)	The National Citizen Service Act 2017 (Commencement No. 1) Regulations 2017
1229 (W. 293)	The Non-Domestic Rating (Small Business Relief) (Wales) Order 2017
1230 (C. 116)	The Charities Act 2011 (Commencement No. 3) Order 2017
1231	The Charitable Incorporated Organisations (Consequential Amendments) Order 2017
1232	The Charitable Incorporated Organisations (Conversion) Regulations 2017
1233	The Index of Company Names (Listed Bodies) Order 2017
1234	The Renewables Obligation (Amendment) Regulations 2017
1235	The Air Navigation (Restriction of Flying) (Portsmouth and The Solent) (No. 4) Regulations 2017
1236	The Air Navigation (Restriction of Flying) (Stonehenge) (No. 2) Regulations 2017
1237	The Civil Legal Aid (Procedure) (Amendment) (No. 2) Regulations 2017
1238	The Cremation (England and Wales) (Amendment) Regulations 2017
1239	The Road Vehicles (Payment of Duty by Credit Card) (Prescribed Fee) Regulations 2017
1240	The Drug Dealing Telecommunications Restriction Orders Regulations 2017
1241 (C. 117)	The Immigration Act 2016 (Commencement No. 7 and Transitional Provisions) Regulations 2017
1242	The Immigration Act 2016 (Consequential Amendments) (Immigration Bail) Regulations 2017
1243	The Neighbourhood Planning (General) and Development Management Procedure (Amendment) Regulations 2017
1244	The Town and Country Planning (Local Planning) (England) (Amendment) Regulations 2017
1245	The Penalties for Enablers of Defeated Tax avoidance (Legally Privileged Communications Declarations) Regulations 2017
1246	The Annual Tax on Enveloped Dwellings (Indexation of Annual Chargeable Amounts) Order 2017
1247	The Companies Act 1989 (Financial Markets and Insolvency) (Amendment) Regulations 2017
1248	The Pollution Prevention and Control (Designation of Directives) (England and Wales) Order 2017
1249 (C. 118)	The Policing and Crime Act 2017 (Commencement No. 6 and Transitional Provisions) Regulations 2017
1250	The Independent Office for Police Conduct (Transitional and Consequential) Regulations 2017
1251	The Road Vehicles (Construction and Use) (Amendment etc.) (No. 2) Regulations 2017
1252	The Greater London Authority (Consolidated Council Tax Requirement Procedure) Regulations 2017
1253 (W. 294)	The A487 Trunk Road (Caernarfon Flyover, Caernarfon, Gwynedd) (Temporary Prohibition of Vehicles) Order 2017
1254	The Tuberculosis (Non-bovine animals) Slaughter and Compensation (England) Order 2017
1255	The Financial Services and Markets Act 2000 (Markets in Financial Instruments) (No.2) Regulations 2017
1256	The Government Resources and Accounts Act 2000 (Estimates and Accounts) (Amendment) Order 2017
1257	The Football Spectators (2018 World Cup Control Period) Order 2017
1258	The Scotland Act 1998 (Designation of Receipts) (Amendment) Order 2017
1259	The Whole of Government Accounts (Designation of Bodies) Order 2017
1260	The Oxford Radcliffe Hospitals National Health Service Trust (Trust Funds: Appointment of Trustees) Revocation Order 2017
1261	The Superannuation (Admission to Schedule 1 to the Superannuation Act 1972) Order 2017
1262	The Fees for Payment of Taxes, etc. by Credit Card (Amendment) Regulations 2017
1263	The Income Tax (Pay As You Earn) (Amendment No. 2) Regulations 2017
1264 (W. 295)	The Regulated Services (Service Providers and Responsible Individuals) (Wales) Regulations 2017
1265	The Bolsover (Electoral Changes) Order 2017
1266	The Kingston upon Hull (Electoral Changes) Order 2017
1267	The Ribble Valley (Electoral Changes) Order 2017
1268	The Surrey Heath (Electoral Changes) Order 2017
1269	The North East Derbyshire (Electoral Changes) Order 2017
1270	The Blackburn with Darwen (Electoral Changes) Order 2017
1271	The Risk Transformation (Tax) Regulations 2017
1272	The Pension Schemes Act 2015 (Transitional Provisions and Appropriate Independent Advice) (Amendment No. 2) Regulations 2017
1273	The Small Business Commissioner (Scope and Scheme) Regulations 2017
1274 (W. 296)	The Building (Amendment) (Wales) Regulations 2017
1275	The Inspectors of Education, Children's Services and Skills (No. 5) Order 2017
1276	The International Headquarters and Defence Organisations (Designation and Privileges) Order 2017
1277	The Democratic People's Republic of Korea (Sanctions) (Overseas Territories) (Amendment) (No. 4) Order 2017
1278	The North Korea (United Nations Sanctions) (Amendment) (No. 3) Order 2017
1279	The Registration (Entries of Overseas Births and Deaths) (Amendment) Order 2017
1280	The Proceeds of Crime Act 2002 (Investigations in different parts of the United Kingdom) (Amendment) Order 2017
1281	The Firearms (Amendment) Rules 2017
1282	The Selection of the President of Welsh Tribunals Regulations 2017
1283	The Transfer of Functions (International Development) Order 2017
1284	The Electronic Communications Code (Jurisdiction) Regulations 2017
1285	The Communications Act 2003 and the Digital Economy Act 2017 (Consequential Amendments to Primary Legislation) Regulations 2017
1286 (C. 119)	The Digital Economy Act 2017 (Commencement No. 3) Regulations 2017
1287 (L. 21)	The Crown Court (Amendment) Rules 2017
1288 (C. 120) (W. 297)	The Water Act 2014 (Commencement No. 10) Order 2017
1289	The Renewables Obligation (Amendment) (Energy Intensive Industries) Order 2017
1290 (L. 22)	The Magistrates’ Courts (Freezing and Forfeiture of Terrorist Money in Bank and Building Society Accounts) Rules 2017
1291 (L. 23)	The Magistrates’ Courts (Detention and Forfeiture of Cash) (Amendment) Rules 2017
1292 (W. 298)	The Regulated Services (Penalty Notices) (Wales) Regulations 2017
1293 (L. 24)	The Magistrates’ Courts (Detention and Forfeiture of Listed Assets) Rules 2017
1294	The Diocese of Lincoln (Educational Endowments) (Legsby Old Church of England School) Order 2017
1295 (L. 25)	The Magistrates’ Courts (Detention and Forfeiture of Terrorist Cash) (Amendment) Rules 2017
1296 (L. 26)	The Magistrates’ Courts (Detention and Forfeiture of Terrorist Assets) Rules 2017
1297 (L. 27)	The Magistrates’ Courts (Freezing and Forfeiture of Money in Bank and Building Society Accounts) Rules 2017
1298	The Diocese of Manchester (Educational Endowments) (Stowell Memorial Church of England Primary School) Order 2017
1299	The Air Navigation (Restriction of Flying) (Edinburgh) Regulations 2017
1300	The Air Navigation (Restriction of Flying) (Hyde Park) Regulations 2017
1301	The Oversight of Professional Body Anti-Money Laundering and Counter Terrorist Financing Supervision Regulations 2017
1302	The Network Rail (Streat Green Underbridge) (Temporary Land Acquisition) Order 2017
1303	The M4 and M48 Motorways (Severn Bridges Charging Scheme) Order 2017
1304	The Capital Allowances Act 2001 (Extension of First-year Allowances) (Amendment) Order 2017
1305	The Council Tax Reduction Schemes (Amendment) (England) Regulations 2017
1306	The Special Educational Needs and Disability (First-tier Tribunal Recommendations Power) Regulations 2017
1307	The Building Societies (Restricted Transactions) (Amendment to the Limit on the Trade in Currencies) Order 2017
1308	The National Insurance Contributions (Application of Part 7 of the Finance Act 2004) (Amendment) (Amendment) Regulations 2017
1309	The Town and Country Planning (Permission in Principle) (Amendment) Order 2017
1310	The Apprenticeships (Miscellaneous Provisions) Regulations 2017
1311	The Export Control (Syria and Libya Sanctions) (Amendment) Order 2017
1312	The Environmental Protection (Microbeads) (England) Regulations 2017
1313	The Government Resources and Accounts Act 2000 (Audit of Public Bodies) Order 2017
1314	The Town and Country Planning (Fees for Applications, Deemed Applications, Requests and Site Visits) (England) (Amendment) Regulations 2017
1315	The East Devon (Electoral Changes) Order 2017
1316	The Designation of Rural Primary Schools (England) Order 2017
1317	The Immigration Act 2016 (Consequential Amendments) (Licensing of Booking Offices: Scotland) Regulations 2017
1318	The Care and Support (Deferred Payment) (Amendment) Regulations 2017
1319	The Criminal Legal Aid (Amendment) Regulations 2017
1320	The Blood Safety and Quality (Amendment) Regulations 2017
1321	The Non-Domestic Rating (Rates Retention) (Amendment) Regulations 2017
1322	The Ionising Radiation (Medical Exposure) Regulations 2017
1323	The Rent Officers (Housing Benefit and Universal Credit Functions) (Amendment) Order 2017
1324	The Dartmouth-Kingswear Floating Bridge (Revision of Charges etc.) Order 2017
1325	The Terrorism Act 2000 (Proscribed Organisations) (Amendment) Order 2017
1326 (C. 121) (W. 299)	The Regulation and Inspection of Social Care (Wales) Act 2016 (Commencement No. 5, Savings, Transitory and Transitional Provisions) Order 2017
1327 (W. 300)	The A487 & A40 Trunk Roads (Fishguard, Pembrokeshire) (Temporary Prohibition of Vehicles) Order 2017
1328	The Criminal Justice Act 1988 (Reviews of Sentencing) (Amendment No. 2) Order 2017
1329	The Boston Barrier Order 2017
1330 (W. 301)	The A494 Trunk Road (Tŷ Nant, near Cefnddwysarn, Gwynedd) (Temporary Traffic Prohibitions & Restrictions) Order 2017
1331 (W. 302)	The A483 Trunk Road (Rhosmaen Street, Llandeilo, Carmarthenshire) (Temporary Prohibition of Vehicles) Order 2017
1332 (W. 303)	The A55 Trunk Road (Eastbound Carriageway between Junction 23 (Llanddulas) and Junction 24 (Faenol Interchange), Conwy County Borough) (Temporary Prohibition of Vehicles, Cyclists and Pedestrians) Order 2017
1333 (W. 304)	The A5 Trunk Road (Llangollen, Denbighshire to Pentrefoelas, Conwy County Borough) (Temporary 40 MPH Speed Restriction and No Overtaking) Order 2017
1334 (W. 305)	The A55 Trunk Road (Westbound Carriageway between Junction 24 (Faenol Interchange) and Junction 23 (Llanddulas), Conwy County Borough) (Temporary Prohibition of Vehicles, Cyclists and Pedestrians) Order 2017
1335	The Local Government Finance Act 1988 (Non-Domestic Rating Multipliers) (England) Order 2017

== See also ==
- List of statutory instruments of the United Kingdom, 2016
- List of statutory instruments of the United Kingdom, 2018
- List of statutory instruments of the United Kingdom, 2019
- List of statutory instruments of the United Kingdom, 2020
