= Ionising Radiations Regulations =

United Kingdom statutory legislation

The Ionising Radiations Regulations (IRR) are statutory instruments which form the main legal requirements for the use and control of ionising radiation in the United Kingdom. There have been several versions of the regulations, the current legislation was introduced in 2017 (IRR17), repealing the 1999 regulations and implementing the 2013/59/Euratom European Union directive.

The main aim of the regulations as defined by the 1999 official code of practice was to "establish a framework for ensuring that exposure to ionising radiation arising from work activities, whether man made or natural radiation and from external radiation or internal radiation, is kept as low as reasonably practicable (ALARP) and does not exceed dose limits specified for individuals".

== The 1999 regulations ==
Ionising Radiations Regulations 1985
- Statutory Instrument
- Parliament of the United Kingdom
- Citation: SI 1985/1333

Dates
- Made: 23 August 1985
- Laid before Parliament: 4 September 1985
- Commencement: 1 January 1986
- Revoked: 1 January 2000

Other legislation
- Repeals/revokes: Ionising Radiations (Unsealed Radioactive Substances) Regulations 1968; Ionising Radiations (Sealed Sources) Regulations 1969; Radioactive Substances (Road Transport Workers) (Great Britain) Regulations 1970
- Made under: Health and Safety at Work etc. Act 1974
- Revoked by: Ionising Radiations Regulations 1999

Status: Revoked

Text of statute as originally enacted

Ionising Radiations Regulations 1999
- Statutory Instrument
- Parliament of the United Kingdom
- Citation: SI 1999/3232
- Introduced by: Larry Whitty – Department of the Environment, Transport and the Regions
- Territorial extent: United Kingdom, overseas

Dates
- Made: 3 December 1999
- Commencement: 1 January 2000
- Revoked: 1 January 2018

Other legislation
- Repeals/revokes: Ionising Radiations Regulations 1985; Ionising Radiations (Outside Workers) Regulations 1993
- Made under: European Communities Act 1972; Health and Safety at Work etc. Act 1974
- Transposes: Council Directive 96/29/Euratom
- Revoked by: Ionising Radiations Regulations 2017

Status: Revoked

Text of statute as originally enacted

=== Background ===
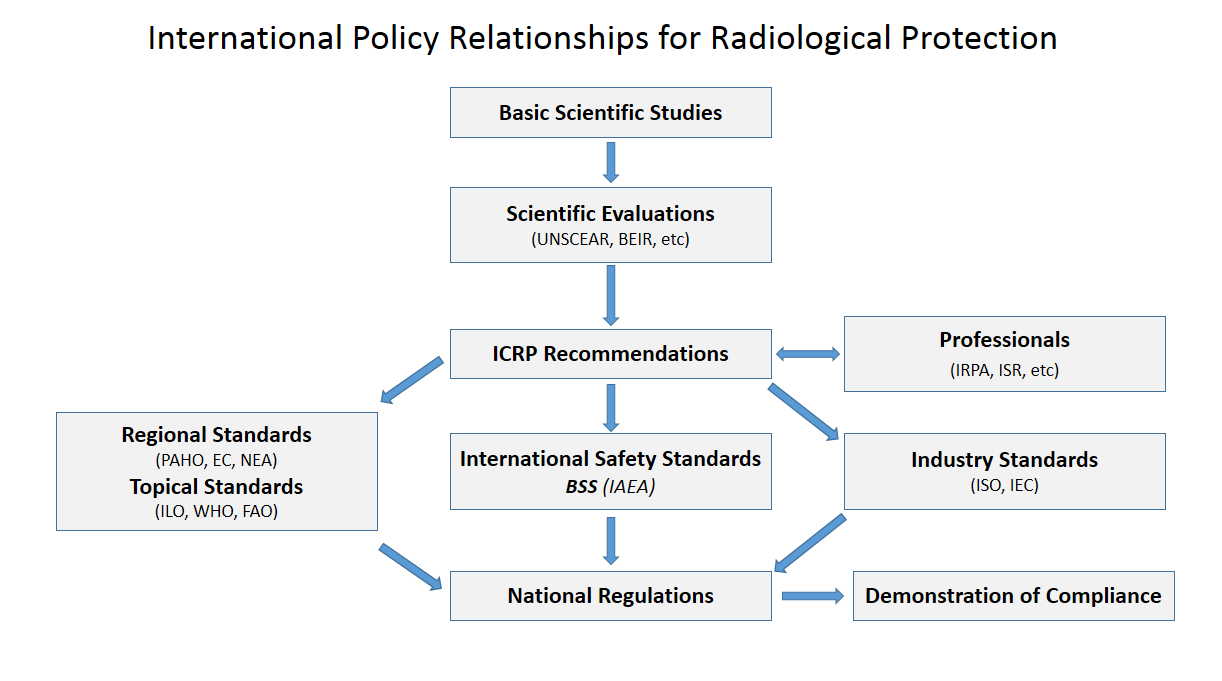
International policy relationships in radiological protection

The Ionising Radiations Regulations 1999 (SI 1999/3232) came into force on 1 January 2000, replacing the Ionising Radiations Regulations 1985 (SI 1985/1333). They effectively implement the majority of the European Basic Safety Standards Directive '96/29/Euratom' under the auspices of the Health and Safety at Work etc. Act 1974. This European Directive is in turn a reflection of the recommendations of the International Commission on Radiological Protection.

The regulations are aimed at employers and are enforced by the Health and Safety Executive (HSE). They form the legal basis for ionising radiation protection in the United Kingdom (UK), although work with ionising radiation is also controlled in the UK through other statutes such as the Nuclear Installations Act 1965 and the Radioactive Substances Act 1993.

The IRR99 make legal requirements including prior authorisation of the use of particle accelerators and x-ray machines, the appointment of radiation protection supervisors (RPS) and advisers (RPA), control and restriction of exposure to ionising radiation (including dose limits), and a requirement for local rules. Local rules including the designation of controlled areas, defined as places where "special procedures are needed to restrict significant exposure".

In 2013 the European Union adopted directive 2013/59/Euratom which requires updated Ionising Radiations Regulations to implement the directive in UK law by 2018. Changes include reduced eye dose limits as a result of updated ICRP recommendations.

=== Ionising and non-ionising radiation and associated health risks ===
The regulations impose duties on employers to protect employees and anyone else from radiation arising from work with radioactive substances and other forms of ionising radiation. In the United Kingdom the Health and Safety Executive is one of a number of public bodies which regulates workplaces which could expose workers to radiation.

Radiation itself is energy that travels either as electromagnetic waves, or as subatomic particles and can be categorised as either 'ionising' or 'non-ionising radiation'.

Ionising radiation occurs naturally but can also be artificially created. Generally people can be exposed to radiation externally from radioactive material or internally by inhaling or ingesting radioactive substances. Exposure to electromagnetic rays such as x-rays and gamma rays can, depending on the time exposed, cause sterility, genetic defects, premature ageing and death.

Non-ionising radiation is the terms used to describe the part of the electromagnetic spectrum covering 'Optical radiation', such as ultraviolet light and 'electromagnetic fields' such as microwaves and radio frequencies. Health risks caused by exposure to this type of radiation will often be as a result of too much exposure to ultraviolet light either from the sun or from sunbeds which could lead to skin cancer.

=== Key areas of the regulations ===
The regulations are split into seven parts containing 41 regulations. under the following sections.

- Interpretation and General
- General Principles and Procedures
- Arrangements for The Management of Radiation Protection
- Designated Areas
- Classification and Monitoring of Persons
- Arrangements for the Control of Radioactive Substances, Articles and Equipment
- Duties of Employees and Miscellaneous

=== Dose limits ===
In addition to requiring that radiation employers ensure that doses are kept as low as reasonably practicable (ALARP), the IRR99 also defines dose limits for certain classes of person. Dose limits do not apply to people undergoing a medical exposure or to those acting as "comforters and carers" to such.

Annual Dose Limits
Class of Person	Annual Dose Limit (millisieverts)
Employees aged 18 or over	20
Trainees aged 16 to 18	6
Any other person	1

== Changes in the 2017 regulations ==
Ionising Radiations Regulations 2017
- Statutory Instrument
- Parliament of the United Kingdom
- Citation: SI 2017/1075
- Territorial extent: United Kingdom, overseas

Dates
- Made: 27 November 2017
- Laid before Parliament: 30 November 2017
- Commencement: 1 January 2018

Other legislation
- Repeals/revokes: Ionising Radiations Regulations 1999
- Made under: European Communities Act 1972; Health and Safety at Work etc. Act 1974
- Transposes: Council Directive 2013/59/Euratom
- Amended by: Ionising Radiation (Medical Exposure) Regulations 2017

Status: Current legislation

Text of statute as originally enacted

=== Key changes ===
The main changes in the Ionising Radiations Regulations 2017 (SI 2017/1075) are summarised in the approved code of practice. These include:

- Reduced eye dose limit
- "Graded approach" to authorisation
- Broader definition of outside worker
- Requirement for procedures to estimate dose to the public
- Changes to guidance on cooperation of employees and timescale for medical appeals

The introduction of the Ionising Radiation (Medical Exposure) Regulations 2017 (SI 2017/1322) (IRMER17, the legislation that governs medical exposures in the UK) amended IRR17 to remove the regulation concerning medical equipment. These requirements are now under IRMER17.

=== Dose limits ===
The dose limit to the lens of the eye has been reduced based on ICRP recommendation, the new limits are now as follows

Class of Person	Annual Dose Limit (millisieverts)			
Class of Person	Effective dose	Lens of the eye	Extremities	Skin (averaged over 1 cm^{2})
Employees and trainees aged 18 or over	20	20	500	500
Trainees aged 16 to 18	6	15	150	150
Any other person	1	15	50	50

== See also ==
- Sievert – SI unit of radiation dose. This page is a useful introduction to the many different dose quantities
- Radiation protection
