= Childcare Payments Act 2014 =

- Act of Parliament
- Parliament of the United Kingdom
- Long title: An Act to make provision for and in connection with the making of payments to persons towards the costs of childcare; and to restrict the availability of an exemption from income tax in respect of the provision for an employee of childcare, or vouchers for obtaining childcare, under a scheme operated by or on behalf of the employer.
- Citation: 2014 c. 28
- Introduced by: George Osborne
- Territorial extent: England and Wales, Scotland and Northern Ireland

Dates
- Royal assent: 17 December 2014
- Commencement: 17 December 2014

Status: Current legislation

Text of statute as originally enacted

The Childcare Payments Act 2014 (c. 28) is an act of the Parliament of the United Kingdom that received royal assent on 17 December 2014, after being introduced on 5 June 2014. The purpose of the act was to support working families by encouraging parents to take paid employment by offering eligible parents to pay into an online childcare account which will be automatically topped up by the Government, therefore reducing the burden of childcare costs on such families.

== Background ==
Before the act was passed, parents were entitled to 570 hours of free early education or childcare per year, which works out to 15 hours per week over a 38-week period.

== Overview ==
The key provisions as defined by the legislation are:

- Her Majesty's Revenue and Customs (HMRC) will make top-up payments of 25% towards the costs of qualifying childcare into a specially designated childcare account.
- In order for the costs to qualify they must be in respect of care or supervised activity that is not in the course of compulsory education and the costs of such care are primarily to enable the person to work.
- In order to qualify for the top-ups a person (or partner) must be in the United Kingdom, aged over 16, responsible for the child, in paid work and must not be receiving Universal Credit or other government childcare support. In addition a person is not eligible if they and their partner have income in excess of £150,000
- The Government would provide 20% support on costs of £10,000 per year for each child via an online account to a maximum of £2,000 per child, through an online account.

== See also ==
- List of legislation in the United Kingdom
