= Sea Fish Industry Act 1970 =

Act of the Parliament of the United Kingdom

Sea Fish Industry Act 1970 (Note: Section 62(1).)
- Act of Parliament
- Parliament of the United Kingdom
- Long title: An Act to consolidate certain enactments relating to the sea fishing industry and to repeal certain obsolete enactments relating to herring.
- Citation: 1970 c. 11
- Territorial extent: United Kingdom

Dates
- Royal assent: 12 March 1970
- Commencement: 12 May 1970 (Note: Section 62(2).)
Other legislation
Amends	See § Repealed enactments
Repeals/revokes	See § Repealed enactments
Amended by	Fisheries Act 1981
Relates to	Sea Fisheries Act 1868; Inshore Fishing (Scotland) Act 1984

Status: Partially repealed

Text of statute as originally enacted

Revised text of statute as amended

Text of the Sea Fish Industry Act 1970 as in force today (including any amendments) within the United Kingdom, from legislation.gov.uk.

The Sea Fish Industry Act 1970 (c. 11) is an act of the Parliament of the United Kingdom that consolidated certain enactments relating to the sea fishing industry in the United Kingdom and repealed certain obsolete enactments relating to herring.

== Provisions ==
The act was divided into four parts. Part I established the White Fish Authority and governed the white fish industry, including provisions for registration, licensing, levies, and financial assistance. Part II governed the Herring Industry Board and the herring industry. Part III provided for grants and subsidies to vessels and the fishing industry more generally. Part IV contained general and supplementary provisions, including interpretation and the commencement of the act.

=== Repealed enactments ===
Section 61(1) of the act repealed 21 enactments and revoked one order, listed in parts I, II and III of the sixth schedule to the act, respectively.

Part I - miscellaneous repeals
Citation	Short title	Extent of repeal
25 & 26 Geo. 5. c. 9	Herring Industry Act 1935	The whole act except sub-paragraph (ii) of the proviso to section 3(gg) and section 11.
1 & 2 Geo. 6. c. 42	Herring Industry Act 1938	The whole act.
7 & 8 Geo. 6. c. 32	Herring Industry Act 1944	The whole act.
11 & 12 Geo. 6. c. 51	White Fish and Herring Industries Act 1948	The whole act.
14 & 15 Geo. 6. c. 30	Sea Fish Industry Act 1951	Part I. Sections 24 and 28. Schedules 1 to 3.
1 & 2 Eliz. 2. c. 17	White Fish and Herring Industries Act 1953	The whole act.
5 & 6 Eliz. 2. c. 22	White Fish and Herring Industries Act 1957	The whole act.
8 Eliz. 2. c. 7	Sea Fish Industry Act 1959	The whole act.
10 & 11 Eliz. 2. c. 31	Sea Fish Industry Act 1962	Section 1. Sections 3 to 9. Sections 29 and 30. Section 32. In section 33(1), the definitions of "fishery harbour", "processing", "products" and "white fish". In section 33(2), the definition of "the appropriate Minister", paragraphs (a) and (b) of the definition of "the Ministers", and in paragraph (c) the words "in section seventeen of this Act." Section 33(4) and (5). Sections 34 and 35. Section 37(1), except paragraph (c). Section 37(2). Schedules 2 and 3.
1968 c. 77	Sea Fisheries Act 1968	Sections 1 to 4. In section 18(2) the words "except section 4(4)". In section 19, the definition of "products". Section 22(3) and (4). Schedule 1, Part I.

Part II - repeal of obsolete enactments relating to herring
Citation	Short title	Extent of repeal
48 Geo. 3. c. 110	Herring Fishery (Scotland) Act 1808	In section 48, the words from "also for sorting the herrings taken" to "branded according to the true intent and meaning thereof". In section 50, the words from the beginning to "or any mark or character in imitation thereof; or" and the words from "and every barrel or cask" to the end.
11 Geo. 4 & 1 Will. 4. c. 54	Fisheries (Scotland) Act 1830	The whole act.
14 & 15 Vict. c. 26	Herring Fishery Act 1851	Section 2.
23 & 24 Vict. c. 92	Herring Fisheries (Scotland) Act 1860	In section 3, the words "and the branding of barrels containing the same".
24 & 25 Vict. c. 72	White Herring Fishery (Scotland) Act 1861	In section 7, the words "and the branding of barrels containing the same".
45 & 46 Vict. c. 78	Fishery Board (Scotland) Act 1882	In Schedule 1, the entries relating to the Fisheries Act 1824, the Fisheries (Scotland) Act 1830, the Herring Fisheries (Scotland) Act 1858, the Herring Fisheries (Scotland) Act 1865 and an Act of 37 & 38 Vict. (c. 25) to remove restrictions contained in the British White Herring Fishery Acts in regard to the use of fir wood for herring barrels.
48 & 49 Vict. c. 70	Sea Fisheries (Scotland) Amendment Act 1885	Section 9.
8 Edw. 7. c. 17	Cran Measures Act 1908	In section 6, the words "and the Branding of Herrings (Northumberland) Act, 1891" and the words from "and in any area" to the end. Section 7.
3 & 4 Geo. 5. c. 9	Herring Fishery (Branding) Act 1913	The whole act.
22 & 23 Geo. 5. c. 11	Northern Ireland (Miscellaneous Provisions) Act 1932	Section 8.
25 & 26 Geo. 5. c. 9	Herring Industry Act 1935	In section 3, sub-paragraph (ii) of the proviso to paragraph (gg). Section 11.

Part III
Reference	Title	Extent of revocation
SI 1969/388	Transfer of Functions (Wales) Order 1969	In paragraph 1 of Schedule 2, sub-paragraphs (b) and (e). In paragraph 5 of Schedule 2, sub-paragraphs (h), (l) and (p).

== Subsequent developments ==
The whole act except sections 14, 42 and 62 was repealed by section 46(2) of, and part I of schedule 5 to, the Fisheries Act 1981 (c. 29), which came into force on 1 October 1981.
