= Sea Fish (Conservation) Act 1967 =

Act of the Parliament of the United Kingdom

Sea Fish (Conservation) Act 1967 (Note: Section 26.)
- Act of Parliament
- Parliament of the United Kingdom
- Long title: An Act to consolidate (with corrections and improvements made under the Consolidation of Enactments (Procedure) Act 1949) certain enactments which provide for regulating the commercial use of, fishing for, and landing of, sea fish, and for authorising measures for the increase or improvement of marine resources.
- Citation: 1967 c. 84
- Territorial extent: United Kingdom

Dates
- Royal assent: 27 October 1967
- Commencement: 27 November 1967 (Note: Section 26.)

Other legislation
- Amends: See § Repealed enactments
- Repeals/revokes: See § Repealed enactments
- Amended by: Sea Fisheries Act 1968; Fisheries Act 1981; Sea Fish (Conservation) Act 1992; Fisheries Act 2020
- Relates to: Sea Fisheries (Shellfish) Act 1967

Status: Amended

Text of statute as originally enacted

Revised text of statute as amended

Text of the Sea Fish (Conservation) Act 1967 as in force today (including any amendments) within the United Kingdom, from legislation.gov.uk.

The Sea Fish (Conservation) Act 1967 (c. 84) is an act of the Parliament of the United Kingdom that consolidated enactments relating to the commercial use of, fishing for, and landing of sea fish, and authorising measures for the increase or improvement of marine resources in the United Kingdom.

== Provisions ==
=== Repealed enactments ===
Section 25(1) of the act repealed 9 enactments, listed in the schedule to the act.

Enactments repealed by section 25(1)
Citation	Short title	Extent of repeal
23 & 24 Geo. 5. c. 45	Sea-Fishing Industry Act 1933	The whole act, except section 4(2).
1 & 2 Geo. 6. c. 30	Sea Fish Industry Act 1938	Part II, except so much of section 38 as substituted a new provision for section 4(2) of the Sea-Fishing Industry Act 1933. Section 62(1).
11 & 12 Geo. 6. c. 51	White Fish and Herring Industries Act 1948	Sections 1, 2 and 10(a).
14 & 15 Geo. 6. c. 30	Sea Fish Industry Act 1951	Sections 22 and 23.
1 & 2 Eliz. 2. c. 17	White Fish and Herring Industries Act 1953	In Part I of the Schedule, in the entry relating to section 10 of the White Fish and Herring Industries Act 1948, the words from "for" where first occurring to "and" where last occurring.
8 Eliz. 2. c. 7	Sea Fish Industry Act 1959	Sections 4 to 8. Section 9(1)(a) and (b). Sections 10, 11 and 12. Section 13(1) except the definition of "the Ministers", and in that definition the words from "and except" to the end. Section 14(2).
10 & 11 Eliz. 2. c. 31	Sea Fish Industry Act 1962	Sections 10 to 15. In section 17, in subsection (1), the words "or byelaw", in subsection (2), the words from "contained" to the end except the words "having effect as modified by section sixteen of this Act", and, in subsection (3), the words "or byelaw". Section 32(2)(a) so far as it relates to receipts in pursuance of an order made in accordance with section 11(5) of that Act. In section 33(1), the definitions of "British-owned" and "fishing boat". In section 33(2)(a) and (b), the words "sections ten to twelve and". Section 34(3), except in so far as it relates to orders under Part III of the Sea Fisheries Act 1868, and section 34(4) and (5). Section 35(3) and (4) and in section 35(5), the words "fourteen, fifteen". Section 36(2) and, in section 36(3), the words "fifteen and". In section 37(2), the words from "and the" to the end. In Schedule 2, paragraphs 5, 6, 10, 25 and 26.
1963 c. 38	Water Resources Act 1963	In Schedule 13, paragraph 17.
1964 c. 72	Fishery Limits Act 1964	In Schedule 1, the entries relating to the Sea-Fishing Industry Act 1933, the White Fish and Herring Industries Act 1948, the Sea Fish Industry Act 1959 and the Sea Fish Industry Act 1962 except the entry relating to section 16(1) of the last mentioned Act.
