= Fisheries Act =

Stock short title used for legislation

Fisheries Act (with its variations) is a stock short title used for legislation in multiple countries relating to fisheries. The Bill for an Act with this short title will have been known as a Fisheries Bill during its passage through Parliament.

Fisheries Acts may be a generic name either for legislation bearing that short title or for all legislation which relates to fisheries.

== Bangladesh ==
- The Protection and Conservation of Fish Act, 1950 (East Bengal Act XVIII of 1950)
- The Protection and Conservation (Amendment) Ordinance (1982) amended version of the Protection and Conservation of Fish Act, 1950
- The Protection and Conservation of Fish Rules (1985) version of the Protection and Conservation of Fish Act, 1950 implemented in 1985
- The Marine Fisheries Ordinance (1983) as implemented by The Marine Fisheries Rules (1983)
- The Tanks Improvement Act, 1939 (Bengal Act No. XV of 1939) An act that provides for the improvement of tanks in Bangladesh for purposes of aquaculture and irrigation
- The Shrimp Culture Users Tax Ordinance 1992 An act that describes tax requirement for aquaculture of shrimp farms in the coastal region of the country

== Canada ==
- The Fisheries Act

== India ==
- The Indian Fisheries Act, 1897

== Malaysia ==
- The Fisheries Act 1963
- The Fisheries Act 1985

== New Zealand ==
- The Fisheries Act 1908
- The Fisheries Act 1983
- The Fisheries Act 1996
- The Maori Fisheries Act 2004

== Republic of Ireland ==
- The Fisheries (Statute Law Revision) Act 1949
- The Fisheries (Statute Law Revision) Act 1956

== United Kingdom ==
- The Fisheries Act 1705 (c. 48) [12mo: c. 2] (S)
- The Public Works and Fisheries Acts Amendment Act 1863 (26 & 27 Vict. c. 81)
- The Fishery Harbours Act 1915 (5 & 6 Geo. 5. c. 48)
- The Fisheries Act 1955 (3 & 4 Eliz. 2. c. 7)
- The Fishery Limits Act 1964 (c. 72)
- The Fishery Limits Act 1976 (c. 86)
- The Fisheries Act 1981 (c. 29)
- The Aquaculture and Fisheries (Scotland) Act 2007 (asp 12)
- The Foyle Fisheries Act (Northern Ireland) 1952 (c. 5) (NI)
- The Foyle Fisheries (Amendment) Act (Northern Ireland) 1962 (c. 5) (NI)
- The Fisheries Act (Northern Ireland) 1966 (c. 17) (NI)
- The Fisheries (Amendment) Act (Northern Ireland) 1968 (c. 31) (NI)
- The Fisheries (Amendment) Act (Northern Ireland) 2001 (c. 4)
- The Sea Fisheries Regulation Act 1966 (c. 38)
- The Sea Fisheries (Shellfish) Act 1967 (c. 83)
- The Sea Fisheries Act 1968 (c. 77)
- The Sea Fisheries (Shellfish) Act 1973 (c. 30)
- The Sea Fisheries (Wildlife Conservation) Act 1992 (c. 36)
- The Sea Fisheries (Shellfish) (Amendment) Act 1997 (c. 3)
- The Sea Fisheries (Shellfish) Amendment (Scotland) Act 2000 (asp 12)
- The Salmon and Freshwater Fisheries (Protection) (Scotland) Act 1951 (14 & 15 Geo. 6. c. 26)
- The Salmon and Freshwater Fisheries Act 1975 (c. 51)
- The Freshwater and Salmon Fisheries (Scotland) Act 1976 (c. 22)
- The Salmon and Freshwater Fisheries (Consolidation) (Scotland) Act 2003 (asp 15)
- The Oyster Fisheries (Scotland) Act 1840 (3 & 4 Vict. c. 74)
- The Mussel Fisheries (Scotland) Act 1847 (10 & 11 Vict. c. 92)
- The Tweed Fisheries Act 1857 (20 & 21 Vict. c. cxlviii)
- The Tweed Fisheries Amendment Act 1859 (22 & 23 Vict. c. lxx)
- The Tweed Fisheries Act 1969 (c. xxiv)
- The Seal Fishery Act 1875 (38 & 39 Vict. c. 18)
- The Seal Fishery (North Pacific) Act 1893 (56 & 57 Vict. c. 23)

The Seal Fisheries Acts 1895 and 1912 is the collective title of the Seal Fisheries (North Pacific) Act 1895 (58 & 59 Vict. c. 21) and the Seal Fisheries (North Pacific) Act 1912 (2 & 3 Geo. 5. c. 10).

The Fisheries (Ireland) Acts 1842 to 1895 was the collective title of the following Acts:

- The Fisheries (Ireland) Act 1842 (5 & 6 Vict. c. 106)
- The Fisheries (Ireland) Act 1844 (7 & 8 Vict. c. 108)
- The Fisheries (Ireland) Act 1845 (8 & 9 Vict. c. 108)
- The Fisheries (Ireland) Act 1848 (11 & 12 Vict. c. 92)
- The Fisheries (Ireland) Act 1850 (13 & 14 Vict. c. 88)
- The Salmon Fishery (Ireland) Act 1863 (26 & 27 Vict. c. 114)
- The Oyster Beds (Ireland) Act 1866 (29 & 30 Vict. c. 88)
- The Oyster Fishery (Ireland) Amendment Act 1866 (29 & 30 Vict. c. 97)
- The Salmon Fishery (Ireland) Act 1869 (32 & 33 Vict. c. 9)
- The Fisheries (Ireland) Act 1869 (32 & 33 Vict. c. 92)
- The Pollen Fishing (Ireland) Act 1881 (44 & 45 Vict. c. 66)
- The Oyster Cultivation (Ireland) Act 1884 (47 & 48 Vict. c. 48)
- The Fisheries (Ireland) Act 1888 (51 & 52 Vict. c. 30)
- The Steam Trawling (Ireland) Act 1889 (52 & 53 Vict. c. 74)
- The Pollen Fishing (Ireland) Act 1891 (54 & 55 Vict. c. 20)
- The Fisheries Close Season (Ireland) Act 1895 (58 & 59 Vict. c. 29)

The Herring Fisheries (Scotland) Acts 1821 to 1890 was the collective title of the following Acts:

- The White Herring Fisheries Act 1771 (11 Geo. 3. c. 31)
- The Herring Fishery (Scotland) Act 1808 (48 Geo. 3. c. 110)
- The Herring Fishery (Scotland) Act 1815 (55 Geo. 3. c. 94)
- The Herring Fishery (Scotland) Act 1821 (1 & 2 Geo. 4. c 79)
- The Fisheries Act 1824 (5 Geo. 4. c 64)
- The Fisheries (Scotland) Act 1830 (11 Geo. 4 & 1 Will. 4. c. 54)
- The Herring Fishery Act 1851 (14 & 15 Vict. c. 26)
- The Herring Fisheries (Scotland) Act 1858 (21 & 22 Vict. c. 69)
- The Herring Fisheries (Scotland) Act 1860 (23 & 24 Vict. c. 92)
- The Herring Fishery (Scotland) Act 1861 (24 & 25 Vict. c. 72)
- The Herring Fisheries (Scotland) Act 1865 (28 & 29 Vict. c. 22)
- The Herring Fisheries (Scotland) Act 1867 (30 & 31 Vict. c. 52)
- The Herring Fishery (Scotland) Act 1889 (52 & 53 Vict. c. 23)
- The Herring Fishery (Scotland) Act Amendment Act 1890 (53 & 54 Vict. c. 10)

The Salmon Fisheries (Scotland) Acts 1828 to 1868 was the collective title of the following Acts:

- The Salmon Fisheries (Scotland) Act 1828 (9 Geo. 4. c. 39)
- The Salmon Fisheries (Scotland) Act 1844 (7 & 8 Vict. c. 95)
- The Salmon Fisheries (Scotland) Act 1862 (25 & 26 Vict. c. 97)
- The Salmon Fisheries (Scotland) Act 1864 (27 & 28 Vict. c. 118)
- The Salmon Fisheries (Scotland) Act 1868 (31 & 32 Vict. c. 123)

The Salmon and Freshwater Fisheries Acts 1861 to 1892 was the collective title of the following Acts:

- The Salmon Fishery Act 1861 (24 & 25 Vict. c. 109)
- The Salmon Acts Amendment Act 1863 (26 & 27 Vict. c. 10)
- The Salmon Fishery Act 1865 (28 & 29 Vict. c. 121)
- The Salmon Acts Amendment Act 1870 (33 & 34 Vict. c. 33)
- The Salmon Fishery Act 1873 (36 & 37 Vict. c. 71)
- The Salmon Fishery Act 1876 (39 & 40 Vict. c. 19)
- The Elver Fishing Act 1876 (39 & 40 Vict. c. 34)
- The Fisheries (Dynamite) Act 1877 (40 & 41 Vict. c. 65)
- The Freshwater Fisheries Act 1878 (41 & 42 Vict. c. 39)
- The Salmon Fishery Law Amendment Act 1879 (42 & 43 Vict. c. 26)
- The Freshwater Fisheries Act 1884 (47 & 48 Vict. c. 11)
- The Freshwater Fisheries Act 1886 (49 & 50 Vict. c. 2)
- The Salmon and Freshwater Fisheries Act 1886 (49 & 50 Vict. c. 39)
- The Fisheries Act 1891 (54 & 55 Vict. c. 37) (Parts III and IV)
- The Salmon and Freshwater Fisheries Act 1892 (55 & 56 Vict. c. 50)

The Sea Fisheries Acts 1843 to 1893 is the collective title of the following Acts:

- The Sea Fisheries Act 1843 (6 & 7 Vict. c. 79)
- The Sea Fisheries Act 1868 (31 & 32 Vict. c. 45)
- The Oyster and Mussel Fisheries Orders Confirmation Act 1869 (32 & 33 Vict. c. 31)
- The Sea Fisheries Act 1875 (38 & 39 Vict. c. 15)
- The Fisheries (Oyster, Crab, and Lobster) Act 1877 (40 & 41 Vict. c. 42)
- The Sea Fisheries Act 1883 (46 & 47 Vict. c. 22)
- The Sea Fisheries Act 1884 (47 & 48 Vict. c. 27)
- The Sea Fisheries (Scotland) Amendment Act 1885 (48 & 49 Vict. c. 70)
- The Fisheries Act 1891 (54 & 55 Vict. c. 37) (Part I)
- The North Sea Fisheries Act 1893 (56 & 57 Vict. c. 17)

== United States ==
- 1871 joint resolution (16 Stat. 593) creation of United States Fish Commission
- The Alien Fisheries act of 1906
- The Northern Pacific Halibut Act of 1924
- The Marine Mammal Protection Act of 1972
- The Endangered Species Act of 1973
- The Magnuson–Stevens Fishery Conservation and Management Act
- The Sustainable Fisheries Act of 1996

== See also ==
- List of short titles
