= Sea Fisheries Act 1868 =

Act of the Parliament of the United Kingdom

Sea Fisheries Act 1868 (Note: Section 2.)
- Act of Parliament
- Parliament of the United Kingdom
- Long title: An Act to carry into effect a Convention between Her Majesty and the Emperor of the French concerning the Fisheries in the Seas adjoining the British Islands and France, and to amend the Laws relating to British Sea Fisheries.
- Citation: 31 & 32 Vict. c. 45
- Territorial extent: United Kingdom (Note: Section 70.)

Dates
- Royal assent: 13 July 1868
- Commencement: 1 February 1869 (Note: Section 3. By notice in the London Gazette.)
- Repealed: 26 May 2015

Other legislation
- Amends: See § Repealed enactments
- Repeals/revokes: See § Repealed enactments
- Amended by: Medway Regulation Continuance Act 1868; Oyster and Mussel Fisheries Orders Confirmation Act 1869 (No. 2); Sea Fisheries Act 1875; Sea Fisheries Act 1883; Merchant Shipping Act 1894; False Oaths (Scotland) Act 1933; Crown Estate Act 1961; Fishery Limits Act 1964; Sea Fisheries (Shellfish) Act 1967; Sea Fisheries Act 1968; Statute Law (Repeals) Act 1981; Statute Law (Repeals) Act 1993
- Repealed by: Deregulation Act 2015
- Relates to: Billingsgate Market Act 1846; Sea Fish Industry Act 1970; Inshore Fishing (Scotland) Act 1984

Status: Repealed

Text of statute as originally enacted

The Sea Fisheries Act 1868 (31 & 32 Vict. c. 45) was an act of the Parliament of the United Kingdom that gave effect to a convention between the United Kingdom and France concerning fisheries in the seas adjoining the British Islands and France, and amended the laws relating to British sea fisheries.

== Provisions ==
=== Repealed enactments ===
Section 71 of the act repealed 64 enactments, listed in the second schedule to the act.

Citation	Short title	Description	Extent of repeal
4 Hen. 7. c. 21	Orford Haven (Illegal Fishing Nets) Act 1488	An Act for y^{e} Preservation of the Fry of Fish.	The whole act.
7 Hen. 7. c. 9 (Note: This is the citation in The Statutes of the Realm.)	Fish Act 1491	Orford. [In Statutes of the Realm only.]	The whole act.
5 Eliz. c. 5	Maintenance of the Navy Act 1562	An Act touching certayne Politique Constitutions made for the Maintenance of the Navye.	The whole act.
13 & 14 Car. 2. c. 28 (Note: This is the citation in The Statutes at Large.)	Pilchard Fishing Act 1662	An Act for the Regulation of the Pilchard Fishing in the Counties of Devon and Cornwall.	The whole act.
10 & 11 Will. 3. c. 24	Billingsgate, etc. Act 1698	An Act for making Billingsgate a free Market for the Sale of Fish. [10 Will. 3. c. 13 in Statutes of the Realm.]	The whole act.
9 Anne c. 26	Thames Fishery Act 1710	An Act for the better Preservation and Improvement of the Fishery within the River of Thames, and for regulating and governing the Company of Fishermen of the said River. [c. 28 in Statutes of the Realm.]	The whole act.
1 Geo. 1. s. 2. c. 18	Fish Act 1714	An Act for the better preventing fresh Fish taken by Foreigners being imported into this Kingdom; and for the Preservation of the Fry of Fish; and for the giving Leave to import Lobsters and Turbets in Foreign Bottoms; and for the better Preservation of Salmon within several Rivers in that Part of this Kingdom called England.	The whole act.
2 Geo. 2. c. 19	Medway Oyster Fishery Act 1728	An Act for regulating, well-ordering, governing, and improving the Oyster Fishery in the River Medway and Waters thereof, under the Authority of the Mayor and Citizens of the City of Rochester in the County of Kent.	The whole act.
29 Geo. 2. c. 23	Fisheries (Scotland) Act 1756	An Act for encouraging the Fisheries in that Part of Great Britain called Scotland.	In part; namely, except sections one and seventeen, so far as they relate to Scotland.
33 Geo. 2. c. 27	Fish Act 1759	An Act to repeal so much of an Act passed in the Twenty-ninth Year of His present Majesty's Reign, concerning a free Market for Fish at Westminster, as requires Fishermen to enter their Fishing Vessels at the Office of the Searcher of the Customs at Gravesend; and to regulate the Sale of Fish at the First Hand in the Fish Markets at London and Westminster; and to prevent Salesmen of Fish buying Fish to sell again on their own Account; and to allow Bret and Turbot, Brill and Pearl, although under the respective Dimensions mentioned in a former Act, to be imported and sold; and to punish Persons who shall take or sell any Spawn, Brood, or Fry of Fish, unsizeable Fish, or Fish out of Season, or Smelts under the Size of Five Inches, and for other Purposes.	The whole act.
2 Geo. 3. c. 15	Fish Carriage Act 1762	An Act for the better supplying the Cities of London and Westminster with Fish, and to reduce the present exorbitant Price thereof, and to protect and encourage Fishermen.	In part; namely, except section seven.
11 Geo. 3. c. 31	White Herring Fisheries Act 1771	An Act for the Encouragement of the White Herring Fishery.	In part; namely, except sections eleven to thirteen.
19 Geo. 3. c. 26	White Herring Fishery Act 1779	An Act to continue and amend an Act made in the Eleventh Year of His present Majesty's Reign, intituled "An Act for the Encouragement of the White Herring Fishery."	The whole act.
26 Geo. 3. c. 45	Pilchard Fishery Act 1786	An Act to continue and amend an Act made in the Twenty-fifth Year of the Reign of His present Majesty, for the Encouragement of the Pilchard Fishery, by allowing a further Bounty upon Pilchards taken, cured, and exported.	The whole act.
26 Geo. 3. c. 81	Fisheries (No. 2) Act 1786	An Act for the more effectual Encouragement of the British Fisheries.	In part; namely, except section nineteen.
27 Geo. 3. c. 10	Fisheries Act 1787	An Act to extend the Provisions of an Act made in the Twenty-sixth Year of His present Majesty's Reign, intituled "An Act for the more effectual Encouragement of the British Fisheries."	The whole act.
30 Geo. 3. c. 54	Westminster Fish Market Act 1790	An Act for vesting the Estates and Property of the Trustees of Westminster Fish Market in the Marine Society for the Purposes therein mentioned, and for discontinuing the Powers of the said Trustees.	The whole act.
31 Geo. 3. c. 45	Pilchard Fisheries Act 1791	An Act for the Encouragement of the Pilchard Fishery, by allowing a further Bounty upon Pilchards taken, cured, and exported.	The whole act.
35 Geo. 3. c. 54	Mackerel Fishery Act 1795	An Act for the Encouragement of the Mackerel Fishery.	The whole act.
35 Geo. 3. c. 56	British Fisheries Act 1795	An Act to continue and amend an Act made in the Twenty-sixth Year of the Reign of His present Majesty, intituled "An Act for the more effectual Encouragement of the British Fisheries."	The whole act.
36 Geo. 3. c. 77	Mackerel Fishery Act 1796	An Act to explain and amend an Act made in the last Session of Parliament, intituled "An Act for the Encouragement of the Mackerel Fishery."	The whole act.
36 Geo. 3. c. 118	Fish Act 1796	An Act to authorize the Sale of Fish at Billingsgate by Retail.	The whole act.
37 Geo. 3. c. 94	Bounty on Pilchards Act 1797	An Act to continue an Act made in the Thirty-first Year of the Reign of His present Majesty, intituled "An Act for the Encouragement of the Pilchard Fishery, by allowing a further Bounty upon Pilchards taken, cured, and exported."	The whole act.
38 Geo. 3. c. 58	British Fisheries Act 1798	An Act to continue until the First Day of March One thousand seven hundred and ninety-nine an Act made in the Thirty-fifth Year of the Reign of His present Majesty, intituled "An Act to continue and amend an Act made in the Twenty-sixth Year of the Reign of His present Majesty, intituled 'An Act for the more effectual Encouragement of the British Fisheries.'"	The whole act.
39 Geo. 3. c. 100	British Fisheries Society Act 1799	An Act to revive and continue until the End of the next Session of Parliament an Act made in the Thirty-fifth Year of the Reign of His present Majesty, to continue and amend an Act made in the Twenty-sixth Year of the Reign of His present Majesty, intituled "An Act for the more effectual Encouragement of the British Fisheries;" and to amend an Act made in the Twenty-sixth Year of the Reign of His present Majesty, for extending the Fisheries and improving the Sea Coast of this Kingdom.	In part; namely, section one.
39 & 40 Geo. 3. c. 85	British Fisheries Act 1800	An Act to continue until the Fifth Day of April One thousand eight hundred and one, and amend, an Act of the last Session of Parliament, for continuing several Acts for the Encouragement of the British Fisheries.	The whole act.
39 & 40 Geo. 3. c. 107	Importation (No. 2) Act 1800	An Act to permit until Six Weeks after the Commencement of the next Session of Parliament the Importation of Swedish Herrings into Great Britain.	The whole act.
41 Geo. 3. (U.K.) c. 97 (Note: Cited as 41 Geo. 3. sess. 2. c. 97.)	Fisheries, Continuance of Laws Act 1801	An Act the Title of which begins with the Words "An Act to continue several Laws relating to encouraging the Fisheries," and ends with the Words "as relates to ascertaining the Strength of Spirits by Clarke's Hydrometer."	The whole act.
41 Geo. 3. (U.K.) c. 99 (Note: Cited as 41 Geo. 3. sess. 2. c. 99.)	Fish Act 1801	An Act for granting Bounties for taking and bringing Fish to the Cities of London and Westminster, and other Places in the United Kingdom.	The whole act.
42 Geo. 3. c. 3	Fish Act 1801	An Act to revive and continue until the Twenty-fifth Day of March One thousand eight hundred and three so much of an Act made in the Forty-first Year of the Reign of His present Majesty as relates to permitting the Use of Salt Duty-free in preserving of Fish, and to discontinuing the Bounty payable on White Herrings exported, and to indemnify all Persons who have issued or acted under any Orders for delivering Salt Duty-free for the Purposes in the said Act mentioned.	The whole act.
42 Geo. 3. c. 19	Westminster Fish Market Act 1802	An Act to amend so much of an Act made in the Twenty-ninth Year of the Reign of His late Majesty King George the Second, intituled "An Act for explaining, amending, and rendering more effectual an Act made in the Twenty-second Year of His present Majesty's Reign, intituled 'An Act for making a free Market for the Sale of Fish in the City of Westminster, and for preventing the forestalling and monopolizing of Fish, and for allowing the Sale of Fish, under the Dimensions mentioned in a Clause contained in an Act of the First Year of His late Majesty's Reign, in case the same are taken with a Hook,' as relates to the Sale of Eels."	The whole act.
42 Geo. 3. c. 79	British Fisheries, etc. Act 1802	An Act to revive and continue until the Fifth Day of April One thousand eight hundred and four, and to amend, several Acts passed in the Twenty-seventh, Thirty-fifth, and Thirty-ninth Years of His present Majesty's Reign, for the more effectual Encouragement of the British Fisheries; and to continue until the Fourteenth Day of June One thousand eight hundred and three, and from thence to the End of the then next Session of Parliament, so much of an Act of the Sixth Year of the Reign of His present Majesty as relates to the prohibiting the Importation of Foreign wrought Silks and Velvets.	The whole act.
42 Geo. 3. c. lxxxviii	London Fish Trade Act 1802	An Act for repealing so much of an Act made in the Second Year of the Reign of His present Majesty, intituled "An Act for the better supplying the Cities of London and Westminster with Fish, and to reduce the present exorbitant Price thereof; and to protect and encourage Fishermen," as limits the Number of Fish to be sold by Wholesale within the said City of London, and for the better Regulation of the Sale of Fish by Wholesale in the Market of Billingsgate within the said City.	The whole act.
43 Geo. 3. c. 29	Continuance of Laws Act 1803	An Act the Title of which begins with the Words "An Act to revive and continue," and ends with the Words "to the End of the then next Session of Parliament."	The whole act.
44 Geo. 3. c. 86	British Fisheries Act 1804	An Act for reviving, amending, and further continuing several Laws relating to the more effectual Encouragement of the British Fisheries until the Fifth Day of April One thousand eight hundred and six, and to the Encouragement of the Trade and Manufactures of the Isle of Man, to the improving the Revenue thereof; and the more effectual Prevention of smuggling to and from the said Island, until the Fifth Day of July One thousand eight hundred and five.	The whole act.
45 Geo. 3. c. 102	Pilchard Fishery Act 1805	An Act to revive and continue an Act made in the Thirty-first Year of His present Majesty, intituled "An Act for the Encouragement of the Pilchard Fishery by allowing a further Bounty upon Pilchards taken, cured, and exported."	The whole act.
46 Geo. 3. c. 34	British Fisheries Act 1806	An Act for further continuing until the Twenty-fifth Day of March One thousand eight hundred and seven an Act made in the Thirty-ninth Year of His present Majesty, for the more effectual Encouragement of the British Fisheries.	The whole act.
47 Geo. 3. sess. 2. c. 51	British Fisheries Act 1807	An Act to revive and continue until the Twenty-fifth Day of March One thousand eight hundred and eight an Act of the Thirty-ninth Year of His present Majesty, for the more effectual Encouragement of the British Fisheries.	The whole act.
47 Geo. 3. sess. 2. c. 67	Importation (No. 5) Act 1807	An Act to permit, until the End of the next Session of Parliament, the Importation of Swedish Herrings into Great Britain.	The whole act.
48 Geo. 3. c. 86	British Fisheries Act 1808	An Act to revive and continue until the Twenty-fifth Day of March One thousand eight hundred and nine an Act of the Thirty-ninth Year of His present Majesty, for the more effectual Encouragement of the British Fisheries.	The whole act.
48 Geo. 3. c. 110	Herring Fishery (Scotland) Act 1808	An Act for the further Encouragement and better Regulation of the British White Herring Fishery until the First Day of June One thousand eight hundred and thirteen, and from thence to the End of the then next Session of Parliament.	In part; namely, except sections 4, 5, 7, 9, 10, 11, 12, 18, 31, 32, 34 to 45, 47 to 50, 51, 53, 54, and 56 to 60, so far as they relate to Scotland, and are not inconsistent with this act.
50 Geo. 3. c. 54	British Fisheries Act 1810	An Act to revive and continue until the Twenty-fifth Day of March One thousand eight hundred and eleven an Act of the Thirty-ninth Year of His present Majesty, for the more effectual Encouragement of the British Fisheries.	The whole act.
50 Geo. 3. c. 108	Sea Fisheries (Scotland) Act 1810	An Act to amend and enlarge the Powers of an Act passed in the Second Year of His present Majesty, for the Encouragement of the Fisheries of this Kingdom, and the Protection of the Persons employed therein.	In part; namely, sections one to four.
51 Geo. 3. c. 34	Southern Whale Fishery Act 1811	An Act for continuing the Premiums allowed to Ships employed in the Southern Whale Fishery.	The whole act.
51 Geo. 3. c. 101	British White Herring Fishery Act 1811	An Act for amending an Act of the Forty-eighth Year of His present Majesty, for regulating the British White Herring Fishery.	The whole act.
52 Geo. 3. c. 42	Bounties on Pilchards Act 1812	An Act for amending the Laws relating to the Allowance of the Bounties on Pilchards exported until the Twenty-fourth Day of June One thousand eight hundred and nineteen.	The whole act.
54 Geo. 3. c. 102	British White Herring Fishery Act 1814	An Act to continue until the End of the next Session of Parliament several Acts relating to the British White Herring Fishery.	The whole act.
55 Geo. 3. c. 94	Herring Fishery (Scotland) Act 1815	An Act to continue and amend several Acts relating to the British White Herring Fishery.	In part; namely, except sections 1 to 4, 9 to 15, 17, 18, 20, 21, 23, 31 to 33, and 38 to 43, so far as they relate to Scotland, and are not inconsistent with this act.
59 Geo. 3. c. 77	Bounties on Pilchards Act 1819	An Act to continue until the Twenty-fourth Day of June One thousand eight hundred and twenty-six an Act for amending the Laws relating to the Allowance of the Bounties on Pilchards exported.	The whole act.
1 Geo. 4. c. 82	Irish Fisheries Act 1820	An Act to amend an Act of the Fifty-ninth Year of the Reign of His late Majesty King George the Third for the Encouragement and Improvement of the Irish Fisheries.	The whole act.
1 Geo. 4. c. 103	British Fisheries Act 1820	An Act for the further Encouragement and Improvement of the British Fisheries.	The whole act.
1 & 2 Geo. 4. c. 79	White Herring Fishery (Scotland) Act 1821	An Act to repeal certain Bounties granted for the Encouragement of the Deep Sea British White Herring Fishery, and to make further Regulations relating to the said Fishery.	In part; namely, except section 9 and except sections 3 and 5 so far as they relate to Scotland.
5 Geo. 4. c. 64	Fisheries Act 1824	An Act to amend the several Acts for the Encouragement and Improvement of the British and Irish Fisheries.	In part; namely, sections 1 to 8.
7 Geo. 4. c. 34	British and Irish Fisheries Act 1826	An Act to amend an Act of the Fifth Year of His present Majesty, for amending the several Acts for the Encouragement and Improvement of the British and Irish Fisheries.	The whole act.
11 Geo. 4 & 1 Will. 4. c. 54	Fisheries (Scotland) Act 1830	An Act to revive, continue, and amend several Acts relating to the Fisheries.	In part; namely, so much as relates to England, and so much as is inconsistent with this act.
4 & 5 Will. 4. c. 20	Sale of Fish Act 1834	An Act to explain and amend an Act passed in the Thirty-third Year of the Reign of His late Majesty King George the Second, to regulate the Conveyance and Sale of Fish at first hand.	The whole act.
6 & 7 Vict. c. 79	Sea Fisheries Act 1843	An Act to carry into effect a Convention between Her Majesty and the King of the French concerning the Fisheries in the Seas between the British Islands and France.	The whole act.
14 & 15 Vict. c. 26	Herring Fishery Act 1851	An Act to amend the Acts relating to the British White Herring Fishery.	In part; namely, sections 5 and 6.
18 & 19 Vict. c. 101	Fishery Convention with France Act 1855	An Act for the more effectual Execution of the Convention between Her Majesty and the French Government concerning the Fisheries in the Seas between the British Islands and France.	The whole act.
23 & 24 Vict. c. 92	Herring Fisheries (Scotland) Act 1860	An Act to amend the Law relative to the Scottish Herring Fisheries.	In part; namely, sections 7, 11 to 13, and 25.
24 & 25 Vict. c. 72	White Herring Fishery (Scotland) Act 1861	An Act to make further Provision for the Regulation of the British White Herring Fishery in Scotland.	In part; namely, sections 2, 3, and 6, and so much of the remainder of the act as is inconsistent with this act.
28 & 29 Vict. c. 22	Herring Fisheries (Scotland) Act 1865	An Act to amend the Acts relating to the Scottish Herring Fisheries.	In part; namely, so much as is inconsistent with this act.
29 & 30 Vict. c. 85	Oyster and Mussel Fisheries Act 1866	An Act to facilitate the Establishment, Improvement, and Maintenance of Oyster and Mussel Fisheries in Great Britain.	The whole act.
30 & 31 Vict. c. 18	Oyster Preservation Act 1867	An Act for the Preservation and further Protection of Oyster Fisheries.	The whole act.

== Subsequent developments ==
The repeal of the Medway Oyster Fishery Act 1728 (2 Geo. 2. c. 19) by the act was reversed by Medway Regulation Continuance Act 1868 (31 & 32 Vict. c. 53), which came into force on 13 July 1868.

The act was gradually repealed in parts by various legislation. Section 25 of, and the second schedule to, the act were repealed by schedule 2, part I to the Sea Fisheries Act 1883 (46 & 47 Vict. c. 22).

Sections 22 to 24 were repealed by section 745 of, and schedule 22 to, the Merchant Shipping Act 1894 (57 & 58 Vict. c. 60), which came into force on 1 January 1895.

Sections 3, 4, 6 to 21, 59 and 61 of, and the first schedule to, the act were repealed by the Fishery Limits Act 1964, which came into force on 30 September 1964.

In section 57 the words " except any felony and " were repealed for England and Wales by section 10(2) of, and part I of schedule 3 to, the Criminal Law Act 1967, which came into force on 1 January 1968.

Sections 27 to 56 and 68 of the act were repealed by schedule 3 to the Sea Fisheries (Shellfish) Act 1967, which came into force on 27 November 1967.

Sections 1, 66 and 67 of the act were repealed by schedule 2 to the Sea Fisheries Act 1968.

Section 69 of the act was repealed by section 1(1) of, and part XII of schedule 1 to, the Statute Law (Repeals) Act 1981, which came into force on 21 May 1981.

Section 65 of the act were repealed by section 1(1) of, and group 3 of part II of schedule 1 to, the Statute Law (Repeals) Act 1993, which came into force on 5 November 1993.

The whole act was repealed by section 107 of, and paragraph 31(a) of schedule 23 to, the Deregulation Act 2015, which came into force on 26 May 2015.
