= Irish fisheries law =

Irish fisheries law is the fisheries law of Ireland. It relates to Irish fisheries.

== Republic of Ireland ==
Acts of the Oireachtas include the Fisheries (Consolidation) Act 1959, the Fisheries (Amendment) Act 1962, the Fisheries (Amendment) Act 1964, the Fisheries (Amendment) Act 1976, the Fisheries Act 1980, the Fisheries (Amendment) Act 1987, the Fisheries (Amendment) (No. 2) Act 1987, the Fisheries (Amendment) Act 1991, the Fisheries (Amendment) Act 1994, the Fisheries (Amendment) Act 1995, the Fisheries (Commissions) Act 1997, the Fisheries (Amendment) Act 1997, the Fisheries and Foreshore (Amendment) Act 1998, the Fisheries (Amendment) Act 1999, the Fisheries (Amendment) Act 2001, and the Fisheries (Amendment) Act 2003.

As to inland fisheries, see the Inland Fisheries Acts 1959 to 2017, which include, amongst other Acts, the Inland Fisheries Act 2010 and the Inland Fisheries (Amendment) Act 2017. Inland Fisheries Ireland was created by section 6(1) of the Inland Fisheries Act 2010.

As to the River Foyle, see the Foyle Fisheries Act 1952, the Foyle Fisheries (Amendment) Act 1961, the Foyle Fisheries (Amendment) Act 1976, the Foyle Fisheries (Amendment) Act 1983, and the Foyle and Carlingford Fisheries Act 2007.

As to sea fisheries, see the Sea Fisheries Act 1952, the Sea Fisheries (Amendment) Act 1955, the Sea Fisheries (Amendment) Act 1956, the Sea Fisheries (Amendment) Act 1959, the Sea Fisheries (Amendment) Act 1963, the Sea Fisheries (Amendment) Act 1970, the Sea Fisheries (Amendment) Act 1974, the Sea Fisheries (Amendment) Act 1982, the Sea-Fisheries and Maritime Jurisdiction Act 2006, and the Sea-Fisheries (Amendment) Act 2019.

== Northern Ireland ==
Primary legislation includes the Fisheries Act (Northern Ireland) 1966, the Fisheries (Amendment) Act (Northern Ireland) 1968, the Fisheries Amendment (Northern Ireland) Order 1981, the Fisheries (Amendment) (Northern Ireland) Order 1991, the Fisheries (Amendment) Act (Northern Ireland) 2001 and the Fisheries Act (Northern Ireland) 2016. As to the Fisheries Act (Northern Ireland) 1966, see DPP v McNeill and Others.

As to the River Foyle, see the Northern Ireland (Foyle Fisheries) Act 1952 (15 & 16 Geo 6 & 1 Eliz 2 c 11), the Foyle Fisheries Act (Northern Ireland) 1952 (c 5) as to which see Foyle Fisheries Commission v Timoney, the Foyle Fisheries (Amendment) Act (Northern Ireland) 1962 and the Foyle and Carlingford Fisheries (Northern Ireland) Order 2007.

== History ==
The earliest purely Irish statute on the kindred subjects of nuisances to navigation and fisheries was the 5 Ed 4 c 6; but it merely referred to foreign vessels visiting the Irish coasts for the purposes of fishing, and had no permanent effect on the subjects' common law right. The next Irish statute, however, was of much more importance; and its provisions seemed to be still in force in 1863, and certainly had not expressly been repealed. This Act, the Inland Navigation Act 1537 (28 Hen 8 c 22) (Ir),1 vol of st p. 161, after reciting the great injury done to the navigation or traffic of boats, cottes, wherries, and other vessels on the royal rivers, Barrow, Nore, Suir, and those to and from Waterford, Kilkenny, Ross, Clonmel, and other places in the counties of Kildare, Catherlogh, (Carlow) Wexford, Kilkenny, Waterford, and Tipperary, by the erection of weirs and other obstacles, and through which the salmon fry were destroyed, enacted that it shall be lawful for any person, with the aid of the sheriff of the county, to prostrate all such weirs, and to make a convenient gap through every mill pond; it also imposed heavy penalties on persons resisting this summary process of removing obstructions to navigation. The Act, "so far as relates to destroying salmon fry," was repealed by the Fisheries (Ireland) Act 1842 (5 & 6 Vict c 106), the first Act of a code of Irish fishery laws; but there was not the least reason to doubt that it was in full force in all other respects in 1863. Indeed, as to the abatement of those public nuisances in the various navigable waters enumerated, it only confirmed and strengthened the common law, which permits everyone interested in the matter, and particularly required all justices and sheriffs, summarily, and of their own motion, without tedious formal process and authority from courts of law, to abate all nuisances prejudicial to the public interests, especially those so highly favoured as the interests of navigation, commerce, and fishing. Under this Act rights were enjoyed of towage on the banks of the rivers referred to in it; and there seems, therefore, no reason to doubt that the opinion attributed to Mr. M'Mahon MP, that this statute was still law and might at any time be enforced, was correct in 1863. Indeed, it was strengthened by the Inland Navigation Act 1731 (5 Geo 2 c 11) (Ir), which, after reciting the Inland Navigation Act 1537, imposed very heavy penalties-£50 for the first offence, £100 for the second, on the re-erection of any weirs prostrated under the authority of the Inland Navigation Act 1537, just recited. The Inland Navigation Act 1731, was only repealed, as to the third section, which relates to "fishermen or apprentices fishing in navigable waters." There was no provision in the Inland Navigation Act 1537, relating to the destruction of salmon fry. It only recited the fact of the destruction to salmon fry caused by the erection of weirs, etc.; and the repeal of the Act as to this recital seems a mere absurdity; the fact was true, and remained unaltered. The conclusion, therefore, seems clear that both statutes were in full force in 1863 as to the rivers and six counties named in them.

=== From and after the Fisheries (Ireland) Act 1842 ===
Ireland has a separate legislative history as to freshwater fisheries, beginning, as far as the practical purposes of 1883 were concerned, in the year 1842, when a consolidating Act was passed, and a great number of old Irish statutes as to salmon and other fisheries were repealed. This Act appears to have been to some extent the model for the English Salmon Fishery Act 1861. Its provisions were very full and elaborate. In 1848, commissioners and conservators were established and the system of licences introduced; the powers and proceedings of these officers were further defined in 1850. Fresh regulations were introduced (partly, in turn, adopted from the English Salmon Fishery Act 1861) by the Salmon Fishery (Ireland) Act 1863 (26 & 27 Vict c 114). In 1869, the duties of the former Special Commissioners were transferred to inspectors, who by 1883 had the power (among other things) of making by-laws, varying local close times, and issuing certificates and licences. They were styled the Inspectors of Irish Fisheries, were three in number, and were appointed by the Lord Lieutenant.

A feature about the administrative part of the Irish Acts was that the cruisers of the Royal Navy and the coast guard on the sea coast, and the constabulary inland, were specially authorised to enforce their provisions. Pollock thought this feature was remarkable.

=== History in the Republic of Ireland ===
The Fisheries Acts, 1842 to 1958 included the following two Acts, amongst others:

The Fisheries (Statute Law Revision) Act 1949 (No 27) was an Act of the Oireachtas. It effected pre-consolidation amendments (including repeals). It was repealed by section 5 of, and the First Schedule to, the Fisheries (Consolidation) Act 1959, subject to the saving in section 334 of that Act. Section 7 was applied by section 2(4) of the Fisheries (Amendment) Act 1953. Section 12 amended section 23 of the Shannon Fisheries Act 1935, and was repealed by section 25 of, and the Second Schedule to, the Fisheries (Statute Law Revision) Act 1956. As to section 21, see Attorney General (Mahoney) v Cooper. In section 29 (Protection of Waters from Pollution), the definitions of the expressions "deleterious matter" and "waters" were repealed by section 25 of, and the Second Schedule to, the Fisheries (Statute Law Revision) Act 1956. As to section 29(2), see State v Power. Section 30 amended section 38 of the Fisheries Act 1939, and was repealed by section 25 of, and the Second Schedule to, the Fisheries (Statute Law Revision) Act 1956. As to section 30, see Drugan v Airey.

The Fisheries (Statute Law Revision) Act 1956 (No 28) was an Act of the Oireachtas. It effected pre-consolidation amendments (including repeals). It was repealed by section 5 of, and the First Schedule to, the Fisheries (Consolidation) Act 1959, subject to the saving in section 334 of that Act.

Acts passed from 1959 onwards

The Fisheries (Amendment) Act 1974, the Fisheries (Amendment) Act 1978 and the Fisheries (Amendment) Act 1983 were repealed by Sea-Fisheries and Maritime Jurisdiction Act 2006. The Fisheries (Amendment) Act 2000 was repealed by the Inland Fisheries Act 2010.

=== History in Northern Ireland ===
The Fisheries (Amendment) (Northern Ireland) Order 1983 (SI 1983/1900) (NI 21) was revoked by the Public Authorities (Reform) Act (Northern Ireland) 2009.

== See also ==
- Fisheries Act
- Irish Conservation Box
