= Fishery Limits Act 1976 =

Act of the Parliament of the United Kingdom

Fishery Limits Act 1976 (Note: Section 12(1).)
- Act of Parliament
- Parliament of the United Kingdom
- Long title: An Act to extend British fishery limits and make further provision in connection with the regulation of sea fishing.
- Citation: 1976 c. 86
- Territorial extent: England and Wales; Scotland; Northern Ireland (Note: Section 10.); Isle of Man (Note: Section 11.); Channel Islands

Dates
- Royal assent: 22 December 1976
- Commencement: 1 January 1977 (Note: Section 12(2). The Fishery Limits Act 1976 (Commencement) Order 1976.)
Other legislation
Amends	Sea Fisheries (Shellfish) Act 1967; Salmon and Freshwater Fisheries Act 1975
Amended by	Inshore Fishing (Scotland) Act 1984; Statute Law (Repeals) Act 1993; Statute Law (Repeals) Act 1998; Salmon and Freshwater Fisheries (Consolidation) (Scotland) Act 2003

Status: Amended

Text of statute as originally enacted

Revised text of statute as amended

Text of the Fishery Limits Act 1976 as in force today (including any amendments) within the United Kingdom, from legislation.gov.uk.

The Fishery Limits Act 1976 (c. 86) is an act of the Parliament of the United Kingdom in order to implement the extension of fishing waters under the European Community's Common Fisheries Policy into British law.

The act extended the fishing limits from 12 nautical miles (22 km; 14 mi) to 200 nautical miles (370 km; 230 mi) and was in force with the members of the EEC and nine other countries. Iceland, with whom the United Kingdom had clashed over fishing rights in the so-called "Cod War", was not included due to separate negotiations with the EEC.

== See also ==
- Fisheries Act
