= Inshore Fishing (Scotland) Act 1984 =

Act of the Parliament of the United Kingdom

Inshore Fishing (Scotland) Act 1984 (Note: Section 11(1).)
- Act of Parliament
- Parliament of the United Kingdom
- Long title: An Act to make fresh provision for Scotland as regards the regulation of inshore sea fishing, and for connected purposes.
- Citation: 1984 c. 26
- Territorial extent: Scotland (Note: Section 11(4).)

Dates
- Royal assent: 26 June 1984
- Commencement: 26 July 1985 (Note: Section 11(2).)

Other legislation
- Amends: Crofters Holdings (Scotland) Act 1886; See § Repealed enactments
- Repeals/revokes: See § Repealed enactments
- Amended by: Inshore Fishing (Scotland) Act 1994; Environment Act 1995; Scotland Act 1998 (Consequential Modifications) (No.2) Order 1999
- Relates to: Sea Fisheries Act 1868; Sea Fish Industry Act 1970; Inshore Fishing (Scotland) Act 1984Debtors (Scotland) Act 1987; Scotland Act 1998 (River Tweed) Order 2006; Aquaculture and Fisheries (Scotland) Act 2013

Status: Amended

Text of statute as originally enacted

Revised text of statute as amended

Text of the Inshore Fishing (Scotland) Act 1984 as in force today (including any amendments) within the United Kingdom, from legislation.gov.uk.

The Inshore Fishing (Scotland) Act 1984 (1984 c. 26) is an act of the Parliament of the United Kingdom that made fresh provision for the regulation of inshore sea fishing in Scotland.

== Provisions ==
The act confers powers on the Secretary of State (now the Scottish Ministers) to regulate sea fishing within Scotland's inshore waters, defined as the area within six nautical miles of the baselines. Section 1 grants a general power to make orders prohibiting or restricting fishing for sea fish in designated areas, whether for all species or for specified descriptions of sea fish, by specified methods, or from specified descriptions of fishing vessel or other vehicle. Section 2 empowers the prohibition of the carriage of specified types of net. Section 3 restricts the use of mobile gear in the vicinity of fixed salmon nets.

Enforcement provisions are set out in sections 4 to 8. Section 4 creates offences for contravening restrictions made under the act. Sections 5 and 6 confer powers on sea-fishery officers, including powers of boarding, inspection, and the seizure of fish and equipment. Section 7 confers similar enforcement powers on water bailiffs. Section 8 deals with offences by bodies corporate and the recovery of fines.

=== Repealed enactments ===
Section 10 of the act repealed 29 enactments, listed in the second schedule to the act.

Citation	Short title	Extent of repeal
29 Geo. 2. c. 23	Fisheries (Scotland) Act 1756	The whole act.
48 Geo. 3. c. 110	Herring Fishery (Scotland) Act 1808	The whole act.
50 Geo. 3. c. 108	Sea Fisheries (Scotland) Act 1810	The whole act.
55 Geo. 3. c. 94	Herring Fishery (Scotland) Act 1815	The whole act.
1 & 2 Geo. 4. c. 79	White Herring Fishery (Scotland) Act 1821	The whole act.
14 & 15 Vict. c. 26	Herring Fishery Act 1851	The whole act.
23 & 24 Vict. c. 92	Herring Fisheries (Scotland) Act 1860	The whole act.
24 & 25 Vict. c. 72	White Herring Fishery (Scotland) Act 1861	The whole act.
30 & 31 Vict. c. 52	Herring Fisheries (Scotland) Act 1867	The whole act.
44 & 45 Vict. c. 11	Sea Fisheries (Clam and Bait Beds) Act 1881	The whole act.
45 & 46 Vict. c. 78	Fishery Board (Scotland) Act 1882	In section 2, the definition of "Herring Fishery Acts". Section 5(1). Schedule 1.
48 & 49 Vict. c. 70	Sea Fisheries (Scotland) Amendment Act 1885	Sections 4 and 11.
49 & 50 Vict. c. 29	Crofters' Holdings (Scotland) Act 1886	In section 32, the words from "and the Secretary of the Board" to "name of the Board".
52 & 53 Vict. c. 23	Herring Fishery (Scotland) Act 1889	The whole act.
58 & 59 Vict. c. 42	Sea Fisheries Regulation (Scotland) Act 1895	The whole act.
7 Edw. 7. c. 42	Sea Fisheries (Scotland) Application of Penalties Act 1907	The whole act.
9 Edw. 7. c. 8	Trawling in Prohibited Areas Prevention Act 1909	The whole act.
24 & 25 Geo. 5. c. 18	Illegal Trawling (Scotland) Act 1934	Section 1. Section 5. In section 6, the definition of "Herring Fishery (Scotland) Acts", and in the definition of "illegal trawling" the words from "and the expression" to the end of the definition.
10 & 11 Geo. 6. c. 43	Local Government (Scotland) Act 1947	Section 377(4).
14 & 15 Geo. 6. c. 39	Common Informers Act 1951	In the Schedule, the entry relating to the Fisheries (Scotland) Act 1756.
7 & 8 Eliz. 2. c. 27	Sea Fisheries (Compensation) (Scotland) Act 1959	The whole act.
8 & 9 Eliz. 2. c. 34	Radioactive Substances Act 1960	In Part II of the First Schedule, para. 12.
1964 c. 72	Fishery Limits Act 1964	In Schedule 1, the amendments of the Herring Fisheries (Scotland) Act 1860, the Herring Fisheries (Scotland) Act 1867 and the Sea Fisheries (Clam and Bait Beds) Act 1881.
1965 c. 13	Rivers (Prevention of Pollution) (Scotland) Act 1965	Section 2(2)(d).
1967 c. 83	Sea Fisheries (Shellfish) Act 1967	In Schedule 2, the amendments to the Sea Fisheries (Clam and Bait Beds) Act 1881 and the Sea Fisheries Regulation (Scotland) Act 1895.
1968 c. 77	Sea Fisheries Act 1968	In Part II of Schedule 1, paragraphs 25 and 35.
1970 c. 36	Merchant Shipping Act 1970	In Schedule 3, paragraph 8.
1976 c. 86	Fishery Limits Act 1976	In section 2(8)(a), the figure "4". In Schedule 2, paragraphs 1, 2, 4 and 6.
1981 c. 29	Fisheries Act 1981	In Part I of Schedule 4, paragraphs 7 to 9. In Part II of Schedule 4, paragraph 29.

== Subsequent developments ==
The act has been amended on several occasions. The Inshore Fishing (Scotland) Act 1994 extended the powers under the act to cover vehicles and equipment used in connection with fishing, and added provisions relating to marine environmental purposes. Following Scottish devolution, the functions of the Secretary of State under the act were transferred to the Scottish Ministers by the Scotland Act 1998 with effect from 1 July 1999.
