= Fisheries Act 1985 =

Parliament of Malaysia
- Long title: An Act relating to fisheries, including the conservation, management and development of maritime and estuarine fishing and fisheries, in Malaysian fisheries waters, to turtles and riverine fishing in Malaysia and to matters connected therewith or incidental thereto.
- Citation: Act 317
- Territorial extent: Malaysia
- Passed by: Dewan Rakyat
- Passed: 10 April 1985
- Passed by: Dewan Negara
- Passed: 19 April 1985
- Royal assent: 22 May 1985
- Commenced: 30 May 1985
- Effective: Except for Part IX in its application to the State of Sabah—1 January 1986, P.U. (B) 627/1985

Legislative history

First chamber: Dewan Rakyat
- Bill title: Fisheries Bill 1984
- Bill citation: D.R. 46/1984
- Introduced by: Anwar Ibrahim, Minister of Agriculture
- First reading: 3 December 1984
- Second reading: 8 April 1985
- Third reading: 10 April 1985

Second chamber: Dewan Negara
- Bill title: Fisheries Bill 1984
- Bill citation: D.R. 46/1984
- Member(s) in charge: Goh Cheng Teik, Deputy Minister of Agriculture
- First reading: 15 April 1985
- Second reading: 19 April 1985
- Third reading: 19 April 1985

Amended by
- Fisheries (Amendment) Act 1993 [Act A854] Fisheries (Amendment) Act 2012 [Act A1413]

Related legislation
- United Nations Convention on the Law of the Sea; Fisheries Act 1963 [Act 210]

Keywords
- Fisheries, fishing vessel, aquaculture, marine park, marine reserve
- Status: In force

The Fisheries Act 1985 (Malay: Akta Perikanan 1985) is a Malaysian federal act relating to the administration and management of fisheries, including the conservation and development of maritime and estuarine fishing and fisheries in Malaysia waters, protection to aquatic mammals and turtles and riverine fishing in Malaysia and to matters connected to establishment of marine parks and marine reserves.

The Director-General of Fisheries is the management authority and has absolute powers in making conditions for permits related to fishery resources.

Even though the Director-General has official authority, much of the local fishing industry are under the control of aquaculture gangs, and the act itself has sparked gang violence in many areas regarding the gang's control of fishing "turf".

== Preamble ==
- WHEREAS it is expedient to consolidate and amend the written law relating to fisheries, including the conservation, management and development of maritime and estuarine fishing and fisheries, in Malaysian fisheries waters and to turtles and riverine fishing in Malaysia;
- AND WHEREAS by Clause (1) of Article 74 of the Federal Constitution Parliament may make laws with respect to any of the matters enumerated in the Federal List or the Concurrent List, and whereas fisheries, including maritime and estuarine fishing and fisheries (excluding turtles), is a matter enumerated in the Federal List under item 9 of List I of the Ninth Schedule to the Federal Constitution and maritime and estuarine fishing and fisheries are also matters enumerated in the Concurrent List under item 12 of List IIIA of the said Ninth Schedule in respect of the States of Sabah and Sarawak;
- AND WHEREAS by Clause (1)(b) of Article 76 of the Federal Constitution Parliament may make laws with respect to any matter enumerated in the State List for the purpose of promoting uniformity of the laws of two or more States, and whereas turtles and riverine fishing are matters enumerated in the State List under item 12 of List II of the Ninth Schedule of the Federal Constitution

== Structure ==
The Fisheries Act 1985, in its current form (1 November 2012), consists of 11 Parts containing 62 sections and no schedule (including 2 amendments).

- Part I: Preliminary
- Part II: Administration
- Part III: Fisheries Plans
- Part IV: General Licensing Provisions
- Part V: Foreign Fishing Vessels
- Part VI: Offences
- Part VII: Turtles and Inland Fisheries
- Part VIII: Aquaculture
- Part IX: Marine Parks and Marine Reserves
- Part X: Enforcement
- Part XI: General Provisions

== See also ==
- Fisheries Act
