= Seafish (non-departmental public body) =

Public body in the UK

- Formation: 1981
- Legal status: Non-departmental public body
- Purpose: Managing the sea fish industry of the UK
- Location(s): 18 Logie Mill, Logie Green Road, Edinburgh and Origin Way, Europarc, Grimsby
- Region served: UK
- Members: Fish restaurants and suppliers
- Chief Executive: Colin Faulkner
- Main organ: Seafish Board
- Website: Seafish

Seafish, formerly the Sea Fish Industry Authority, is a non-departmental public body in the United Kingdom sponsored by the Department for Environment, Food and Rural Affairs. Established in 1981, and charged with working with the UK seafood industry to promote good quality, sustainable seafood. Seafish revised its mission in 2018.

== History ==
Seafish was established in the United Kingdom under the Fisheries Act 1981 through the amalgamation of the Herring Industry Board (founded in 1934) and the White Fish Authority (founded in 1951).

Seafish has its administrative base in the Scottish city of Edinburgh and has its research and development base in Grimsby, the UK's main base for the fishing industry and frozen food. The organisation in Grimsby moved into the new Humber Seafood Institute, run by the Grimsby Institute, in July 2008. It was formerly based on St Andrews Dock in Hull.

Seafish carries out research and projects aimed at raising standards, improving efficiency and ensuring the sustainable development of the industry. As well as supplying training and R&D, Seafish operates accreditation schemes for fish and chip shops, fishermen, wholesalers and processors. Seafish has an economics team which collects, interprets and disseminates data about various UK seafood sectors.

== Funding ==
Seafish is sponsored by the fisheries departments of the four UK governments and is funded by a levy across all sectors of the fisheries and seafood industry. This levy is due on all first-hand purchases of sea fish, shellfish, and sea fish products including fish meal landed in the United Kingdom. This includes imports, which make up more than 75% of UK seafood consumption, as well as the domestic catch landed in the UK, the majority of which is exported.

== Seafish services ==
=== Economics ===
Seafish is a source of economic information for industry and policy makers on the fishing, supply and processing industries conducting surveys and analyses of the UK fleet and processing sectors, including trends in costs and earnings and economics impact multipliers. The Economics department also produces strategic analyses such as the 'Seafood Strategic Outlook' and fleet futures modelling.

=== Research and development ===
Seafish carried out research and projects to improve efficiency and seafood quality and obtain best value for money for the UK seafood industry. The 16-strong team is based around the UK.

A number of research and development projects are funded through the Seafish Industry Project Fund. During 2006 and 2007, over £2.5 million has been invested in 47 projects which have funded research and development partnership projects, grant assistance for innovative ideas and bursaries for students.

=== Seafood Information Network (SIN) ===
Seafish has created SIN, an information portal for the global seafood industry. SIN is an internet-based data source for business, researchers and service providers.

=== Seafish Responsible Fishing Scheme ===
The Seafish Responsible Fishing Scheme is a BSi Publicly Available Specification (PAS 72:2006) awarded to individual vessels for vessel operations and traceability in the sea fishing industry. It specifies requirements relating to fishing practices, vessel criteria, crew competence, environmental considerations and record maintenance. It is applicable to the supply chain from the fisherman to the point of first sale. In late 2009 around 500 vessels are involved in the scheme with 325 vessels fully certified covering about 70% of UK landings by weight. The scheme is independently audited by UKAS approved auditors.
