= Sea Fisheries (Shellfish) Act 1967 =

Act of the Parliament of the United Kingdom

Sea Fisheries (Shellfish) Act 1967 (Note: Section 25(1).)
- Act of Parliament
- Parliament of the United Kingdom
- Long title: An Act to consolidate certain enactments relating to shellfish fisheries and shellfish, with amendments to give effect to recommendations of the Law Commission and the Scottish Law Commission.
- Citation: 1967 c. 83
- Territorial extent: England and Wales; Scotland; (Note: Section 25(2).)

Dates
- Royal assent: 27 October 1967
- Commencement: 27 November 1967

Other legislation
- Amends: See § Repealed enactments
- Repeals/revokes: See § Repealed enactments
- Amended by: Hovercraft Act 1968; Sea Fisheries Act 1968; Criminal Justice Act 1972; Hovercraft (Application of Enactments) Order 1972; Sea Fisheries (Shellfish) Act 1973; Criminal Procedure (Scotland) Act 1975; Fishery Limits Act 1976; Fisheries Act 1981; Diseases of Fish Act 1983; Inshore Fishing (Scotland) Act 1984; Channel Tunnel (Amendment of Agriculture, Fisheries and Food Import Legislation) Order 1990; Local Government (Wales) Act 1994; Sale of Goods (Amendment) Act 1994; Criminal Justice and Public Order Act 1994; Sea Fisheries (Shellfish) (Amendment) Act 1997; Scotland Act 1998 (Consequential Modifications) (No.2) Order 1999; Sea Fisheries (Shellfish) Amendment (Scotland) Act 2000; Police, Public Order and Criminal Justice (Scotland) Act 2006; Aquaculture and Fisheries (Scotland) Act 2007; Marine and Coastal Access Act 2009; Marine (Scotland) Act 2010; Aquaculture and Fisheries (Scotland) Act 2013; Legal Aid, Sentencing and Punishment of Offenders Act 2012 (Fines on Summary Conviction) Regulations 2015; Environment (Wales) Act 2016; Criminal Justice (Scotland) Act 2016 (Consequential and Supplementary Modifications) Regulations 2017; Conservation of Habitats and Species Regulations 2017; Crown Estate Transfer Scheme 2017
- Relates to: Sea Fisheries (Clam and Bait Beds) Act 1881; Sea Fisheries Regulation Act 1966; Sea Fish (Conservation) Act 1967

Status: Amended

Text of statute as originally enacted

Revised text of statute as amended

Text of the Sea Fisheries (Shellfish) Act 1967 as in force today (including any amendments) within the United Kingdom, from legislation.gov.uk.

The Sea Fisheries (Shellfish) Act 1967 (c. 83) is an act of the Parliament of the United Kingdom that consolidated certain enactments relating to shellfish fisheries and shellfish in Great Britain, with amendments to give effect to recommendations of the Law Commission and the Scottish Law Commission.

== Provisions ==
=== Repealed enactments ===
Section 24(2) of the act repealed 11 enactments, listed in schedule 3 to the act.

Enactments repealed by section 24(2)
Citation	Short title	Extent of repeal
31 & 32 Vict. c. 45	Sea Fisheries Act 1868	Part III. Sections 58 and 68.
32 & 33 Vict. c. 31	Oyster and Mussel Fisheries Orders Confirmation Act 1869 (No. 2)	Sections 2 and 3.
38 & 39 Vict. c. 15	Sea Fisheries Act 1875	The whole act.
40 & 41 Vict. c. 42	Fisheries (Oyster, Crab and Lobster) Act 1877	The whole act.
47 & 48 Vict. c. 27	Sea Fisheries Act 1884	The whole act.
48 & 49 Vict. c. 70	Sea Fisheries (Scotland) Amendment Act 1885	In section 3, the words "the Sea Fisheries Act, 1875, and". In section 11, paragraphs (a) and (b).
58 & 59 Vict. c. 42	Sea Fisheries Regulation (Scotland) Act 1895	Sections 11 to 17.
3 Edw. 7. c. 31	Board of Agriculture and Fisheries Act 1903	In the Schedule, Part 4.
23 & 24 Geo. 5. c. 45	Sea-Fishing Industry Act 1933	In section 4 (as substituted by section 38 of the Sea Fish Industry Act 1938), subsection (2).
1 & 2 Geo. 6. c. 30	Sea Fish Industry Act 1938	Section 58. In section 59, the words from the beginning to "1868". Section 61(2).
10 & 11 Eliz. 2. c. 31	Sea Fish Industry Act 1962	Sections 19 to 26. In section 32(1)(a), the words from "section nineteen" to "twenty-six" and section 32(2)(a), except in so far as it relates to receipts in pursuance of an order made in accordance with section 11(5) of that Act. In section 33(1), the definitions of "land", "mussel", "oyster" and "shellfish bed". In section 34(2), the words from "and", where first occurring, to "twenty", and section 34(3) so far as it relates to orders under Part III of the Sea Fisheries Act 1868. In section 35(5), the words "nineteen to". In Schedule 2, paragraphs 1 to 4.
