= Fisheries Act 1981 =

Act of the Parliament of the United Kingdom

Fisheries Act 1981 (Note: Section 46(1).)
- Act of Parliament
- Parliament of the United Kingdom
- Long title: An Act to establish a Sea Fish Industry Authority with the duty of promoting the efficiency of the sea fish industry in the United Kingdom; to provide financial assistance for that industry; to amend the law relating to the regulation of sea fishing; to make new provision in relation to fish farming; to amend the enactments relating to whales and the importation of live fish; to extend sections 6 and 7 of the Freshwater and Salmon Fisheries (Scotland) Act 1976 to the part of the River Tweed outside Scotland; to repeal section 5(3) of the Fishery Board (Scotland) Act 1882; and to enable the Department of Agriculture for Northern Ireland to incur expenditure on fishery protection in waters adjacent to Northern Ireland.
- Citation: 1981 c. 29
- Territorial extent: England and Wales; Scotland; Northern Ireland (in part); (Note: Section 46(6).)

Dates
- Royal assent: 2 July 1981
- Commencement: various (Note: Section 46(2)–(4).)
Other legislation
Amends	Sea Fisheries (Shellfish) Act 1967; Import of Live Fish (England and Wales) Act 1980
Repeals/revokes	Whale Fisheries (Scotland) Act 1907; Whale Fisheries (Scotland) Amendment Act 1922; Sea Fish Industry Act 1973; Sea Fish Industry Act 1980
Amended by	Inshore Fishing (Scotland) Act 1984; Statute Law (Repeals) Act 1986; Channel Tunnel (Amendment of the Fisheries Act 1981) Order 1994; Scotland Act 1998 (Cross-Border Public Authorities) (Adaptation of Functions etc.) Order 1999; Scotland Act 1998 (Consequential Modifications) (No.2) Order 1999; International Development Act 2002; Salmon and Freshwater Fisheries (Consolidation) (Scotland) Act 2003; Criminal Justice Act 2003; Government Resources and Accounts Act 2000 (Audit of Public Bodies) Order 2003; Statute Law (Repeals) Act 2004; Government Resources and Accounts Act 2000 (Audit of Public Bodies) Order 2004; Scotland Act 1998 (River Tweed) Order 2006; Aquaculture and Fisheries (Scotland) Act 2007; Marine and Coastal Access Act 2009; Marine (Scotland) Act 2010; Marine and Coastal Access Act 2009 (Consequential Provisions) (Wales) Order 2010; Treaty of Lisbon (Changes in Terminology) Order 2011; Tribunals, Courts and Enforcement Act 2007 (Consequential Amendments) Order 2012; Aquaculture and Fisheries (Scotland) Act 2013; Legal Aid, Sentencing and Punishment of Offenders Act 2012 (Fines on Summary Conviction) Regulations 2015; Fisheries Act (Northern Ireland) 2016; Fisheries (Amendment) (EU Exit) Regulations 2019; Fisheries Act 2020; Common Fisheries Policy (Amendment etc.) (EU Exit) (No. 2) Regulations 2020; Retained EU Law (Revocation and Reform) Act 2023 (Consequential Amendment) Regulations 2023

Status: Amended

Text of statute as originally enacted

Revised text of statute as amended

Text of the Fisheries Act 1981 as in force today (including any amendments) within the United Kingdom, from legislation.gov.uk.

2

The Fisheries Act 1981 (c. 29) is an act of the Parliament of the United Kingdom.

With regards to the sea fishing industry, the act established the Sea Fish Industry Authority, which was given the duty to promote the efficiency of the industry in the UK, and provided for financial assistance to the industry.

The act also made new provisions with regard to fish farming, and enabled the Department of Agriculture for Northern Ireland to spend money on fisheries protection in Northern Irish waters.

== See also ==
- Fisheries Act
